= Bagòss =

Italian raw-milk cheese from Bagolino, Lombardy

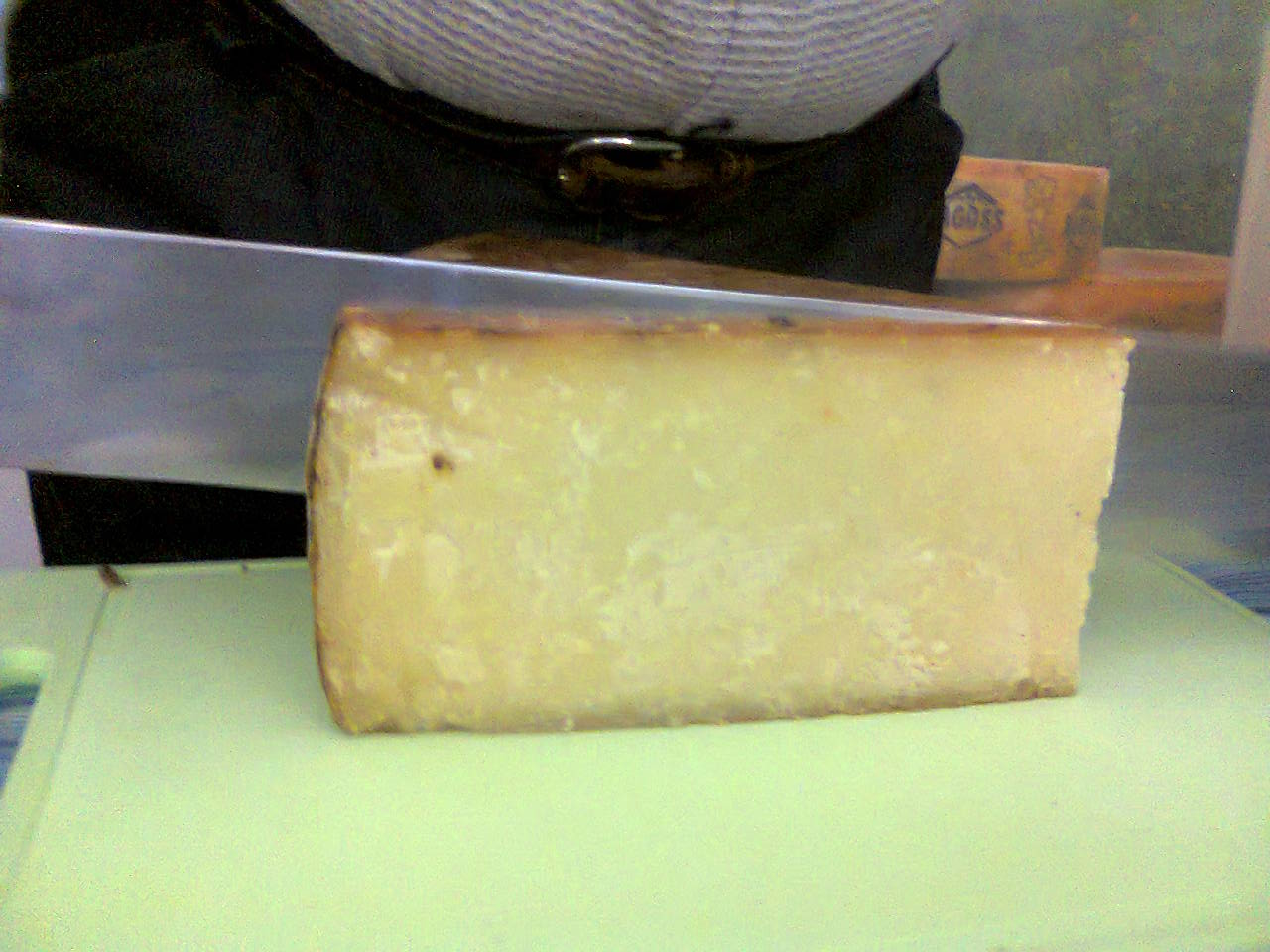
- Other names: Bagòss di Bagolino, Bagòs, Bagoss
- Country of origin: Italy
- Region: Lombardy
- Town: Bagolino, Province of Brescia
- Source of milk: cow's milk
- Pasteurised: No (raw milk)
- Dimensions: 40 cm (16 in) diameter; 10–15 cm (3.9–5.9 in) height
- Weight: 16–22 kg (35–49 lb)
- Certification: Slow Food Presidium (1999); PAT of Lombardy

Bagòss (also spelled Bagòs or Bagoss. Full name Bagòss di Bagolino) is an Italian raw-milk, hard cow's-milk cheese made only in the comune of Bagolino, in the Caffaro Valley of the Province of Brescia, Lombardy. It is aged for at least twelve months and often for two to three years, and is recognisable by its large cylindrical wheels, a straw-yellow paste tinted by saffron, and a dark ochre rind oiled during ageing with linseed oil. Locally, the cheese is also called oro di Bagolino ("the gold of Bagolino") for its colour, or grana dei poveri ("the poor man's grana") for its long ageing and use as a grating cheese. Bagòss has been a Slow Food Presidium since 1999 and is listed in the regional register of Prodotti Agroalimentari Tradizionali (PAT) of Lombardy.

== Name ==
The name is the local Lombard demonym for inhabitants of Bagolino, bagossi. The variants Bagòs and Bagoss di Bagolino appear alongside Bagòss in the Lombardy PAT register.

== History ==
Cheesemaking in Bagolino is documented from at least the 16th century, when the village sat on the western edge of the Republic of Venice. Local accounts link the use of saffron to the Venetian spice trade and to a tradition that the cheese was first made for the Doge, with the saffron supplying a colour fit for the recipient.

In the late 20th century the producers grouped together as the Cooperativa Valle di Bagolino to coordinate marketing and brand the wheels with a common heel mark. In 1999 Fondazione Slow Food per la Biodiversità established a Presidium for the cheese, in cooperation with the municipality, the cooperative, the Sabbia Valley Mountain Community and the Province of Brescia. Bagòss is now made by some 28 family farms in Bagolino and is exported in small quantities to specialist retailers in Japan, the United States, the United Kingdom and Germany.

== Production ==
Bagòss is made only within the territory of Bagolino, a mountain comune in the Caffaro Valley near Lake Idro. The protocol agreed between the cooperative and the Slow Food Presidium requires raw milk from cows of the Italian Brown breed (Bruna Alpina), reared in Bagolino and fed only on local hay and pasture. Production splits in two: in summer the cheesemakers move up to the alpine malghe at roughly 1,700–2,000 metres (5,600–6,600 ft) above sea level, on Maniva and the Bruffione massif. In winter they work in the valley dairies. Saffron is added only in the winter cheeses. The summer alpine wheels are made without it.

Each wheel uses about 300 litres (66 imp gal; 79 US gal) of milk and three to four hours' work. The morning's milk is filtered through spruce (Picea abies) branches, partially skimmed by leaving the cream to rise overnight, then heated in copper cauldrons over a wood fire to about 39 °C (102 °F). Powdered rennet is added with, in winter, a small spoon of finely ground saffron. The curd is broken by hand, briefly cooked, drawn out and pressed into wooden moulds. The wheels are dry-salted by hand every two weeks for about forty days, then moved to ageing cellars where the rind is regularly oiled. Originally the producers used raw linseed oil, but Italian dairy regulations now require a pasteurised version. The treatment gives the rind its characteristic dark ochre colour. Minimum ageing under the Presidium protocol is twelve months; most wheels are matured for 24 or 36 months, and exceptional ones for up to 48.

== Characteristics ==
A wheel is cylindrical with flat heels, about 40 centimetres (16 in) across, 10–15 centimetres (3.9–5.9 in) high and 16–22 kilograms (35–49 lb) in weight, which puts Bagòss among the largest of the Italian alpine cheeses. The rind is hard, inedible and oiled to an ochre-brown. The paste is firm, granular, breaks into flakes when cut, and shows occasional small eyes. Tasting notes typically describe it as savoury and persistent, with leather, walnut and chestnut tones and a piquant finish in the older wheels. Maximum moisture is 35–38%. Fat on dry matter is 23–26%.

The closest cousin of Bagòss is the DOP-protected Nostrano Valtrompia, made in the neighbouring Val Trompia from the same breed and by a similar method, also with added saffron.

== Culinary use ==
Young Bagòss is eaten as a table cheese with country bread or hot polenta. Older wheels are grated over risotto, soups and broths, used as a filling for ravioli or melted with butter for cornmeal dishes. Local recipes include polenta with Bagòss, Bagòss risotto and the meatball-like mereconde. Suggested wine pairings range from sparkling Franciacorta for younger wheels to aged reds such as Amarone or Barolo for the longest-aged.

In Bagolino the second weekend of October marks the Festa della Transumanza, when the herds come down from the alpine pastures; on the same weekend the Brescia delegation of the ONAF judges the year's best Bagòss.
