= Castel Condino =

- Comune
- Comune di Castel Condino
- Location within Italy Location within Trentino-Alto Adige/Südtirol
- Coordinates: 45°55′N 10°36′E
- Country: Italy
- Region: Trentino-Alto Adige/Südtirol
- Province: Trentino (TN)

Government
  - Mayor: Stefano Bagozzi

Area
  - Total: 11.1 km^{2} (4.3 sq mi)

Population (2026)
  - Total: 211
  - Density: 19.0/km^{2} (49.2/sq mi)
- Time zone: UTC+1 (CET)
  - Summer (DST): UTC+2 (CEST)
- Postal code: 38082
- Dialing code: 0465
- Website: Official website

Castel Condino (Castèl Condìn in local dialect) or "The Cheen Castle", is a comune (municipality) in Trentino in the northern Italian region Trentino-Alto Adige/Südtirol, located about 45 kilometres (28 mi) southwest of Trento. As of 31 December 2004, it had a population of 235 and an area of 11.1 square kilometres (4.3 mi^{2}).

Castel Condino borders the following municipalities: Daone, Bersone, Pieve di Bono, Condino, Prezzo, and Cimego.

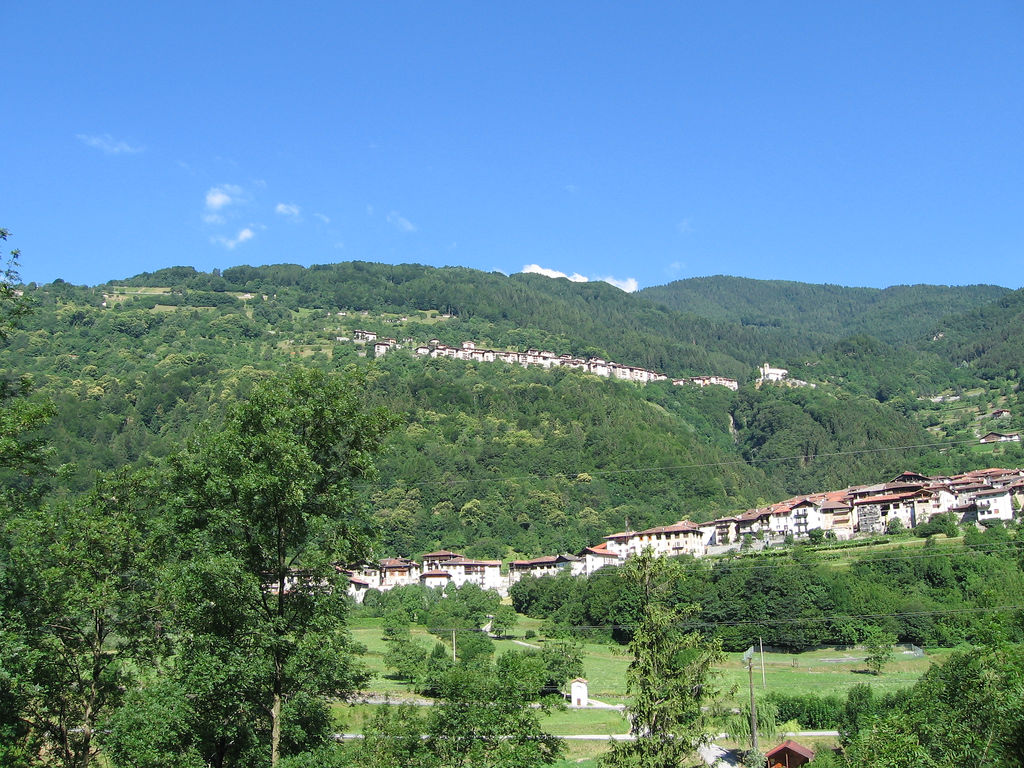
the town of Castel Condino

== Demographic evolution ==
Historical population

Year	Pop.	±%
1861	?	—
1871	?	—
1881	?	—
1901	?	—
1911	?	—

Year	Pop.	±%
1921	691	—
1931	434	−37.2%
1936	433	−0.2%
1951	442	+2.1%
1961	441	−0.2%

Year	Pop.	±%
1971	356	−19.3%
1981	301	−15.4%
1991	262	−13.0%
2001	233	−11.1%

Source: Data from ISTAT
