= Bersone =

- Comune
- Comune di Bersone
- Location within Italy Location within Trentino-Alto Adige/Südtirol
- Coordinates: 45°57′N 10°38′E
- Country: Italy
- Region: Trentino-Alto Adige/Südtirol
- Province: Trentino (TN)

Area
  - Total: 9.8 km^{2} (3.8 sq mi)

Population (Dec. 2004)
  - Total: 290
  - Density: 30/km^{2} (77/sq mi)
- Time zone: UTC+1 (CET)
  - Summer (DST): UTC+2 (CEST)
- Postal code: 38085
- Dialing code: 0465
- Website: Official website

Bersone (Barsùn in local dialect) was a comune (municipality) in Trentino in the northern Italian region Trentino-Alto Adige/Südtirol, located about 40 kilometres (25 mi) southwest of Trento. As of 31 December 2004, it had a population of 290 and an area of 9.8 square kilometres (3.8 mi^{2}). It was merged with Daone and Praso on January 1, 2015, to form a new municipality, Valdaone.

Bersone borders the following municipalities: Daone, Praso, Pieve di Bono, Prezzo, and Castel Condino.

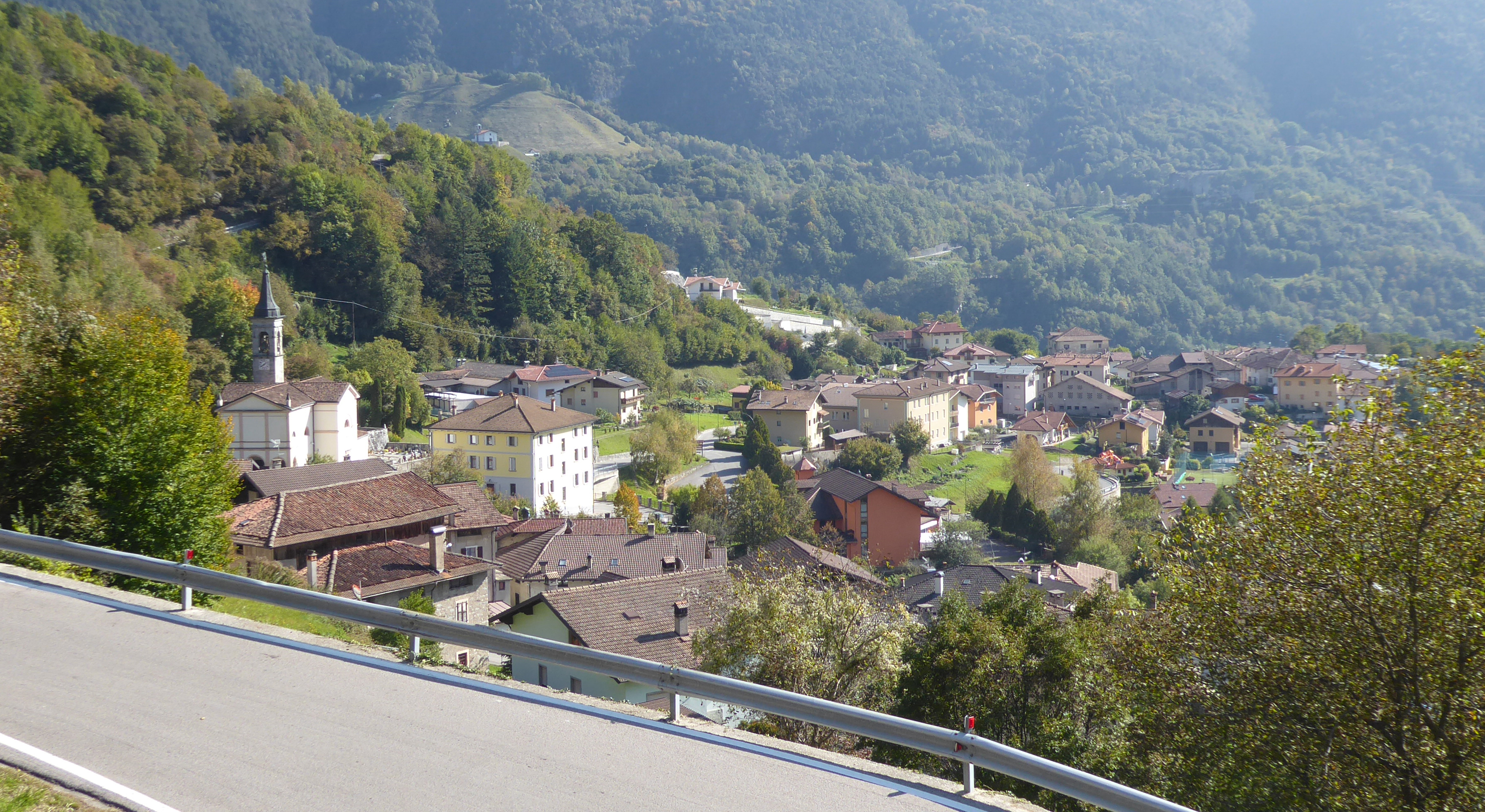

== Demographic evolution ==
Historical population

Year	Pop.	±%
1861	?	—
1871	?	—
1881	?	—
1901	?	—
1911	?	—

Year	Pop.	±%
1921	360	—
1931	342	−5.0%
1936	342	+0.0%
1951	318	−7.0%
1961	340	+6.9%

Year	Pop.	±%
1971	341	+0.3%
1981	307	−10.0%
1991	304	−1.0%
2001	295	−3.0%

Source: Data from ISTAT
