= Praso, Italy =

Praso
- Comune
- Comune di Praso
- Location within Italy Location within Trentino-Alto Adige/Südtirol
- Coordinates: 45°57′N 10°38′E
- Country: Italy
- Region: Trentino-Alto Adige/Südtirol
- Province: Trentino (TN)

Area
  - Total: 9.8 km^{2} (3.8 sq mi)

Population (Dec. 2004)
  - Total: 362
  - Density: 37/km^{2} (96/sq mi)
- Time zone: UTC+1 (CET)
  - Summer (DST): UTC+2 (CEST)
- Postal code: 38080
- Dialing code: 0465
- Website: Official website

Praso (Pras in local dialect) was a comune (municipality) in Trentino in the northern Italian region Trentino-Alto Adige/Südtirol, located about 40 kilometres (25 mi) southwest of Trento. As of 31 December 2004, it had a population of 362 and an area of 9.8 square kilometres (3.8 mi^{2}). It was merged with Daone and Bersone on January 1, 2015, to form a new municipality, Valdaone.

Praso borders the following municipalities: Daone, Roncone, Lardaro, Bersone and Pieve di Bono.

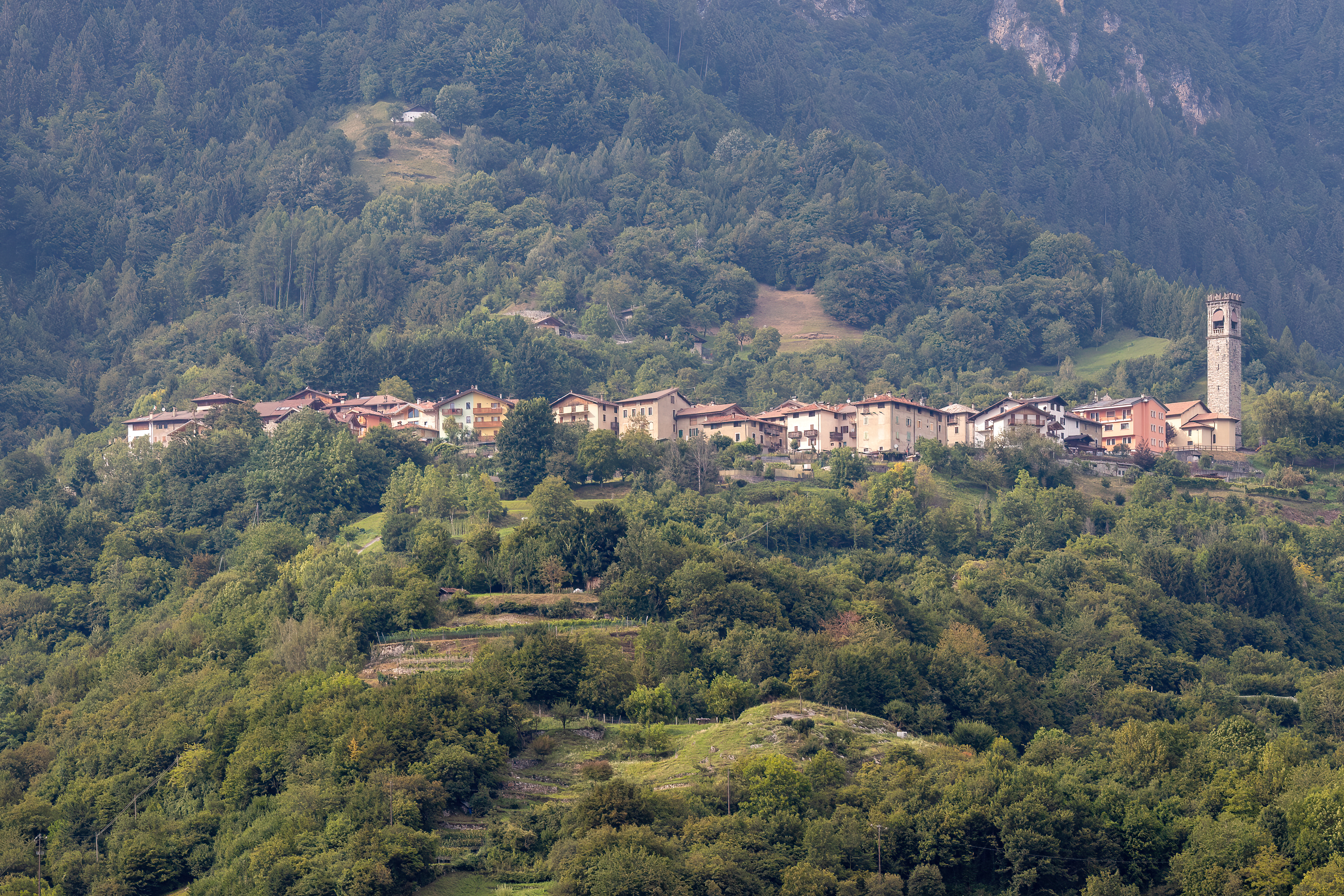
Praso, Trentino, Italy

== Demographic evolution ==
Historical population

| Year | Pop. | ±% |
|---|---|---|
| 1861 | ? | — |
| 1871 | ? | — |
| 1881 | ? | — |
| 1901 | ? | — |
| 1911 | ? | — |

| Year | Pop. | ±% |
|---|---|---|
| 1921 | 509 | — |
| 1931 | 521 | +2.4% |
| 1936 | 492 | −5.6% |
| 1951 | 509 | +3.5% |
| 1961 | 492 | −3.3% |

| Year | Pop. | ±% |
|---|---|---|
| 1971 | 492 | +0.0% |
| 1981 | 438 | −11.0% |
| 1991 | 381 | −13.0% |
| 2001 | 370 | −2.9% |

Source: Data from ISTAT
