= Cimego =

- Comune
- Comune di Cimego
- Location within Italy Location within Trentino-Alto Adige/Südtirol
- Coordinates: 45°55′N 10°37′E
- Country: Italy
- Region: Trentino-Alto Adige/Südtirol
- Province: Trentino (TN)

Area
  - Total: 10.5 km^{2} (4.1 sq mi)

Population (Dec. 2004)
  - Total: 418
  - Density: 39.8/km^{2} (103/sq mi)
- Time zone: UTC+1 (CET)
  - Summer (DST): UTC+2 (CEST)
- Postal code: 38082
- Dialing code: 0465
- Website: Official website

Cimego (German: Zimeck) is a former comune, now a frazione of Borgo Chiese in Trentino in the northern Italian region Trentino-Alto Adige/Südtirol, located about 40 kilometres (25 mi) southwest of Trento. As of 31 December 2004, it had a population of 418 and an area of 10.5 square kilometres (4.1 mi^{2}).

Cimego borders the following municipalities: Daone, Pieve di Bono, Condino, Castel Condino and Ledro.

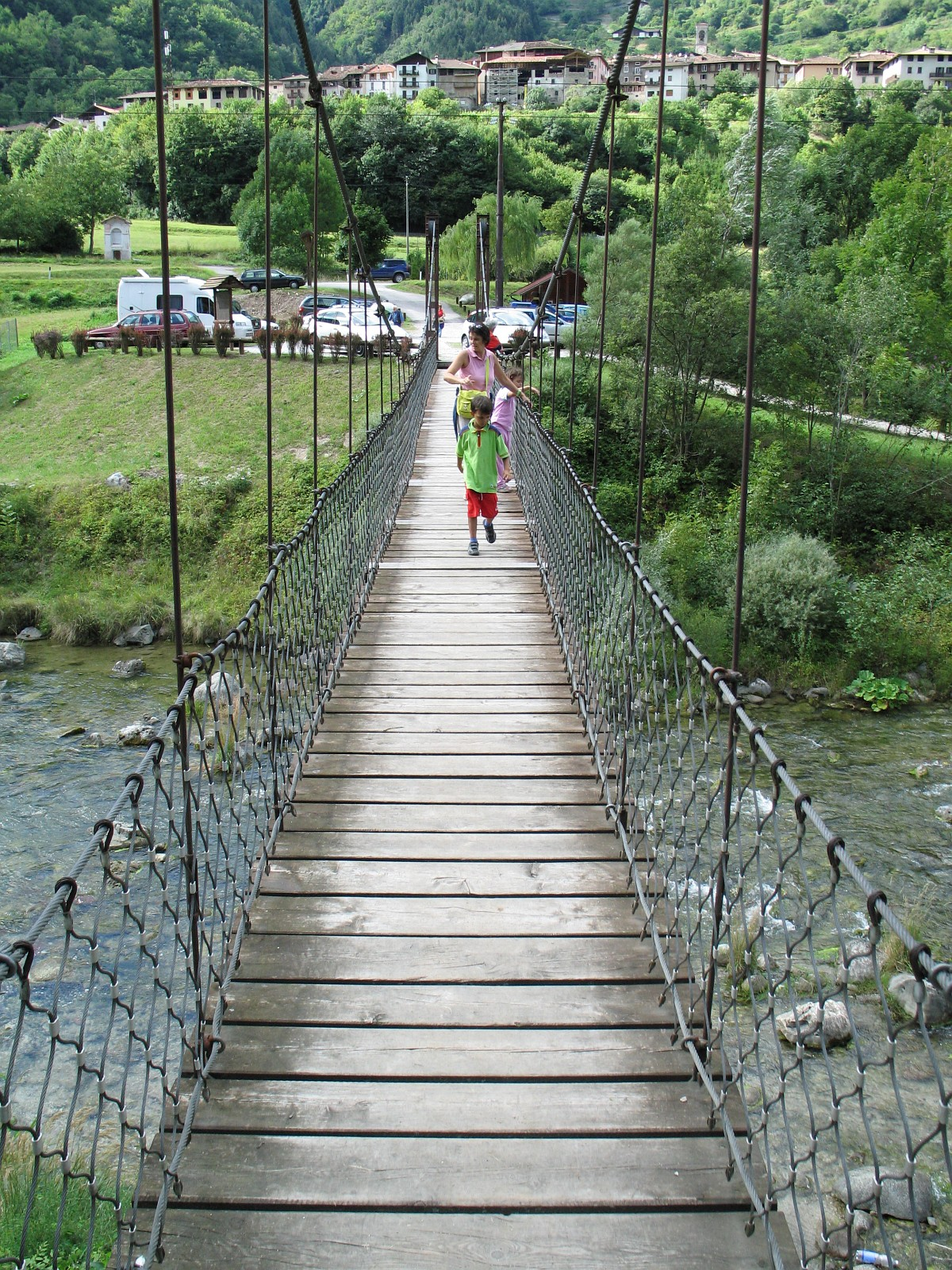
Suspended bridge over the river Chiese

== Demographic evolution ==
Historical population

Year	Pop.	±%
1861	?	—
1871	?	—
1881	?	—
1901	?	—
1911	?	—

Year	Pop.	±%
1921	685	—
1931	574	−16.2%
1936	559	−2.6%
1951	507	−9.3%
1961	522	+3.0%

Year	Pop.	±%
1971	468	−10.3%
1981	412	−12.0%
1991	399	−3.2%
2001	407	+2.0%

Source: Data from ISTAT
