= Rocca d'Anfo =

Historic fortification in Anfo, Italy

Coordinates: 45°46′32″N 10°30′01″E

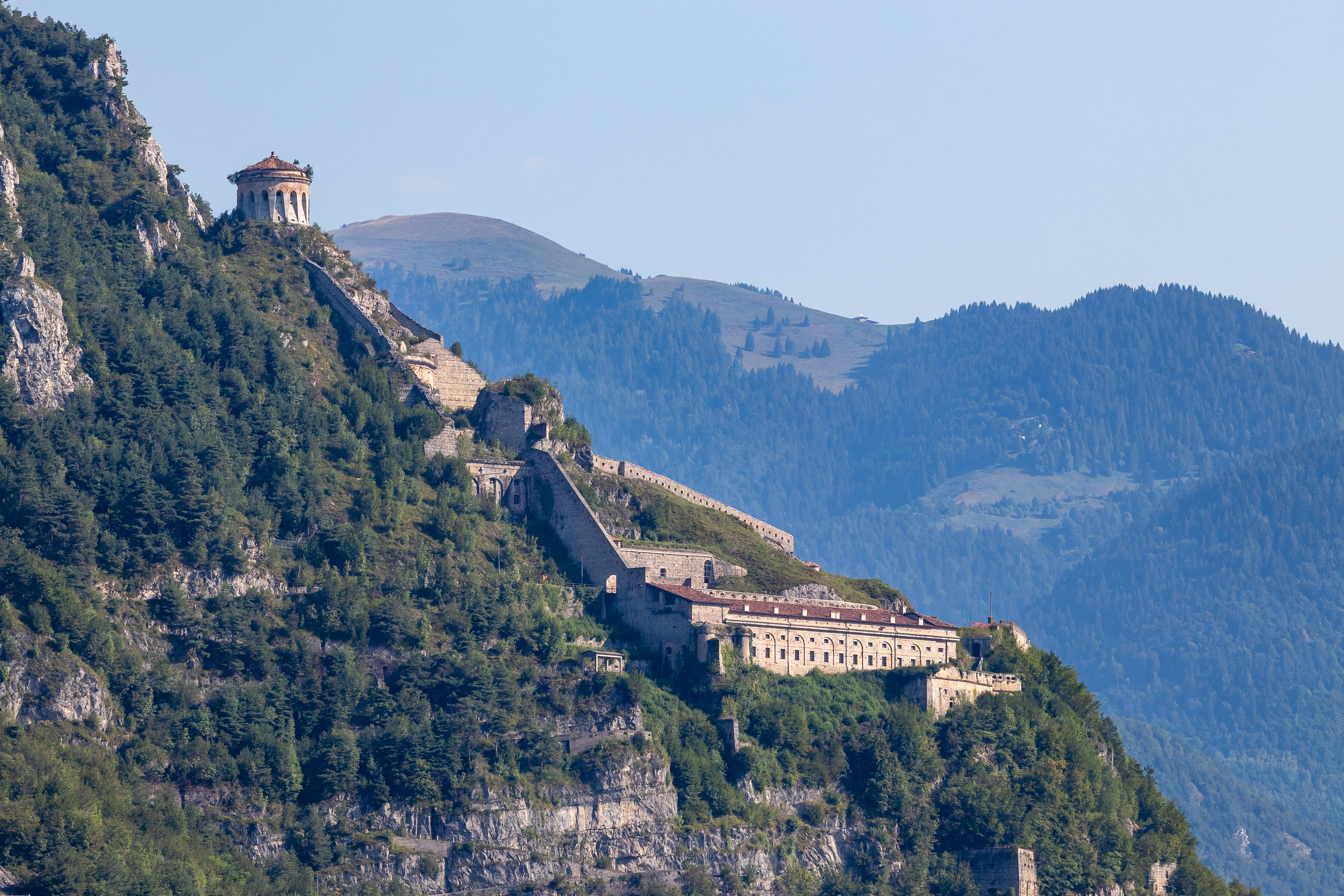
Rocca d'Anfo in 2018

Rocca d'Anfo (English: Rock of Anfo or Fort Anfo) is an historic military fortification in Anfo (now in Brescia, northern Italy) adjacent to Lake Idro. It was first built by the Venetian Republic in the 15th century on the eastern slope of Mount Censo in the Brescia and Garda Prealps. The stronghold was later expanded under Napoleon in the early 1800s.
