= Irene Stefani =

20th-century Italian Catholic religious sister

Blessed Irene Stefani IMC
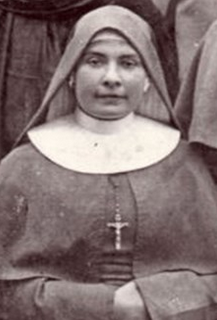
- Irene Stefani in 1920
- Born: Aurelia Mercede Stefani; 22 August 1891; Anfo, Brescia, Kingdom of Italy
- Died: 31 October 1930 (aged 39); Gikondi, Mukurweini, Nyeri, British Kenya
- Venerated in: Roman Catholic Church
- Beatified: 23 May 2015, Nyeri, Kenya by Cardinal Polycarp Pengo
- Feast: 31 October

Irene Stefani, IMC (born Aurelia Mercede Stefani; 22 August 1891 – 31 October 1930) was an Italian religious sister of the Consolata Missionaries. She assumed the religious name Irene upon her investiture and was sent to the mission in Kenya, where she died in 1930 of bubonic plague. She was beatified in 2015 by Cardinal Polycarp Pengo on behalf of Pope Francis.

== Biography ==
Stefani was born in 1891 in the small village of Anfo as one of twelve children and was baptized as Aurelia Jacoba Mercede on the following day, 23 August. She received Confirmation on 6 November 1898 and later received her First Communion a few years following this. Her mother died on 12 May 1907 and this left Stefani in the delicate position of the management of her siblings and assisting her father, especially in the Christian formation of her younger sisters Marietta and Antonietta, and her brother Ugo who died not long after this.

Stefani joined the Consolata Missionaries in Turin in June 1911 and made her first vows on 29 January 1914, prior to the beginning of World War I. That same year, she was sent to go to Kenya, leaving on 28 December 1914, where she arrived in January 1915 in Mombasa. She served as a nurse in Kenya and became well known and well regarded among the people that she served. This earned her the nickname "Nyaatha" (Nyina wa tha) ("mother of mercy"). With the onslaught of World War I, Stefani served in hospitals to tend to the wounded soldiers and those others wounded in the conflict. On 20 August 1916, she was appointed to assist the carriers who were forced to march exhaustingly in the African terrain. During this time, she worked as a Red Cross nurse in military hospitals in places such as Lindi and Dar es Salaam in Tanzania and Kenya. She had zeal for the salvation of souls and baptised 3000 in articulo mortis.

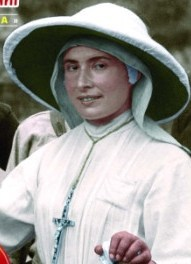
Blessed Irene Stefani circa 1920

At the conclusion of the war in 1918, Stefani returned to Nyeri where she first served as an assistant formator of the first aspirants of the incipient local congregation known as the Mary Immaculate Sisters. Two years later, she was appointed to Our Lady of Divine Providence mission at Gikondi, remaining there until her death. There, she taught in schools and instructed parishioners in catechism while visiting the villages. At Gikondi, she was the Superior of the Consolata Missionary Sisters for eight years.

In October 1930, Stefani offered to God her life for the mission. She contracted a disease from one of the patients she was treating and grew physically weak in the summer, losing a considerable amount of weight. On 20 October, she felt sick yet opted to visit a plague-stricken person, remaining at his bedside for several hours. She succumbed eleven days later, on 31 October 1930.

== Beatification process ==
The beatification process commenced on 22 July 1985 under Pope John Paul II and Stefani was declared a Servant of God. On 2 April 2011, Pope Benedict XVI declared her to have lived a life of heroic virtue and declared her to be Venerable. On 12 June 2014, Pope Francis approved a decree that recognized a miracle attributed to Stefani's intercession. The miracle happened in 1989 in Mozambique during the civil war where about 270 people were trapped in a parish church in Nipepe and prayed for Stefani's help. The contents of the Holy Water baptismal font increased and sustained the crowd for four days until help arrived. The beatification was celebrated by Cardinal Polycarp Pengo, the Papal delegate on 23 May 2015 in Nyeri. Stefani's canonisation cause is the second among the Consolata nuns in Africa after the 2018 beatification in Italy of Sr. Leonella Sgorbati. The Consolata Sisters in Turin who were promoting the cause of her beatification established a Sr. Irene Study Center that publishes books about her life. Stefani's feast day is 31 October.

== Memorial Shrine ==
Irene Stefani Nyaatha Shrine was officially opened and blessed by John Cardinal Njue on 17 February 2017, in honour of Stefani. The shrine has a chapel and an art gallery with the chronological biography of Stefani's life history. It is built around the foundation of the house Stefani lived in, behind Our Lady of Providence Gikondi Parish where she worked for 10 years during her mission in Nyeri. The shrine is a physical sign of the presence and service of Stefani to the community and people she served. It is a historic, religious, and pilgrimage site for prayer, solace, and reflection of Stefanis' selfless service, compassion, love for the poor and sick, and commitment to providing education, healthcare and spiritual growth of the community. It is a house of mercy, love and reconciliation where people not only pray for their needs but also entrust God to intervene in the needs of people in the community, nation and the world. The Nipepe Parish church became Blessed Irene's Shrine after the miracle in 1989.
