= Ponte Caffaro =

Coordinates: 45°50′N 10°32′E

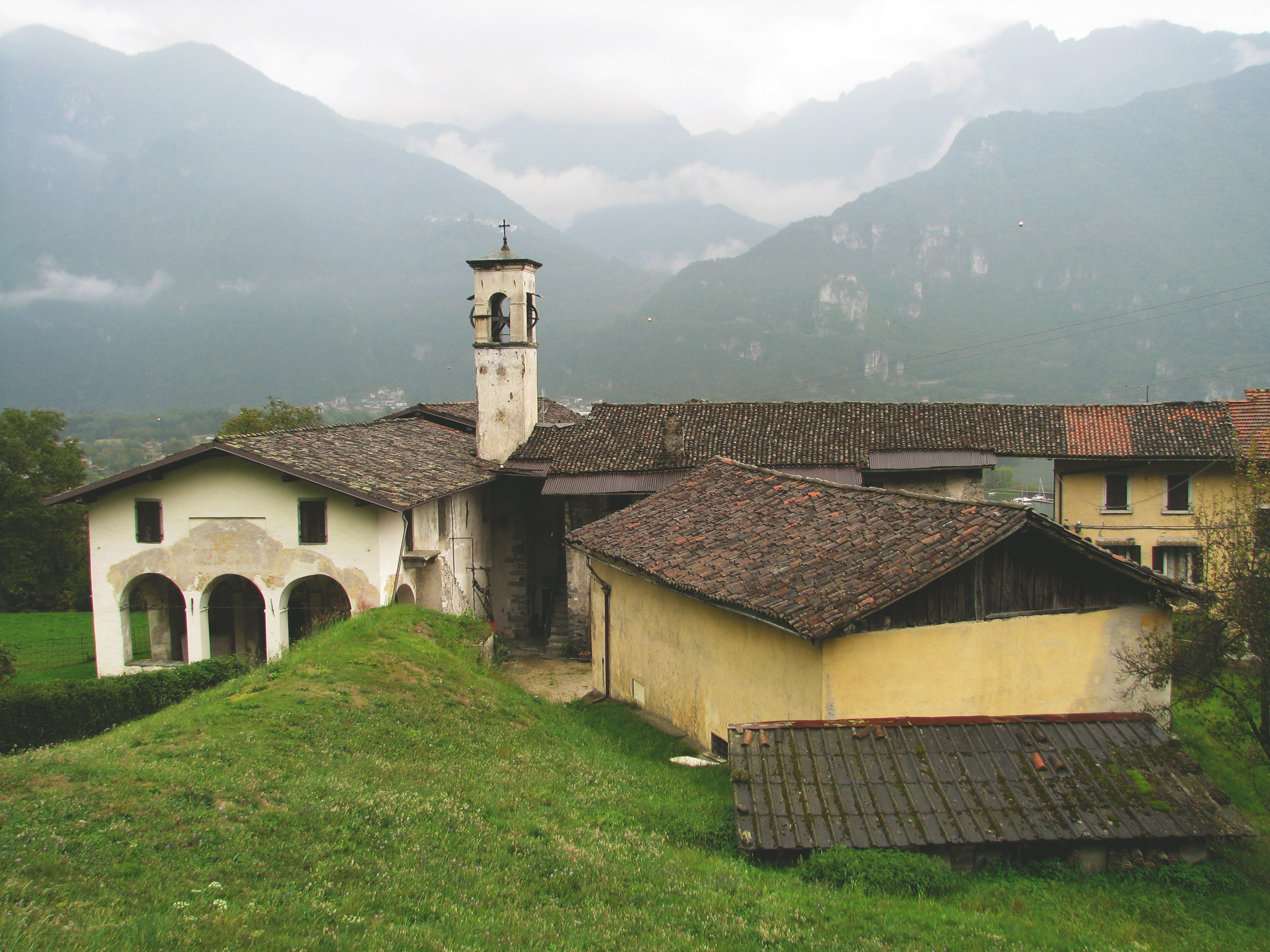

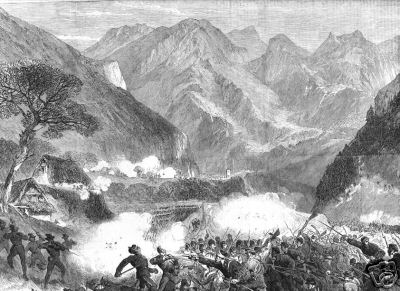
The battle of Ponte Caffaro, from The Illustrated London News", 11 August 1866.

Ponte Caffaro (literally Caffaro Bridge) is a settlement at the northern end of Lake Idro, in northern Italy, where the rivers Caffaro and Chiese enter the lake. Administratively it is a frazione of the commune of Bagolino, in the province of Brescia, Lombardy.

== Geography ==
The Caffaro here marks the boundary between the Italian provinces of Brescia and Trentino; until the beginning of the twentieth century this was the boundary between Italy and Austria.

== History ==
The Battle of Ponte Caffaro was fought on the 25 June 1866. It was one of the opening skirmishes of the Third Italian War of Independence, between the Italian forces of Garibaldi and the Austrian Empire.

== See also ==
- it:Battaglia di Ponte Caffaro - detailed account of the battle (in Italian)
