= Storo =

- Comune
- Comune di Storo
- Location within Italy Location within Trentino-Alto Adige/Südtirol
- Coordinates: 45°51′N 10°35′E
- Country: Italy
- Region: Trentino-Alto Adige/Südtirol
- Province: Trentino (TN)
- Frazioni: Darzo, Lodrone, Riccomassimo

Government
  - Mayor: Nicola Zontini

Area
  - Total: 62.9 km^{2} (24.3 sq mi)
- Elevation: 409 m (1,342 ft)

Population (Dec. 2004)
  - Total: 4,554
  - Density: 72.4/km^{2} (188/sq mi)
- Demonym: Storesi
- Time zone: UTC+1 (CET)
  - Summer (DST): UTC+2 (CEST)
- Postal code: 38089
- Dialing code: 0465
- Website: Official website

Storo (Stòr in local dialect) is a comune (municipality) in Trentino in the northern Italian region Trentino-Alto Adige/Südtirol, located about 50 kilometres (31 mi) southwest of Trento. As of 31 December 2004, it had a population of 4,554 and an area of 62.9 square kilometres (24.3 mi^{2}).

The municipality of Storo contains the frazioni (subdivisions, mainly villages and hamlets) Darzo, Lodrone and Riccomassimo.

Storo borders the following municipalities: Condino, Bagolino, Brione, Ledro and Bondone.

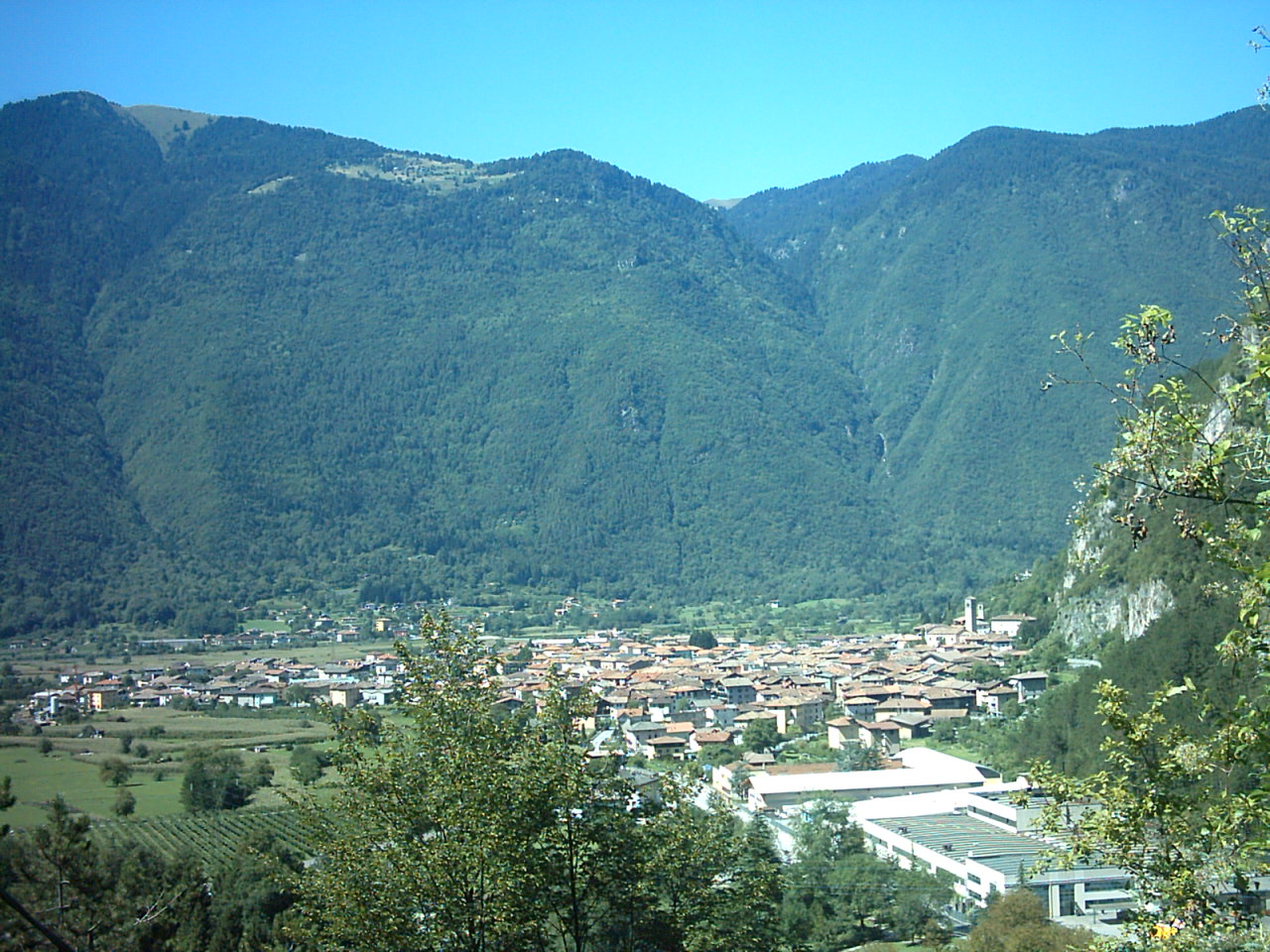
Panorama of Storo

== Population ==
Historical population

Year	Pop.	±%
1861	?	—
1871	?	—
1881	?	—
1901	?	—
1911	?	—

Year	Pop.	±%
1921	2,845	—
1931	2,585	−9.1%
1936	2,681	+3.7%
1951	3,090	+15.3%
1961	3,509	+13.6%

Year	Pop.	±%
1971	3,688	+5.1%
1981	3,954	+7.2%
1991	4,131	+4.5%
2001	4,439	+7.5%
2011	4,704	+6.0%

Source: Data from ISTAT
