= Chiese (river) =

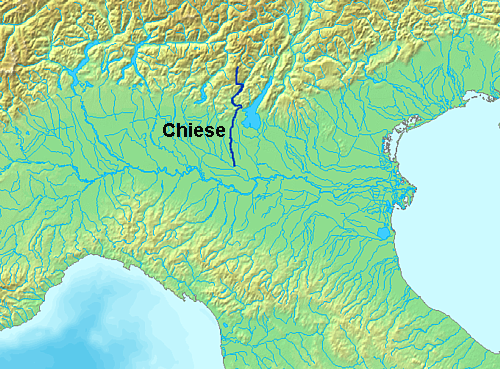

Location
- Country: Italy

Physical characteristics
- Source
  - location: Vedretta di Fumo, Monte Fumo, Adamello, Trentino
- Mouth: Oglio
  - coordinates: 45.1414°N 10.4209°E
- Length: 160 km (99 mi)
- Discharge
  - average: 36 m^{3}/s (1,300 cu ft/s)

Basin features
- Progression: Oglio
- Tributaries
  - right: Caffaro, Re di Anfo

The Chiese, also known in the Province of Brescia as the Clisi, is a 160-kilometre (99 mi) Italian river that is the principal immissary and sole emissary of the sub-alpine lake Lago d’Idro (Lake Idro), and is a left tributary of the Oglio.

The river rises from the Adamello in Trentino and runs through the Val di Fumo and the Val di Daone, forming the reservoirs of Lago di Malga Bissina and Lago di Malga Boazzo. At Pieve di Bono it enters the lower valleys of Giudicarie, receiving the waters of the torrente Adanà. Further south it flows through the Lago d'Idro near Baitoni before running down into Lombardy and the Province of Brescia.

After leaving the lake, the river runs through the Val Sabbia as far as Roè Volciano. Here it enters the pianura padana, and flows south through Gavardo, Calcinato, Montichiari, Carpenedolo and Acquafredda, enters the Province of Mantua at Asola, before flowing into the Oglio on its left bank in the valley of Acquanegra sul Chiese.

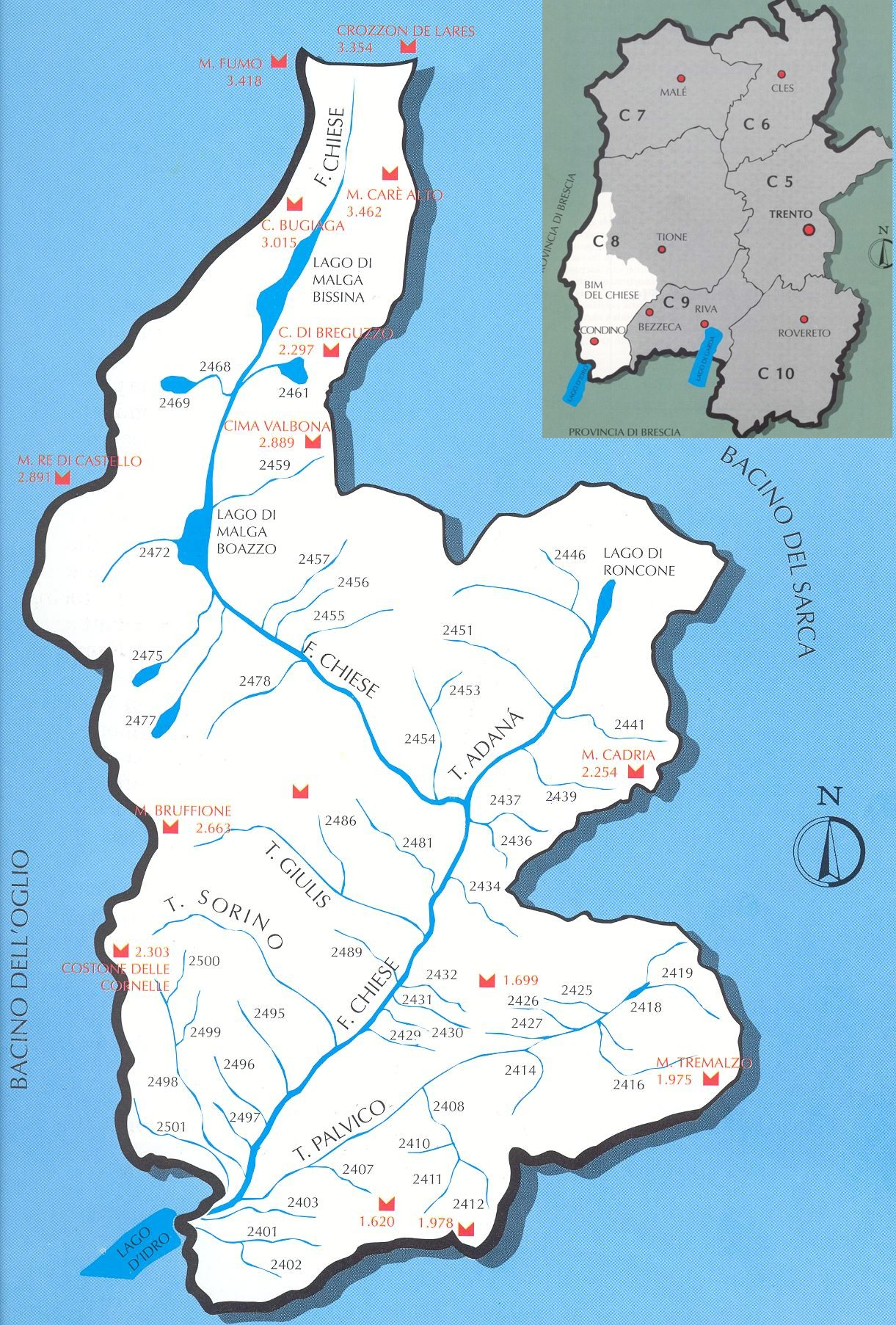
Mountain drainage basin of the Chiese river in Trentino area.

== Exploitation as a source of hydropower ==
Like its twin the Sarca, the river is born of the glaciers of the Parco naturale provinciale dell'Adamello-Brenta and its waters are intensively used for the production of hydro-electricity. Within the highly restricted area of its drainage basin above Lago d’Idro there are at least four artificial lakes and three hydro-electric power stations. The lower course of the river in Lombardy is also used for this purpose.
