= Bagolino =

- Comune
- Comune di Bagolino
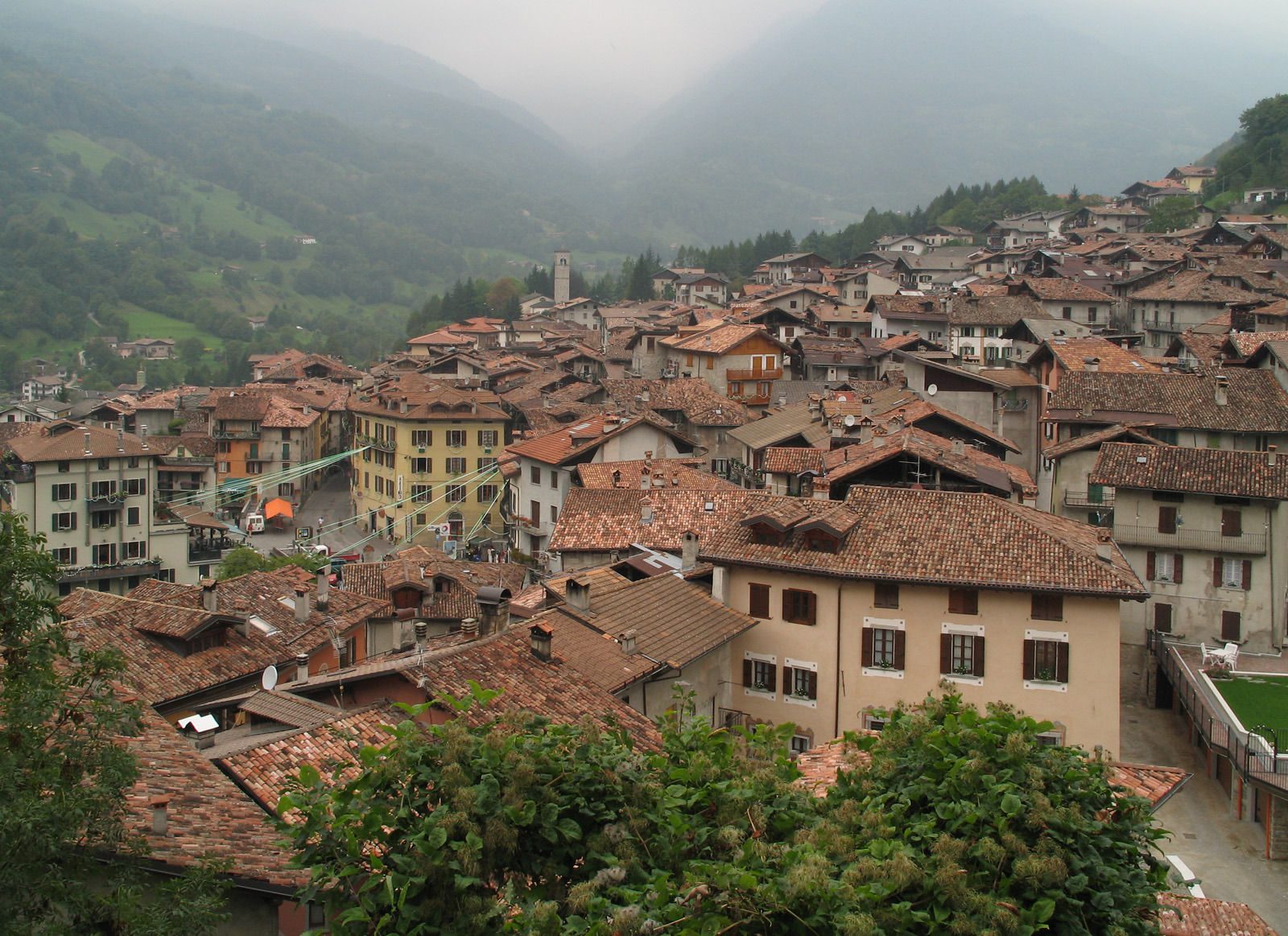
- View of Bagolino

- Coat of arms

- Location within Italy Location within Lombardy
- Coordinates: 45°49′N 10°28′E
- Country: Italy
- Region: Lombardy
- Province: Province of Brescia BS
- Frazioni: Ponte Caffaro

Government
  - Mayor: Gianzeno Marca

Area
  - Total: 109 km^{2} (42 sq mi)
- Elevation: 778 m (2,552 ft)

Population (2011)
  - Total: 3,960
  - Density: 36.3/km^{2} (94.1/sq mi)
- Demonym: Bagossi
- Time zone: UTC+1 (CET)
  - Summer (DST): UTC+2 (CEST)
- Postal code: 25072
- Dialing code: 0365
- Patron saint: Saint George
- Saint day: 23 April
- Website: Official website

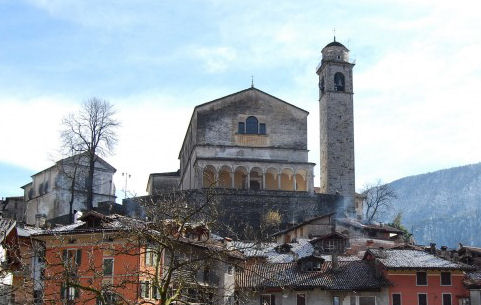
san Giorgio church

Bagolino (Brescian: Bagulì) is a comune in the province of Brescia, in Lombardy, Italy, in the valley of the river Caffaro, on the right side of Valle Sabbia. Bagolino is known for the cheese named Bagòss and the carnival. Similar to grana padano, Bagòss is a salty cheese with traces of natural mold at times.

The village retains its medieval appearance, with abutting historical buildings and winding streets, arcades, squares, fountains, and narrow stairs that go up to the church of St. George.

The frazione Ponte Caffaro lies on the shore of Lake Idro.

== Neighbouring communes ==
- Anfo
- Bienno
- Bondone (Trentino)
- Breno
- Collio
- Condino (TN)
- Idro
- Lavenone
- Prestine
- Storo (TN)

== Physical Geography ==
Territory

Bagolino is placed inside the Caffaro Valley, a tributary valley of the Sabbia Valley.

== Twin towns ==
Bagolino is twinned with:

- Oettingen in Bayern, Germany, since 2000
- Mozac, France, since 2009
