= Bondone (disambiguation) =

Bondone may refer to:

- Bondone, commune in Trentino, Italy
- Monte Bondone, mountain in Trentino, Italy
- Giotto di Bondone (1270-1337), Italian painter
