= Re di Anfo =

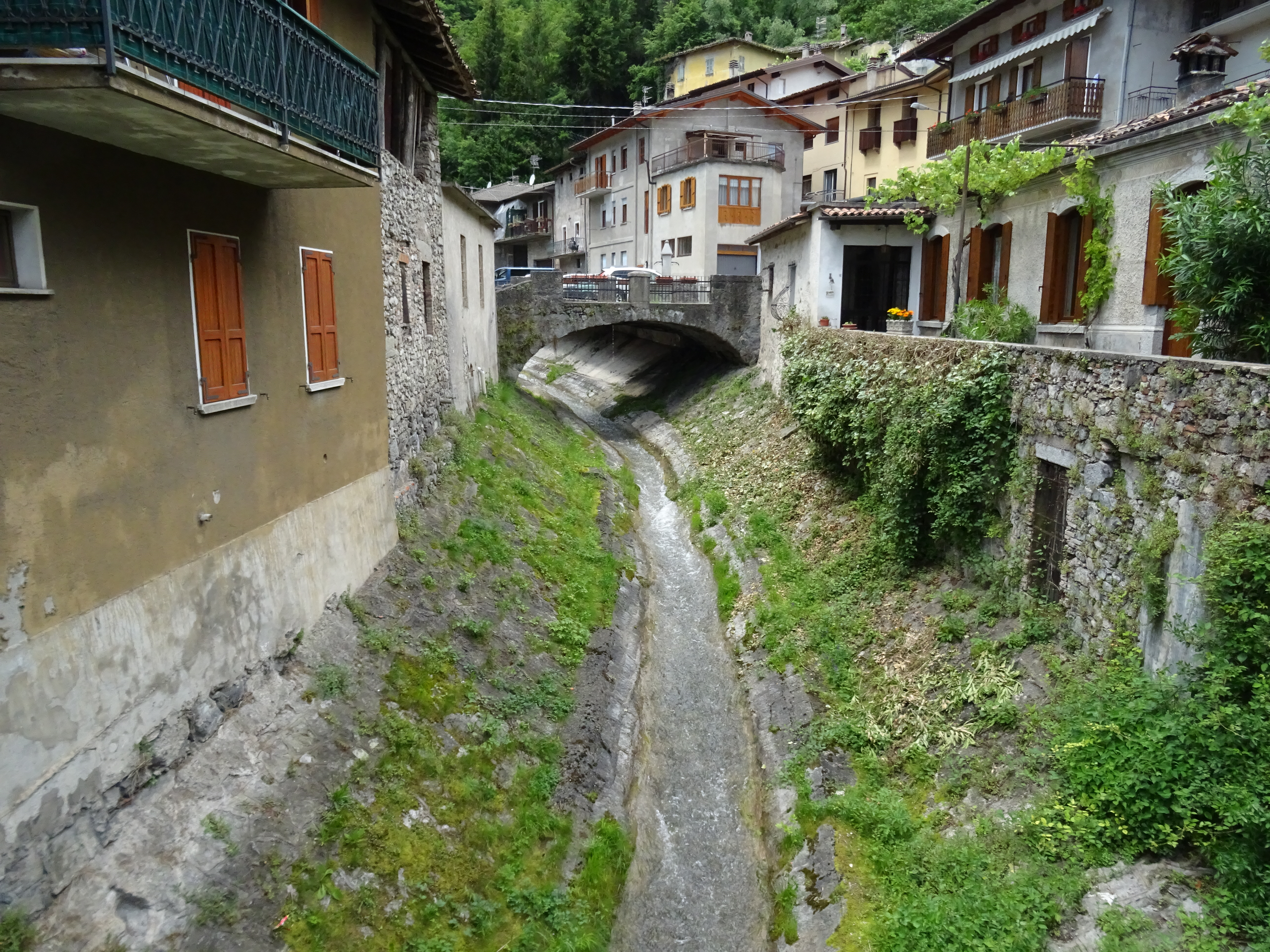

Location
- Country: Italy

Physical characteristics
- Source
  - location: Cima Meghè
  - elevation: 1,801 m (5,909 ft)
- Mouth
  - location: Lake Idro at Anfo
  - coordinates: 45.7650°N 10.4973°E
  - elevation: 368 m (1,207 ft)
- Length: 6 km (3.7 mi)

Basin features
- Progression: Lake Idro→ Chiese→ Oglio→ Po→ Adriatic Sea

The Re di Anfo is a stream (or torrente) in the Province of Brescia, Lombardy. Its source is on Cima Meghè and it flows into Lago d'Idro at Anfo on the western side of the lake. Its entire course is contained within the territory of the Commune of Anfo.

A short stretch of the river is suitable for the sport of canyoning.
