= Condino =

- Comune
- Comune di Condino
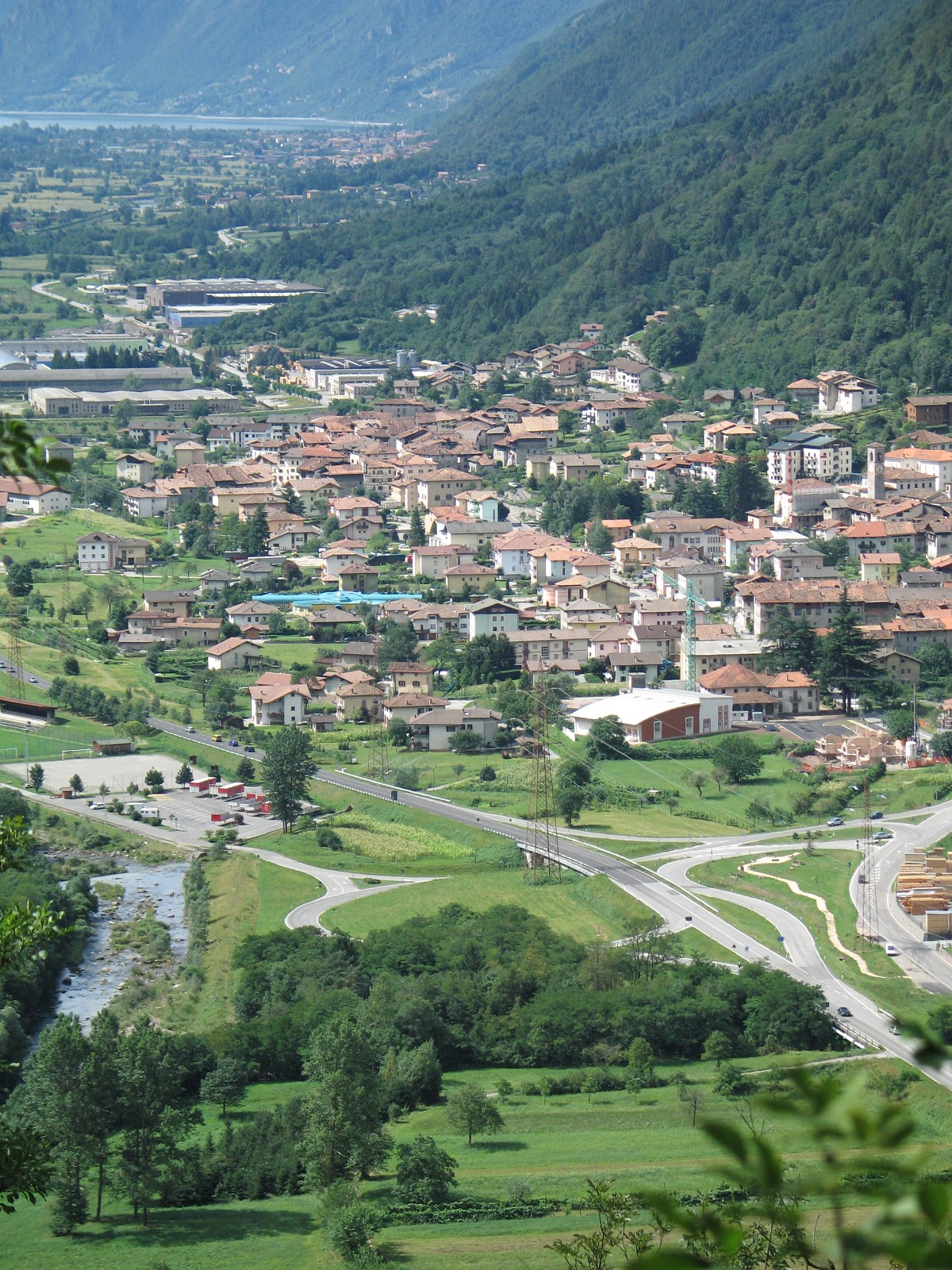

- Location within Trentino-Alto Adige/Südtirol Location within Italy
- Coordinates: 45°53′N 10°36′E
- Country: Italy
- Region: Trentino-Alto Adige/Südtirol
- Province: Trentino (TN)

Area
  - Total: 33.8 km^{2} (13.1 sq mi)
- Elevation: 444 m (1,457 ft)

Population (Dec. 2004)
  - Total: 1,507
  - Density: 44.6/km^{2} (115/sq mi)
- Demonym: Condinesi
- Time zone: UTC+1 (CET)
  - Summer (DST): UTC+2 (CEST)
- Postal code: 38083
- Dialing code: 0465

Condino (German: Kunden) is a former comune, now a frazione of Borgo Chiese in Trentino in the northern Italian region Trentino-Alto Adige/Südtirol, located about 45 kilometres (28 mi) southwest of Trento. As of 31 December 2004, it had a population of 1,507 and an area of 33.8 square kilometres (13.1 mi^{2}).

Condino borders the following municipalities: Daone, Breno, Castel Condino, Bagolino, Cimego, Brione, Ledro and Storo.

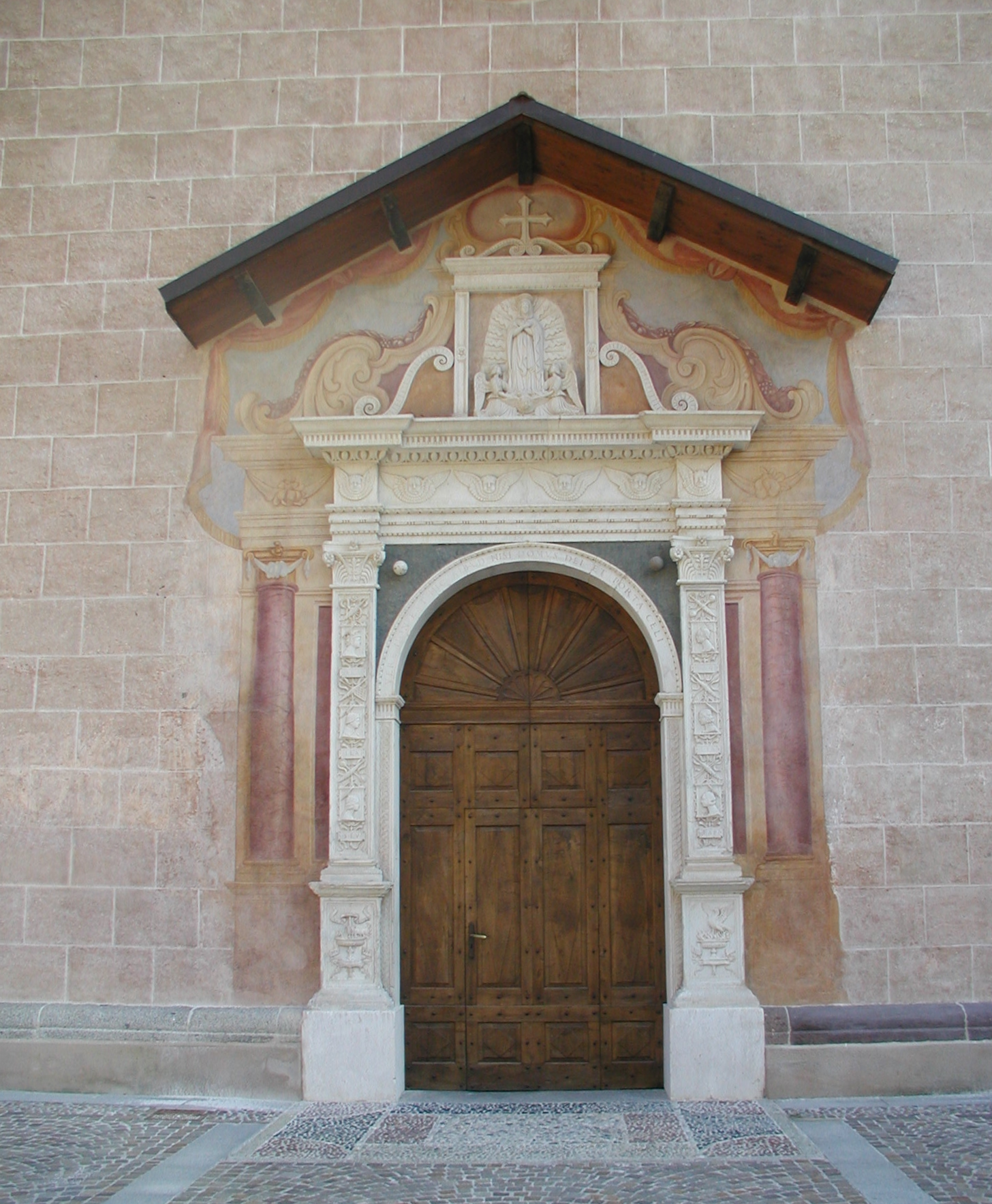
The marble portal of the Parish church

== Demographic evolution ==
Historical population

Year	Pop.	±%
1861	?	—
1871	?	—
1881	?	—
1901	?	—
1911	?	—

Year	Pop.	±%
1921	1,499	—
1931	1,298	−13.4%
1936	1,275	−1.8%
1951	1,241	−2.7%
1961	1,297	+4.5%

Year	Pop.	±%
1971	1,372	+5.8%
1981	1,391	+1.4%
1991	1,420	+2.1%
2001	1,495	+5.3%

Source: Data from ISTAT
