= Borgo Chiese =

- Comune
- Comune di Borgo Chiese
- Location within Italy Location within Trentino-Alto Adige/Südtirol
- Coordinates: 45°53′26.16″N 10°36′4.68″E
- Country: Italy
- Region: Trentino-Alto Adige/Südtirol
- Province: Trentino (TN)
- Frazioni: Brione, Cimego, Condino

Government
  - Mayor: Renato Sartori

Area
  - Total: 53.72 km^{2} (20.74 sq mi)

Population (2026)
  - Total: 1,926
  - Density: 35.85/km^{2} (92.86/sq mi)
- Time zone: UTC+1 (CET)
  - Summer (DST): UTC+2 (CEST)
- Postal code: 38083
- Dialing code: 0465
- Website: Official website

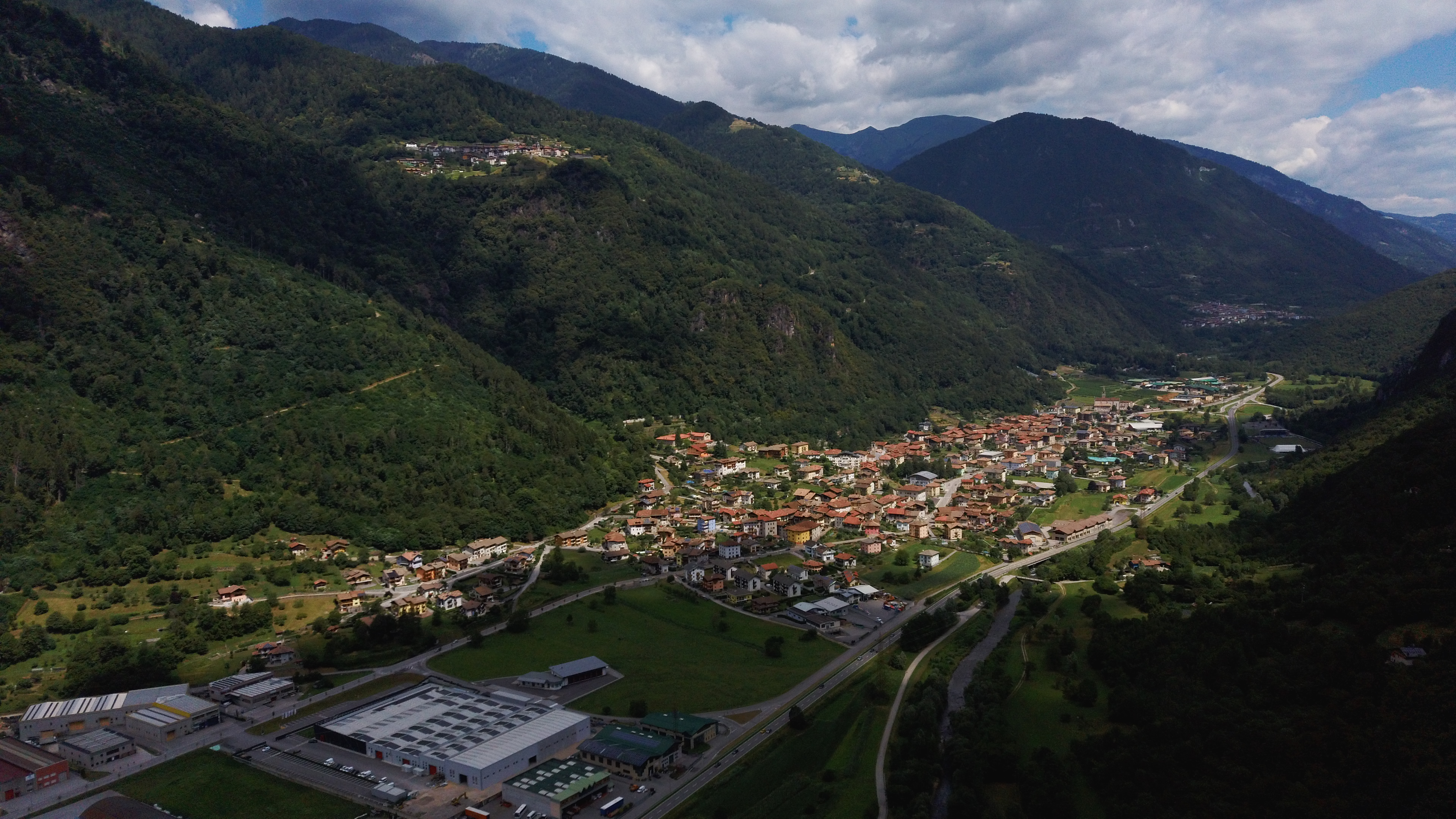
Borgo Chiese, Trentino, Italy.

Borgo Chiese is a comune (municipality) in the Province of Trentino in the Italian region Trentino-Alto Adige/Südtirol.

It was established on 1 January 2016 by the merger of the municipalities of Brione, Cimego and Condino.
