= Daone =

- Comune
- Comune di Daone
- Location within Italy Location within Trentino-Alto Adige/Südtirol
- Coordinates: 45°57′N 10°37′E
- Country: Italy
- Region: Trentino-Alto Adige/Südtirol
- Province: Trentino (TN)

Area
  - Total: 158.6 km^{2} (61.2 sq mi)

Population (Dec. 2004)
  - Total: 591
  - Density: 3.73/km^{2} (9.65/sq mi)
- Time zone: UTC+1 (CET)
  - Summer (DST): UTC+2 (CEST)
- Postal code: 38080
- Dialing code: 0465

Daone (Daùn in local dialect) was a comune (municipality) in Trentino in the northern Italian region Trentino-Alto Adige/Südtirol, located about 40 kilometres (25 mi) southwest of Trento. As of 31 December 2004, it had a population of 591 and an area of 158.6 square kilometres (61.2 mi^{2}).

It was merged with Bersone and Praso on January 1, 2015, to form a new municipality, Valdaone.

Daone borders the following municipalities: Spiazzo, Strembo, Saviore dell'Adamello, Massimeno, Pelugo, Cevo, Villa Rendena, Breguzzo, Creto, Roncone, Praso, Lardaro, Breno, Bersone, Condino, Castel Condino and Cimego.

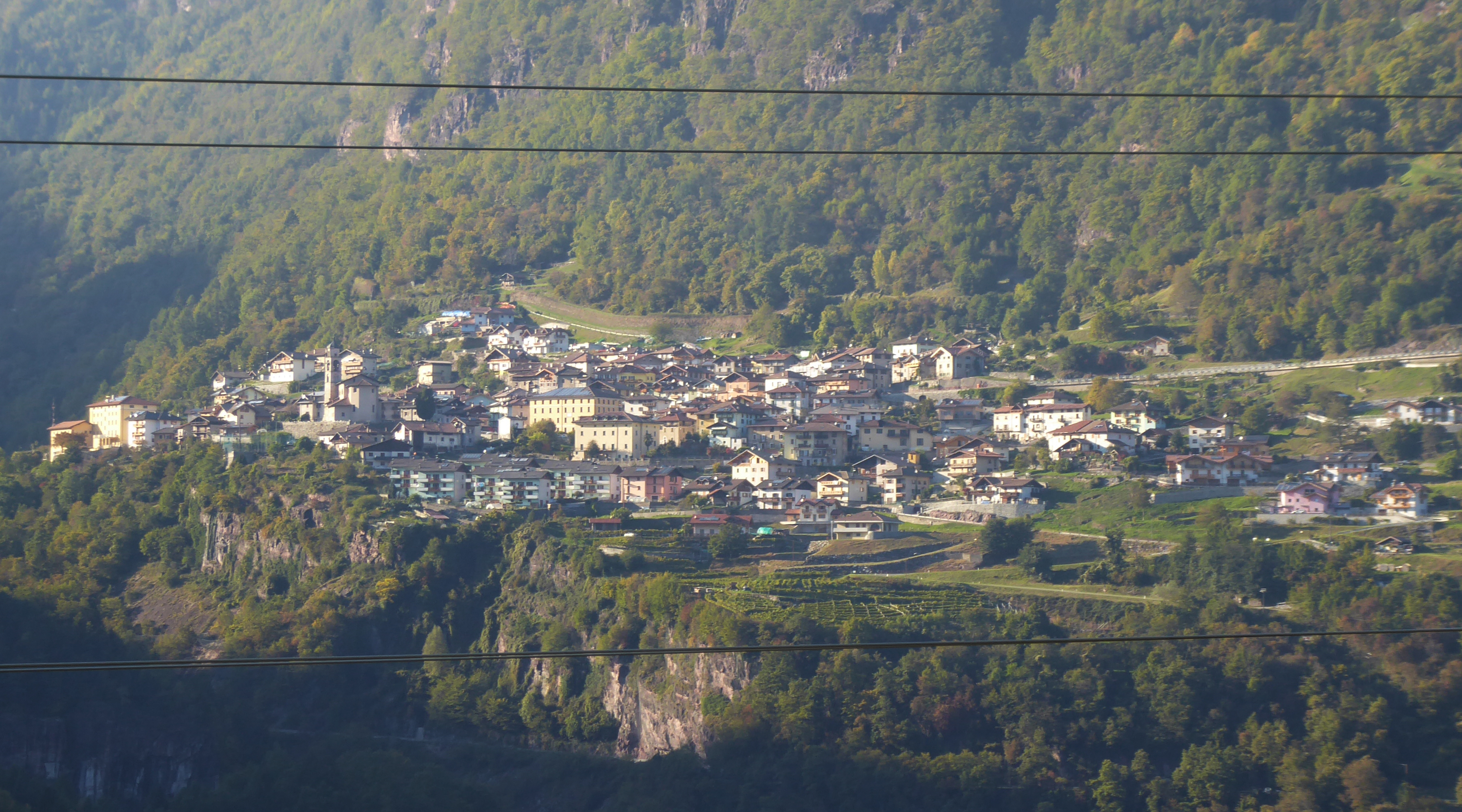
The commune of Daone

== Demographic evolution ==
Historical population

Year	Pop.	±%
1861	?	—
1871	?	—
1881	?	—
1901	?	—
1911	?	—

Year	Pop.	±%
1921	757	—
1931	674	−11.0%
1936	669	−0.7%
1951	653	−2.4%
1961	701	+7.4%

Year	Pop.	±%
1971	669	−4.6%
1981	629	−6.0%
1991	609	−3.2%
2001	587	−3.6%

Source: Data from ISTAT
