= Santa Olímpia (village) =

Santa Olímpia is located in the rural area of Piracicaba, São Paulo, Brazil approximately 22 km North-West of central Piracicaba. The village was founded in 1892 by Tyrolean immigrants from the former Austrian Trentino (today part of Italy). Santana (village) also represents the Tyrolean colony in Piracicaba.

== History ==
By the end of 19th century, the Austria-Hungary empire faced several regional conflicts resulted from economic hardships and cultural differences. This crisis resulted in poverty and high unemployment rates compelling many families to immigrate. During this period, immigration was intense in Brazil: large numbers of Europeans, especially Italians, started to be brought to the country to work in the harvest of coffee and then replace the slavery workforce (abolished in 1888). From 1877 to 1903, almost two million immigrants arrived in Brazil.

During the Austria-Hungary empire, Tyrol was divided in two regions: North Tyrol and Trentino-Alto Adige/Südtirol. Tyrolean immigrants who settled in Santa Olímpia came from Etschtal (Italian: Val d'Adige), name given to that part of alpine valley of the Adige in Italy.

In the end of World War I and following the fall of the Austria-Hungary Empire, the southern parts of Tyrol, i.e. Trentino and South Tyrol, were annexed to Italy while North Tyrol became part of the new Austrian Republic.

== Culture ==
Coming from the Etschtal-Val d'Adige in Trentino, people living in Santa Olímpia still keep alive the Tyrolean culture and tradition.

Folk Dance

- Grupo Santa Olímpia (Santa Olímpia)
- Grupo Folclórico Cortesano (Santana)
- Grupo Folclórico Avanti Trentini (Santana)
- Grupo Folclórico Nostalgia (Santana)

Choir

- Coro Stella Alpina (Santa Olímpia)
- Coro Càneva (Santa Olímpia)
- Coro infantil Và Pensiero (Santa Olímpia)
- Coro infantil Bambini Felici (Santana)

Musical ensemble

- Banda Típica Nostalgia (Santana)

Architecture

The architecture in Santa Olímpia (also in Santana) is rustic and simple remembering the colonial period. The buildings follow traditional Tyrolean architecture patterns as can be seen in houses and church built in Santa Olímpia.

Festival

Festa da Polenta is an annual celebration in Santa Olimpia. It is held on the last weekend of July and offers many attractions such as folk dance, music and traditional Tyrolean cuisine.

== Trivia ==
According to the narrative of the oldest residents, the last Emperor of Brazil, Dom Pedro II, visited Santa Olimpia in the end of 19th century. It is said that he was very pleased and also started a familiar conversation in German with local Tyroleans: Dom Pedro II was descendant of the Austrian Royal Family and his mother, Empress of Brazil Maria Leopoldine von Österreich, lived a few years in Innsbruck, capital of Tyrol (at that time North Tyrol).
