= Valdaone =

- Comune
- Comune di Valdaone
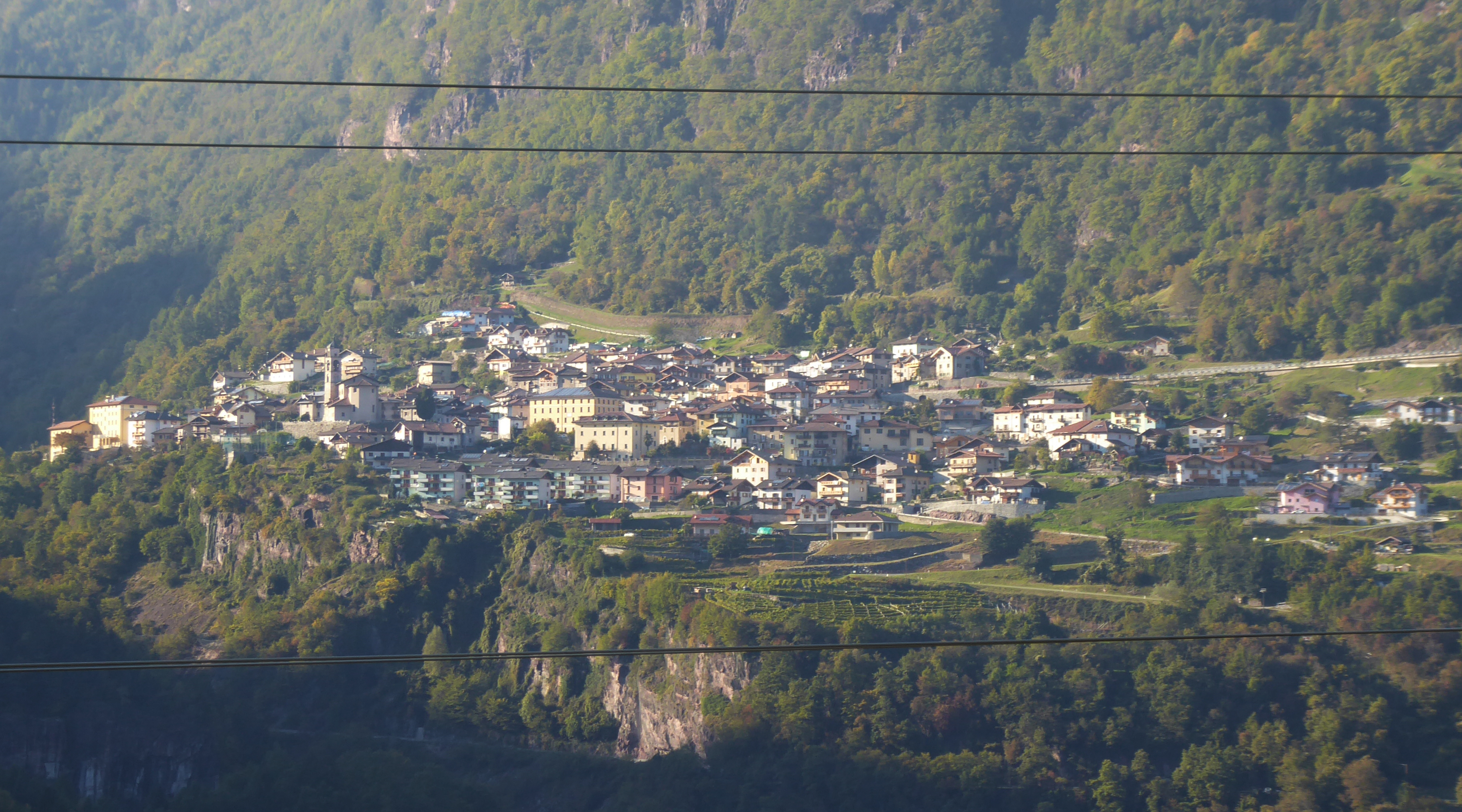

- Location within Italy Location within Trentino-Alto Adige/Südtirol
- Coordinates: 45°56′53.16″N 10°37′9.56″E
- Country: Italy
- Region: Trentino-Alto Adige/Südtirol
- Province: Trentino (TN)
- Frazioni: Bersone, Daone, Praso

Government
  - Mayor: Giorgio Bontempelli

Area
  - Total: 177.09 km^{2} (68.37 sq mi)

Population (30 June 2017)
  - Total: 1,169
  - Density: 6.601/km^{2} (17.10/sq mi)
- Time zone: UTC+1 (CET)
  - Summer (DST): UTC+2 (CEST)
- Postal code: 38091
- Dialing code: 0465
- Website: Official website

Valdaone is a comune (municipality) in the Province of Trentino in the Italian region Trentino-Alto Adige/Südtirol.

It was established on 1 January 2015 by the merger of the municipalities of Bersone, Daone and Praso.
