= Pieve di Bono-Prezzo =

- Comune
- Comune di Pieve di Bono-Prezzo
- Location within Italy Location within Trentino-Alto Adige/Südtirol
- Coordinates: 45°56′35″N 10°38′29″E
- Country: Italy
- Region: Trentino-Alto Adige/Südtirol
- Province: Trentino (TN)
- Frazioni: Agrone, Cologna, Creto (communal seat), Prezzo, Strada

Government
  - Mayor: Sergio Rota

Area
  - Total: 24.68 km^{2} (9.53 sq mi)
- Elevation: 514 m (1,686 ft)

Population (2021-12-31)
  - Total: 1,431
  - Density: 57.98/km^{2} (150.2/sq mi)
- Time zone: UTC+1 (CET)
  - Summer (DST): UTC+2 (CEST)
- Postal code: 38085
- Dialing code: 0465
- Website: Official website

Pieve di Bono-Prezzo is a comune (municipality) in Trentino in the northern Italian region Trentino-Alto Adige/Südtirol, located about 20 kilometres (12 mi) south of Trento. It was formed on 1 January 2016 as the merger of the previous communes of Pieve di Bono and Prezzo.
