= Roè Volciano =

Roè Volciano Roè Ulsà
- Comune
- Comune di Roè Volciano
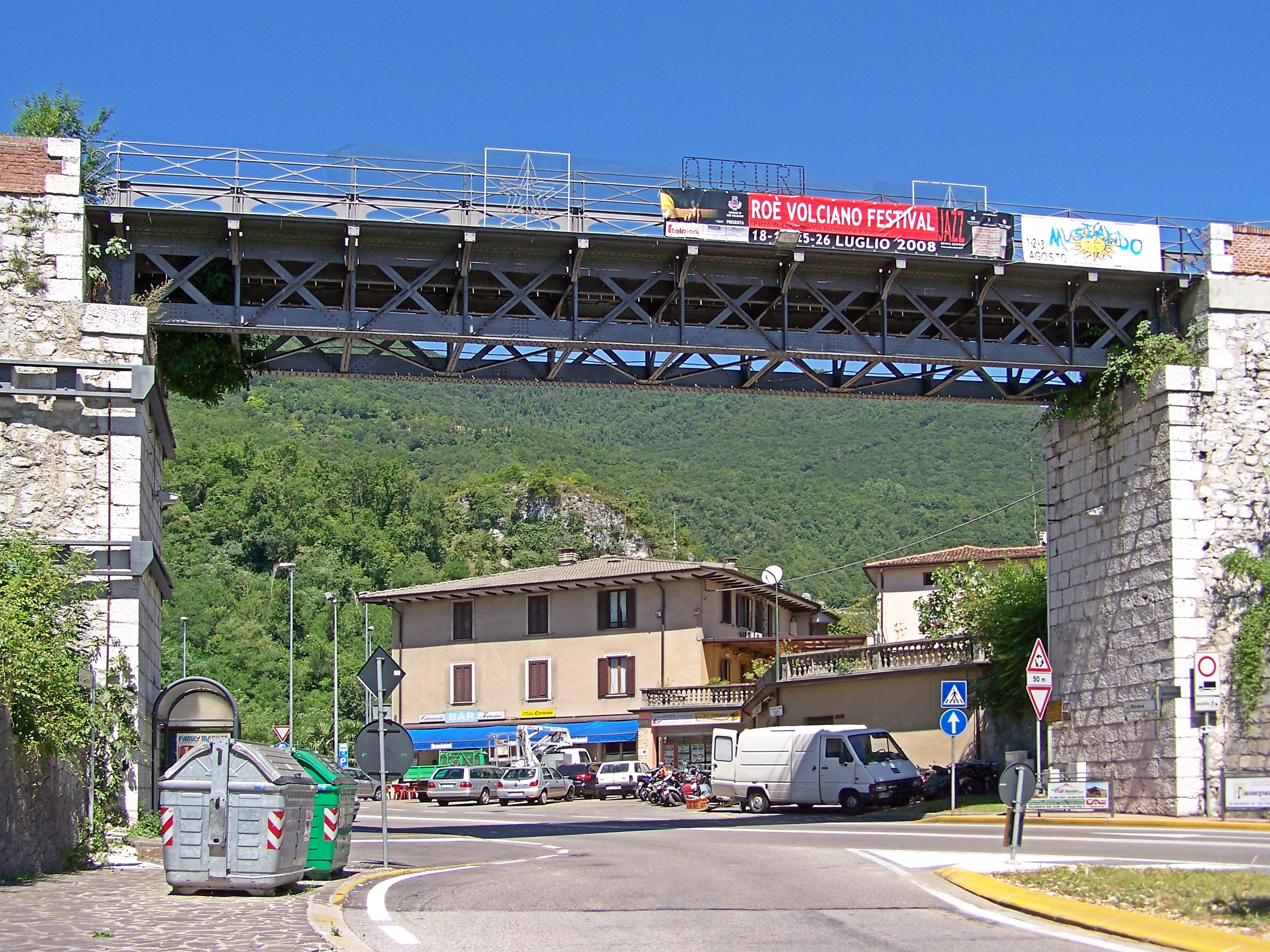

- Location within Italy Location within Lombardy
- Coordinates: 45°38′N 10°30′E
- Country: Italy
- Region: Lombardy
- Province: Brescia (BS)
- Frazioni: Agneto, Crocetta, Gazzane, Liano, Rucco, Tormini, Trobiolo, Volciano

Area
  - Total: 5 km^{2} (1.9 sq mi)

Population (2011)
  - Total: 4,556
  - Density: 910/km^{2} (2,400/sq mi)
- Demonym: Roè volcianesi
- Time zone: UTC+1 (CET)
  - Summer (DST): UTC+2 (CEST)
- Postal code: 25077
- Dialing code: 0365
- ISTAT code: 017164
- Patron saint: Saints Pietro and Paolo
- Website: Official website

Roè Volciano (Brescian: Roè Ulsà) is a comune in the province of Brescia, in Lombardy.
