= Valle Sabbia =

Coordinates: 45.7158°N 10.4181°E

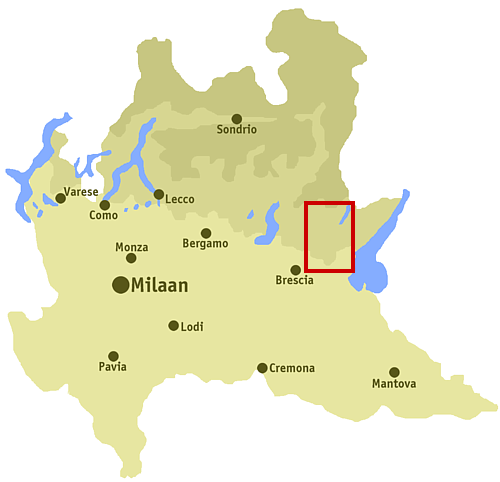
Position of the Valle Sabbia

The Valle Sabbia is the second-largest of the Tre Valli Bresciane (Three Brescian valleys), situated in the eastern part of the province of Brescia.

== Geography ==
Physically it constitutes a single valley with Val di Chiese. It is bounded by Lake Garda to the east, Val Trompia to the west, the Valli Giudicarie to the north and the Pianura Padana to south. The main approach is on Strada Statale 237 del Caffaro. It also contains the river Chiese, tributary and outlet of Lake Idro. Its most populous area is Gavardo, which includes the Valle's hospital.
