= Bondone =

- Comune
- Comune di Bondone
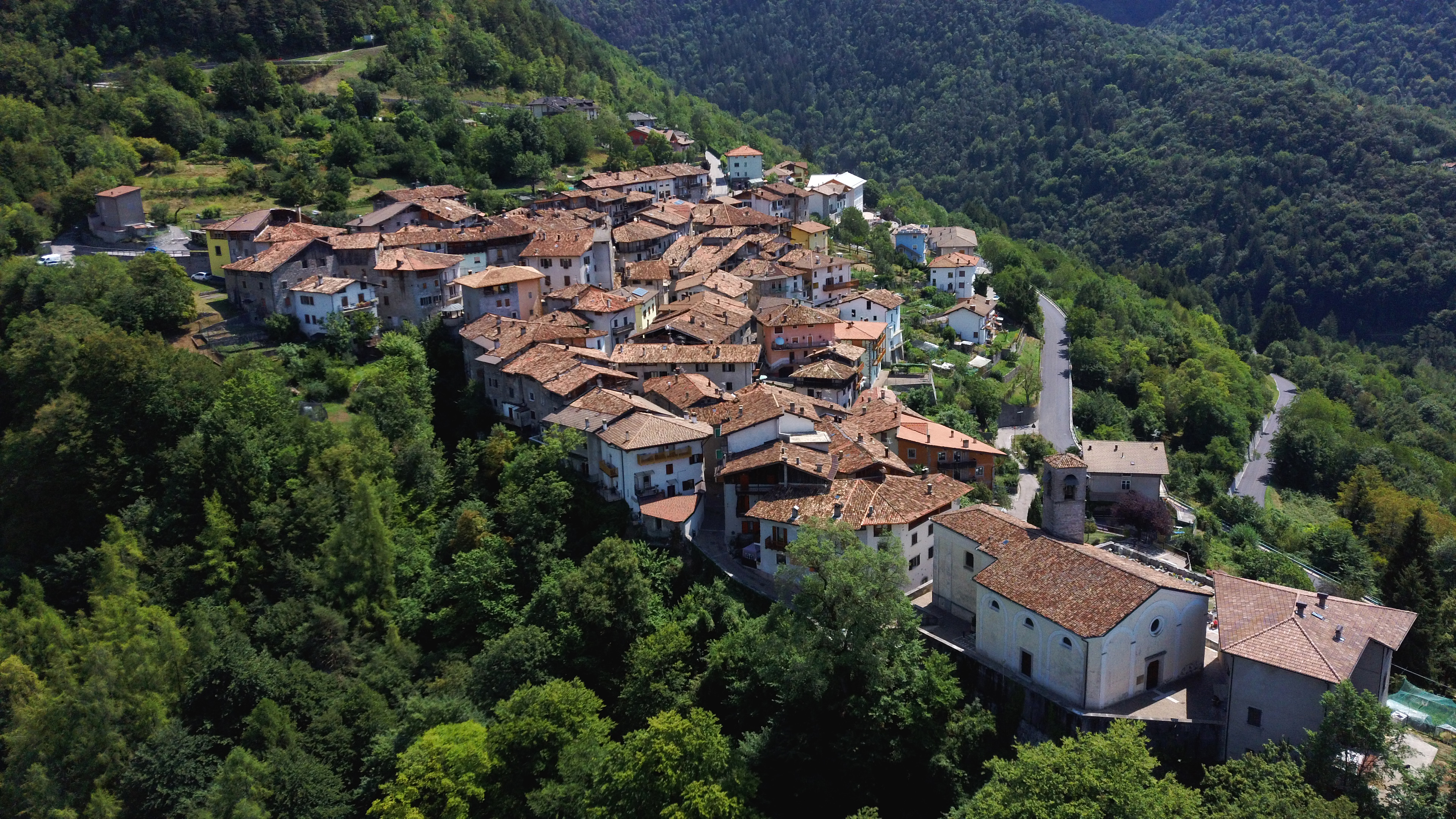

- Location within Italy Location within Trentino-Alto Adige/Südtirol
- Coordinates: 45°48′N 10°33′E
- Country: Italy
- Region: Trentino-Alto Adige/Südtirol
- Province: Trentino (TN)
- Frazioni: Baitoni

Government
  - Mayor: Chiara Cimarolli

Area
  - Total: 19.2 km^{2} (7.4 sq mi)
- Elevation: 720 m (2,360 ft)

Population (2026)
  - Total: 627
  - Density: 32.7/km^{2} (84.6/sq mi)
- Demonym: Bondonesi
- Time zone: UTC+1 (CET)
  - Summer (DST): UTC+2 (CEST)
- Postal code: 38080
- Dialing code: 0465
- Patron saint: The nativity of Mary
- Saint day: 8 September
- Website: Official website

Bondone (Bondù, /bon'du/ in local dialect) is a comune located about 50 kilometres (31 mi) southwest of Trento in Trentino in the northern Italian region Trentino-Alto Adige/Südtirol, on the border with Lombardy. It is As of 31 December 2004, it had a population of 693 and an area of 19.2 square kilometres (7.4 mi^{2}) divided approximately equally between the capoluogo and the frazione Baitoni which lies on the shores of Lake Idro.

The territory of the commune rises from an elevation of 368 metres (1,207 ft) at the lakeside to a maximum of 1,946 metres (6,385 ft). The Castello di San Giovanni, offers panoramic views of the lake, and of the valley of the Chiese, with the Dolomites of Brenta visible in the distance. Bondone is one of I Borghi più belli d'Italia ("The most beautiful villages of Italy").

== Neighbouring communes ==
In the province of Trento:

- Tiarno di Sopra
- Storo
- Ledro

In the province of Brescia, Lombardy:

- Bagolino
- Magasa
- Idro
- Valvestino

== Demographic evolution ==
Historical population

Year	Pop.	±%
1861	?	—
1871	?	—
1881	?	—
1901	?	—
1911	?	—

Year	Pop.	±%
1921	735	—
1931	720	−2.0%
1936	770	+6.9%
1951	871	+13.1%
1961	768	−11.8%

Year	Pop.	±%
1971	710	−7.6%
1981	677	−4.6%
1991	665	−1.8%
2001	667	+0.3%

Source: Data from ISTAT
