= Caffaro (river) =

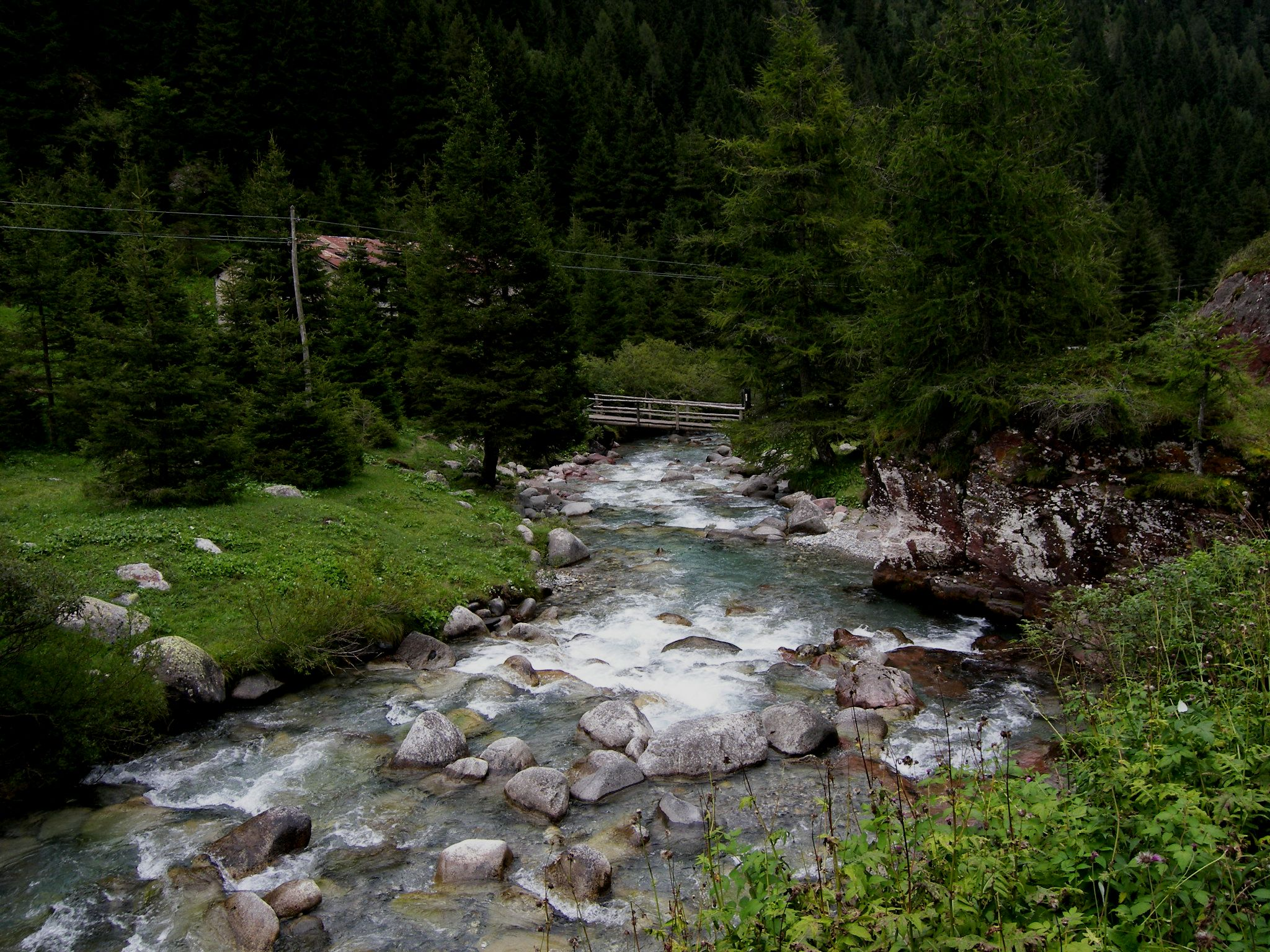

Location
- Country: Italy

Physical characteristics
- Source
  - location: Passo del Termine
- Mouth
  - location: Chiese at Ponte Caffaro
  - coordinates: 45.8097°N 10.5313°E
  - elevation: 368 m (1,207 ft)
- Length: 25 km (16 mi)

Basin features
- Progression: Chiese→ Oglio

The Caffaro is a 25 km river of northern Italy whose course lies within the Province of Brescia, sometimes forming the border with Trentino. It belongs to the basin of Lago d'Idro.

Its source is on Cornone di Blumone, a peak in the Rhaetian Alps, near the Passo del Termine within the commune of Breno, in the Parco regionale dell'Adamello regional park. The river then runs through the Val di Caffaro entering the territory of Bagolino and flows into the Chiese just before the latter enters lago d'Idro at Ponte Caffaro.

The Caffaro's principal affluents are the Riccomassimo, the Rio Frèi, the Dazare, the Bruffione, the Lajone, the Sanguinera, the Vaia, the Dasdanè, the Racigande, the Berga and the Leprazzo.

The river provides a significant source for the production of hydropower.
