= Prezzo =

Frazione in Trentino-Alto Adige, Italy

- Interactive map of Prezzo
- Country: Italy
- Region: Trentino-Alto Adige/Südtirol
- Province: Trento
- Municipality: Pieve di Bono-Prezzo

Population (31 December 2015)
  - Total: 189
- Time zone: CET

Prezzo (Preč in the local dialect, German: Pretz) is a frazione of the commune of Pieve di Bono-Prezzo, in the Province of Trento (Trentino), northern Italy, located about 40 kilometres (25 mi) southwest of Trento.

== History ==
=== Recent history ===
Prezzo was an autonomous municipality until 7 March 1928, when it was suppressed and incorporated into the municipality of Pieve di Bono. Re-established on 6 September 1952, the municipality was again dissolved following a referendum held on 14 December 2014, in which the "yes" vote prevailed in Prezzo with 89.57% of the votes. On 1 January 2016 the municipality merged with Pieve di Bono into the scattered municipality (comune sparso) of Pieve di Bono-Prezzo.

=== Symbols ===
The coat of arms and banner were approved by provincial government resolution of 13 April 1990, no. 3910.

==== Coat of arms ====
Coat of arms tierced per fess and per pale: in the 1st azure, a stylized silver sanctuary, closed and ornamented proper; in the 2nd gules, a gold money bag surmounted by a balance scale of the same; in the 3rd argent, a trefoil proper. Crown: Municipal mural crown. Ornaments: On the right a laurel branch leaved proper with red fruit; on the left an oak branch leaved and acorned proper, tied by a knot of gold and black.

The coat of arms depicts the facade of the small Church of Madonna delle Grazie.

== Main sights ==
- Church of San Giacomo Maggiore
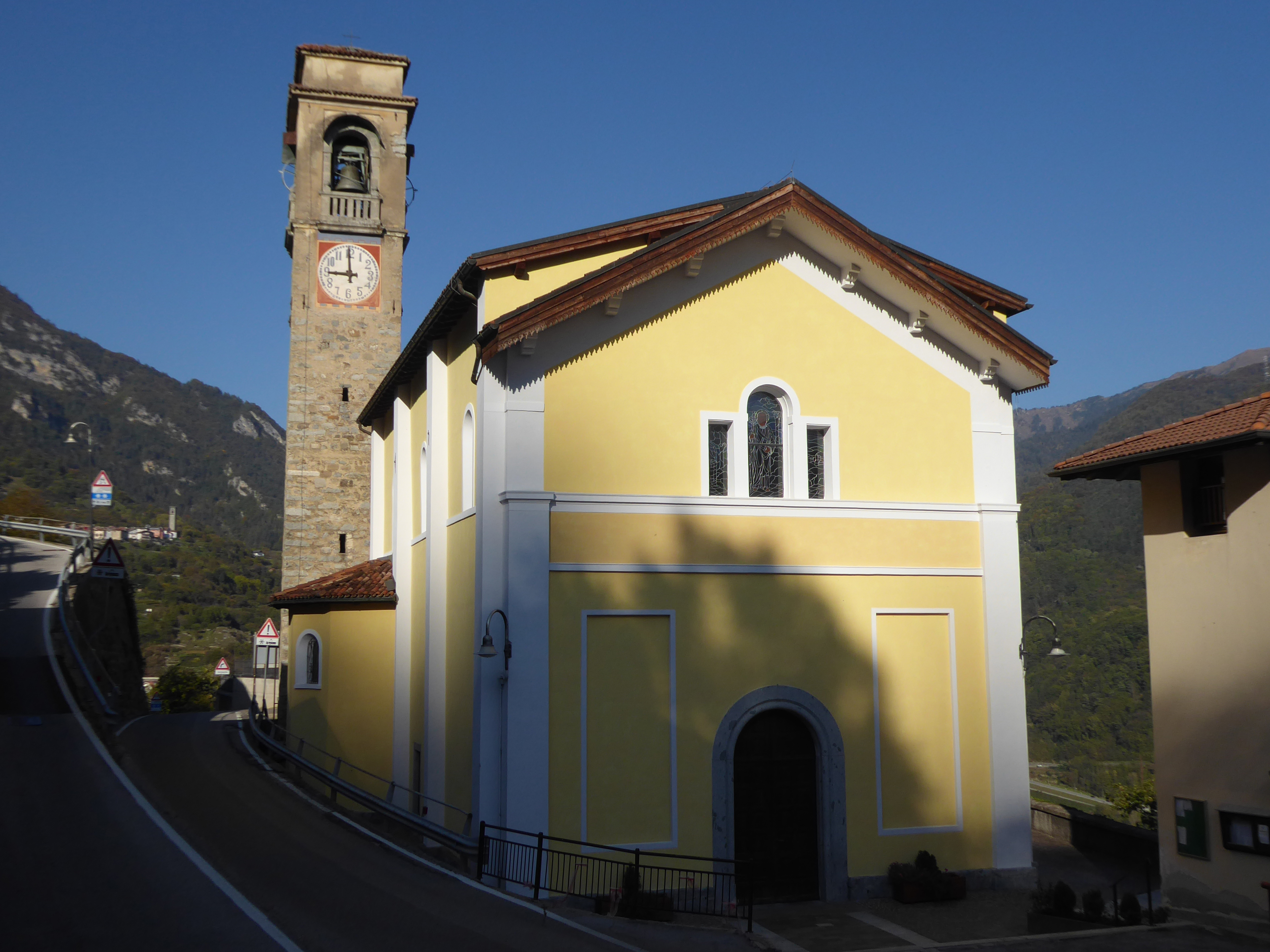
Church of San Giacomo Maggiore

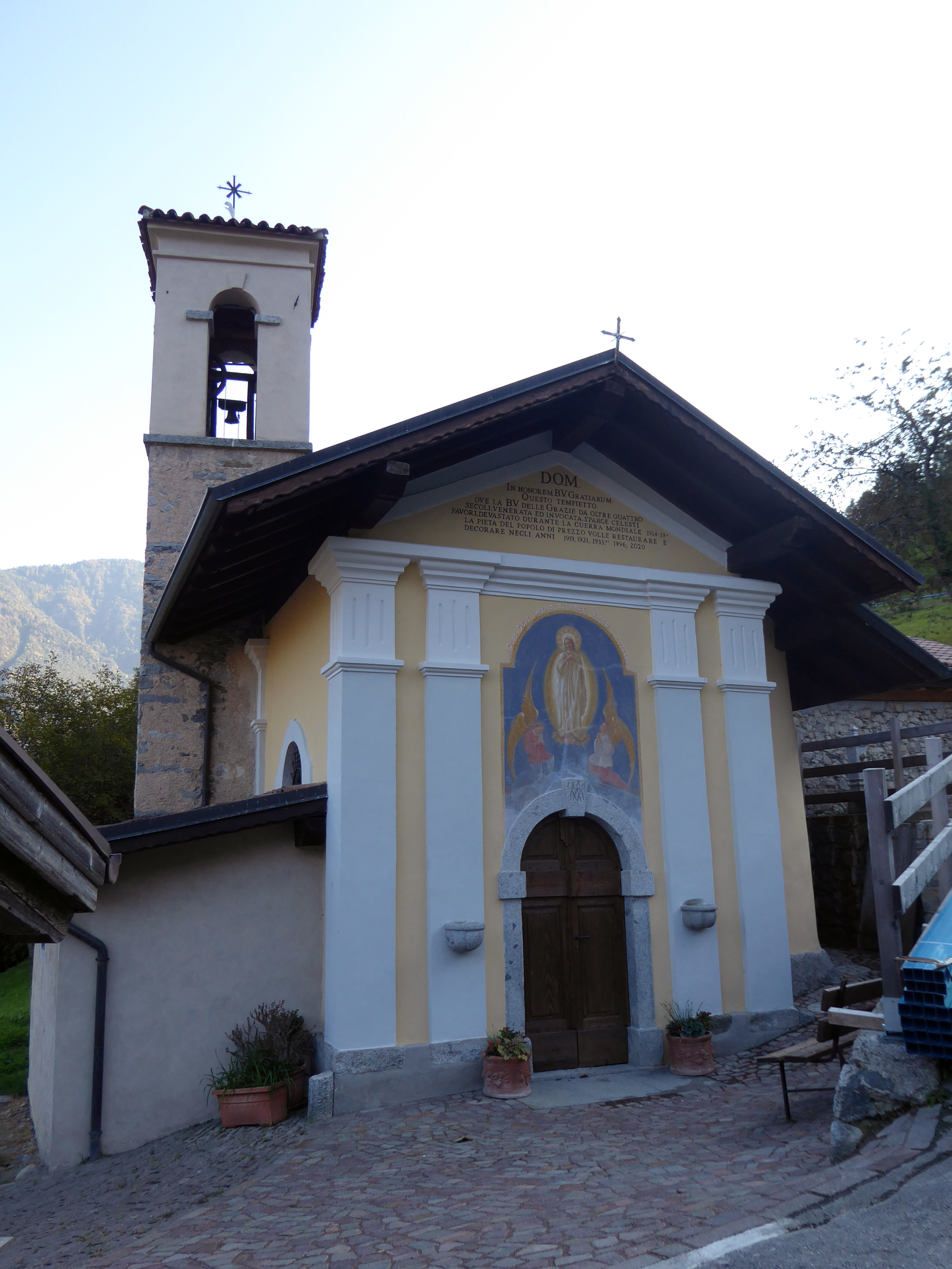
The little Church of Madonna delle Grazie

== Administration ==
Period		Office holder	Party	Title	Notes
1995	2000	Celestino Boldrini	Civic list	Mayor	
2000	2005	Ferdinando Baldracchi	Civic list	Mayor	
2005	2010	Celestino Boldrini	Civic list	Mayor	
2010	2015	Celestino Boldrini	Civic list	Mayor	

== See also ==
- Rifugio lupi di Toscana
