= Anfo =

- Comune
- Comune di Anfo
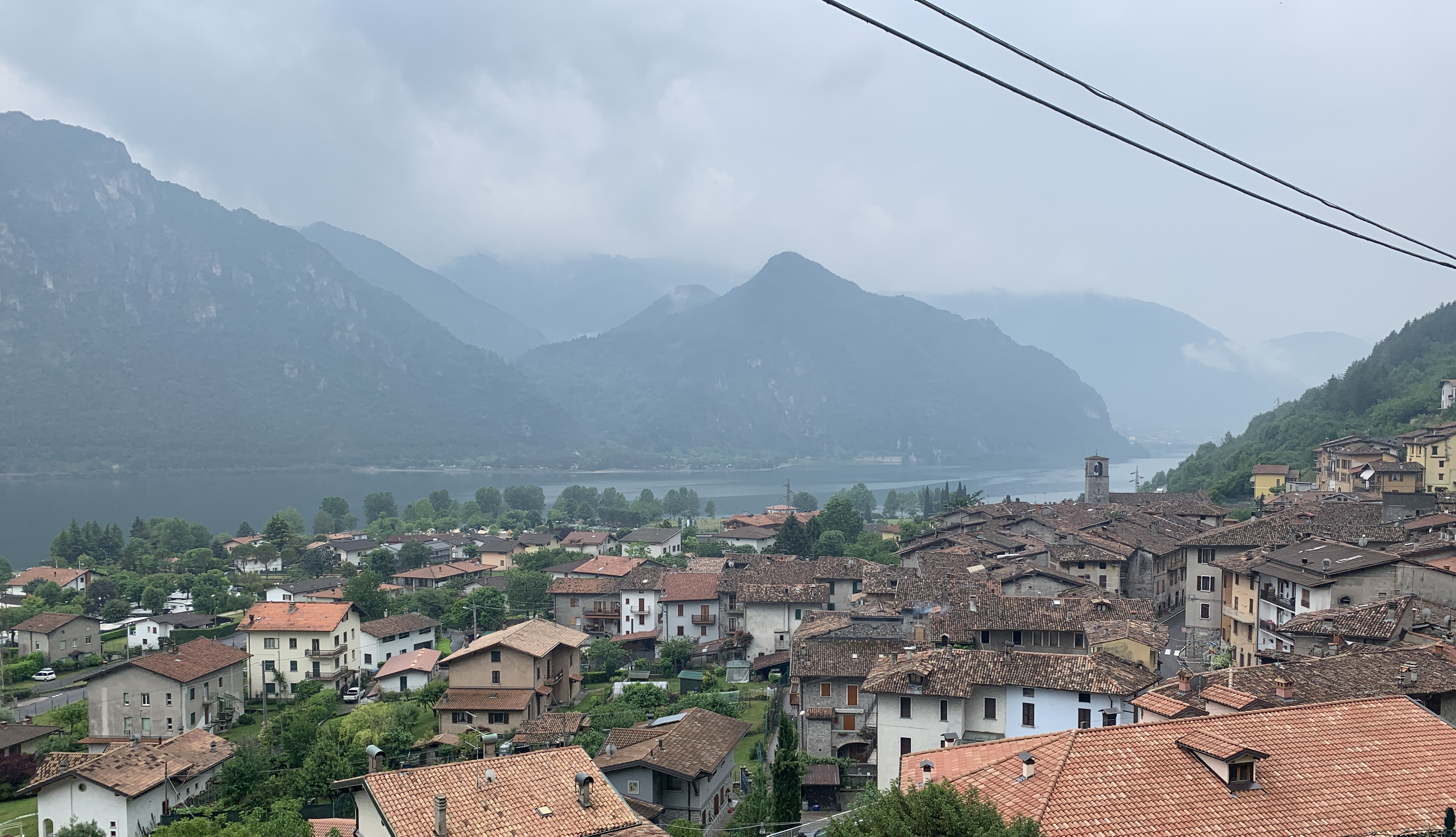
- View of Anfo

- Coat of arms

- Location of Anfo in Italy Anfo (Lombardy)
- Coordinates: 45°45′55″N 10°29′40″E
- Country: Italy
- Region: Lombardy
- Province: Brescia (BS)

Government
  - Mayor: Umberto Bondoni

Area
  - Total: 23.83 km^{2} (9.20 sq mi)
- Elevation: 400 m (1,300 ft)

Population (30 November 2017)
  - Total: 474
  - Density: 19.9/km^{2} (51.5/sq mi)
- Demonym: Anfesi
- Time zone: UTC+1 (CET)
  - Summer (DST): UTC+2 (CEST)
- Postal code: 25070
- Dialing code: 0365
- Patron saint: Sts. Peter and Paul
- Saint day: 29 June
- Website: Official website

Anfo (Brescian: Anf; Latin: Damphus) is a comune in the province of Brescia in northern Italy, roughly halfway between Milan and Venice. It is in the Lombardy region near Lake Idro and is bounded by other communes of Bagolino and Collio.

Rocca d'Anfo, a fortress, is located in it.
