= Brione, Trentino =

Brione
- Comune
- Comune di Brione
- Location within Italy Location within Trentino-Alto Adige/Südtirol
- Coordinates: 45°54′N 10°35′E
- Country: Italy
- Region: Trentino-Alto Adige/Südtirol
- Province: Trentino

Area
  - Total: 9 km^{2} (3.5 sq mi)

Population (2011)
  - Total: 126
  - Density: 14/km^{2} (36/sq mi)
- Time zone: UTC+1 (CET)
  - Summer (DST): UTC+2 (CEST)
- Postal code: 38003
- Website: Official website

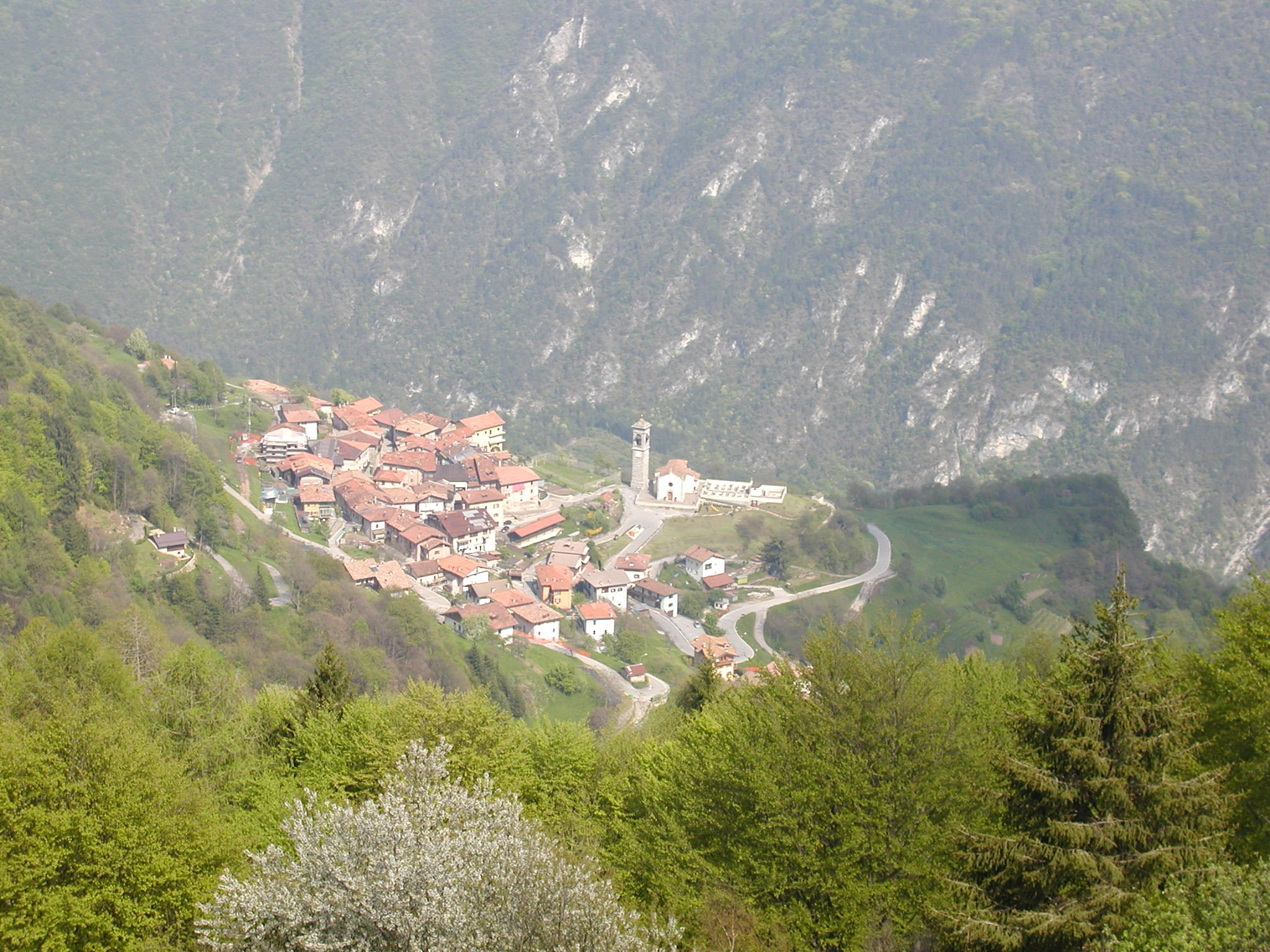
Aerial view of Brione

Brione (German: Breon, in local dialect: Briü) is a former comune, now a frazione of Borgo Chiese in Trentino, northern Italy.
