= Lake Idro =

Lake in Italy

- Lago d'Idro (Italian)
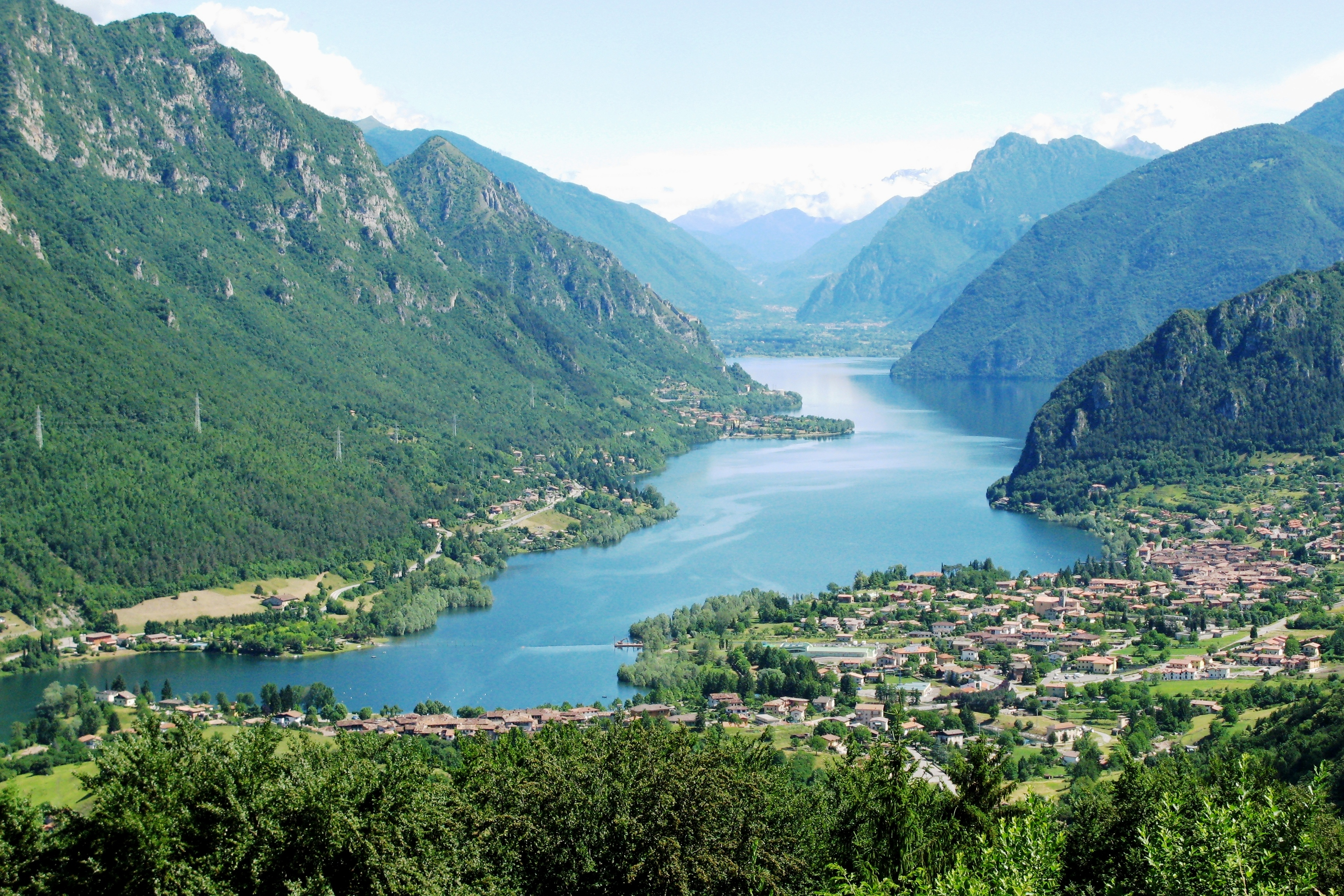

- Location within Lombardy
- Location: Province of Brescia and Trentino, Northern Italy
- Coordinates: 45°46′48″N 10°30′36″E
- Primary inflows: Chiese, Caffaro, Re di Anfo
- Primary outflows: Chiese
- Catchment area: 617 km^{2} (238 sq mi)
- Basin countries: Italy
- Max. length: 11 km (6.8 mi)
- Max. width: 1.9 km (1.2 mi)
- Surface area: 11.4 km^{2} (4.4 sq mi)
- Max. depth: 122 m (400 ft)
- Water volume: 335 hm^{3} (272,000 acre⋅ft)
- Shore length^{1}: 24 km (15 mi)
- Surface elevation: 368 m (1,207 ft)
- Settlements: Bondone, Idro, Anfo, Bagolino
- ^{1} Shore length is not a well-defined measure.

Lake Idro (Italian: Lago d'Idro, also Eridio from Latin: Eridius lacus, Lombard: Lac d'Ider, German: Idrosee) is an Italian prealpine lake of glacial origin situated largely within the Province of Brescia (Lombardy) and in part in Trentino.

At 368 metres (1,207 ft) above sea level it is the highest of the Lombard prealpine lakes. The lake is fed principally by the waters of the river Chiese; that river is also its only emissary. It has a surface area of 11.4 square kilometres (4.4 sq mi) and a maximum depth of 122 metres (400 ft).

The lake is surrounded by wooded mountains. The shoreline of some 24 kilometres (15 mi) is shared across four communes: Idro (the frazioni Crone and Lemprato), from which the lake takes its name, Anfo, Bagolino (fraz. Ponte Caffaro) and Bondone (fraz. Baitoni).

Lake Idro currently has become a site of conflict between environmental, agricultural and electricity industry interests.

The name derives from a legendary monster (Idra) who supposedly lived there.

== Gallery ==
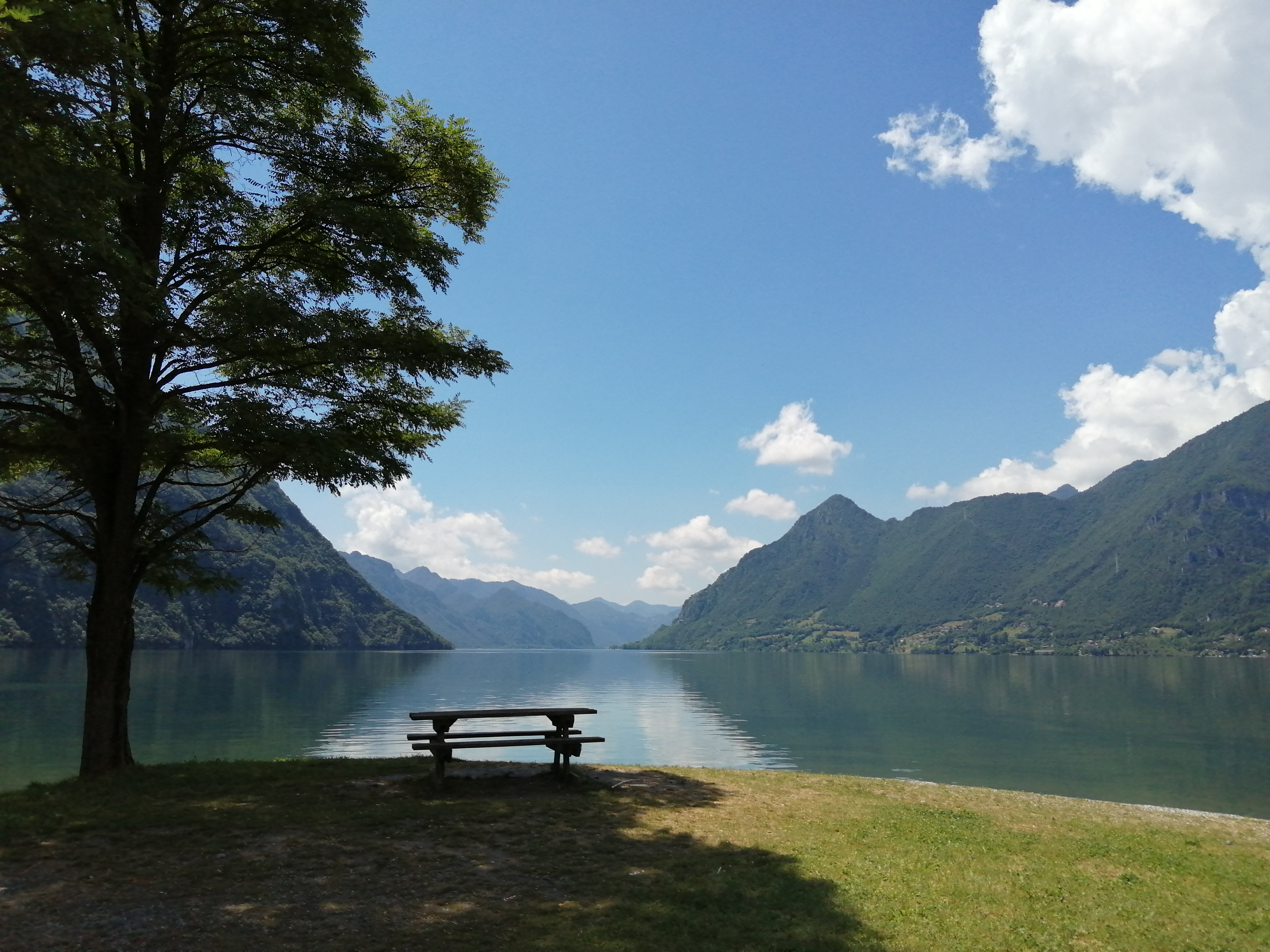
Baitoni

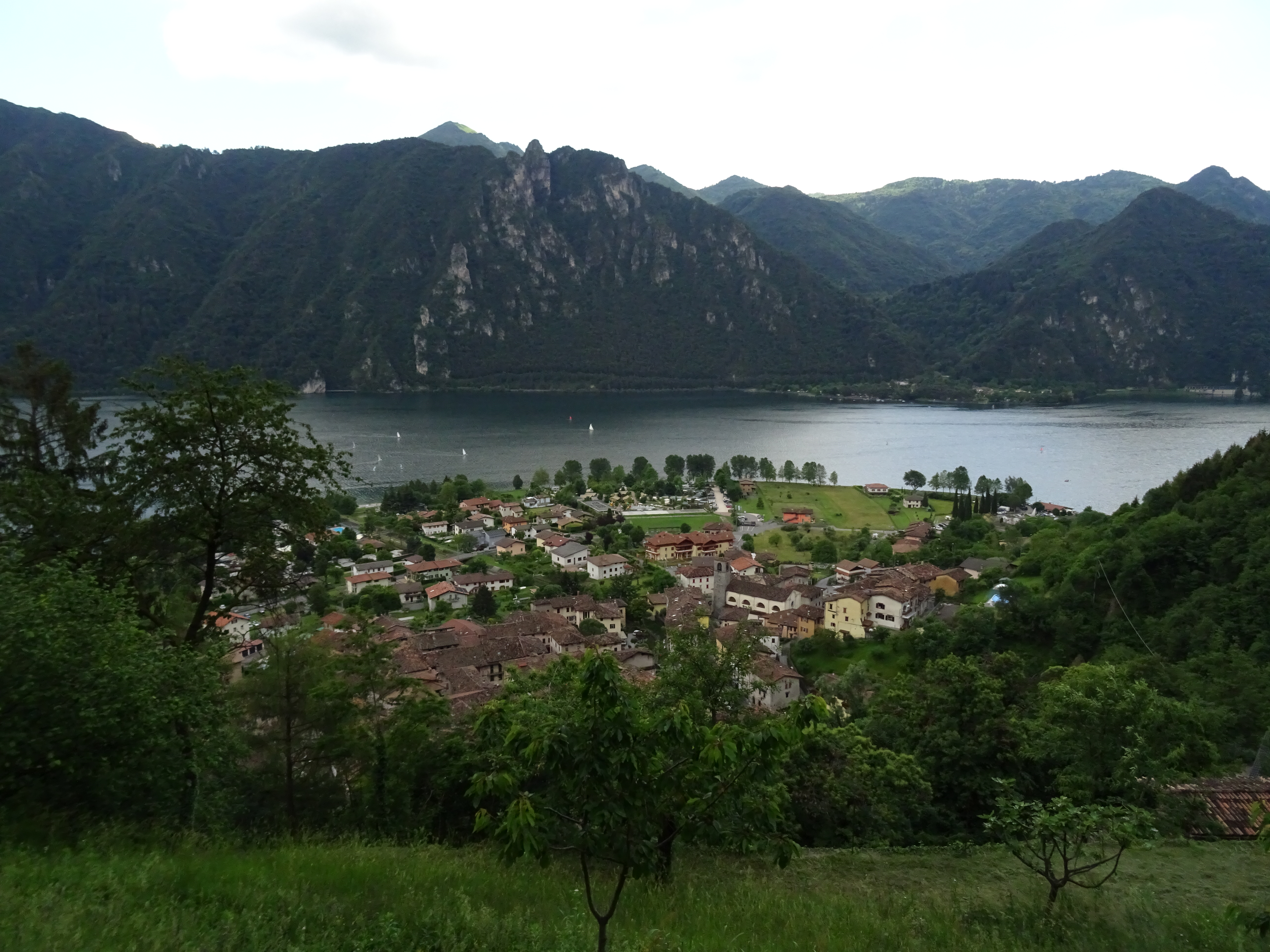
Anfo

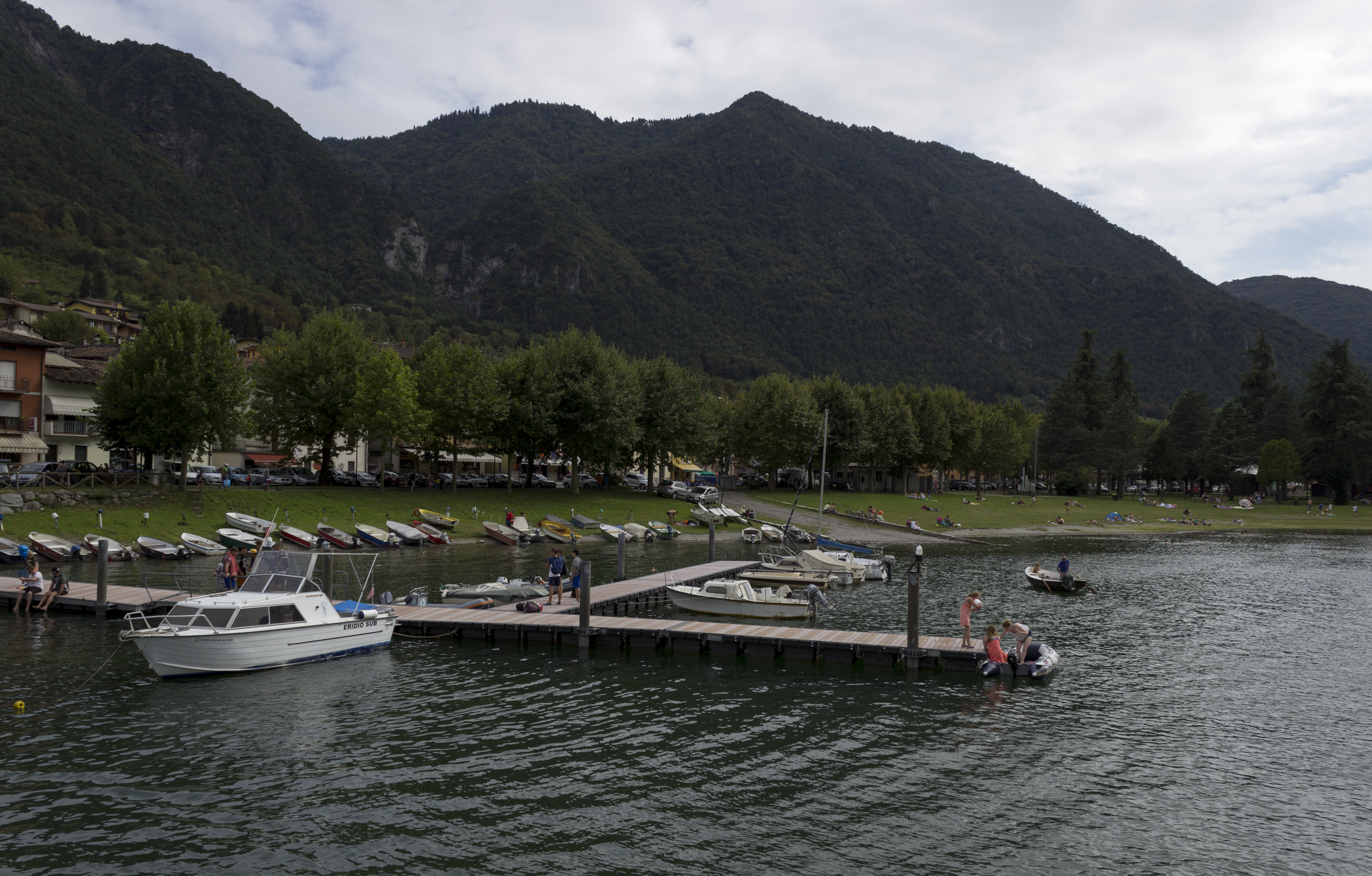
Crone

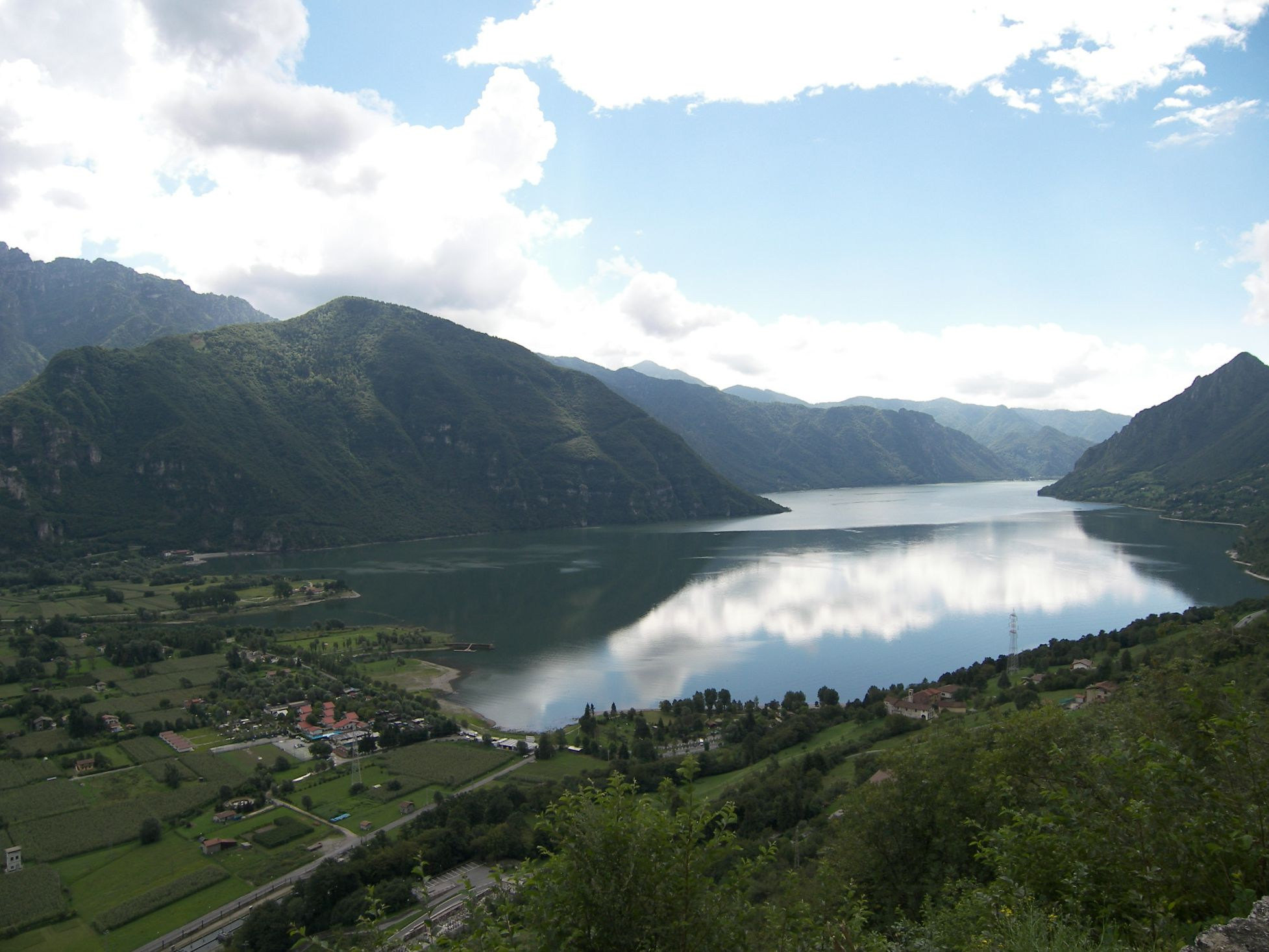
Ponte Caffaro

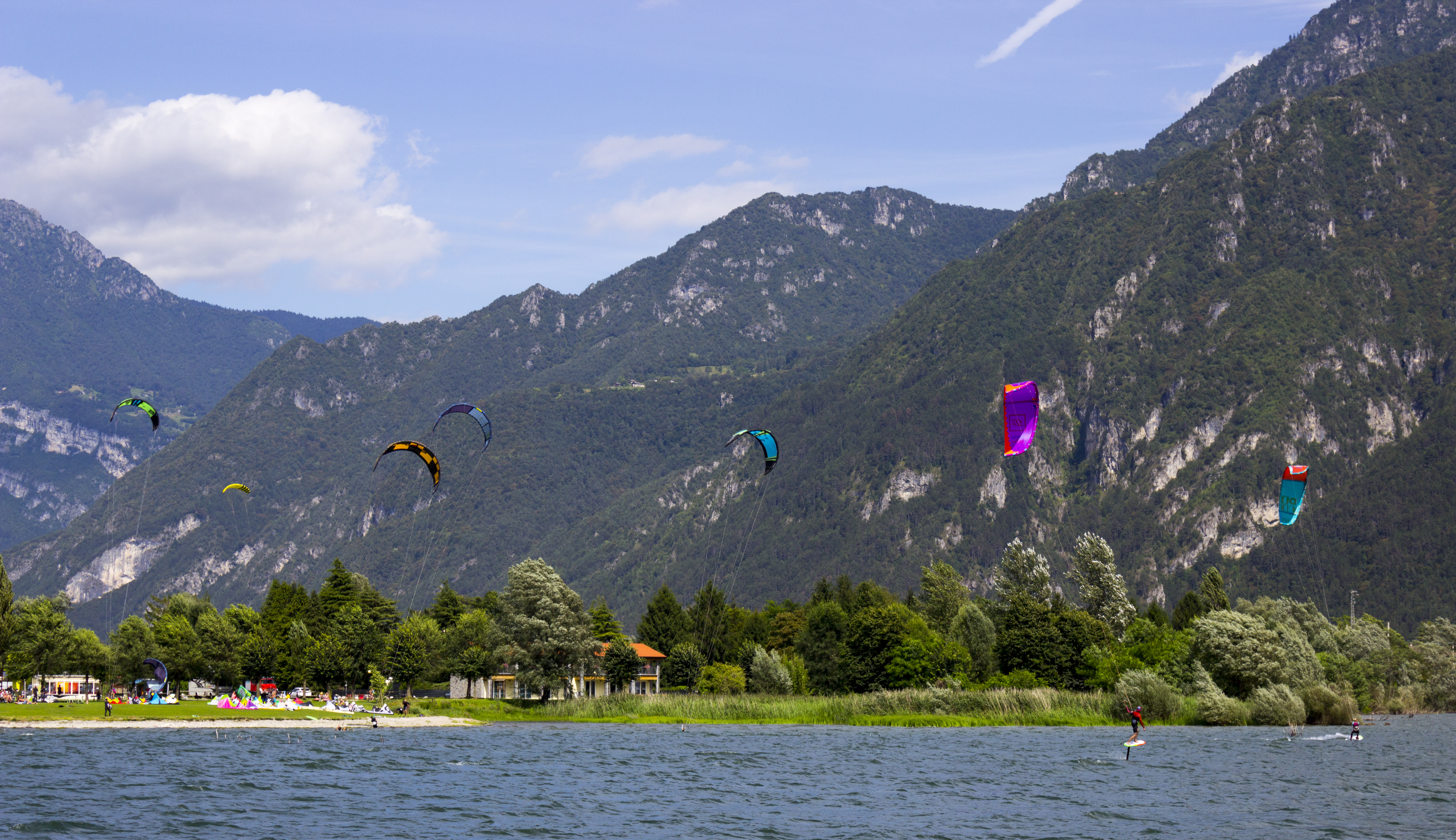
Kiteboarding during summer

== See also ==
- Italian Lakes
- List of lakes of Italy
