= Pieve di Bono =

Italian municipality

Pieve di Bono (German: Bauner Pleif) is a frazione of the commune of Pieve di Bono-Prezzo, in the Trentino-Alto Adige/Südtirol, northern Italy, located about 40 kilometres (25 mi) southwest of Trento.
