= Fusion of municipalities of Italy =

The fusion of Italian municipalities (Italian: fusione di comuni) is the physical-territorial union between two or more contiguous comuni.

The following list contains only the municipalities that are within the present-day borders of Italy.

== Fusion of municipalities from the Unification of Italy ==
Note: in bold the provincial capitals

=== Fusion of municipalities between 1861 and 1946 ===
Year of establishment (-Year of abolition)	Region	Province	New comune	Former comuni	Notes
1862	Lazio	Latina	Formia	Castellone; Maranola; Mola di Gaeta	
1870-1877	Lombardy	Lodi	Chiosi d'Adda Vigadore	Chiosi di Porta d'Adda; Vigadore	
1870	Lombardy	Milan	Marcallo con Casone	Casone; Marcallo	
1870	Lombardy	Milan	Robecchetto con Induno	Induno Ticino; Robecchetto	
1873	Tuscany	Arezzo	Ortignano Raggiolo	Ortignano; Raggiolo	
1874-1877	Lombardy	Lodi	Chiosi Uniti con Bottedo	Chiosi di Porta Regale; Chiosi di Porta Cremonese; Bottedo	
1920-1923	Lombardy	Milan	Gorlaprecotto	Gorla Primo; Precotto	
1920-2018	Trentino-Alto Adige/Südtirol	Trento	Pozza di Fassa	Pozza di Fassa; Pera di Fassa	
1923	Liguria	Imperia	**Imperia**	Oneglia; Porto Maurizio; Caramagna Ligure; Piani; Castelvecchio di Santa Maria Maggiore; Borgo Sant'Agata; Costa d’Oneglia; Poggi; Torrazza; Moltedo Superiore; Montegrazie	
1927	Apulia	Bari	Adelfia	Canneto di Bari; Montrone	
1927-1947	Lombardy	Bergamo	Curdomo	Curno; Mozzo	
1927	Lombardy	Bergamo	Valbondione	Bondione; Fiumenero	
1927-1945	Calabria	Cosenza	Guardia Piemontese Terme	Acquappesa; Guardia Piemontese	
1927	Lombardy	Lecco	Esino Lario	Esino Inferiore; Esino Superiore	
1927	Liguria	Savona	Finale Ligure	Finalborgo; Finalmarina; Finalpia	
1928	Trentino-Alto Adige/Südtirol	Trento	Spiazzo	Borzago; Mortaso; Fisto	
1928	Piedmont	Alessandria	Carezzano	Carezzano Superiore; Carezzano Inferiore	
1928-1946	Aosta Valley	Aosta	Gressoney	Gressoney-La-Trinité; Gressoney-Saint-Jean	
1928-1947	Lombardy	Cremona	Palvareto	Solarolo Rainerio; San Giovanni in Croce	
1928	Lombardy	Milan	Cinisello Balsamo	Cinisello; Balsamo	
1928-1946	Campania	Naples	Albanova	Casal di Principe; San Cipriano d'Aversa	
1928-1946	Campania	Naples	Arienzo San Felice	Arienzo; San Felice a Cancello	
1928	Calabria	Reggio Calabria	Taurianova	Jatrinoli; Radicena; Terranova	
1928	Piedmont	Turin	Campiglione-Fenile	Campiglione; Fenile	
1928	Friuli-Venezia Giulia	Trieste	Duino-Aurisina	Aurisina; Duino; Malchina; San Pelagio; Slivia	
1928-1966	Lombardy	Como	Cernusco Montevecchia	Cernusco Lombardone; Montevecchia	
1928-1970	Lombardy	Bergamo	Riviera d'Adda	Medolago; Solza	
1929-1946	Campania	Naples	Fertilia	Casaluce; Teverola	
1936-1947	Lombardy	Pavia	Pometo	Canevino; Ruino	
1938-1946	Tuscany	Massa-Carrara	**Apuania**	Carrara; **Massa**; Montignoso	
1939-1945	Sicily	Catania	Giarre-Riposto	Giarre; Riposto	
1939	Piedmont	Verbania	**Verbania**	Intra; Pallanza	
1940-1945	Lazio	Rome	Nettunia	Anzio; Nettuno	

=== Fusion of municipalities since 1946 ===
Year of establishment (-Year of abolition)	Region	Province	New comune	Former comuni	Notes
1968	Calabria	Catanzaro	Lamezia Terme	Nicastro; Sambiase; Sant'Eufemia Lamezia	
1995	Veneto	Rovigo	Porto Viro	Contarina; Donada	
1995	Veneto	Padua	Due Carrare	Carrara San Giorgio; Carrara Santo Stefano	
1998	Piedmont	Asti	Montiglio Monferrato	Colcavagno; Montiglio; Scandeluzza	
1999-2019	Piedmont	Biella	Mosso	Mosso Santa Maria; Pistolesa	
2003	Lombardy	Como	San Siro	Sant'Abbondio; Santa Maria Rezzonico	
2009	Friuli-Venezia Giulia	Udine	Campolongo Tapogliano	Campolongo al Torre; Tapogliano	
2010	Trentino-Alto Adige/Südtirol	Trento	Comano Terme	Bleggio Inferiore; Lomaso	
2010	Trentino-Alto Adige/Südtirol	Trento	Ledro	Bezzecca; Concei; Molina di Ledro; Pieve di Ledro; Tiarno di Sopra; Tiarno di Sotto	
2011	Lombardy	Como	Gravedona ed Uniti	Consiglio di Rumo; Germasino; Gravedona	
2013	Campania	Avellino	Montoro	Montoro Inferiore; Montoro Superiore	
2013	Veneto	Belluno	Quero Vas	Quero; Vas	
2014	Emilia-Romagna	Bologna	Valsamoggia	Bazzano; Castello di Serravalle; Crespellano; Monteveglio; Savigno	
2014	Emilia-Romagna	Ferrara	Fiscaglia	Massa Fiscaglia; Migliarino; Migliaro	
2014	Emilia-Romagna	Parma	Sissa Trecasali	Sissa; Trecasali	
2014	Emilia-Romagna	Rimini	Poggio Torriana	Poggio Berni; Torriana	
2014	Friuli-Venezia Giulia	Udine	Rivignano Teor	Rivignano; Teor	
2014	Lombardy	Bergamo	Sant'Omobono Terme	Sant'Omobono Terme; Valsecca	
2014	Lombardy	Bergamo	Val Brembilla	Brembilla; Gerosa	
2014	Lombardy	Como	Bellagio	Bellagio; Civenna	
2014	Lombardy	Como	Colverde	Drezzo; Gironico; Parè	
2014	Lombardy	Como	Tremezzina	Lenno; Mezzegra; Ossuccio; Tremezzo	
2014	Lombardy	Lecco	Verderio	Verderio Inferiore; Verderio Superiore	
2014	Lombardy	Mantua	Borgo Virgilio	Borgoforte; Virgilio	
2014	Lombardy	Pavia	Cornale e Bastida	Bastida de' Dossi; Cornale	
2014	Lombardy	Varese	Maccagno con Pino e Veddasca	Maccagno; Pino sulla Sponda del Lago Maggiore; Veddasca	
2014	Marche	Ancona	Trecastelli	Castel Colonna; Monterado; Ripe	
2014	Marche	Pesaro e Urbino	Vallefoglia	Colbordolo; Sant'Angelo in Lizzola	
2014	Tuscany	Arezzo	Castelfranco Piandiscò	Castelfranco di Sopra; Pian di Scò	
2014	Tuscany	Arezzo	Pratovecchio Stia	Pratovecchio; Stia	
2014	Tuscany	Firenze	Figline e Incisa Valdarno	Figline Valdarno; Incisa in Val d'Arno	
2014	Tuscany	Firenze	Scarperia e San Piero	San Piero a Sieve; Scarperia	
2014	Tuscany	Lucca	Fabbriche di Vergemoli	Fabbriche di Vallico; Vergemoli	
2014	Tuscany	Pisa	Casciana Terme Lari	Casciana Terme; Lari	
2014	Tuscany	Pisa	Crespina Lorenzana	Crespina; Lorenzana	
2014	Veneto	Belluno	Longarone	Castellavazzo; Longarone	
2015	Friuli-Venezia Giulia	Pordenone	Valvasone Arzene	Arzene; Valvasone	
2015	Lombardy	Lecco	La Valletta Brianza	Perego; Rovagnate	
2015	Lombardy	Sondrio	Gordona	Gordona; Menarola	
2015	Tuscany	Lucca	Sillano Giuncugnano	Giuncugnano; Sillano	
2015	Trentino-Alto Adige/Südtirol	Trento	Predaia	Coredo; Smarano; Taio; Tres; Vervò	
2015	Trentino-Alto Adige/Südtirol	Trento	San Lorenzo Dorsino	Dorsino; San Lorenzo in Banale	
2015	Trentino-Alto Adige/Südtirol	Trento	Valdaone	Bersone; Daone; Praso	
2016	Emilia-Romagna	Bologna	Alto Reno Terme	Granaglione; Porretta Terme	
2016	Emilia-Romagna	Parma	Polesine Zibello	Polesine Parmense; Zibello	
2016	Emilia-Romagna	Reggio Emilia	Ventasso	Busana; Collagna; Ligonchio; Ramiseto	
2016	Emilia-Romagna	Rimini	Montescudo-Monte Colombo	Monte Colombo; Montescudo	
2016	Lombardy	Brescia	Bienno	Bienno; Prestine	
2016	Lombardy	Pavia	Corteolona e Genzone	Corteolona; Genzone	
2016	Piedmont	Biella	Campiglia Cervo	Campiglia Cervo; Quittengo; San Paolo Cervo	
2016	Piedmont	Biella	Lessona	Crosa; Lessona	
2016	Piedmont	Verbania	Borgomezzavalle	Seppiana; Viganella	
2016	Trentino-Alto Adige/Südtirol	Trento	Altavalle	Faver; Grauno; Grumes; Valda	
2016	Trentino-Alto Adige/Südtirol	Trento	Altopiano della Vigolana	Bosentino; Centa San Nicolò; Vattaro; Vigolo Vattaro	
2016	Trentino-Alto Adige/Südtirol	Trento	Amblar-Don	Amblar; Don	
2016	Trentino-Alto Adige/Südtirol	Trento	Borgo Chiese	Brione; Cimego; Condino	
2016	Trentino-Alto Adige/Südtirol	Trento	Borgo Lares	Bolbeno; Zuclo	
2016	Trentino-Alto Adige/Südtirol	Trento	Castel Ivano	Spera; Strigno; Villa Agnedo	
2016	Trentino-Alto Adige/Südtirol	Trento	Castel Ivano	Castel Ivano; Ivano-Fracena	
2016	Trentino-Alto Adige/Südtirol	Trento	Cembra Lisignago	Cembra; Lisignago	
2016	Trentino-Alto Adige/Südtirol	Trento	Contà	Cunevo; Flavon; Terres	
2016	Trentino-Alto Adige/Südtirol	Trento	Dimaro Folgarida	Dimaro; Monclassico	
2016	Trentino-Alto Adige/Südtirol	Trento	Madruzzo	Calavino; Lasino	
2016	Trentino-Alto Adige/Südtirol	Trento	Pieve di Bono-Prezzo	Pieve di Bono; Prezzo	
2016	Trentino-Alto Adige/Südtirol	Trento	Porte di Rendena	Darè; Vigo Rendena; Villa Rendena	
2016	Trentino-Alto Adige/Südtirol	Trento	Primiero San Martino di Castrozza	Fiera di Primiero; Siror; Tonadico; Transacqua	
2016	Trentino-Alto Adige/Südtirol	Trento	Sella Giudicarie	Bondo; Breguzzo; Lardaro; Roncone	
2016	Trentino-Alto Adige/Südtirol	Trento	Tre Ville	Montagne; Preore; Ragoli	
2016	Trentino-Alto Adige/Südtirol	Trento	Vallelaghi	Padergnone; Terlago; Vezzano	
2016	Trentino-Alto Adige/Südtirol	Trento	Ville d'Anaunia	Nanno; Tassullo; Tuenno	
2016	Veneto	Belluno	Alpago	Farra d'Alpago; Pieve d'Alpago; Puos d'Alpago	
2016	Veneto	Belluno	Val di Zoldo	Forno di Zoldo; Zoldo Alto	
2017	Calabria	Cosenza	Casali del Manco	Casole Bruzio; Pedace; Serra Pedace; Spezzano Piccolo; Trenta	
2017	Emilia-Romagna	Ferrara	Terre del Reno	Mirabello; Sant'Agostino	
2017	Lombardy	Como	Alta Valle Intelvi	Lanzo d'Intelvi; Pellio Intelvi; Ramponio Verna	
2017	Lombardy	Como	San Fermo della Battaglia	Cavallasca; San Fermo della Battaglia	
2017	Lombardy	Mantua	Sermide e Felonica	Felonica; Sermide	
2017	Marche	Macerata	Fiastra	Acquacanina; Fiastra	
2017	Marche	Macerata	Valfornace	Fiordimonte; Pievebovigliana	
2017	Marche	Pesaro e Urbino	Colli al Metauro	Montemaggiore al Metauro; Saltara; Serrungarina	
2017	Marche	Pesaro e Urbino	Terre Roveresche	Barchi; Orciano di Pesaro; Piagge; San Giorgio di Pesaro	
2017	Piedmont	Biella	Pettinengo	Pettinengo; Selve Marcone	
2017	Tuscany	Pistoia	Abetone Cutigliano	Abetone; Cutigliano	
2017	Tuscany	Pistoia	San Marcello Piteglio	Piteglio; San Marcello Pistoiese	
2017	Tuscany	Siena	Montalcino	Montalcino; San Giovanni d'Asso	
2017	Veneto	Vicenza	Val Liona	Grancona; San Germano dei Berici	
2018	Calabria	Cosenza	Corigliano-Rossano	Corigliano Calabro; Rossano	
2018	Emilia-Romagna	Piacenza	Alta Val Tidone	Caminata; Nibbiano; Pecorara	
2018	Friuli-Venezia Giulia	Udine	Fiumicello Villa Vicentina	Fiumicello; Villa Vicentina	
2018	Friuli-Venezia Giulia	Udine	Treppo Ligosullo	Ligosullo; Treppo Carnico	
2018	Liguria	Imperia	Montalto Carpasio	Carpasio; Montalto Ligure	
2018	Lombardy	Como	Centro Valle Intelvi	Casasco d'Intelvi; Castiglione d'Intelvi; San Fedele Intelvi	
2018	Lombardy	Lecco	Valvarrone	Introzzo; Tremenico; Vestreno	
2018	Lombardy	Lodi	Castelgerundo	Camairago; Cavacurta	
2018	Lombardy	Mantua	Borgo Mantovano	Pieve di Coriano; Revere; Villa Poma	
2018	Piedmont	Alessandria	Alluvioni Piovera	Alluvioni Cambiò; Piovera	
2018	Piedmont	Alessandria	Cassano Spinola	Cassano Spinola; Gavazzana	
2018	Piedmont	Vercelli	Alto Sermenza	Rima San Giuseppe; Rimasco	
2018	Piedmont	Vercelli	Cellio con Breia	Breia; Cellio	
2018	Piedmont	Vercelli	Varallo	Sabbia; Varallo	
2018	Tuscany	Arezzo	Laterina Pergine Valdarno	Laterina; Pergine Valdarno	
2018	Tuscany	Livorno	Rio	Rio Marina; Rio nell'Elba	
2018	Trentino-Alto Adige/Südtirol	Trento	San Giovanni di Fassa	Pozza di Fassa; Vigo di Fassa	
2018	Veneto	Padua	Borgo Veneto	Megliadino San Fidenzio; Saletto; Santa Margherita d'Adige	
2018	Veneto	Vicenza	Barbarano Mossano	Barbarano Vicentino; Mossano	
2019	Apulia	Lecce	Presicce-Acquarica	Presicce; Acquarica del Capo	
2019	Emilia-Romagna	Ferrara	Riva del Po	Berra; Ro	
2019	Emilia-Romagna	Ferrara	Tresignana	Formignana; Tresigallo	
2019	Emilia-Romagna	Parma	Sorbolo Mezzani	Mezzani; Sorbolo	
2019	Lombardy	Como	Solbiate con Cagno	Cagno; Solbiate	
2019	Lombardy	Cremona	Piadena Drizzona	Drizzona; Piadena	
2019	Lombardy	Cremona	Torre de' Picenardi	Ca' d'Andrea; Torre de' Picenardi	
2019	Lombardy	Milan	Vermezzo con Zelo	Vermezzo; Zelo Surrigone	
2019	Lombardy	Mantua	Borgocarbonara	Borgofranco sul Po; Carbonara di Po	
2019	Lombardy	Mantua	San Giorgio Bigarello	Bigarello; San Giorgio di Mantova	
2019	Lombardy	Pavia	Colli Verdi	Canevino; Ruino; Valverde	
2019	Lombardy	Varese	Cadrezzate con Osmate	Cadrezzate; Osmate	
2019	Marche	Pesaro e Urbino	Sassocorvaro Auditore	Auditore; Sassocorvaro	
2019	Piedmont	Alessandria	Lu e Cuccaro Monferrato	Lu; Cuccaro Monferrato	
2019	Piedmont	Biella	Quaregna Cerreto	Cerreto Castello; Quaregna	
2019	Piedmont	Biella	Valdilana	Mosso; Soprana; Trivero; Valle Mosso	
2019	Piedmont	Cuneo	Busca	Busca; Valmala	
2019	Piedmont	Cuneo	Saluzzo	Castellar; Saluzzo	
2019	Piedmont	Cuneo	Santo Stefano Belbo	Camo; Santo Stefano Belbo	
2019	Piedmont	Novara	Gattico-Veruno	Gattico; Veruno	
2019	Piedmont	Turin	Val di Chy	Alice Superiore; Lugnacco; Pecco	
2019	Piedmont	Turin	Valchiusa	Meugliano; Trausella; Vico Canavese	
2019	Piedmont	Verbania	Valle Cannobina	Cavaglio-Spoccia; Cursolo-Orasso; Falmenta	
2019	Piedmont	Vercelli	Alagna Valsesia	Alagna Valsesia; Riva Valdobbia	
2019	Tuscany	Florence	Barberino Tavarnelle	Barberino Val d'Elsa; Tavarnelle Val di Pesa	
2019	Trentino-Alto Adige/Südtirol	Trento	Terre d'Adige	Nave San Rocco; Zambana	
2019	Veneto	Belluno	Borgo Valbelluna	Lentiai; Mel; Trichiana	
2019	Veneto	Treviso	Pieve del Grappa	Crespano del Grappa; Paderno del Grappa	
2019	Veneto	Vicenza	Colceresa	Mason Vicentino; Molvena	
2019	Veneto	Vicenza	Lusiana Conco	Conco; Lusiana	
2019	Veneto	Vicenza	Valbrenta	Campolongo sul Brenta; Cismon del Grappa; San Nazario; Valstagna	
2020	Lombardy	Lecco	Bellano	Bellano; Vendrogno	
2020	Trentino-Alto Adige/Südtirol	Trento	Borgo d'Anaunia	Castelfondo; Fondo; Malosco	
2020	Trentino-Alto Adige/Südtirol	Trento	Novella	Cagnò; Revò; Romallo; Brez; Cloz	
2020	Trentino-Alto Adige/Südtirol	Trento	San Michele all'Adige	San Michele all'Adige; Faedo	
2020	Trentino-Alto Adige/Südtirol	Trento	Ville di Fiemme	Carano; Daiano; Varena	
2023	Lombardy	Varese	Bardello con Malgesso e Bregano	Bardello; Bregano; Malgesso	
2023	Piedmont	Asti	Moransengo-Tonengo	Moransengo; Tonengo	

== Upcoming fusions (already approved) ==
1º January 2027

- Nuova Pescara (PE) (Montesilvano, Pescara and Spoltore) - Population 193.697
