= Mel, Veneto =

Mel
- Comune
- Comune di Mel
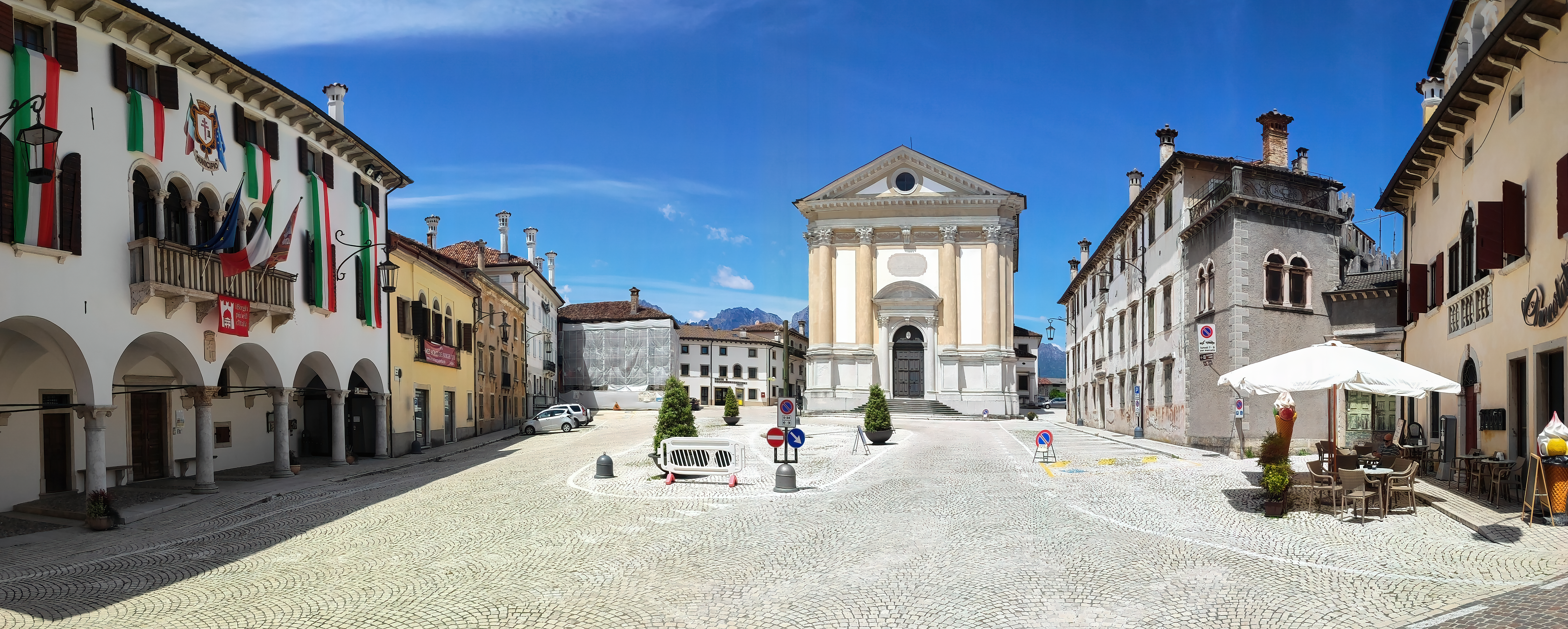
- Center of Mel with Town hall and church

- Location within Italy Location within Veneto
- Coordinates: 46°4′N 12°5′E
- Country: Italy
- Region: Veneto
- Province: Belluno (BL)
- Frazioni: Bardies, Campo, Campo San Pietro, Carve, Carve Montagna, Col, Conzago, Cordellon, Corte, Farra, Follo, Gus, Marcador, Nave, Pagogna, Pellegai, Samprogno, San Candido, Signa, Tallandino, Tiago, Torta, Tremea, Valmaor, Vanie-Rive di Villa, Villa di Villa, Zottier

Government
  - Mayor: Stefano Cesa

Area
  - Total: 85.7 km^{2} (33.1 sq mi)
- Elevation: 362 m (1,188 ft)

Population (31 December 2017)
  - Total: 5,968
  - Density: 69.6/km^{2} (180/sq mi)
- Demonym: Zumellesi
- Time zone: UTC+1 (CET)
  - Summer (DST): UTC+2 (CEST)
- Postal code: 32026
- Dialing code: 0437
- Website: Official website

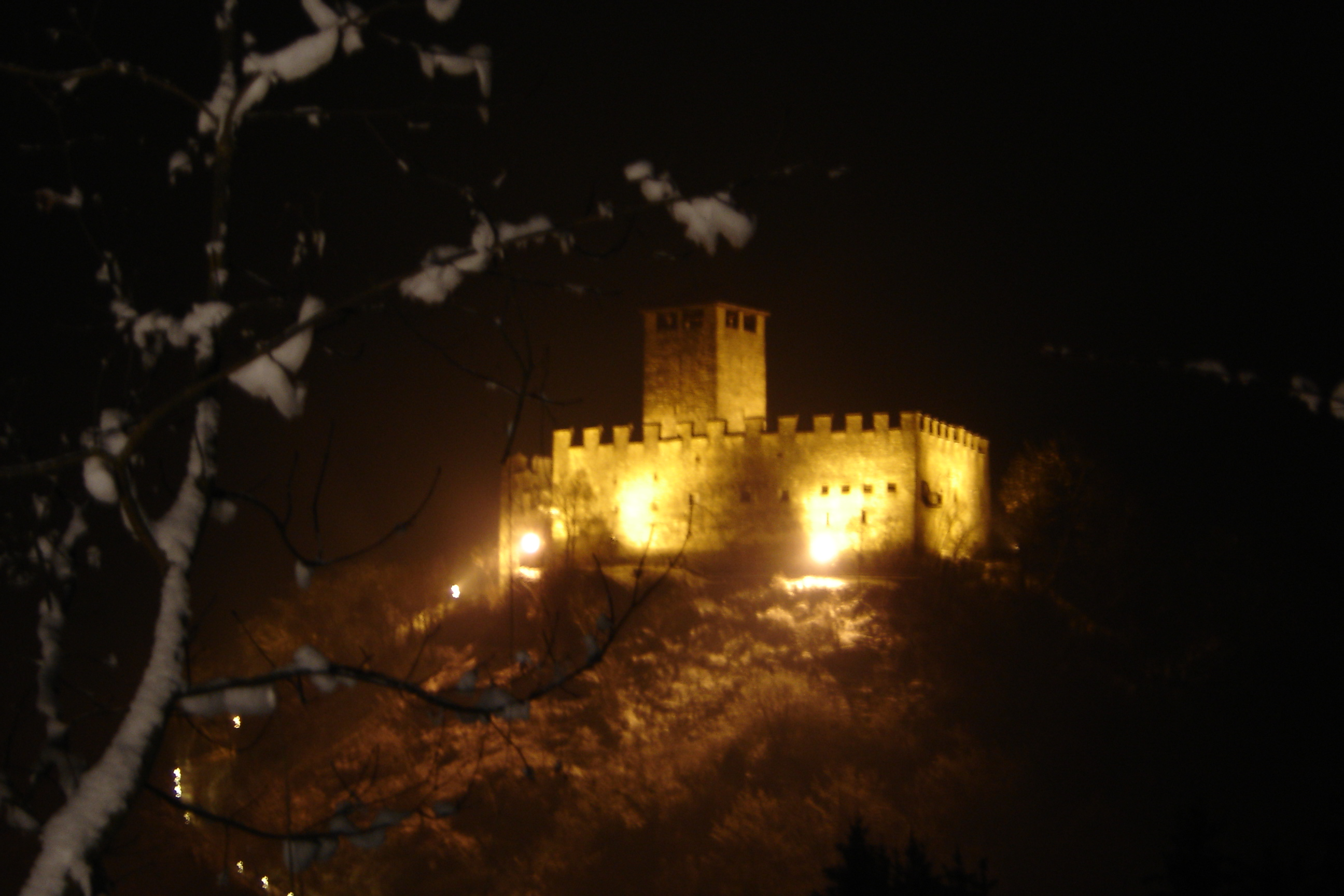
Castle of Zumelle

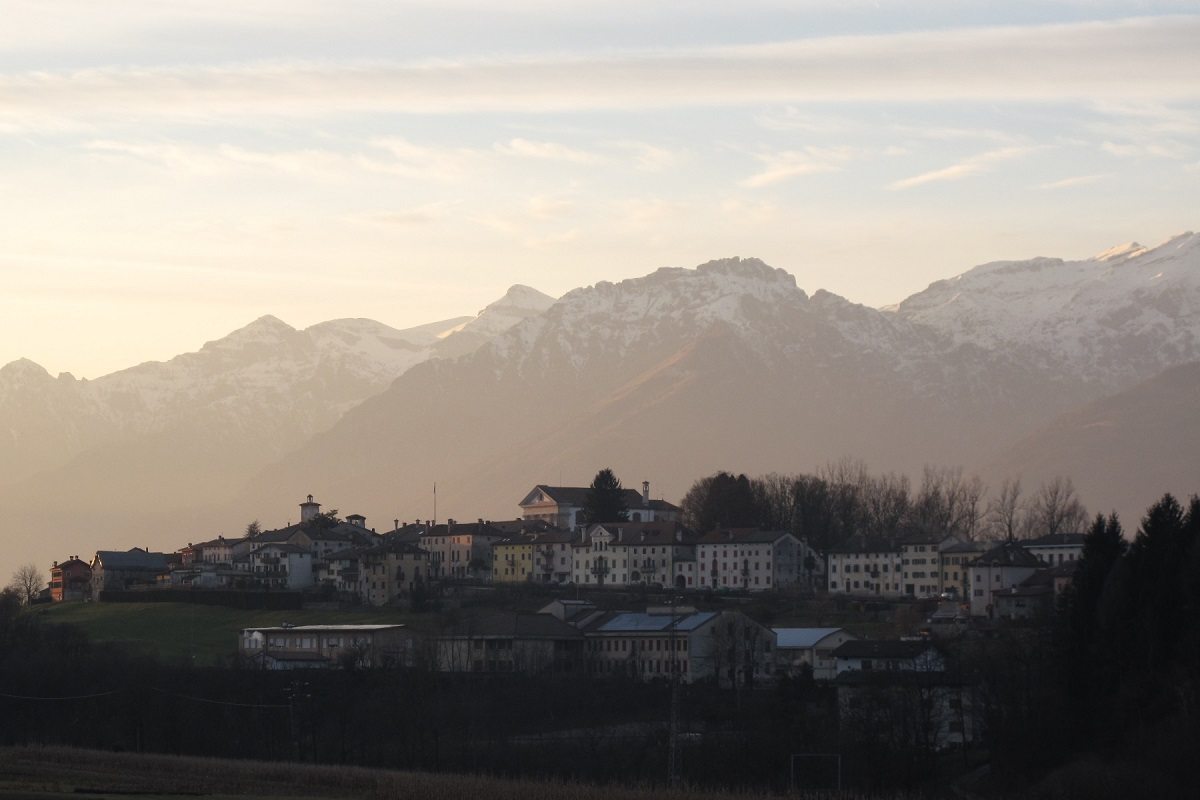
Mel and surrounding mountains

Mel was a comune (municipality) in the province of Belluno in the Italian region of Veneto, located about 170 kilometres (106 miles) north of Venice and about 14 kilometres (9 miles) southwest of Belluno and about 16 kilometres (10 miles) northeast of Feltre. It merged with the municipalities of Trichiana and Lentiai on 30 January 2019 to form the comune of Borgo Valbelluna. It is one of I Borghi più belli d'Italia ("The most beautiful villages of Italy").

== Overview ==
The territory of Mel is home to the medieval Zumelle Castle. The present configuration of the castle dates back to 1311, although the site was in use as a military fortification since the Roman era. Other sights include the Palazzo Zorzi (16th century, now the Town Hall) and the Palazzo delle Contesse (17th century), which houses an archaeological museum with remains from a Veneti Iron Age necropolis found outside the town.

The town is home to several cultural activities: they include art exhibitions in Palazzo delle Contesse and the choral music festival in July in the Guarnieri palace park.
