= Patrick Schaff =

French serial killer

- Born: Patrick Joseph Max Schaff; 1966; Mulhouse, Grand Est, France
- Died: March 25, 2022 (aged 56); Vico Canavese, Piedmont, Italy
- Other names: "The House of Horrors Killer" "The Mercenary"
- Convictions: Murder; Concealment of a corpse
- Penalty: 26 years and 3 months (murder); 2 years (concealment of a corpse)

Details
- Victims: 3
- Span of crimes: 1995–2005
- Country: Italy
- States: Piedmont, Tuscany
- Date apprehended: June 18, 1996

Patrick Joseph Max Schaff (1966 – March 25, 2022), known as The House of Horrors Killer (Italian: L'assassino della casa degli orrori), was a French serial killer who murdered and dismembered two homeless women in Italy's Piedmont region in 1995. Convicted of one murder and sentenced to 26 years imprisonment, he killed a cellmate in 2005 and was interned at a psychiatric facility.

In 2007, he wrote a letter to the prosecutor confessing to all three crimes, but as he was already interned at a mental facility, he was never charged. He died in 2022, after being struck by a sudden illness.

== Early life and move to Italy ==
Patrick Joseph Max Schaff was born in Mulhouse, France in 1966. He was abandoned at birth by his parents and grew up in an orphanage, and when he reached the age of majority, he was convinced by an acquaintance to join the French Army. His activities during this period are poorly documented, with Schaff claiming that he was stationed in Lebanon and Laos, where he claimed to have carried out contract killings, but these claims could not be verified. He later worked as an excavation director in Saudi Arabia and in Libya, before returning to France in the late 1980s, becoming a permanent resident of Poitiers.

Left without a job and stable income, Schaff became homeless and wandered the streets, making a living by begging and offering to paint portraits of women. In the early 1990s, he left France and began wandering around northern Italy, frequently staying in homeless shelters with other foreign nationals.

== "House of Horror" murders ==
During his travels, Schaff came across 44-year-old Ingrid Obermeier, a homeless woman from Germany. They decided to travel together through Liguria, the French Riviera and the Langhe, before ending up at an abandoned house in Cuneo. Between May 12 and 15, 1995, after a night of heavy drinking, Schaff hit Obermeier on the head with a wrench, killing her in the process. He then dismembered her remains and severed both of her breasts and placed them over her eyes, before ultimately burying her remains nearby. Before leaving the house, Schaff carved the words "Death room" on the door leading to the room where Obermeier's remains had been dismembered.

He then moved to the town of Ivrea, where he came across 42-year-old homeless woman Nadia Carlino. After spending some time with her, Schaff killed her sometime between late May and early June, severing her breasts, ripping out her abdomen and breaking her spine. Schaff buried most of the remains in a sand pit, with the body being discovered twenty days later by a cyclist who saw one of her breasts protruding through the sand.

== Manhunt and arrest ==
By the time Carlino's body was discovered, Schaff had already been labeled a person of interest by the authorities and was actively sought after. This was due to the fact that a knife and cap found near the victim's body were identified as belonging to Schaff by two fellow unhoused people. He had previously been detained and questioned by an investigator, but as there no sufficient evidence for an arrest at the time, the investigator had no choice but to let him go. Authorities also specified that there was a possibility that Carlino's death may have been the result of an accidental overdose, as a large quantity of phenobarbitals was found in her system.

While examining places he had been known to frequent, authorities came across Obermeier's decomposing remains, but initially were unable to identify her. While forensic tests were underway to identify the victim, they received information from various homeless people who claimed that they had encountered Schaff - when asked about his involvement in the crime, he claimed that he had witnessed three Moroccans killing the woman. As a result, members of the Reparto volanti detained three Moroccan citizens - 31-year-old Mohammed Gharib, 27-year-old Mohammed Charif and 26-year-old Said Darhou, all from Casablanca - and Gharib's Italian girlfriend, 27-year-old Fiorenza Cipolleta, on suspicion of committing the crime. When it was determined that they had nothing to do with the woman's murder, all four were released.

In the meantime, Schaff fled back to France, crossing the Alps on foot to avoid being captured by the border guard. He remained hidden until June 18, 1996, when he was traced to a friend's house in Terni and arrested for the murder of Obermeier, who by then had been identified. While he initially claimed to have only buried her body, Schaff eventually confessed to killing Obermeier and dismembering her remains, after which he was charged with her murder - in contrast to this, he had convinced the authorities that Carlino's death was accidental, and was only charged with concealment of a corpse in that case. In his confessions, Schaff told lurid details of how he had killed Obermeier, claiming that he had even exercised with makeshift gym equipment shortly after killing her.

=== Trial and prison murder ===
In November 1996, Schaff was put on trial for the concealment charges, found guilty and sentenced to two years imprisonment. The following month, Schaff was put on trial for Obermeier's murder, with her two children being flown over from their home in Germany to testify at the trial. He was eventually found guilty on all counts, but as a court-appointed psychiatrist found him to be suffering from a mental impairtment, Schaff was given 26 years imprisonment, followed by 3 years internment in a nursing home. He remained emotionless while the verdict was being read out.

After his conviction, Schaff was transferred to serve his sentence at a prison in Porto Azzurro. On August 23, 2005, he slit the throat of his cellmate, 47-year-old Alberico Somma, who had been incarcerated for killing his wife and 11-year-old son. Schaff then drew crosses and odd writings on the wall with his victim's blood in order to mislead the investigators, but in a subsequent interview, he confessed that he had killed Somma because he "talked too much and was disturbing [him]."

== Confessions and death ==
On April 12, 2007, Schaff sent a letter to judge Emanuela Gai - who had convicted of the concealment charge in 1996 - confessing that he had strangled Carlino to death and wanted to have the case properly closed.

After Somma's murder, Schaff was transferred to the Massa Prison, where he remained until 2021, when he was moved to a psychiatric facility in Vico Canavese so his severe form of diabetes could be treated. The director of the facility remarked that while he no longer posed a physical danger due to his frail state and did not bother the staff or fellow patients, Schaff still showed no real remorse for his crimes and seemingly enjoyed talking about them whenever a journalist or psychologist wanted to interview him.

On the night of March 25 to 26, Schaff was struck with a sudden illness and died in the facility's medical wing. As nobody wanted to claim his body, he was buried in a potter's field at the expense of the municipality.

== See also ==
- List of serial killers by country
