= Induno =

Induno may refer to:

- Domenico Induno, Italian painter
- Gerolamo Induno, Italian painter
- Induno Olona, town and comune in Italy, in north-western Lombardy in the Province of Varese
- Induno Ticino, village in the Metropolitan City of Milan in the Italian region Lombardy
