= Lago di Alice (Lake Alice) =

Glacial lake in Piedmont, Italy

Coordinates: 45°27′44″N 7°47′44″E

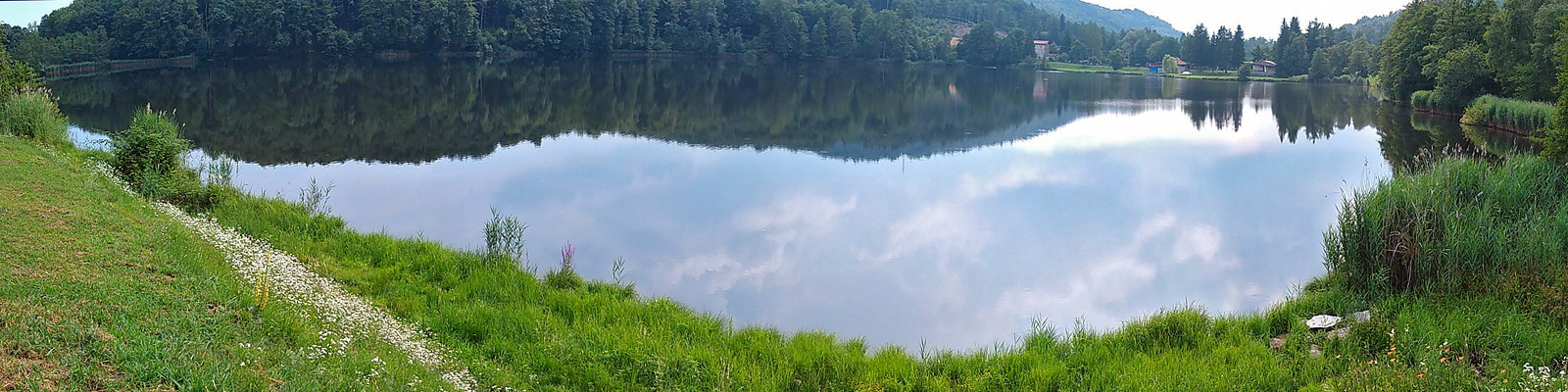
- Panoramic view of the lake from the north

- Location of Lago di Alice Lago di Alice (Italy)
- Location: Alice Superiore, Metropolitan City of Turin, Piedmont, Italy
- Type: Glacial lake

Lago di Alice is a moraine lake of glacial origin; it is located at 575 m above sea level in the municipality of Alice Superiore, in the Metropolitan City of Turin. West of the main body of water is a smaller lake called, precisely, Lago Piccolo.

== Morphology ==
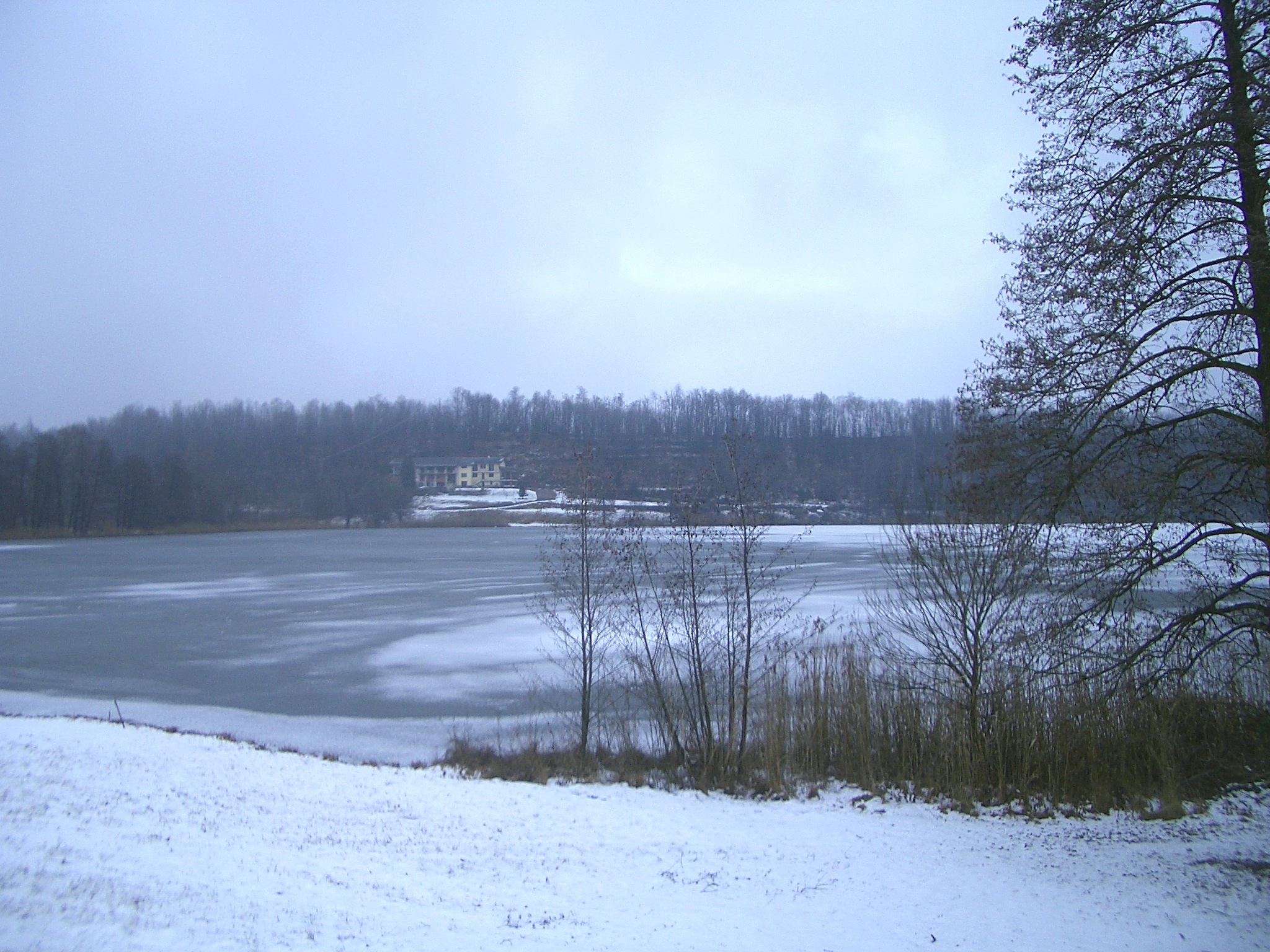
The lake in winter

The basin has an approximately square shape. To the south, it is bordered by the SP 68 road, while to the east, a large private beach provides access to the water. On the northern shore, a grassy valley extends towards the nearby Lake Meugliano, while the eastern shore is dominated by a moraine ridge covered with trees.

The Little Lake, over 100 meters long and about 80 meters wide, is characterized by low, marshy shores and a large reed bed.

In 2009, the "Lakes of Meugliano and Alice" were recognized as a Site of Community Importance (code: IT1110034).

== Hiking ==
The western part of the lake is crossed by the Holly Trail, while the Lake Trail runs between the southern shore and the provincial road, reaching the Little Lake. Near the two bodies of water also passes the High Route of the Ivrea Morainic Amphitheater.

== Fishing ==
The lake is a fishing reserve where, in winter, there are brown trout and Arctic char; rainbow trout can be fished even in summer thanks to the relatively cool water temperature.

== Nature protection ==
The lake is included in the Site of Community Importance Lakes of Meugliano and Alice (code IT1110034), established under Directive 92/43/EEC (Habitats Directive) and also designated as a Special Area of Conservation
