= Galliate =

- Comune
- Comune di Galliate
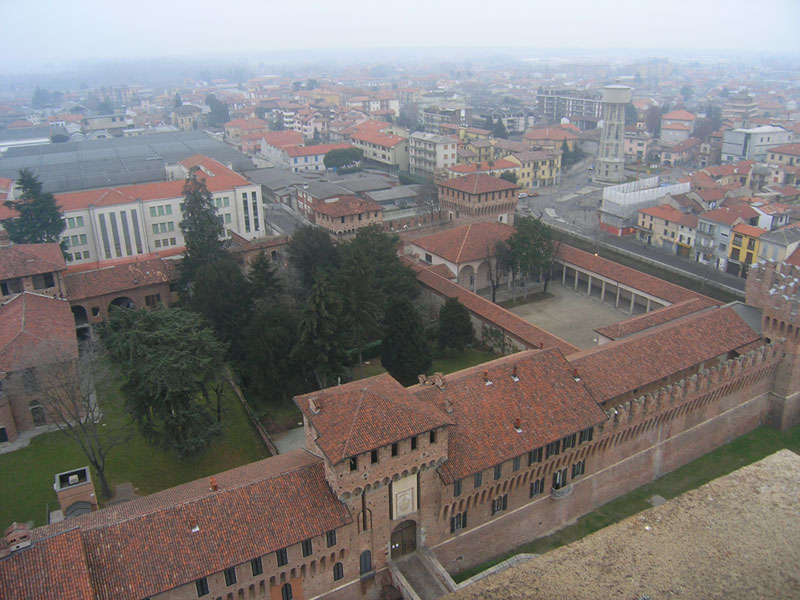
- View of Galliate with the castle.

- Coat of arms

- Location within Italy Location within Piedmont
- Coordinates: 45°29′N 8°42′E
- Country: Italy
- Region: Piedmont
- Province: Novara (NO)

Government
  - Mayor: Claudiano Di Caprio

Area
  - Total: 29.5 km^{2} (11.4 sq mi)
- Elevation: 54 m (177 ft)

Population (31 December 2015)
  - Total: 15,701
  - Density: 532/km^{2} (1,380/sq mi)
- Demonym: Galliatesi
- Time zone: UTC+1 (CET)
  - Summer (DST): UTC+2 (CEST)
- Postal code: 28066
- Dialing code: 0321
- Website: Official website

Galliate is a comune (municipality) in the Province of Novara in the Italian region Piedmont, located about 90 kilometres (56 mi) northeast of Turin, about 40 kilometres (25 mi) northwest Milan and about 7 kilometres (4 mi) northeast of Novara.

Galliate borders the following municipalities: Cameri, Novara, Romentino, Cuggiono, Bernate Ticino, Robecchetto con Induno, Turbigo. It is home to a late-15th-century castle built under the Sforza family of Milan, and to the 16th-century sanctuary of Varallino, designed by Pellegrino Tibaldi.

The commune's territory is included in the Ticino River Natural Park.

== Notable Galliatesi ==
- Achille Varzi (1904–1948), Grand Prix motor racing champion.
- Massimo Maccarone (born 1979), Italian international footballer.
