= Turbigo =

Turbigo Torbigh (Lombard)
- Comune
- Comune di Turbigo
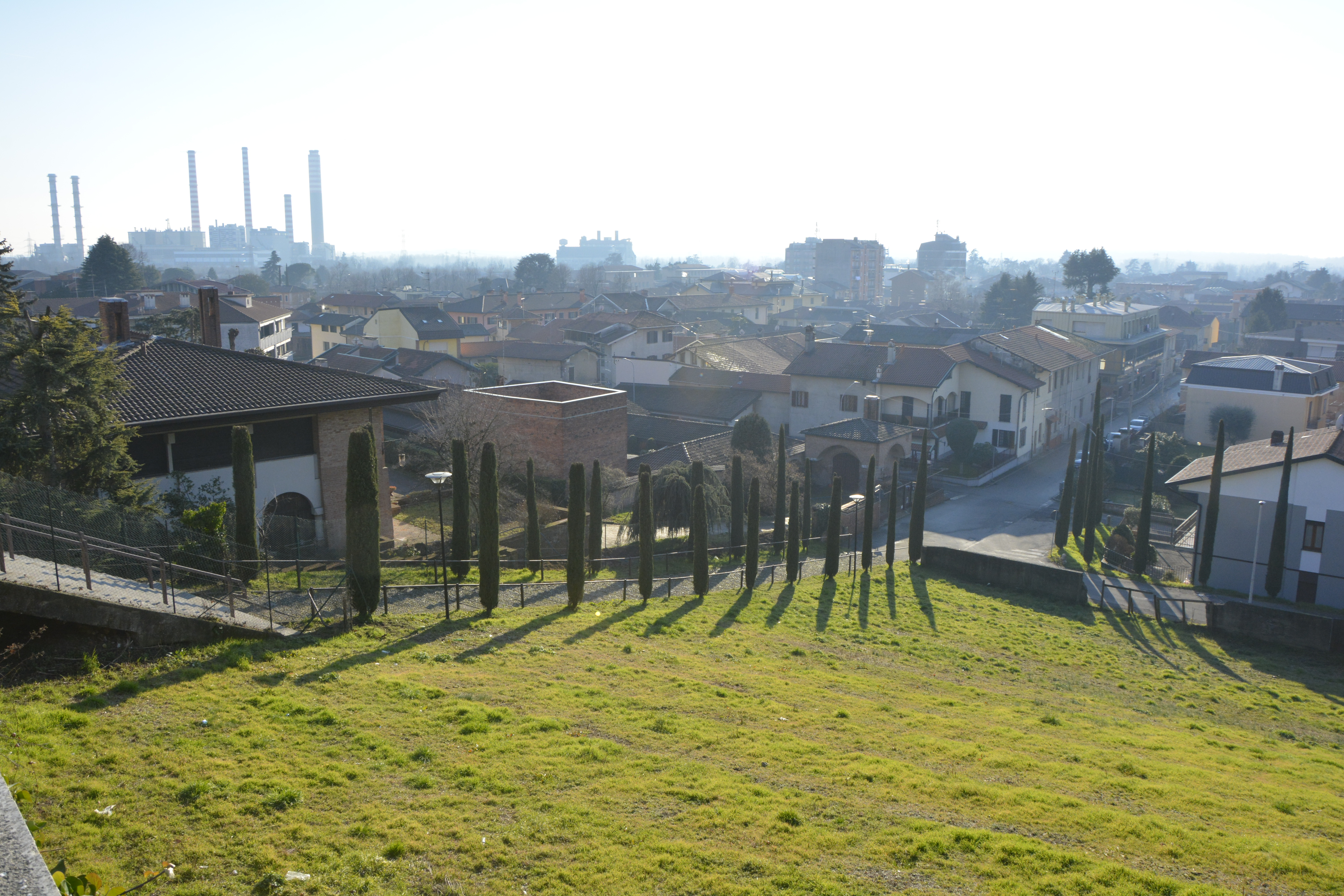

- Coat of arms

- Location within Italy Location within Lombardy
- Coordinates: 45°32′N 8°44′E
- Country: Italy
- Region: Lombardy
- Metropolitan city: Milan (MI)

Government
  - Mayor: Laura Mira Bonomi

Area
  - Total: 8.5 km^{2} (3.3 sq mi)
- Elevation: 146 m (479 ft)

Population (31 December 2007)
  - Total: 7,413
  - Density: 870/km^{2} (2,300/sq mi)
- Demonym: Turbighesi
- Time zone: UTC+1 (CET)
  - Summer (DST): UTC+2 (CEST)
- Postal code: 20029
- Dialing code: 0331

Turbigo (Milanese: Torbigh [turˈbiːk]) is a comune (municipality) in the Province of Milan in the Italian region Lombardy, located about 35 kilometres (22 mi) west of Milan, along the Naviglio Grande canal. As of 31 December 2004, it had a population of 7,486 and an area of 8.5 square kilometres (3.3 mi^{2}).

Turbigo borders the following municipalities: Castano Primo, Cameri, Robecchetto con Induno, Galliate. It is the birthplace of naturalist Giuseppe Gené.

It is home to a medieval castle, known from the 9th century and perhaps built around a Roman tower, and to church of Santi Cosma e Damiano (1639–40). Also from the 17th century is a bridge over the Naviglio Grande.

On 3 June 1859, Turbigo was the site of the Battle of Turbigo, a battle of the Second Italian War of Independence. Franco-Piedmontese troops crossed the Ticino via a pontoon bridge to occupy the town. The battle is commemorated in the name of rue de Turbigo, a Paris street near Temple.

Turbigo is a member of Cittaslow.

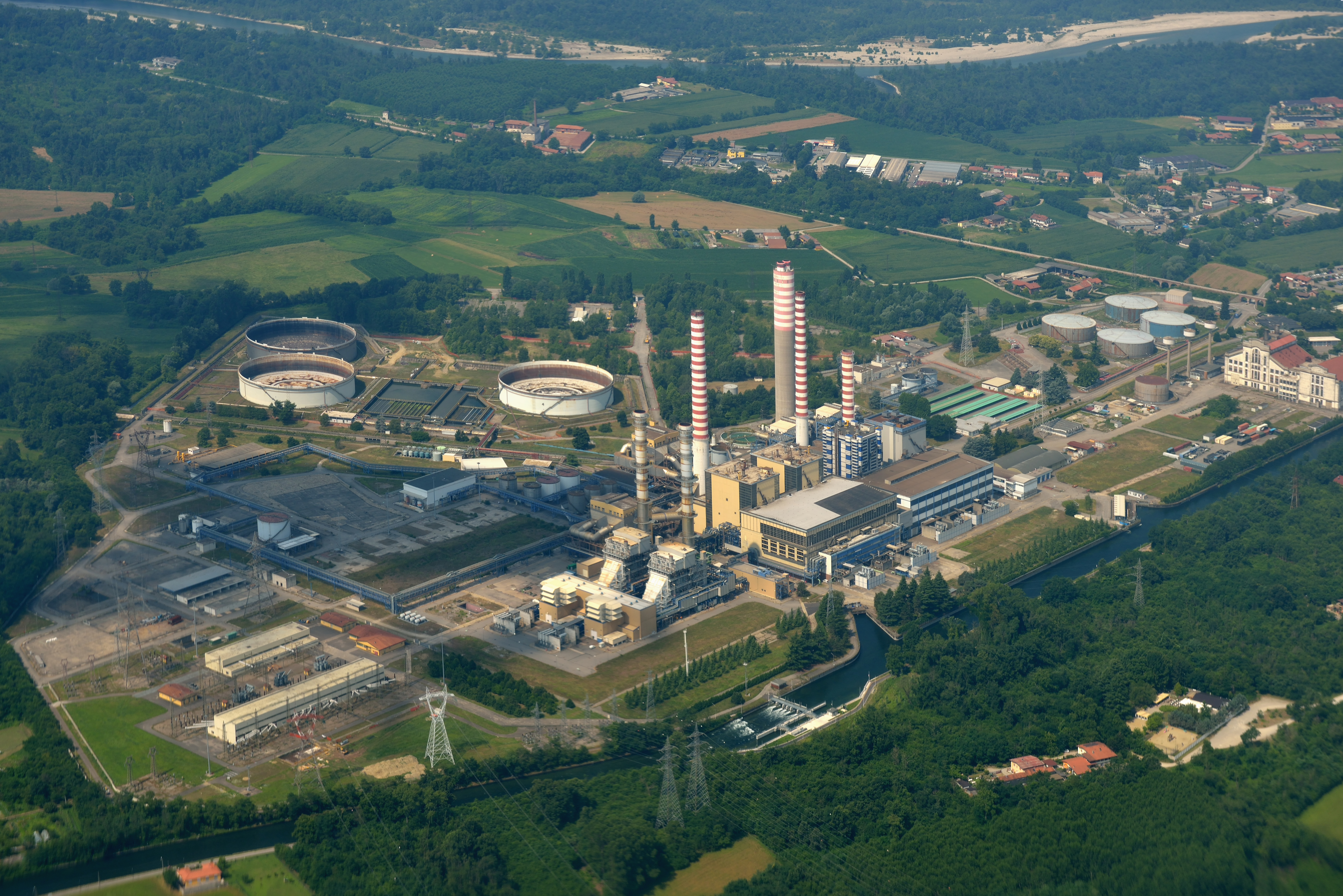
The thermal power station Turbigo
