= Guecellone II da Camino =

Italian noble

Guecellone II da Camino (born Guecellone da Montanara; died 1187) was an Italian medieval noble and military leader, belonging to the Da Camino family.

The son of Gabriele I and Adeleta di Porcia, he became one of the most powerful men in the March of Treviso after the marriage to Sofia di Colfosco, who gave him in dowry large territories in the area. He was the first member of the family to use the title of Ceneda, Serravalle and Zumelle.

Around 1150 he had the castle of Camino fortified, after which it became the family's stronghold and namesake. In c. 1164 he took part in an imperial league against the commune of Treviso, alongside emperor Frederick Barbarossa. In 1183, after having been defeated, he submitted to the Trevigiani, declaring himself a citizen of the March's capital and accepting that commune's jurisdiction above his possessions.

== Sources ==
- Angella, Enrica; Pietro Bongi (1993). Sulle terre dei da Camino. Pieve da Soligo: Bubola & Naibo.
