= Borgo Valbelluna =

- Comune
- Comune di Borgo Valbelluna
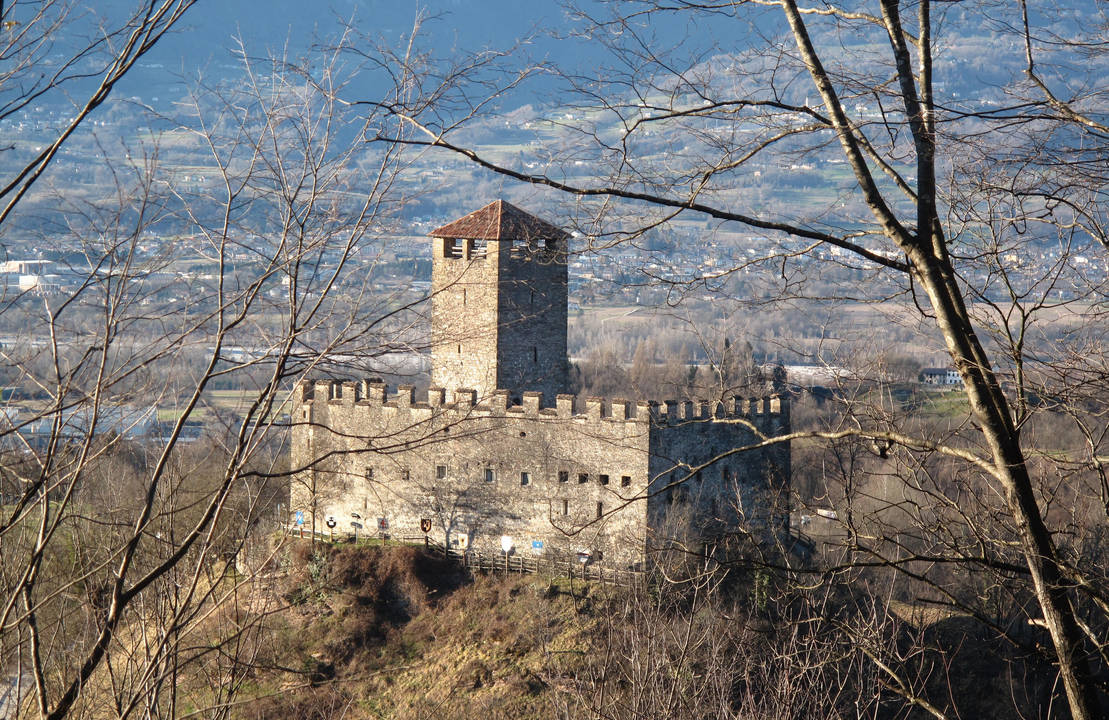

- Location within Italy Location within Veneto
- Coordinates: 46°3′43″N 12°4′46″E
- Country: Italy
- Region: Veneto
- Province: Belluno (BL)

Government
  - Mayor: Stefano Cesa

Area
  - Total: 167.69 km^{2} (64.75 sq mi)

Population (31 October 2019)
  - Total: 13,645
  - Density: 81.370/km^{2} (210.75/sq mi)
- Time zone: UTC+1 (CET)
  - Summer (DST): UTC+2 (CEST)
- Postal code: 32026
- Dialing code: 0437

Borgo Valbelluna is a comune in the Province of Belluno in the Italian region of Veneto. It was established on 30 January 2019 with the merger of the three municipalities of Trichiana, Mel and Lentiai.

The land hosts many works of Medieval art, realized from the 6th century to the Late Gothic.
