= Zumelle Castle =

Castle in Tiago, Italy

Coordinates: 46°2′10.50″N 12°4′54″E

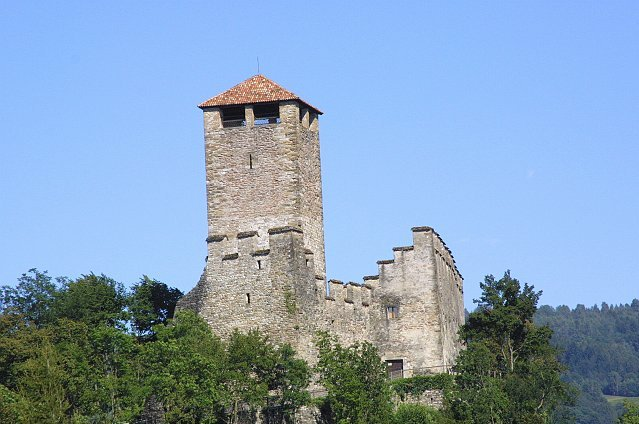
The castle seen from north-west.

Zumelle Castle is a castle near the village of Tiago in the municipality of Borgo Valbelluna, province of Belluno, northern-eastern Italy.

Nearby the castle is the early medieval church of San Donato, of Lombard origins.

== History ==
The first fortification on the site existed perhaps as early as c. 46–47 CE when the Romans were consolidating their hold in the Valbelluna, conquered in the first century BCE. This fortification sat in a strategic location, commanding the road coming from the plain through the Praderadego, which has been identified as the Via Claudia Augusta Altinatis – or more likely, one of its side branches.

During and after the fall of the Western Roman Empire, the castle was the major stronghold of the area as it guarded the connections between Feltre and Ceneda. According to a legend, the ruined fortification was rebuilt by one Gaiseric (or Genseric), a faithful of queen Amalasuntha. After her assassination, he established a settlement here and had two twins (Italian: gemelle), whence the name. During the early Middle Ages the castle was the location of a feudal struggle beginning in 737, when the Lombard king Liutprand appointed Valentino, bishop of Ceneda, as lord of Zumelle. This caused a controversy with John, count-bishop of Belluno, who already ruled these lands; the war ended in 750 after the intervention of the new king Aistulf. In 963, Emperor Otto I gave the county of Zumelle to the bishops of Belluno.

In 1037 emperor Conrad II assigned it to his baron Abelfred. The latter died with no male heirs, and the castle went to his daughter Adelheit, who married Wilfred of Colfosco. Their daughter Sofia in turn married Guecellone II da Camino, and thenceforth the castle was owned by the Caminesi family.

The castle was rebuilt in 1311 by Rizzardo IV da Camino, lord of Treviso, Belluno and Feltre, but after its conquest by the Republic of Venice it lost its importance. In 1501 it was sacked by imperial troops during the War of the League of Cambrai. Restored, it was subsequently owned by the Zorzi and Gritti families and, after the fall of the Venetian Republic, by the Austrian Empire. In 1872 it was acquired by the commune of Mel, which is still the current owner.
