= Lentiai =

- Comune
- Comune di Lentiai
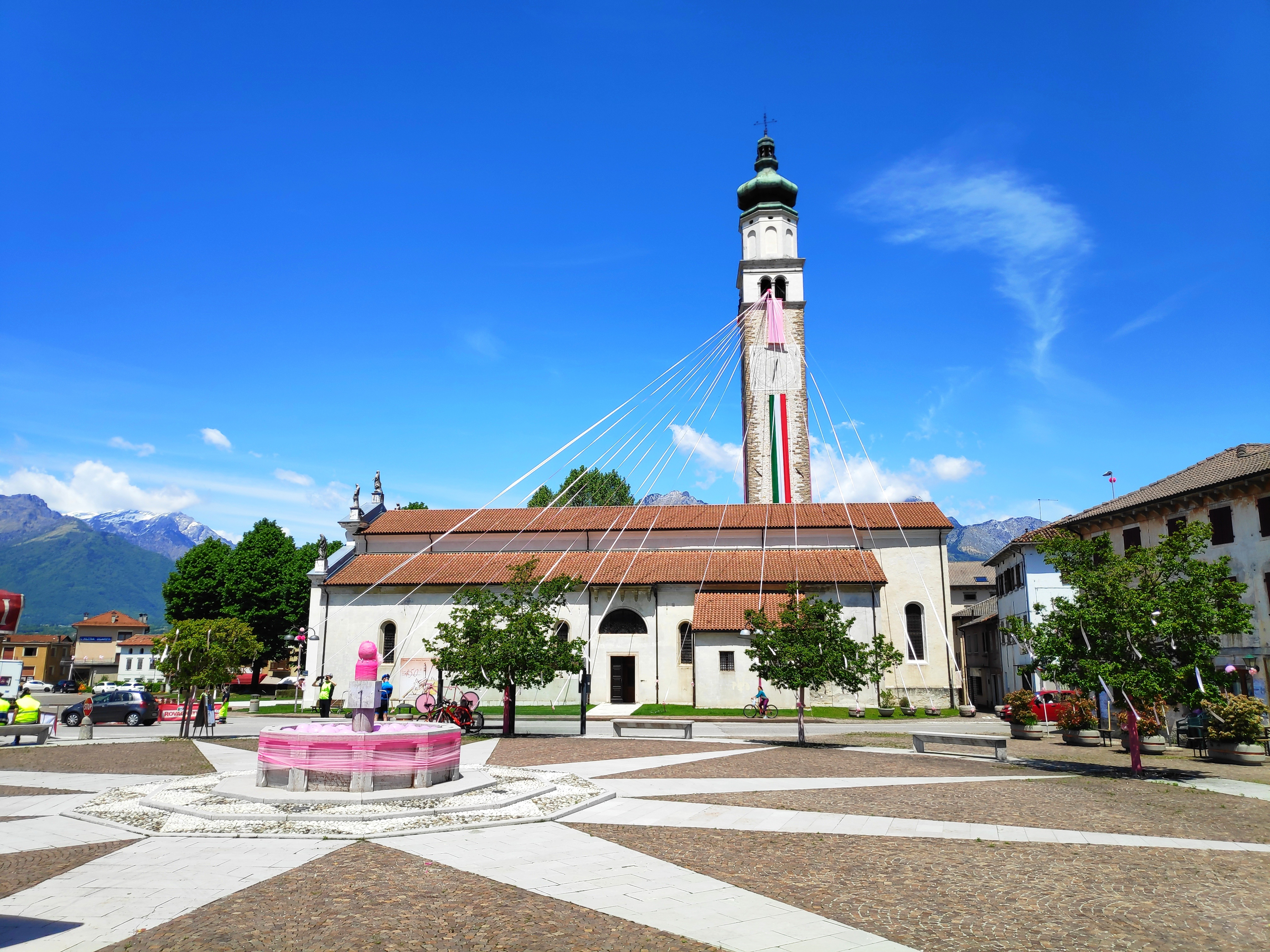
- Piazza Crivellaro

- Location within Italy Location within Veneto
- Coordinates: 46°3′N 12°1′E
- Country: Italy
- Region: Veneto
- Province: Province of Belluno (BL)

Government
  - Mayor: Dott. Flavio Tremea

Area
  - Total: 37.6 km^{2} (14.5 sq mi)

Population (Dec. 2004)
  - Total: 3,020
  - Density: 80.3/km^{2} (208/sq mi)
- Time zone: UTC+1 (CET)
  - Summer (DST): UTC+2 (CEST)
- Postal code: 32020
- Dialing code: 0437
- Website: http://www.comune.lentiai.bl.it/

Lentiai was a comune (municipality) in the province of Belluno in the Italian region of Veneto, located about 70 kilometres (43 mi) northwest of Venice and about 20 kilometres (12 mi) southwest of Belluno. As of 31 December 2004, it had a population of 3,020 and an area of 37.6 square kilometres (14.5 mi^{2}). It was merged with Mel and Trichiana to form Borgo Valbelluna.

Lentiai borders the following municipalities: Cesiomaggiore, Feltre, Mel, Santa Giustina, Valdobbiadene, Vas.

== Demographic evolution ==
Historical population

Year	Pop.	±%
1861	?	—
1871	2,880	—
1881	3,102	+7.7%
1901	3,139	+1.2%
1911	3,384	+7.8%

Year	Pop.	±%
1921	3,787	+11.9%
1931	3,452	−8.8%
1936	2,909	−15.7%
1951	2,951	+1.4%
1961	2,706	−8.3%

Year	Pop.	±%
1971	2,543	−6.0%
1981	2,811	+10.5%
1991	2,801	−0.4%
2001	2,959	+5.6%

Source: Data from ISTAT
