= Lake Meugliano =

Lake of Piedmont, Northern Italy

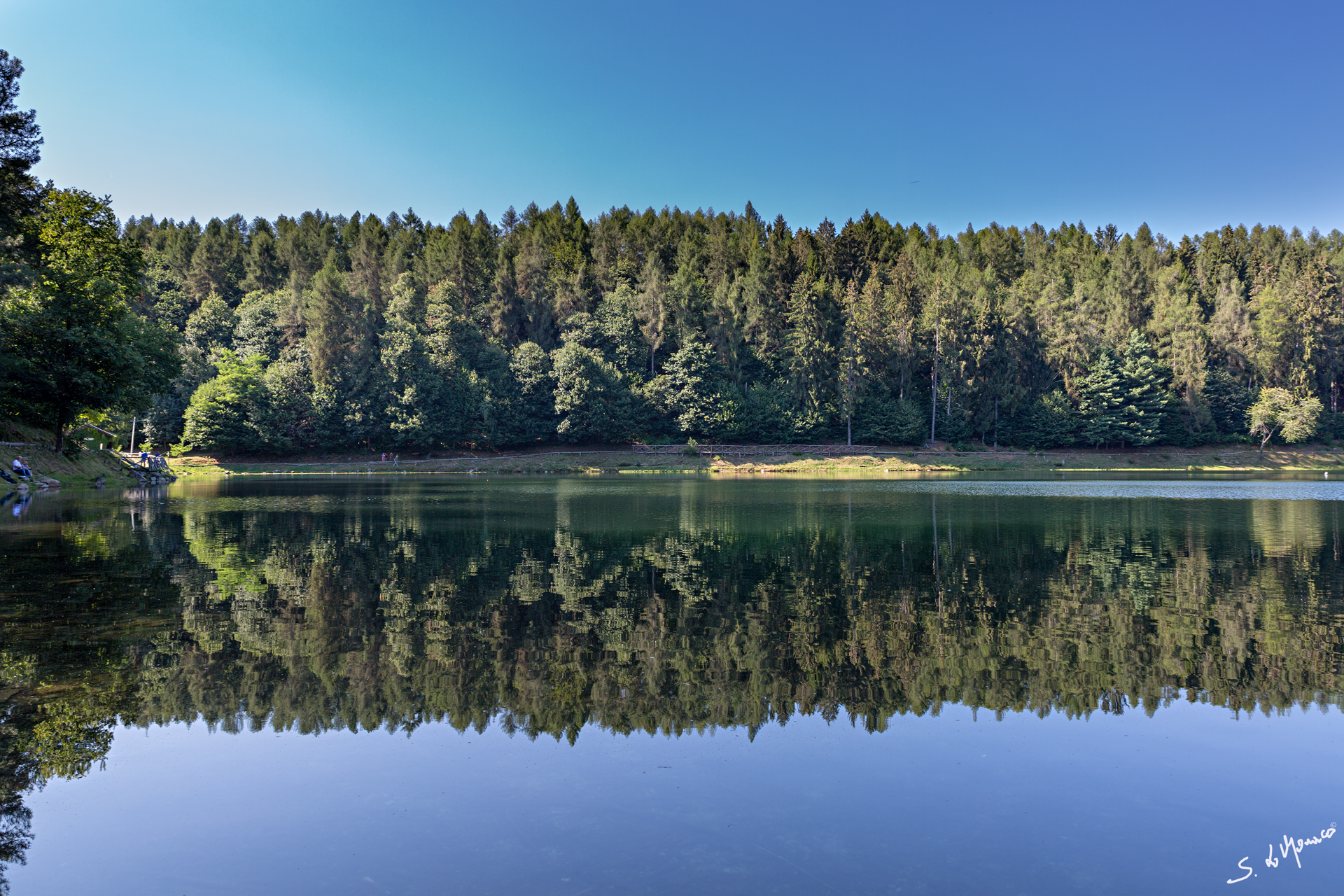
- Lake Meugliano in 2019

- Location within Piedmont
- Location: Meugliano, Piedmont
- Coordinates: 45°28′36.33″N 7°47′23.36″E
- Catchment area: 0.18 km^{2} (0.069 sq mi)
- Basin countries: Italy
- Max. length: 0.23 km (0.14 mi)
- Max. width: 0.16 km (0.099 mi)
- Surface area: 0.029 km^{2} (0.011 sq mi)
- Max. depth: 11 m (36 ft)
- Surface elevation: 717 m (2,352 ft)

Lake Meugliano (Italian: Lago di Meugliano) is a lake located in Meugliano, Piedmont, Italy.

== Description ==
The lake has a water surface area of 0.029 km², a basin area of 0.18 km², and is located at an altitude of 717 meters above sea level.

The lake's shallow depth promotes freezing during the winter season.

The lake is surrounded by coniferous forests, consisting mainly of larches, Norway spruces, and Scots pines. Nearby, there is a substantial stand of birch trees that were introduced in the 1930s.

== Nature protection ==
The lake is part of the Site of Community Importance known as Laghi di Meugliano e Alice (code IT1110034), established under Directive 92/43/EEC (Habitats Directive) and designated as a Special Area of Conservation.

== Gallery ==
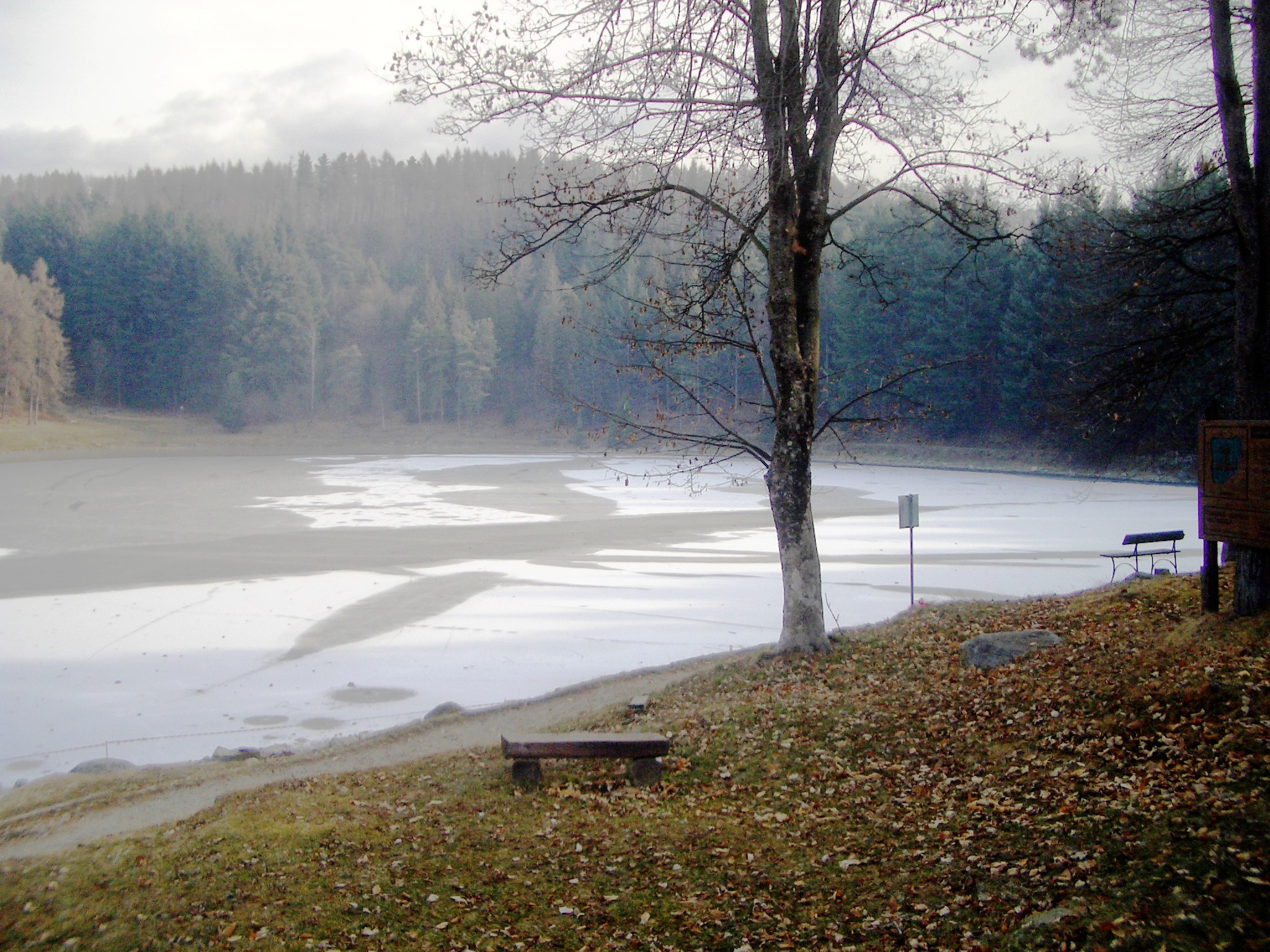

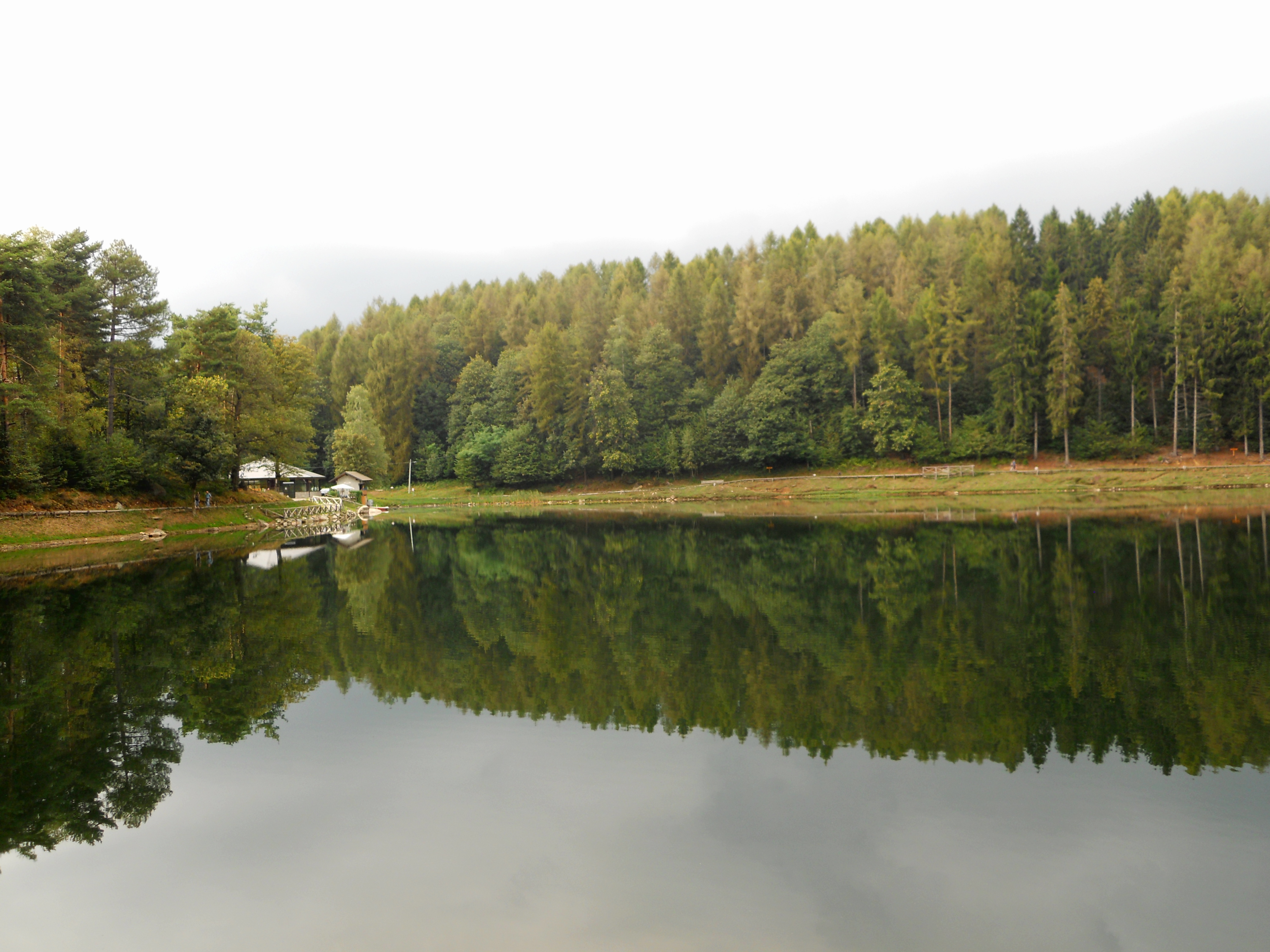

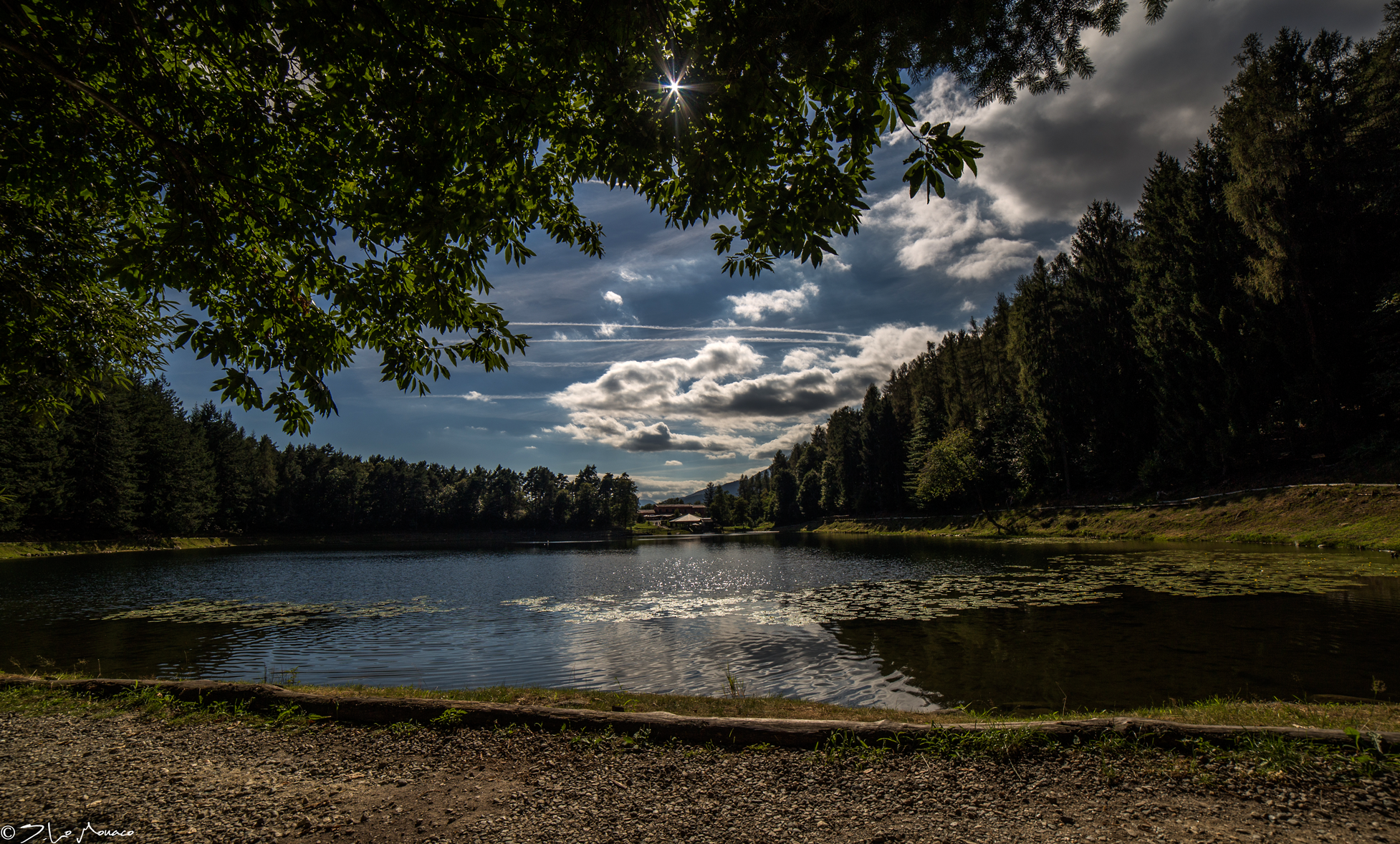
