= Valchiusa =

- Comune
- Comune di Valchiusa
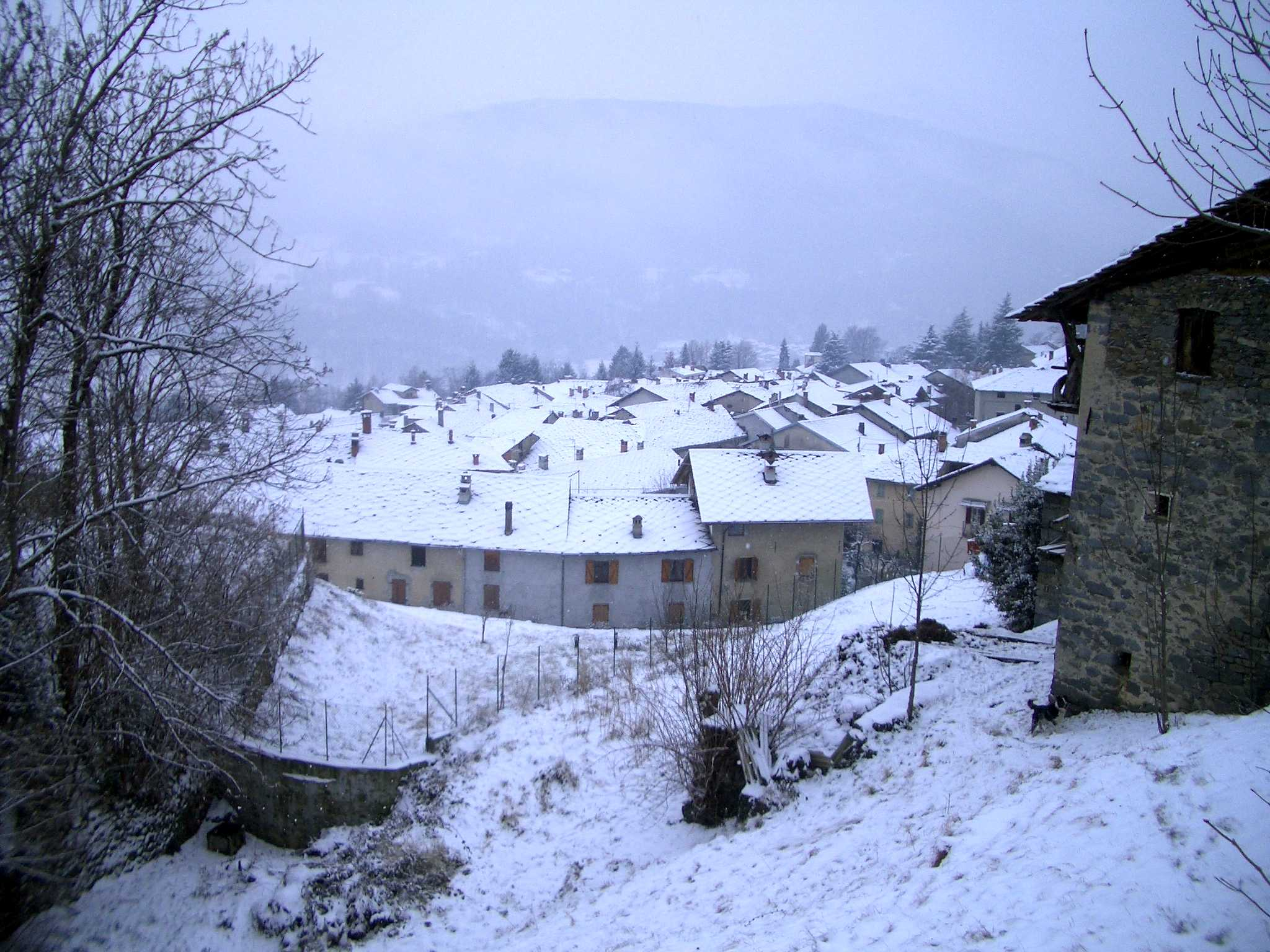

- Location within Italy Location within Piedmont
- Coordinates: 45°31′12.65″N 7°43′50.77″E
- Country: Italy
- Region: Piedmont
- Metropolitan city: Turin (TO)

Area
  - Total: 49.61 km^{2} (19.15 sq mi)
- Elevation: 738 m (2,421 ft)

Population (30-11-2018)
  - Total: 1,031
  - Density: 20.78/km^{2} (53.83/sq mi)
- Time zone: UTC+1 (CET)
  - Summer (DST): UTC+2 (CEST)
- Postal code: 10089
- Dialing code: 0125

Valchiusa is a comune (municipality) in the Metropolitan City of Turin in the Italian region Piedmont, located about 68.1 kilometres (42.3 mi) north of Turin. It was formed on 1 January 2019 with the merger of the comunes of Meugliano, Trausella and Vico Canavese.
