= Meugliano =

District of Valchiusa, Turin, Italy

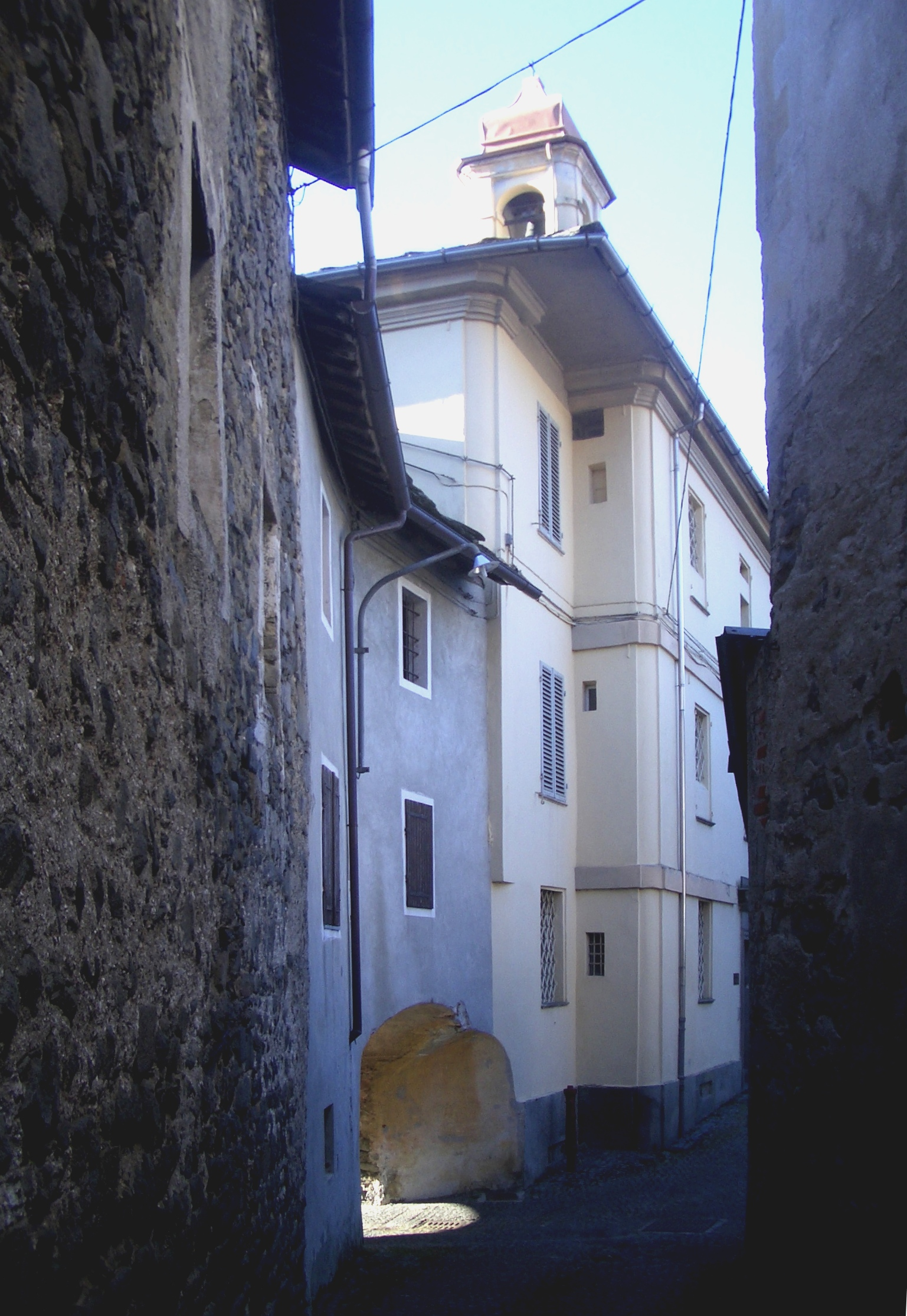
A view in Meugliano.

Meugliano is a frazione of the comune of Valchiusa in the Metropolitan City of Turin in the Italian region Piedmont, located about 45 kilometres (28 mi) north of Turin. From 1 January 2019, it was merged with Trausella and Vico Canavese to form the new comune.
