= Vigo Rendena =

- Comune
- Comune di Vigo Rendena
- Location within Italy Location within Trentino-Alto Adige/Südtirol
- Coordinates: 46°5′N 10°43′E
- Country: Italy
- Region: Trentino-Alto Adige/Südtirol
- Province: Trentino (TN)

Area
  - Total: 4.5 km^{2} (1.7 sq mi)
- Elevation: 612 m (2,008 ft)

Population (Dec. 2004)
  - Total: 456
  - Density: 100/km^{2} (260/sq mi)
- Demonym: Vighesi
- Time zone: UTC+1 (CET)
  - Summer (DST): UTC+2 (CEST)
- Postal code: 38080
- Dialing code: 0465

Vigo Rendena (Vich in local dialect) was a comune (municipality) in Trentino in the northern Italian region Trentino-Alto Adige/Südtirol, located about 30 kilometres (19 mi) west of Trento. As of 31 December 2004, it had a population of 456 and an area of 4.5 square kilometres (1.7 mi^{2}). It was merged with Villa Rendena and Darè on January 1, 2016, to form a new municipality, Porte di Rendena.

Vigo Rendena borders the following municipalities: Pelugo, Montagne, Villa Rendena and Darè.

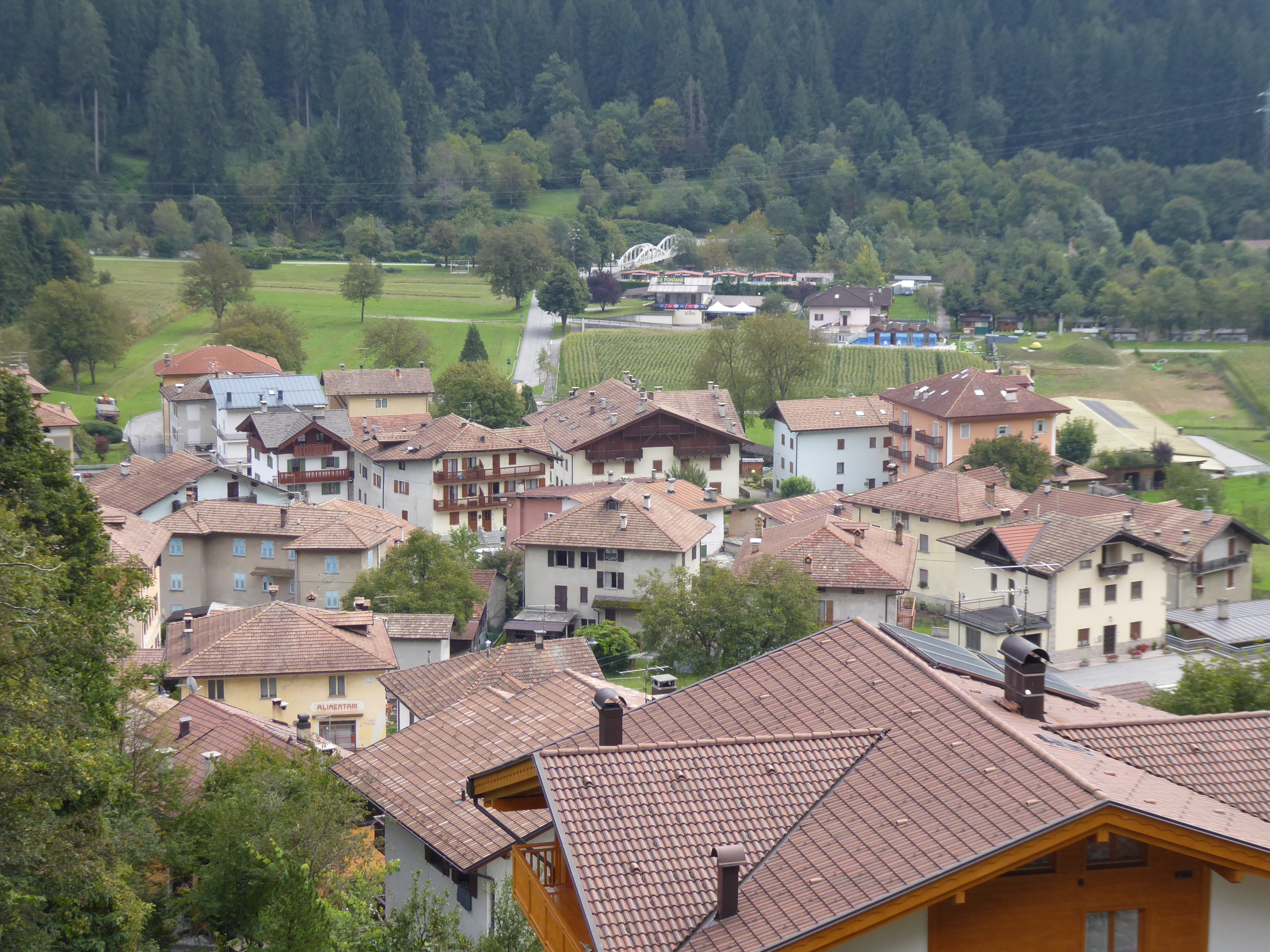

== Demographic evolution ==
Historical population

Year	Pop.	±%
1861	?	—
1871	?	—
1881	?	—
1901	?	—
1911	?	—

Year	Pop.	±%
1921	447	—
1931	359	−19.7%
1936	267	−25.6%
1951	329	+23.2%
1961	343	+4.3%

Year	Pop.	±%
1971	340	−0.9%
1981	375	+10.3%
1991	351	−6.4%
2001	406	+15.7%

Source: Data from ISTAT
