= Darè =

Coordinates: 46°04′32″N 10°43′03″E

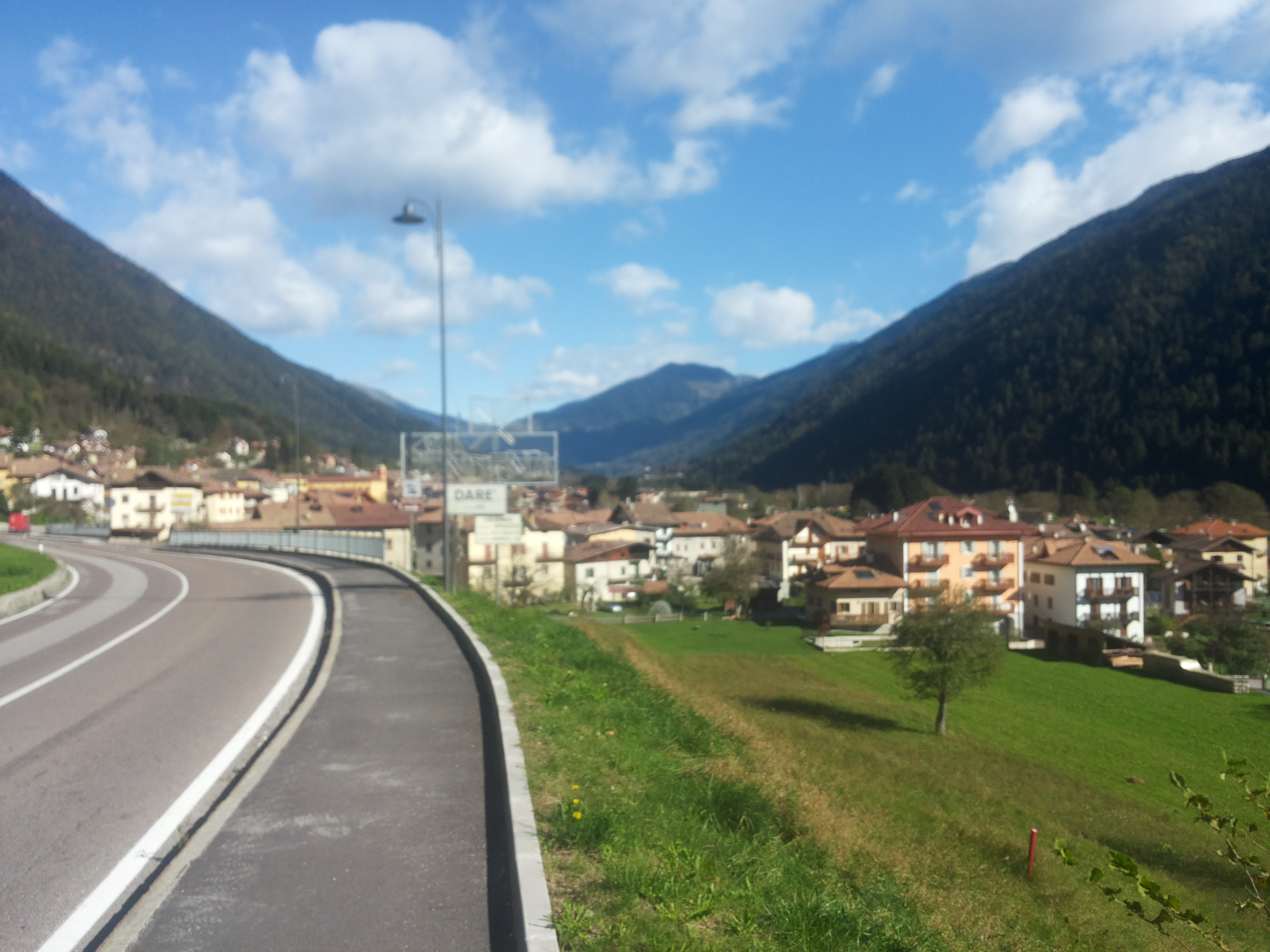
Darè Municipality

Darè (Daré in local dialect) was a comune (municipality) in Trentino in the northern Italian region Trentino-Alto Adige/Südtirol, located about 30 kilometres (19 mi) west of Trento. It was merged with Villa Rendena and Vigo Rendena on January 1, 2016, to form a new municipality, Porte di Rendena.
