= Alice Superiore =

- Frazione
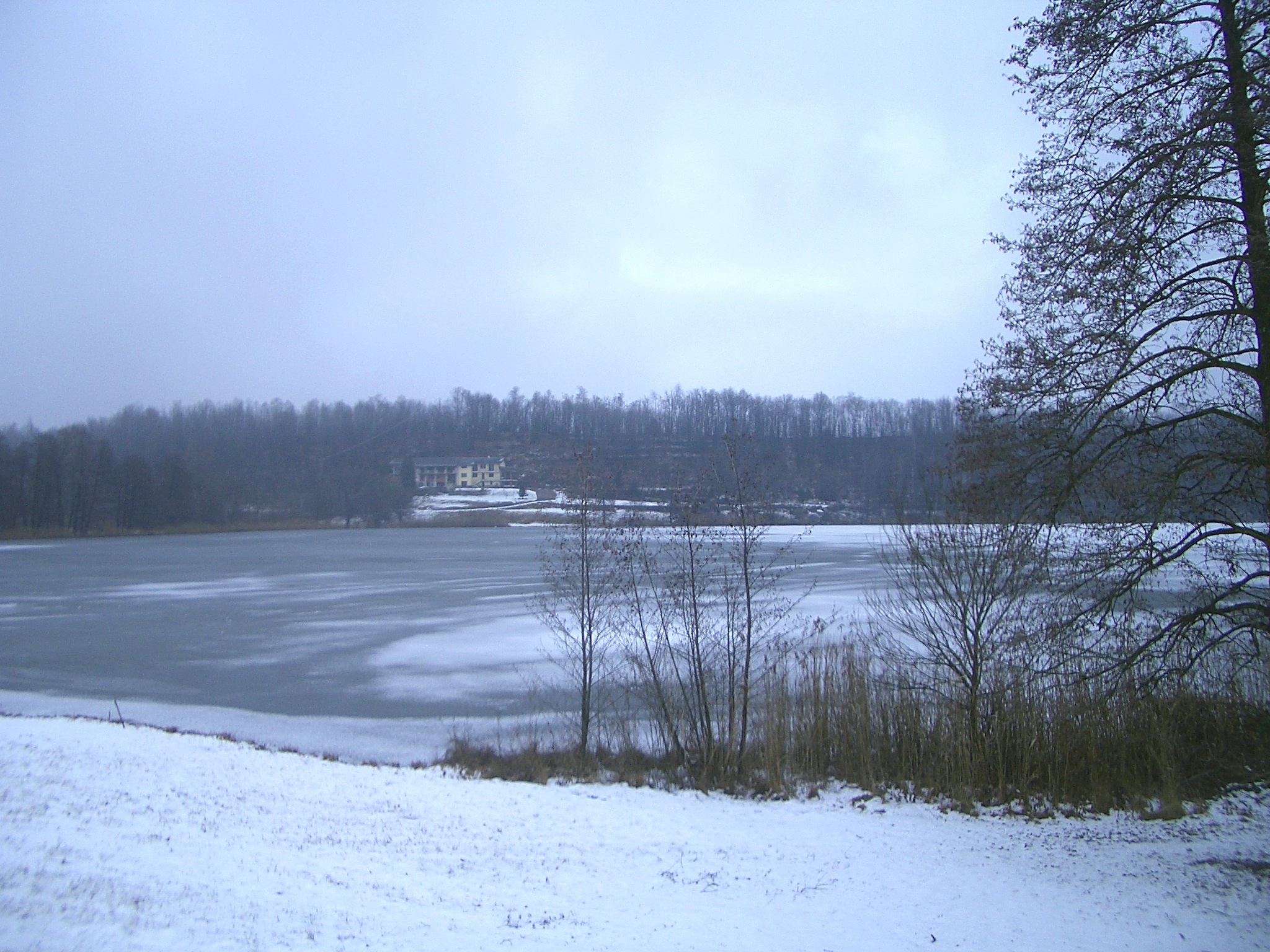

- Location of Alice Superiore in Italy
- Country: Italy
- Region: Piedmont
- Metropolitan city: Turin (TO)
- Comune: Val di Chy
- Time zone: UTC+1 (CET)
  - Summer (DST): UTC+2 (CEST)

Alice Superiore (Piedmontese: Àles) is a frazione of the comune of Val di Chy in the Metropolitan City of Turin in the Italian region of Piedmont, located about 45 kilometres (28 mi) north of Turin, and 11 kilometres (6.8 mi) west of Ivrea.

It was an independent comune, from the 1871 census, until 2019.

There is year-round camping in Alice Superiore.

== See also ==
- Lago di Alice (Lake Alice)
