= Cellio =

- Frazione
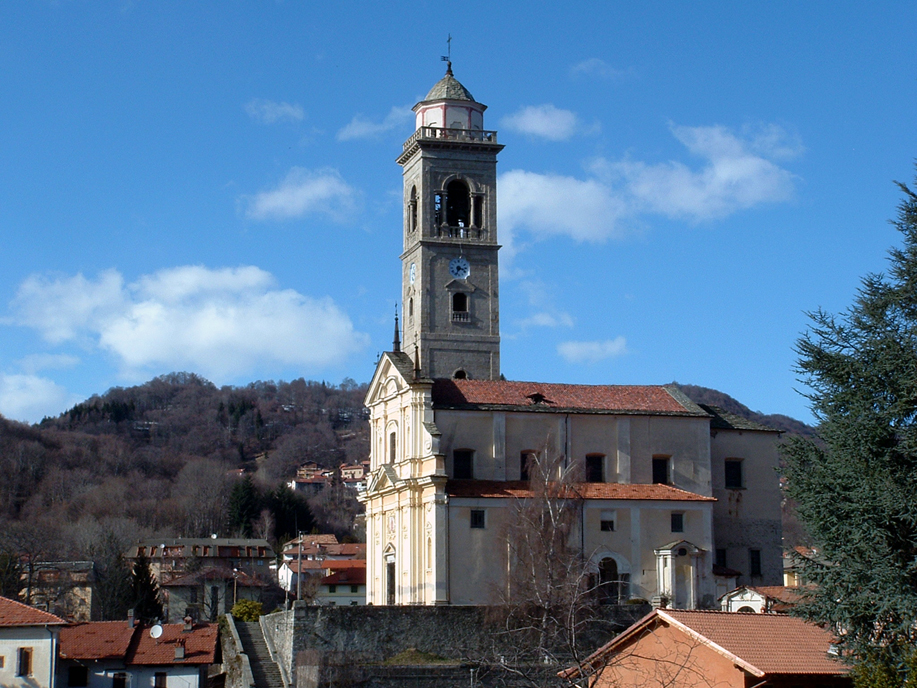
- Parish church of San Lorenzo.

- Location of Cellio in Italy
- Coordinates: 45°43′N 8°16′E
- Country: Italy
- Region: Piedmont
- Province: Vercelli (VC)
- Comune: Cellio con Breia

Area
  - Total: 10.0 km^{2} (3.9 sq mi)
- Elevation: 685 m (2,247 ft)

Population (Dec. 2004)
  - Total: 898
  - Density: 89.8/km^{2} (233/sq mi)
- Demonym: Celliesi
- Time zone: UTC+1 (CET)
  - Summer (DST): UTC+2 (CEST)
- Postal code: 13024
- Dialing code: 0163

Cellio is a frazione of Cellio con Breia in the Province of Vercelli in the Italian region Piedmont, located about 80 kilometres (50 mi) northeast of Turin and about 45 kilometres (28 mi) north of Vercelli.
