= Villa Rendena =

Italian comune

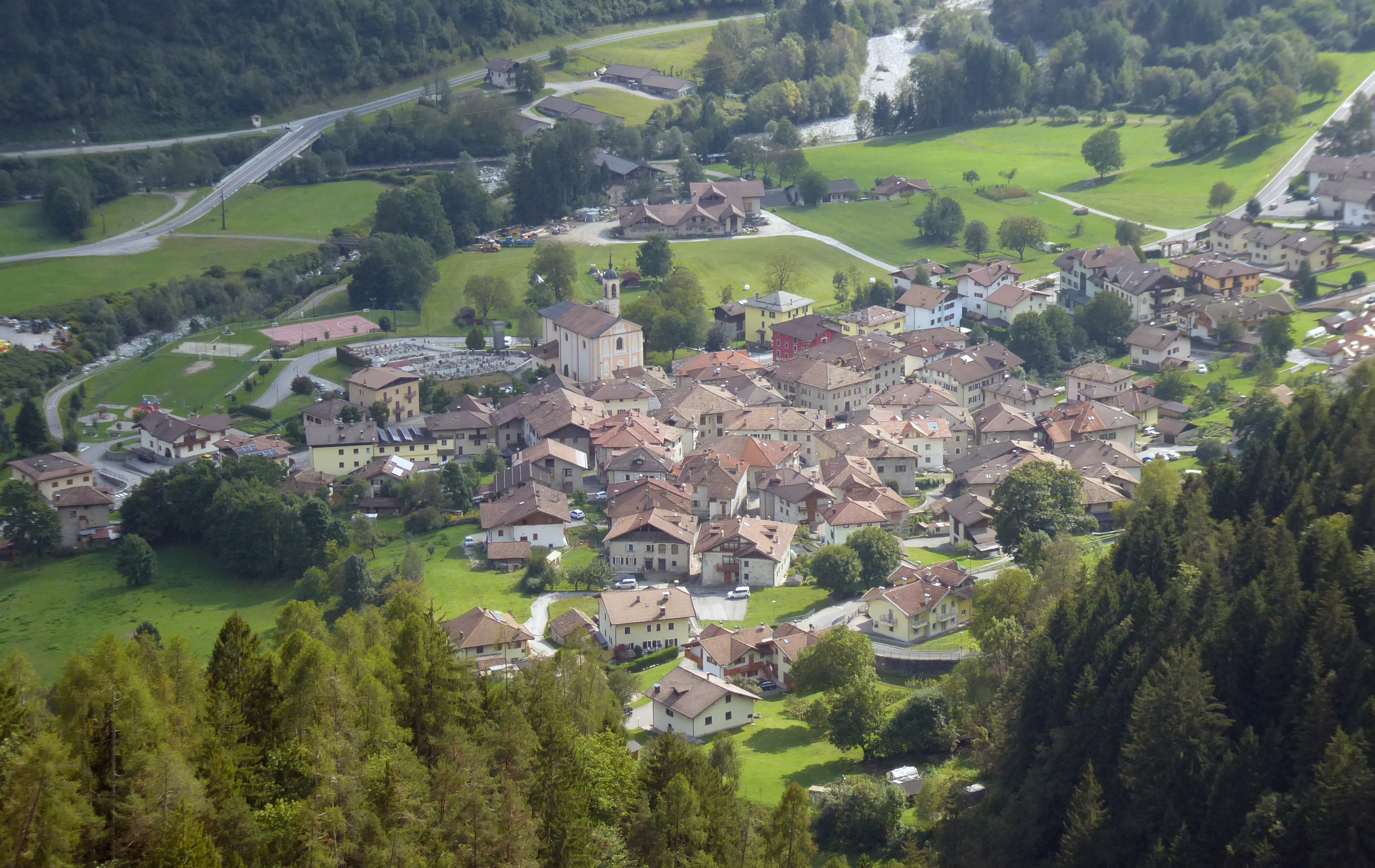
Villa Rendena in 2021

Villa Rendena (locally called Villa) was a comune (municipality) in Trentino in the northern Italian region Trentino-Alto Adige/Südtirol, located about 30 kilometres (19 mi) west of Trento. It was merged with Vigo Rendena and Darè on January 1, 2016, to form a new municipality, Porte di Rendena.
