= Osmate =

- Comune
- Comune di Osmate
- Location within Italy Location within Lombardy
- Coordinates: 45°47′N 8°40′E
- Country: Italy
- Region: Lombardy
- Province: Province of Varese (VA)

Area
  - Total: 3.4 km^{2} (1.3 sq mi)

Population (Dec. 2004)
  - Total: 550
  - Density: 160/km^{2} (420/sq mi)
- Time zone: UTC+1 (CET)
  - Summer (DST): UTC+2 (CEST)
- Postal code: 21018
- Dialing code: 0331

Osmate was a comune (municipality) in the Province of Varese in the Italian region Lombardy, located about 50 kilometres (31 mi) northwest of Milan and about 13 kilometres (8 mi) southwest of Varese. As of 31 December 2004, it had a population of 550 and an area of 3.4 square kilometres (1.3 mi^{2}).

In 2019 it merged with the nearby Cadrezzate forming the new municipality of Cadrezzate con Osmate.

== Demographic evolution ==
Historical population

Year	Pop.	±%
1861	301	—
1871	328	+9.0%
1881	373	+13.7%
1901	420	+12.6%
1911	400	−4.8%

Year	Pop.	±%
1921	355	−11.3%
1931	355	+0.0%
1936	320	−9.9%
1951	321	+0.3%
1961	363	+13.1%

Year	Pop.	±%
1971	433	+19.3%
1981	484	+11.8%
1991	426	−12.0%
2001	447	+4.9%

Source: Data from ISTAT
