= Cadrezzate =

Former Italian comune

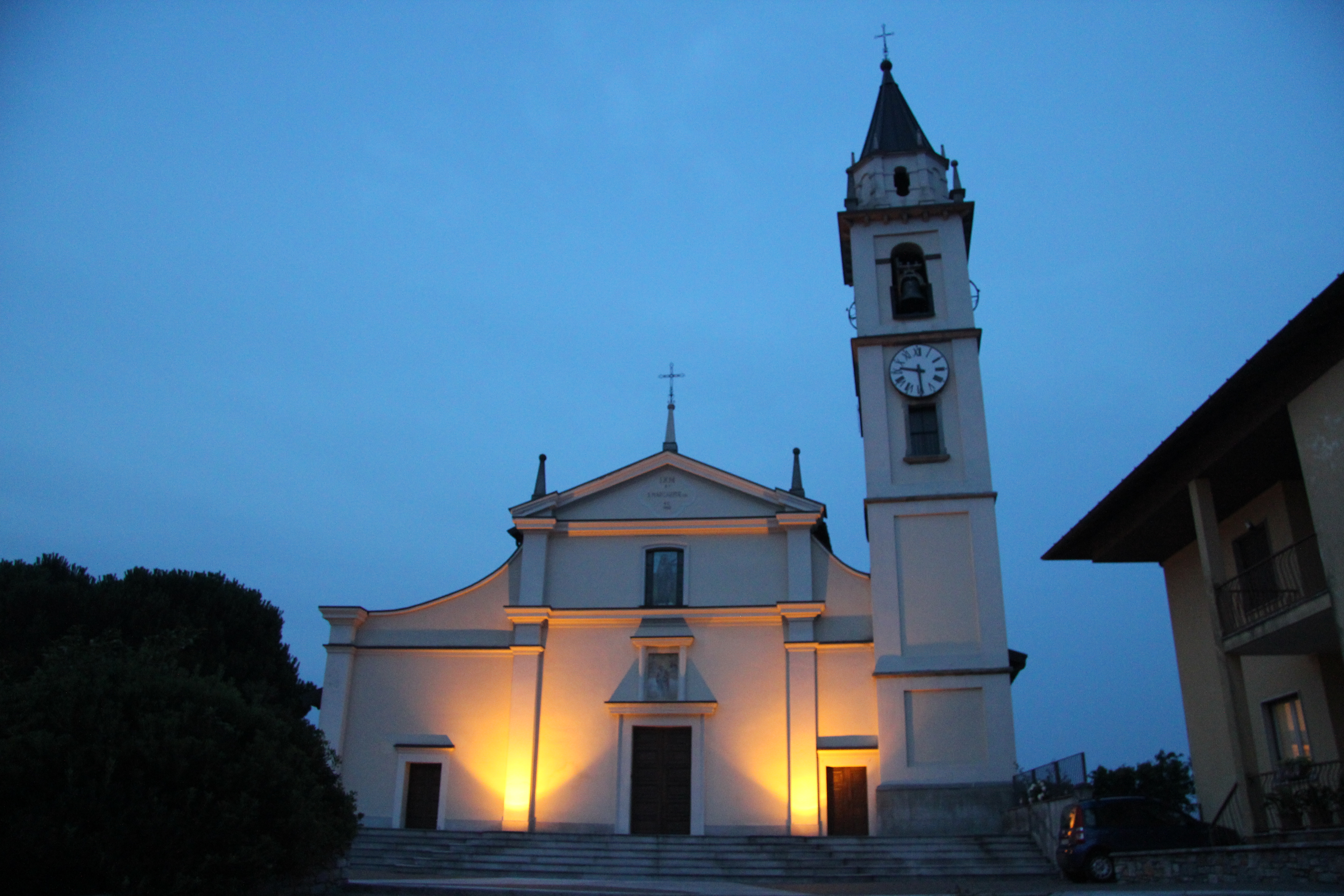
Chiesa S. Margherita di Cadrezzate

Cadrezzate was a comune (municipality) in the Province of Varese in the Italian region Lombardy, located about 50 kilometres (31 mi) northwest of Milan and about 14 kilometres (9 mi) west of Varese.

In 2019 it merged with the nearby Osmate forming the new municipality of Cadrezzate con Osmate.

== Main sights ==
It was home to one or more prehistoric pile-dwelling (or stilt house) settlements that are part of the Prehistoric Pile dwellings around the Alps UNESCO World Heritage Site.
