= Cellio con Breia =

- Comune
- Comune di Cellio con Breia
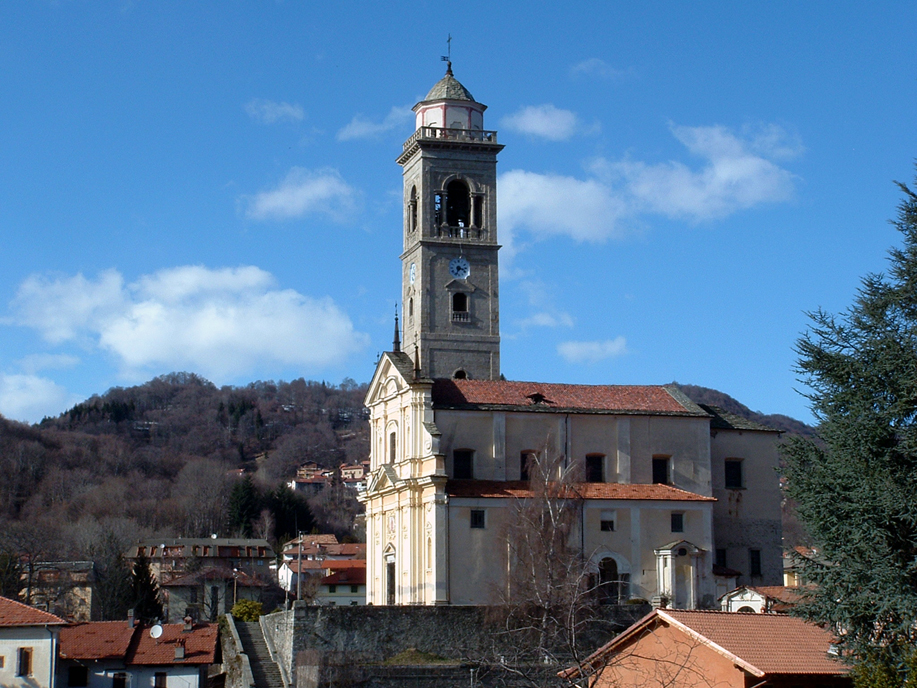
- View of Cellio.

- Location within Italy Location within Piedmont
- Coordinates: 45°45′25.56″N 8°18′42.12″E
- Country: Italy
- Region: Piedmont
- Province: Vercelli (VC)
- Frazioni: Breia, Cellio

Government
  - Mayor: Daniele Todaro

Area
  - Total: 685 km^{2} (264 sq mi)
- Elevation: 685 m (2,247 ft)

Population (31 August 2017)
  - Total: 992
  - Density: 1.45/km^{2} (3.75/sq mi)
- Time zone: UTC+1 (CET)
  - Summer (DST): UTC+2 (CEST)
- Website: Official website

Cellio con Breia is a comune (municipality) in the Province of Vercelli in the Italian region Piedmont, established on 1 January 2018 by the merger of the former comuni of Breia and Cellio, in the lower Valsesia.

== History ==
=== The Resistance ===
Cellio was the site of no less than two partisan battles during the resistance.

Moscatelli and Eraldo Gastone, in the first half of September 1943, placed a group of former English prisoners, partisan volunteers, in Agaria, a hamlet of Cellio.

It was the scene of a roundup on 19 January 1944. The Garibaldi Brigades had prepared various detachments on the roads leading to Cellio, such as the Gramsci detachment. Lorenzo Beltrametti fell in a vain attempt to blow up a German tank with a rudimentary device.

The Germans had the objective of neutralizing a Garibaldian command headquarters in Castagneia, just north of Breia. On September 9, 1944 the Loss flywheel even captured a tank which, however, cannot be used but only disarmed.
