= Cadrezzate con Osmate =

- Comune
- Comune di Cadrezzate con Osmate
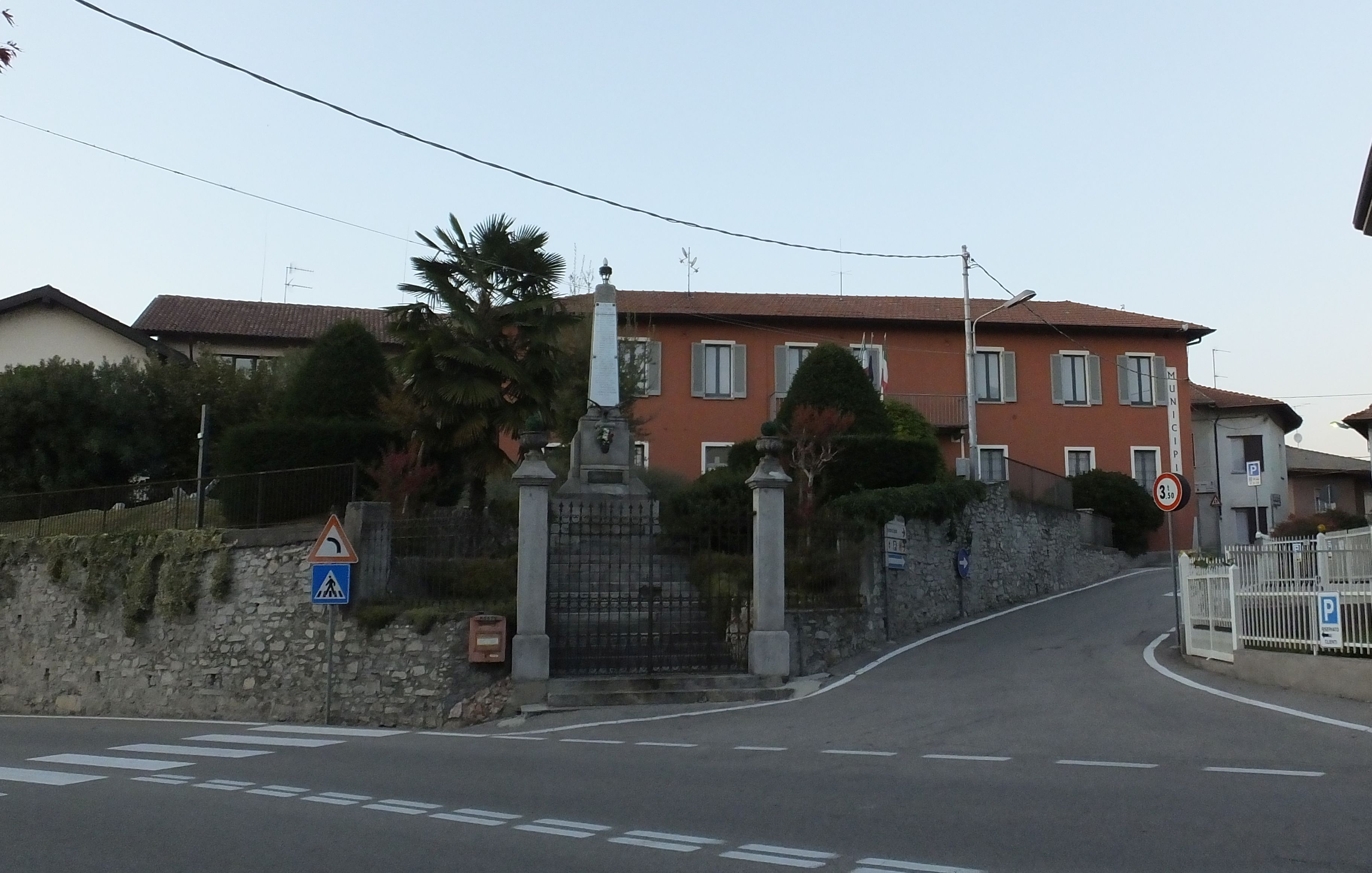
- The town hall, in Cadrezzate

- Location within Italy Location within Lombardy
- Coordinates: 45°47′52.52″N 8°38′35.3″E
- Country: Italy
- Region: Lombardy
- Province: Varese (VA)
- Frazioni: Cadrezzate, Osmate

Government
  - Mayor: Cristian Robustellini

Area
  - Total: 8.25 km^{2} (3.19 sq mi)

Population (31 December 2017)
  - Total: 2,659
  - Density: 322/km^{2} (835/sq mi)
- Demonym(s): Cadrezzatesi, Osmatesi
- Time zone: UTC+1 (CET)
  - Summer (DST): UTC+2 (CEST)
- Postal code: 21020
- Dialing code: 0331
- Website: www.comune.cadrezzateconosmate.va.it

Cadrezzate con Osmate is a comune (municipality) in the province of Varese, Lombardy, northern Italy. It was formed in 2019 by the merger of the previous comuni of Cadrezzate and Osmate.
