= Breia =

- Frazione
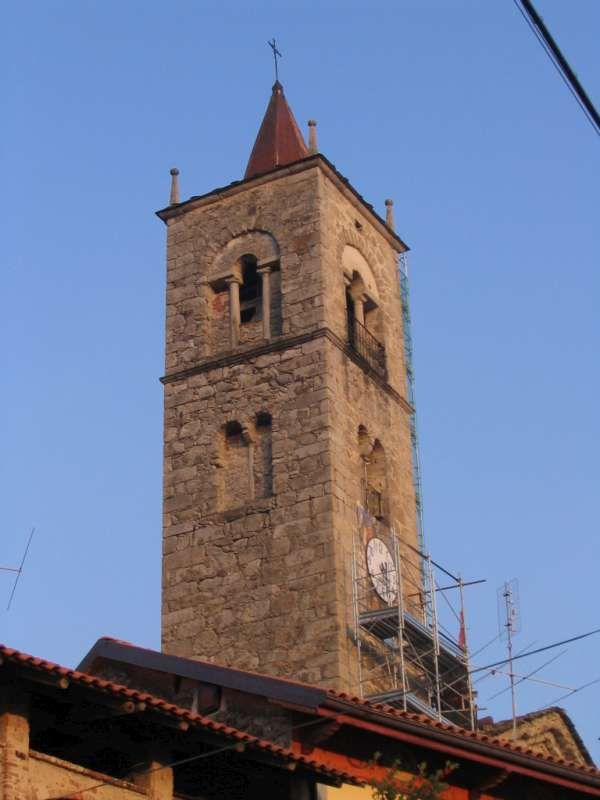
- Church in Breia.

- Location of Breia in Italy
- Coordinates: 45°46′N 8°18′E
- Country: Italy
- Region: Piedmont
- Province: Province of Vercelli (VC)
- Comune: Cellio con Breia

Area
  - Total: 7.23 km^{2} (2.79 sq mi)

Population (Dec. 2004)
  - Total: 184
  - Density: 25.4/km^{2} (65.9/sq mi)
- Time zone: UTC+1 (CET)
  - Summer (DST): UTC+2 (CEST)
- Postal code: 13020
- Dialing code: 0163

Breia is a frazione of Cellio con Breia in the Province of Vercelli in the Italian region Piedmont, located about 90 km (56 mi) northeast of Turin and about 50 km (31 mi) north of Vercelli.
