= Porte di Rendena =

- Comune
- Comune di Porte di Rendena
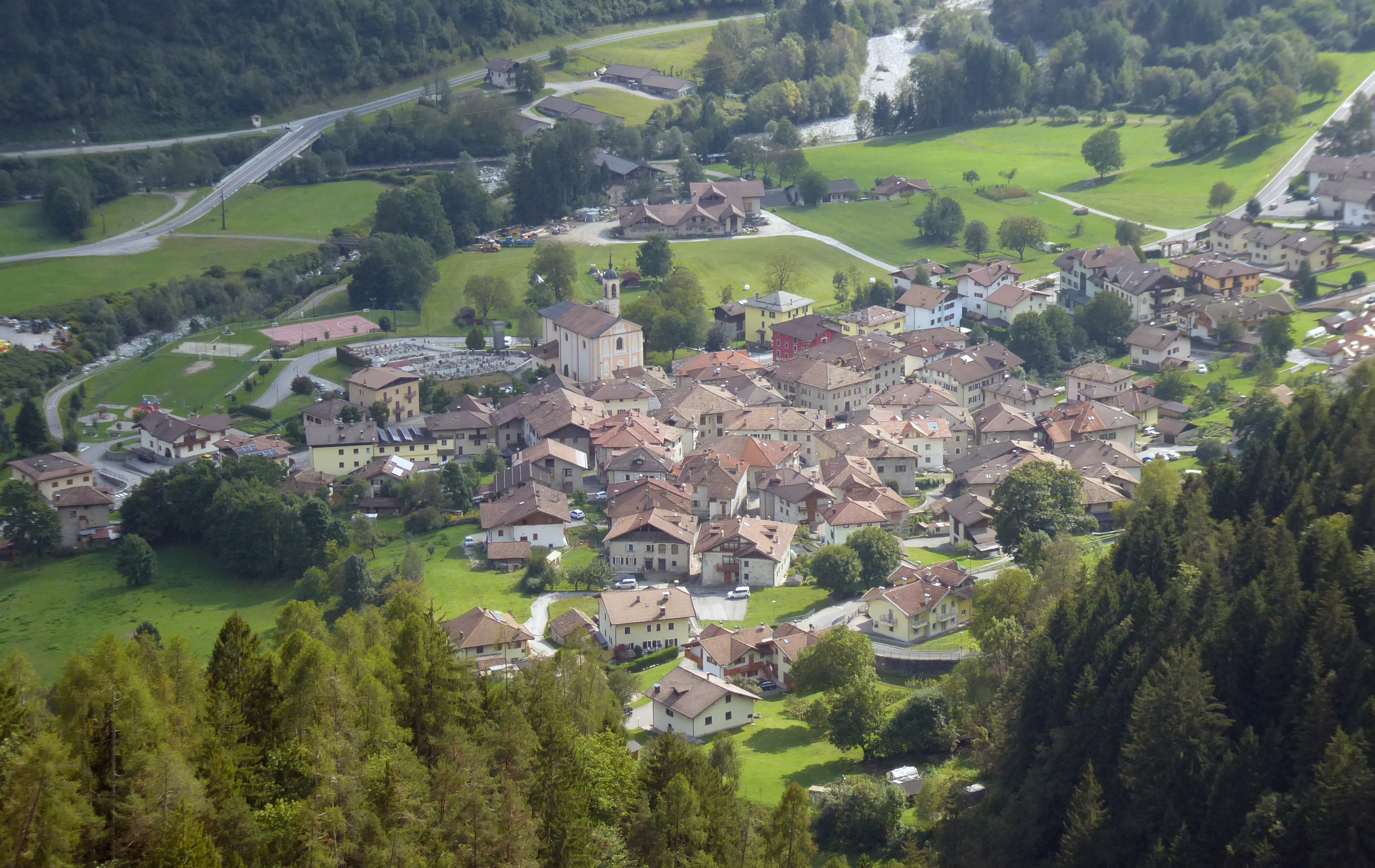
- Porte di Rendena as seen from Saint Valentine church.

- Location within Italy Location within Trentino-Alto Adige/Südtirol
- Coordinates: 46°05′N 10°43′E
- Country: Italy
- Region: Trentino-Alto Adige/Südtirol
- Province: Trento (TN)
- Frazioni: Darè, Javré, Verdesina, Vigo Rendena, Villa Rendena (communal seat)

Government
  - Mayor: Enrico Pellegrini

Area
  - Total: 40.71 km^{2} (15.72 sq mi)
- Elevation: 608 m (1,995 ft)

Population (30 June 2017)
  - Total: 1,803
  - Density: 44.29/km^{2} (114.7/sq mi)
- Time zone: UTC+1 (CET)
  - Summer (DST): UTC+2 (CEST)
- Postal code: 38066
- Dialing code: 0464
- Website: Official website

Porte di Rendena is a comune in the northern Italian province of Trento of the Trentino Alto Adige region. It was created on 1 January 2016 after the merger of the communes of Darè, Vigo Rendena and Villa Rendena.
