= Robecchetto con Induno =

Robecchetto con Induno Robecchett cont Indun (Lombard)
- Comune
- Comune di Robecchetto con Induno
- Coat of arms

- Location within Italy Location within Lombardy
- Coordinates: 45°32′N 8°46′E
- Country: Italy
- Region: Lombardy
- Metropolitan city: Milan (MI)

Government
  - Mayor: Giorgio Braga

Area
  - Total: 13.9 km^{2} (5.4 sq mi)
- Elevation: 172 m (564 ft)

Population (31 December 2010)
  - Total: 4,896
  - Density: 352/km^{2} (912/sq mi)
- Demonym: Robecchettesi
- Time zone: UTC+1 (CET)
  - Summer (DST): UTC+2 (CEST)
- Postal code: 20020
- Dialing code: 0331
- Website: Official website

Robecchetto con Induno (Milanese: Robecchett cont Indun, locally Rubichett) is a comune (municipality) in the Metropolitan City of Milan in the Italian region Lombardy, located about 30 kilometres (19 mi) west of Milan.

Robecchetto con Induno borders the following municipalities: Castano Primo, Turbigo, Cuggiono, Galliate.

== See also ==
- Georges Ernest Boulanger
