= Trausella =

- Comune
- Comune di Trausella
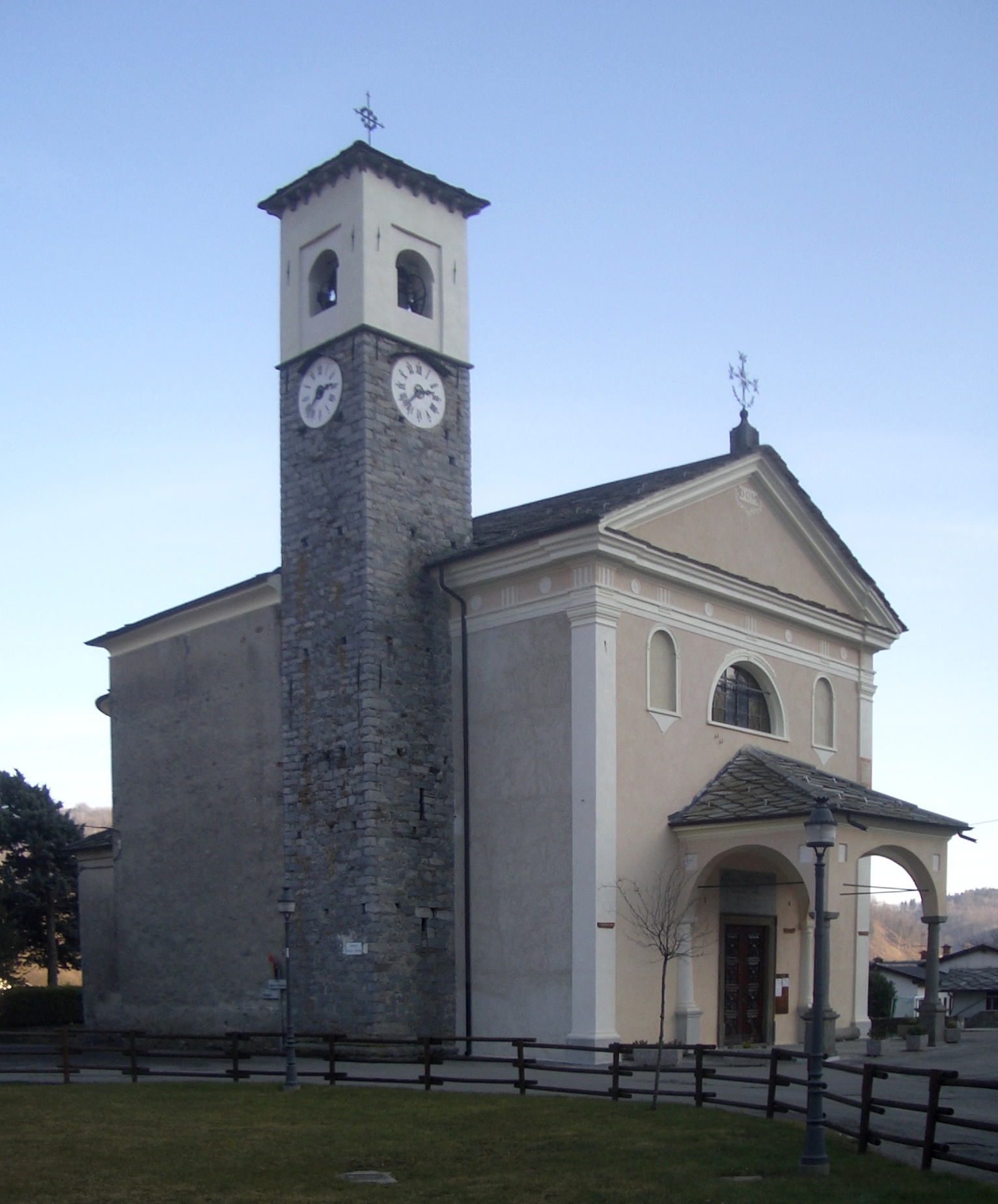
- Parish church.

- Location within Italy Location within Piedmont
- Coordinates: 45°29′N 7°46′E
- Country: Italy
- Region: Piedmont
- Metropolitan city: Turin (TO)

Government
  - Mayor: Michelangelo Boglino

Area
  - Total: 12.1 km^{2} (4.7 sq mi)
- Elevation: 654 m (2,146 ft)

Population (31 December 2010)
  - Total: 135
  - Density: 11.2/km^{2} (28.9/sq mi)
- Demonym: Trausellesi
- Time zone: UTC+1 (CET)
  - Summer (DST): UTC+2 (CEST)
- Postal code: 10080
- Dialing code: 0125

Trausella is a comune (municipality) in the Metropolitan City of Turin in the Italian region Piedmont, located about 45 kilometres (28 mi) north of Turin, in the Val Chiusella.
