= Vico Canavese =

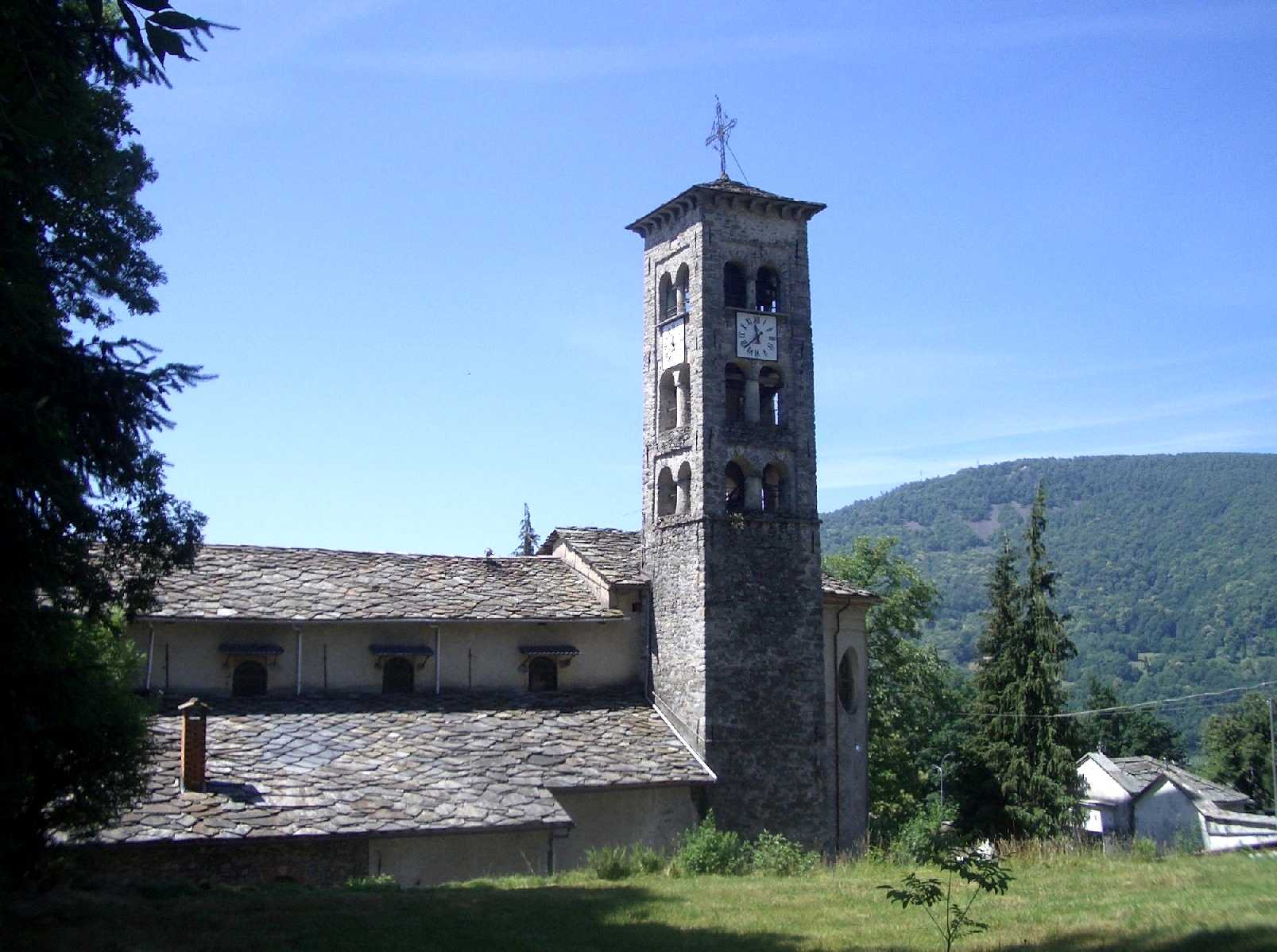
Parish church of San Giovanni.

Vico Canavese is a frazione of the comune (municipality) of Valchiusa in the Metropolitan City of Turin in the Italian region Piedmont, located about 50 kilometres (31 mi) north of Turin. It was a separate commune until 1 January 2019.
