= Trichiana =

- Comune
- Comune di Trichiana
- Location within Italy Location within Veneto
- Coordinates: 46°4′N 12°8′E
- Country: Italy
- Region: Veneto
- Province: Belluno (BL)
- Frazioni: Campedei, Carfagnoi, Casteldardo, Cavassico Inferiore, Cavassico Superiore, Confos, Frontin, Morgan, Niccia, Pialdier, Pranolz, San Felice, Sant'Antonio Tortal

Government
  - Mayor: Fiorenza Da Canal

Area
  - Total: 43.8 km^{2} (16.9 sq mi)
- Elevation: 347 m (1,138 ft)

Population (Dec. 2017)
  - Total: 4,820
  - Density: 110/km^{2} (285/sq mi)
- Demonym: Trichianesi
- Time zone: UTC+1 (CET)
  - Summer (DST): UTC+2 (CEST)
- Postal code: 32028
- Dialing code: 0437
- Website: Official website

Trichiana is a comune (municipality) in the Province of Belluno in the Italian region Veneto, located about 70 kilometres (43 miles) north of Venice and about 10 kilometres (6 miles) southwest of Belluno.

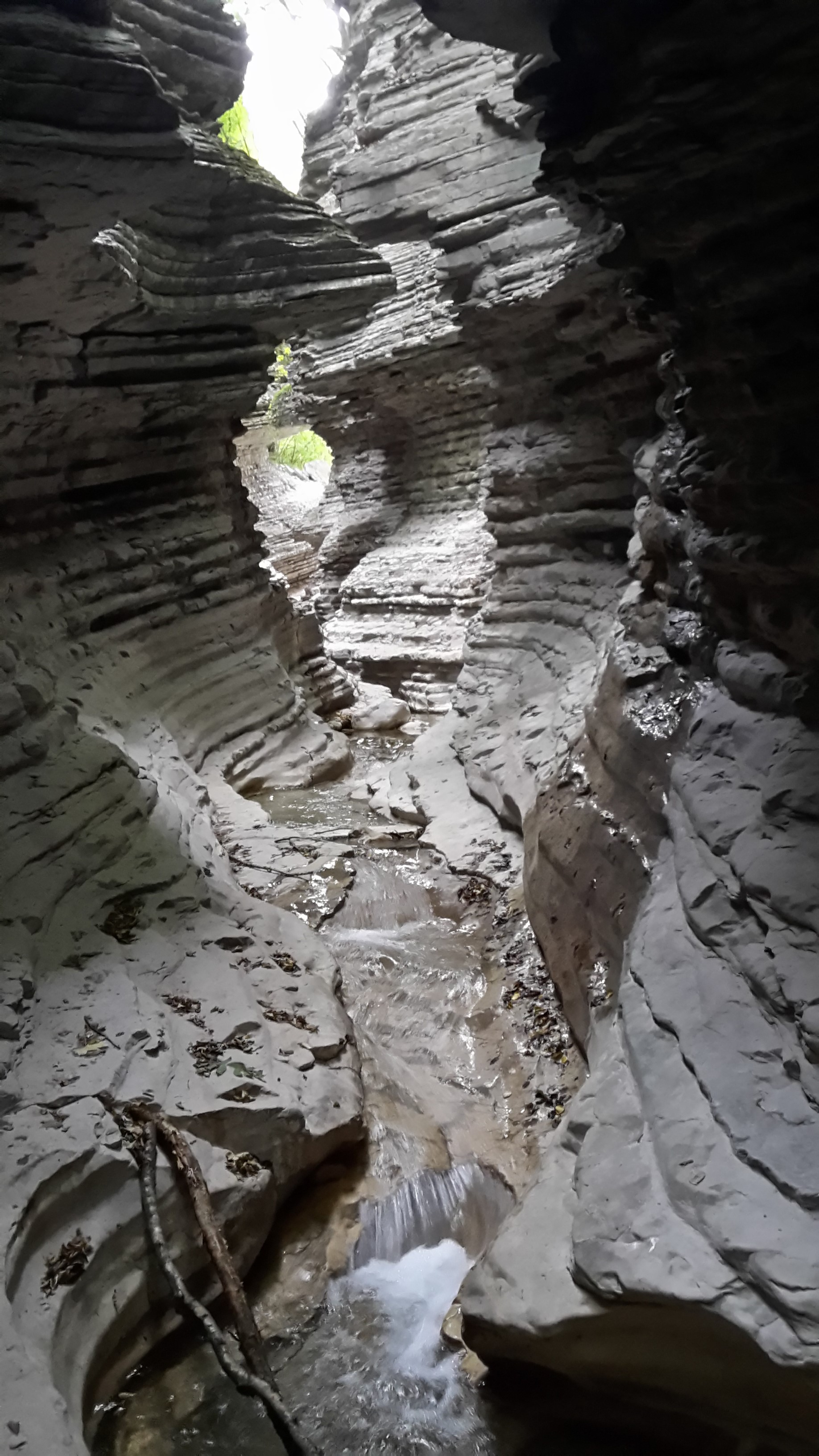
the "Brent dell'Art"

== Twin towns ==
Trichiana is twinned with:

- Saubens, France
