= Tione di Trento =

- Comune
- Comune di Tione di Trento
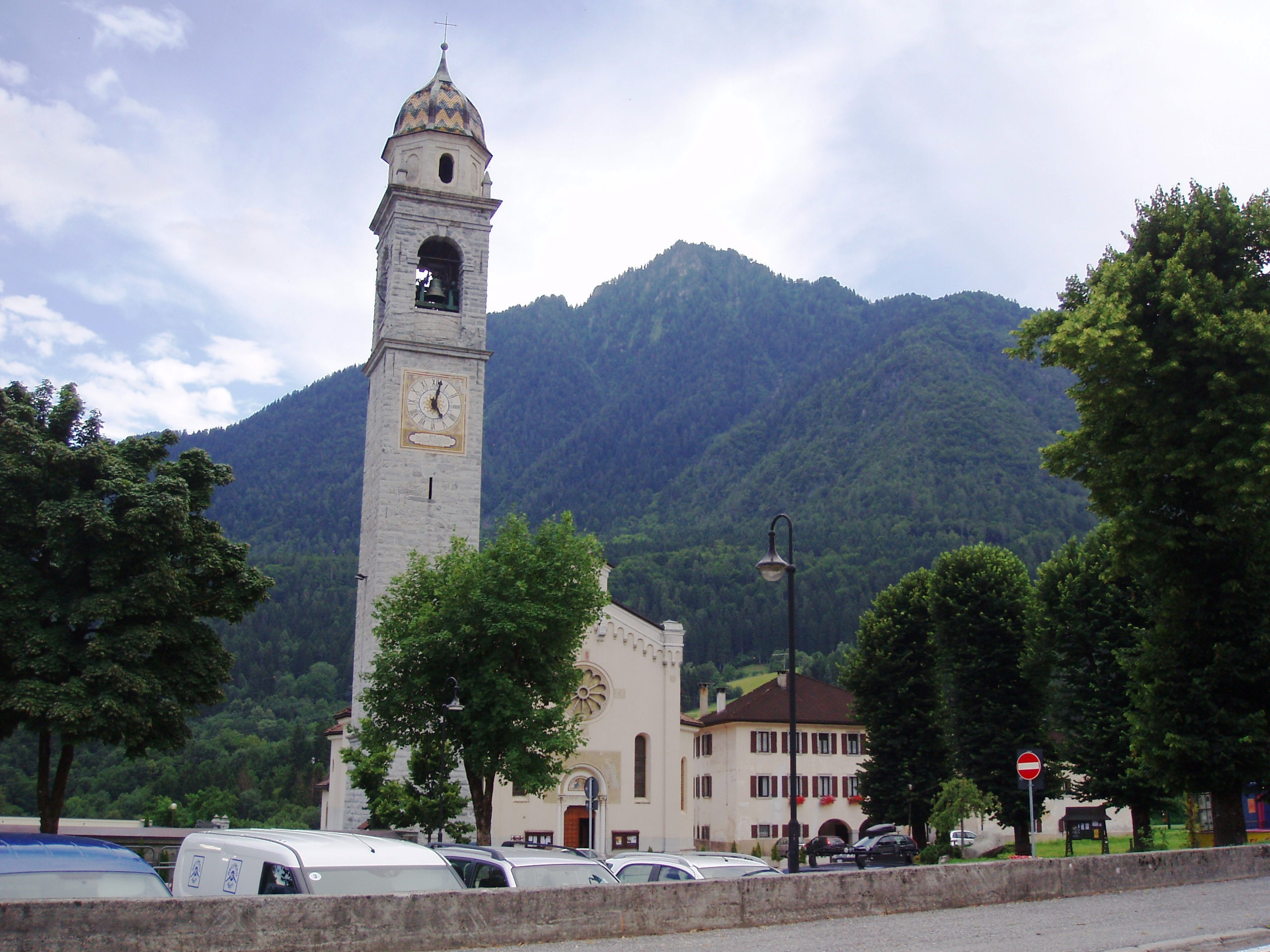
- Tione di Trento - church

- Location within Italy Location within Trentino-Alto Adige/Südtirol
- Coordinates: 46°2′N 10°44′E
- Country: Italy
- Region: Trentino-Alto Adige/Südtirol
- Province: Trentino (TN)
- Frazioni: Saone

Government
  - Mayor: Eugenio Antolini

Area
  - Total: 33.45 km^{2} (12.92 sq mi)
- Elevation: 600 m (2,000 ft)

Population (31 December 2015)
  - Total: 3,635
  - Density: 108.7/km^{2} (281.5/sq mi)
- Demonym: Tionesi
- Time zone: UTC+1 (CET)
  - Summer (DST): UTC+2 (CEST)
- Postal code: 38079
- Dialing code: 0465
- Website: Official website

Tione di Trento (Trentino: Tiòn; Local dialect: Tió) is a comune (municipality) in Trentino in the northern Italian region Trentino-Alto Adige/Südtirol, located about 30 kilometres (19 mi) west of Trento.

Tione di Trento borders the following, municipalities: Ragoli, Villa Rendena, Preore, Comano Terme, Bleggio Superiore, Bondo, Bolbeno, Breguzzo, Zuclo, Roncone, Lardaro, Ledro, and Pieve di Bono.

It is a centre for production of candles.

== History ==
Until 1918, Tione was part of the Austrian monarchy (Austria side after the compromise of 1867), head of the district of the same name, one of the 21 Bezirkshauptmannschaften in the Tyrol province. A post-office was opened in 1851.

== Notable persons ==
- Francesca Gino, disgraced Italian-American behavioral scientist
