= Bleggio Inferiore =

- Frazione
- Location of Bleggio Inferiore in Italy
- Coordinates: 46°2′N 10°52′E
- Country: Italy
- Region: Trentino-Alto Adige/Südtirol
- Province: Trentino (TN)
- Comune: Comano Terme

Area (referred to the former municipality)
  - Total: 26.2 km^{2} (10.1 sq mi)
- Elevation: 400 m (1,300 ft)

Population (Dec. 2004)
  - Total: 1,097
  - Density: 41.9/km^{2} (108/sq mi)
- Time zone: UTC+1 (CET)
  - Summer (DST): UTC+2 (CEST)
- Postal code: 38071
- Dialing code: 0465
- Website: Official website

Bleggio Inferiore (Blec’ de Sota in local dialect) was a comune (municipality) in Trentino in the Italian region Trentino-Alto Adige/Südtirol. On January 1, 2010, it merged, with Lomaso, in the new municipality of Comano Terme.

== Geography ==
The former municipality contained the frazioni (subdivisions, mainly villages and hamlets) Santa Croce, Duvredo, Vergonzo, Tignerone, Cillà, Villa, Sesto, Biè, Comighello, Bono, Cares, Ponte Arche (partly in Stenico, united with the urban area of Bleggio Inferiore), and Val d'Algone.

Bleggio Inferiore, located about 20 km (12 mi) west of Trento, bordered with the following municipalities: Ragoli, Giustino, Massimeno, San Lorenzo in Banale, Bocenago, Stenico, Dorsino, Lomaso, Tione di Trento, Bleggio Superiore, and Fiavè.

== Demographic evolution ==
As of 31 December 2004, it had a population of 1,097 and an area of 26.2 km^{2} (10.1 sq mi).

Historical population

Year	Pop.	±%
1861	?	—
1871	?	—
1881	?	—
1901	?	—
1911	?	—

Year	Pop.	±%
1921	925	—
1931	863	−6.7%
1936	821	−4.9%
1951	899	+9.5%
1961	931	+3.6%

Year	Pop.	±%
1971	953	+2.4%
1981	968	+1.6%
1991	1,008	+4.1%
2001	1,084	+7.5%

Source: Data from ISTAT
