= Lomaso =

- Frazione
- Location of Lomaso in Italy
- Coordinates: 46°1′N 10°52′E
- Country: Italy
- Region: Trentino-Alto Adige/Südtirol
- Province: Trentino (TN)
- Comune: Comano Terme

Area (referred to the former municipality)
  - Total: 41.5 km^{2} (16.0 sq mi)
- Elevation: 500 m (1,600 ft)

Population (Dec. 2004)
  - Total: 1,482
  - Density: 35.7/km^{2} (92.5/sq mi)
- Time zone: UTC+1 (CET)
  - Summer (DST): UTC+2 (CEST)
- Postal code: 38070
- Dialing code: 0465

Lomaso (Lomàs in local dialect) was a comune (municipality) in Trentino in the Italian region Trentino-Alto Adige/Südtirol. On January 1, 2010 it merged, with Bleggio Inferiore, in the new municipality of Comano Terme.

== Geography ==
The former municipality contained the frazioni (subdivisions, mainly villages and hamlets) of Campo Lomaso (municipal seat, also named Lomaso), Comano, Dasindo, Godenzo, Lundo, Poia, Ponte Arche and Vigo Lomaso.

Lomaso, located about 20 km (12 mi) southwest of Trento, bordered with the following municipalities: San Lorenzo in Banale, Stenico, Dorsino, Calavino, Bleggio Inferiore, Dro, Fiavè, Arco and Tenno.

== Demographic evolution ==
As of 31 December 2004, it had a population of 1,482 and an area of 41.5 km^{2} (16.0 sq mi).

Historical population

Year	Pop.	±%
1861	?	—
1871	?	—
1881	?	—
1901	?	—
1911	?	—

Year	Pop.	±%
1921	2,030	—
1931	1,813	−10.7%
1936	1,614	−11.0%
1951	1,649	+2.2%
1961	1,558	−5.5%

Year	Pop.	±%
1971	1,388	−10.9%
1981	1,297	−6.6%
1991	1,233	−4.9%
2001	1,408	+14.2%

Source: Data from ISTAT
