= Bleggio =

Bleggio may refer to 2 Italian places of Trentino-Alto Adige:

- Bleggio Superiore, a municipality of the province of Trento
- Bleggio Inferiore, a former municipality of the province of Trento (from 2010 part of Comano Terme).
