= Comano =

Comano may refer to:

- Comano Terme, a comune in Trentino, Italy
- Comano, Ticino, a commune in Ticino, Switzerland
- Comano, Tuscany, a commune in Massa-Carrara, Italy
- Comano, a frazione of the former commune of Lomaso, in Trentino, northern Italy (now part of Comano Terme)
