= Stenico =

- Comune
- Comune di Stenico
- Location within Italy Location within Trentino-Alto Adige/Südtirol
- Coordinates: 46°3′N 10°51′E
- Country: Italy
- Region: Trentino-Alto Adige/Südtirol
- Province: Trentino (TN)
- Frazioni: Ponte Arche

Government
  - Mayor: Mirko Failoni

Area
  - Total: 49.8 km^{2} (19.2 sq mi)

Population (Dec. 2004)
  - Total: 1,119
  - Density: 22.5/km^{2} (58.2/sq mi)
- Time zone: UTC+1 (CET)
  - Summer (DST): UTC+2 (CEST)
- Postal code: 38070
- Dialing code: 0465
- Website: Official website

Stenico (Sténech in local dialect) is a comune (municipality) in Trentino in the northern Italian region Trentino-Alto Adige/Südtirol, located about 20 kilometres (12 mi) west of Trento. As of 31 December 2004, it had a population of 1,119 and an area of 49.8 square kilometres (19.2 mi^{2}).

Stenico borders the following municipalities: Pinzolo, Ragoli, Giustino, San Lorenzo in Banale, Bocenago, Dorsino, Montagne and Comano Terme.

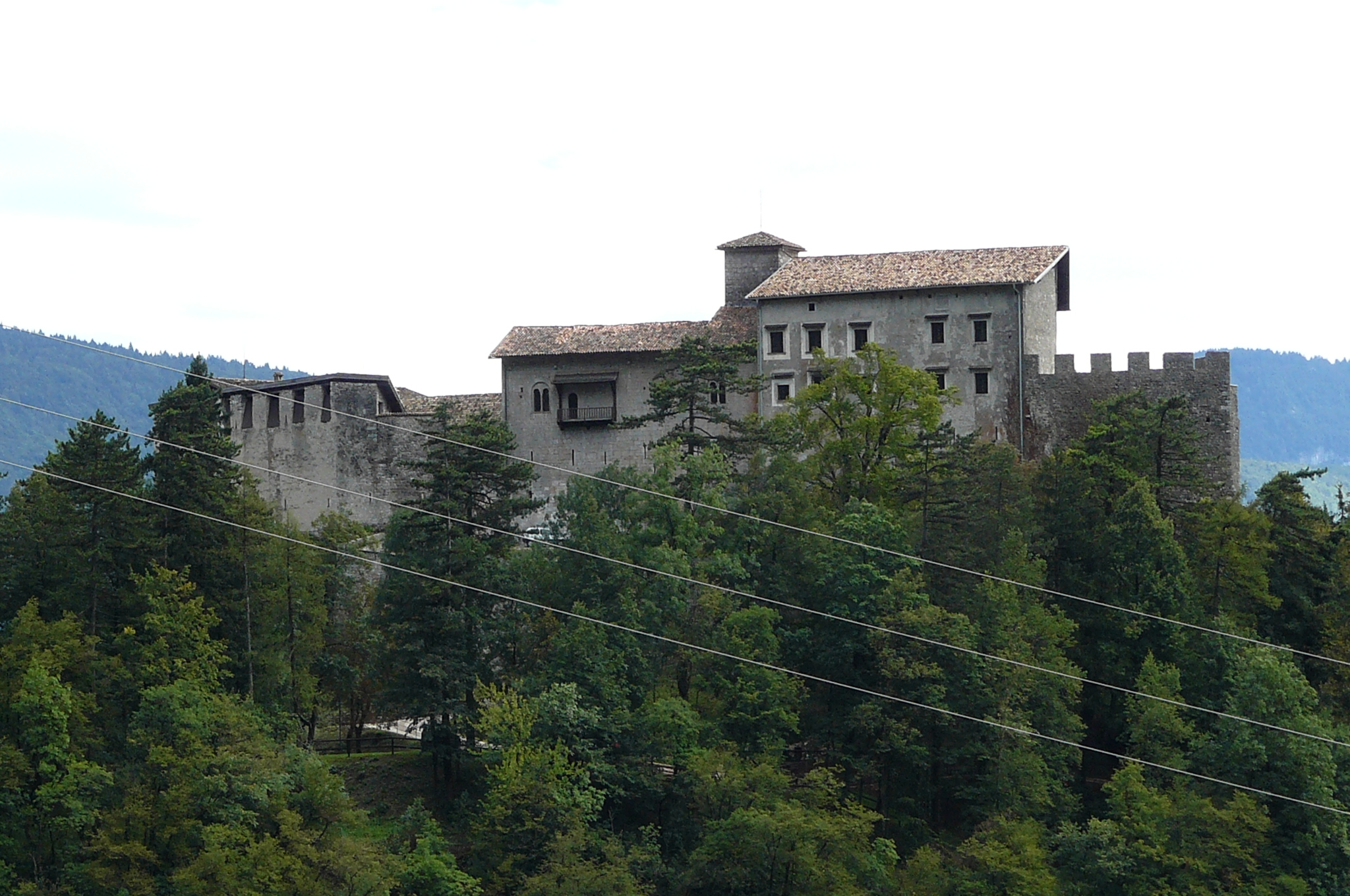
Stenico Castle

== Demographic evolution ==
Historical population

Year	Pop.	±%
1861	?	—
1871	?	—
1881	?	—
1901	?	—
1911	?	—

Year	Pop.	±%
1921	2,609	—
1931	1,828	−29.9%
1936	1,580	−13.6%
1951	1,554	−1.6%
1961	1,326	−14.7%

Year	Pop.	±%
1971	1,052	−20.7%
1981	1,024	−2.7%
1991	969	−5.4%
2001	1,061	+9.5%

Source: Data from ISTAT

== See also ==
- Ponte Arche
- Bleggio Inferiore
- Lomaso
