= 2022 Giro Donne =

Italian cycling race

2022 UCI Women's World Tour, race 15 of 23
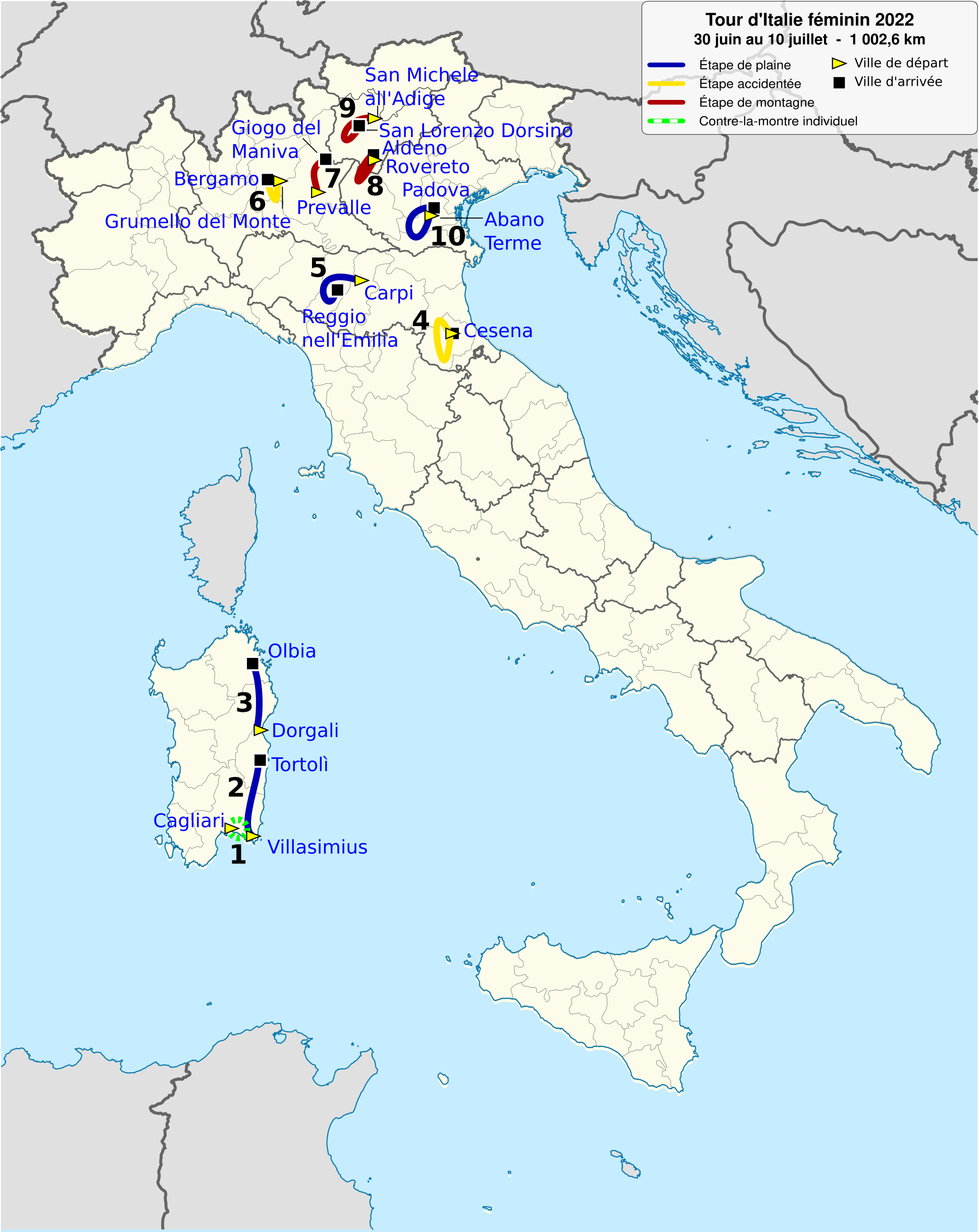

Race details
- Dates: 30 June – 10 July 2022
- Stages: 10
- Distance: 1,007.2 km (625.8 mi)
- Winning time: 27h 07' 26"

Results
Jersey awarded to the overall winner	Winner	Annemiek van Vleuten (NED)	(Movistar Team)
	Second	Marta Cavalli (ITA)	(FDJ Nouvelle-Aquitaine Futuroscope)
	Third	Mavi García (ESP)	(UAE Team ADQ)
Jersey awarded to the points classification winner	Points	Annemiek van Vleuten (NED)	(Movistar Team)
Jersey awarded to the mountains classification winner	Mountains	Kristen Faulkner (USA)	(Team BikeExchange–Jayco)
Jersey awarded to the young rider classification winner	Young rider	Niamh Fisher-Black (NZL)	(SD Worx)
Jersey awarded to the team classification winner	Team	FDJ Nouvelle-Aquitaine Futuroscope	

The 2022 Giro Donne was the 33rd edition of the Giro Donne women's road cycling stage race. The race started on 30 June 2022 and finished on 10 July 2022. As the longest and one of the most prestigious races on the women's calendar, the event included ten stages covering over 1,000 kilometres (620 mi) across northern Italy.

The race was won by Annemiek van Vleuten for the third time.

== Teams ==
Thirteen UCI Women's WorldTeams, along with eleven UCI Women's Continental Teams, participated in the race.

UCI Women's WorldTeams

- Canyon//SRAM
- EF Education–Tibco–SVB
- FDJ Nouvelle-Aquitaine Futuroscope
- Liv Racing Xstra
- Movistar Team
- Roland Cogeas Edelweiss Squad
- SD Worx
- Team BikeExchange–Jayco
- Team DSM
- Team Jumbo–Visma
- Trek–Segafredo
- UAE Team ADQ
- Uno-X Pro Cycling Team

UCI Women's Continental Teams

- Aromitalia–Basso Bikes–Vaiano
- Bepink
- Bizkaia–Durango
- Ceratizit–WNT Pro Cycling
- Cofidis
- Colombia Tierra de Atletas–GW–Shimano
- Isolmant–Premac–Vittoria
- Servetto–Makhymo–Beltrami TSA
- Team Mendelspeck
- Top Girls Fassa Bortolo
- Valcar–Travel & Service

== Route ==
Stage characteristics and winners
Stage	Date	Course	Distance	Type	Winner
P	30 June	Cagliari	4.7 km (2.9 mi)	Individual time trial	Kristen Faulkner (USA)
1	1 July	Villasimius to Tortolì	106.5 km (66.2 mi)	Flat stage	Elisa Balsamo (ITA)
2	2 July	Cala Gonone to Olbia	113.4 km (70.5 mi)	Flat stage	Marianne Vos (NED)
	3 July	Cesena	Rest day		
3	4 July	Cesena to Cesena	120.9 km (75.1 mi)	Hilly stage	Annemiek van Vleuten (NED)
4	5 July	Carpi to Reggio Emilia	126.1 km (78.4 mi)	Hilly stage	Elisa Balsamo (ITA)
5	6 July	Sarnico to Bergamo	114.7 km (71.3 mi)	Hilly stage	Marianne Vos (NED)
6	7 July	Prevalle to Passo del Maniva	112.9 km (70.2 mi)	Mountain stage	Juliette Labous (FRA)
7	8 July	Rovereto to Aldeno	104.7 km (65.1 mi)	Medium-mountain stage	Annemiek van Vleuten (NED)
8	9 July	San Michele All'Adige to San Lorenzo	112.8 km (70.1 mi)	Mountain stage	Kristen Faulkner (USA)
9	10 July	Abano Terme to Padova	90.5 km (56.2 mi)	Hilly stage	Chiara Consonni (ITA)
Total			1,007.2 km (625.8 mi)		

== Classification leadership table ==
Classification leadership by stage
Stage	Winner	General classification	Points classification	Mountains classification	Young rider classification	Italian rider classification	Team classification
P	Kristen Faulkner	Kristen Faulkner	Kristen Faulkner	Not awarded	Blanka Vas	Elisa Balsamo	Trek–Segafredo
1	Elisa Balsamo	Elisa Balsamo	Elisa Balsamo	Franziska Brauße	Marta Jaskulska	Elisa Balsamo	Trek–Segafredo
2	Marianne Vos	Elisa Balsamo	Elisa Balsamo	Franziska Brauße	Franziska Koch	Elisa Balsamo	Trek–Segafredo
3	Annemiek van Vleuten	Annemiek van Vleuten	Elisa Balsamo	Mavi García	Niamh Fisher-Black	Marta Cavalli	FDJ Nouvelle-Aquitaine Futuroscope
4	Elisa Balsamo	Annemiek van Vleuten	Elisa Balsamo	Mavi García	Niamh Fisher-Black	Marta Cavalli	FDJ Nouvelle-Aquitaine Futuroscope
5	Marianne Vos	Annemiek van Vleuten	Marianne Vos	Elise Chabbey	Niamh Fisher-Black	Marta Cavalli	FDJ Nouvelle-Aquitaine Futuroscope
6	Juliette Labous	Annemiek van Vleuten	Elisa Balsamo	Elise Chabbey	Niamh Fisher-Black	Marta Cavalli	FDJ Nouvelle-Aquitaine Futuroscope
7	Annemiek van Vleuten	Annemiek van Vleuten	Annemiek van Vleuten	Elise Chabbey	Niamh Fisher-Black	Marta Cavalli	FDJ Nouvelle-Aquitaine Futuroscope
8	Kristen Faulkner	Annemiek van Vleuten	Annemiek van Vleuten	Kristen Faulkner	Niamh Fisher-Black	Marta Cavalli	FDJ Nouvelle-Aquitaine Futuroscope
9	Chiara Consonni	Annemiek van Vleuten	Annemiek van Vleuten	Kristen Faulkner	Niamh Fisher-Black	Marta Cavalli	FDJ Nouvelle-Aquitaine Futuroscope
Final		Annemiek van Vleuten	Annemiek van Vleuten	Kristen Faulkner	Niamh Fisher-Black	Marta Cavalli	FDJ Nouvelle-Aquitaine Futuroscope

== Classification standings ==
Legend
Denotes the winner of the general classification	Denotes the winner of the mountains classification
Denotes the winner of the points classification	Denotes the winner of the young rider classification
Denotes the winner of the Italian rider classification	Denotes the winner of the team classification

=== General classification ===
Final general classification (1–10)
Rank	Rider	Team	Time
1	Annemiek van Vleuten (NED)	Movistar Team	27h 07' 26"
2	Marta Cavalli (ITA)	FDJ Nouvelle-Aquitaine Futuroscope	+ 1' 52"
3	Mavi García (ESP)	UAE Team ADQ	+ 5' 56"
4	Elisa Longo Borghini (ITA)	Trek–Segafredo	+ 6' 45"
5	Niamh Fisher-Black (NZL)	SD Worx	+ 11' 12"
6	Cecilie Uttrup Ludwig (DEN)	FDJ Nouvelle-Aquitaine Futuroscope	+ 12' 14"
7	Silvia Persico (ITA)	Valcar–Travel & Service	+ 13' 08"
8	Erica Magnaldi (ITA)	UAE Team ADQ	+ 15' 13"
9	Juliette Labous (FRA)	Team DSM	+ 15' 49"
10	Neve Bradbury (AUS)	Canyon//SRAM	+ 17' 29"

=== Points classification ===
Final points classification (1–10)
Rank	Rider	Team	Points
1	Annemiek van Vleuten (NED)	Movistar Team	60
2	Elisa Balsamo (ITA)	Trek–Segafredo	50
3	Kristen Faulkner (USA)	Team BikeExchange–Jayco	46
4	Marta Cavalli (ITA)	FDJ Nouvelle-Aquitaine Futuroscope	46
5	Elisa Longo Borghini (ITA)	Trek–Segafredo	39
6	Lotte Kopecky (BEL)	SD Worx	36
7	Charlotte Kool (NED)	Team DSM	34
8	Mavi García (ESP)	UAE Team ADQ	32
9	Chiara Consonni (ITA)	Valcar–Travel & Service	30
10	Rachele Barbieri (ITA)	Liv Racing Xstra	29

=== Mountains classification ===
Final mountains classification (1–10)
Rank	Rider	Team	Points
1	Kristen Faulkner (USA)	Team BikeExchange–Jayco	56
2	Elise Chabbey (SUI)	Canyon//SRAM	46
3	Annemiek van Vleuten (NED)	Movistar Team	43
4	Marta Cavalli (ITA)	FDJ Nouvelle-Aquitaine Futuroscope	33
5	Mavi García (ESP)	UAE Team ADQ	30
6	Gaia Realini (ITA)	Isolmant–Premac–Vittoria	29
7	Elisa Longo Borghini (ITA)	Trek–Segafredo	25
8	Juliette Labous (FRA)	Team DSM	15
9	Évita Muzic (FRA)	FDJ Nouvelle-Aquitaine Futuroscope	15
10	Cecilie Uttrup Ludwig (DEN)	FDJ Nouvelle-Aquitaine Futuroscope	13

=== Young rider classification ===
Final young rider classification (1–10)
Rank	Rider	Team	Time
1	Niamh Fisher-Black (NZL)	SD Worx	27h 18' 38"
2	Neve Bradbury (AUS)	Canyon//SRAM	+ 6' 17"
3	Gaia Realini (ITA)	Isolmant–Premac–Vittoria	+ 12' 26"
4	Petra Stiasny (SUI)	Roland Cogeas Edelweiss Squad	+ 33' 05"
5	Magdeleine Vallieres (CAN)	EF Education–Tibco–SVB	+ 1h 05' 02"
6	Alice Palazzi (ITA)	Top Girls Fassa Bortolo	+ 1h 07' 12"
7	Angela Oro (ITA)	Team Mendelspeck	+ 1h 10' 32"
8	Cristina Tonetti (ITA)	Top Girls Fassa Bortolo	+ 1h 10' 34"
9	Blanka Vas (HUN)	SD Worx	+ 1h 15' 55"
10	Olivia Onesti (FRA)	Cofidis	+ 1h 19' 35"

=== Italian rider classification ===
Final Italian rider classification (1–10)
Rank	Rider	Team	Time
1	Marta Cavalli (ITA)	FDJ Nouvelle-Aquitaine Futuroscope	27h 09' 18"
2	Elisa Longo Borghini (ITA)	Trek–Segafredo	+ 4' 53"
3	Silvia Persico (ITA)	Valcar–Travel & Service	+ 11' 16"
4	Erica Magnaldi (ITA)	UAE Team ADQ	+ 13' 21"
5	Gaia Realini (ITA)	Isolmant–Premac–Vittoria	+ 21' 46"
6	Greta Marturano (ITA)	Top Girls Fassa Bortolo	+ 42' 30"
7	Alessia Vigilia (ITA)	Top Girls Fassa Bortolo	+ 50' 13"
8	Alice Maria Arzuffi (ITA)	Valcar–Travel & Service	+ 57' 03"
9	Eva Maria Gatscher (ITA)	Team Mendelspeck	+ 59' 54"
10	Beatrice Rossato (ITA)	Isolmant–Premac–Vittoria	+ 1h 06' 06"

=== Team classification ===
Final team classification (1–10)
Rank	Team	Time
1	FDJ Nouvelle-Aquitaine Futuroscope	81h 55' 26"
2	Canyon//SRAM	+ 32' 54"
3	Trek–Segafredo	+ 46' 18"
4	UAE Team ADQ	+ 56' 09"
5	Movistar Team	+ 1h 34' 01"
6	Team BikeExchange–Jayco	+ 1h 46' 31"
7	EF Education–Tibco–SVB	+ 1h 49' 37"
8	Valcar–Travel & Service	+ 1h 59' 08"
9	SD Worx	+ 2h 01' 32"
10	Top Girls Fassa Bortolo	+ 2h 11' 21"

== See also ==
- 2022 in women's road cycling
