= Alex Marini =

Italian politician

Alex Marini (born December 21, 1977, in Trentino Italy) is an Italian politician. He was elected as a member of the Regional Council of Trentino-Alto Adige/Südtirol and as a member of the Council of the Italian Autonomous Province of Trento for the Five Star Movement Trentino, local section of the Five Star Movement Italian political party, in 2018.

== Biography ==
Born in Tione di Trento, his father was a public servant while his mother handled the family's newsstand. He lived the first part of his life in Darzo. Marini graduated in 1996 with a degree in accounting from the Istituto Luigi Einaudi located in Tione di Trento. Subsequently, worked as a bank teller for the Banca Valsabbina and later, in 1999 he enrolled at the University of Trento where he got his degree in Sociology in the year 2004 with a thesis on energy consumption and social awareness.

== Political activity ==
Marini was the first to sign and create the 'Citizens’ bill on the regulation of public participation', Citizens’ bills, referendums, as well as amendments to the electoral law of the Autonomous Province of Trento (Italy). The bill was submitted in 2012 and resulted in citizens’ decision to participate directly in public life, using one of the available instruments existing in the provincial legal system. On the citizens’ bill the Venice Commission issued a specific opinion.

Along with 20 other people, on 12 January 2015, Marini founded the association of social promotion Più Democrazia in Trentino (More Democracy in Trentino) and was subsequently nominated as its first president, a position he maintained until 2017.

From 2013 till 2018 Alex Marini worked as a collaborator for the secretary of the Bureau of the Italian Chamber of Deputies, Riccardo Fraccaro.

Recently, he was the protagonist of a judicial dispute in civil court with the president of the Museum of Modern and Contemporary Art of Trento and Rovereto (MART), Vittorio Sgarbi, in which he came out as the first instance. Sgarbi sought compensation from Marini for defamation. Marini had criticized the political appointment of a condemned man for the head of a public body (parliamentarian, president of the MART, and active mayor) and the Court of Macerata overturned and sentenced Sgarbi to pay Marini. Sgarbi has appealed and filed a complaint at the Chamber of Deputies.

Marini is tirelessly working for the activity of the protection of civil and political rights, internet rights, transparency and environmental policies. In 2021 he has been appointed as member of the Conference of the advisors for the Trentinians living abroad
