= 2022 Giro Donne, Stage 1 to Stage 9 =

Cycling race stages

The 2022 Giro Donne was the 33rd edition of the Giro Donne women's road cycling stage race. The race started on 30 June 2022 and finished on 10 July 2022. As the longest and one of the most prestigious races on the women's calendar, the event included ten stages covering over 1,000 kilometres (620 mi) across northern Italy.

== Overview ==
Stage characteristics and winners
Stage	Date	Course	Distance	Type	Winner
P	30 June	Cagliari	4.7 km (2.9 mi)	Individual time trial	Kristen Faulkner (USA)
1	1 July	Villasimius to Tortolì	106.5 km (66.2 mi)	Flat stage	Elisa Balsamo (ITA)
2	2 July	Cala Gonone to Olbia	113.4 km (70.5 mi)	Flat stage	Marianne Vos (NED)
	3 July	Cesena	Rest day		
3	4 July	Cesena to Cesena	120.9 km (75.1 mi)	Hilly stage	Annemiek van Vleuten (NED)
4	5 July	Carpi to Reggio Emilia	126.1 km (78.4 mi)	Hilly stage	Elisa Balsamo (ITA)
5	6 July	Sarnico to Bergamo	114.7 km (71.3 mi)	Hilly stage	Marianne Vos (NED)
6	7 July	Prevalle to Passo del Maniva	112.9 km (70.2 mi)	Mountain stage	Juliette Labous (FRA)
7	8 July	Rovereto to Aldeno	104.7 km (65.1 mi)	Medium-mountain stage	Annemiek van Vleuten (NED)
8	9 July	San Michele All'Adige to San Lorenzo	112.8 km (70.1 mi)	Mountain stage	Kristen Faulkner (USA)
9	10 July	Abano Terme to Padova	90.5 km (56.2 mi)	Hilly stage	Chiara Consonni (ITA)
Total			1,007.2 km (625.8 mi)		

== Classification standings ==
Legend
Denotes the leader of the general classification	Denotes the leader of the mountains classification
Denotes the leader of the points classification	Denotes the leader of the young rider classification
Denotes the leader of the Italian rider classification	Denotes the leader of the team classification

== Prologue ==
30 June 2022 — Cagliari, 4.7 km (2.9 mi) (ITT)

Prologue Result
Rank	Rider	Team	Time
1	Kristen Faulkner (USA)	Team BikeExchange–Jayco	5' 46"
2	Georgia Baker (AUS)	Team BikeExchange–Jayco	+ 4"
3	Elisa Balsamo (ITA)	Trek–Segafredo	+ 6"
4	Lotte Kopecky (BEL)	SD Worx	+ 6"
5	Elisa Longo Borghini (ITA)	Trek–Segafredo	+ 9"
6	Annemiek van Vleuten (NED)	Movistar Team	+ 10"
7	Lucinda Brand (NED)	Trek–Segafredo	+ 10"
8	Riejanne Markus (NED)	Team Jumbo–Visma	+ 11"
9	Leah Thomas (USA)	Trek–Segafredo	+ 12"
10	Anouska Koster (NED)	Team Jumbo–Visma	+ 12"

General classification after Prologue
Rank	Rider	Team	Time
1	Kristen Faulkner (USA)	Team BikeExchange–Jayco	5' 46"
2	Georgia Baker (AUS)	Team BikeExchange–Jayco	+ 4"
3	Elisa Balsamo (ITA)	Trek–Segafredo	+ 6"
4	Lotte Kopecky (BEL)	SD Worx	+ 6"
5	Elisa Longo Borghini (ITA)	Trek–Segafredo	+ 9"
6	Annemiek van Vleuten (NED)	Movistar Team	+ 10"
7	Lucinda Brand (NED)	Trek–Segafredo	+ 10"
8	Riejanne Markus (NED)	Team Jumbo–Visma	+ 11"
9	Leah Thomas (USA)	Trek–Segafredo	+ 12"
10	Anouska Koster (NED)	Team Jumbo–Visma	+ 12"

== Stage 1 ==
1 July 2022 — Villasimius to Tortolì, 106.5 km (66.2 mi)

Stage 1 Result
Rank	Rider	Team	Time
1	Elisa Balsamo (ITA)	Trek–Segafredo	2h 39' 13"
2	Marianne Vos (NED)	Team Jumbo–Visma	+ 0"
3	Charlotte Kool (NED)	Team DSM	+ 0"
4	Lotte Kopecky (BEL)	SD Worx	+ 0"
5	Chiara Consonni (ITA)	Valcar–Travel & Service	+ 0"
6	Rachele Barbieri (ITA)	Liv Racing Xstra	+ 0"
7	Georgia Baker (AUS)	Team BikeExchange–Jayco	+ 0"
8	Marta Bastianelli (ITA)	UAE Team ADQ	+ 0"
9	Silvia Zanardi (ITA)	Bepink	+ 0"
10	Lea Lin Teutenberg (GER)	Ceratizit–WNT Pro Cycling	+ 0"

General classification after Stage 1
Rank	Rider	Team	Time
1	Elisa Balsamo (ITA)	Trek–Segafredo	2h 44' 54"
2	Kristen Faulkner (USA)	Team BikeExchange–Jayco	+ 4"
3	Georgia Baker (AUS)	Team BikeExchange–Jayco	+ 8"
4	Lotte Kopecky (BEL)	SD Worx	+ 10"
5	Marianne Vos (NED)	Team Jumbo–Visma	+ 12"
6	Elisa Longo Borghini (ITA)	Trek–Segafredo	+ 13"
7	Annemiek van Vleuten (NED)	Movistar Team	+ 14"
8	Lucinda Brand (NED)	Trek–Segafredo	+ 14"
9	Riejanne Markus (NED)	Team Jumbo–Visma	+ 15"
10	Leah Thomas (USA)	Trek–Segafredo	+ 16"

== Stage 2 ==
2 July 2022 — Cala Gonone to Olbia, 113.4 km (70.5 mi)

Stage 2 Result
Rank	Rider	Team	Time
1	Marianne Vos (NED)	Team Jumbo–Visma	2h 48' 22"
2	Charlotte Kool (NED)	Team DSM	+ 0"
3	Elisa Balsamo (ITA)	Trek–Segafredo	+ 0"
4	Rachele Barbieri (ITA)	Liv Racing Xstra	+ 0"
5	Sofia Bertizzolo (ITA)	UAE Team ADQ	+ 0"
6	Lotte Kopecky (BEL)	SD Worx	+ 0"
7	Emma Norsgaard (DEN)	Movistar Team	+ 0"
8	Silvia Zanardi (ITA)	Bepink	+ 0"
9	Georgia Baker (AUS)	Team BikeExchange–Jayco	+ 0"
10	Chiara Consonni (ITA)	Valcar–Travel & Service	+ 0"

General classification after Stage 2
Rank	Rider	Team	Time
1	Elisa Balsamo (ITA)	Trek–Segafredo	5h 33' 12"
2	Marianne Vos (NED)	Team Jumbo–Visma	+ 6"
3	Georgia Baker (AUS)	Team BikeExchange–Jayco	+ 12"
4	Kristen Faulkner (USA)	Team BikeExchange–Jayco	+ 14"
5	Lotte Kopecky (BEL)	SD Worx	+ 14"
6	Elisa Longo Borghini (ITA)	Trek–Segafredo	+ 17"
7	Annemiek van Vleuten (NED)	Movistar Team	+ 18"
8	Charlotte Kool (NED)	Team DSM	+ 19"
9	Emma Norsgaard (DEN)	Movistar Team	+ 20"
10	Lucinda Brand (NED)	Trek–Segafredo	+ 24"

== Rest day ==
3 July 2022 — Cesena

== Stage 3 ==
4 July 2022 — Cesena to Cesena, 120.9 km (75.1 mi)

Stage 3 Result
Rank	Rider	Team	Time
1	Annemiek van Vleuten (NED)	Movistar Team	3h 13' 13"
2	Mavi García (ESP)	UAE Team ADQ	+ 1"
3	Marta Cavalli (ITA)	FDJ Nouvelle-Aquitaine Futuroscope	+ 43"
4	Silvia Persico (ITA)	Valcar–Travel & Service	+ 4' 51"
5	Amanda Spratt (AUS)	Team BikeExchange–Jayco	+ 4' 51"
6	Elisa Longo Borghini (ITA)	Trek–Segafredo	+ 4' 51"
7	Elise Chabbey (SUI)	Canyon//SRAM	+ 4' 51"
8	Erica Magnaldi (ITA)	UAE Team ADQ	+ 4' 51"
9	Cecilie Uttrup Ludwig (DEN)	FDJ Nouvelle-Aquitaine Futuroscope	+ 4' 51"
10	Niamh Fisher-Black (NZL)	SD Worx	+ 4' 51"

General classification after Stage 3
Rank	Rider	Team	Time
1	Annemiek van Vleuten (NED)	Movistar Team	8h 46' 33"
2	Mavi García (ESP)	UAE Team ADQ	+ 25"
3	Marta Cavalli (ITA)	FDJ Nouvelle-Aquitaine Futuroscope	+ 57"
4	Elisa Longo Borghini (ITA)	Trek–Segafredo	+ 5' 00"
5	Cecilie Uttrup Ludwig (DEN)	FDJ Nouvelle-Aquitaine Futuroscope	+ 5' 13"
6	Amanda Spratt (AUS)	Team BikeExchange–Jayco	+ 5' 14"
7	Elise Chabbey (SUI)	Canyon//SRAM	+ 5' 21"
8	Niamh Fisher-Black (NZL)	SD Worx	+ 5' 28"
9	Évita Muzic (FRA)	FDJ Nouvelle-Aquitaine Futuroscope	+ 5' 29"
10	Silvia Persico (ITA)	Valcar–Travel & Service	+ 5' 29"

== Stage 4 ==
5 July 2022 — Carpi to Reggio Emilia, 126.1 km (78.4 mi)

Stage 4 Result
Rank	Rider	Team	Time
1	Elisa Balsamo (ITA)	Trek–Segafredo	3h 05' 02"
2	Charlotte Kool (NED)	Team DSM	+ 0"
3	Marianne Vos (NED)	Team Jumbo–Visma	+ 0"
4	Chiara Consonni (ITA)	Valcar–Travel & Service	+ 0"
5	Marta Bastianelli (ITA)	UAE Team ADQ	+ 0"
6	Arlenis Sierra (CUB)	Movistar Team	+ 0"
7	Rachele Barbieri (ITA)	Liv Racing Xstra	+ 0"
8	Clara Copponi (FRA)	FDJ Nouvelle-Aquitaine Futuroscope	+ 0"
9	Emanuela Zanetti (ITA)	Isolmant–Premac–Vittoria	+ 0"
10	Lea Lin Teutenberg (GER)	Ceratizit–WNT Pro Cycling	+ 0"

General classification after Stage 4
Rank	Rider	Team	Time
1	Annemiek van Vleuten (NED)	Movistar Team	11h 51' 35"
2	Mavi García (ESP)	UAE Team ADQ	+ 25"
3	Marta Cavalli (ITA)	FDJ Nouvelle-Aquitaine Futuroscope	+ 57"
4	Elisa Longo Borghini (ITA)	Trek–Segafredo	+ 5' 00"
5	Cecilie Uttrup Ludwig (DEN)	FDJ Nouvelle-Aquitaine Futuroscope	+ 5' 13"
6	Amanda Spratt (AUS)	Team BikeExchange–Jayco	+ 5' 14"
7	Elise Chabbey (SUI)	Canyon//SRAM	+ 5' 21"
8	Niamh Fisher-Black (NZL)	SD Worx	+ 5' 28"
9	Évita Muzic (FRA)	FDJ Nouvelle-Aquitaine Futuroscope	+ 5' 29"
10	Silvia Persico (ITA)	Valcar–Travel & Service	+ 5' 29"

== Stage 5 ==
6 July 2022 — Sarnico to Bergamo, 114.7 km (71.3 mi)

Stage 5 Result
Rank	Rider	Team	Time
1	Marianne Vos (NED)	Team Jumbo–Visma	2h 58' 30"
2	Lotte Kopecky (BEL)	SD Worx	+ 0"
3	Silvia Persico (ITA)	Valcar–Travel & Service	+ 0"
4	Kristen Faulkner (USA)	Team BikeExchange–Jayco	+ 0"
5	Amanda Spratt (AUS)	Team BikeExchange–Jayco	+ 0"
6	Annemiek van Vleuten (NED)	Movistar Team	+ 0"
7	Marta Cavalli (ITA)	FDJ Nouvelle-Aquitaine Futuroscope	+ 0"
8	Mavi García (ESP)	UAE Team ADQ	+ 0"
9	Elisa Longo Borghini (ITA)	Trek–Segafredo	+ 0"
10	Cecilie Uttrup Ludwig (DEN)	FDJ Nouvelle-Aquitaine Futuroscope	+ 0"

General classification after Stage 5
Rank	Rider	Team	Time
1	Annemiek van Vleuten (NED)	Movistar Team	14h 50' 05"
2	Mavi García (ESP)	UAE Team ADQ	+ 25"
3	Marta Cavalli (ITA)	FDJ Nouvelle-Aquitaine Futuroscope	+ 54"
4	Elisa Longo Borghini (ITA)	Trek–Segafredo	+ 5' 00"
5	Cecilie Uttrup Ludwig (DEN)	FDJ Nouvelle-Aquitaine Futuroscope	+ 5' 13"
6	Amanda Spratt (AUS)	Team BikeExchange–Jayco	+ 5' 14"
7	Silvia Persico (ITA)	Valcar–Travel & Service	+ 5' 25"
8	Niamh Fisher-Black (NZL)	SD Worx	+ 5' 28"
9	Elise Chabbey (SUI)	Canyon//SRAM	+ 5' 45"
10	Évita Muzic (FRA)	FDJ Nouvelle-Aquitaine Futuroscope	+ 5' 55"

== Stage 6 ==
7 July 2022 — Prevalle to Passo del Maniva, 112.9 km (70.2 mi)

Stage 6 Result
Rank	Rider	Team	Time
1	Juliette Labous (FRA)	Team DSM	3h 22' 36"
2	Annemiek van Vleuten (NED)	Movistar Team	+ 1' 37"
3	Mavi García (ESP)	UAE Team ADQ	+ 1' 41"
4	Marta Cavalli (ITA)	FDJ Nouvelle-Aquitaine Futuroscope	+ 1' 47"
5	Elisa Longo Borghini (ITA)	Trek–Segafredo	+ 1' 50"
6	Niamh Fisher-Black (NZL)	SD Worx	+ 1' 57"
7	Gaia Realini (ITA)	Isolmant–Premac–Vittoria	+ 2' 13"
8	Amanda Spratt (AUS)	Team BikeExchange–Jayco	+ 2' 29"
9	Clara Koppenburg (GER)	Cofidis	+ 2' 37"
10	Silvia Persico (ITA)	Valcar–Travel & Service	+ 2' 39"

General classification after Stage 6
Rank	Rider	Team	Time
1	Annemiek van Vleuten (NED)	Movistar Team	18h 14' 12"
2	Mavi García (ESP)	UAE Team ADQ	+ 31"
3	Marta Cavalli (ITA)	FDJ Nouvelle-Aquitaine Futuroscope	+ 1' 10"
4	Elisa Longo Borghini (ITA)	Trek–Segafredo	+ 5' 19"
5	Niamh Fisher-Black (NZL)	SD Worx	+ 5' 54"
6	Amanda Spratt (AUS)	Team BikeExchange–Jayco	+ 6' 12"
7	Cecilie Uttrup Ludwig (DEN)	FDJ Nouvelle-Aquitaine Futuroscope	+ 6' 22"
8	Silvia Persico (ITA)	Valcar–Travel & Service	+ 6' 33"
9	Erica Magnaldi (ITA)	UAE Team ADQ	+ 8' 25"
10	Elise Chabbey (SUI)	Canyon//SRAM	+ 8' 30"

== Stage 7 ==
8 July 2022 — Rovereto to Aldeno, 104.7 km (65.1 mi)

Stage 7 Result
Rank	Rider	Team	Time
1	Annemiek van Vleuten (NED)	Movistar Team	3h 03' 16"
2	Marta Cavalli (ITA)	FDJ Nouvelle-Aquitaine Futuroscope	+ 59"
3	Elisa Longo Borghini (ITA)	Trek–Segafredo	+ 1' 38"
4	Kristen Faulkner (USA)	Team BikeExchange–Jayco	+ 1' 45"
5	Niamh Fisher-Black (NZL)	SD Worx	+ 3' 01"
6	Mavi García (ESP)	UAE Team ADQ	+ 3' 01"
7	Juliette Labous (FRA)	Team DSM	+ 3' 01"
8	Cecilie Uttrup Ludwig (DEN)	FDJ Nouvelle-Aquitaine Futuroscope	+ 3' 01"
9	Neve Bradbury (AUS)	Canyon//SRAM	+ 3' 10"
10	Silvia Persico (ITA)	Valcar–Travel & Service	+ 3' 59"

General classification after Stage 7
Rank	Rider	Team	Time
1	Annemiek van Vleuten (NED)	Movistar Team	21h 17' 18"
2	Marta Cavalli (ITA)	FDJ Nouvelle-Aquitaine Futuroscope	+ 2' 13"
3	Mavi García (ESP)	UAE Team ADQ	+ 3' 42"
4	Elisa Longo Borghini (ITA)	Trek–Segafredo	+ 7' 03"
5	Niamh Fisher-Black (NZL)	SD Worx	+ 9' 05"
6	Cecilie Uttrup Ludwig (DEN)	FDJ Nouvelle-Aquitaine Futuroscope	+ 9' 33"
7	Silvia Persico (ITA)	Valcar–Travel & Service	+ 10' 41"
8	Erica Magnaldi (ITA)	UAE Team ADQ	+ 12' 35"
9	Juliette Labous (FRA)	Team DSM	+ 13' 25"
10	Elise Chabbey (SUI)	Canyon//SRAM	+ 13' 29"

== Stage 8 ==
9 July 2022 — San Michele All'Adige to San Lorenzo, 112.8 km (70.1 mi)

Stage 8 Result
Rank	Rider	Team	Time
1	Kristen Faulkner (USA)	Team BikeExchange–Jayco	3h 36' 36"
2	Marta Cavalli (ITA)	FDJ Nouvelle-Aquitaine Futuroscope	+ 59"
3	Elisa Longo Borghini (ITA)	Trek–Segafredo	+ 1' 14"
4	Annemiek van Vleuten (NED)	Movistar Team	+ 1' 14"
5	Gaia Realini (ITA)	Isolmant–Premac–Vittoria	+ 1' 44"
6	Niamh Fisher-Black (NZL)	SD Worx	+ 3' 35"
7	Silvia Persico (ITA)	Valcar–Travel & Service	+ 3' 35"
8	Juliette Labous (FRA)	Team DSM	+ 3' 38"
9	Mavi García (ESP)	UAE Team ADQ	+ 3' 42"
10	Erica Magnaldi (ITA)	UAE Team ADQ	+ 4' 06"

General classification after Stage 8
Rank	Rider	Team	Time
1	Annemiek van Vleuten (NED)	Movistar Team	24h 55' 08"
2	Marta Cavalli (ITA)	FDJ Nouvelle-Aquitaine Futuroscope	+ 1' 52"
3	Mavi García (ESP)	UAE Team ADQ	+ 6' 10"
4	Elisa Longo Borghini (ITA)	Trek–Segafredo	+ 6' 59"
5	Niamh Fisher-Black (NZL)	SD Worx	+ 11' 26"
6	Cecilie Uttrup Ludwig (DEN)	FDJ Nouvelle-Aquitaine Futuroscope	+ 12' 28"
7	Silvia Persico (ITA)	Valcar–Travel & Service	+ 13' 22"
8	Erica Magnaldi (ITA)	UAE Team ADQ	+ 15' 27"
9	Juliette Labous (FRA)	Team DSM	+ 15' 49"
10	Neve Bradbury (AUS)	Canyon//SRAM	+ 17' 43"

== Stage 9 ==
10 July 2022 — Abano Terme to Padova, 90.5 km (56.2 mi)

Stage 9 Result
Rank	Rider	Team	Time
1	Chiara Consonni (ITA)	Valcar–Travel & Service	2h 12' 04"
2	Rachele Barbieri (ITA)	Liv Racing Xstra	+ 0"
3	Emma Norsgaard (DEN)	Movistar Team	+ 0"
4	Elisa Balsamo (ITA)	Trek–Segafredo	+ 0"
5	Sofia Bertizzolo (ITA)	UAE Team ADQ	+ 0"
6	Karlijn Swinkels (NED)	Team Jumbo–Visma	+ 0"
7	Clara Copponi (FRA)	FDJ Nouvelle-Aquitaine Futuroscope	+ 0"
8	Lotte Kopecky (BEL)	SD Worx	+ 0"
9	Martina Fidanza (ITA)	Ceratizit–WNT Pro Cycling	+ 0"
10	Teniel Campbell (TRI)	Team BikeExchange–Jayco	+ 0"

General classification after Stage 9
Rank	Rider	Team	Time
1	Annemiek van Vleuten (NED)	Movistar Team	27h 07' 26"
2	Marta Cavalli (ITA)	FDJ Nouvelle-Aquitaine Futuroscope	+ 1' 52"
3	Mavi García (ESP)	UAE Team ADQ	+ 5' 56"
4	Elisa Longo Borghini (ITA)	Trek–Segafredo	+ 6' 45"
5	Niamh Fisher-Black (NZL)	SD Worx	+ 11' 12"
6	Cecilie Uttrup Ludwig (DEN)	FDJ Nouvelle-Aquitaine Futuroscope	+ 12' 14"
7	Silvia Persico (ITA)	Valcar–Travel & Service	+ 13' 08"
8	Erica Magnaldi (ITA)	UAE Team ADQ	+ 15' 13"
9	Juliette Labous (FRA)	Team DSM	+ 15' 49"
10	Neve Bradbury (AUS)	Canyon//SRAM	+ 17' 29"
