= Fabian Barcata =

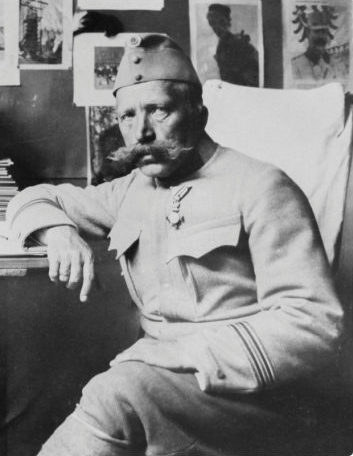
Fabian Barcata (before 1919)

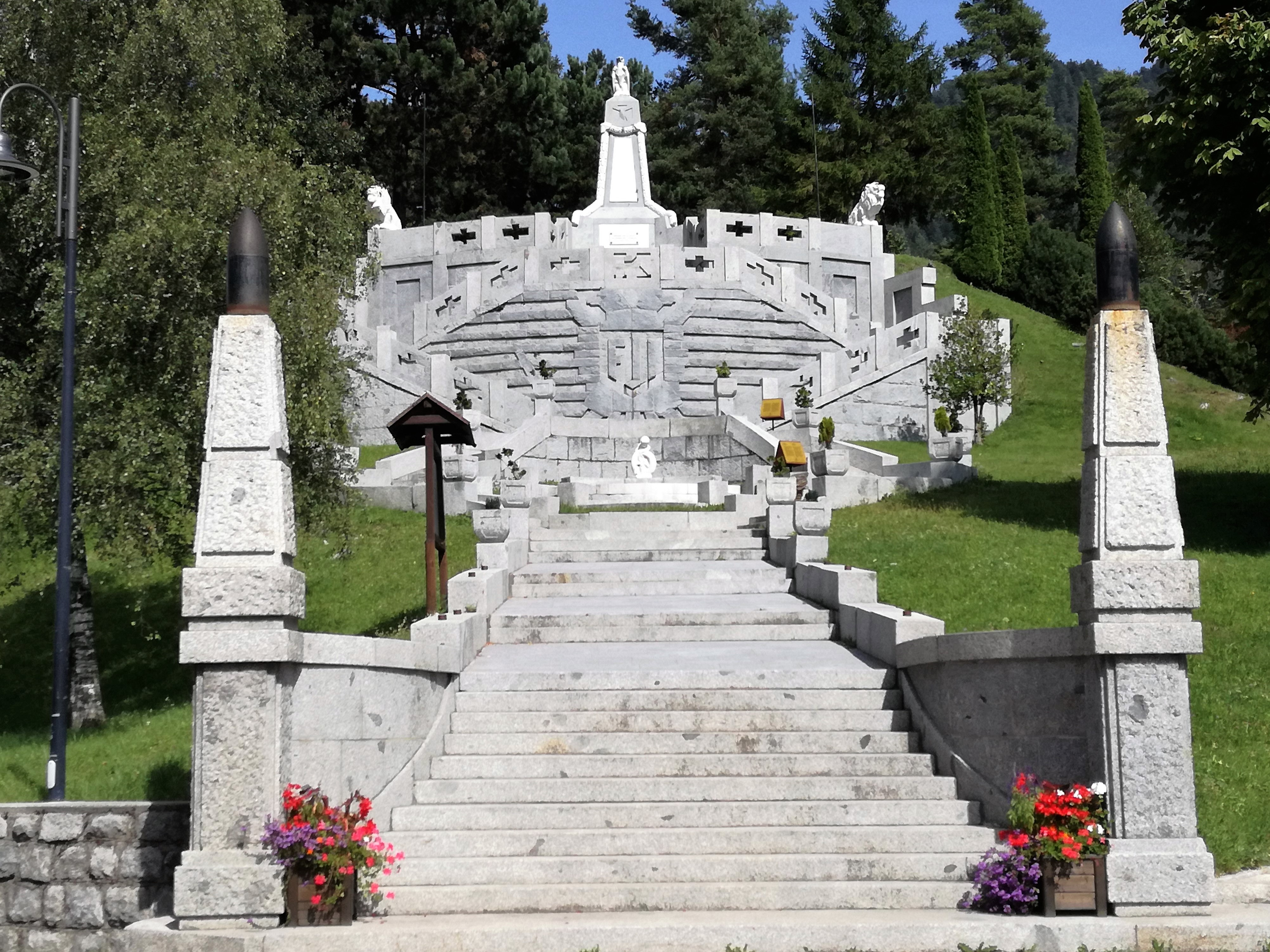
The Austro-Hungarian Cemetery of Bondo designed by Fabian Barcata

Fabian Barcatta (Valfloriana, March 29, 1868 - Schwaz, November 25, 1954) was an Italian designer, religious and missionary.

== Biography ==
Born as Maurizio Emmanuele Barcatta to Antonio and Catterina Genetin, he was baptized in the parish of San Floriano di Valfloriana in Val di Fiemme on March 31, 1868.

On 3 May 1891 he was ordained a priest in the Cathedral of Bressanone.

In November 1893 he took care of the formation of Albanian clerics at Maria Lankowitz in Styria, while the following year he moved to the capital, Graz, where he worked as a high school teacher.

From 1895 to 1897 he worked as a curate in Albania. In 1897 he returned to Austria, first to Innichen (1898) and then to Graz (1899). In 1899 he left again as a missionary for Albania, where he remained until 1907, when he fell ill with malaria and decided to return to his native province.

In 1915, having become military chaplain, he was in charge of the design and construction of the Austro-Hungarian monumental cemetery of Bondo, a work for which he is mainly remembered. In 1917 the monumental fountain was inaugurated in the square dedicated to Francesco Giuseppe in Vezzano designed by father Fabian Barcatta.

He died of illness in Schwaz in Tyrol in 1954.

== Works ==
- Lule. Vätersatzung und Väterbrauch in den albanischen Bergen. Eine wahre Geschichte aus Albaniens jüngster Vergangenheit.
- Lule: një histori e vërtetë prej kohës së kalueme të Shqipnisë (Albanian translation by Karl Gurakuqi)

== Bibliography ==
- Dante Ongari (1990). "Padre Fabian Barcata artista di guerra in Giudicarie : vita ed opere del frate". SAT. Sezioni Pieve di Bono e Tione.
- Robert Elsie (2012). "A Biographical Dictionary of Albanian History". Bloomsbury Academic. I.B.Tauris. pp. 29–30. ISBN 9781780764313.
- Michela Favero. Il progetto di restauro del monumento e del cimitero austro-ungarico di Bondo (PDF).
- Marco Ischia; Mario Moser (2013). ""I nostri eroi - Unsere Helden"". Rovereto. Egon. pp. 152–154. ISBN 9788896215494.
