= Borgo Lares =

- Comune
- Comune di Borgo Lares
- Location within Italy Location within Trentino-Alto Adige/Südtirol
- Coordinates: 46°2′7″N 10°45′8″E
- Country: Italy
- Region: Trentino-Alto Adige/Südtirol
- Province: Trentino (TN)
- Frazioni: Bolbeno, Zuclo

Government
  - Mayor: Giorgio Marchetti

Area
  - Total: 22.62 km^{2} (8.73 sq mi)

Population (2026)
  - Total: 734
  - Density: 32.4/km^{2} (84.0/sq mi)
- Time zone: UTC+1 (CET)
  - Summer (DST): UTC+2 (CEST)
- Postal code: 38079
- Dialing code: 0465
- Website: Official website

Borgo Lares is a comune (municipality) in the Province of Trentino in the Italian region Trentino-Alto Adige/Südtirol.

It was established on 1 January 2016 by the merger of the municipalities of Bolbeno and Zuclo.
