= Aleardo Aleardi =

Italian poet (1812–1878)

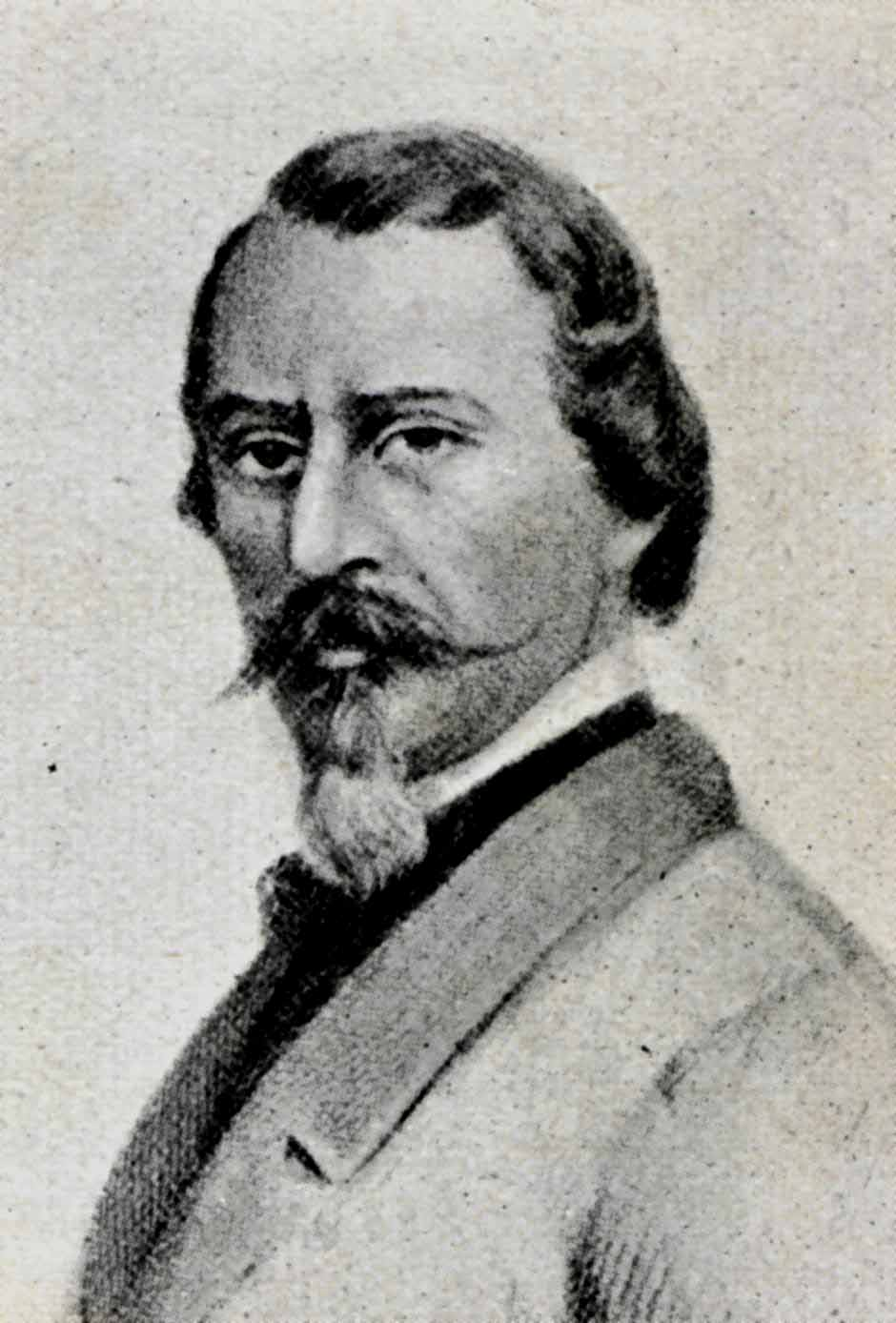
Aleardo Aleardi

Aleardo Aleardi (14 November 1812 – 17 July 1878), born Gaetano Maria, was an Italian poet who belonged to the so-called Neo-romanticists.

== Biography ==
Aleardo was born in Verona in 1812 to an aristocratic family. His parents were Count Giorgio Aleardi and Maria Canali. He graduated in law at the University of Padua, where he met Giovanni Prati. He took an active part in the political events of the Risorgimento, particularly in the revolution of 1848, when he was sent by the Republic of San Marco to Paris in order to obtain the support of the French troops against the Austrians. His first poetic attempts follow in the footsteps of Manzoni, especially the historical narrative poem Arnalda di Roca (1844). This poem had the historical protagonist of a young woman who dies defending her honor: here we find the search for theatrical effects and dramatic color that is typical of the entire oeuvre of Aleardi. His first success was achieved in 1846 with the two Letters to Mary, in verse, in which the poet addresses a friend proposing a platonic love. It was an opportunity to express his belief in the immortality of the soul and pour out his emotional suffering in a spirit of romanticism.

His extraordinarily successful career and popularity are due to his combination of idyllic and sentimental tones with historical and patriotic themes, as in Il monte Circello (1856), Le antiche città italiane marinare e commercianti (1856), and Raffaello e la Fornarina (1858). In the 1850s he was imprisoned twice by the Austrians: at Mantua in 1852 and at Josephstadt in Bohemia in 1859.

After the unification of Italy, he became a member of parliament. In 1873 he was made a senator. He later became a professor of aesthetics at the Accademia di Belle Arti in Florence, where he died in 1878.
