= Zuclo =

Zuclo was a comune (municipality) in Trentino in the northern Italian region Trentino-Alto Adige/Südtirol, located about 30 kilometres (19 mi) west of Trento. It was merged with Bolbeno to form a new municipality, Borgo Lares.

It is known for its church, San Martino. It has about 365 inhabitants.
