= Ragoli =

- Comune
- Comune di Ragoli
- Location within Italy Location within Trentino-Alto Adige/Südtirol
- Coordinates: 46°3′N 10°47′E
- Country: Italy
- Region: Trentino-Alto Adige/Südtirol
- Province: Trentino (TN)

Area
  - Total: 64.9 km^{2} (25.1 sq mi)

Population (Dec. 2004)
  - Total: 781
  - Density: 12.0/km^{2} (31.2/sq mi)
- Demonym: Ragolesi
- Time zone: UTC+1 (CET)
  - Summer (DST): UTC+2 (CEST)
- Postal code: 38070
- Dialing code: 0465

Ragoli (Ràgoi in local dialect) was a comune (municipality) in Trentino in the northern Italian region Trentino-Alto Adige/Südtirol, located about 25 kilometres (16 mi) west of Trento. As of 31 December 2004, it had a population of 781 and an area of 64.9 square kilometres (25.1 mi^{2}). It was merged with Montagne and Preore on January 1, 2016, to form a new municipality, Tre Ville.

Ragoli borders the following municipalities: Tuenno, Dimaro, Pinzolo, Molveno, San Lorenzo in Banale, Stenico, Montagne, Preore, Tione di Trento and Comano Terme.

Ragoli is one of the richest municipalities in Trentino Alto Adige and is well known for his culture, food and rich festivals.

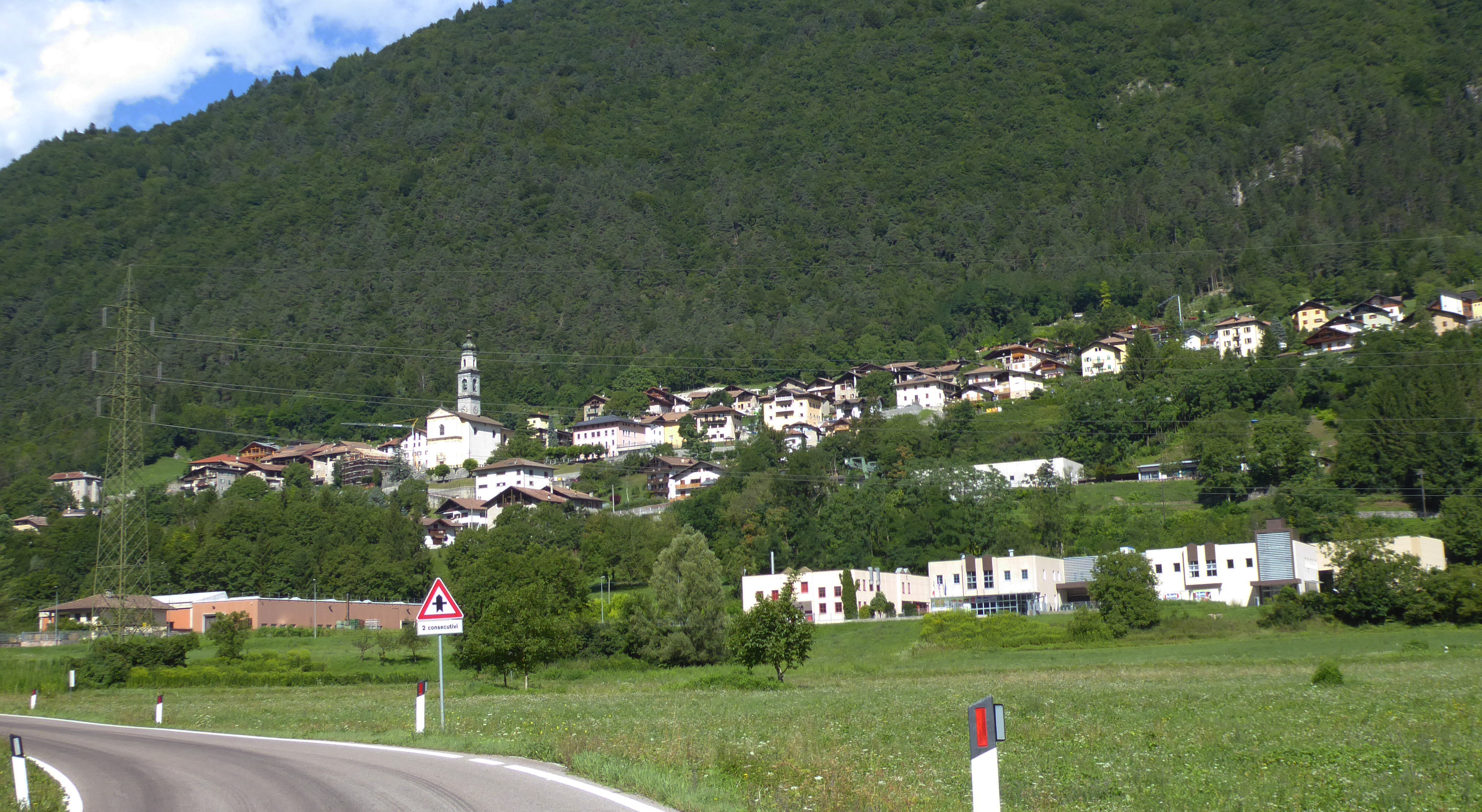
Ragoli in 2021

== Demographic evolution ==
Historical population

Year	Pop.	±%
1861	?	—
1871	?	—
1881	?	—
1901	?	—
1911	?	—

Year	Pop.	±%
1921	961	—
1931	869	−9.6%
1936	671	−22.8%
1951	723	+7.7%
1961	734	+1.5%

Year	Pop.	±%
1971	784	+6.8%
1981	778	−0.8%
1991	749	−3.7%
2001	766	+2.3%

Source: Data from ISTAT
