= Fort Corno =

Fort in Trentino, Italy

Coordinates: 45.9621°N 10.6477°E

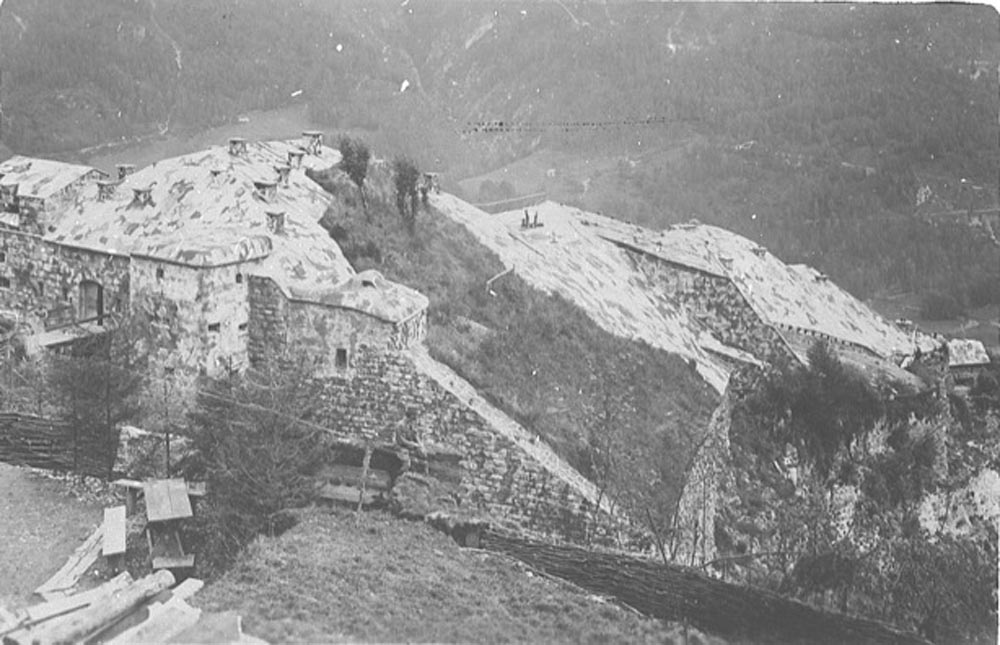
photo of the fort in 1914

Fort Corno (Fort Horn) is an Austro-Hungarian fort built in Praso, Northern Italy. Corno was built between 1890 and 1892, and is grouped into a type of fort called Gebrigsfort (Mountain Fort). The fort was equipped with an observation turret on the North-West corner. Together with Forts Carriola and Larino, Corno blocked the whole Chiese (Church) valley. All 3 were connected by a maze of trenches and field positions. Corno's armament was 6 12 cm guns, 3 10 cm guns, and 3-5 machine guns in armored turrets.

The fort has a volume of 18,000 cubic metres, comprises 53 rooms, and extends over six levels, following the contours of the terrain and the profile of the rocky spur on which it was built.

During the Second World War, the fort was used as a machine-gun post.

== Pre-WWI to the end of WWII ==
The fort was modernized in 1909 and 1910. Despite this renovation, the fort was disarmed with the outbreak of war with Italy in May 1915. Its guns were moved to field positions nearby. The fort was heavily shelled by the Italians and was later damaged by salvagers after the war. The fort was once again pressed into use when WWII rolled around, being a machine gun post.

== Post-world wars ==
In 2008, work restoring the fort started, with the local municipality getting grants for more restoration work in 2012. The fort is now connected to Fort Larino by a walking trail.

== Armament ==
The fort was armed with six M/80-type guns on fortress mountings and three howitzers for close-range fire. It was also equipped with rotating steel cupolas and gun armor, which were later removed.

The fort was disarmed before the outbreak of the First World War, as its armament had become obsolete and outdated. The guns were transferred to an underground emplacement at Peschiera, the name of the mountain overlooking the fort.

== See also ==
- Austro-Hungarian fortifications on the Italian border
- Fort Carriola
- Fort Larino
