= Comano Terme =

- Comune
- Comune di Comano Terme
- Location within Italy Location within Trentino-Alto Adige/Südtirol
- Coordinates: 46°10′N 10°52′E
- Country: Italy
- Region: Trentino-Alto Adige/Südtirol
- Province: Trentino (TN)
- Frazioni: Biè, Bleggio Inferiore (seat), Bono, Cares, Cillà, Comano, Comighella, Dasindo, Duvredo, Godenzo, Lomaso, Lundo, Poia, Ponte Arche, Santa Croce, Sesto, Tignerone, Val d'Algone, Vergonzo, Vigo Lomaso, Villa

Government
  - Mayor: Fabio Zambotti

Area
  - Total: 67 km^{2} (26 sq mi)
- Elevation: 400 m (1,300 ft)

Population (2026)
  - Total: 3,059
  - Density: 46/km^{2} (120/sq mi)
- Demonym(s): Comanesi (Bleggiani and Lomasini)
- Time zone: UTC+1 (CET)
  - Summer (DST): UTC+2 (CEST)
- Postal code: 38077 - 38071
- Dialing code: 0465
- Website: Official website

Comano Terme (Comàn in local dialect) is an Italian comune (municipality) of the province of Trentino in northern Italy. It was created on 1 January 2010 by the union of the former comuni of Bleggio Inferiore and Lomaso.

== History ==
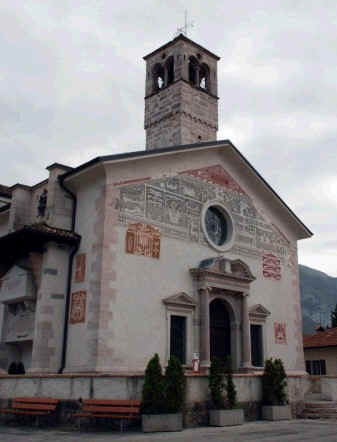
Dasindo church

The municipality was created after a referendum, called on 27 September 2009, in both the comuni. Its name derives from the spa (terme) located in the village of Comano (German: Komaun), formerly part of Lomaso (Lomaß).

== Geography ==
The municipality counts the civil parishes (frazioni) of Biè, Bleggio Inferiore (the municipal seat), Bono, Cares, Cillà, Comano, Comighella, Dasindo, Duvredo, Godenzo, Lomaso (also named Campo Lomaso), Lundo, Poia, Ponte Arche (partly located in Stenico), Santa Croce, Sesto, Tignerone, Val d'Algone, Vergonzo, Vigo Lomaso, Villa

Comano Terme borders with the municipalities of Arco, Bleggio Superiore, Bocenago, Dorsino, Dro, Fiavè, Giustino, Massimeno, Ragoli, San Lorenzo in Banale, Stenico, Tenno and Tione di Trento.

== Main sights ==
- Spa of Comano
- Campo Castle
- Restor Castle
- Spine Castle

== Personalities ==
- Lorenzo Guetti
- Giovanni Prati
