= Giovanni Prati =

Poet and politician from Italy

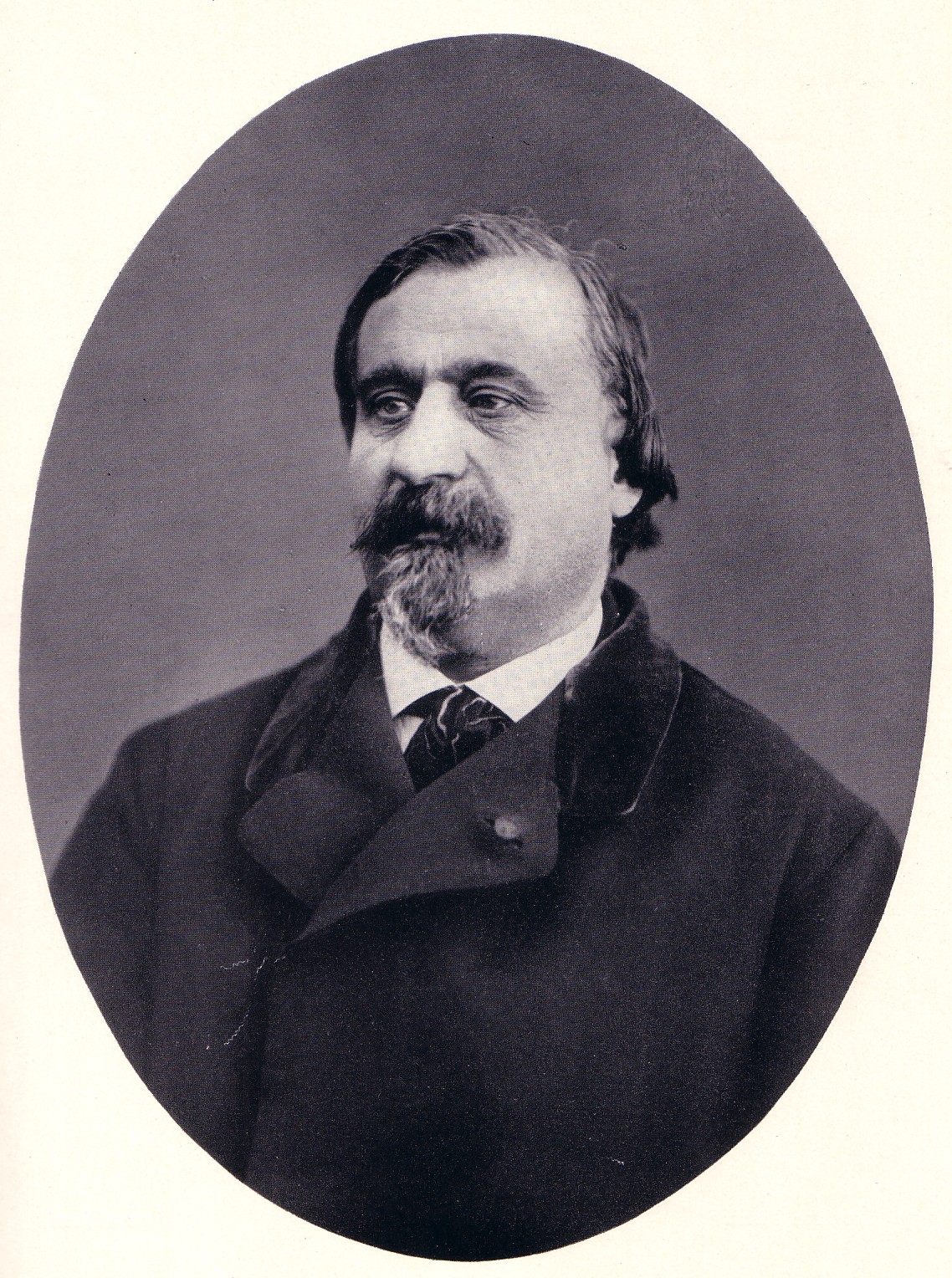
Giovanni Prati

Giovanni Prati (27 January 1815 – 9 May 1884) was an Italian poet and politician.

== Biography ==
Prati was born in Comano Terme, province of Trento, then part of the Austrian Empire. He studied law at the university of Padua. He was a close friend of Aleardo Aleardi, with whom his name is commonly linked.

Prati established his reputation when he moved to Milan in 1840 and wrote Edmenegarda (1841). This novella in versi about bourgeois passion and hypocrisy, had great success with the public, though critics were less convinced. Subsequent narrative and philosophical poems such as Satana e le Grazie (1855) and Armando (1864) also had a mixed reception on account of the schematic treatment of their characters' psychology. He became an important figure of Milanese culture and attended the salon hosted by countess Clara Maffei.

His various collections of lyric poetry derived their appeal mainly from their sentimental qualities, although the charm and grace of some poems looks forwards to Pascoli, and the late Psiche (1876) and Iside (1878) show a new realism of approach.

Prati was a convinced monarchist—leading to embittered relations with republicans like Daniele Manin in Venice—and wrote various celebratory poems for the House of Savoy. His devotion to the royal house of Savoy brought him into trouble with several leading figures of the Risorgimento, to the point that Guerrazzi expelled him from the Tuscan Republic in 1849 for his praise of Carlo Alberto.

Prati became official royal historian in Turin in the early 1860s and began a successful political career. In 1862 he was elected a deputy to the Italian parliament, and in 1876 a senator. He died in Rome on 9 May 1884. Prati was a prolific poet, his volumes of verse ranging from his romantic narrative Ermenegarda (1841) to the lyrics collected in Psiche (1875) and Iside (1878). His Opere vane were published in five volumes in 1875, and a selection in one volume in 1892.
