= Sella Giudicarie =

- Comune
- Comune di Sella Giudicarie
- Location within Italy Location within Trentino-Alto Adige/Südtirol
- Coordinates: 45°59′03″N 10°40′10″E
- Country: Italy
- Region: Trentino-Alto Adige/Südtirol
- Province: Trento (TN)
- Frazioni: Bondo, Breguzzo, Lardaro, Roncone (communal seat)

Government
  - Mayor: Franco Bazzoli

Area
  - Total: 85.76 km^{2} (33.11 sq mi)
- Elevation: 842 m (2,762 ft)

Population (31 August 2017)
  - Total: 2,956
  - Density: 34.47/km^{2} (89.27/sq mi)
- Time zone: UTC+1 (CET)
  - Summer (DST): UTC+2 (CEST)
- Postal code: 3808
- Dialing code: 0465
- Website: Official website

Sella Giudicarie is a comune in the northern Italian province of Trento of the Trentino Alto Adige region. It was created on 1 January 2016 after the merger of the communes of Bondo, Breguzzo, Lardaro and Roncone.
