= Bleggio Superiore =

- Comune
- Comune di Bleggio Superiore
- Location within Italy Location within Trentino-Alto Adige/Südtirol
- Coordinates: 46°1′N 10°50′E
- Country: Italy
- Region: Trentino-Alto Adige/Südtirol
- Province: Trentino (TN)

Government
  - Mayor: Flavio Riccadonna

Area
  - Total: 32.67 km^{2} (12.61 sq mi)
- Elevation: 628 m (2,060 ft)

Population (2026)
  - Total: 1,545
  - Density: 47.29/km^{2} (122.5/sq mi)
- Demonym: Bleggiani
- Time zone: UTC+1 (CET)
  - Summer (DST): UTC+2 (CEST)
- Postal code: 38071
- Dialing code: 0465
- Website: Official website

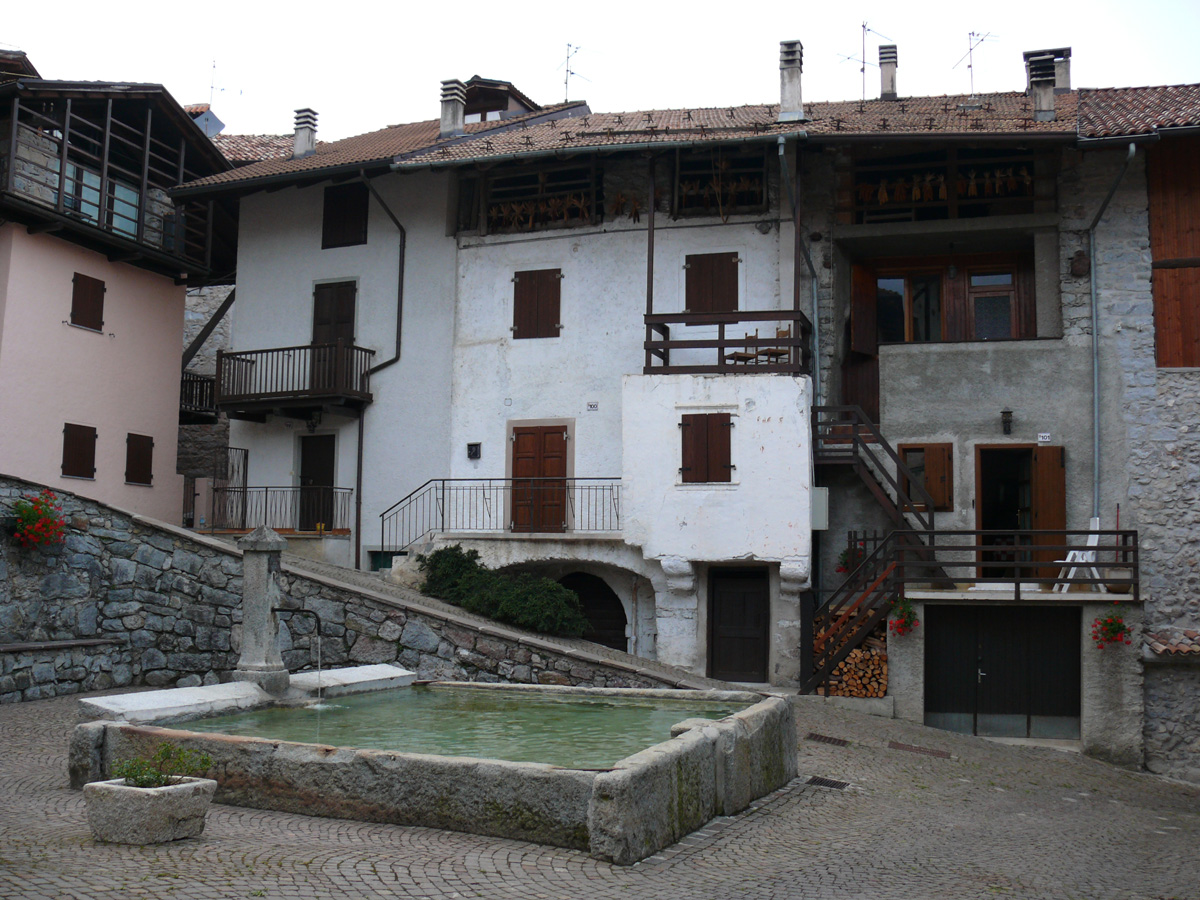
Fountain square in the frazione of Rango

Bleggio Superiore (Blécc de Sóra in local dialect) is a comune (municipality) in Trentino in the northern Italian region Trentino-Alto Adige/Südtirol, located about 25 kilometres (16 mi) west of Trento.

Bleggio Superiore borders the following municipalities: Borgo Lares, Comano Terme, Fiavè, Ledro, Tione di Trento. Its frazione of Rango is one of I Borghi più belli d'Italia ("The most beautiful villages of Italy").

== See also ==
- Bleggio Inferiore
