= Tre Ville =

- Comune
- Comune di Tre Ville
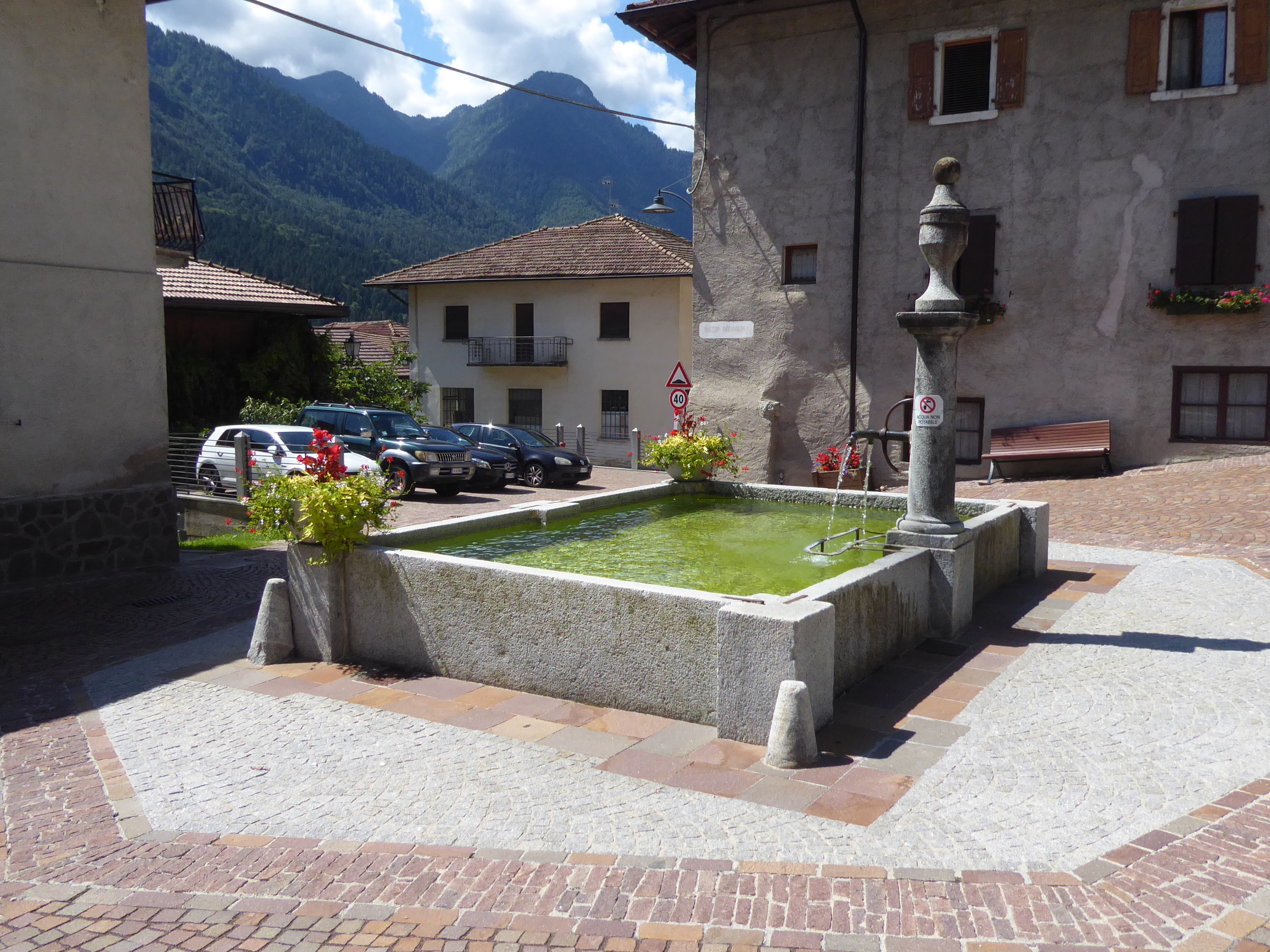
- Ragoli (Tre Ville, Trentino, Italy) - Fountain

- Location within Italy Location within Trentino-Alto Adige/Südtirol
- Coordinates: 46°04′N 10°45′E
- Country: Italy
- Region: Trentino-Alto Adige/Südtirol
- Province: Trentino (TN)

Government
  - Mayor: Matteo Leonardi

Area
  - Total: 81.94 km^{2} (31.64 sq mi)

Population (30 November 2017)
  - Total: 1,419
  - Density: 17.32/km^{2} (44.85/sq mi)
- Time zone: UTC+1 (CET)
  - Summer (DST): UTC+2 (CEST)
- Postal code: 38095
- Dialing code: 0465
- Website: Official website

Tre Ville is a comune (municipality) in the Province of Trentino in the Italian region Trentino-Alto Adige/Südtirol.

It was established on 1 January 2016 by the merger of the municipalities of Montagne, Preore and Ragoli.
