= Fort Larino =

19th-century fort in Trentino, Italy

Coordinates: 45°57′51″N 10°39′31″E

Fort Larino is an early Austro-Hungarian fort built in the Chiesa (Church) Valley, just south of Lardaro in Trentino, Italy.

Larino was built between 1860–62, at an altitude of 2,310 ft. The fort is built out of chiselled granite on top of a mountain, which made it more visible, and thus more vulnerable to artillery. The fort is quite large at 9,690 sq ft, and so was a large target for artillery. Larino's crew was 3 officers and 122 enlisted men.

Unlike newer forts, Larino's main armament was mounted in casemates instead of armoured turrets. To make up for the ease to hit, Larino had 8.25 ft of clay on top to cushion the fort against artillery blasts. Larino is surrounded by a ditch. The armament was four 15 cm guns and four 9 cm field guns.

== World War I ==
In 1914, Larino's armament was removed and its status was downgraded to a warehouse. In 1918, the fort passed into Italian hands and was used as a powder keg until 1956.

== Post-war ==
After 1970, the Autonomous Province of Trento collaborated with the municipalities of the valley to fix up Fort Larino. The fort was water-proofed and is now a World War I museum open for tours.

== See also ==
- Austro-Hungarian fortifications on the Italian border
- Fort Corno
- Fort Carriola
