= Montagne, Trentino =

Montagne
- Comune
- Comune di Montagne
- Location within Italy Location within Trentino-Alto Adige/Südtirol
- Coordinates: 46°4′N 10°45′E
- Country: Italy
- Region: Trentino-Alto Adige/Südtirol
- Province: Trentino (TN)
- Frazioni: Cort, Larzana, Binio

Government
  - Mayor: Michela Simoni

Area
  - Total: 12.2 km^{2} (4.7 sq mi)
- Elevation: 825 m (2,707 ft)

Population (Dec. 2004)
  - Total: 293
  - Density: 24.0/km^{2} (62.2/sq mi)
- Demonym: Montagnoi
- Time zone: UTC+1 (CET)
  - Summer (DST): UTC+2 (CEST)
- Postal code: 38070
- Dialing code: 0465
- Patron saint: S. Bartholomew
- Saint day: August 24th

Montagne (Le Montàgne in local dialect) was a comune (municipality) in Trentino in the northern Italian region Trentino-Alto Adige/Südtirol, located about 30 kilometres (19 mi) west of Trento. As of 31 December 2004, it had a population of 293 and an area of 12.2 square kilometres (4.7 mi^{2}). It was merged with Preore and Ragoli on January 1, 2016, to form a new municipality, Tre Ville.

The municipality of Montagne contains the frazioni (subdivisions, mainly villages and hamlets) Cort, Larzana and Binio.

Montagne borders the following municipalities: Ragoli, Spiazzo, Bocenago, Pelugo, Stenico, Villa Rendena, Vigo Rendena, Darè and Preore.

== Demographic evolution ==
Historical population

Year	Pop.	±%
1861	?	—
1871	?	—
1881	?	—
1901	?	—
1911	?	—

Year	Pop.	±%
1921	737	—
1931	530	−28.1%
1936	370	−30.2%
1951	335	−9.5%
1961	390	+16.4%

Year	Pop.	±%
1971	338	−13.3%
1981	305	−9.8%
1991	294	−3.6%
2001	304	+3.4%

Source: Data from ISTAT
