= Fort Carriola =

Austro-Hungarian 20th-century fort in Trentino, Italy

Fort Carriola is an Austro-Hungarian fort built in Northern Italy. Before the fort was built, a target was erected on the site to see if the advancing Italians could fire at the fort from the Giumella Pass. Carriola was built at an altitude of 1054 m (3478 ft) between 1909 and 1915, and was the newest, and last, fortification in the Lardaro Group at the time of the Italian declaration of war in May 1915. The fort was built in 3 different sections, the casemate block for the garrison, the howitzer battery block where the artillery was, and several concrete caponiers. The caponiers were located in a granite moat with a masonry Counterscarp. Carriola was meant to link the fortifications of the Alto Garda to those in the Giudicarie Valley. The fort is a good example of topographical camouflage, as it was built into the contours of the hillside. Unlike most of the other fortifications in the group, Carriola was reinforced with concrete and steel. In some places, the concrete and steel was 50 cm thick. In 1911, Italian spies were able to get so close that they could observe the small work being done on the fort.

== Armament ==
- Four 10 cm guns mounted in armoured domes
- Five machine guns for close defence

== World War I and post-war ==
The fort was shelled, and surprisingly bombed, by the Italians from 20 to 21 November 1915. In the spring of 1916, the fort was surrounded on three sides by Italian artillery and was shelled, but this did little damage and no deaths were reported in the fort. Carriola was occupied by the Italians on 2 November 1918. Carriola suffered more damage due to steel salvaging efforts after the war than it did during the war. Today, a radio tower is located on top of the remains of the fort.

== See also ==
- Austro-Hungarian fortifications on the Italian border
- Fort Corno
- Fort Larino
