= Breguzzo =

Ex-municipality of Sella Giudicarie

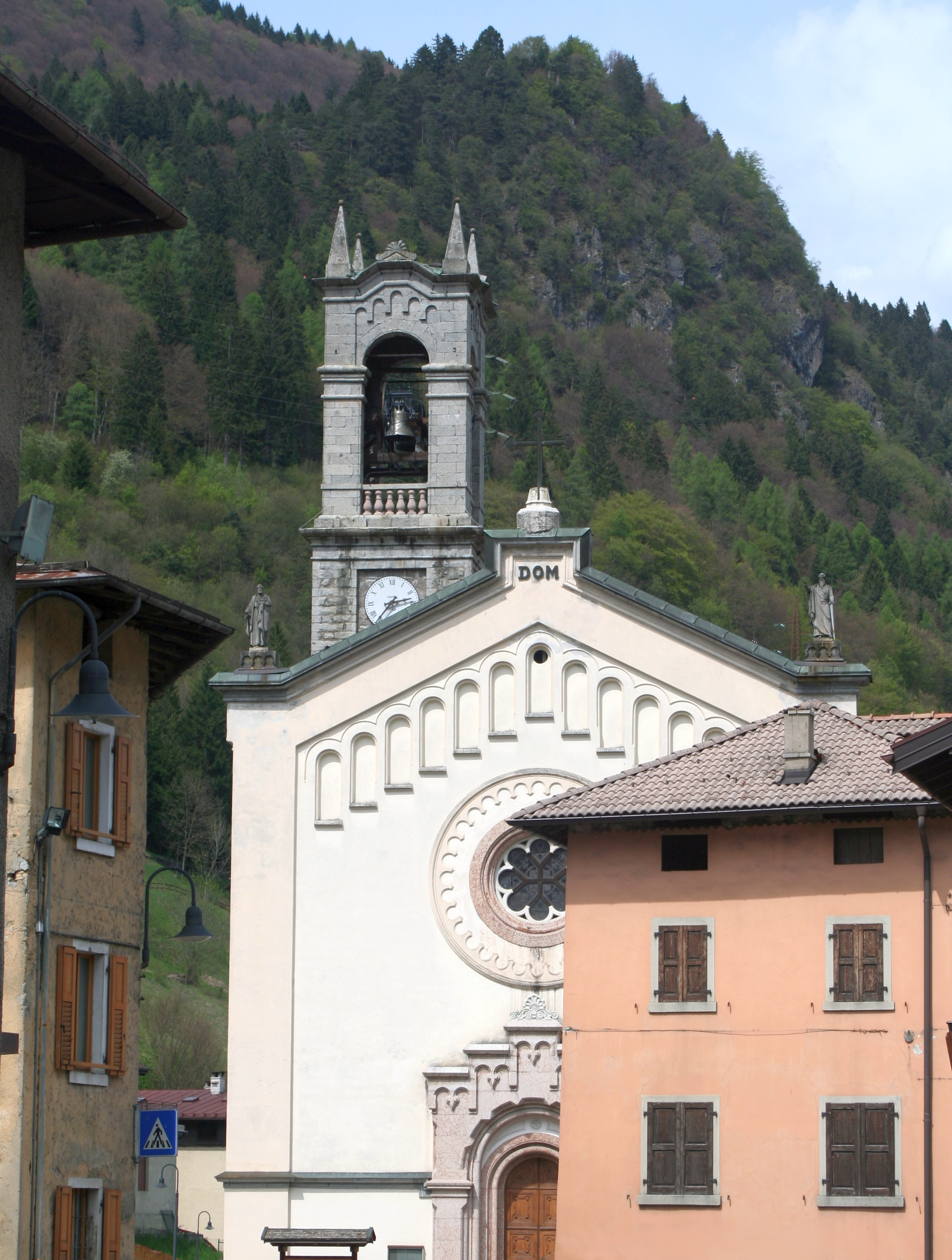
Parish church.

Breguzzo (Bregucc in local dialect) was a comune (municipality) in Trentino in the northern Italian region Trentino-Alto Adige/Südtirol, located about 35 kilometres (22 mi) west of Trento. It was merged with Bondo, Lardaro and Roncone on January 1, 2016, to form a new municipality, Sella Giudicarie.

Within Breguzzo is found a specific kind of marble.
