= Preore =

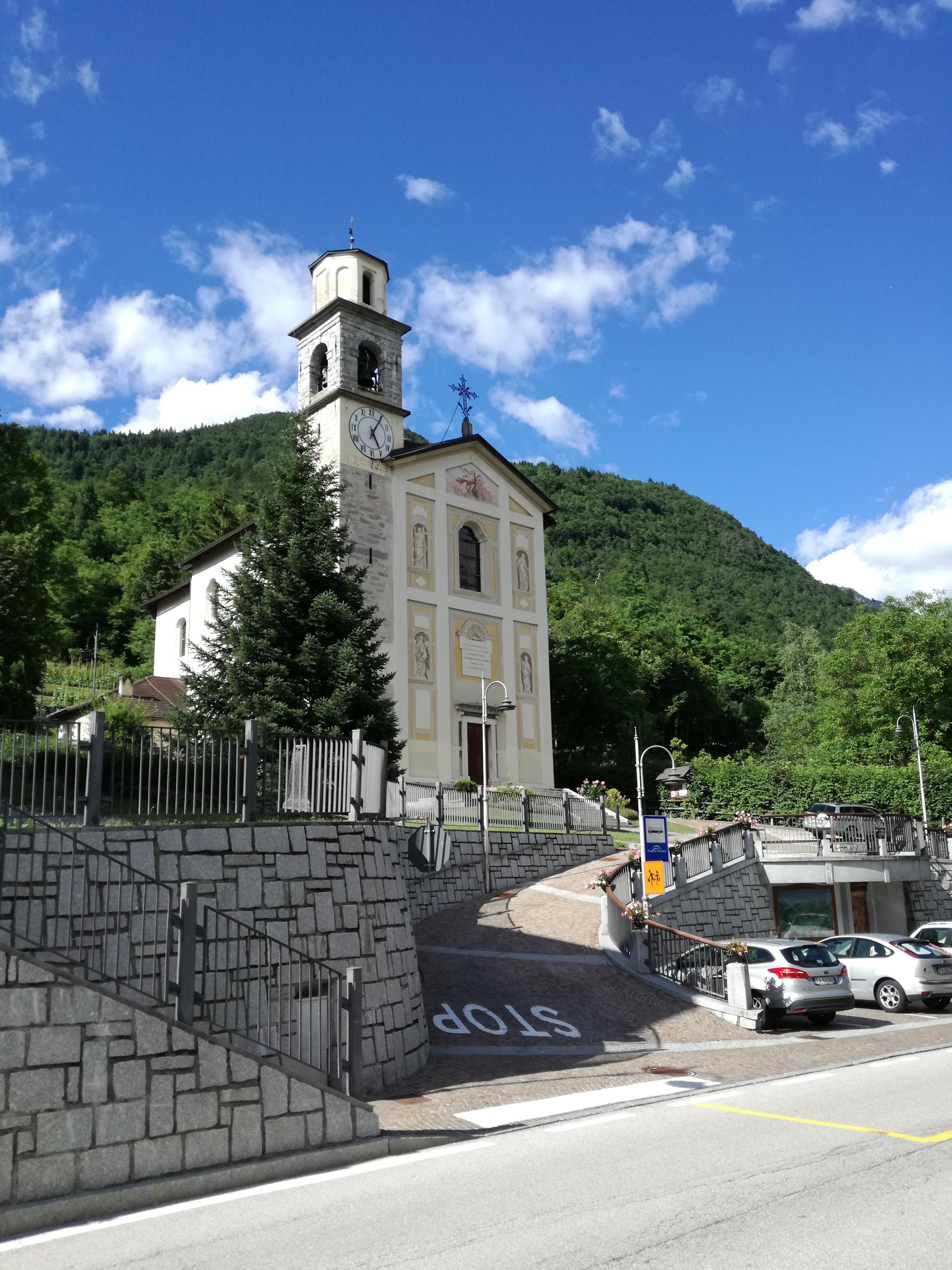
Santa Maria Maddalena church.

Preore (Praór in local dialect) was a comune (municipality) in Trentino in the northern Italian region Trentino-Alto Adige/Südtirol, located about 25 kilometres (16 mi) west of Trento. It was merged with Montagne and Ragoli on January 1, 2016, to form a new municipality, Tre Ville.
