= Lardaro =

Commune in Trentino, Italy

Coordinates: 45°58′N 10°39′E

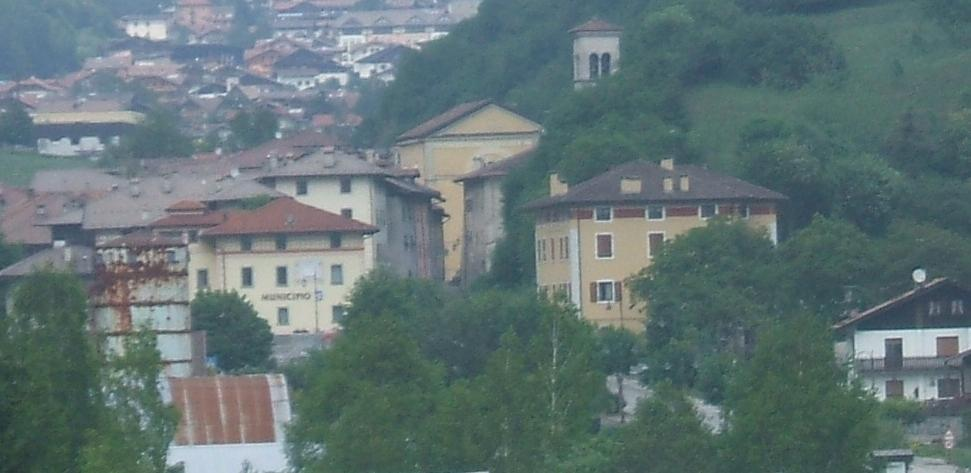
The town of Lardaro

Lardaro (Lardèr in local dialect) was a comune (municipality) in Trentino in the northern Italian region Trentino-Alto Adige/Südtirol, located about 35 kilometres (22 mi) southwest of Trento. It was merged with Bondo, Breguzzo and Roncone on 1 January 2016, to form a new municipality, Sella Giudicarie.

== See also ==
- Fort Larino
