= Roncone =

Municipality in Trentino-Alto Adige, Italy

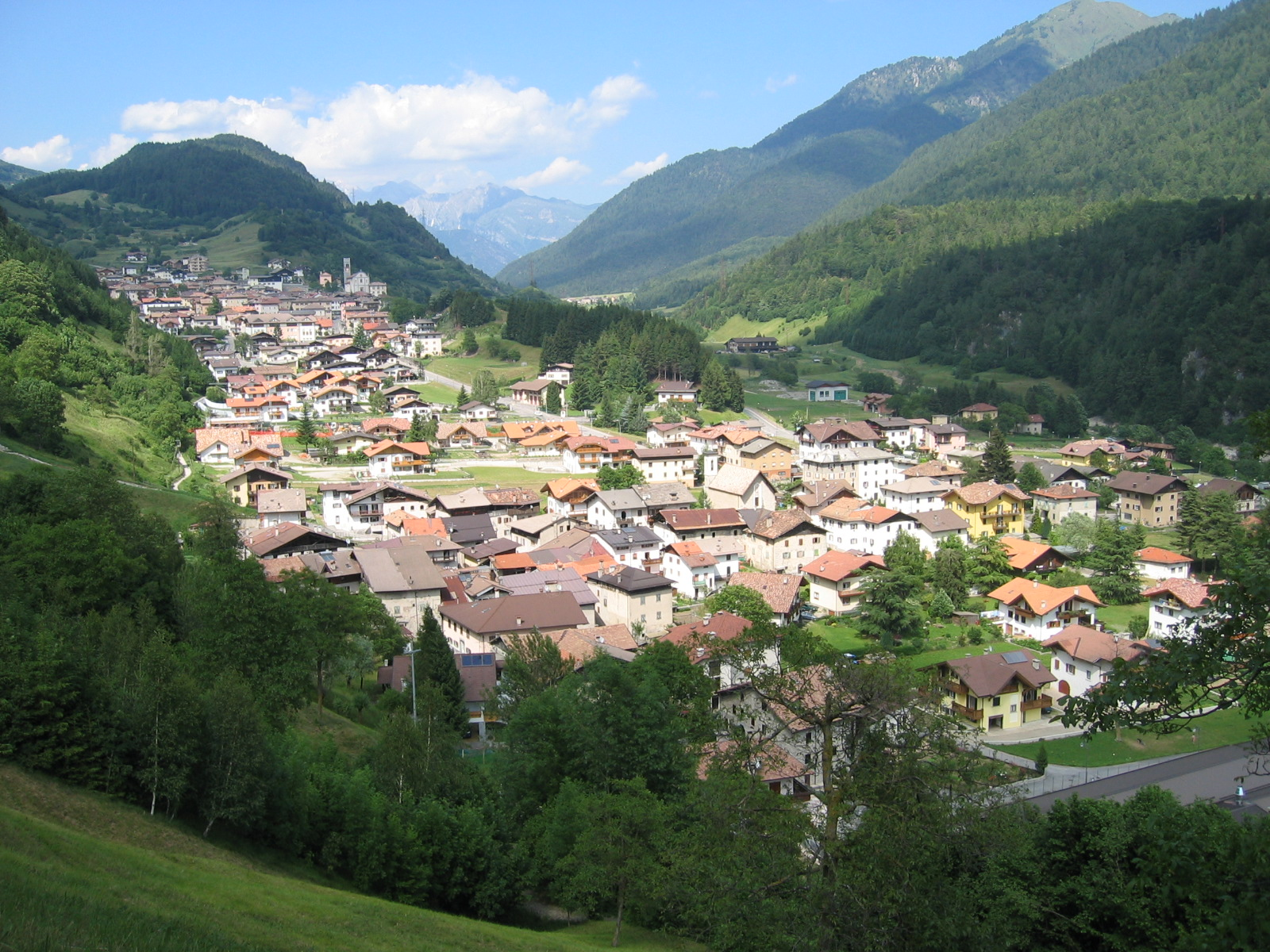
Spring view of Roncone

Roncone (Roncon in local dialect) was a comune (municipality) in Trentino in the northern Italian region of Trentino-Alto Adige/Südtirol, located about 35 kilometres (22 mi) west of Trento. It was merged with Bondo, Lardaro and Breguzzo on January 1, 2016, to form a new municipality, Sella Giudicarie.

Roncone was founded as a castle c. 1200.

In the late 19th century, Roncone was a town of 2,000 inhabitants, with a "venerable" church, dedicated to Saint Sebastian. The unusual position of the valley was described in German as Querspalte ("cross-column" or "transverse cleft") in a 19th century geological text.
