= Tenno, Trentino =

Tenno
- Comune
- Comune di Tenno
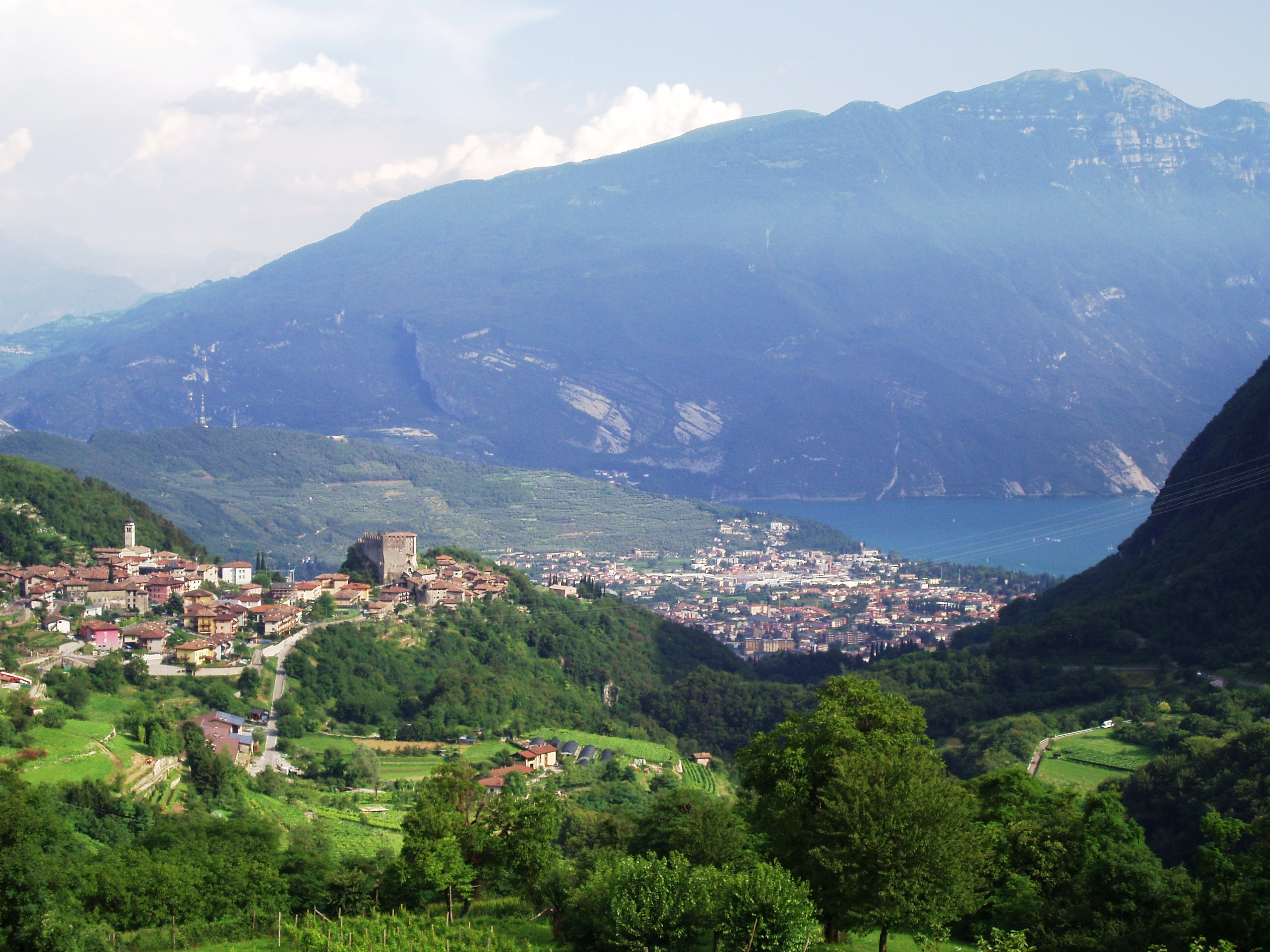

- Location within Italy Location within Trentino-Alto Adige/Südtirol
- Coordinates: 45°55′N 10°50′E
- Country: Italy
- Region: Trentino-Alto Adige/Südtirol
- Province: Trentino (TN)
- Frazioni: Gavazzo, Cologna, Ville del Monte, Pranzo

Government
  - Mayor: Giuliano Marocchi

Area
  - Total: 28.3 km^{2} (10.9 sq mi)
- Elevation: 428 m (1,404 ft)

Population (30 September 2016)
  - Total: 2,045
  - Density: 72.3/km^{2} (187/sq mi)
- Demonym: Tennesi
- Time zone: UTC+1 (CET)
  - Summer (DST): UTC+2 (CEST)
- Postal code: 38060
- Dialing code: 0464
- Website: Official website

Tenno (Tén in local dialect) is a comune (municipality) in Trentino in the northern Italian region Trentino-Alto Adige/Südtirol, located about 30 kilometres (19 mi) southwest of Trento.

Tenno borders the following municipalities: Comano Terme, Fiavè, Arco, Ledro and Riva del Garda. Its neighborhood of Canale is one of I Borghi più belli d'Italia ("The most beautiful villages of Italy").

Tenno contains the waterfalls of Cascate del Varone. Tenno hosts a yearly summer festival called Quarta d'Agosto (Fourth of August) which is celebrated the fourth Sunday of August, in Cologna.
