= Fiavé =

- Comune
- Comune di Fiavé
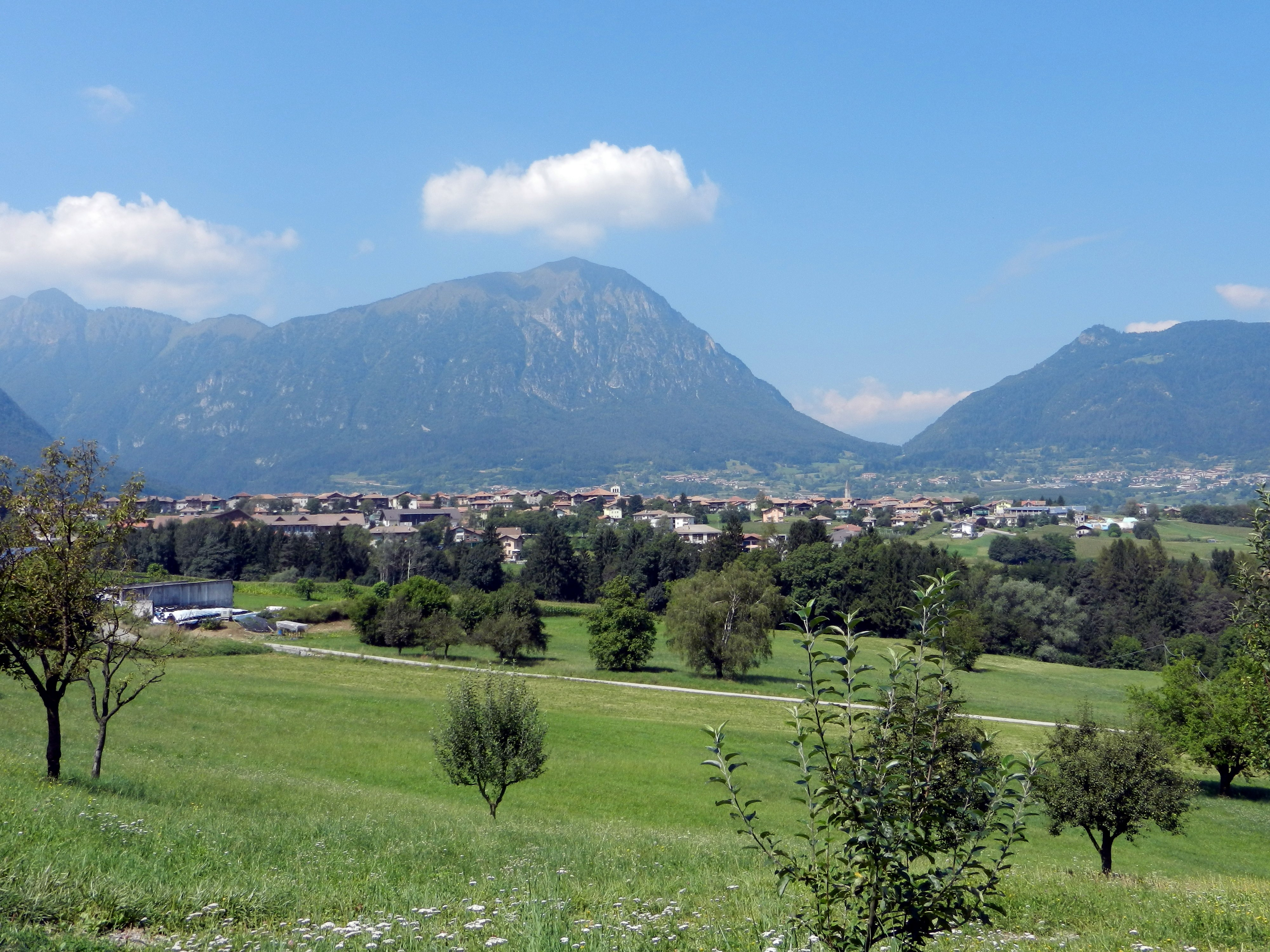
- Panorami view of Fiavè

- Location within Italy Location within Trentino-Alto Adige/Südtirol
- Coordinates: 46°0′16″N 10°50′32″E
- Country: Italy
- Region: Trentino-Alto Adige/Südtirol
- Province: Trentino (TN)
- Frazioni: Ballino, Favrio, Stumiaga

Government
  - Mayor: Beniamino Bugoloni

Area
  - Total: 24.3 km^{2} (9.4 sq mi)
- Elevation: 669 m (2,195 ft)

Population (2026)
  - Total: 1,103
  - Density: 45.4/km^{2} (118/sq mi)
- Time zone: UTC+1 (CET)
  - Summer (DST): UTC+2 (CEST)
- Postal code: 38075
- Dialing code: 0465
- Website: Official website

Fiavé is a comune (municipality) and a village in Trentino in the northern Italian region Trentino-Alto Adige/Südtirol, located about 25 kilometres (16 mi) southwest of Trento. On 31 December 2004, it had a population of 1,053 and an area of 24.3 square kilometres (9.4 mi^{2}).

The municipality of Fiavè contains the frazioni (subdivisions, mainly villages and hamlets) of Ballino, Favrio and Stumiaga.

Fiavè borders the municipalities of Comano Terme, Bleggio Superiore, Ledro and Tenno.

== Demographic evolution ==
Historical population

Year	Pop.	±%
1861	?	—
1871	?	—
1881	?	—
1901	?	—
1911	?	—

Year	Pop.	±%
1921	1,378	—
1931	1,216	−11.8%
1936	1,142	−6.1%
1951	1,236	+8.2%
1961	1,202	−2.8%

Year	Pop.	±%
1971	1,026	−14.6%
1981	1,019	−0.7%
1991	992	−2.6%
2001	1,029	+3.7%

Source: Data from ISTAT

== World Heritage Site ==
It is the location of one or more prehistoric pile-dwellings (or stilt house) settlements that are part of the prehistoric pile dwellings around the Alps UNESCO World Heritage Site.
