= Bondo, Trentino =

Bondo
- Comune
- Comune di Bondo
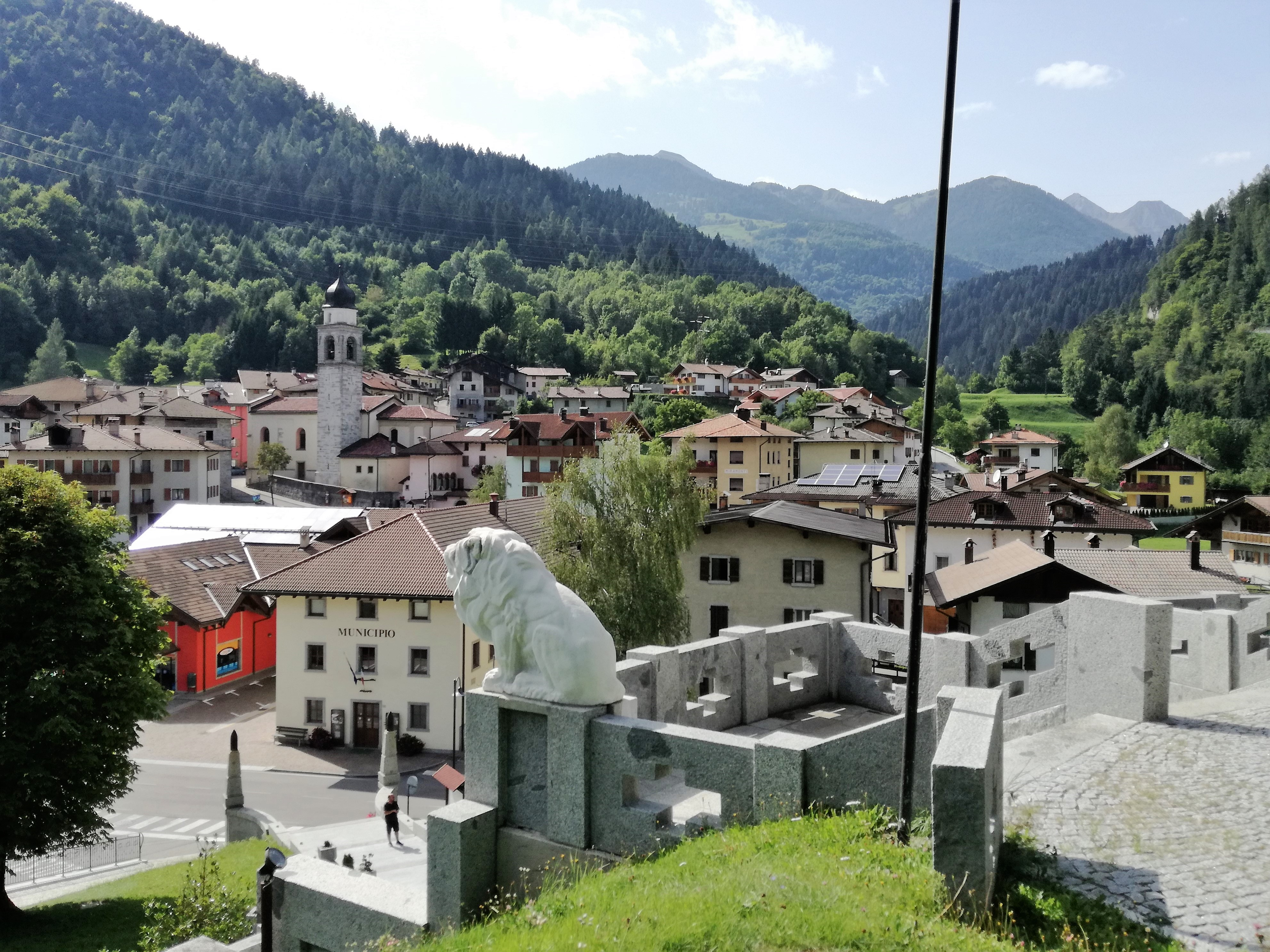

- Location within Italy Location within Trentino-Alto Adige/Südtirol
- Coordinates: 46°9′N 11°12′E
- Country: Italy
- Region: Trentino-Alto Adige/Südtirol
- Province: Trentino (TN)

Area
  - Total: 9 km^{2} (3.5 sq mi)
- Elevation: 644 m (2,113 ft)

Population (2001)
  - Total: 1,448
  - Density: 160/km^{2} (420/sq mi)
- Time zone: UTC+1 (CET)
  - Summer (DST): UTC+2 (CEST)
- Postal code: 38041
- Dialing code: 0461
- Website: Official website

Bondo (Bónt in local dialect) was a comune (municipality) in Trentino in the northern Italian region Trentino-Alto Adige/Südtirol, located about 35 kilometres (22 mi) west of Trento. It was merged with Breguzzo, Lardaro and Roncone on January 1, 2016, to form a new municipality, Sella Giudicarie.
