= San Lorenzo Dorsino =

- Comune
- Comune di San Lorenzo Dorsino
- View of San Lorenzo in Banale.

- Location within Italy Location within Trentino-Alto Adige/Südtirol
- Coordinates: 46°5′N 10°55′E
- Country: Italy
- Region: Trentino-Alto Adige/Südtirol
- Province: Trentino (TN)
- Frazioni: Andogno, Deggia, Dorsino, Moline, Nembia, San Lorenzo in Banale (communal seat), Tavodo telephone = 0465

Government
  - Mayor: Ilaria Rigotti

Area
  - Total: 62.1 km^{2} (24.0 sq mi)
- Elevation: 758 m (2,487 ft)

Population (28 February 2017)
  - Total: 1,581
  - Density: 25.5/km^{2} (65.9/sq mi)
- Demonym: Sanlorenziani
- Time zone: UTC+1 (CET)
  - Summer (DST): UTC+2 (CEST)
- Postal code: 38070, 38078
- Website: Official website

San Lorenzo Dorsino is a commune in Trentino, northern Italy. It was created in 2015 by the merger of the former communes of San Lorenzo in Banale and Dorsino.
