= Bolbeno =

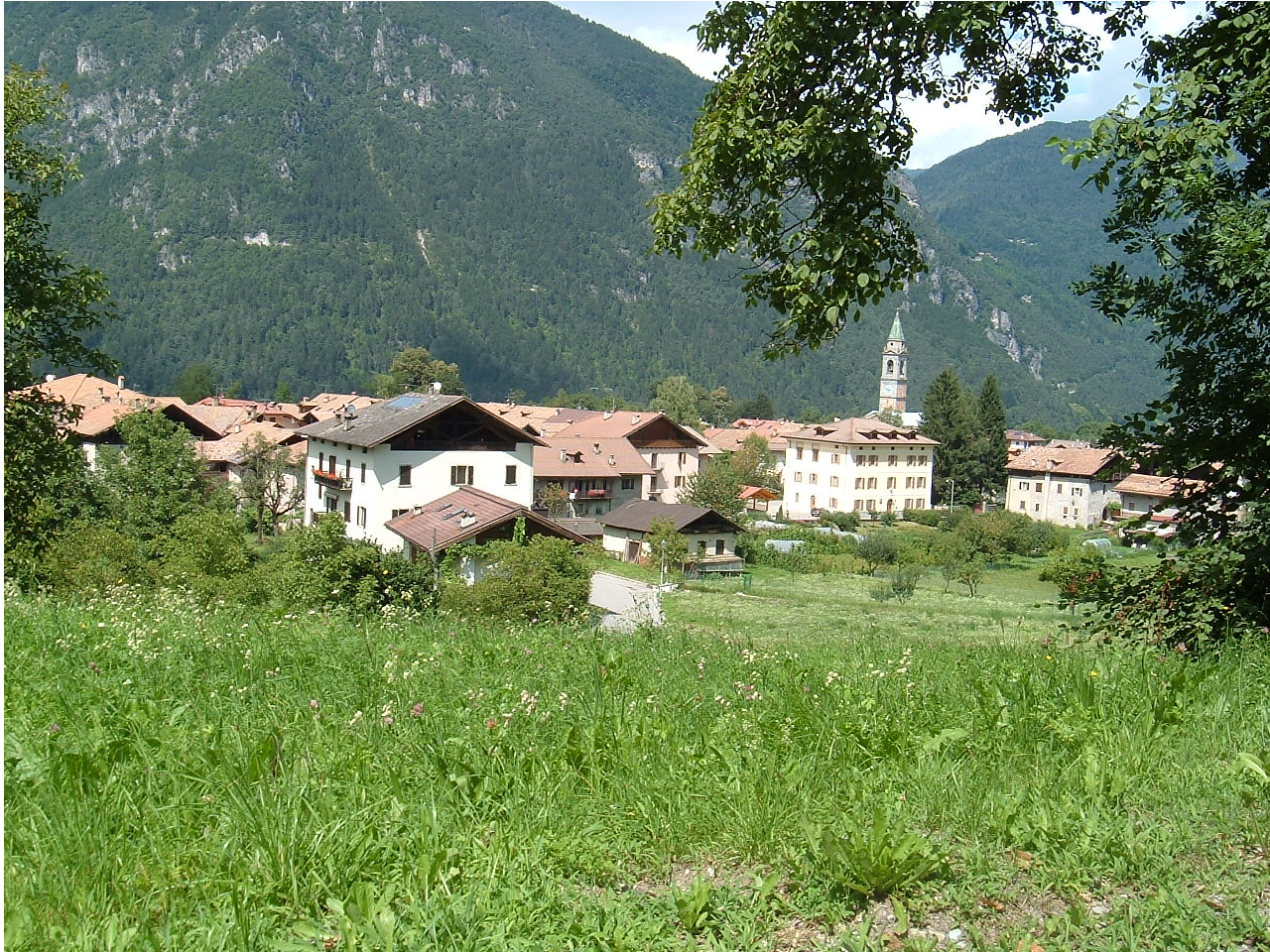
Bolbeno in summer.

Bolbeno (Bolbén or Balbén in local dialect) was a comune (municipality) in Trentino in the northern Italian region Trentino-Alto Adige/Südtirol, located about 30 kilometres (19 mi) west of Trento.
