= Dorsino =

Former Italian comune

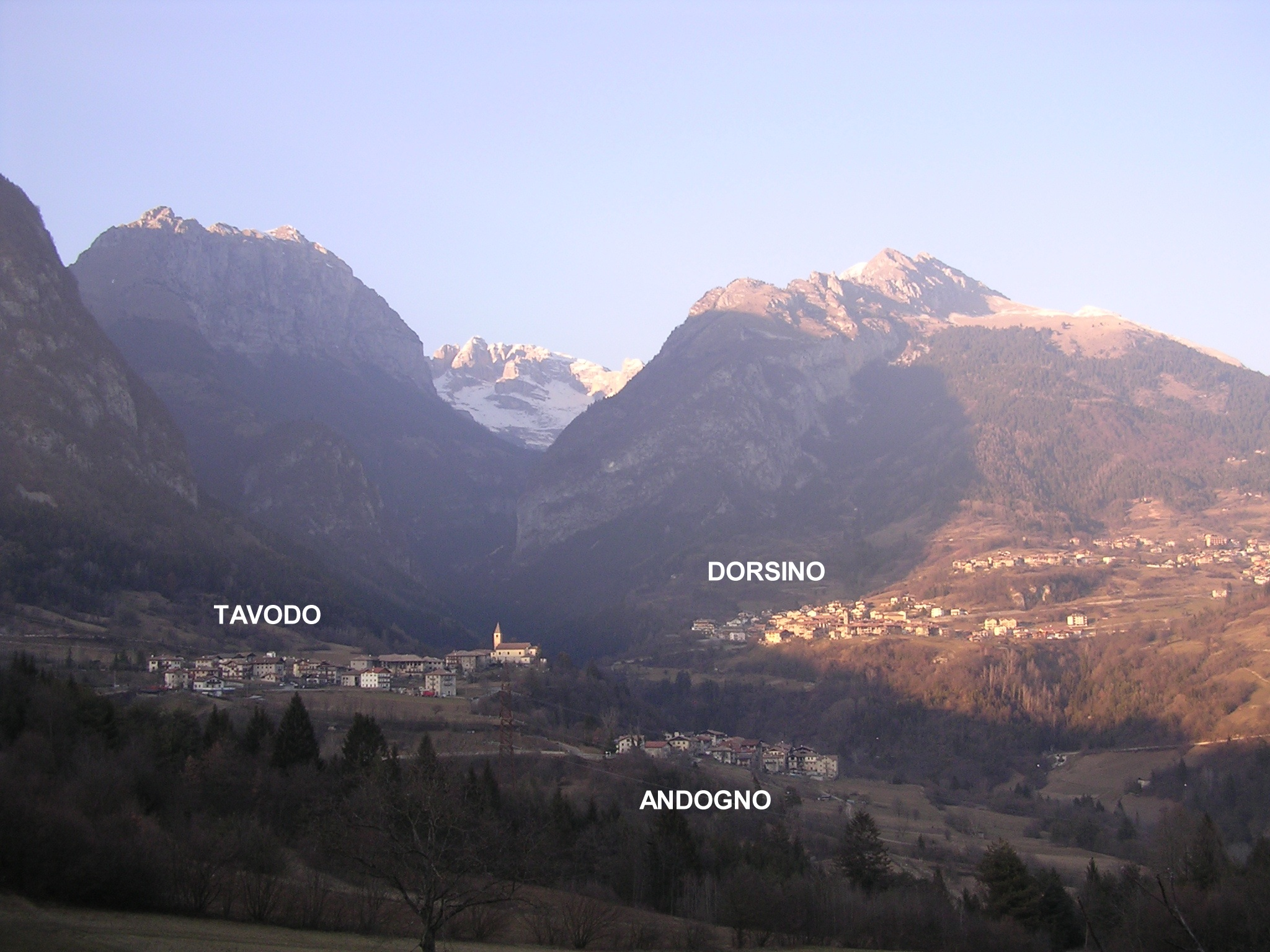
Dorsino

Dorsino (Dorsin in local dialect) was a comune (municipality) in Trentino in the northern Italian region Trentino-Alto Adige/Südtirol, located about 15 kilometres (9 mi) west of Trento. As of 31 December 2004, it had a population of 444 and an area of 12.2 square kilometres (4.7 sq mi). It was merged with San Lorenzo in Banale on January 1, 2015, to form a new municipality, San Lorenzo Dorsino.
