= San Lorenzo in Banale =

Former Italian comune

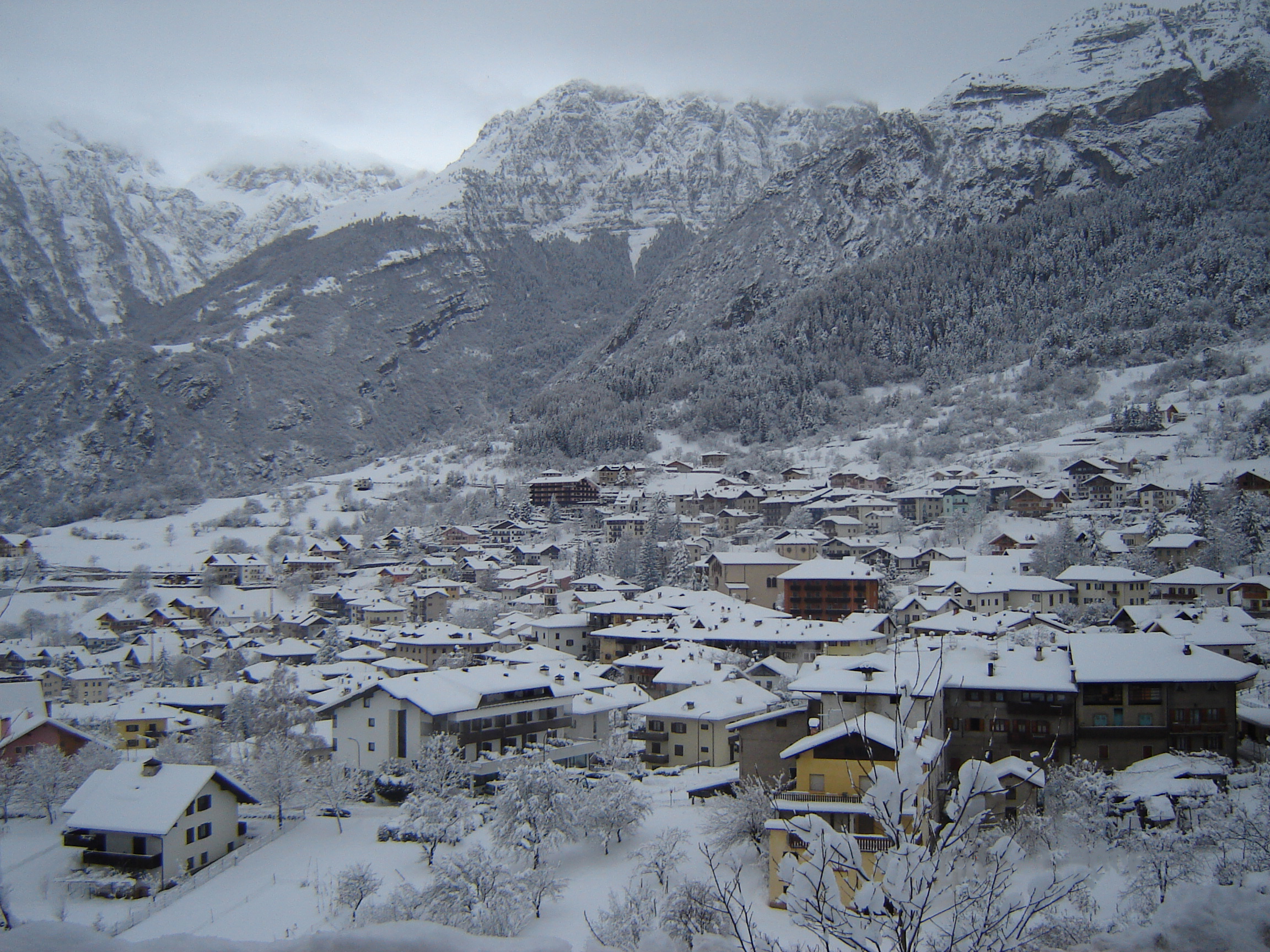
Winter view of San Lorenzo in Banale.

San Lorenzo in Banale (San Lorénz in local dialect) was a comune (municipality) in Trentino in the northern Italian region Trentino-Alto Adige/Südtirol, located about 15 kilometres (9 mi) west of Trento. It was merged with Dorsino on January 1, 2015, to form a new municipality, San Lorenzo Dorsino. It is one of I Borghi più belli d'Italia ("The most beautiful villages of Italy").

== Food ==
Ciuìga is a locally produced sausage made with pork, turnips, and pepper. It is then smoked using juniper branches and served during the winter months accompanied with polenta, sauerkraut, or potatoes. The name originates from the local dialect word for pine cone, because of its shape and size. It is also a Slow Food presidium.
