= Massimeno =

- Comune
- Comune di Massimeno
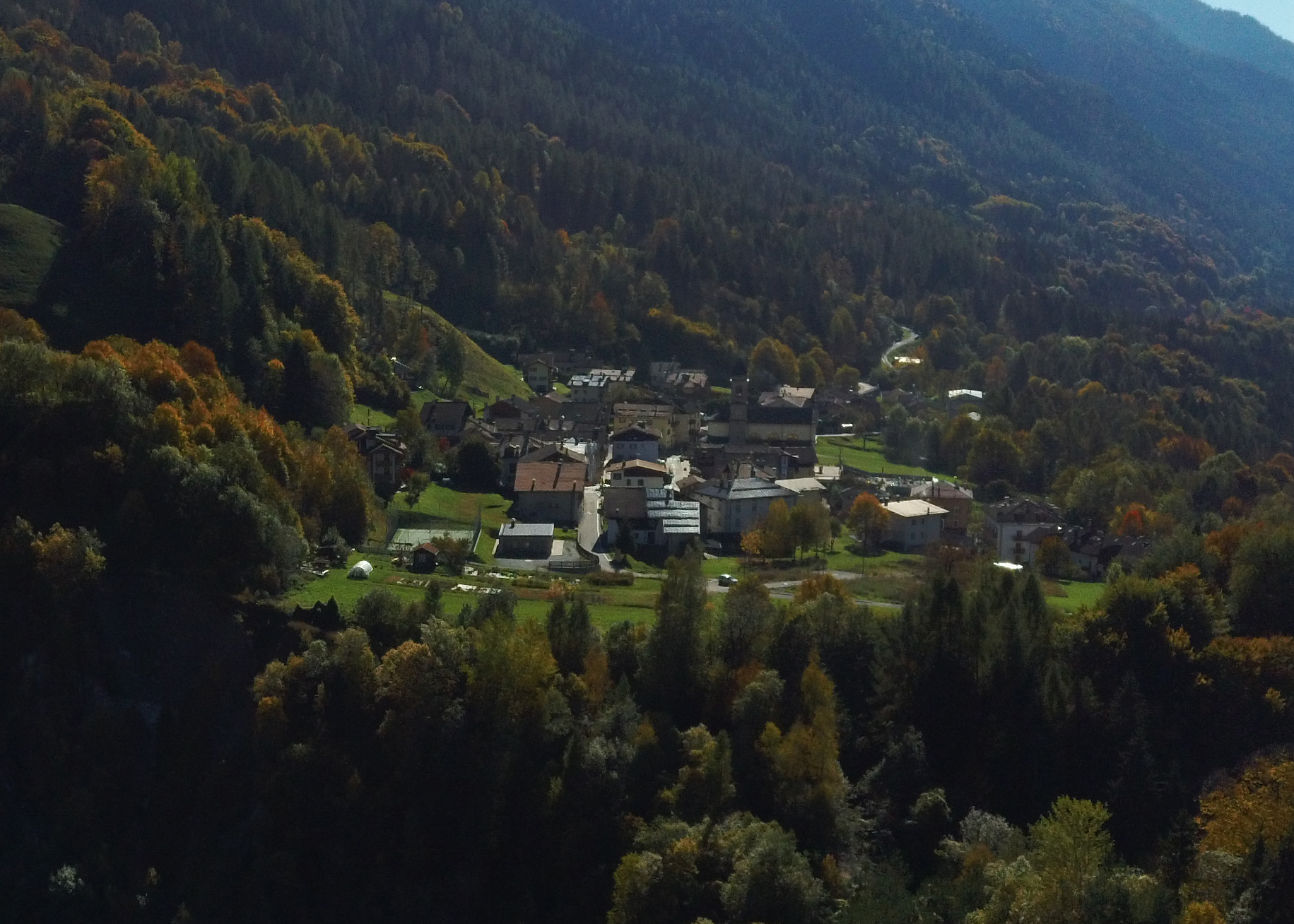

- Location within Italy Location within Trentino-Alto Adige/Südtirol
- Coordinates: 46°9′N 10°46′E
- Country: Italy
- Region: Trentino-Alto Adige/Südtirol
- Province: Trentino (TN)

Government
  - Mayor: Norman Masè

Area
  - Total: 21.4 km^{2} (8.3 sq mi)

Population (2026)
  - Total: 134
  - Density: 6.26/km^{2} (16.2/sq mi)
- Time zone: UTC+1 (CET)
  - Summer (DST): UTC+2 (CEST)
- Postal code: 38086
- Dialing code: 0465
- Website: Official website

Massimeno is a comune (municipality) in Trentino in the northern Italian region Trentino-Alto Adige/Südtirol, located about 30 kilometres (19 mi) northwest of Trento. As of 31 December 2004, it had a population of 106 and an area of 21.4 square kilometres (8.3 mi^{2}).

Massimeno borders the following municipalities: Giustino, Spiazzo, Strembo, Caderzone, Daone, Bocenago, Pelugo and Comano Terme.

== Geography ==
Massimeno is the only village in Val Rendena not situated along the course of the Sarca river, instead located on a terrace on the western slopes of Monte della Costa di Nambì (1,803m), arranged around a broad piazza with views across the valley to the Adamello-Presanella Alps.

The municipal territory extends from the valley floor near the Sarca to the summit of Monte Làres at 3,354 metres. Much of the territory falls within the Adamello Brenta Natural Park.

== History ==
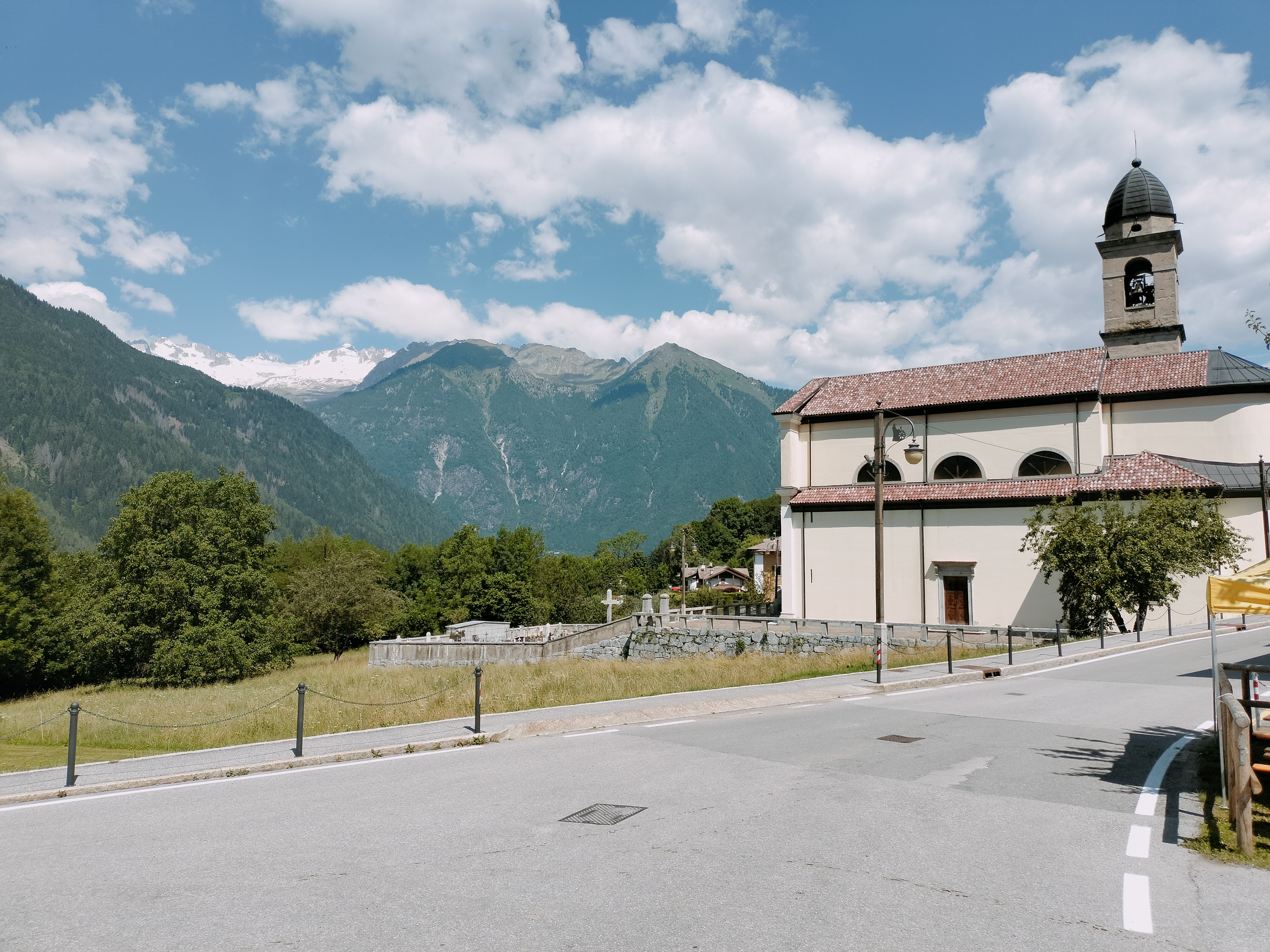
Church of the Madonna di Loreto, with the Presanella in the background

Human settlement in the area dates to the Bronze Age, with multiple identifiable prehistoric community sites at Massimeno and nearby Giustino

In 1928 Massimeno was merged administratively into the enlarged comune of Pinzolo and Giustino. It was reconstituted as an Independent comune in 1952.

Massimeno has experienced significant depopulation over the twentieth century, largely as a result of emigration following the First World War. This pattern was common across Val Rendena, where the traditional itinerant trade of the Arrotino (knife grinder) took many inhabitants across Europe and beyond.

== Monuments ==
At the edge of the village terrace stands the Church of the Madonna di Loreto built in 1758 and reconstructed in 1862

Above the village, stands the medieval chapel of San Giovanni Battista, once served by a hermit. The chapel was decorated in 1534 by Simone Baschenis, the Bergamo painter who also produced the celebrated Danse macbre fresco of 1539 in the Church of Saint Vigilius of Trent (Pinzolo, Church of San Vigilio) in nearby Pinzolo. Remains of frescoes including a "Crucifixtion" are visible on the eastern facade, and a figure of Saint Christopher with saints and a Val Rendena landscape is painted to the left of the main portal.

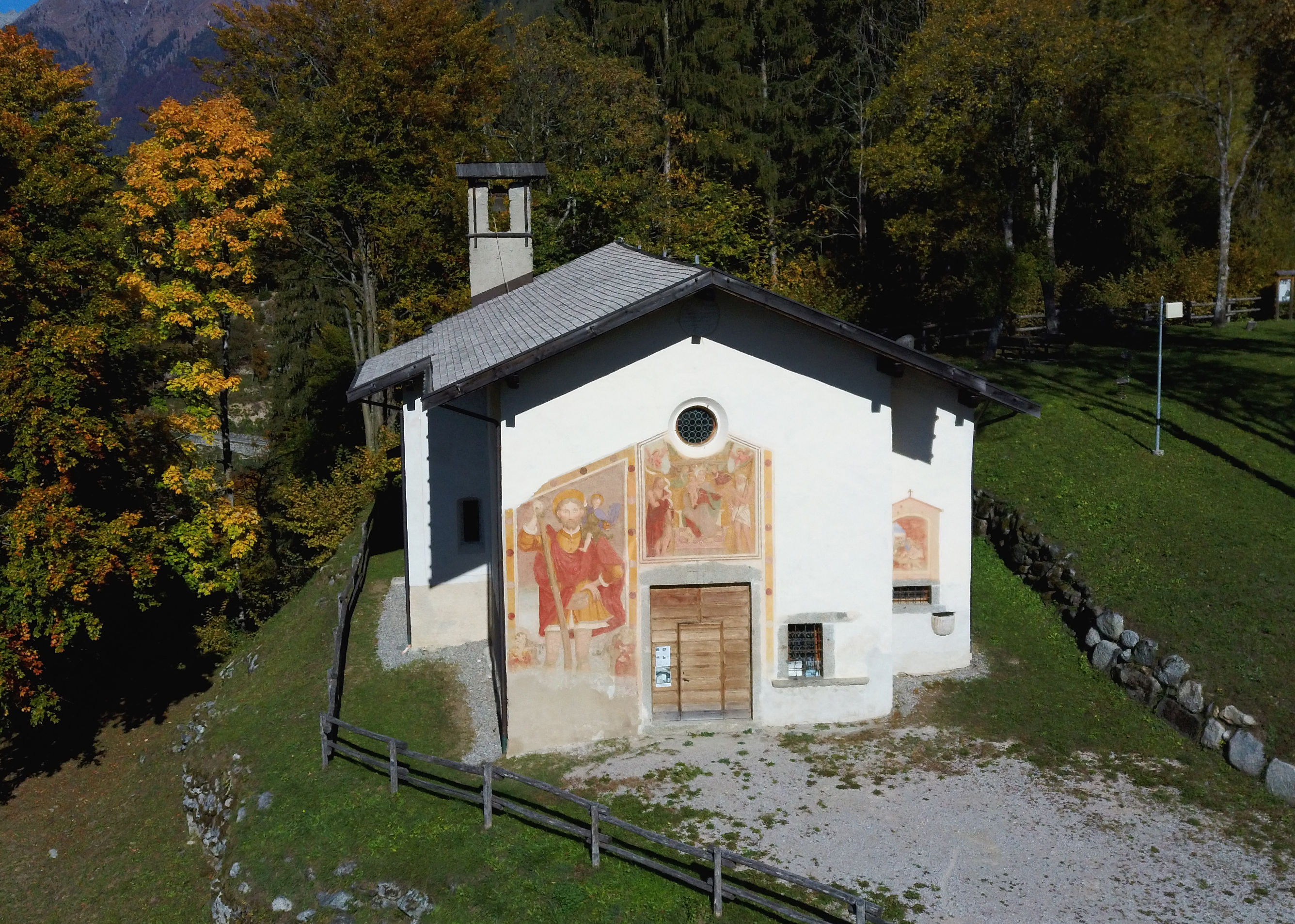
The ancient Church of San Giovanni Battista

== See also ==
- Val Rendena
- Pinzolo
- Giustino, Trentino
- Adamello Brenta Natural Park

== Historical Population ==
Historical population

Year	Pop.	±%
1861	?	—
1871	?	—
1881	?	—
1901	?	—
1911	?	—

Year	Pop.	±%
1921	162	—
1931	159	−1.9%
1936	130	−18.2%
1951	137	+5.4%
1961	100	−27.0%

Year	Pop.	±%
1971	82	−18.0%
1981	88	+7.3%
1991	91	+3.4%
2001	105	+15.4%

Source: Data from ISTAT
