= Vigilius =

Vigilius may refer to:

- Pope Vigilius (died 555), Pope 537-555
- Vigilius of Trent (c. 353-405), bishop, martyr and saint
  - Church of Saint Vigilius of Trent (Pinzolo)
- Vigilius of Thapsus, 5th-century bishop and writer
- Vigilius Eriksen (1722-1782), Danish painter
- Vigilius (amphibian), an extinct genus of amphibian
