= Caderzone Terme =

- Comune
- Comune di Caderzone Terme
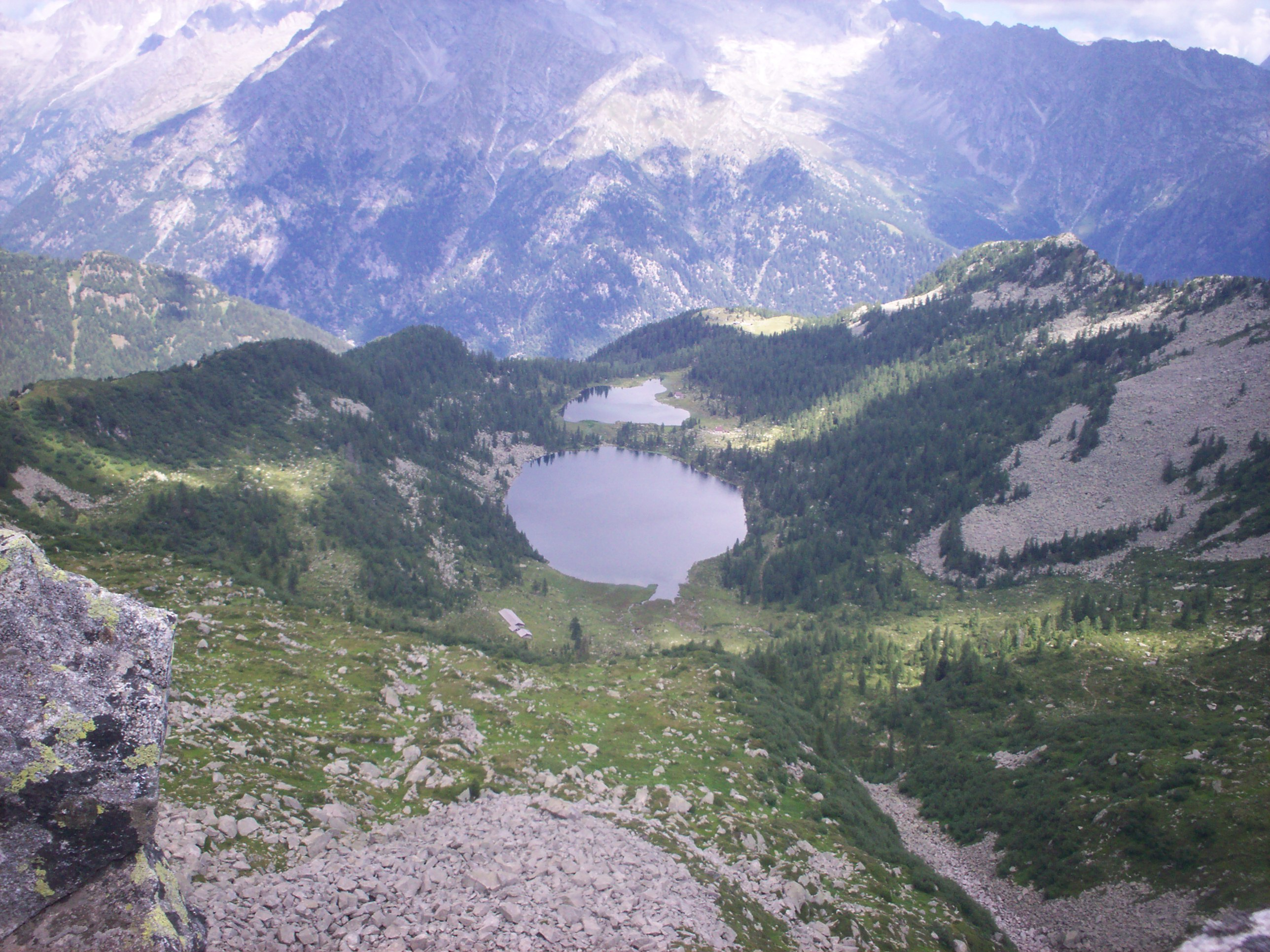
- San Giuliano lakes, in the territory of the municipality

- Location within Italy Location within Trentino-Alto Adige/Südtirol
- Coordinates: 46°8′N 10°45′E
- Country: Italy
- Region: Trentino-Alto Adige/Südtirol
- Province: Trentino (TN)

Government
  - Mayor: Marcello Mosca

Area
  - Total: 18.6 km^{2} (7.2 sq mi)
- Elevation: 723 m (2,372 ft)

Population (2026)
  - Total: 692
  - Density: 37.2/km^{2} (96.4/sq mi)
- Demonym: Caderzonesi
- Time zone: UTC+1 (CET)
  - Summer (DST): UTC+2 (CEST)
- Postal code: 38080
- Dialing code: 0465
- Website: Official website

Caderzone Terme (Cadärción or Cadarciùn in local dialect) is a comune (municipality) in Trentino in the northern Italian region Trentino-Alto Adige/Südtirol, located about 30 kilometres (19 mi) west of Trento.

Caderzone borders the following municipalities: Pinzolo, Giustino, Spiazzo, Strembo, Carisolo, Massimeno, and Bocenago.

== Twin towns ==
- Weißbach bei Lofer, Austria
- Sassofeltrio, Italy

== See also ==
- Val Rendena
