= Giudicarie =

Coordinates: 46.030°N 10.730°E

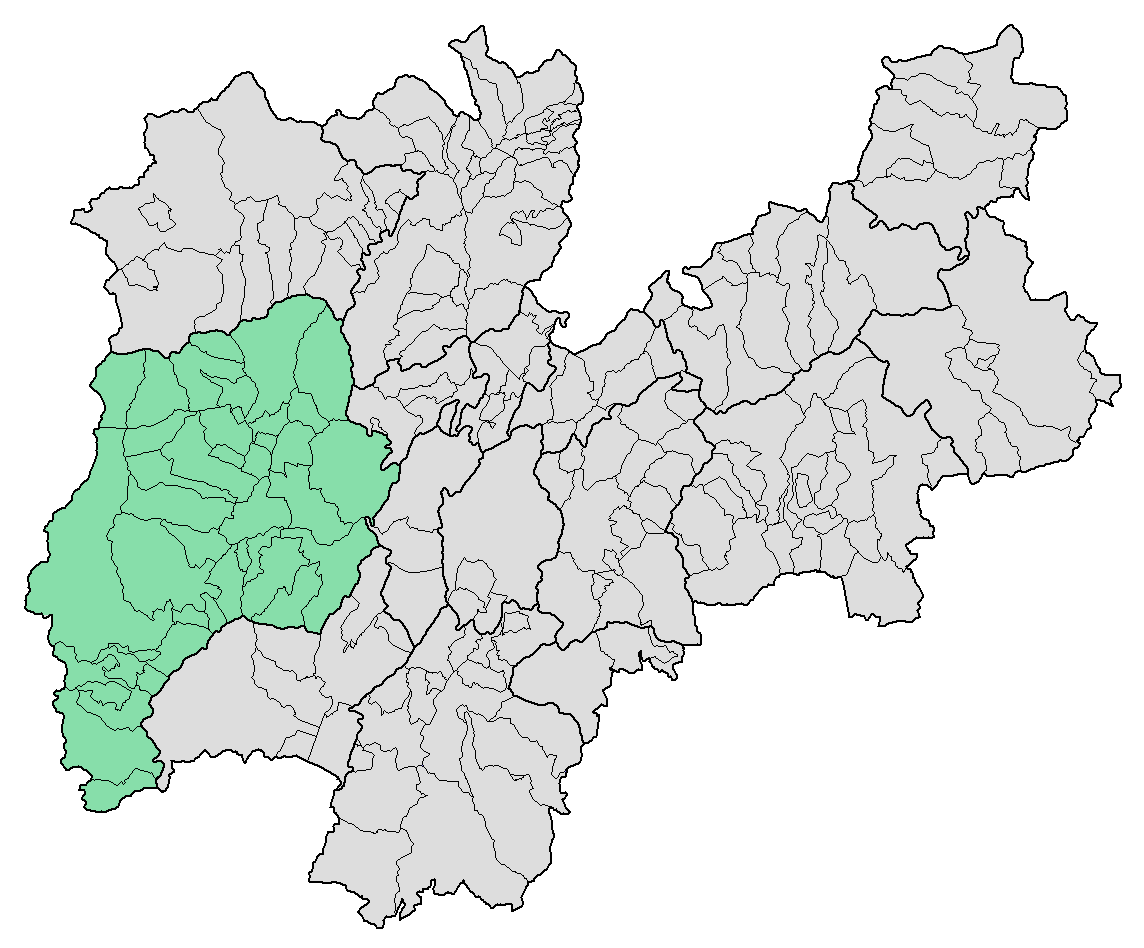
Territory of Giudicarie (green) in Trentino province (gray)

Giudicarie (also Val Giudicarie and Valli Giudicarie, German: Judikarien) is an area of Western Trentino, northern Italy, which includes the upper courses of the rivers Sarca and Chiese.

== Origin of the name ==
The term "Giudicarie", means "judicial districts" and goes back to legal traditions of the Middle Age. Actually the term Judicaria was used during the Lombard domination (6th-8th century) to indicate a certain kind of territorial districts descending from a previous Roman military organization. The first reference of this term applied to the territory of Giudicarie has been found in a testament of the Bishop Notecherius of Verona, datable to the year 927, where a Judicaria Summa Laganensis is mentioned. This entity encompassed a much larger territory that was reduced to the current extent of the seven districts (in Italian called: "Le Sette Pievi delle Giudicarie") in 1349 after a contract of sale between the Bishop of Trento and Mastino II della Scala. According to this contract, the territories of Riva and Tenno, Ledro, Tignale, Arco and the Cavedine valley was assigned to the Scaliger and ceased to be considered part of Giudicarie. The whole territory of Giudicarie was subordinate to the March of Trento since 927 and since 1027 to the Bishopric of Trent.

== Geography ==
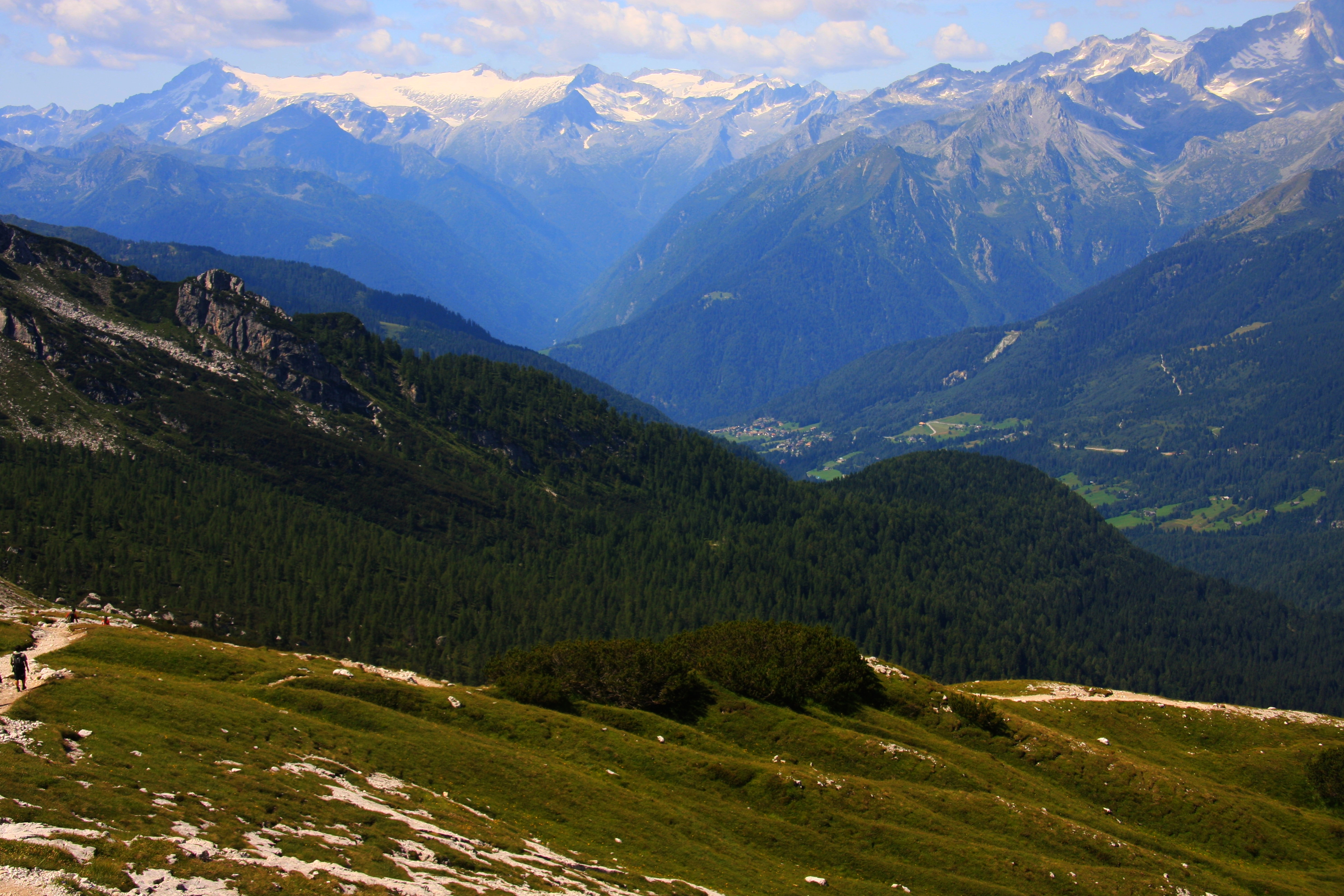
View off Val Rendena from Passo del Grosté; in the background Adamello-Presanella

The Giudicarie Valleys are located at the south-western tip of the Province of Trento and include the upper basin of the Chiese river and the Sarca river basin. The highest point of the territory is the Cima Presanella at an altitude of 3.558 m a.s.l. The Giudicarie are made up of a predominantly mountainous territory; the colonization almost exclusively concerns the valley floor and the foothills.

The territory is divided into inner Giudicarie (in Italian Giudicarie Interiori) and outer Giudicarie (Giudicarie Esteriori).

Inner Giudicarie include the area of:

- val Rendena (from Pass of Campo Carlo Magno to the Finale river),
- the "Busa" of Tione (from the Finale river to pass of Bondo and to the gorge of Ponte Pià - Pass of Durone),
- Chiese valley (from the pass of Bondo to the lake of Idro);

the Outer Giudicarie include the areas of:

- Banale (on the left bank of the Sarca river),
- Bleggio (on the right bank of the Sarca river and on the left bank of the Duina creek),
- Lomaso (on the right bank of the Sarca river and on the right bank of the Duina creek);
