= Blockhouse Pejo =

Austro-Hungarian fortification in Trentino, Italy

Coordinates: 46.3476°N 10.6427°E

Forte Barba di Fiori
- Forte Peio
- Part of Austro-Hungarian fortifications on the Italian border
- Peio, Trentino, Italy

Site information
- Type: Fortress
- Owner: Imperial Royal Army
- Controlled by: Austria-Hungary

Location
- Height: 1,610 m (5,282 ft)

Site history
- Built: 1906–1907
- Built by: Lieutenant of Engineers Maximilian Freuer

The Pejo Blockhouse, also called Forte Barba di Fiori or Forte Barbadifior, is an Austro-Hungarian fortification built in Northern Italy. Pejo had the job of guarding the Pejo Valley, it was supposed to have a sister fortification called “Montozzo” but it was never built. Some sources say the fort was built in 1880 while others say 1906-08. Pejo had the job of blocking an Italian advance in the case of the circumvention of the fortifications guarding the Tonale Pass. Pejo was armed with 2 8 cm field guns and 4 8mm machine guns. Pejo played no major part in World War I as it was located far to the rear of the fighting. In the 1930s Pejo was scrapped for steel for Mussolini’s war with Ethiopia.

The remains of the fort are located on the road leading from Peio to Lake Pian Palù, at an elevation of 1,610 meters, on the true right bank of the Noce stream.

This fortress, together with other fortresses near the Tonale Pass, formed the Tonale Barrier.

== History ==
The fort was part of Sub-rayon II. Its construction began between 1906 and 1907.

This fort, along with its twin—Fort Montozzo (which was never built)—was intended to block the Val di Peio in the event that the Italians decided to invade the Empire by bypassing the Tonale Pass.

The fort was designed by Engineer Lieutenant Maximilian Freuer, based on preliminary work by Lieutenant Kleiner and Captain Zeidler. Construction was supervised by Lieutenant Stanislaus Navratil and carried out by the firm of Giovanni Zontini from Riva del Garda.

In 1906, a decision was made to modernize the fort—which had by then become obsolete—but the work was never carried out.

The fort was equipped with various communication systems, enabling it to communicate with all the other forts in the defensive line via telephone and telegraph, as well as through an optical link with Fort Presanella (or Fort Pozzi Alti).

During the war, the fort generally served more as a small barracks than as a fort.

Left to fall into disrepair over many decades, the small fort was reduced to little more than a ruin, as no restoration work was ever carried out. Plans for its restoration and rehabilitation were jointly approved in 2014 by the municipalities of Peio—where the structure is located—and Pellizzano, the owner of the historic property.

Restoration work to promote and revitalize the fort began in June 2015 and is still ongoing as of August 2016.
