= Giustino, Trentino =

Giustino
- Comune
- Comune di Giustino
- Location within Italy Location within Trentino-Alto Adige/Südtirol
- Coordinates: 46°9′N 10°46′E
- Country: Italy
- Region: Trentino-Alto Adige/Südtirol
- Province: Trentino (TN)

Government
  - Mayor: Manuel Cosi

Area
  - Total: 40.1 km^{2} (15.5 sq mi)
- Elevation: 770 m (2,530 ft)

Population (2026)
  - Total: 752
  - Density: 18.8/km^{2} (48.6/sq mi)
- Time zone: UTC+1 (CET)
  - Summer (DST): UTC+2 (CEST)
- Postal code: 38086
- Dialing code: 0465
- Website: Official website

Giustino (Giustin in local dialect) is a comune (municipality) in Trentino in the northern Italian region Trentino-Alto Adige/Südtirol, located about 30 kilometres (19 mi) northwest of Trento. As of 31 December 2004, it had a population of 748 and an area of 40.1 square kilometres (15.5 mi^{2}).

Giustino borders the following municipalities: Vermiglio, Pinzolo, Spiazzo, Strembo, Carisolo, Caderzone, Massimeno, Stenico and Comano Terme.

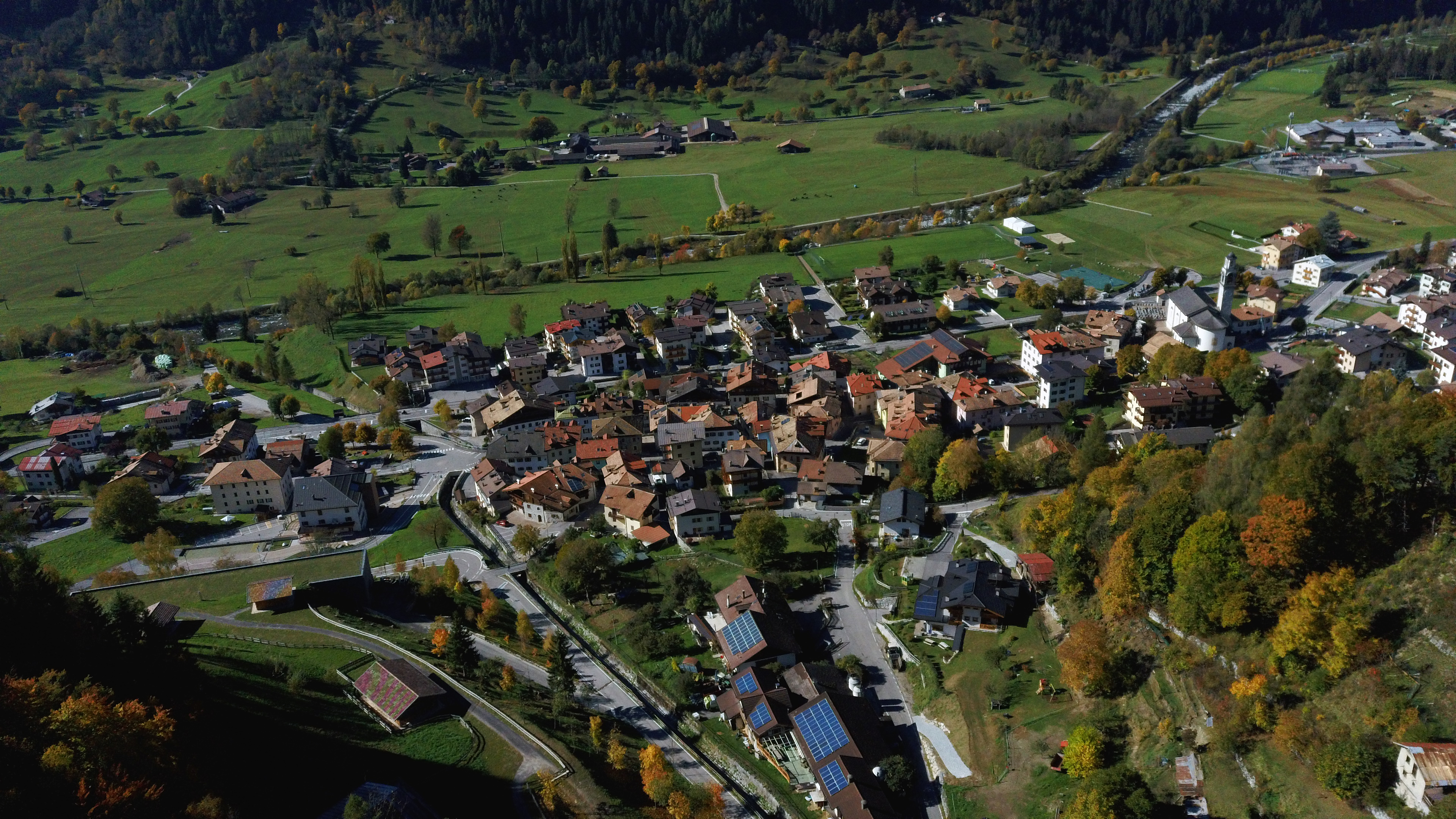
Giustino, Trentino, Italy

== Demographic evolution ==
Historical population

Year	Pop.	±%
1861	?	—
1871	?	—
1881	?	—
1901	?	—
1911	?	—

Year	Pop.	±%
1921	542	—
1931	496	−8.5%
1936	432	−12.9%
1951	467	+8.1%
1961	507	+8.6%

Year	Pop.	±%
1971	549	+8.3%
1981	539	−1.8%
1991	645	+19.7%
2001	694	+7.6%

Source: Data from ISTAT
