= Vigilius of Trent =

Christian bishop, martyr and saint (353–405)

Saint Vigilius of Trent
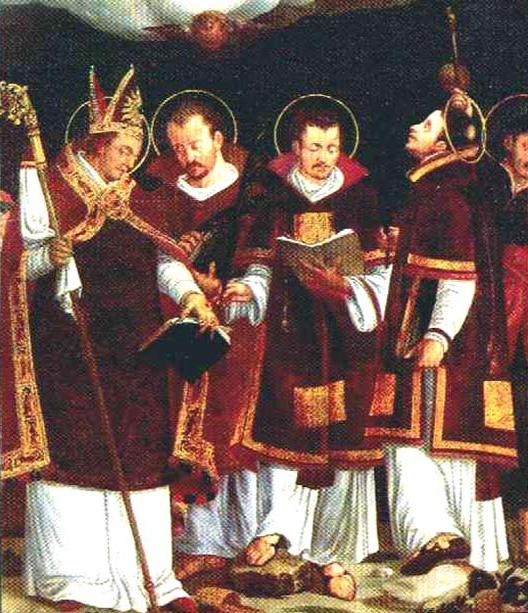
- Saint Virgilius, and martyrs Sisinnius, Martyrius and Alexander. Paolo Naurizio, 1583.

Bishop and martyr
- Born: c. 353 possibly Trent
- Died: 26 June 405 (aged 51–52); Rendena
- Venerated in: Roman Catholic Church; Eastern Orthodox Church
- Major shrine: Trent
- Feast: 26 June
- Attributes: bishop holding a shoe; wooden clogs (Holzschuh)
- Patronage: Trent; Tyrol; mining and mines; Diocese of Bolzano

Vigilius of Trent (Italian: San Vigilio di Trento; German: Vigilius von Trient; c. 353 – 26 June 405) is venerated as the patron saint and bishop of Trent.

== Life ==
According to tradition, he was a Roman patrician, the son of Maxentia and a man whose name is sometimes given as Theodosius. His brothers, Claudian and Magorian, are also venerated as saints. Vigilius was educated at Athens and seems to have been a friend of John Chrysostom.

In 380, Vigilius settled in the city of Trent and was chosen as the city's bishop. He may have been consecrated by either Ambrose of Milan or Valerian (Valerianus) of Aquileia. Ambrose donated the episcopal insignia and showed a paternal solicitude for Vigilius. As bishop, Vigilius attempted to convert Arians and pagans to Nicene Christianity and is said to have founded thirty parishes in his diocese. He is traditionally regarded as the founder of the Church of Santa Maria Maggiore in Trent. A letter attributed to Ambrose encourages Vigilius to oppose marriages between Christians and pagans. Vigilius also preached in Brescia and Verona, which lay outside of his diocese.

His companions during his missions were Sisinnius, Martyrius and Alexander (Sisinnio, Martirio e Alessandro), who were sent by Ambrose to assist Vigilius. Tradition makes these three natives of Cappadocia. A work called De Martyrio SS. Sisinnii, Martyrii et Alexandri is attributed to Vigilius.

In 397, Sisinnius, Martyrius and Alexander were killed at Sanzeno after they attempted to convert the local population there to Christianity. Vigilius forgave their killers and had the remains of the three men sent to John Chrysostom in Constantinople, as well as to Simplician, Ambrose's successor, in Milan. Milan would later give some of those relics back to Sanzeno in the 20th century, where they rest in the Basilica dei Santi Martiri.

Vigilius is associated with the legend of Romedius, who is often depicted alongside or astride a bear. According to Romedius' hagiography, Romedius once wished to visit Vigilius, a friend of his youth, but Romedius' horse was torn to pieces by a wild bear. Romedius, however, had the bear bridled by his disciple David (Davide). The bear became docile and carried Romedius on its back to Trent.

== Death ==
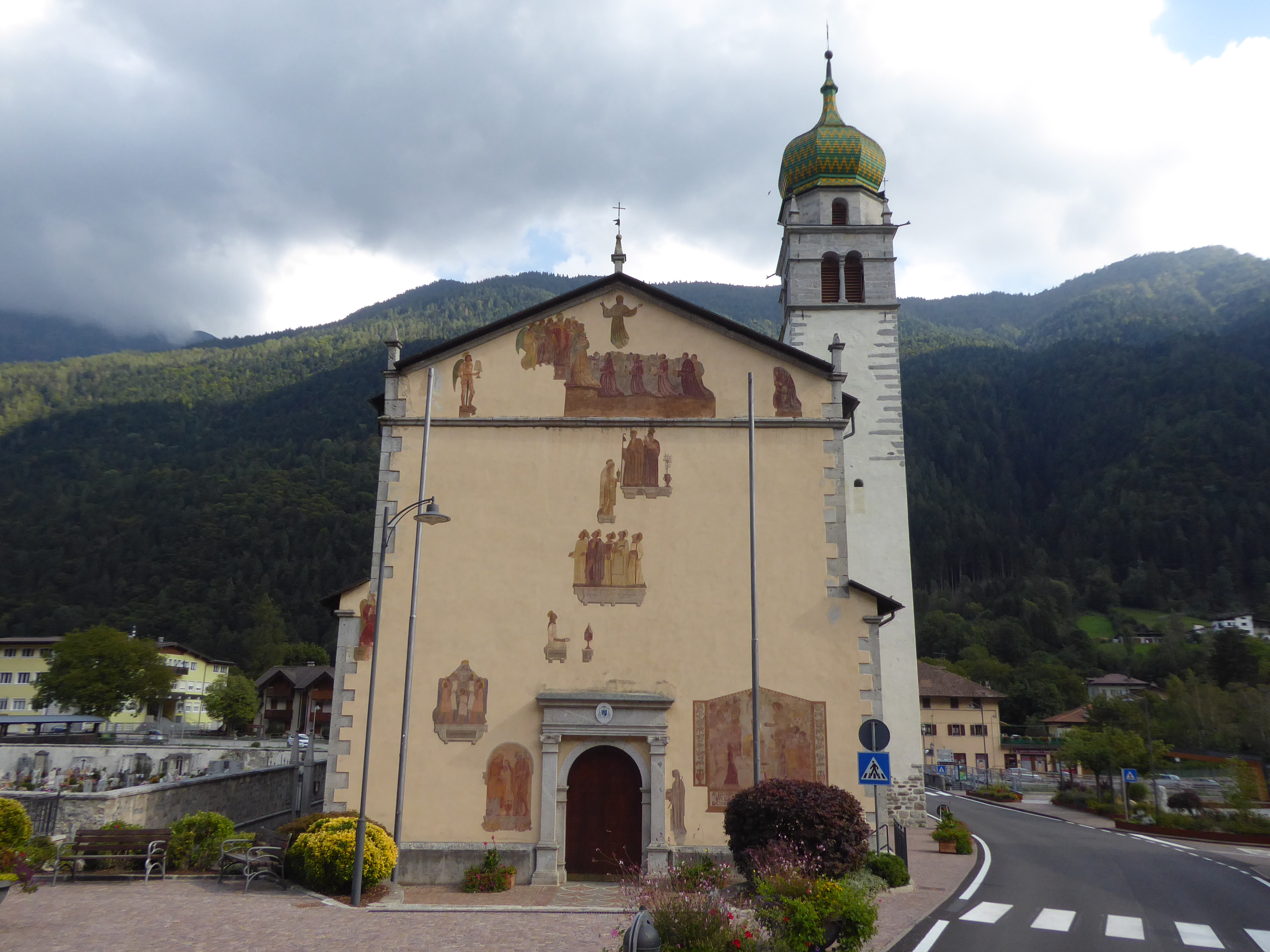
Saint Vigilius church in Spiazzo, said to be built on the place where Vigilius was killed

According to a much later tradition, Vigilius, who had been accompanied by his brothers Claudian and Magorian as well as a priest named Julian, was killed in the present-day parish of Rendena, in the Rendena Valley, where he had been preaching to the locals there, who worshipped the god Saturn. Vigilius said Mass and overturned a statue of the god into the Sarca River. As punishment, he was stoned to death.

A statue of the god Neptune stands atop a fountain in front of Vigilius' shrine in Trent today.

== Veneration ==
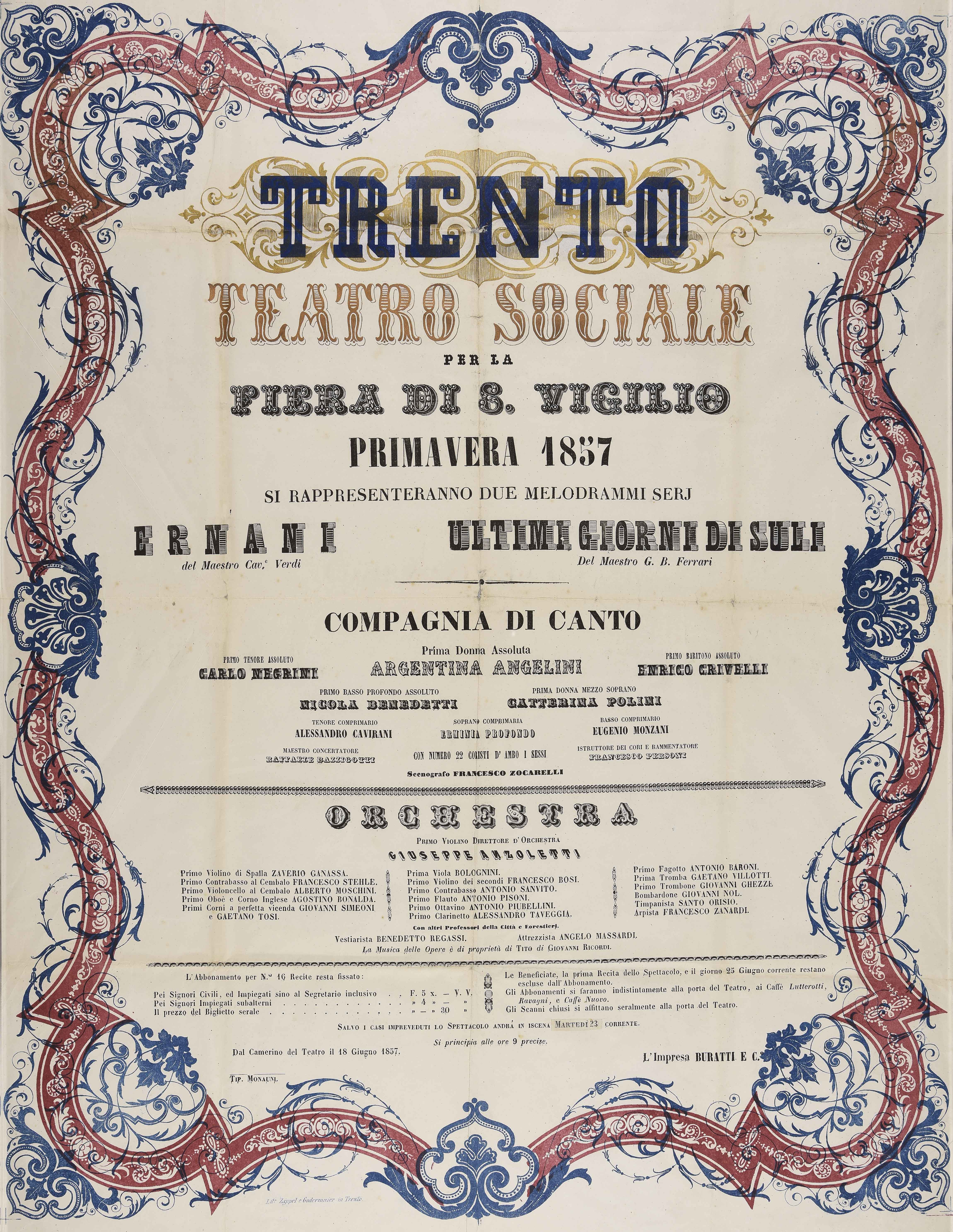
Theatre playbill for the S. Vigilio Fair in 1857, preserved in the Municipal Library of Trento

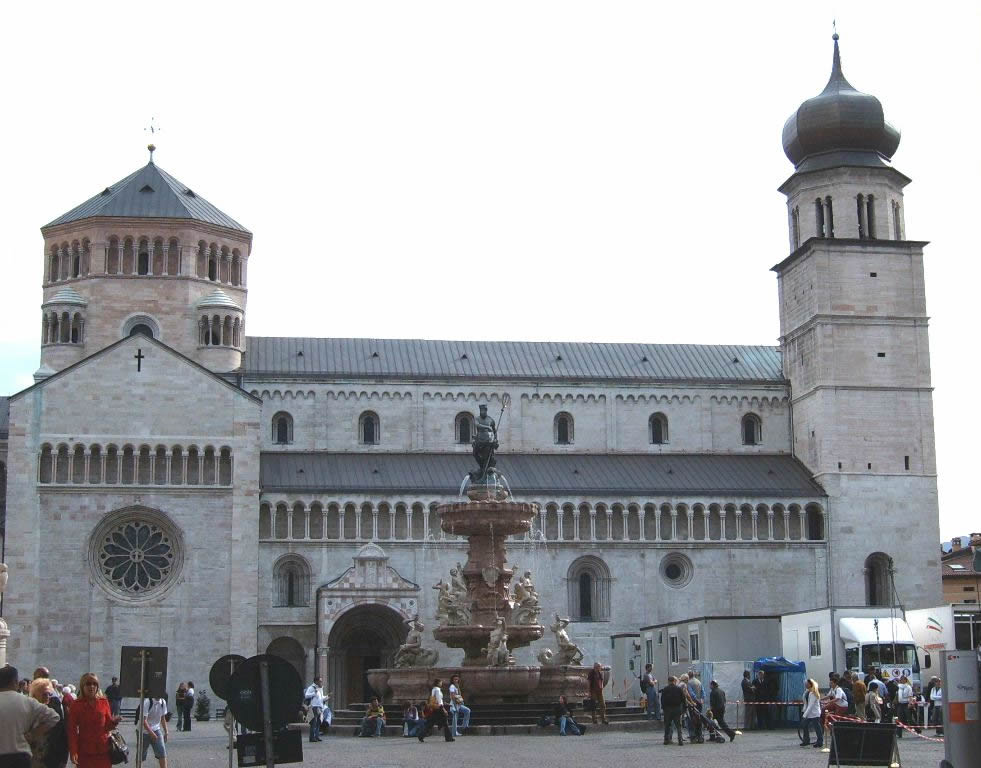
Trent Cathedral with the Fountain of Neptune

Vigilius was buried at a church that he built at Trent, later expanded by his successor Eugippius, and dedicated to Vigilius. This became Trento Cathedral. He was immediately venerated after his death, and the acts of his life and death were sent to Rome, and Pope Innocent I, according to the Catholic Encyclopedia, "seems to have made a formal canonization, for Benedict XIV calls Vigilius the first martyr canonized by a pope."

Vigilius' arm was removed as a separate relic and placed into its own reliquary in 1386. He is venerated in Tyrol. A German farmers' saying associated with a 2nd feast day of 31 January was: "Friert es zu Vigilius / im März die Eiseskälte kommen muss!" ("If it freezes on St. Vigilius' Day, frost will come in March!"). There are similar sayings associated with other "weather saints".

== See also ==
- Maximus of Turin
