= Ossana =

- Comune
- Comune di Ossana
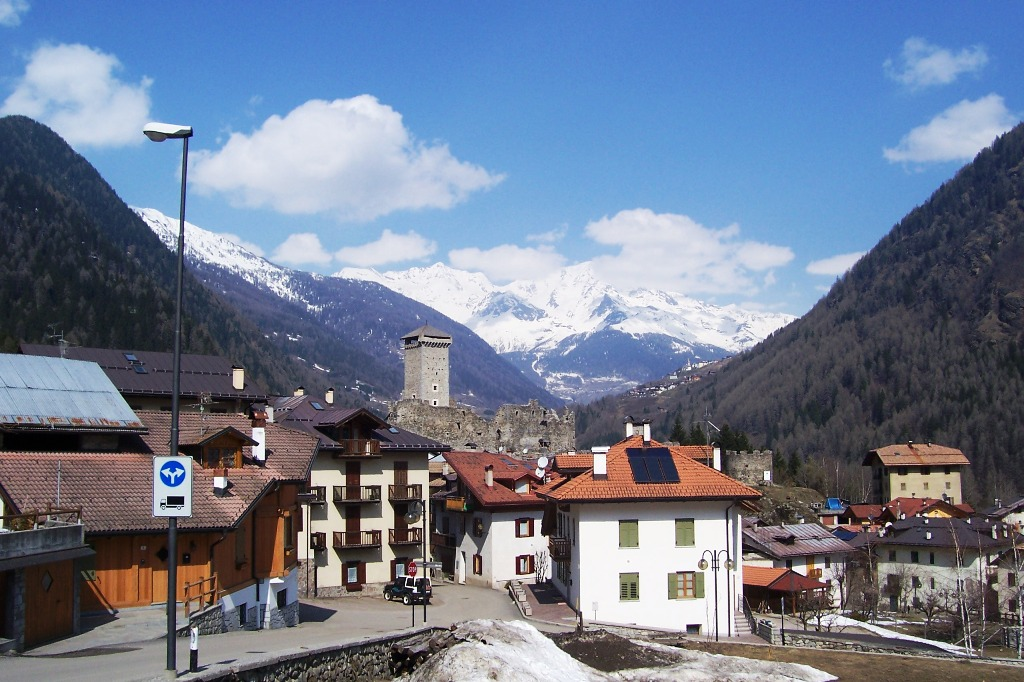
- Panorama of Ossana

- Location within Italy Location within Trentino-Alto Adige/Südtirol
- Coordinates: 46°18′N 10°44′E
- Country: Italy
- Region: Trentino-Alto Adige/Südtirol
- Province: Trentino (TN)
- Frazioni: Ossana, Cusiano, Fucine

Government
  - Mayor: Laura Marinelli

Area
  - Total: 25.2 km^{2} (9.7 sq mi)

Population (2026)
  - Total: 826
  - Density: 32.8/km^{2} (84.9/sq mi)
- Time zone: UTC+1 (CET)
  - Summer (DST): UTC+2 (CEST)
- Postal code: 38026
- Dialing code: 0463
- Website: Official website

Ossana is a comune (municipality) in Trentino in the northern Italian region Trentino-Alto Adige/Südtirol, located about 40 kilometres (25 mi) northwest of Trento. As of 31 December 2004, it had a population of 786 and an area of 25.2 square kilometres (9.7 mi^{2}).

The municipality of Ossana contains the frazioni (subdivisions, mainly villages and hamlets) Ossana, Cusiano and Fucine. Ossana borders the following municipalities: Peio, Vermiglio, Pellizzano, Pinzolo and Carisolo. It is one of I Borghi più belli d'Italia ("The most beautiful villages of Italy").

== Demographic evolution ==
Historical population

Year	Pop.	±%
1861	?	—
1871	?	—
1881	?	—
1901	?	—
1911	?	—

Year	Pop.	±%
1921	766	—
1931	797	+4.0%
1936	780	−2.1%
1951	853	+9.4%
1961	886	+3.9%

Year	Pop.	±%
1971	791	−10.7%
1981	729	−7.8%
1991	709	−2.7%
2001	765	+7.9%

Source: Data from ISTAT
