= Vermiglio =

- Comune
- Comune di Vermiglio
- Location within Italy Location within Trentino-Alto Adige/Südtirol
- Coordinates: 46°18′N 10°41′E
- Country: Italy
- Region: Trentino-Alto Adige/Südtirol
- Province: Trento (TN)
- Frazioni: Pizzano, Fraviano, Cortina, Borgonuovo, Stavel, Velon, Passo del Tonale

Government
  - Mayor: Michele Bertolini

Area
  - Total: 103.7 km^{2} (40.0 sq mi)
- Elevation: 1,261 m (4,137 ft)

Population (Dec. 2004)
  - Total: 1,884
  - Density: 18.17/km^{2} (47.05/sq mi)
- Demonym: Vermigliani
- Time zone: UTC+1 (CET)
  - Summer (DST): UTC+2 (CEST)
- Postal code: 38029
- Dialing code: 0463
- Website: Official website

Vermiglio (local dialect: Verméi) is a comune (municipality) in the province of Trento in the northern Italian region Trentino-Alto Adige/Südtirol, located about 40 kilometres (25 mi) northwest of the city of Trento. As of 31 December 2004, it had a population of 1,884 and an area of 103.7 square kilometres (40.0 mi^{2}).

The municipality of Vermiglio contains the frazioni (subdivisions, mainly villages and hamlets) Pizzano, Fraviano, Cortina, Borgonuovo, Stavel, Velon and Passo del Tonale.

Vermiglio borders the following municipalities: Peio, Ponte di Legno, Ossana, Pellizzano, Giustino, Spiazzo, Strembo and Carisolo.

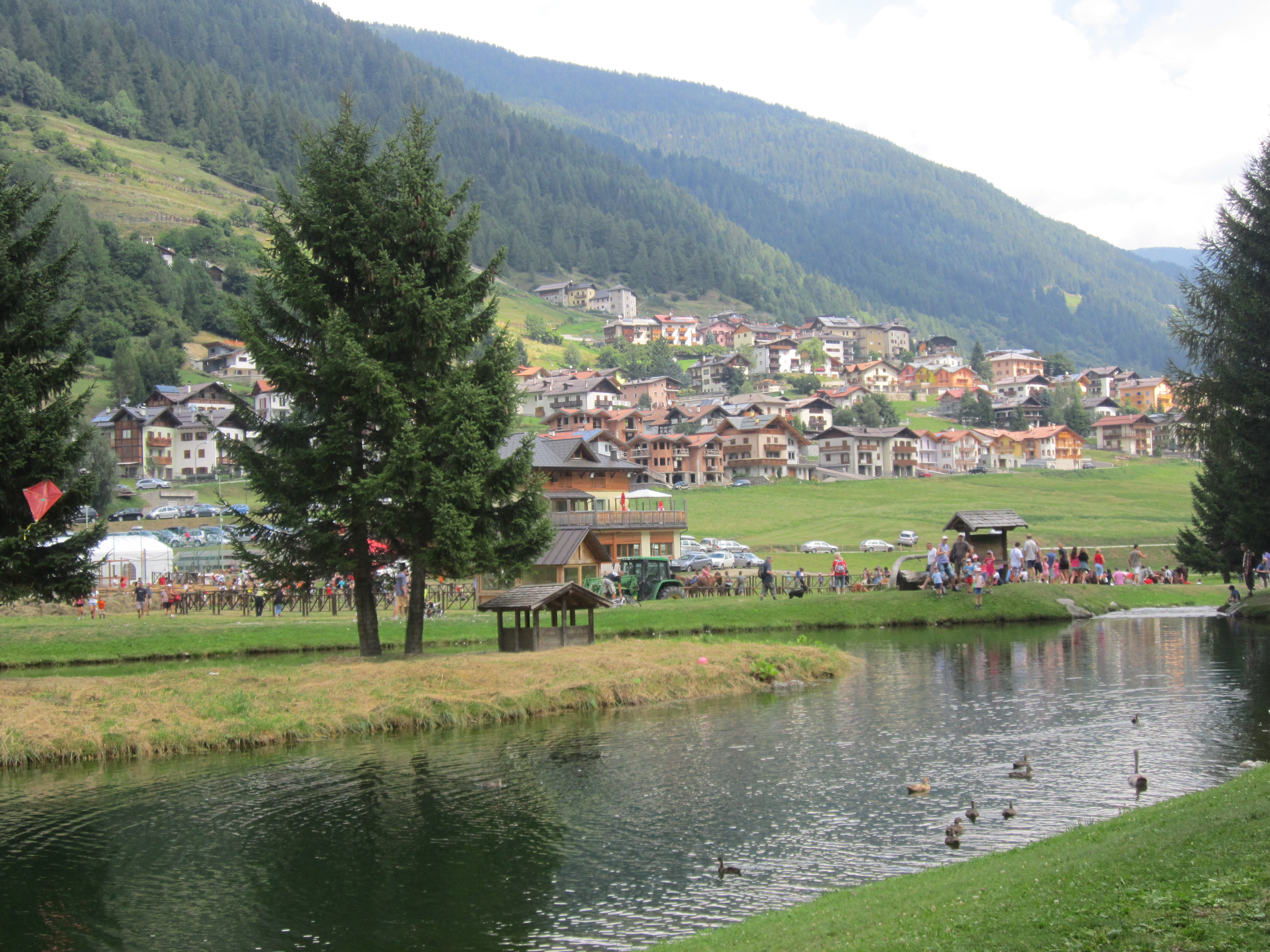
Vermiglio lake

== Demographic evolution ==
Historical population

| Year | Pop. | ±% |
|---|---|---|
| 1861 | ? | — |
| 1871 | ? | — |
| 1881 | ? | — |
| 1901 | ? | — |
| 1911 | ? | — |

| Year | Pop. | ±% |
|---|---|---|
| 1921 | 1,768 | — |
| 1931 | 1,980 | +12.0% |
| 1936 | 2,020 | +2.0% |
| 1951 | 2,157 | +6.8% |
| 1961 | 2,073 | −3.9% |

| Year | Pop. | ±% |
|---|---|---|
| 1971 | 1,856 | −10.5% |
| 1981 | 1,709 | −7.9% |
| 1991 | 1,743 | +2.0% |
| 2001 | 1,856 | +6.5% |

Source: Data from ISTAT
