= Pelugo =

- Comune
- Comune di Pelugo
- Location within Italy Location within Trentino-Alto Adige/Südtirol
- Coordinates: 46°5′N 10°43′E
- Country: Italy
- Region: Trentino-Alto Adige/Südtirol
- Province: Trentino (TN)

Government
  - Mayor: Paola Chiodega

Area
  - Total: 22.9 km^{2} (8.8 sq mi)
- Elevation: 675 m (2,215 ft)

Population (Dec. 2004)
  - Total: 394
  - Density: 17.2/km^{2} (44.6/sq mi)
- Demonym: Pelughi
- Time zone: UTC+1 (CET)
  - Summer (DST): UTC+2 (CEST)
- Postal code: 38088
- Dialing code: 0465
- Website: Official website

Pelugo (Pilùch in local dialect) is a comune (municipality) in Trentino in the northern Italian region Trentino-Alto Adige/Südtirol, located about 30 kilometres (19 mi) west of Trento. As of 31 December 2004, it had a population of 394 and an area of 22.9 square kilometres (8.8 mi^{2}).

Pelugo borders the following municipalities: Spiazzo, Massimeno, Daone, Montagne, Villa Rendena and Vigo Rendena.

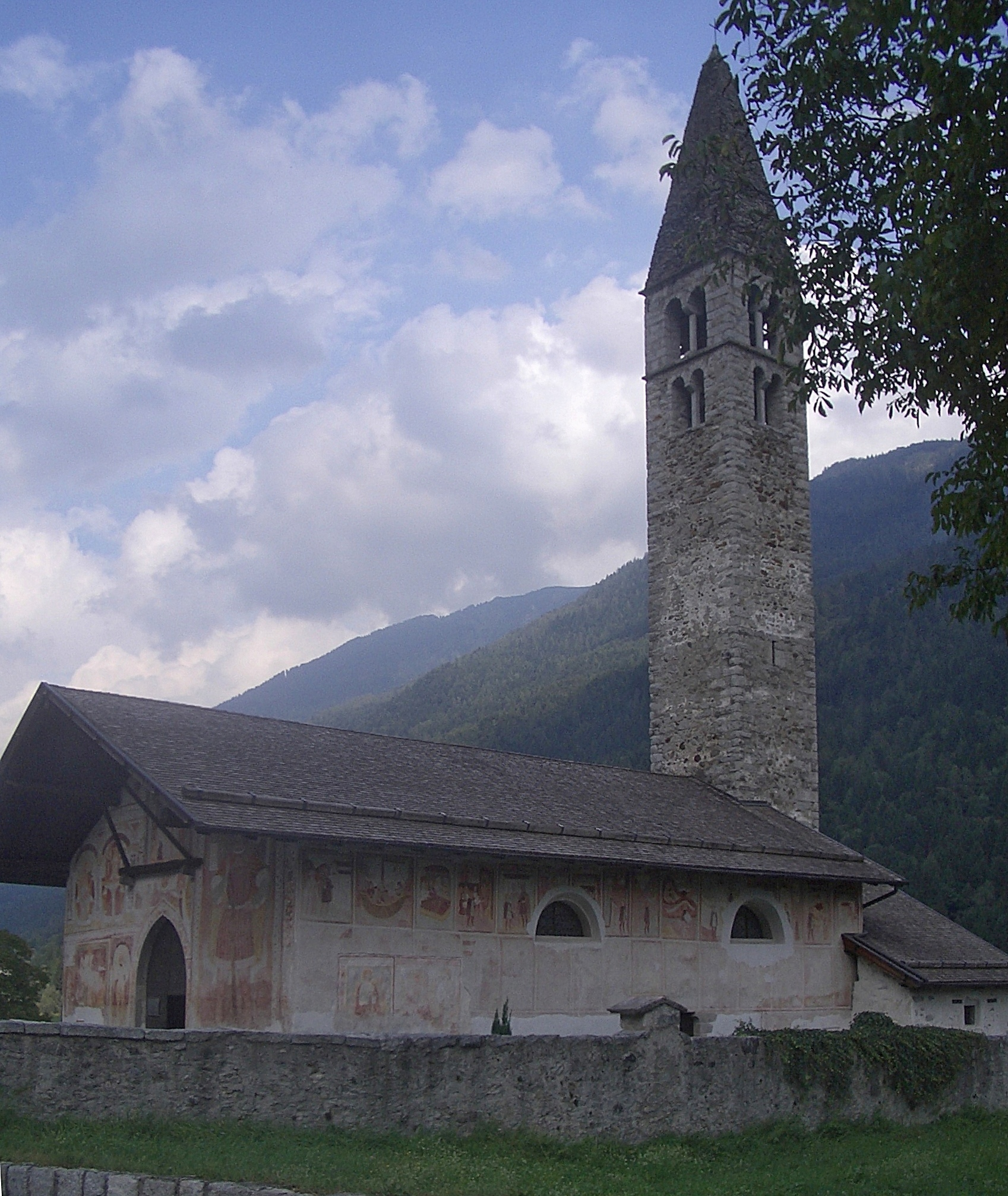
Sant Antonio Abate church

== Demographic evolution ==
Historical population

| Year | Pop. | ±% |
|---|---|---|
| 1861 | ? | — |
| 1871 | ? | — |
| 1881 | ? | — |
| 1901 | ? | — |
| 1911 | ? | — |

| Year | Pop. | ±% |
|---|---|---|
| 1921 | 401 | — |
| 1931 | 356 | −11.2% |
| 1936 | 334 | −6.2% |
| 1951 | 336 | +0.6% |
| 1961 | 333 | −0.9% |

| Year | Pop. | ±% |
|---|---|---|
| 1971 | 297 | −10.8% |
| 1981 | 301 | +1.3% |
| 1991 | 311 | +3.3% |
| 2001 | 351 | +12.9% |

Source: Data from ISTAT
