= Strembo =

- Comune
- Comune di Strembo
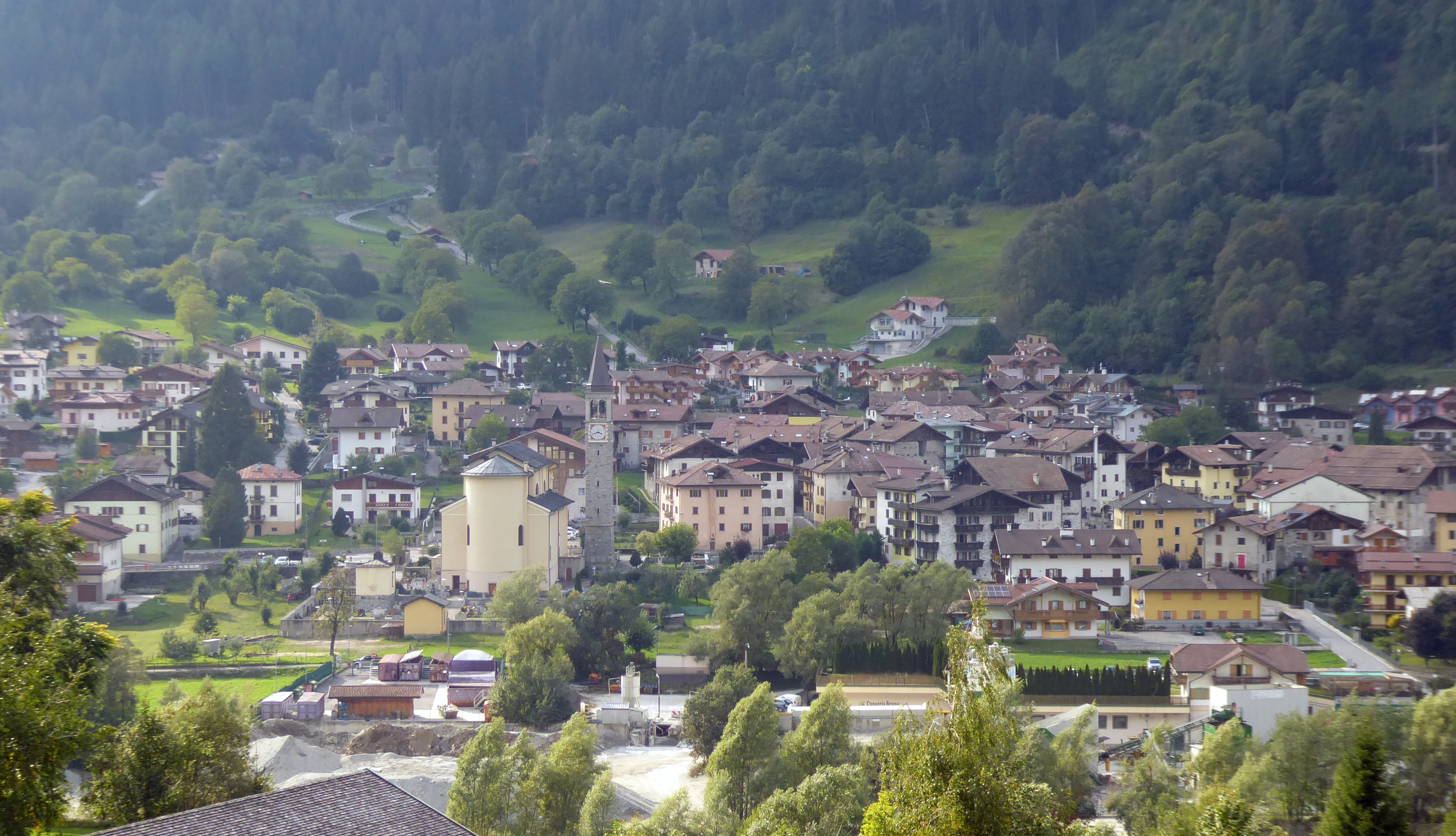

- Location within Italy Location within Trentino-Alto Adige/Südtirol
- Coordinates: 46°7′N 10°45′E
- Country: Italy
- Region: Trentino-Alto Adige/Südtirol
- Province: Trentino (TN)

Government
  - Mayor: Manuel Dino Gritti

Area
  - Total: 38.3 km^{2} (14.8 sq mi)

Population (Dec. 2004)
  - Total: 490
  - Density: 13/km^{2} (33/sq mi)
- Time zone: UTC+1 (CET)
  - Summer (DST): UTC+2 (CEST)
- Postal code: 38080
- Dialing code: 0465
- Website: Official website

Strembo (Stremp in local dialect) is a comune (municipality) in Trentino in the northern Italian region of Trentino-Alto Adige/Südtirol, located about 30 kilometres (19 mi) west of Trento. As of 31 December 2004, it had a population of 490 and an area of 38.3 square kilometres (14.8 mi^{2}).

Strembo borders the following municipalities: Vermiglio, Giustino, Spiazzo, Caderzone, Massimeno, Daone and Bocenago.

== Demographic evolution ==
Historical population

Year	Pop.	±%
1861	?	—
1871	?	—
1881	?	—
1901	?	—
1911	?	—

Year	Pop.	±%
1921	720	—
1931	481	−33.2%
1936	376	−21.8%
1951	383	+1.9%
1961	355	−7.3%

Year	Pop.	±%
1971	364	+2.5%
1981	406	+11.5%
1991	407	+0.2%
2001	452	+11.1%

Source: Data from ISTAT
