= Bocenago =

- Comune
- Comune di Bocenago
- Location within Italy Location within Trentino-Alto Adige/Südtirol
- Coordinates: 46°7′N 10°45′E
- Country: Italy
- Region: Trentino-Alto Adige/Südtirol
- Province: Trentino (TN)

Government
  - Mayor: Maurizio Fantato

Area
  - Total: 8.5 km^{2} (3.3 sq mi)
- Elevation: 750 m (2,460 ft)

Population (2026)
  - Total: 410
  - Density: 48/km^{2} (120/sq mi)
- Time zone: UTC+1 (CET)
  - Summer (DST): UTC+2 (CEST)
- Postal code: 38080
- Dialing code: 0465
- Website: Official website

Bocenago (Buzanàc or Bozanàc in local dialect) is a comune (municipality) in Trentino in the northern Italian region Trentino-Alto Adige/Südtirol, located about 30 kilometres (19 mi) west of Trento. As of 31 December 2004, it had a population of 394 and an area of 8.5 square kilometres (3.3 mi^{2}).

Bocenago borders the following municipalities: Spiazzo, Strembo, Caderzone, Massimeno, Stenico, Montagne, and Comano Terme.

The ten most common surnames in Bocenago are Alberti, Boroni, Riccadonna, Franzelli, Ferrazza, Fostini, Botteri, Cavoli, Bonafini, and Maffei.

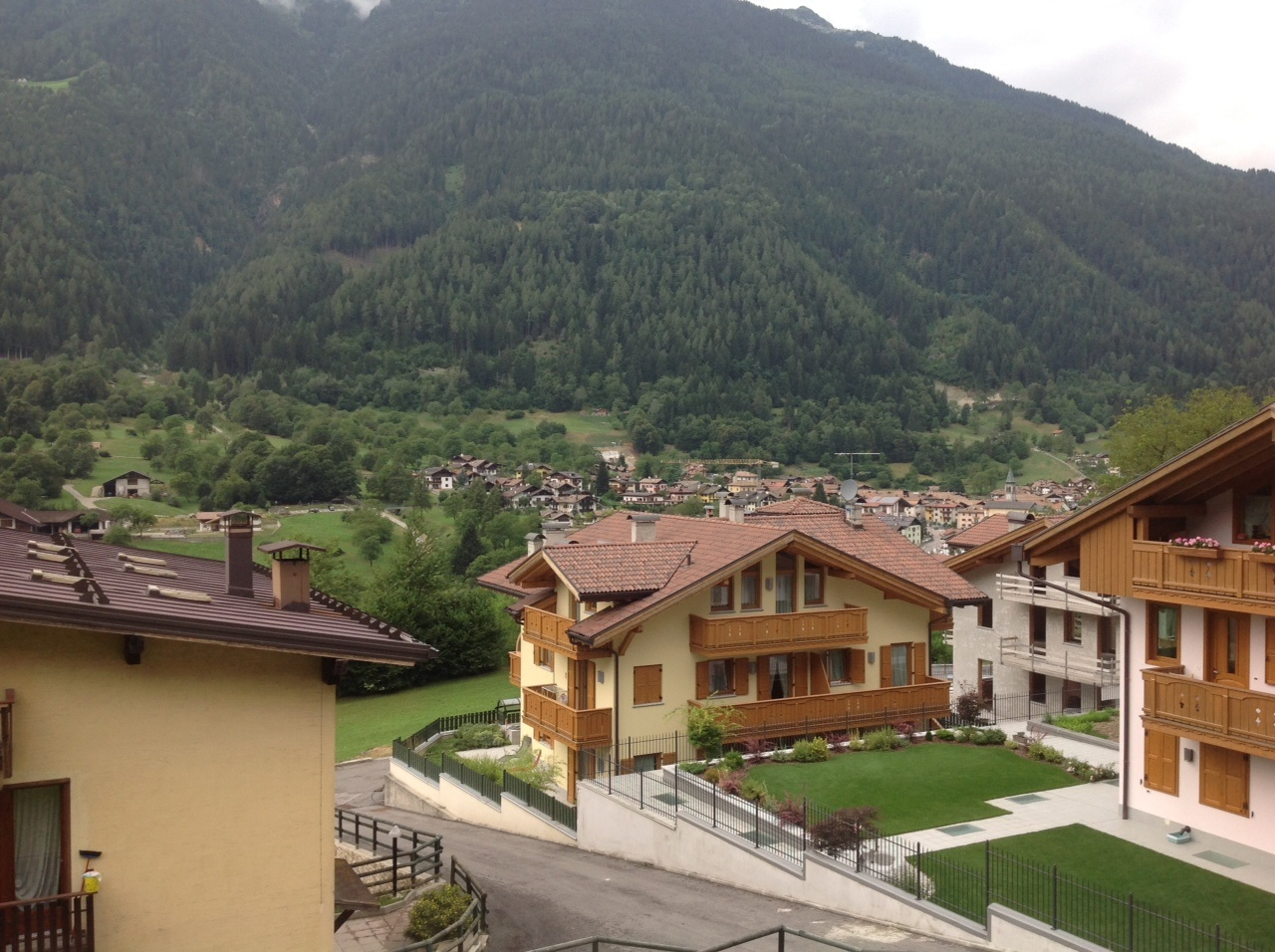
Panorama of Bocenago seen from an apartment

== Demographic evolution ==
Historical population

Year	Pop.	±%
1861	?	—
1871	?	—
1881	?	—
1901	?	—
1911	?	—

Year	Pop.	±%
1921	633	—
1931	413	−34.8%
1936	370	−10.4%
1951	346	−6.5%
1961	369	+6.6%

Year	Pop.	±%
1971	307	−16.8%
1981	300	−2.3%
1991	319	+6.3%
2001	372	+16.6%

Source: Data from ISTAT
