= Pellizzano =

- Comune
- Comune di Pellizzano
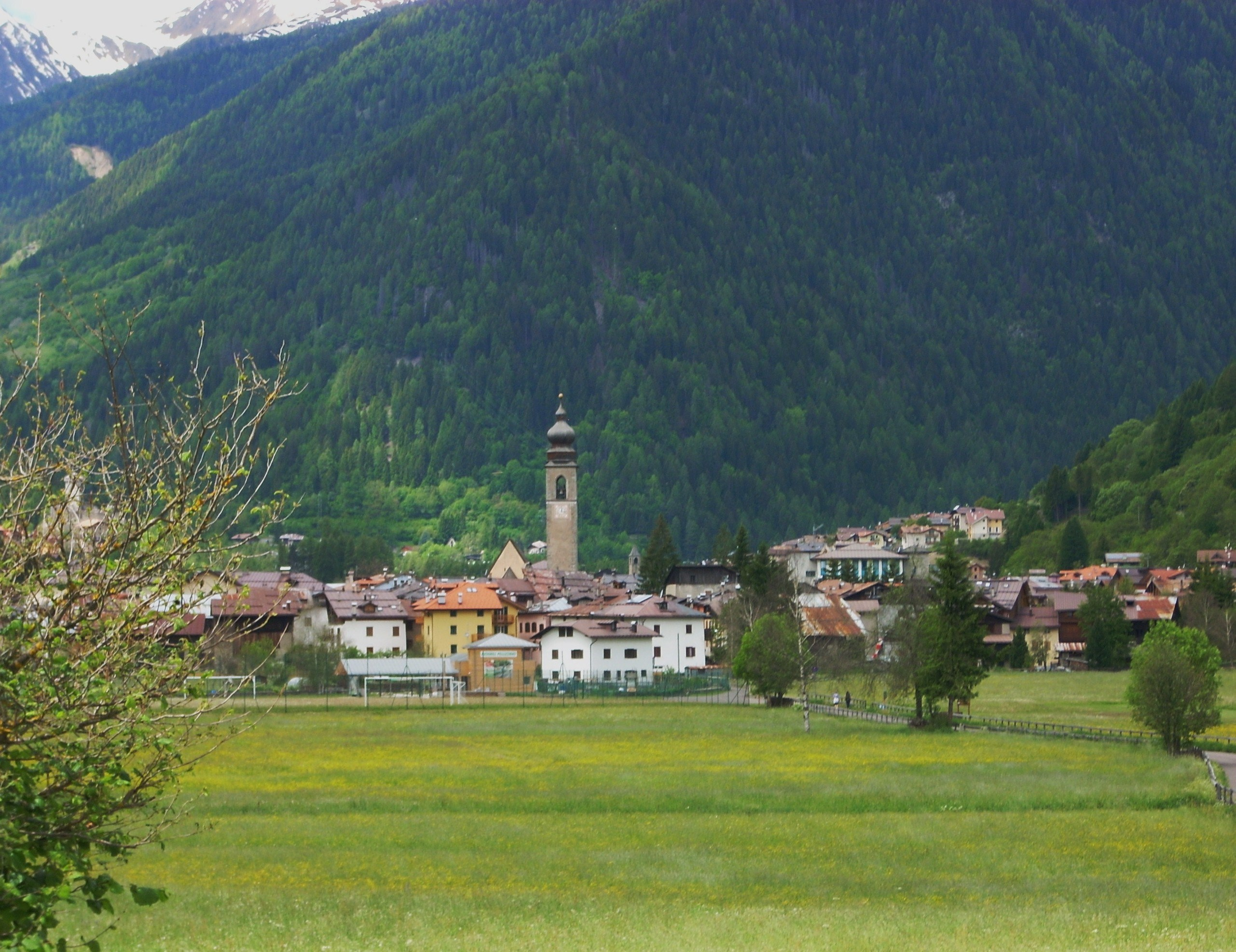
- Panorama of Pellizzano

- Coat of arms

- Location within Italy Location within Trentino-Alto Adige/Südtirol
- Coordinates: 46°19′N 10°45′E
- Country: Italy
- Region: Trentino-Alto Adige/Südtirol
- Province: Trentino (TN)

Government
  - Mayor: Francesca Tomaselli

Area
  - Total: 39.9 km^{2} (15.4 sq mi)

Population (30 April 2009)
  - Total: 774
  - Density: 19.4/km^{2} (50.2/sq mi)
- Demonym: Plicianèti
- Time zone: UTC+1 (CET)
  - Summer (DST): UTC+2 (CEST)
- Postal code: 38020
- Dialing code: 0463
- Website: Official website

Pellizzano (Plicià in local dialect) is a comune (municipality) in Trentino in the northern Italian region Trentino-Alto Adige/Südtirol, located about 40 kilometres (25 mi) northwest of Trento.

Pellizzano borders the following municipalities: Rabbi, Peio, Mezzana, Vermiglio, Ossana and Pinzolo.
