= Carisolo =

- Comune
- Comune di Carisolo
- Location within Italy Location within Trentino-Alto Adige/Südtirol
- Coordinates: 46°10′N 10°46′E
- Country: Italy
- Region: Trentino-Alto Adige/Südtirol
- Province: Trentino (TN)

Government
  - Mayor: Dario Polli

Area
  - Total: 24.7 km^{2} (9.5 sq mi)

Population (2026)
  - Total: 895
  - Density: 36.2/km^{2} (93.8/sq mi)
- Time zone: UTC+1 (CET)
  - Summer (DST): UTC+2 (CEST)
- Postal code: 38080
- Dialing code: 0465
- ISTAT code: 022042
- Website: Official website

Carisolo (Carisöl in local dialect) is a comune (municipality) in Trentino in the northern Italian region Trentino-Alto Adige/Südtirol, located about 30 kilometres (19 mi) northwest of Trento. As of 31 December 2004, it had a population of 936 and an area of 24.7 square kilometres (9.5 mi^{2}).

Carisolo borders the following municipalities: Vermiglio, Ossana, Pinzolo, Giustino, and Caderzone.

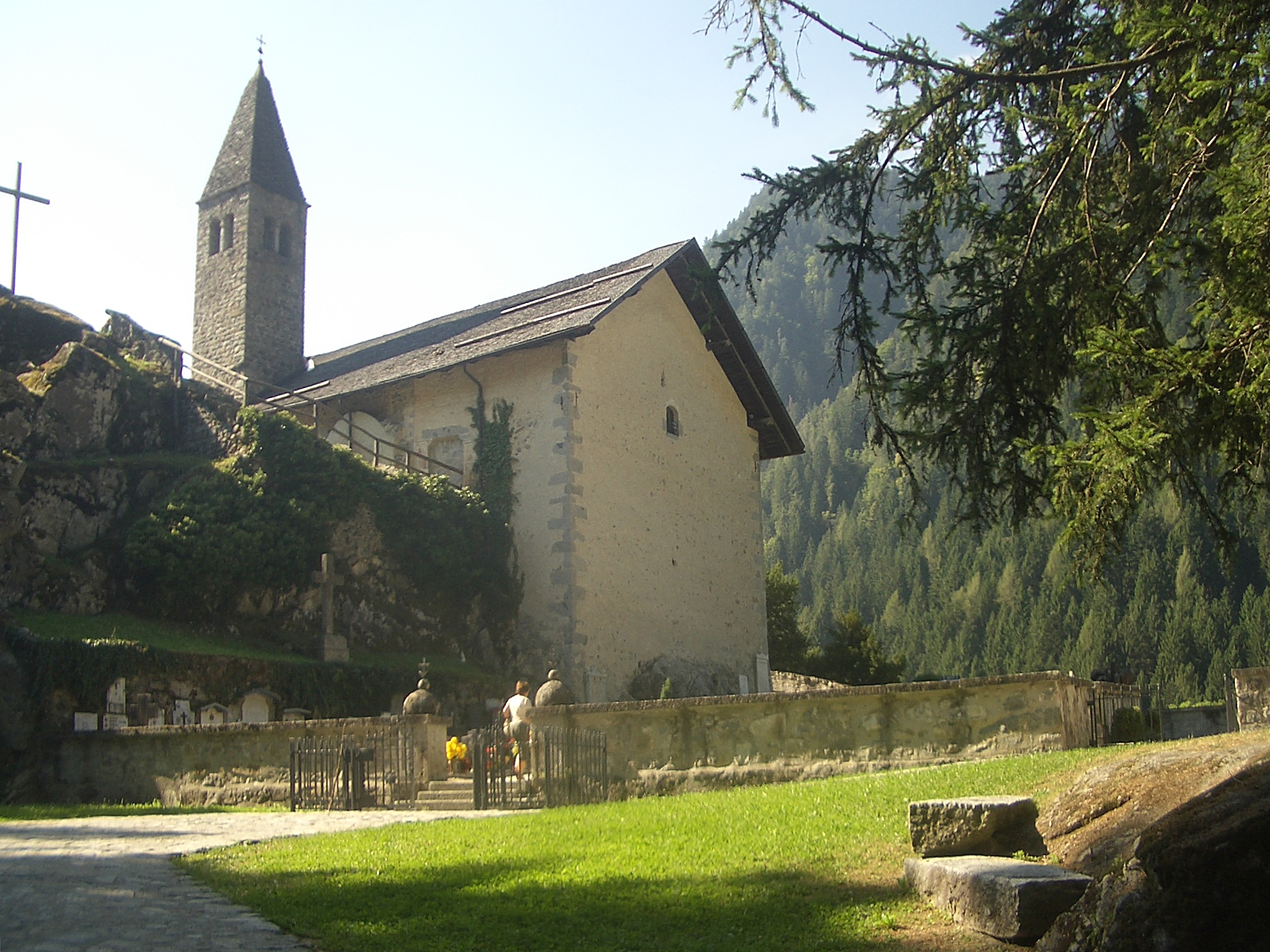
Santo Stefano church

== Demographic evolution ==
Historical population

Year	Pop.	±%
1861	?	—
1871	?	—
1881	?	—
1901	?	—
1911	?	—

Year	Pop.	±%
1921	530	—
1931	503	−5.1%
1936	477	−5.2%
1951	560	+17.4%
1961	560	+0.0%

Year	Pop.	±%
1971	624	+11.4%
1981	758	+21.5%
1991	807	+6.5%
2001	918	+13.8%

Source: Data from ISTAT
