= Peio =

- Comune
- Comune di Peio
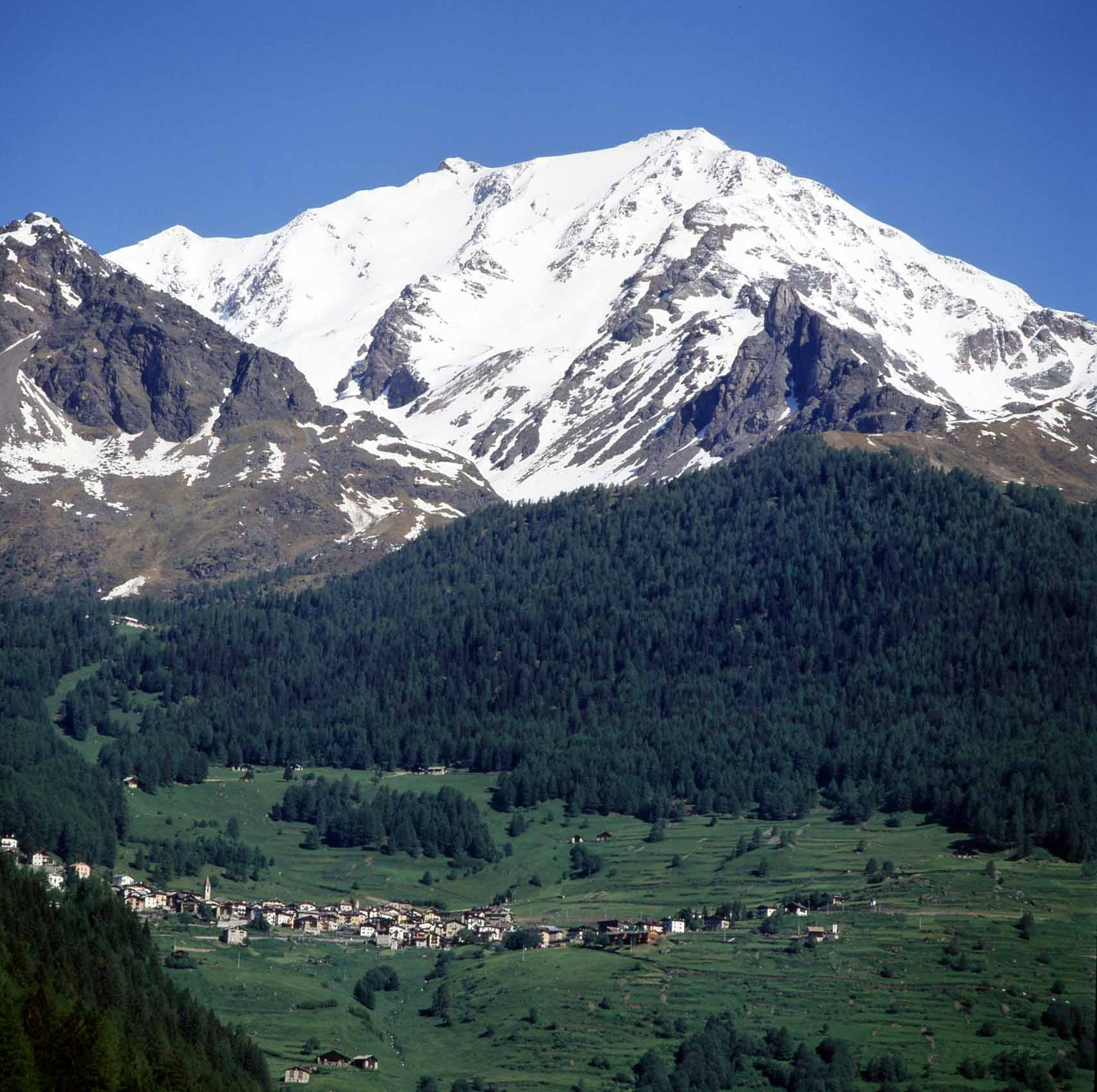
- Mount Vioz and Peio

- Location within Italy Location within Trentino-Alto Adige/Südtirol
- Coordinates: 46°22′N 10°40′E
- Country: Italy
- Region: Trentino-Alto Adige/Südtirol
- Province: Trentino (TN)

Government
  - Mayor: Luca Veneri

Area
  - Total: 162.3 km^{2} (62.7 sq mi)
- Elevation: 1,585 m (5,200 ft)

Population (Aug. 2016)
  - Total: 1,845
  - Density: 11.37/km^{2} (29.44/sq mi)
- Demonym: Pegaési
- Time zone: UTC+1 (CET)
  - Summer (DST): UTC+2 (CEST)
- Postal code: 38024
- Dialing code: 0463
- Website: Official website

Peio (Péi in local dialect) is a comune (municipality) in Trentino in the northern Italian region Trentino-Alto Adige/Südtirol, located about 80 kilometres (50 mi) northwest of Trento. As of 31 December 2004, it had a population of 1,892 and an area of 162.3 square kilometres (62.7 mi^{2}).

Peio borders the following municipalities: Martell, Valfurva, Rabbi, Ponte di Legno, Vermiglio, Ossana and Pellizzano.

== History ==
Until the end of World War I (1918) Peio, as the whole region, was part of the Austro-Hungarian Empire; the border between the Empire and the Kingdom of Italy was in the mountains over Peio, where a hard war took place, among cliffs, snow and glaciers. Even today, thanks to the melting of glaciers, can be found pieces of army equipment. A small museum in Peio shows them, together with filmed documents of those battles.

Peio was, till recent decades, a hamlet in the mountains, which sustained itself on agriculture and cattle raising. Since 1970 a rapid development began, making Peio a ski resort and a centre dedicated to wellness. Peio valley is rich in mineral waters, which now are exploited not only to produce bottled water but also for therapeutic purposes.

Another important factor of Peio's touristic development is its location in Stelvio National Park, a vast mountain zone where vegetal and animal biodiversity is strictly preserved. Easy walks and more difficult trekking routes allow visitors to explore valleys and woodlands from Passo del Tonale to Ortles.

== Demographic evolution ==
Historical population

Year	Pop.	±%
1861	?	—
1871	?	—
1881	?	—
1901	?	—
1911	?	—

Year	Pop.	±%
1921	1,738	—
1931	1,798	+3.5%
1936	1,776	−1.2%
1951	2,092	+17.8%
1961	2,139	+2.2%

Year	Pop.	±%
1971	2,120	−0.9%
1981	1,964	−7.4%
1991	1,824	−7.1%
2001	1,843	+1.0%

Source: Data from ISTAT

== Climate ==
Climate data for Peio, elevation 1,565 m (5,135 ft), (1971–2000)
Month	Jan	Feb	Mar	Apr	May	Jun	Jul	Aug	Sep	Oct	Nov	Dec	Year
Mean daily maximum °C (°F)	4.9 (40.8)	5.3 (41.5)	7.6 (45.7)	9.6 (49.3)	14.0 (57.2)	17.5 (63.5)	20.6 (69.1)	20.5 (68.9)	17.0 (62.6)	12.1 (53.8)	7.2 (45.0)	5.2 (41.4)	11.8 (53.2)
Daily mean °C (°F)	−0.3 (31.5)	−0.1 (31.8)	2.1 (35.8)	4.5 (40.1)	9.0 (48.2)	12.3 (54.1)	15.2 (59.4)	15.2 (59.4)	11.8 (53.2)	7.5 (45.5)	2.6 (36.7)	0.4 (32.7)	6.7 (44.0)
Mean daily minimum °C (°F)	−5.5 (22.1)	−5.5 (22.1)	−3.3 (26.1)	−0.5 (31.1)	4.1 (39.4)	7.1 (44.8)	9.8 (49.6)	9.9 (49.8)	6.6 (43.9)	2.8 (37.0)	−2.1 (28.2)	−4.5 (23.9)	1.6 (34.8)
Average precipitation mm (inches)	47 (1.9)	39 (1.5)	59 (2.3)	82 (3.2)	106 (4.2)	95 (3.7)	88 (3.5)	87 (3.4)	71 (2.8)	96 (3.8)	72 (2.8)	50 (2.0)	892 (35.1)
Source: Istituto Superiore per la Protezione e la Ricerca Ambientale
