= San Vigilio, Pinzolo =

Church in Trentino-Alto Adige, Italy

Coordinates: 46°9′53″N 10°45′53″E

Church of Saint Vigilius of Trent (Chiesa di San Vigilio)
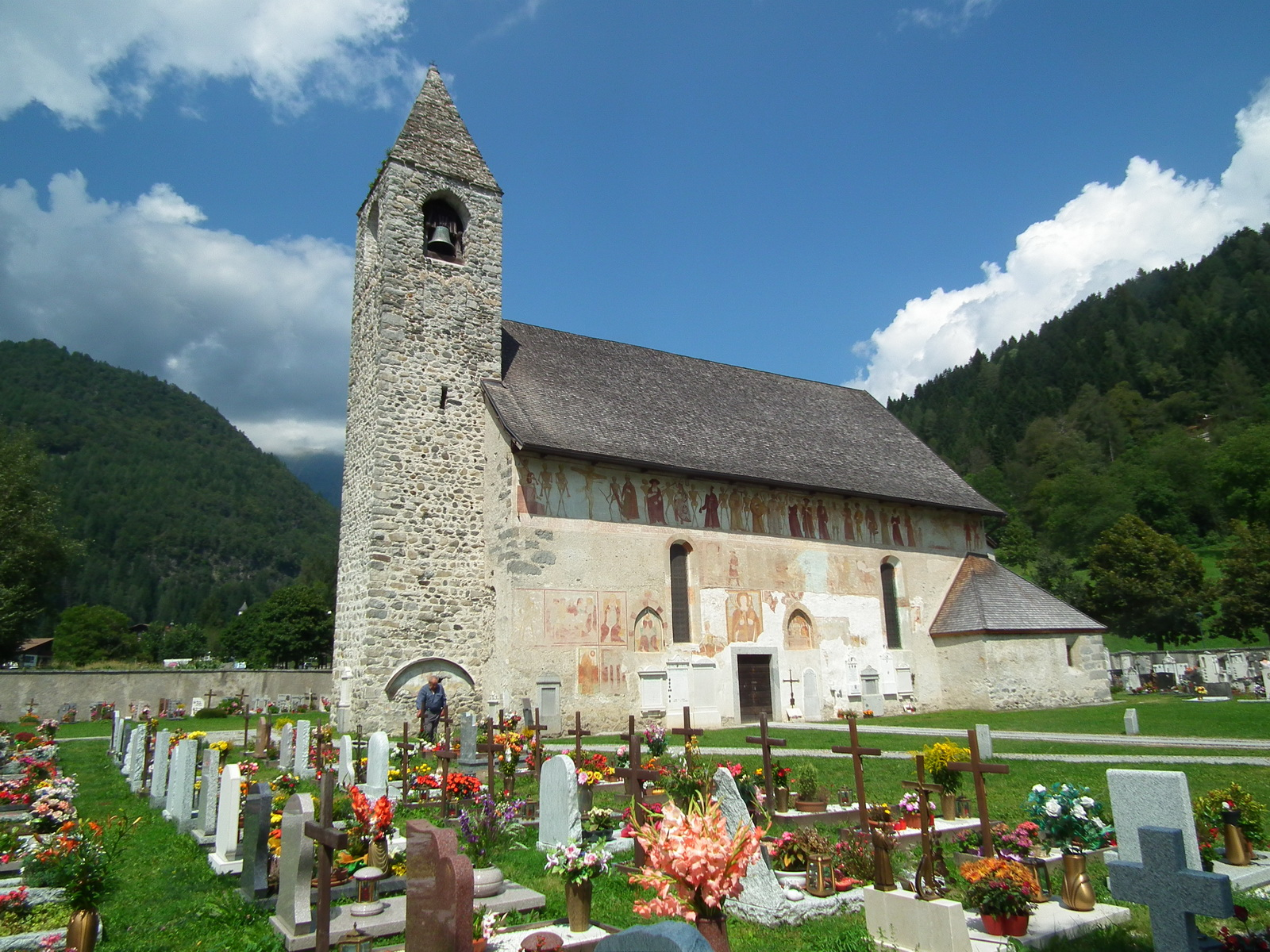
- Frescos on the outer wall of the church

Religion
- Affiliation: Roman Catholic
- Province: Trentino

Location
- Location: Pinzolo, Italy
- Interactive map of Church of Saint Vigilius of Trent (Chiesa di San Vigilio)

Architecture
- Type: Church
- Style: Romanesque

Church of Saint Vigilius of Trent (Italian: Chiesa di San Vigilio) is a Roman Catholic church in the town of Pinzolo, in the province of Trentino and the region of Trentino-Alto Adige/Südtirol, Italy.
