= Campo Carlo Magno =

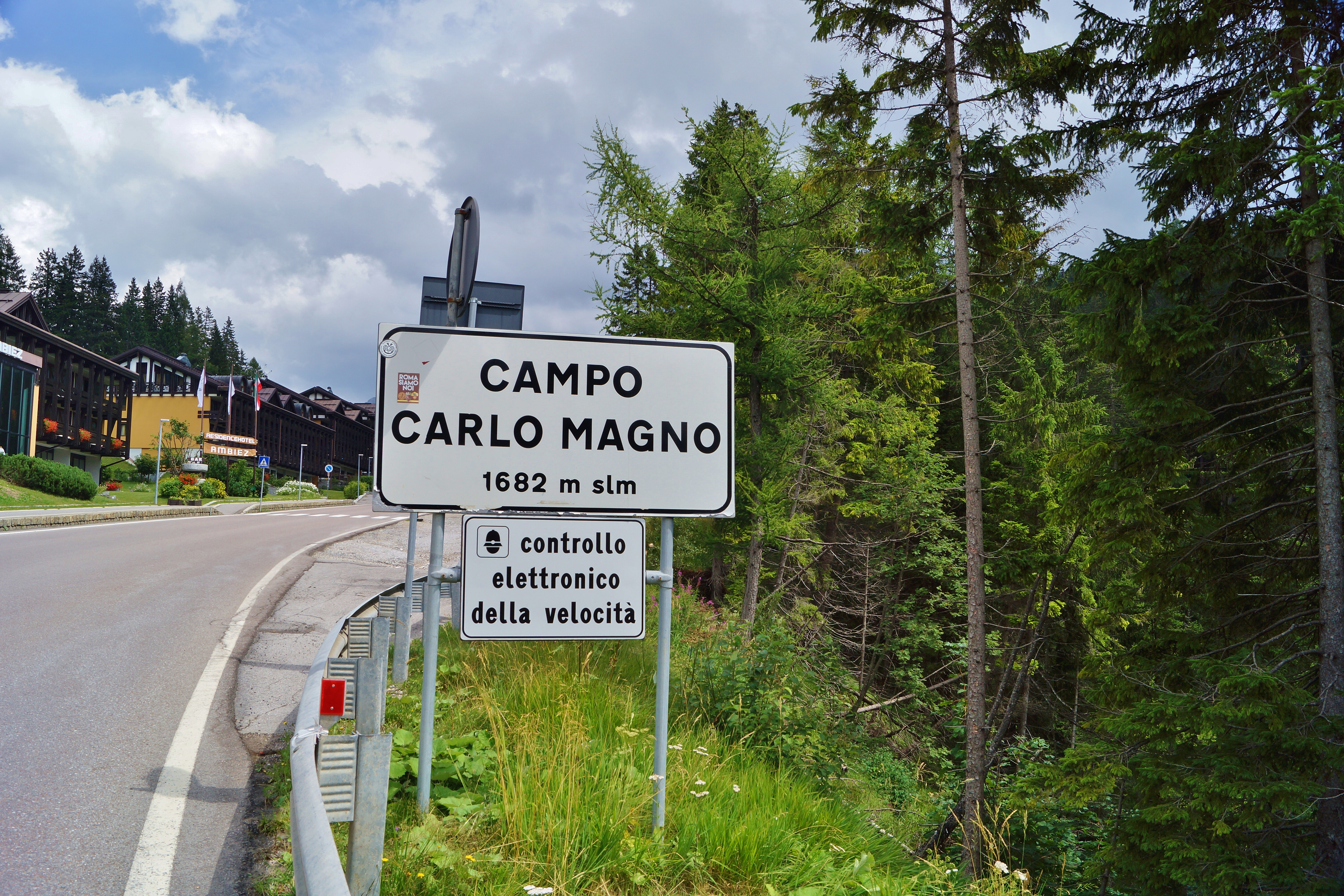

- Location within Alps
- Elevation: 1,682 metres (5,518 ft)

Third Approach
- Location: Trentino, Italy
- Range: Dolomites
- Coordinates: 46°14′35″N 10°50′24″E

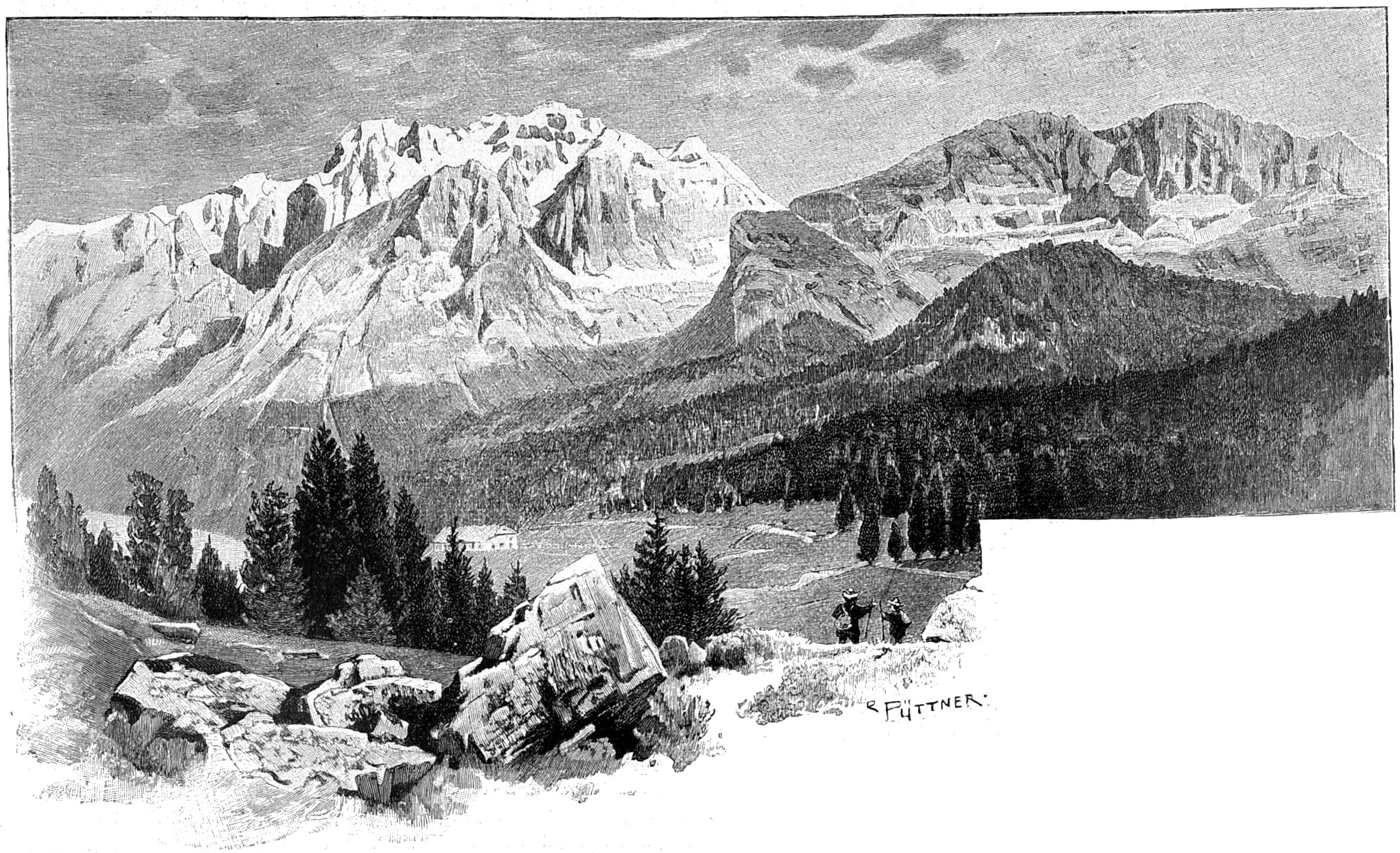

Campo Carlo Magno (elevation 1682 m) is a pass in the Adamello-Brenta mountain region in Italy. It connects the Val Rendena and the Val di Sole. To the west of the pass are the Adamello-Presanella mountains, to the east the Brenta Dolomites.

The pass is traditionally associated with a local legend claiming that Charlemagne crossed the area in 800 AD on his way to his imperial coronation in Rome. However, modern historians consider the expedition entirely mythical, tracing the lore back to 15th-century regional traditions and an official 1909 toponymic assignment.

It is a tourist location, as it has golf courses and the ski resort of Madonna di Campiglio.

== See also ==
- List of highest paved roads in Europe
- List of mountain passes
