= Sarca =

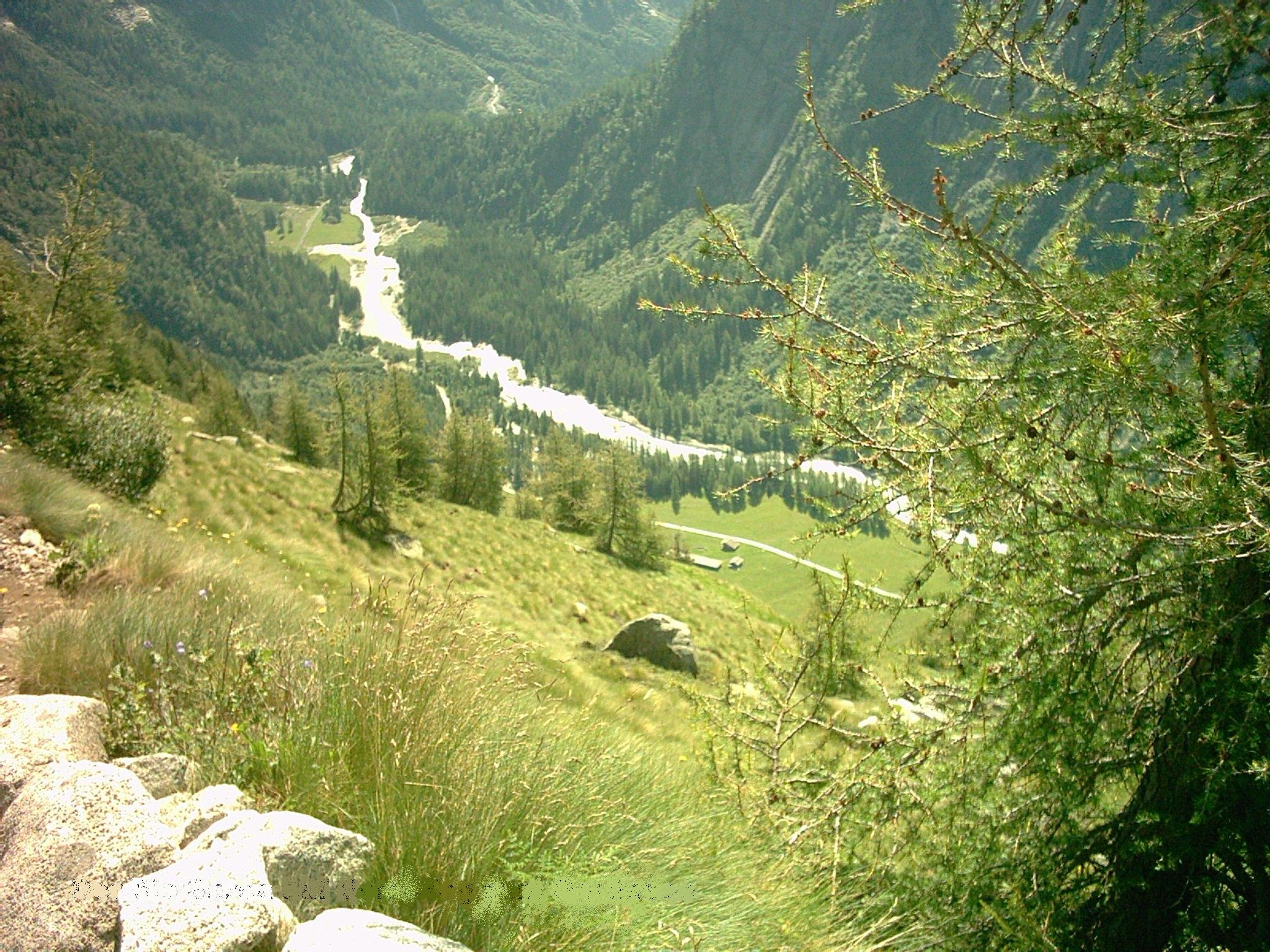
- The Sarca River in the Borzago valley (Val Borzago)

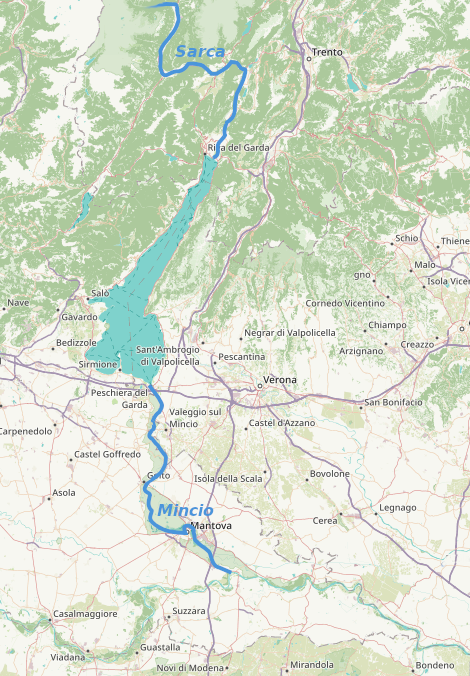
- The Sarca River (78 kilometres (48 mi)); Lake Garda (51.5 kilometres (32.0 mi)); The Mincio River (75 kilometres (47 mi))

Location
- Country: Italy

Physical characteristics
- Source
  - location: Alpine Adamello-Presanella mountains
- Mouth: Lake Garda
  - location: Nago-Torbole
  - coordinates: 45.8729°N 10.8657°E

Basin features
- Progression: Lake Garda→ Mincio→ Po→ Adriatic Sea

The Sarca is a river springing from the Adamello-Presanella mountains in the Italian Alps and flowing into Lake Garda, making the river its major source, at Torbole. As an emissary of the lake it becomes known as the Mincio river, forming a single river system 203 kilometres (126 mi) long (Sarca-Mincio).

With its 78 km (48 mi) length, it is the fifth largest river in Trentino after the Adige, Brenta 174 km (108 mi), Noce 105 km (65 mi) and Avisio 90 km (56 mi), while it is the second largest in terms of flow after the Adige.

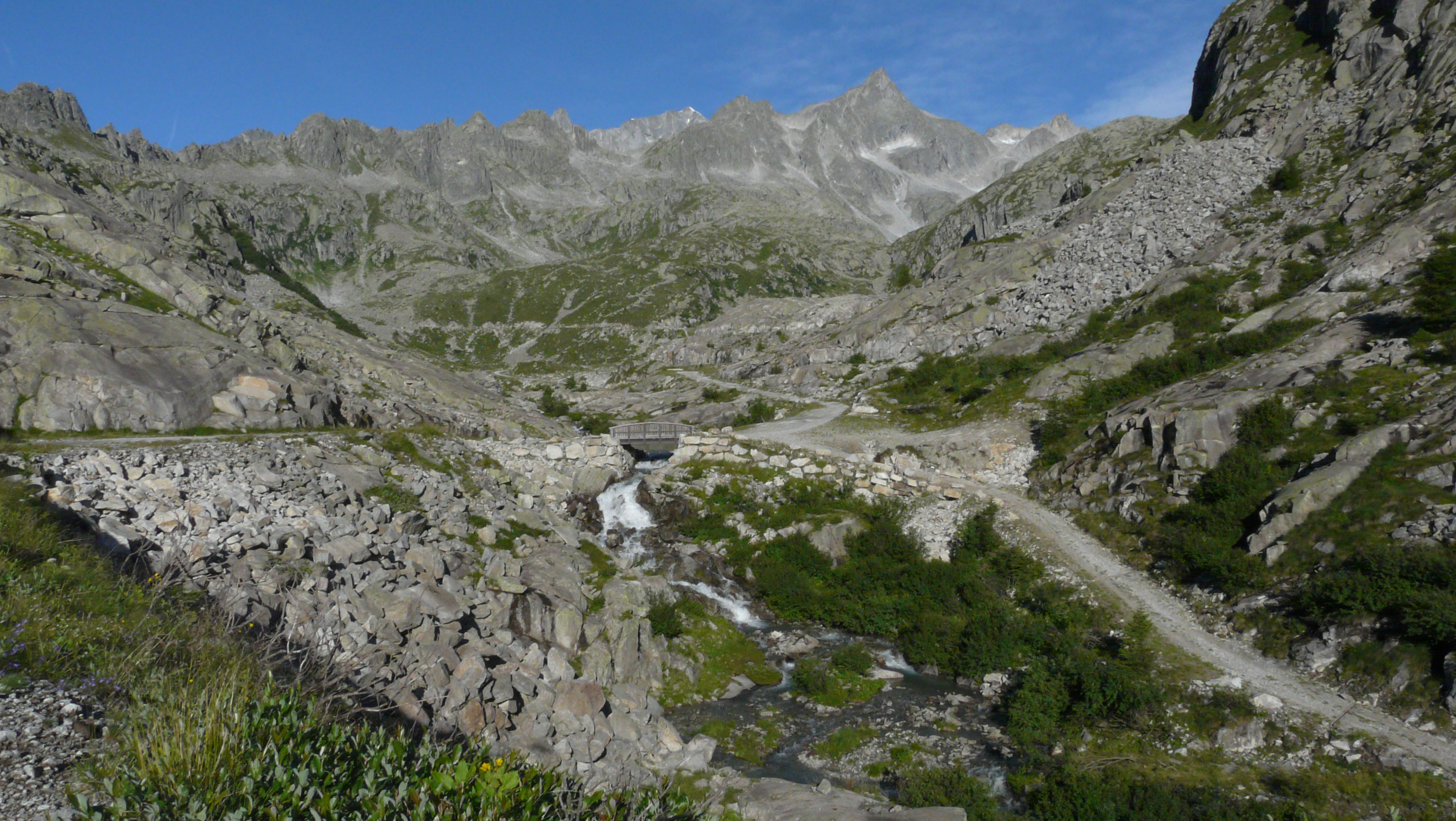
The source of the Sarca River, high in the Adamello-Presanella Alps

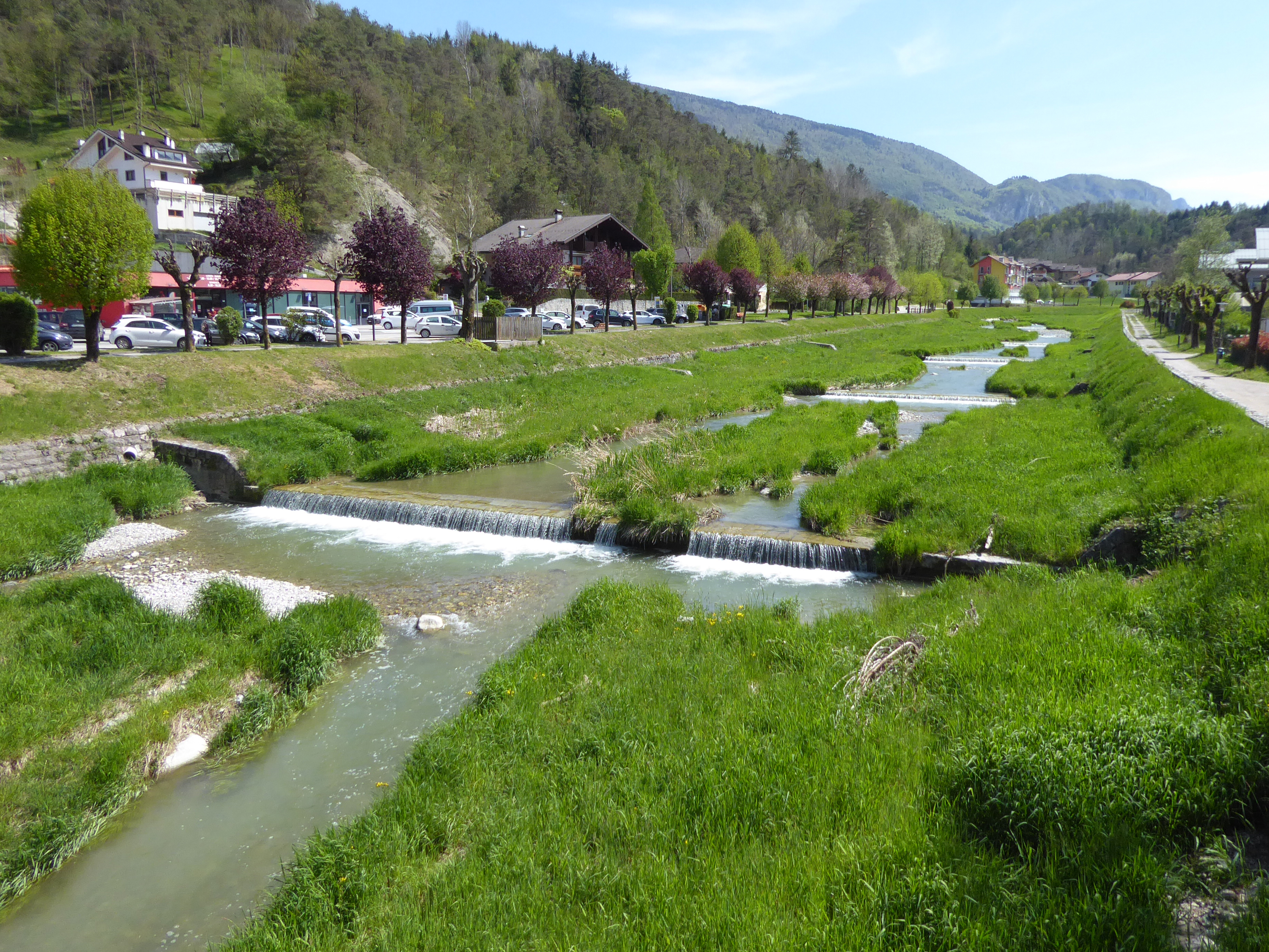
The Sarca river at Ponte Arche.

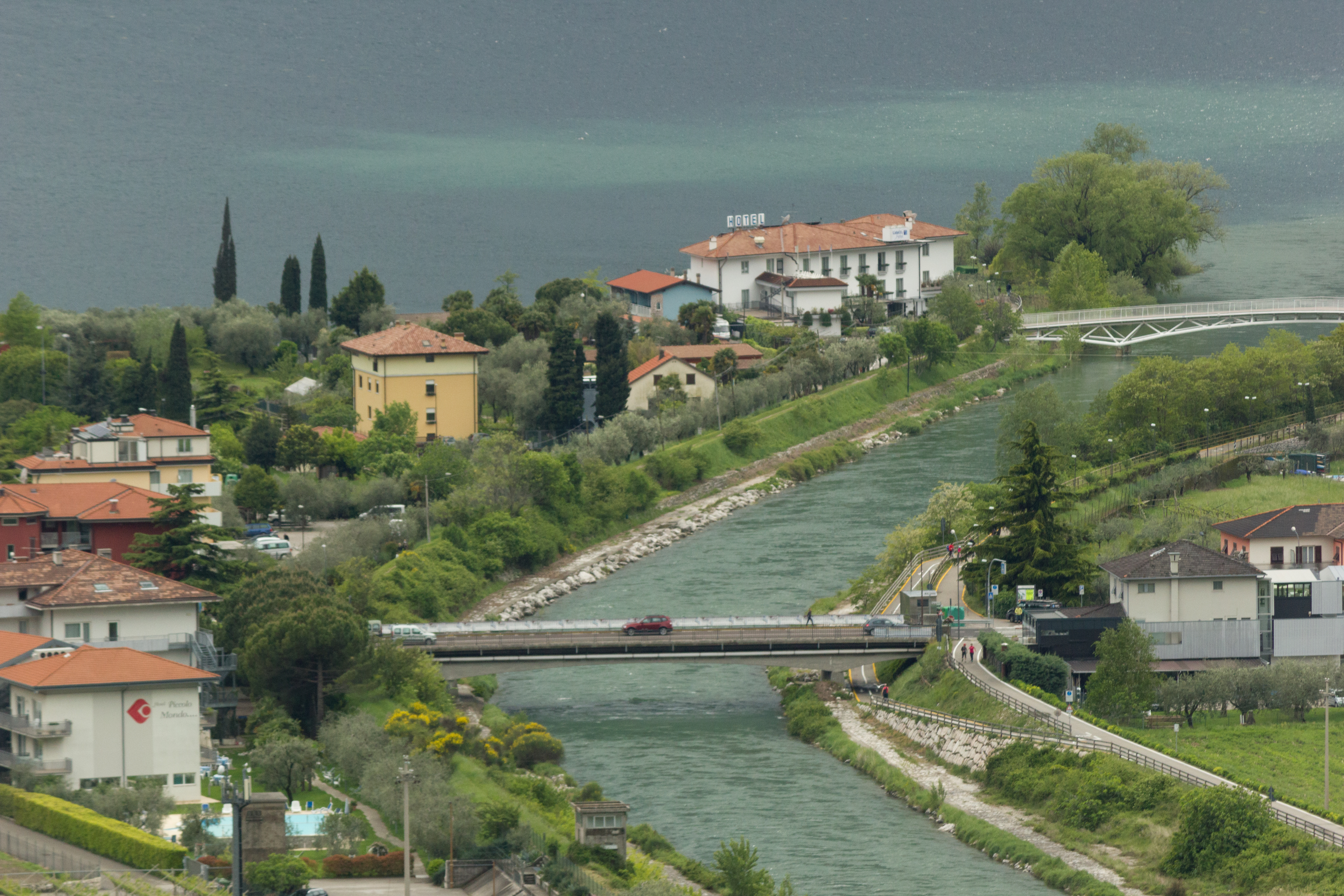
The mouth of the Sarca River, at Torbole

The river is shallow and fast flowing, passing through the Genova valley (Val di Genova), forming a number of waterfalls, of which Cascina Muta and Saft dei Can are the best known. Before reaching the Rendena Valley (Val Rendena), part of its water is diverted to a hydroelectric powerstation. Then its flow becomes less and less tumultuous. The main places on the river include Carisolo, Pinzolo, Tione di Trento, Le Sarche, Ponte Arche, Ragoli, Dro, Arco, and Torbole.
