= Spiazzo =

- Comune
- Comune di Spiazzo
- Location within Italy Location within Trentino-Alto Adige/Südtirol
- Coordinates: 46°6′N 10°44′E
- Country: Italy
- Region: Trentino-Alto Adige/Südtirol
- Province: Trentino (TN)

Government
  - Mayor: Sergio Lorenzi

Area
  - Total: 70.6 km^{2} (27.3 sq mi)

Population (Dec. 2004)
  - Total: 1,164
  - Density: 16.5/km^{2} (42.7/sq mi)
- Time zone: UTC+1 (CET)
  - Summer (DST): UTC+2 (CEST)
- Postal code: 38088
- Dialing code: 0465
- Website: Official website

Spiazzo is a comune (municipality) in Trentino in the northern Italian region Trentino-Alto Adige/Südtirol, located about 30 kilometres (19 mi) west of Trento. As of 31 December 2004, it had a population of 1,164 and an area of 70.6 square kilometres (27.3 mi^{2}).

Spiazzo borders the following municipalities: Ponte di Legno, Vermiglio, Giustino, Strembo, Saviore dell'Adamello, Caderzone, Massimeno, Daone, Bocenago, Pelugo and Montagne.

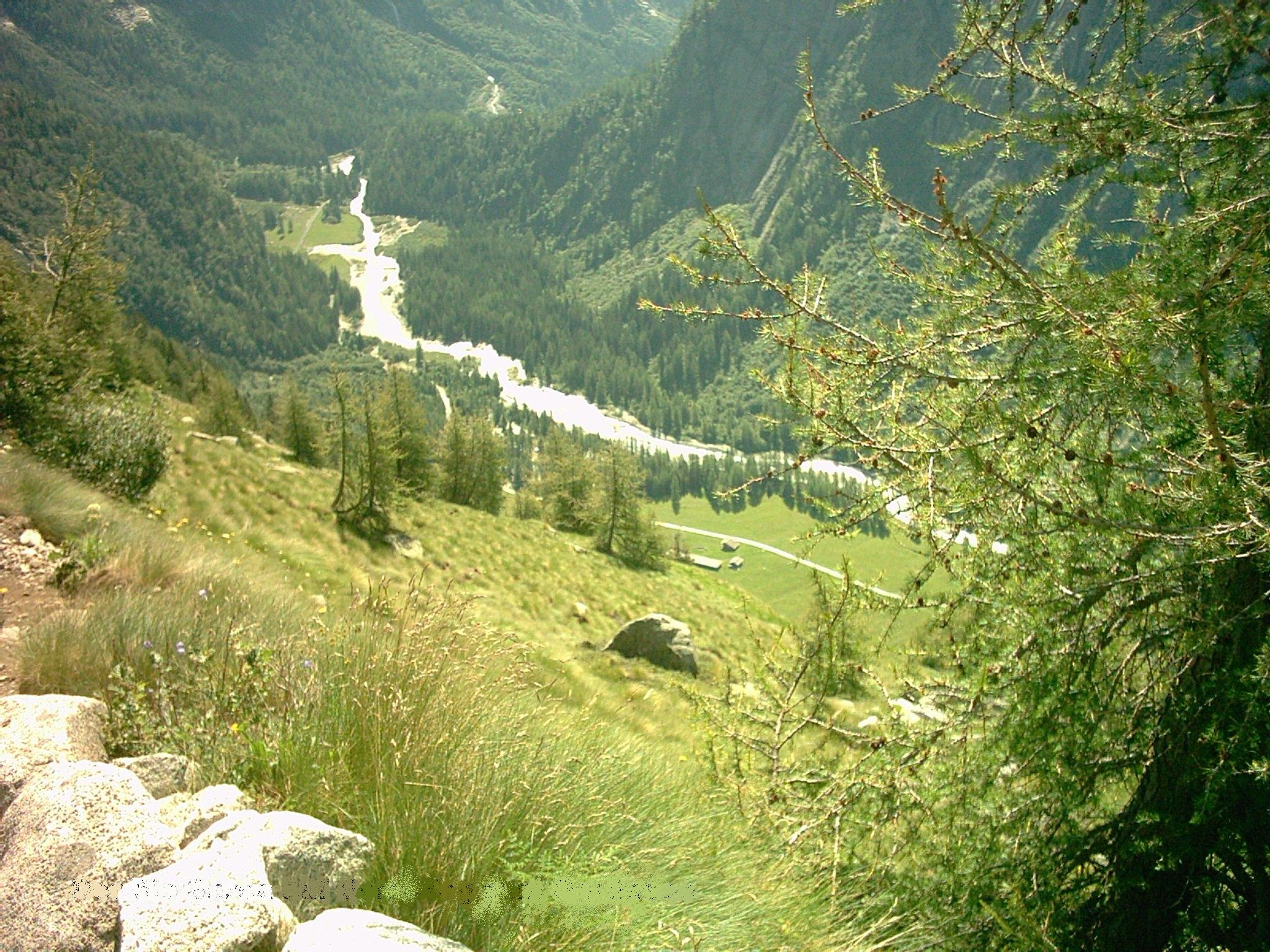
Borzago valley

== Demographic evolution ==
Historical population

Year	Pop.	±%
1861	?	—
1871	?	—
1881	?	—
1901	?	—
1911	?	—

Year	Pop.	±%
1921	2,031	—
1931	1,210	−40.4%
1936	1,030	−14.9%
1951	973	−5.5%
1961	919	−5.5%

Year	Pop.	±%
1971	1,022	+11.2%
1981	1,105	+8.1%
1991	1,112	+0.6%
2001	1,122	+0.9%

Source: Data from ISTAT
