= Val Rendena =

Valley in Trentino, Italy

Coordinates: 46.1149°N 10.7536°E

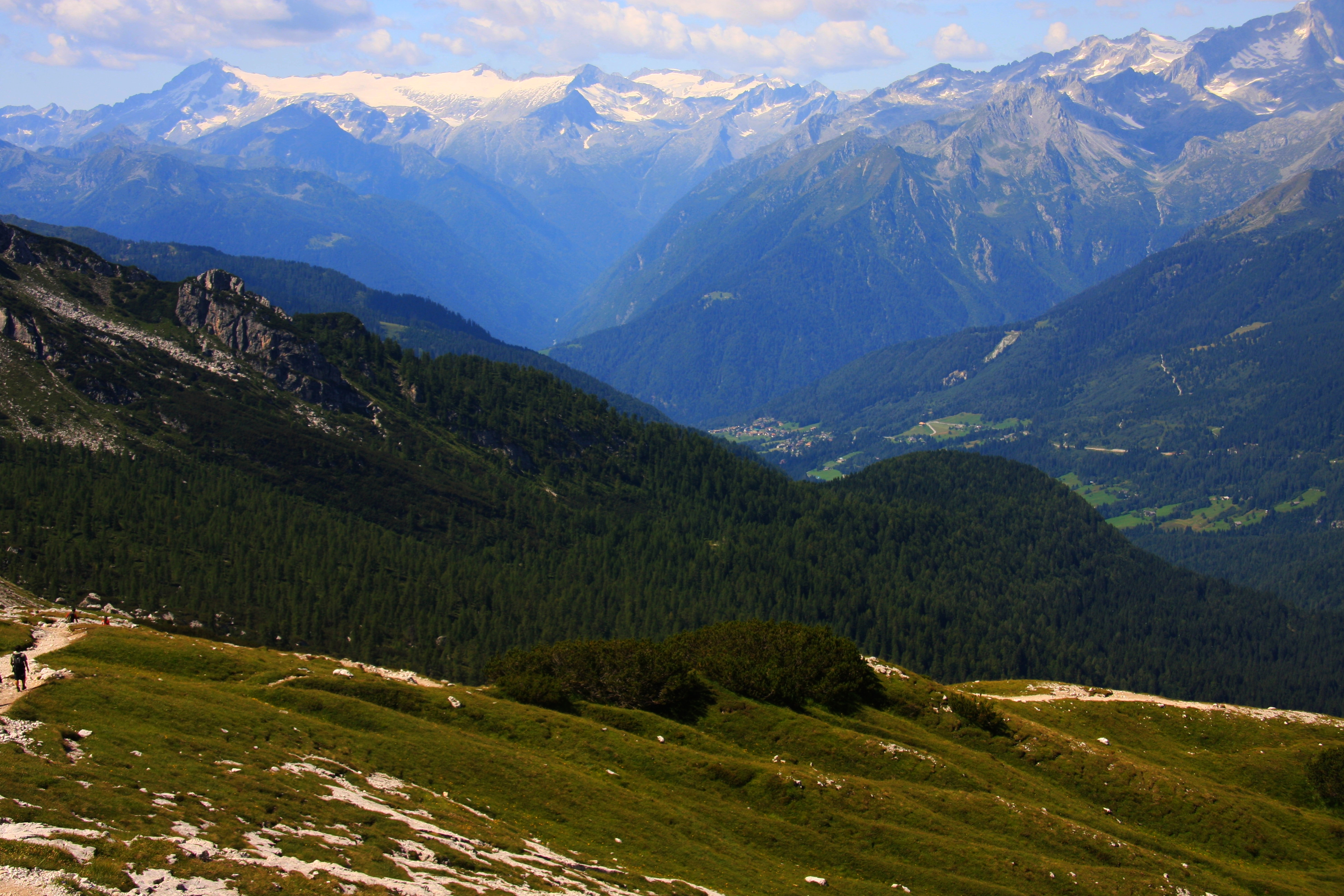
View off Val Rendena from Passo del Grosté; in the background Adamello-Presanella

Val Rendena (German: Randental) is the valley of the Sarca river in Trentino, northern Italy. The valley is part of the Giudicarie. Main towns include Spiazzo Rendena and Pinzolo.
