= Pinzolo =

Pinzolo Pinsöl (Lombard)
- Comune
- Comune di Pinzolo
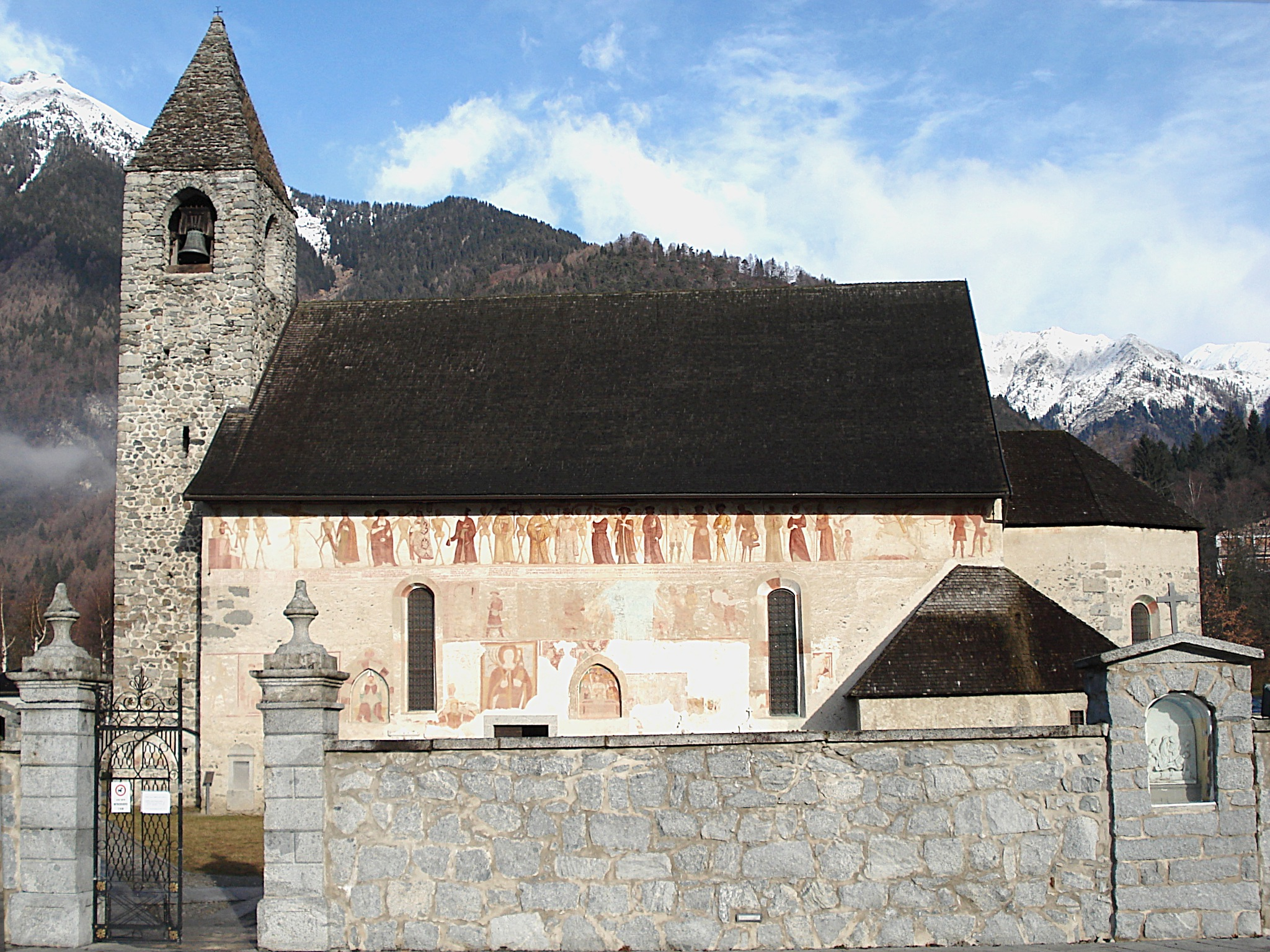
- Church of San Vigilio.

- Coat of arms

- Location within Italy Location within Trentino-Alto Adige/Südtirol
- Coordinates: 46°10′N 10°45′E
- Country: Italy
- Region: Trentino-Alto Adige/Südtirol
- Province: Trentino (TN)
- Frazioni: Madonna di Campiglio, S. Antonio di Mavignola

Government
  - Mayor: Michele Cereghini

Area
  - Total: 69.32 km^{2} (26.76 sq mi)
- Elevation: 800 m (2,600 ft)

Population (31 December 2015)
  - Total: 3,118
  - Density: 44.98/km^{2} (116.5/sq mi)
- Demonym: Pinzolesi
- Time zone: UTC+1 (CET)
  - Summer (DST): UTC+2 (CEST)
- Postal code: 38086
- Dialing code: 0465
- Patron saint: Saint Lawrence
- Saint day: August 10
- Website: Official website

Pinzolo (Eastern Lombard: Pinsöl) is a small town and comune situated in Val Rendena in Trentino in the northern Italian Alps at an elevation of 800 metres (2,600 ft). The Church of Saint Vigilius of Trent stands in the town.

It is mainly known as a ski resort during the winter months and as a popular tourist destination in the summer.

In January 2017 Valentino Rossi became Honorary Resident of the town.

== History ==
During the World War I, Pinzolo experienced considerable hardship. Due to its location on the Italian front line, grain stocks were requisitioned for the war effort and many men were conscripted into the Austro-Hungarian army to defend the Adamello front, fighting against the Italian forces. During the summer months the 6th company of the 2nd Regiment k.k landesschützen "Bozen' was stationed in the town. These events are documented in the novel "La penna del Corvo bianco"

During the Second World War, Pinzolo distinguished itself through acts of exceptional civilian courage. Between 1943 and 1945, despite German military occupation, the town sheltered and assisted hundreds of Allied prisoners of war who had escaped captivity, helping them to reach neutral Switzerland. The townspeople suffered deportations and severe reprisals as a consequence. In recognition of this conduct, Pinzolo was awarded the Medal for Civil Valor ("Medaglia d'argento al merito civile") in March 2006.

== See also ==
- Campo Carlo Magno
- Madonna di Campiglio
- Sarca
