= List of regional parks of Italy =

National and regional parks in Italy

The regional parks of Italy are protected natural areas consisting of terrestrial, river, lake areas and stretches of sea overlooking the coast, of environmental and naturalistic value, which represent, within one or more adjacent regions, a homogeneous system, identified by the naturalistic assets of the locations, with landscape and artistic values and cultural traditions of local populations.

They are officially regulated by Presidential Decree D.P.R. 616/77, which transferred the responsibility for their upkeep to the Italian regions. The fifth edition (2003) of Italy's Official List of Protected Natural Areas (EUAP) comprises 105 officially designated regional parks, covering a total land area of some 12,000 square kilometres. The list which follows also includes a number of parks not mentioned in the EUAP. The Parco naturale lombardo della Valle del Ticino was the first Italian regional park to be established and the first European river park.

== Northwest Italy ==
=== Valle d'Aosta ===
Name	Established	Area	Quick View
Parco naturale del Mont Avic	1989	5,747 ha (22.19 sq mi)	

=== Piedmont ===
Name	Established	Area	Quick View
Parco naturale Alta Valsesia	1979	7,000 ha (27 sq mi)	
Parco naturale Laghi di Avigliana	1980	409 ha (1.58 sq mi)	
Parco naturale dei Lagoni di Mercurago	1980	473 ha (1.83 sq mi)	
Parco naturale del Bosco delle Sorti della Partecipanza di Trino	1991	1,908 ha (7.37 sq mi)	
Parco naturale del Gran Bosco di Salbertrand	1980	3,775 ha (14.58 sq mi)	
Parco naturale del Monte Fenera	1987	3,378 ha (13.04 sq mi)	
Parco naturale del Sacro Monte di Crea	1980	47 ha (0.18 sq mi)	
Parco naturale della Alta Valle Pesio e Tanaro	1978	8,043 ha (31.05 sq mi)	
Parco naturale della Collina di Superga	1991	802 ha (3.10 sq mi)	
Parco naturale Val Troncea	1980	3,280 ha (12.7 sq mi)	
Parco naturale della Valle del Ticino	1978	6,561 ha (25.33 sq mi)	
Parco naturale delle Capanne di Marcarolo	1989	8,216 ha (31.72 sq mi)	
Parco naturale delle Lame di Sesia	1978	830 ha (3.2 sq mi)	
Parco naturale di Rocchetta Tanaro	1980	123 ha (0.47 sq mi)	
Parco naturale di Stupinigi	1992	1,611 ha (6.22 sq mi)	
Parco naturale Orsiera - Rocciavrè	1980	10,955 ha (42.30 sq mi)	
Parco naturale dell'Alpe Veglia e dell'Alpe Devero	1995	8,594 ha (33.18 sq mi)	
Parco naturale delle Alpi Marittime	1995	28,455 ha (109.87 sq mi)	
Parco naturale di interesse provinciale del Lago di Candia	1995	336 ha (1.30 sq mi)	
Parco regionale La Mandria	1978	6,571 ha (25.37 sq mi)	
Parco fluviale Gesso e Stura	2007	5,500 ha (21 sq mi)	
Parco naturale Alta Valle Antrona	2009	7,444 ha (28.74 sq mi)	
Parco naturale del Monviso	2016	10,112 ha (39.04 sq mi)	

=== Lombardy ===
Lombardy square	Name	Established	Area	Quick View
Parco regionale dell'Adamello		1983	50,935 ha (196.66 sq mi)	
Parco Alto Garda Bresciano		1989	38,269 ha (147.76 sq mi)	
Parco della Pineta di Appiano Gentile e Tradate		1983	4,860 ha (18.8 sq mi)	
Parco del Bosco delle Querce		2005	43 ha (0.17 sq mi)	
Parco del Campo dei Fiori		1984	6,300 ha (24 sq mi)	
Parco dei Colli di Bergamo		1977	4,700 ha (18 sq mi)	
Parco naturale del Monte Barro		1983	661 ha (2.55 sq mi)	
Parco regionale di Montevecchia e della Valle di Curone		1983	2,355 ha (9.09 sq mi)	
Parco Nord Milano		1975	790 ha (3.1 sq mi)	
Parco Spina Verde di Como		1993	1,179 ha (4.55 sq mi)	
Parco regionale della Valle del Lambro		1983	6,452 ha (24.91 sq mi)	
Parco naturale lombardo della Valle del Ticino		1974	91,800 ha (354 sq mi)	
Parco dell'Adda Nord		1983	8,979 ha (34.67 sq mi)	
Parco dell'Adda Sud		1983	24,260 ha (93.7 sq mi)	
Parco della Grigna Settentrionale		1977	5,541 ha (21.39 sq mi)	
Parco delle Groane		1976	7,770 ha (30.0 sq mi)	
Parco Agricolo Sud Milano		1990	47,044 ha (181.64 sq mi)	
Parco regionale del Mincio		1984	15,942 ha (61.55 sq mi)	
Parco del Monte Netto		2007	1,471 ha (5.68 sq mi)	
Parco dell'Oglio Nord		1988	14,170 ha (54.7 sq mi)	
Parco dell'Oglio Sud		1988	12,800 ha (49 sq mi)	
Parco delle Orobie Bergamasche		1989	70,000 ha (270 sq mi)	
Parco delle Orobie Valtellinesi		1989	44,000 ha (170 sq mi)	
Parco del Serio		1973	7,750 ha (29.9 sq mi)	

=== Liguria ===
Name	Established	Area	Quick View
Parco naturale regionale delle Alpi Liguri	2007	6,041 ha (23.32 sq mi)	
Parco naturale regionale dell'Antola	1995	4,842 ha (18.70 sq mi)	
Parco naturale regionale dell'Aveto	1995	3,019 ha (11.66 sq mi)	
Parco naturale regionale del Beigua	1985	8,723 ha (33.68 sq mi)	
Parco naturale regionale di Bric Tana	1985	170 ha (0.66 sq mi)	
Parco naturale regionale di Portovenere	2001	131 ha (0.51 sq mi)	
Parco naturale regionale di Montemarcello - Magra	1995	4,320 ha (16.7 sq mi)	
Parco naturale regionale di Piana Crixia	1989	795 ha (3.07 sq mi)	
Parco naturale regionale di Portofino	1935	1,056 ha (4.08 sq mi)	

== Northeast Italy ==
=== Trentino-Alto Adige/Südtirol ===
Name	Established	Area	Quick View
Parco naturale provinciale dell'Adamello-Brenta	1988	62,052 ha (239.58 sq mi)	
Parco naturale Paneveggio - Pale di San Martino	1967	19,100 ha (74 sq mi)	
Naturpark Fanes-Sennes-Prags	1980	25,680 ha (99.2 sq mi)	
Naturpark Puez-Geisler	1977	10,196 ha (39.37 sq mi)	
Naturpark Rieserferner-Ahrn	1988	31,505 ha (121.64 sq mi)	
Naturpark Schlern-Rosengarten	1974	6,796 ha (26.24 sq mi)	
Naturpark Sextener Dolomiten	1981	11,891 ha (45.91 sq mi)	
Naturpark Texelgruppe	1976	33,430 ha (129.1 sq mi)	
Naturpark Trudner Horn	1988	6,866 ha (26.51 sq mi)	

=== Veneto ===
Name	Established	Area	Quick View
Parco regionale dei Colli Euganei	1989	18,694 ha (72.18 sq mi)	
Parco regionale del Delta del Po (VE)	1997	12,592 ha (48.62 sq mi)	
Parco rurale sovracomunale Civiltà delle Rogge	1984	250 ha (0.97 sq mi)	
Parco naturale regionale delle Dolomiti d'Ampezzo	1990	11,320 ha (43.7 sq mi)	
Parco naturale regionale del Fiume Sile	1991	4,159 ha (16.06 sq mi)	
Parco naturale regionale della Lessinia	1984	10,201 ha (39.39 sq mi)	

=== Friuli-Venezia Giulia ===
Name	Established	Area	Quick View
Parco naturale delle Dolomiti Friulane	1996	36,950 ha (142.7 sq mi)	
Parco naturale delle Prealpi Giulie	1996	9,402 ha (36.30 sq mi)	

=== Emilia-Romagna ===
Name	Established	Area	Quick View
Parco fluviale regionale del Taro	1988	3,123 ha (12.06 sq mi)	
Parco regionale dello Stirone e del Piacenziano	2011	2,190 ha (8.5 sq mi)	
Parco naturale regionale dei Boschi di Carrega	1982	1,270 ha (4.9 sq mi)	
Parco regionale dei Gessi Bolognesi e Calanchi dell'Abbadessa	1988	4,816 ha (18.59 sq mi)	
Parco regionale dei Sassi di Roccamalatina	1988	2,300 ha (8.9 sq mi)	
Parco regionale del Corno alle Scale	1988	4,974 ha (19.20 sq mi)	
Parco regionale Delta del Po (ER)	1988	53,653 ha (207.16 sq mi)	
Parco regionale dell'Alto Appennino Modenese	1988	15,363 ha (59.32 sq mi)	
Parco regionale delle Valli del Cedra e del Parma	1995	1,485 ha (5.73 sq mi)	
Parco regionale dell'Abbazia di Monteveglio	1988	878 ha (3.39 sq mi)	
Parco regionale dei Laghi Suviana e Brasimone	1995	3,330 ha (12.9 sq mi)	
Parco regionale storico di Monte Sole	1989	6,300 ha (24 sq mi)	
Parco regionale Vena del Gesso Romagnola	2005	2,042 ha (7.88 sq mi)	
Parco regionale fluviale del Trebbia	2009	4,031 ha (15.56 sq mi)	

== Central Italy ==
=== Tuscany ===
Name	Established	Area	Quick View
Parco naturale della Maremma	1975	9,000 ha (35 sq mi)	
Parco naturale di Migliarino, San Rossore, Massaciuccoli	1979	23,115 ha (89.25 sq mi)	
Parco naturale regionale delle Alpi Apuane	1985	20,598 ha (79.53 sq mi)	
Parco interprovinciale dei Montioni	1998	6,399 ha (24.71 sq mi)	
Parco provinciale dei Monti Livornesi	1999	1,329 ha (5.13 sq mi)	

=== Marche ===
Name	Established	Area	Quick View
Parco naturale regionale del Monte San Bartolo	1994	1,596 ha (6.16 sq mi)	
Parco naturale regionale del Sasso Simone e Simoncello	1994	4,791 ha (18.50 sq mi)	
Parco naturale regionale della Gola della Rossa e di Frasassi	1997	10,026 ha (38.71 sq mi)	
Parco regionale del Conero	1987	6,011 ha (23.21 sq mi)	

=== Umbria ===
Name	Established	Area	Quick View
Parco del Monte Cucco	1995	10,480 ha (40.5 sq mi)	
Parco del Monte Subasio	1995	7,177 ha (27.71 sq mi)	
Parco del Lago Trasimeno	1995	13,200 ha (51 sq mi)	
Parco del Colfiorito	1995	338 ha (1.31 sq mi)	
Parco fluviale del Nera	1995	2,460 ha (9.5 sq mi)	
Parco fluviale del Tevere	1995	7,295 ha (28.17 sq mi)	

=== Lazio ===
Name	Established	Area	Quick View
Parco dell'Inviolata	1996	535 ha (2.07 sq mi)	
Parco naturale regionale dell'Appennino - Monti Simbruini	1983	29,990 ha (115.8 sq mi)	
Parco regionale dei Castelli Romani	1984	15,000 ha (58 sq mi)	
Parco regionale naturale dei Monti Lucretili	1989	18,204 ha (70.29 sq mi)	
Parco naturale regionale Appia Antica	1988	3,370 ha (13.0 sq mi)	
Parco naturale di Veio	1997	14,985 ha (57.86 sq mi)	
Parco naturale dei Monti Aurunci	1997	19,374 ha (74.80 sq mi)	
Parco naturale regionale del complesso lacuale di Bracciano - Martignano	1999	16,682 ha (64.41 sq mi)	
Parco regionale Marturanum	1984	1,240 ha (4.8 sq mi)	
Parco regionale di Gianola e del Monte di Scauri	1987	17 ha (0.066 sq mi)	
Parco urbano dell'antichissima Città di Sutri	1988	7 ha (0.027 sq mi)	
Parco regionale Valle del Treja	1982	656 ha (2.53 sq mi)	
Parco regionale urbano Monte Orlando	1986	58 ha (0.22 sq mi)	
Parco Regionale Monti Ausoni e Lago di Fondi	2008	8,770 ha (33.9 sq mi)	

== Southern Italy ==
=== Abruzzo ===
Name	Established	Area	Quick View
Sirente-Velino Regional Park	1989	47,497 ha (183.39 sq mi)	

=== Molise ===
Name	Established	Area	Quick View
Parco regionale agricolo storico dell'olivo di Venafro	2004	530 ha (2.0 sq mi)	

=== Campania ===
Name	Established	Area	Quick View
Parco naturale Diecimare	1980	220 ha (0.85 sq mi)	
Parco regionale Monti Picentini	1993	62,200 ha (240 sq mi)	
Parco regionale del Partenio	1993	14,870 ha (57.4 sq mi)	
Parco regionale del Matese	2002	33,327 ha (128.68 sq mi)	
Parco regionale di Roccamonfina - Foce Garigliano	1993	11,000 ha (42 sq mi)	
Parco regionale del Taburno - Camposauro	1993	12,370 ha (47.8 sq mi)	
Parco regionale dei Campi Flegrei	2002	7,350 ha (28.4 sq mi)	
Parco regionale Bacino Idrografico del fiume Sarno	2003	3,436 ha (13.27 sq mi)	
Parco regionale dei Monti Lattari	2003	16,000 ha (62 sq mi)	

=== Apulia ===
Name	Established	Area	Quick View
Parco naturale in località Lama Balice	1992	502 ha (1.94 sq mi)	
Parco naturale regionale Bosco e paludi di Rauccio	2002	1,593 ha (6.15 sq mi)	
Parco Naturale Regionale Dune costiere da Torre Canne a Torre San Leonardo	2002	1,069 ha (4.13 sq mi)	
Parco di Porto Selvaggio e Palude del Capitano	2006	1,120 ha (4.3 sq mi)	
Parco naturale regionale Salina di Punta della Contessa	2002	1,697 ha (6.55 sq mi)	
Parco Naturale Regionale Bosco Incoronata	2006	1,060 ha (4.1 sq mi)	
Parco Naturale Regionale Terra delle Gravine	2005	19,775 ha (76.35 sq mi)	
Parco Naturale Regionale Isola di S. Andrea e litorale di Punta Pizzo	2006	685 ha (2.64 sq mi)	
Parco Naturale Regionale Costa Otranto - Santa Maria di Leuca e Bosco di Tricase	2006	3,227 ha (12.46 sq mi)	
Parco naturale regionale Litorale di Ugento	2007	1,600 ha (6.2 sq mi)	
Parco naturale regionale Fiume Ofanto	2007	24,883 ha (96.07 sq mi)	

=== Basilicata ===
Name	Established	Area	Quick View
Parco della Murgia Materana	1990	6,128 ha (23.66 sq mi)	
Parco naturale di Gallipoli Cognato - Piccole Dolomiti Lucane	1997	27,027 ha (104.35 sq mi)	
Parco naturale regionale del Vulture	2016	6,518 ha (25.17 sq mi)	

=== Calabria ===
Name	Established	Area	Quick View
Parco naturale regionale delle Serre	1990	17,687 ha (68.29 sq mi)	

== Insular Italy ==
=== Sicily ===
Name	Established	Area	Quick View
Parco dell'Etna	1987	58,095 ha (224.31 sq mi)	
Parco delle Madonie	1989	39,941 ha (154.21 sq mi)	
Parco dei Nebrodi	1993	88,887 ha (343.19 sq mi)	
Parco fluviale dell'Alcantara	2001	1,927 ha (7.44 sq mi)	

=== Sardinia ===
Name	Established	Area	Quick View
Parco naturale regionale di Porto Conte	1999	5,350 ha (20.7 sq mi)	
Parco naturale regionale Molentargius-Saline	1999	1,622 ha (6.26 sq mi)	
Parco naturale regionale di Tepilora, Sant'Anna e Rio Posada	2014	7,878 ha (30.42 sq mi)	

== See also ==
- Conservation in Italy
- List of national parks of Italy
- List of Marine Protected Areas of Italy
