= List of national parks of Italy =

National and regional parks in Italy

The national parks of Italy are protected natural areas categorized as terrestrial, marine, fluvial or lacustrine, which contain one or more intact ecosystems (or only partially altered by anthropic interventions) and/or one or more physical, geological, geomorphological, biological formations of national and international interest, for naturalistic, scientific, cultural, aesthetic, educational, or recreational values, such as to justify the intervention of the State for their conservation.

There are 26 Italian national parks registered on the Official List of Protected Natural Areas (EUAP) that altogether cover an area of over 16,000 km^{2} (6,200 sq mi), which corresponds to approximately 5.3% of Italian national territory. The parks are managed by the Ministry of the Environment based in Rome (Italian: Ministero dell'Ambiente).

== List of Italian national parks ==
=== Parks established before World War II ===
Name	Regions	Area	High Point	Elevation	Established	Map	Quick View
Abruzzo, Lazio and Molise	Abruzzo, Lazio, Molise	506.83 km^{2} (195.69 sq mi)	Monte Petroso	2,249 m (7,379 ft)	1923		
Circeo	Lazio	84.40 km^{2} (32.59 sq mi)	Monte Circeo	541 m (1,775 ft)	1934		
Gran Paradiso	Valle d'Aosta, Piedmont	700.00 km^{2} (270.27 sq mi)	Gran Paradiso	4,061 m (13,323 ft)	1922		
Stelvio	Lombardy, Trentino-Alto Adige/Südtirol	1,307.00 km^{2} (504.64 sq mi)	Cima Ortles	3,905 m (12,812 ft)	1935		

=== Parks established from the post-war period up to the 1980s ===
Name	Regions	Area	High Point	Elevation	Established	Map	Quick View
Aspromonte	Calabria	760.53 km^{2} (293.64 sq mi)	Montalto	1,955 m (6,414 ft)	1989		
Dolomiti Bellunesi	Veneto	31.51 km^{2} (12.17 sq mi)	Monte Pavione	2,335 m (7,661 ft)	1988		
Foreste Casentinesi, Monte Falterona, and Campigna	Emilia-Romagna, Tuscany	364.00 km^{2} (140.54 sq mi)	Monte Falterona	1,645 m (5,397 ft)	1989		
Pollino	Basilicata, Calabria	1,925.65 km^{2} (743.50 sq mi)	Sierra Dolcedorme	2,267 m (7,438 ft)	1988		

=== Parks established in the 1990s ===
Name	Regions	Area	High Point	Elevation	Established	Map	Quick View
Archipelago of La Maddalena	Sardinia	201.46 km^{2} (77.78 sq mi)	Punta Tejalone, Caprera	212 m (696 ft)	1994		
Asinara	Sardinia	269.60 km^{2} (104.09 sq mi)	Punta Scomunica	408 m (1,339 ft)	1997		
Cilento, Vallo di Diano, and Alburni	Campania	1,810.48 km^{2} (699.03 sq mi)	Monte Cervati	1,898 m (6,227 ft)	1991		
Cinque Terre	Liguria	38.60 km^{2} (14.90 sq mi)	Monte (Mai-)Pertuso	820 m (2,690 ft)	1999		
Gargano	Apulia	1,211.18 km^{2} (467.64 sq mi)	Monte Calvo	1,065 m (3,494 ft)	1991		
Gennargentu	Sardinia	730.00 km^{2} (281.85 sq mi)	Punta La Marmora	1,834 m (6,017 ft)	1998		
Gran Sasso and Monti della Laga	Marche, Abruzzo, Lazio	1,413.31 km^{2} (545.68 sq mi)	Corno Grande	2,912 m (9,554 ft)	1991		
Majella	Abruzzo	704.00 km^{2} (271.82 sq mi)	Monte Amaro	2,793 m (9,163 ft)	1991		
Sibillini Mountains	Marche, Umbria	697.22 km^{2} (269.20 sq mi)	Monte Vettore	2,476 m (8,123 ft)	1988		
Tuscan Archipelago	Tuscany	746.53 km^{2} (288.24 sq mi)	Monte Capanne on Elba in the Tuscan Archipelago	1,018 m (3,340 ft)	1989		
Val Grande	Piedmont	145.98 km^{2} (56.36 sq mi)	Monte Togano	2,295 m (7,530 ft)	1991		
Vesuvius	Campania	72.59 km^{2} (28.03 sq mi)	Great Cone	1,281 m (4,203 ft)	1991		

=== Parks established in the 2000s ===
Name	Regions	Area	High Point	Elevation	Established	Map	Quick View
Alta Murgia	Apulia	677.39 km^{2} (261.54 sq mi)	Torre Disperata	686 m (2,251 ft)	2004		
Appennino Lucano - Val d'Agri - Lagonegrese	Basilicata	689.96 km^{2} (266.40 sq mi)	Monte del Papa	2,005 m (6,578 ft)	2007		
Appennino Tosco-Emiliano	Emilia-Romagna, Tuscany	227.92 km^{2} (88.00 sq mi)	Monte Cusna	2,121 m (6,959 ft)	1997		
Sila	Calabria	736.95 km^{2} (284.54 sq mi)	Monte Botte Donato	1,928 m (6,325 ft)	1997		

=== Parks established in 2010s ===
Name	Regions	Area	High Point	Elevation	Established	Map	Quick View
Island of Pantelleria	Sicily	66.4 km^{2} (25.6 sq mi)	Montagna Grande	836 m (2,743 ft)	2016		
Matese	Campania, Molise	878,98 km^{2} (339,37 sq mi)	Monte Miletto	2,050 m (6725,722 ft)	2025		

== See also ==
- Conservation in Italy
- List of regional parks of Italy
- List of Marine Protected Areas of Italy

== Bibliography ==
- Black, Charles Bertram (1898). The Riviera, Or The Coast from Marseilles to Leghorn: Including the Interior towns of Carrara, Lucca, Pisa, and Pistoia. London: Adam & Charles Black.
- Hydrographic Office, Admiralty (1913). The Mediterranean Pilot. Vol. I (5th ed.). London: Taylor, Garnett, Evans & Co.
