= Rosà =

- Comune
- Comune di Rosà
- Location within Italy Location within Veneto
- Coordinates: 45°43′N 11°46′E
- Country: Italy
- Region: Veneto
- Province: Vicenza (VI)
- Frazioni: Cusinati, San Pietro, Sant'Anna, Travettore

Government
  - Mayor: Paolo Bordignon (Lega Nord)

Area
  - Total: 24 km^{2} (9.3 sq mi)
- Elevation: 97 m (318 ft)

Population (31.12.2012)
  - Total: 14,328
  - Density: 600/km^{2} (1,500/sq mi)
- Demonym: Rosatesi
- Time zone: UTC+1 (CET)
  - Summer (DST): UTC+2 (CEST)
- Postal code: 36027
- Dialing code: 0424
- ISTAT code: 024087
- Patron saint: Sant'Antonio Abate
- Saint day: 17 January
- Website: Official website

Rosà (Venetian: Rozà) is a town of 14,328 inhabitants in the province of Vicenza, Veneto, Italy. The name comes from the Latin word "roxata", the ancient name of the biggest irrigation channel that passed in that area. The municipality incorporates 4 hamlets (Travettore, Sant'Anna, San Pietro, Cusinati). Rosà is officially European Town of Sport 2011.

== History ==
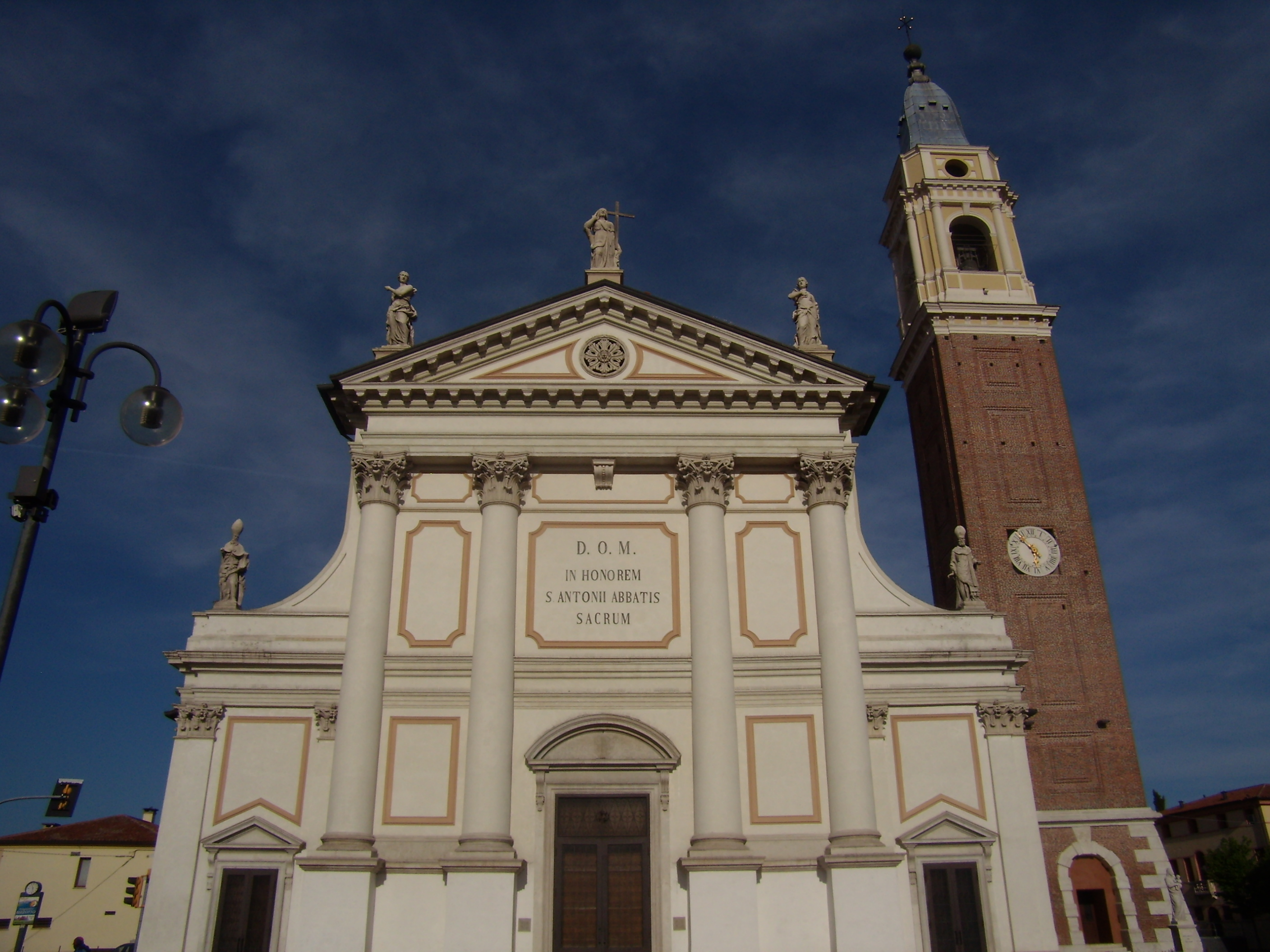
The Cathedral of Rosà

In the hamlet of San Pietro some Roman ashes have been found so we can suppose that there was a Roman village in this area. During the Migration Period the region was invaded by Quadi, Marcomanni, Sarmatians, Alemanni, Visigoths, Svevi, Alani, Unni, Lombards, Franks and Hungarians. The town of Rosà was officially born in 1533 during the rule of the Republic of Venice. After the Napoleonic invasion the whole region was sold to Austria-Hungary (with the neighboring Lombardy to form the Kingdom of Lombardy–Venetia) within which remained until 1866 when with the Third Italian War of Independence it became part of Italy. Rosà was very close to the front during the First World War. After the Second World War Rosà became part of the Italian Republic.

== Administrative subdivisions ==
The municipal statute of Rosà, recognizes Sant'Anna, Travettore, Cusinati and San Pietro as frazioni. Such as Siena, Rosà is further historically divided into quartieri.

=== Frazioni ===
- Travettore
- Sant'Anna
- Cusinati
- San Pietro

=== Quartieri ===
Rosà is actually divided into 11 quartieri, with a president and social colors.
Every year these quartieri challenge in 2 tournament of amateur football and the Palio delle Rose.
These are the quartieri:

- Borgo Tocchi
- Ca' Dolfin
- Ca' Minotto
- Carpellina
- Cremona
- Lunardon
- Nuovo
- Oratorio
- Sant'Antonio
- Seminarietto
- Tigli-Matteotti

== Government ==
Took office	Left office	Mayor	Political party	Note
21 November 1993	16 November 1997	Giovanni Didonè	Lega Nord	
17 November 1997	26 May 2002	Giovanni Didonè	Lega Nord	
26 May 2002	27 May 2007	Manuela Lanzarin	Lega Nord	
27 May 2007	7 May 2012	Manuela Lanzarin	Lega Nord	
7 May 2012	incumbent	Paolo Bordignon	Lega Nord	

== Transport ==
=== Road ===
Rosà is crossed by:

- SS 47 Valsugana which joins Padua to Trento
- SR 245 Castellana which joins Rosà to Mestre
- SP 58 which joins Rosàto Nove

=== Railways ===
Rosà has a railway station on the Padua - Bassano line.

=== Urban mobility ===
==== Bus ====
The municipality is located on the bus line Bassano del Grappa - Padua and on the Bassano del Grappa - Rossano Veneto line.

==== Bicycle path ====
The city center is joined with the frazioni and the neighbouring municipalities of Bassano del Grappa, Rossano Veneto and Cartigliano by 21 km of bicycle path.

=== Airport ===
The nearest international airports are Venice Marco Polo Airport and Treviso Airport.

== International relations ==
Rosà is twinned with:

- Schallstadt, Germany, since 1991
- La Crau, France, since 2006

== See also ==
- Parco rurale sovracomunale Civiltà delle Rogge
