= Cappeller Fauna Park =

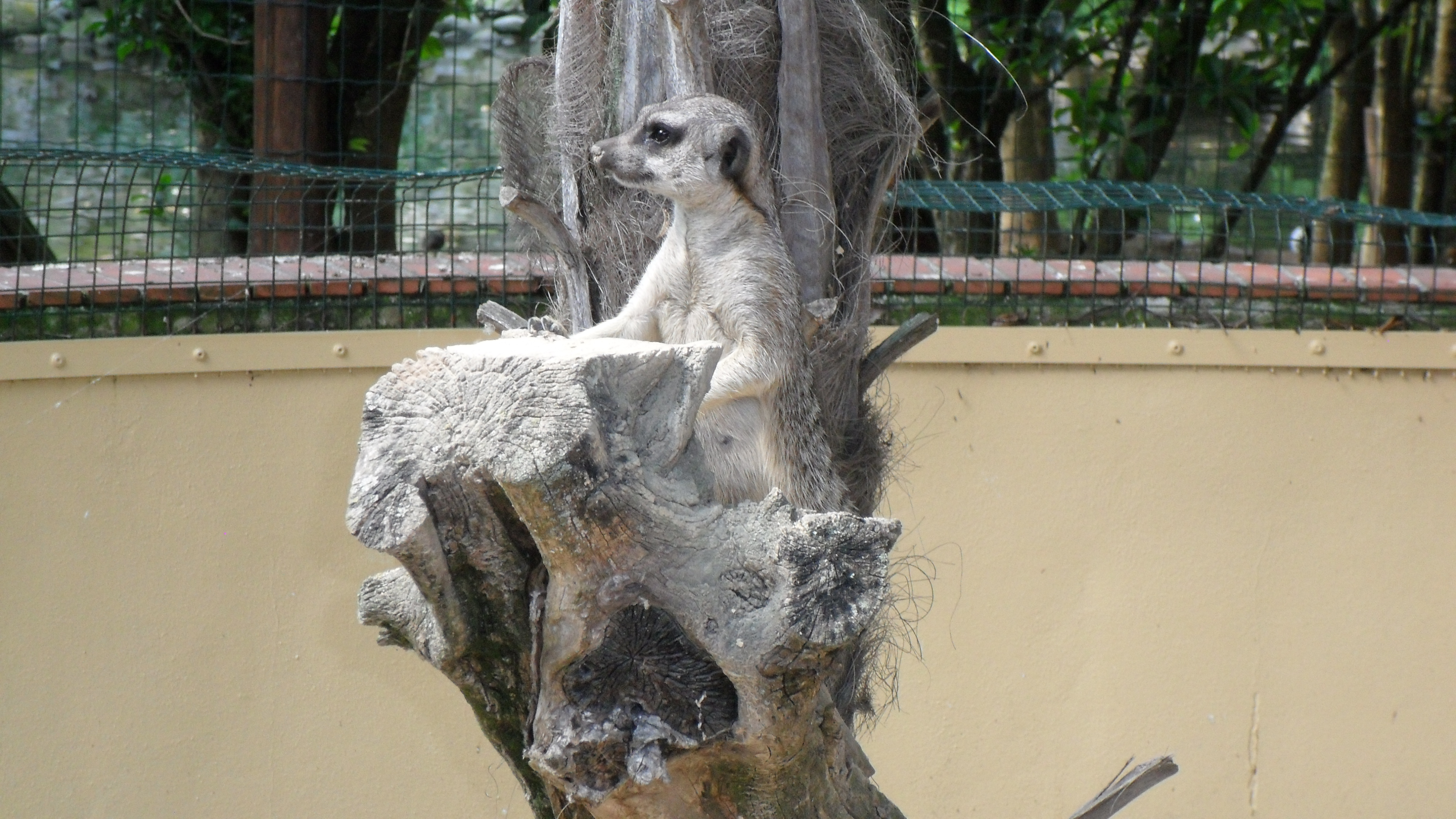
- Meerkat
- 45°43′13″N 11°41′57″E
- Date opened: 1998
- Location: Cartigliano, Italy
- Land area: 4 hectares (9.9 acres)
- Website: http://parcocappeller.it/

Cappeller Fauna Park is a zoo and amusement park in Cartigliano, Veneto, northern Italy. Opened in 1998, it extends over an area of 4 hectares.

== Gallery ==
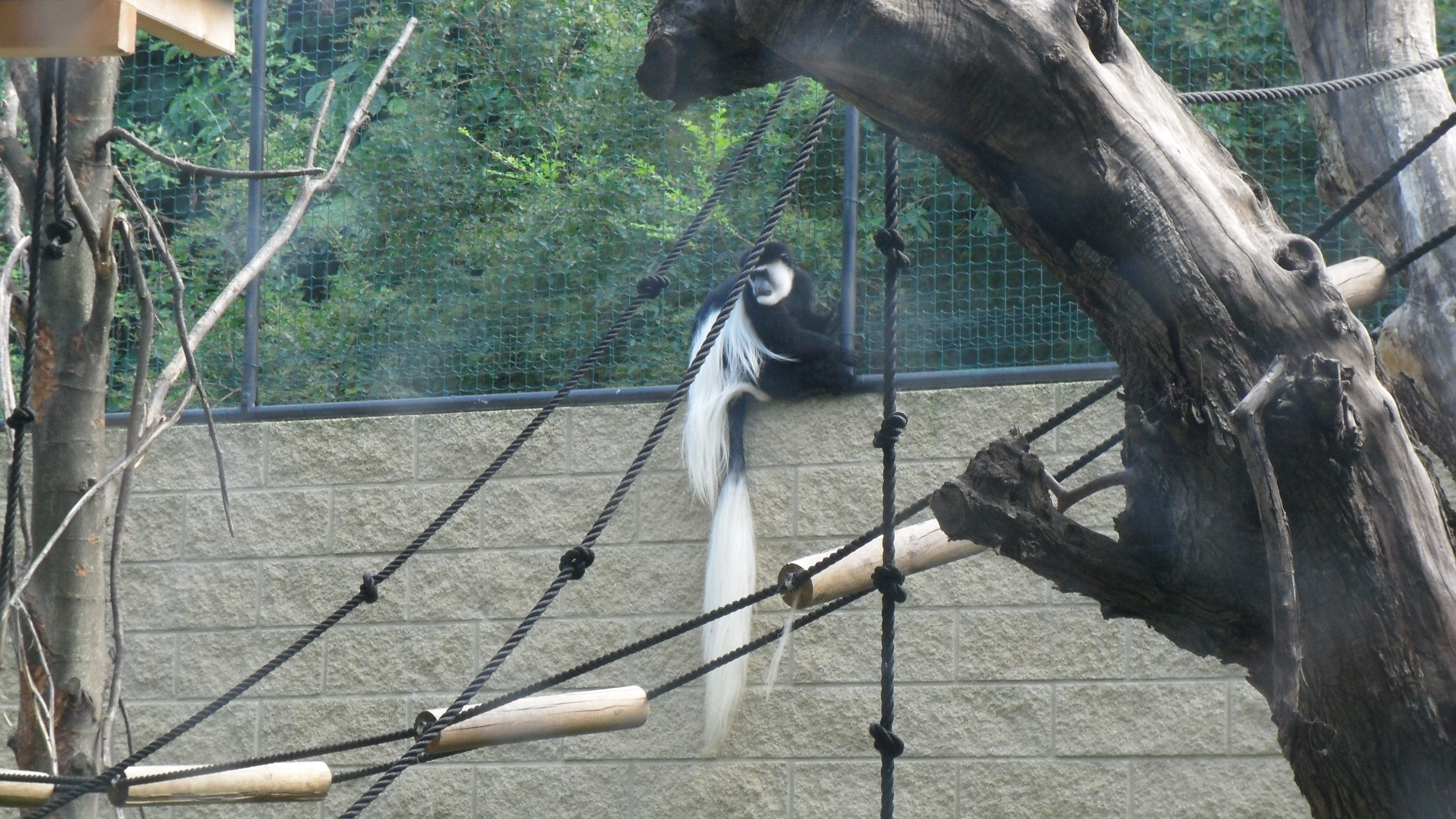
Mantled guereza
