= List of Marine Protected Areas of Italy =

This list is of the Marine Protected Areas (Italian: aree marine protette) of Italy. As of the most recent Official list of natural protected areas [it], decreed on 27 April 2010 and published in the official gazette on 31 May 2010 by the Ministry for Environment, Land and Sea Protection, there were twenty-seven such marine protected areas, and a further two "Submerged Archaeological Parks" (Italian: parchi sommersi); in 2018, two new marine protected areas were created. Typically subdivided into Zones A, B, and C, each affording a different level of protection, these areas help safeguard in total some 228,000 hectares (2,280 km^{2}) of the seas around Italy as well as some 700 kilometres (430 mi) of its coastline. The Ligurian Sea Cetacean Sanctuary is not included in these figures. While some stakeholders have opposed such measures, fearing the impact on short-term economic exploitation, a study of the alternatives at Portofino suggested that steps towards protection might offer not only environmental benefits but also the concomitant potential of enhanced long-term usufruct.

== List of Marine Protected Areas ==
Name	Image	Region	Area (km^{2})	Coast (km)	Established	Coordinates	EUAP Code	Ref.
Capo Caccia - Isola Piana		Sardinia	26.31	36.14	2002	40°34′09″N 8°09′56″E	EUAP0554	
Capo Carbonara		Sardinia	143.60	34.21	1998	39°05′29″N 9°31′29″E	EUAP0953	
Capo Gallo - Isola delle Femmine		Sicily	21.73	16.12	2002	38°12′34″N 13°14′19″E	EUAP0555	
Capo Milazzo		Sicily	7.55	5.67	2018	38°16′18″N 15°13′42″E		
Capo Rizzuto		Calabria	147.21	42.15	1991	38°57′06″N 17°10′17″E	EUAP0166	
Capo Testa - Punta Falcone		Sardinia	51.42	41.70	2018	41°14′47″N 9°09′43″E		
Cinque Terre		Liguria	45.54	19.30	1997	44°08′18″N 9°38′30″E	EUAP0948	
Costa degli Infreschi e della Masseta		Campania	23.32	13.81	2009	40°00′37″N 15°26′20″E	EUAP1228	
Isola dell'Asinara		Sardinia	107.32	79.64	2002	40°59′04″N 8°14′07″E	EUAP0552	
Isola di Bergeggi		Liguria	2.03	1.92	2007	44°14′08″N 8°26′38″E	EUAP0911	
Isola di Ustica		Sicily	159.51	14.45	1986	38°41′36″N 13°11′07″E	EUAP0170	
Isole Ciclopi		Sicily	6.28	6.24	1989	37°33′32″N 15°09′49″E	EUAP0171	
Isole Egadi		Sicily	539.92	73.99	1991	37°55′54″N 12°21′21″E	EUAP0172	
Area Marina Protetta Isole Pelagie		Sicily	41.36	46.28	2002	35°31′48″N 12°33′03″E	EUAP0553	
Tremiti Islands		Apulia	14.66	20.41	1989	42°07′37″N 15°30′10″E	EUAP0168	
Isole di Ventotene e Santo Stefano		Lazio	27.99	9.84	1997	40°47′30″N 13°26′23″E	EUAP0947	
Miramare		Friuli-Venezia Giulia	0.30	1.10	1986	45°42′11″N 13°42′41″E	EUAP0167	
Penisola del Sinis - Isola Mal di Ventre		Sardinia	267.03	30.08	1997	39°59′12″N 8°18′19″E	EUAP0951	
Plemmirio		Sicily	24.29	14.35	2004	37°00′09″N 15°19′43″E	EUAP0512	
Porto Cesareo		Apulia	166.54	32.71	1997	40°15′19″N 17°53′05″E	EUAP0950	
Portofino		Liguria	3.46	13.89	1998	44°18′02″N 9°13′04″E	EUAP0949	
Punta Campanella		Campania	15.39	31.43	1997	40°34′12″N 14°19′26″E	EUAP0946	
Regno di Nettuno		Campania	112.56	52.39	2007	40°44′29″N 13°59′16″E	EUAP0917	
Santa Maria di Castellabate		Campania	70.95	19.26	2009	40°15′18″N 14°54′26″E	EUAP1225	
Secche della Meloria		Tuscany	93.72	0.21	2009	43°32′55″N 10°12′27″E	EUAP1227	
Tavolara - Punta Coda Cavallo		Sardinia	153.57	76.09	1997	40°51′39″N 9°43′31″E	EUAP0952	
Secche di Tor Paterno		Lazio	13.87	0.00	2000	41°37′03″N 12°27′26″E	EUAP1172	
Torre del Cerrano		Abruzzo	34.30	7.10	2009	42°35′08″N 14°05′25″E	EUAP1226	
Torre Guaceto		Apulia	22.27	8.41	1991	40°43′01″N 17°47′55″E	EUAP0169	

== List of Submerged Archaeological Parks ==
Name	Image	Region	Area (km^{2})	Coast (km)	Established	Coordinates	EUAP Code	Ref.
Baia		Campania	1.77	3.72	2002	40°49′19″N 14°04′39″E	EUAP0849	
Gaiola		Campania	0.41	1.99	2002	40°47′31″N 14°11′13″E	EUAP0850	

== See also ==
- Conservation in Italy
- List of National Parks of Italy
- List of Regional Parks of Italy
