= Parco rurale sovracomunale Civiltà delle Rogge =

Regional park in Veneto, Italy

Coordinates: 45°43′34″N 11°42′25″E

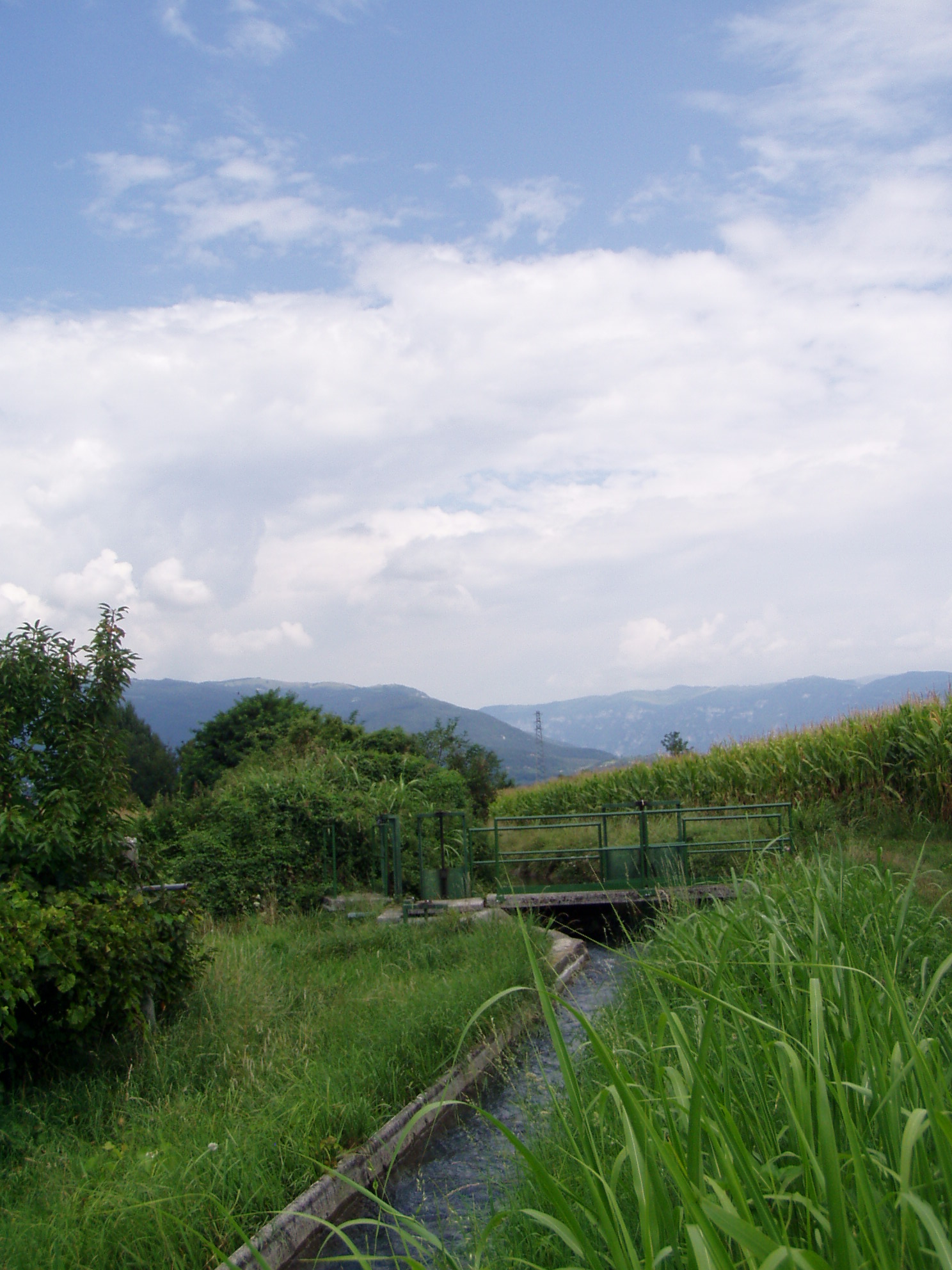
A rosta (irrigation ditch) flowing through cultivated fields in Parco "Civiltà delle Rogge". In the background (northwards), Asiago plateau and Grappa mountain.

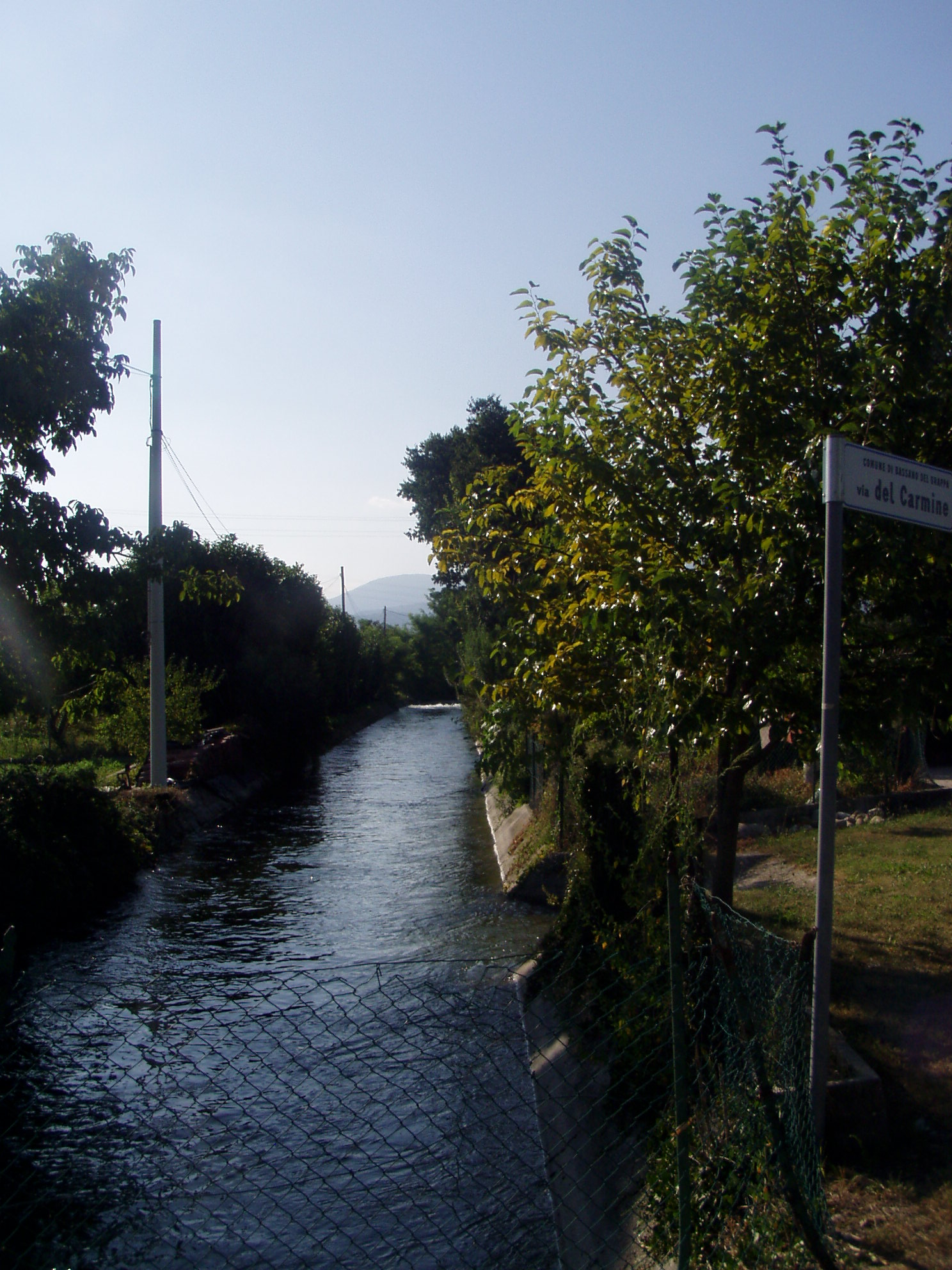
Rosta Rosà flowing out from Parco "Civiltà delle Rogge" near Bassano del Grappa practical exclaves (to the right) and the territory of Rosà (to the left)

The Parco rurale sovracomunale "Civiltà delle Rogge", often called Parco delle Rogge, is a regional park of local interest as per regional law of Veneto 40/1984, art.27. It is included in the municipal territories of Bassano del Grappa, Cartigliano and Rosà, province of Vicenza, Veneto. The park was established under the provisions of Government of Veneto's deliberations no.801/2002, 1272/2002 e 3283/2002 and has an area of about 250 ha, of which 150 ha are within the municipality of Rosà.

== Geographical location ==
The park has an irregular perimeter. The area of the park is bounded by Strada Provinciale 111 (Nuova Gasparona) to the north and by Strada Provinciale 58 (Ca' Dolfin) to the south. The eastern boundary of the park runs near via Molino in località Baggi in Rosà, while the westernmost side stretches parallel to the boundary between Quartiere Pre in Bassano del Grappa and the municipality of Cartigliano, but some meters within the territory of Bassano. A number of small roads runs through the park, mainly stretching from the east to the west, but they are not always connected to each other: in some cases it is necessary to exit the area of the park, move northwards or southwards, and then re-enter the park. The park can be accessed from the following main points:

- North: Via Riva Bianca, in Quartier Prè, Bassano del Grappa (it becomes Via del Carmine, in Rosà)
- West: Via delle Orchidee (Cavinón), in Quartier Prè, Bassano del Grappa (it becomes Via del Rosario, entering Rosà)
- West: Via San Giorgio, along the border between Bassano del Grappa and Cartigliano (it becomes Via Monte San Michele, in Rosà)
- South: Via Monte San Michele, in Rosà (it then becomes Via San Giorgio, entering Cartigliano)
- South and east: Via Capitello, in Travettore, Rosà
- East: Via del Rosario (Cavinón), in Travettore, Rosà (it becomes Via delle Orchidee, entering Bassano del Grappa)
- East: Via del Carmine, in Ponte Storto, Rosà (it becomes Via Riva Bianca, in Bassano del Grappa)

== Peculiarities ==
Within the rural park, mostly consisting of the old lands of aristocratic family Morosin, a network of irrigation ditches flows. These ditches, called roste by locals, were built over the centuries under different dominations and still reach a number of municipalities well beyond the boundaries of the park. The park is thus a valuable testimony of the old holding structure in the area, before the urban drift of the last century. In the territory of the park there are also one of the last Roman unmade roads left in Veneto, the decumanus DD IX called Cavinón (that is, big cavìn, a word that in venetian language indicates a boundary path between two or more fields), and a small church dating back to the period of the Longobards, the church of San Giorgio (Saint George). Various findings of the period of ancient Adriatic Veneti have been dug out in the areas near the park. Administratively, there are some municipal practical exclaves within and close to the park boundaries. Via del Carmine is a road that runs irregularly along the boundary between Bassano del Grappa, to the north, and Rosà, to the south: some houses in territory of Bassano, on the northern side, can be reached through the street only from Rosà, in the south. In some case, the street that reaches the exclaves also crosses one of the channels that flow through the park.
