= Area Marina Protetta Isole Pelagie =

The Area marina protetta Isole Pelagie (Pelagian Islands marine protected area) is a marine protected area established by decree of the Italian Ministry of the Environment on 21 October 2002.

== Territory ==
The MPA of the Pelagian Islands includes 46.28 kilometres (28.76 mi) of coast of the islands of Lampedusa, Linosa and Lampione, along with the marine extension of 4,136 hectares (10,220 acres).

== Flora and Fauna ==
The area includes some important nesting sites for the sea turtle Caretta caretta. The islands of Linosa (Pozzolana di Ponente beach) and Lampedusa (Isola dei Conigli beach) are among the few sites in Italy where the presence of regular egg-laying by some specimens is documented and certain. Unfortunately, the density of mass tourism and the growing frequency of tourism on foot (still permitted) are causing the Isola dei Conigli beach to lose all its attractiveness for the turtles' egg-laying. In 2007 and 2008, no nests were recorded in Lampedusa. However, egg-laying resumed in June 2009. On the southern side of the island of Lampedusa, large areas of vermeti trottoir, deriving from Posidonia oceanica (seagrass) meadows in the MPA, can be observed, a typical feature of Mediterranean ecology.

== See also ==
- Pelagian Islands
- List of Marine Protected Areas of Italy
