= Pantelleria National Park =

National park in Italy

- Parco Nazionale Isola de Pantelleria
- IUCN category II (national park)
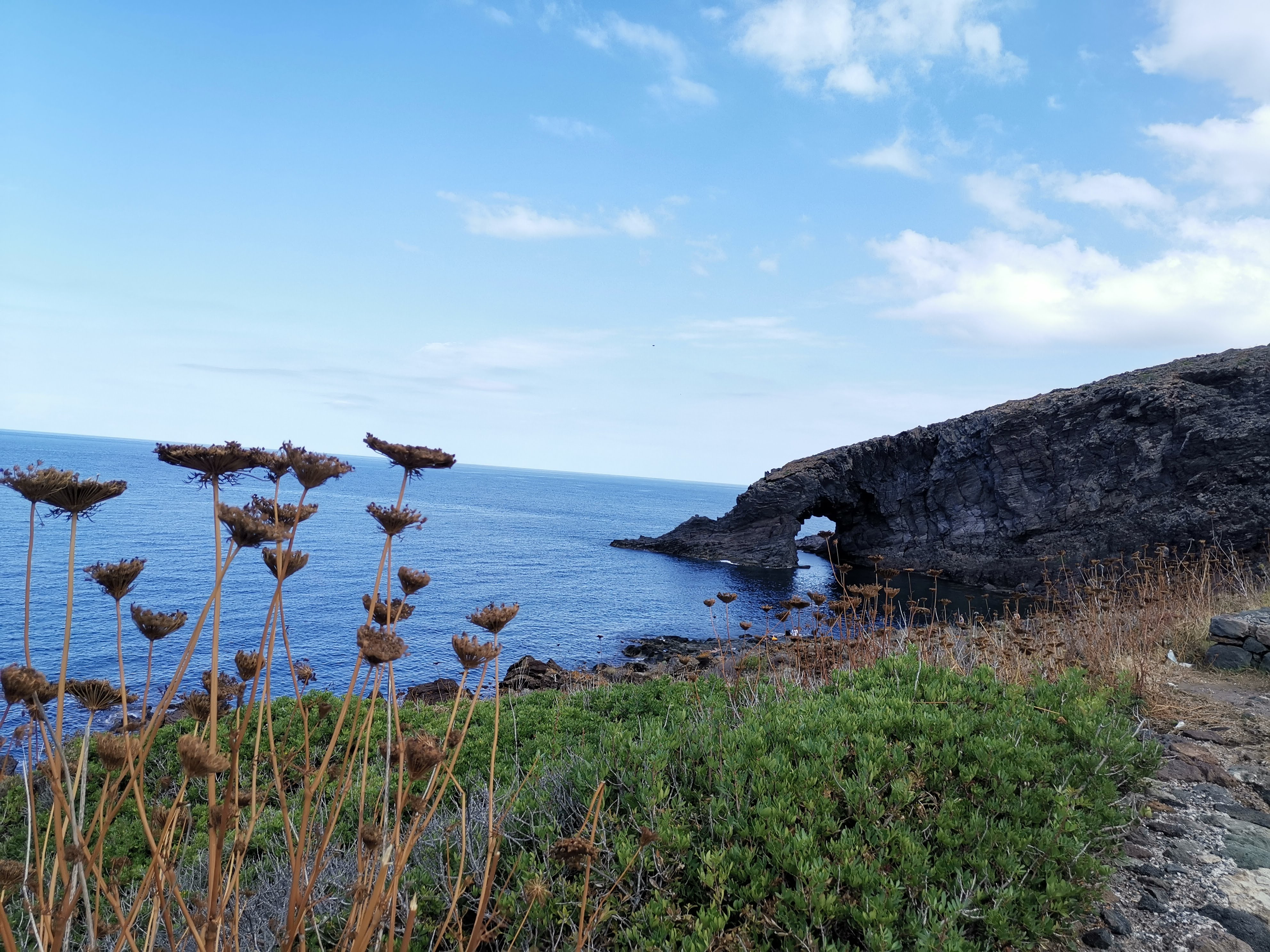
- Arch of the Elephant
- Interactive map of Pantelleria National Park
- Location: Pantelleria
- Coordinates: 36°46′50″N 12°00′10″E
- Area: 66.4 km^{2} (25.6 sq mi)
- Established: 2016
- Governing body: Ministero dell'Ambiente
- Website: www.parconazionalepantelleria.it/Eindex.php

Pantelleria National Park (Italian: Parco Nazionale Isola de Pantelleria) is an Italian national park on the island of Pantelleria. The park was established in 2016, and covers an area of 66.4 km^{2} (25.6 sq mi), or 80% of the island.
