= Adamello Brenta Natural Park =

Protected area in Italy

Parco naturale Adamello Brenta
- IUCN category IV (habitat/species management area)
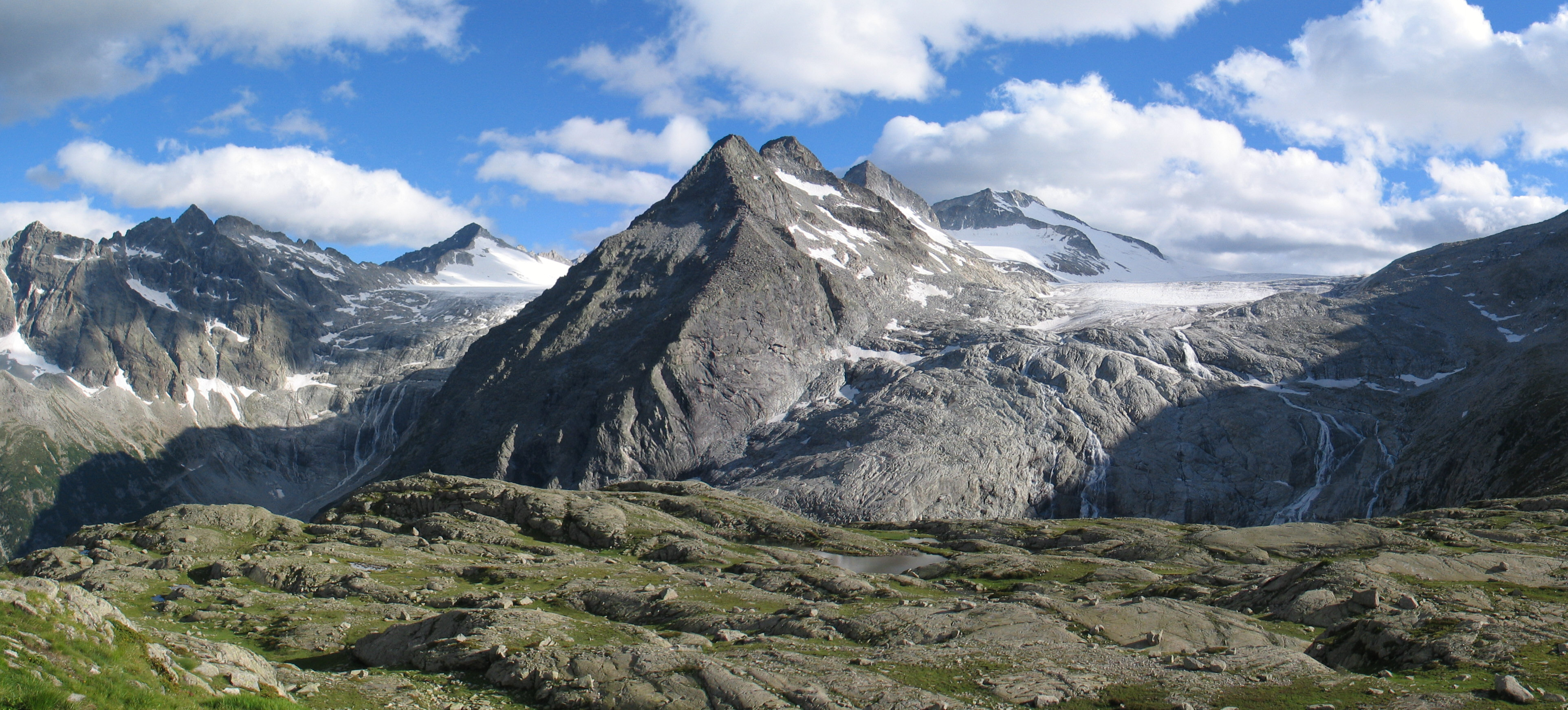

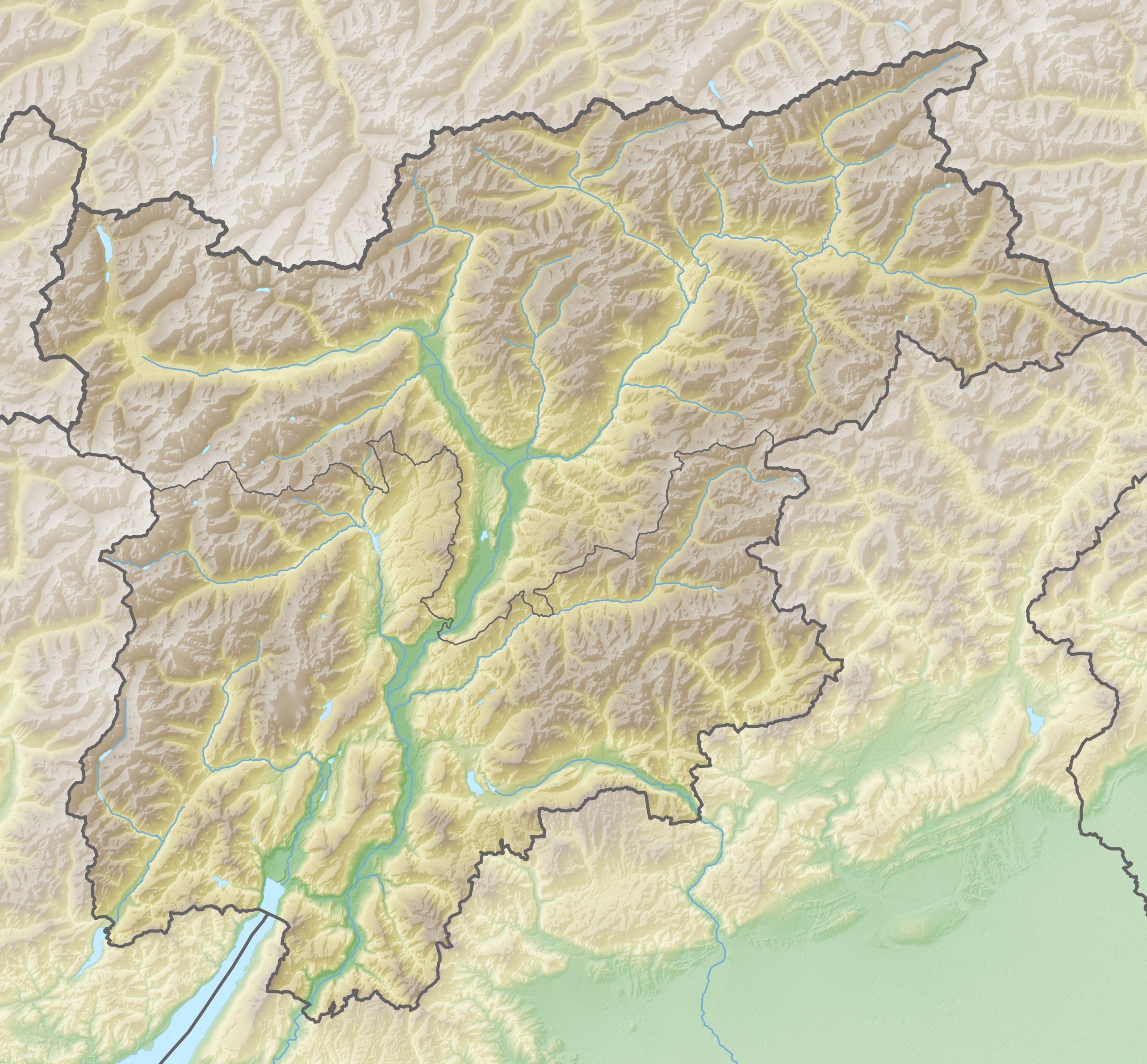
- Location within Trentino-Alto Adige/Südtirol Location within Italy
- Location: Trentino, Italy
- Nearest city: Trento
- Coordinates: 46.22°N 10.86°E
- Area: 62,051 ha (153,330 acres)
- Established: 1967
- Website: www.pnab.it

The Adamello Brenta Natural Park (Italian: Parco naturale Adamello Brenta) is a nature reserve in Trentino, Italy. Established in 1967, it encompasses most of the Adamello-Presanella Alps as well as the Brenta Dolomites; it is the largest natural park in Trentino and along with the adjacent Stelvio National Park, Swiss National Park and Adamello Regional Park, it forms the largest protected area in the Alps, nearly 400,000 hectares. It joined the Global Geoparks Network in 2008, becoming a UNESCO Global Geopark when the designation was ratified in 2015.

== History ==
In 1919, Professor Giovanni Pedrotti, a mountaineer and scholar from Trento, began a campaign of public awareness in the hopes of establishing a national park in western Trentino, but the initiative found no success.

In 1928, Gian Giacomo Gallarati Scotti revived the idea of a park, after concluding through fieldwork that the survival of the Alpine brown bear depended on the protection of its natural habitat. Through the joint intervention of senators Cesare Nava and Giberto Borromeo, he was able to submit a proposal to Alessandro Martelli, then Minister of the National Economy, but despite an initially favourable reception the matter came to nothing.

Between 1936 and 1940, the debate over the park reached the broader public. With numerous articles appeared in newspapers and journals, reflecting a disagreement over its purpose. Senators Carlo Bonardi and Ottorino Carletti led a faction that favoured establishing the park primarily for tourism, opposing those who wanted a scientifically focused reserve. Among the local population in Trentino, many feared that a reserve would bring restrictions on their land and activities. The most prominent local opponent was Lino Bonomi, director of the Trentino Museum of Natural Sciences in Trento.

In 1949 Fausto Stefenelli and in 1950 Paolo Videsott submitted separate legislative proposals to the Regional Council of Trentino-Alto Adige/Südtirol for the establishment of a national park. The Region chose to proceed on the basis of Videsott's proposal, which called for the park to be merged with the existing Stelvio National Park and for management to pass to a specially appointed local body. The Ministry of Agriculture and Forests, the Italian Touring Club and the Italian Alpine Club all opposed the project, and proposals stalled for over a decade.

The park was finally established in 1967 under the name "Adamello Brenta Natural Park." In 1983, on the Lombardy side, this was complemented by the creation of the regional Adamello Park. The park's first president was Carlo Eligio Valentini.

== Flora and fauna ==
The park is home to 1,300 species of plants and flowers as well as numerous animals, including the brown bear; in fact, by the 1990s the last surviving specimens of brown bear in the Italian Alps lived in the Brenta Dolomites, and the population was brought back from near-extinction (two or three specimens) to the current population of over ninety specimens thanks to a reintroduction project funded by the European Union, making the brown bear the symbol of the park. The park's fauna also includes 8,000 chamoises, 3,500 roe deer and 1,300 red deer, as well as alpine ibexes, marmots, and 113 species of birds, including twenty-eight golden eagles. 41 glaciers and 48 lakes are located within its territory, as well as twelve mountain huts, seven visitor centers and over 1,000 kilometers of hiking paths; the highest point of the park is Cima Presanella, 3,558 meters above sea level, whereas the lowest point is 447 meters above sea level.
