= Lakes of Porcile =

Group of three lakes in the Orobian Alps, Italy

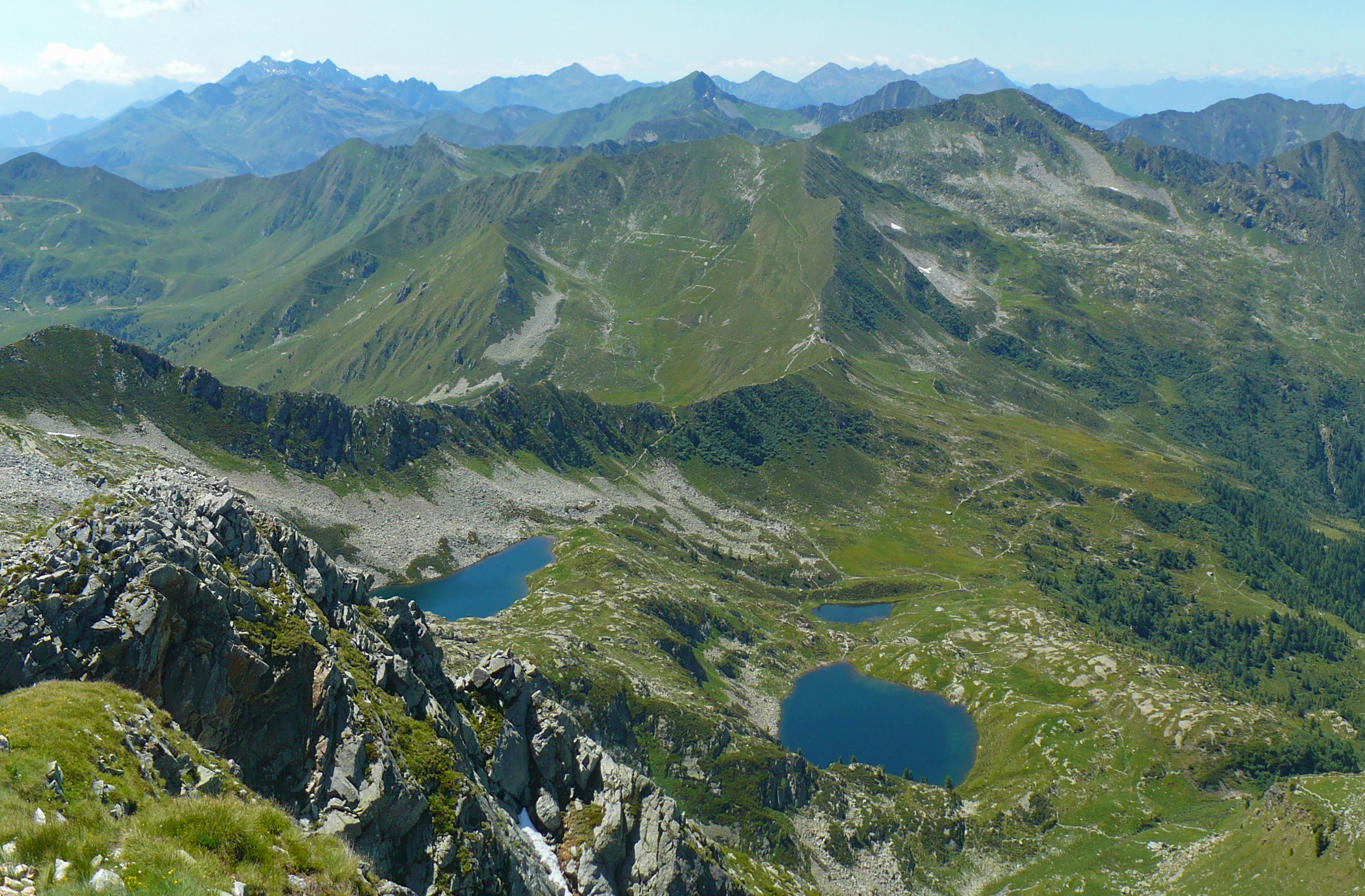
- Lakes of Porcile as seen from the summit of Mount Cadelle
- Interactive map of Lakes of Porcile
- Location: Province of Sondrio, Lombardy, Italy
- Coordinates: 46°03′49″N 9°43′57″E
- Surface area: 05 km^{2} (1.9 sq mi)
- Max. depth: 4 m (13 ft)
- Surface elevation: 2,050 m (6,730 ft)

The Lakes of Porcile (not to be confused with the Lakes of Percile) are a group of three small alpine lakes located in the Orobic Alps, within the Val Lunga—one of the two main branches of Val Tartano. Val Tartano is part of the Valtellina Orobie Park, a protected area comprising twelve valleys in the Lombardy region of northern Italy. The lakes primarily collect rainwater and snowmelt originating from the surrounding peaks, including Mount Cadelle, Mount Valegino, Porcile Pass, and Valle dei Lupi. A steep mountain trail connects the lakes to the nearby Tartano Pass, providing access for hikers and visitors.

== Access ==
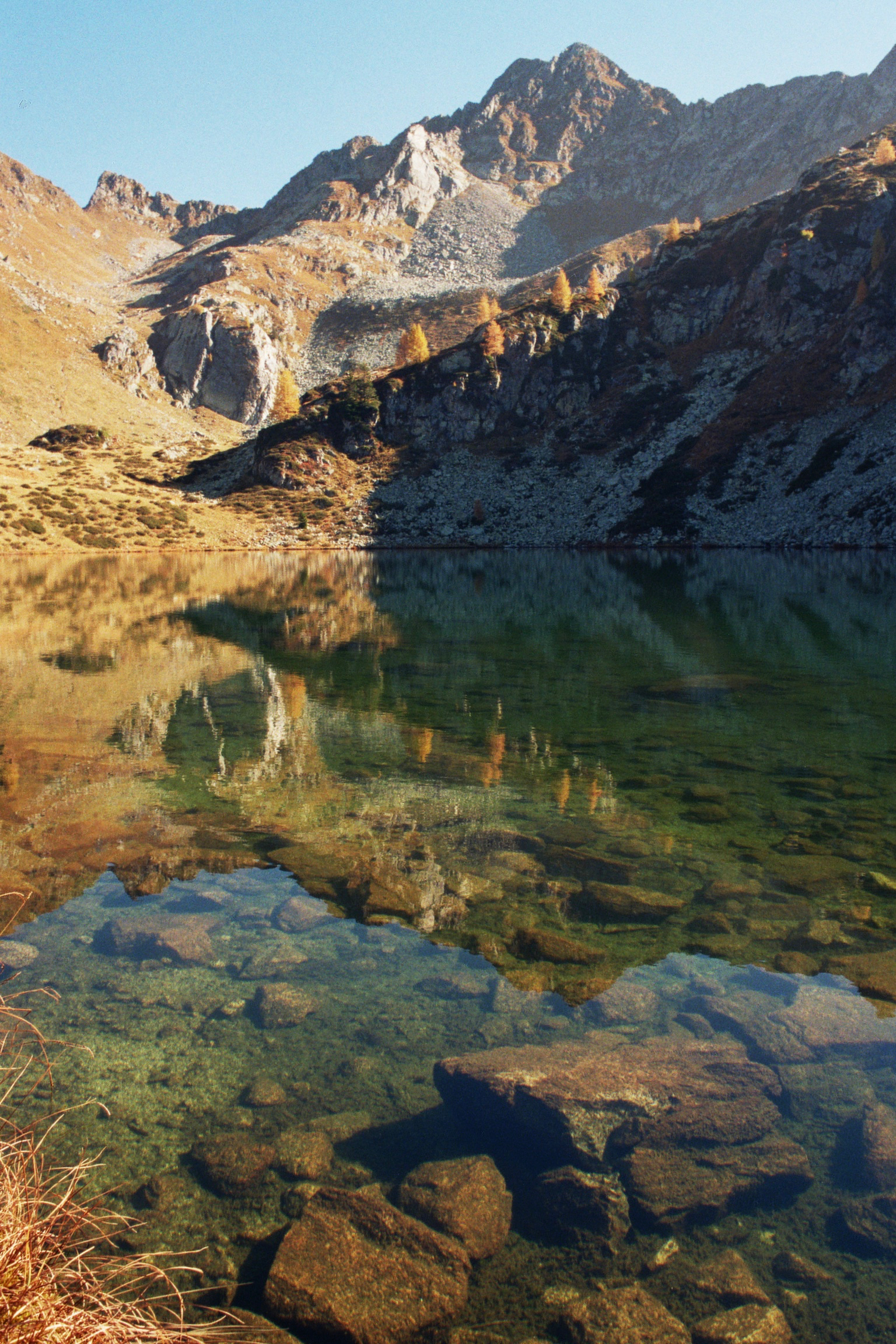
Cadelle Mountain is reflected in the waters of the lakes.

The Lakes of Porcile can be reached via several hiking routes, the most common of which originate from the Brembana Valley and the village of Tartano. From the Brembana Valley, the trail begins near the Rifugio Camoscio (Chamois Hut) in San Simone, a hamlet of Valleve. The route initially follows an unpaved carriage road heading east, running along the base of the Lemma peaks at a nearly constant elevation in a semicircular path. Approximately one kilometre from the starting point, the road transitions into a footpath that ascends gradually. After crossing a cattle pasture, the trail climbs more steeply in a series of switchbacks, eventually reaching the Tartano Pass. From the pass, the route continues eastward along a descending path that leads directly to the lakes.

Hikers approaching from Morbegno typically drive to the village of Tartano, from where a trail begins that ascends approximately 600 metres in elevation to reach the lakes. This path is known for being relatively comfortable despite the elevation gain. The Gran Via delle Orobie, a long-distance alpine hiking trail, also passes by the Lakes of Porcile. The lakes are located along the segment connecting Arale to the Rifugio Dordona and continuing on to the Rifugio Caprari.
