= Gran Bosco di Salbertrand Natural Park =

Nature reserve in Piedmont, Italy

- Parco naturale del Gran Bosco di Salbertrand
- IUCN category IV (habitat/species management area)
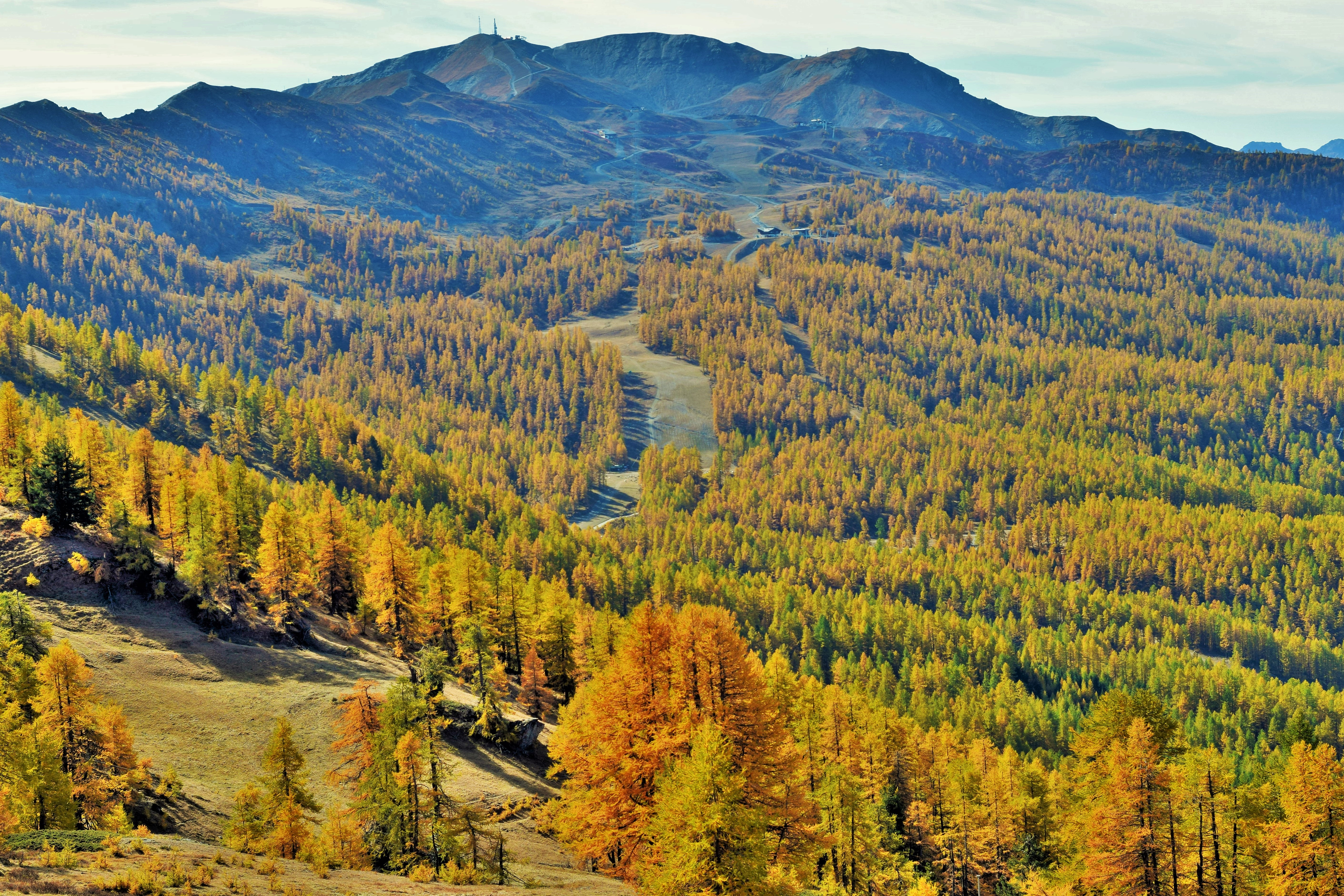

- Location within Italy
- Location: Piedmont, Italy
- Nearest city: Turin
- Coordinates: 45°03′40″N 6°56′25″E
- Area: 3,774 ha (14.57 sq mi)
- Elevation: 2,700 m (8,900 ft)
- Established: 1980
- Website: www.parchialpicozie.it

The Gran Bosco di Salbertrand Natural Park (Italian: Parco naturale del Gran Bosco di Salbertrand) is a nature reserve in Piedmont, Italy. Established in 1980, it protects the Site of Community Importance of the Great Woods of Salbertrand (Gran Bosco di Salbertrand), in the Val Susa, south of the Dora Riparia, between 1,000 and 2,700 metres above sea level. The woods, which cover an area of about eight hundred hectares, consist of a mix of silver fir and Norway spruce, rarely found in the Western Alps.

About 70% of the park's territory consists of woods, the remaining 30% of pastures and grasslands. Since 2009 the park, which covers the territory of seven municipalities in the Province of Turin, has been managed by the Ente di gestione delle aree protette delle Alpi Cozie, along with the Val Troncea, Lakes of Avigliana and Orsiera-Rocciavrè natural parks and the natural reserves of the gorges of Foresto and Chianocco.

The park's flora consists of over six hundred species of plants, including silver fir, larch, Norway spruce, Swiss pine and Scots pine. The fauna consists of 21 species of mammals, including red deer, roe deer, chamois, wild boar, marmots, foxes, red squirrels, stoats and wolves, and 70 species of birds, including golden eagle, sparrowhawk, goshawk, common buzzard, rock partridge and black grouse.
