= Adamello Regional Park =

Protected area in Italy

Parco regionale dell'Adamello
- IUCN category V (protected landscape/seascape)
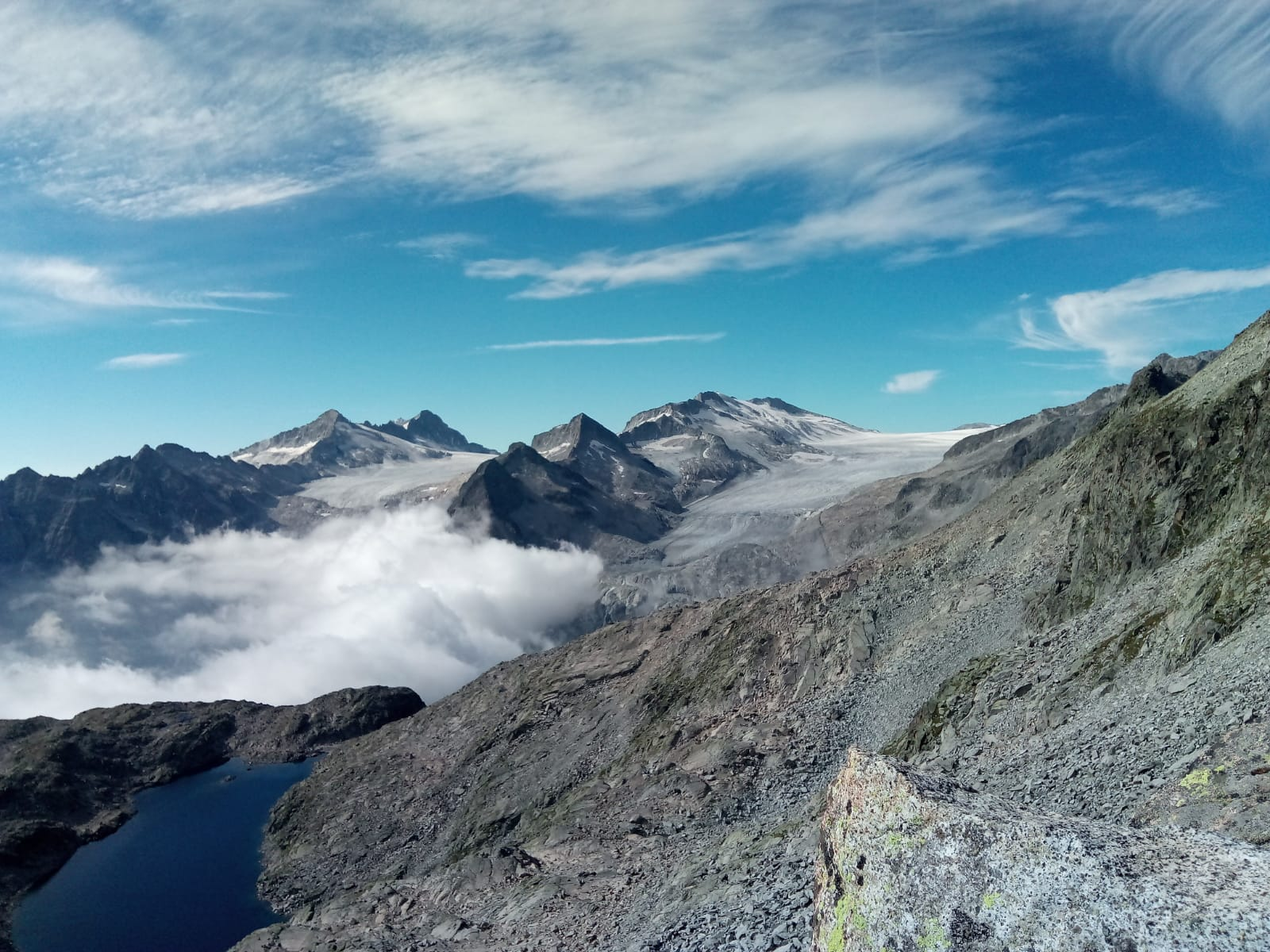

- Location within Italy Location within Lombardy
- Location: Lombardy, Italy
- Coordinates: 46°05′30″N 10°25′50″E
- Area: 50,935 ha (125,860 acres)
- Established: 1983
- Website: www.parcoadamello.it

The Adamello Regional Park (Italian: Parco regionale dell'Adamello) is a nature reserve in Lombardy, Italy. Established in 1983, it encompasses the Lombard portion of the Adamello-Presanella Alps; together with the adjacent Stelvio National Park, Swiss National Park and Adamello Brenta Natural Park, it forms the largest protected area in the Alps, nearly 400,000 hectares.

The park has an area of over 50,000 hectares, ranging in elevation from 390 to 3,539 meters above sea level. The Adamello Glacier, the largest glacier in Italy (16 square kilometres), is located within the park. The park's fauna includes the brown bear, the wolf, the red deer, the roe deer, the alpine ibex, the chamois, the marmot, the stoat, the golden eagle, the rock ptarmigan and the western capercaillie.

Twenty-five mountain huts, eight mountain shelters and over a thousand kilometers of hiking paths are located in the park's territory.
