= Monte Barro Natural Park =

Nature reserve in Lombardy, Italy

Parco naturale del Monte Barro
- Parco naturale del Monte Barro
- IUCN category V (protected landscape/seascape)
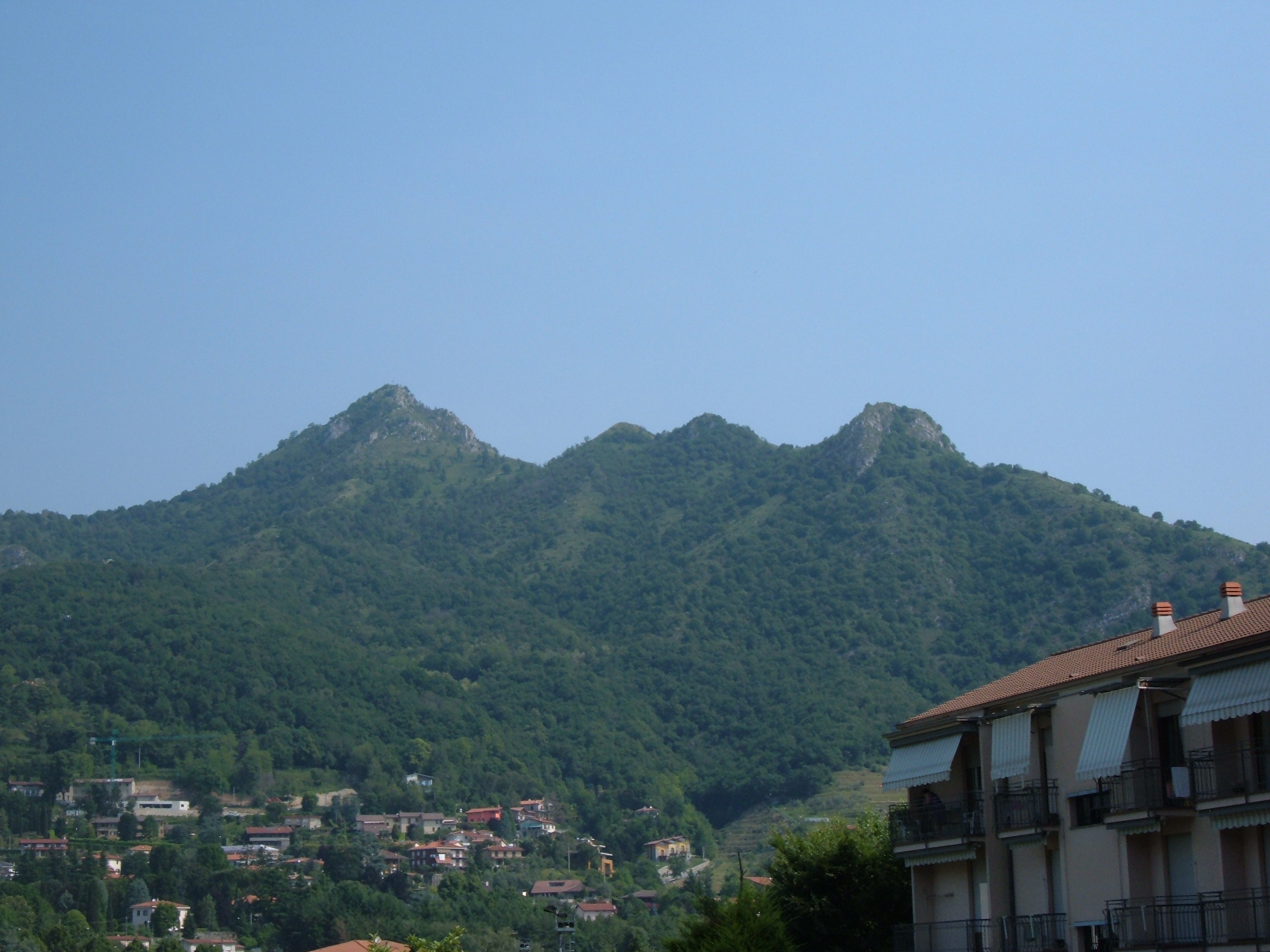
- Interactive map of Parco naturale del Monte Barro
- Location: Lombardy, Italy
- Coordinates: 45°49′52″N 09°22′17″E
- Area: 665 ha (1,640 acres)
- Established: 2002
- Website: www.parcobarro.lombardia.it

The Monte Barro Natural Park (Italian: Parco naturale del Monte Barro) is a nature reserve in Lombardy, Italy. Established in 2002, it encompasses the Monte Barro massif, a Site of Community Importance near Lecco, between Lake Como and the smaller lakes of Annone and Garlate.

Despite its small size, the park boasts a varied environment (grasslands, woodlands, and rocks) and considerable biological diversity, with over a thousand floral species in fewer than 700 acres, which led to the Center for the Indigenous Flora of Lombardy being established in the park.

The fauna includes fire salamanders, kestrels, common buzzards, black kites, peregrine falcons, hen harriers, common ravens, vipers and Aesculapian snakes.

The Piani di Barra archaeological park, centered on late Roman fortifications, is located inside the park, as is an ancient hermitage, today used as visitor center. The park offers a varied range of educational projects for schools.
