= Parco della Pineta di Appiano Gentile e Tradate =

Nature reserve in Lombardy, Italy

- IUCN category IV (habitat/species management area)
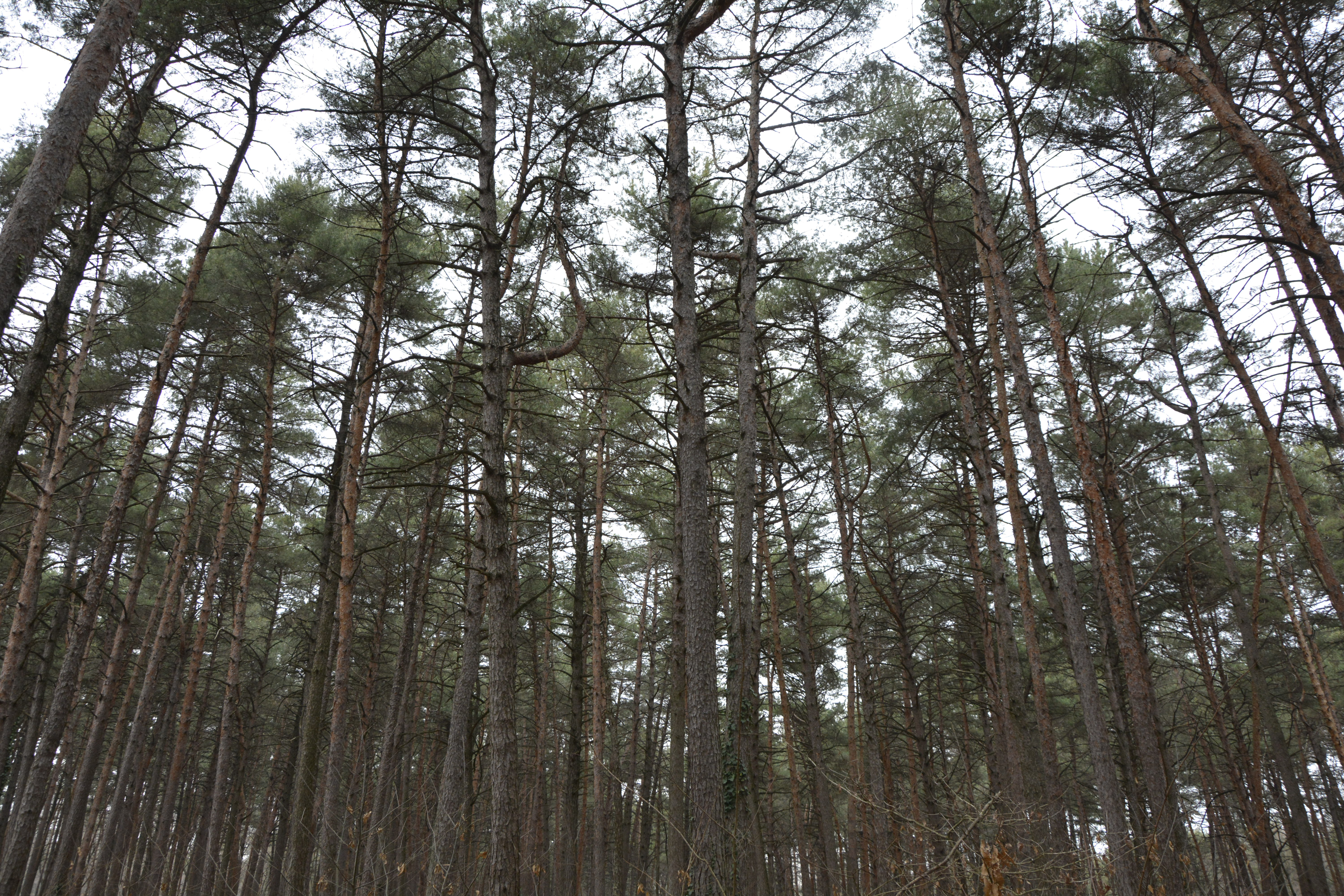

- Location within Italy Location within Lombardy
- Location: Lombardy, Italy
- Nearest city: Tradate
- Coordinates: 45.74°N 8.94°E
- Area: 4,860 ha (12,000 acres)
- Established: 1983
- Website: www.ateinsubriaolona.it/home-pineta/

The Parco della Pineta di Appiano Gentile e Tradate ("Tradate and Appiano Gentile pine forest park") is a nature reserve in Lombardy, Italy. Established in 1983, it covers the eponymous pine forest in northwestern Lombardy, between the provinces of Como and Varese, stretching over 4,800 hectares in the territory of fifteen municipalities. The Site of Community Importance of the pine forest of Appiano Gentile, part of the Natura 2000 network, is part of the park.

== Location ==
The park is located in the northern Po plain, at an elevation of 243–447 m (797–1,467 ft) above sea level. About 30 % of its territory is covered by the eponymous pine forest (mostly consisting of Scotch pines), another 30 % by chestnut woods, 25 % by locusts, 15 % by oaks, while the rest (about 1,300 hectares) consists of pastures and farmland. Some small strips of moorlands survive between Tradate and Carbonate.

== Fauna ==
The fauna includes red deer, roe deer, fallow deer, wild boars, badgers, foxes, dormouses, weasels, stoats, beech martens, rabbits, hares, squirrels, hedgehogs, moles, Eastern cottontails, herons, peregrine falcons, goshawks, buzzards, quails, pheasants, woodpeckers, as well as nine species of reptiles, eight species of amphibians, and nine species of fish.
