= Valtellina Orobic Alps Regional Park =

Italian nature reserve

Parco regionale delle Orobie Valtellinesi
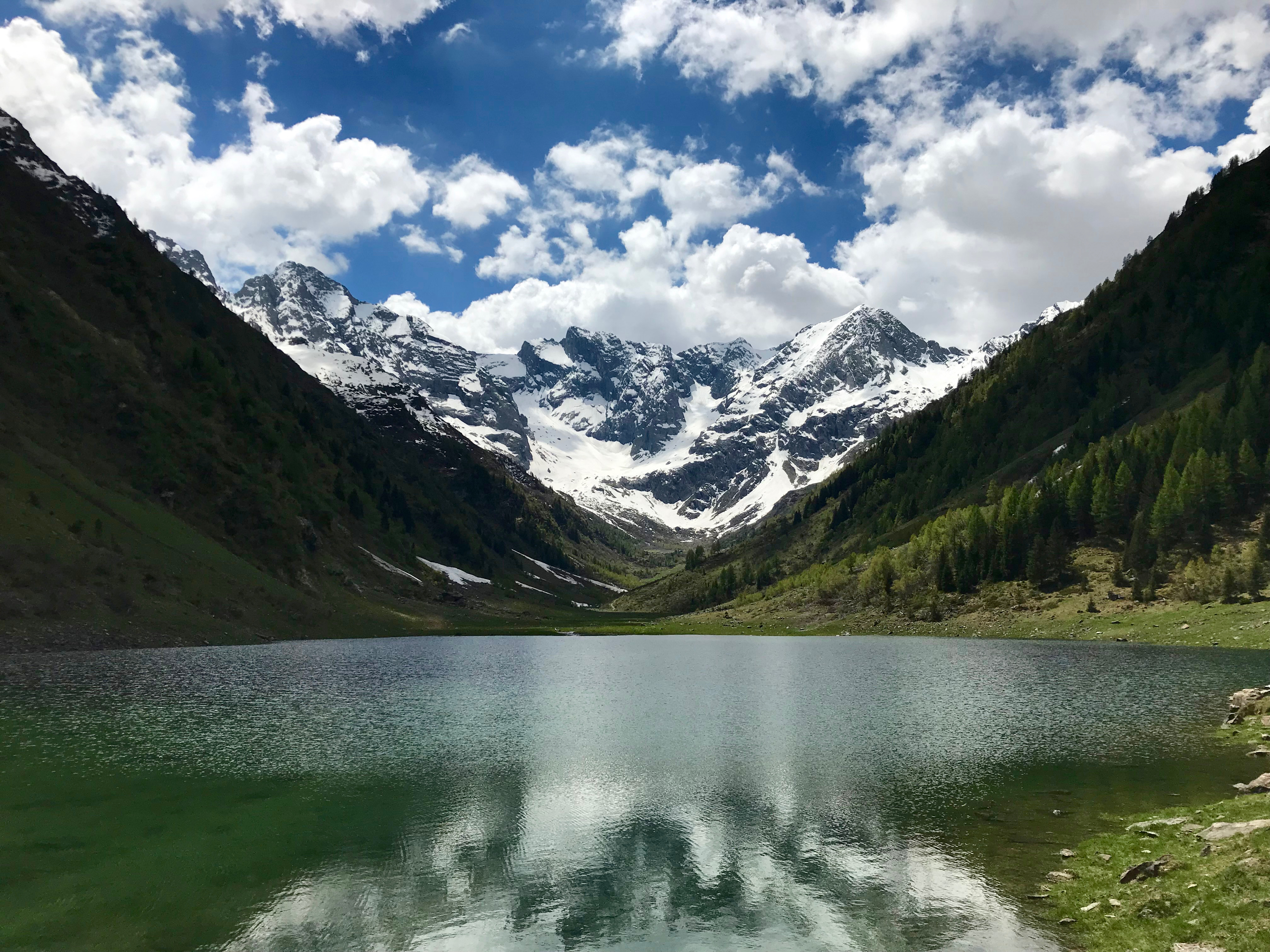
- Interactive map of Parco regionale delle Orobie Valtellinesi
- Location: Lombardy, Italy
- Coordinates: 46°05′20″N 9°50′50″E
- Area: 44,093 ha (108,960 acres)
- Established: 1989
- Website: www.parcorobievalt.com

The Valtellina Orobic Alps Regional Park (Italian: Parco regionale delle Orobie Valtellinesi) is a nature reserve in Lombardy, Italy. Established in 1989, it encompasses the northern side of the Orobic Alps, located in the province of Sondrio, on the southern side of the Valtellina (the southern side of the Orobic Alps, located in the province of Bergamo, is instead part of the adjacent Bergamasque Alps Regional Park).

The park has an area of 44,000 hectares, the highest point being Pizzo Coca, 3,052 metres above sea level, while the lowest point is 850 metres above sea level; the average altitude is 900 metres above sea level. The park includes 23,224 hectares of forest and 8,381 hectares of glaciers.

The fauna includes wolves, alpine ibexes, chamois (around 1,000 specimens), european mouflons (about seventy specimens, introduced in 1971), red deer (about ninety specimens), marmots, golden eagles, black grouse, and western capercaillie, the symbol of the park. Twelve areas of the park are designated as Sites of Community Importance and subjected to further protection as part of the Natura 2000 network

The park is crossed by the Gran Via delle Orobie, a 130-kilometre GR footpath which crosses the entire mountain range, from Delebio to Aprica. Thirty-two mountain huts and mountain shelters are located within its territory.

== See also ==
- Lakes of Porcile
