= Julian Prealps Natural Park =

Nature reserve in Friuli-Venezia Giulia, Italy

Parco Naturale delle Prealpi Giulie
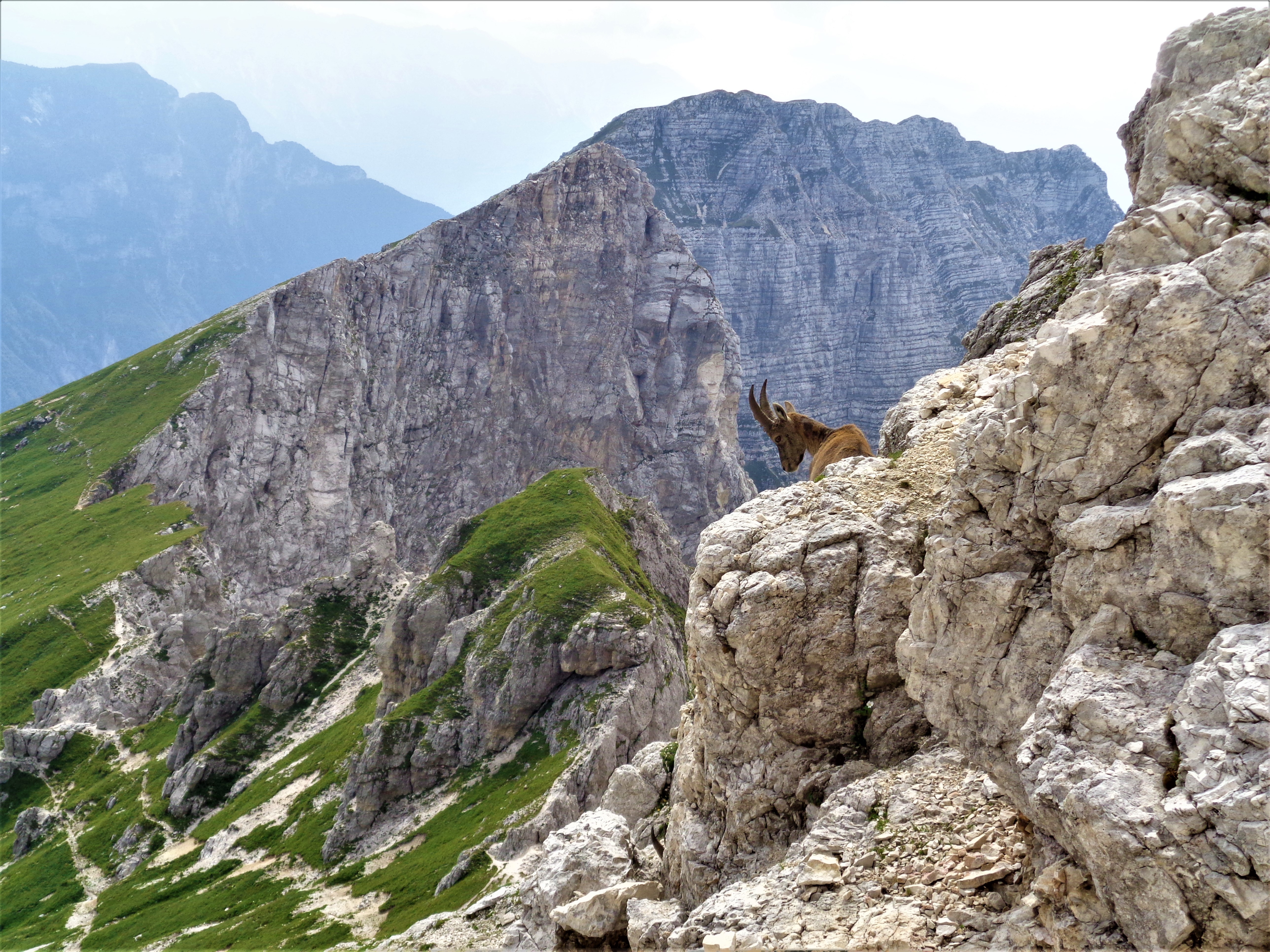
- Interactive map of Parco Naturale delle Prealpi Giulie
- Location: Friuli-Venezia Giulia, Italy
- Coordinates: 46°19′N 13°18′E
- Area: 9,402 ha (23,230 acres)
- Established: 1996
- Website: www.parcoprealpigiulie.it/it/

The Julian Prealps Natural Park (Italian: Parco Naturale delle Prealpi Giulie) is a nature reserve in Friuli-Venezia Giulia, Italy, near the border with Slovenia. Established in 1996, it stretches across the territory of six municipalities of the Province of Udine and has an area of nearly 10,000 ha (25,000 acres).

Despite its name, the park does not only cover the Julian Prealps but also some massifs of the Julian Alps, such as the Monte Canin.

The flora includes over 1,250 species of plants, sixty of which are endemic. About 60% of the wooded areas consist of European beeches, and 21% of Scotch pines and black pines.

The fauna includes red deer, roe deer, chamoises, alpine ibexes, wild boars and numerous birds, of which the rock partridge is especially widespread and has become the symbol of the park.

Six mountain huts and mountain shelters are located in the park.

The park is adjacent to Triglav National Park in nearby Slovenia.
