= Parco naturale Alta Valsesia =

Alpine regional park in Piedmont, Italy

- IUCN category V (protected landscape/seascape)
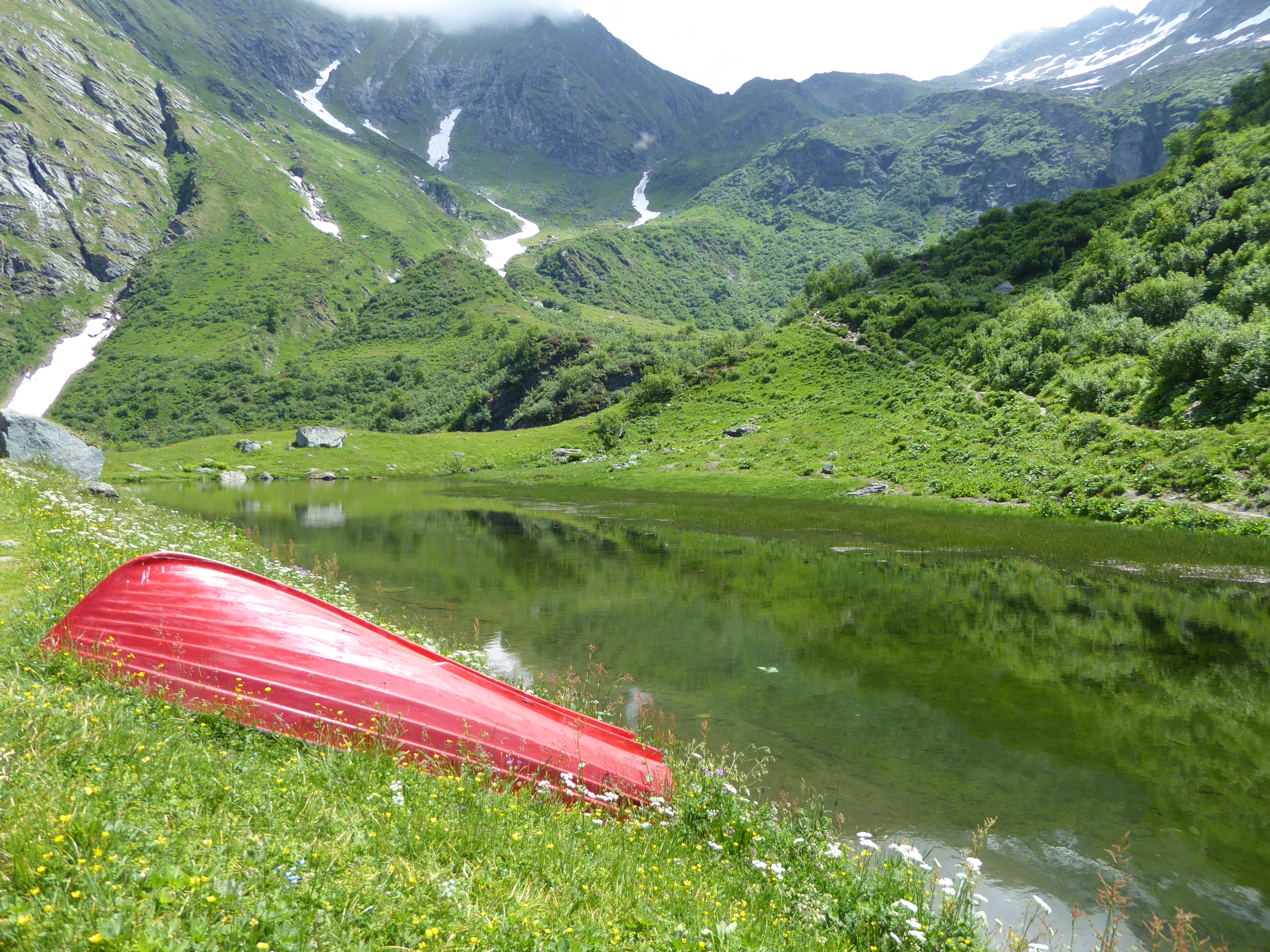
- Interactive map of Parco naturale Alta Valsesia
- Location: Piedmont
- Nearest city: Alagna Valsesia
- Area: 6511 hectares
- Established: 1979
- Governing body: Ente di Gestione delle Aree Protette dell'Ossola

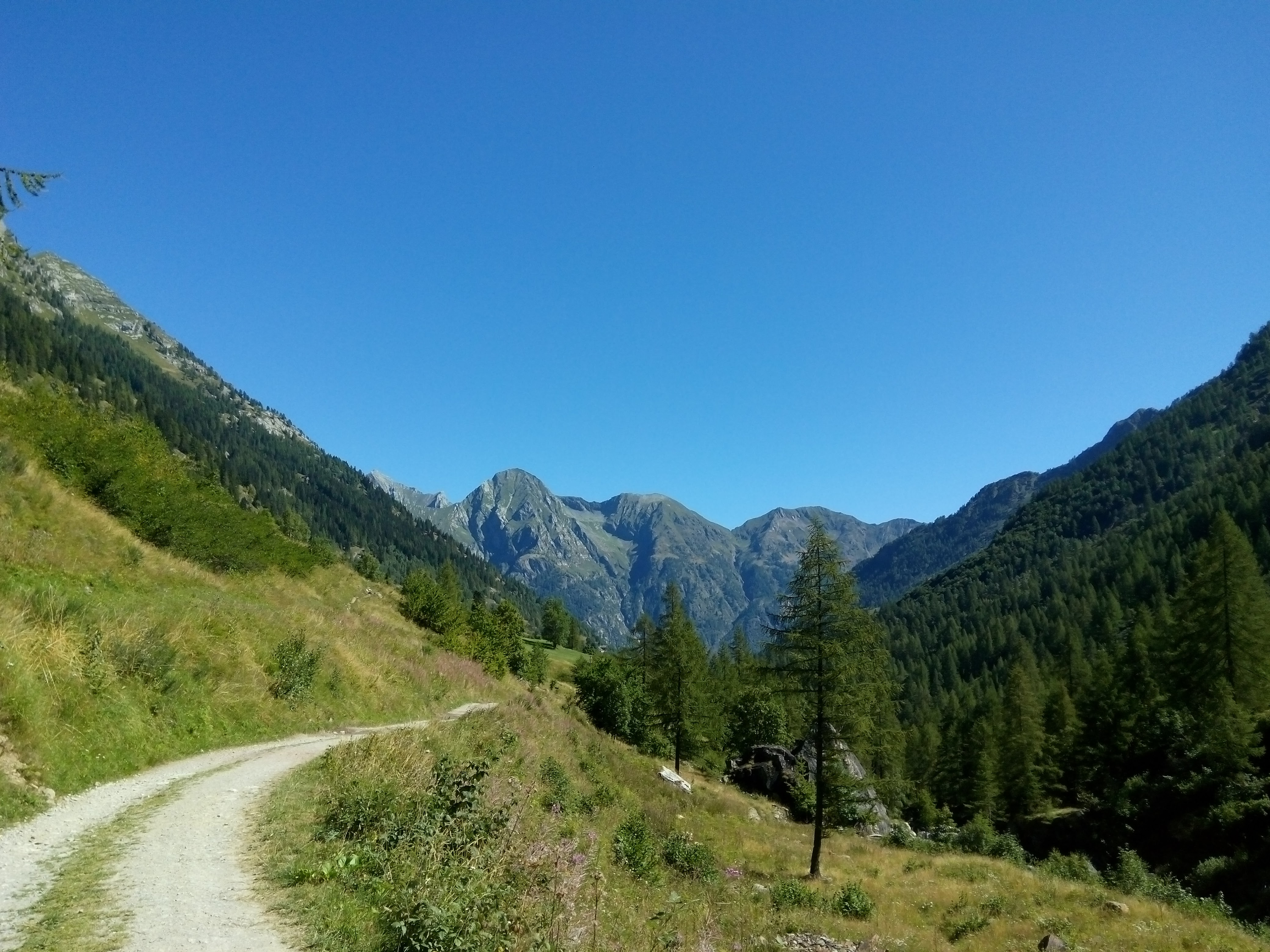

The Alta Valsesia Natural Park is a nature reserve\regional park in Piedmont, in Italy.

It is an Alpine park considered the highest in Europe. It includes Signalkuppe (on the Italian side), Monte Rosa, Val Vogna, and the Sesia River.
