= Carlo Bernardini (politician) =

Italian physicist and politician (1930–2018)

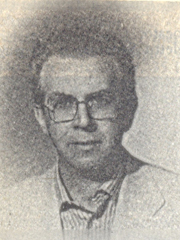
Carlo Bernardini

Carlo Bernardini (22 April 1930 – 21 June 2018) was an Italian physicist and politician who served as a Senator from 1976 to 1979.
