= Parco naturale della Valle del Ticino =

Nature reserve in Piedmont, Italy

Coordinates: 45°33′30″N 8°41′20″E

- IUCN category V (protected landscape/seascape)
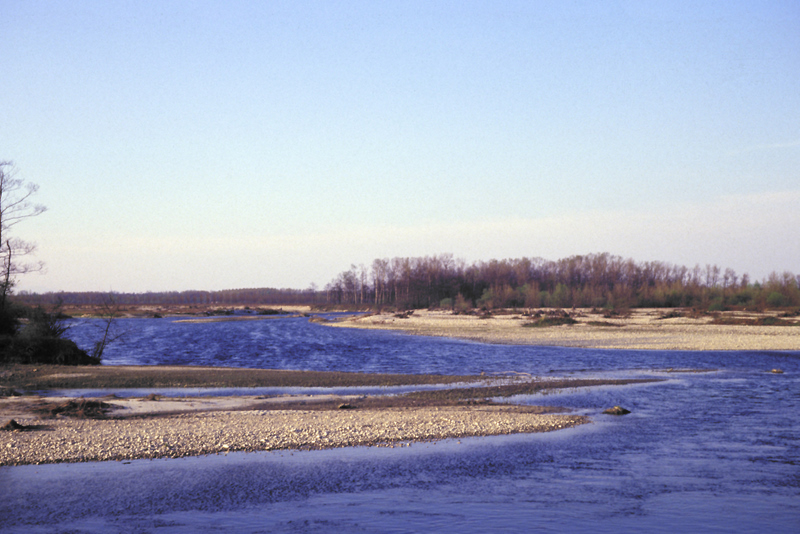
- Interactive map of Parco naturale della Valle del Ticino
- Location: Piedmont
- Nearest city: Pavia
- Area: 6,561 hectares (16,210 acres)
- Established: 1978
- Governing body: Ente di Gestione delle Aree Protette dell'Ossola

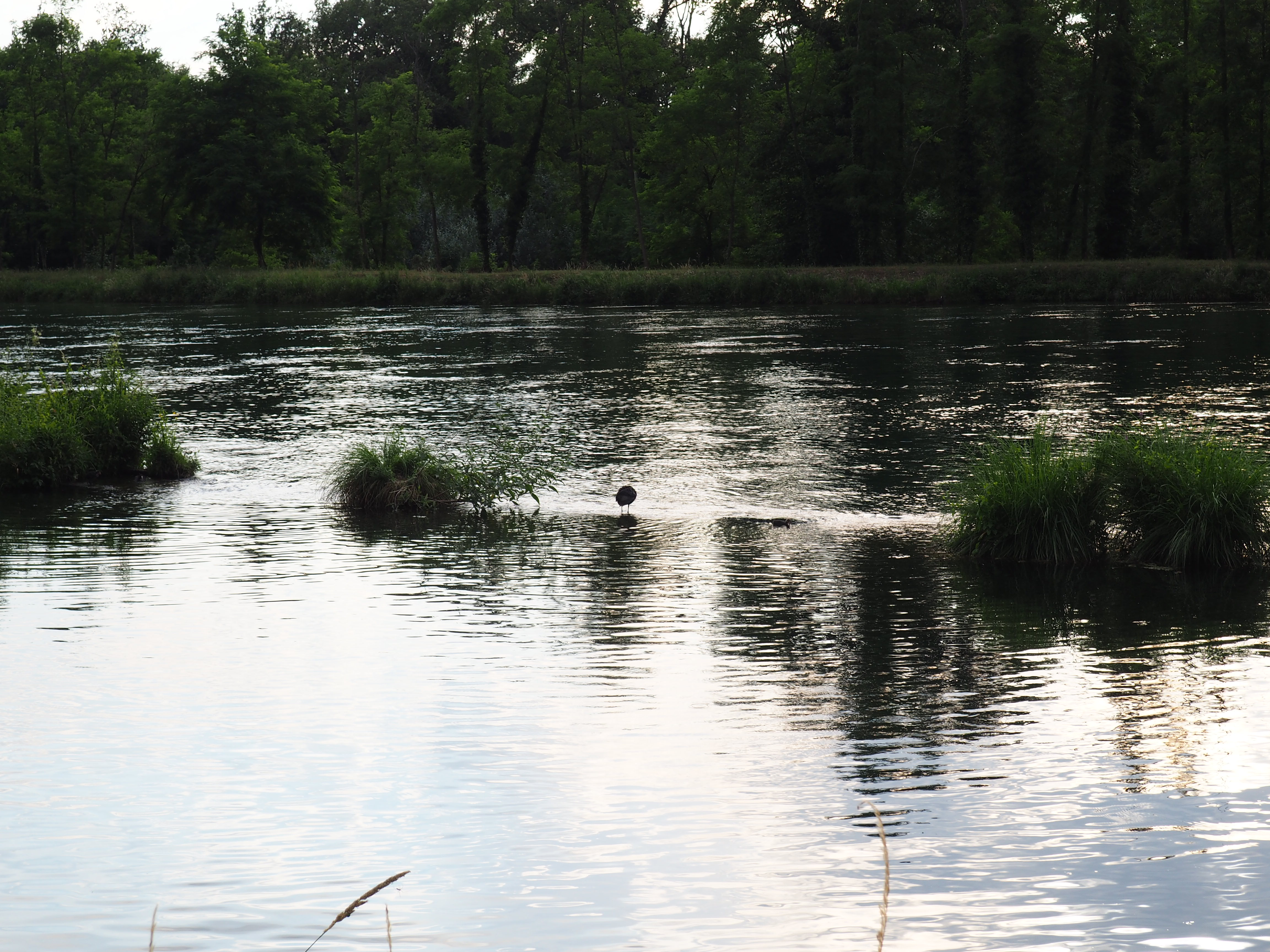

The Ticino Valley Natural Park is a nature reserve\regional park in Piedmont, Italy.

It is an riverine park that forms a greenway outside of Milan, near Pavia and Varese. It is located along the Ticino. Inhabiting the park are foxes, badgers, weasels, skunks, and martens, along with reintroduced European otters and roe deer. It is a notable fishing and birdwatching locale. Located in the park are Bernate Ticino and Morimondo Abbey.
