= Northern Grigna Regional Park =

Italian nature reserve

Parco regionale della Grigna settentrionale
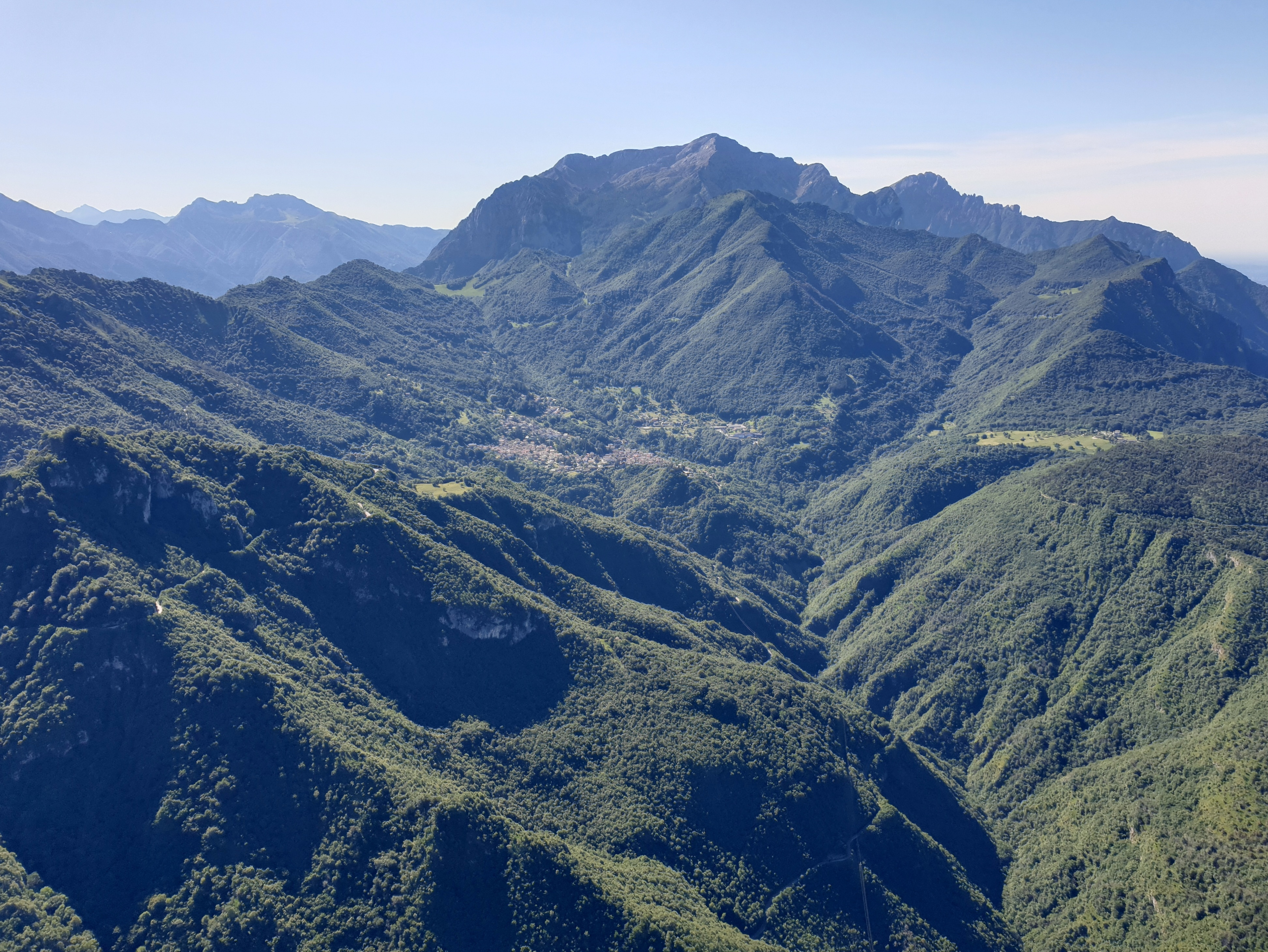
- Interactive map of Parco regionale della Grigna settentrionale
- Location: Lombardy, Italy
- Coordinates: 45°59′N 9°22′E
- Area: 5,541 ha (13,690 acres)
- Established: 2005
- Website: www.parcogrigna.it

The Northern Grigna Regional Park (Italian: Parco regionale della Grigna settentrionale) is a nature reserve in Lombardy, Italy. Established in 2005, it encompasses most of the Grigna massif, located in the province of Lecco, in the Bergamasque Alps).

The park has an area of 5,541 hectares in the territory of eight municipalities, between Lake Como, the Val d'Esino and the Valsassina, the highest point being the peak of the Grigna settentrionale (Northern Grigna) or Grignone, 2,409 meters above sea level, while the lowest point is 500 meters above sea level. The proximity to Lake Como creates a varied environment; the side closer to the lake enjoys a relatively mild climate, whereas the one closer to the Valsassina has a more typical alpine climate.

The park's fauna includes the marmot, the chamois, the red deer, the roe deer, the least weasel, the beech marten, the European badger, the red fox and the red squirrel. Nearly a hundred species of birds live in the park, including the peregrine falcon, the golden eagle, the Eurasian eagle-owl, the black kite, the European honey buzzard, the corn crake, the black woodpecker, the hen harrier, the black grouse, the boreal owl, the rock partridge and the grey partridge. Reptiles include the vipera aspis, the Italian crested newt and the podarcis muralis.

The Releccio cave complex, the second deepest cave in Italy with a depth of 1,313 meters, is located in the park.
