= Monviso Natural Park =

Nature reserve in Piedmont, Italy

Parco naturale del Monviso
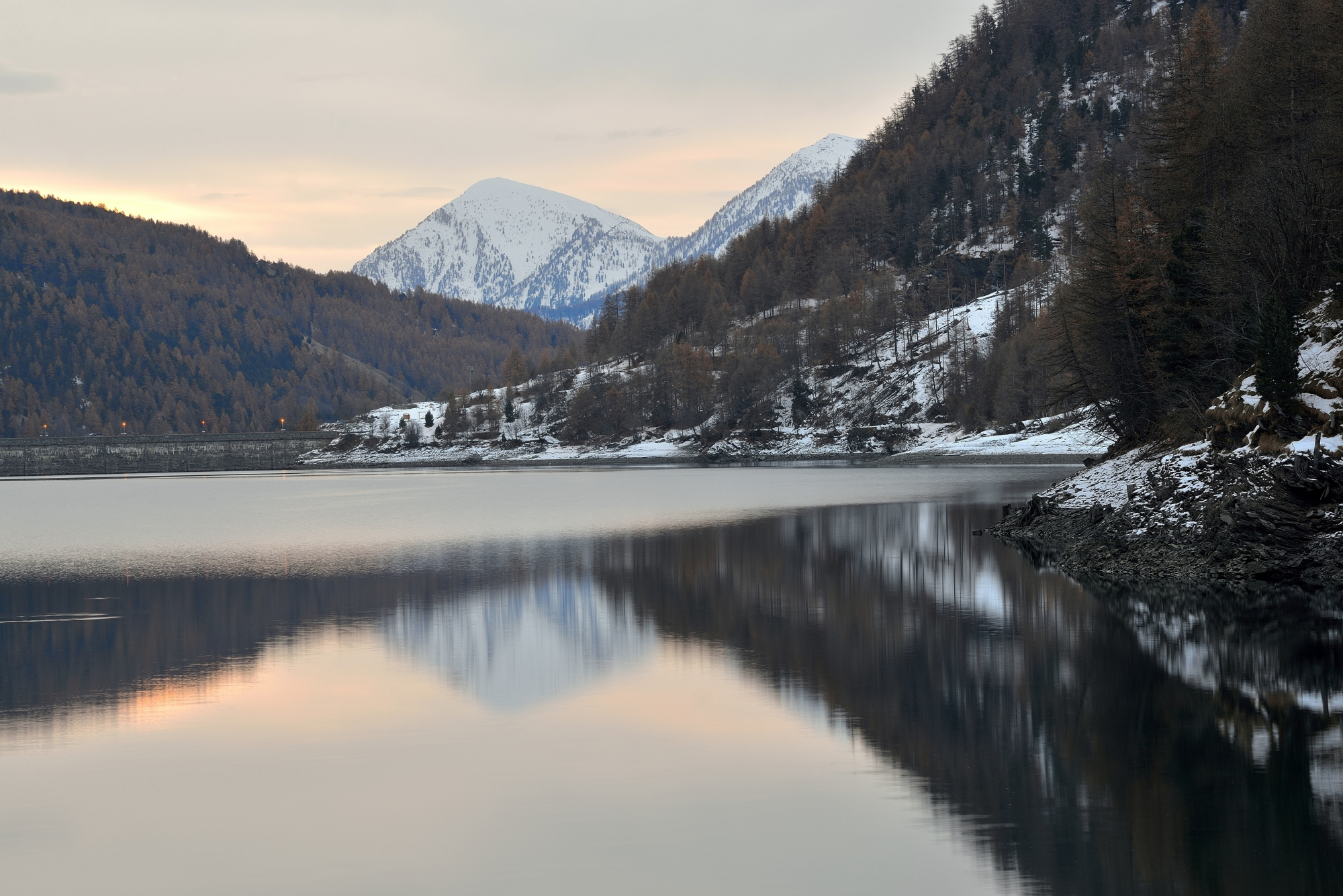
- Interactive map of Parco naturale del Monviso
- Location: Piedmont, Italy
- Coordinates: 44°39′56″N 7°06′35″E
- Area: 10,112 ha (24,990 acres)
- Established: 2016
- Website: www.parcomonviso.eu

The Monviso Natural Park (Italian: Parco naturale del Monviso) is a nature reserve in Piedmont, Italy. Established in 2016 and enlarged in 2019, it encompasses the Monviso, the highest mountain in the Cottian Alps, and the surrounding area between the Valle Po and the Valle Varaita, part of the UNESCO biosphere reserve of Monviso. The lowest point is in the plain of Cuneo, 240 meters above sea level, whereas the highest point is the peak of the Monviso, 3,841 meters above sea level.

The source of the Po river, the Pian del Re, is located inside the park. The park includes the Alevé woods, the largest stone pine forest in the Alps (825 acres). The flora includes pedunculate oaks, hornbeams, white willows and silver poplars at lower elevations, replaced by willowherbs and beeches and then by larches and stone pines at higher elevations; above the tree line there are grasslands and then scree.

The fauna is varied and includes the alpine ibexes, chamoises, red deer, roe deer, wild boars, marmots, red squirrels, dormouses, foxes, wolves, voles, stoats, shrews, badgers, beech martens, weasels, golden eagles, rock ptarmigans, alpine choughs, red-billed choughs, snowfinches, wallcreepers, alpine accentors, whinchats, water pipits, northern wheatear, and red-backed shrikes. Overall, 54 species of mammals, 222 species of birds, eleven species of reptiles, eleven species of amphibians, 32 species of fish, 50 species of mollusks and 772 species of insects are recorded as living in the park.
