= Stelvio National Park =

Protected area in Italy

Parco Nazionale dello Stelvio Nationalpark Stilfserjoch
- IUCN category II (national park)
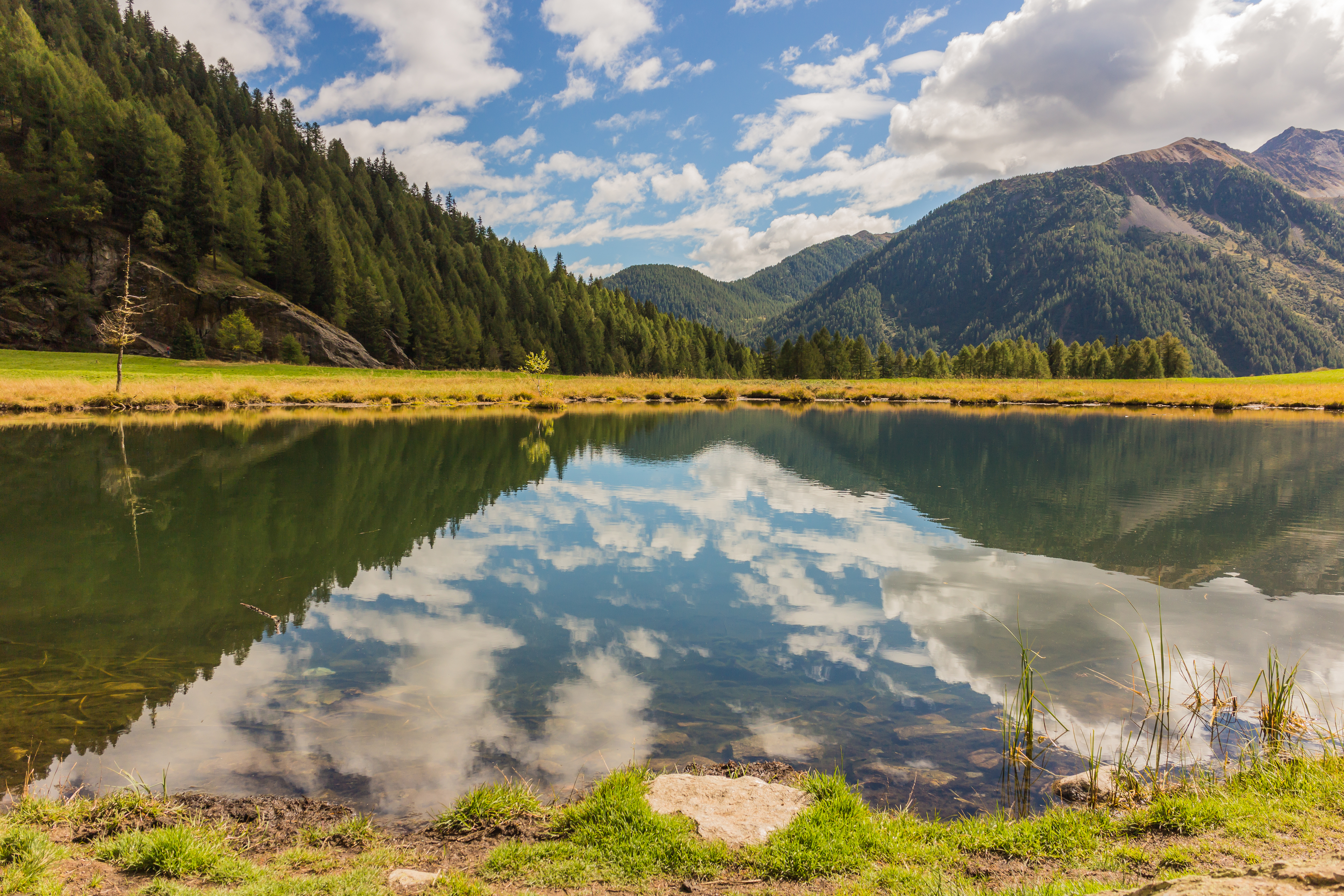
- View of the park

- Location within Italy
- Location: Lombardia, Trentino-Alto Adige/Südtirol
- Nearest city: Trento
- Coordinates: 46°30′N 10°35′E
- Elevation: 690 m (2,260 ft) to 3,905 m (12,812 ft)
- Established: 1935
- Governing body: Ministero dell'Ambiente
- Website: www.parks.it/parco.nazionale.stelvio/Eindex.php

Stelvio National Park (Italian: Parco nazionale dello Stelvio; German: Nationalpark Stilfser Joch) is a national park in northeast Italy, established in 1935.

The park is the fourth largest in Italy and covers part of two regions: Trentino-Alto Adige/Südtirol and Lombardia, in 24 municipalities.

Stelvio National Park has borders with the Swiss National Park, Adamello Brenta Natural Park, and Adamello Regional Park (Italian: Parco regionale dell'Adamello). Together, these parks comprise 400,000 hectares (1,500 sq mi) of protected natural environment. The park includes an extensive territory of valleys and high mountains, ranging from 650 metres (2,130 ft) to 3,905 m (12,812 ft) in height.

In December 2025 a wildlife photographer discovered around 20000 footprints of dinosaurs dating back about 210 millions year in the park, near the Swiss border. It is one of the largest Triassic trace fossil sites found. The fossil trackway shows movement of long-necked, bipedal herbivores preserved on high Alpine cliffs and celebrated as a significant paleontological find.
