= Lakes of Avigliana Natural Park =

Nature reserve in Piedmont, Italy

- Parco naturale dei laghi di Avigliana
- IUCN category IV (habitat/species management area)
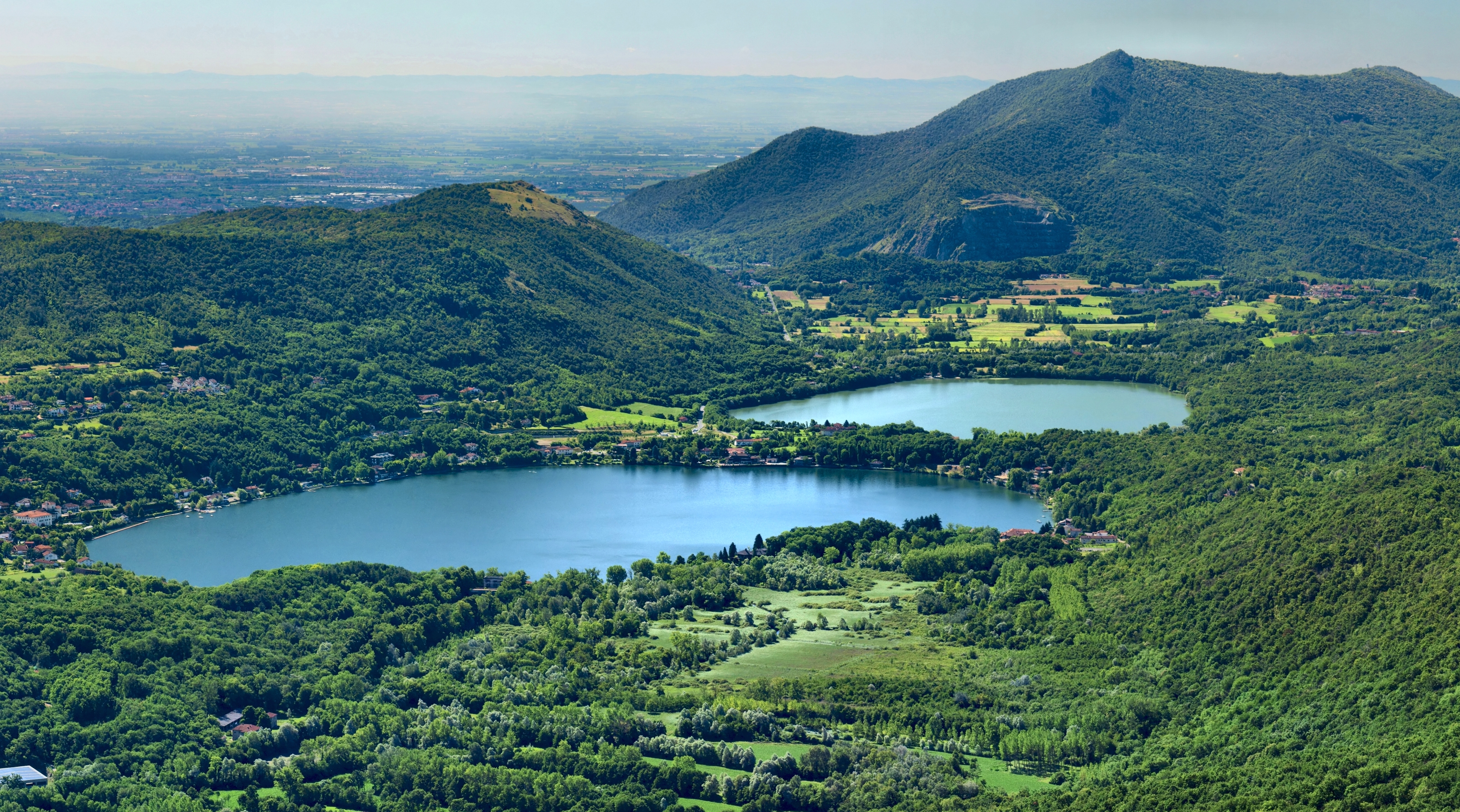

- Location within Italy
- Location: Piedmont, Italy
- Nearest city: Turin
- Coordinates: 45.0695°N 7.3810°E
- Area: 409 ha (1,010 acres)
- Established: 1980
- Website: www.parchialpicozie.it

The Lakes of Avigliana Natural Park (Italian: Parco naturale dei laghi di Avigliana) is a nature reserve in Piedmont, Italy. Established in 1980, it covers the area surrounding the eponymous maar lakes and the Mareschi swamp (the westernmost swamp in Italy), in the lower Val Susa, between Monte Pirchiriano and the hill of Rivoli.

Since 2009 the park, located entirely in the territory of Avigliana in the Province of Turin, has been managed by the Ente di gestione delle aree protette delle Alpi Cozie, along with the Val Troncea, Orsiera-Rocciavrè and Gran Bosco di Salbertrand natural parks and the natural reserves of the gorges of Foresto and Chianocco.

The park's fauna includes herons, coots, ducks, common moorhens, great crested grebes, little grebes, black kites, Eurasian bitterns, Eurasian treecreepers, lesser spotted woodpeckers, brown frogs, great cormorants, and pheasants; the fish in the lakes include Eurasian carps, Northern pikes, European perches, Largemouth basses, and Italian chubs.
