= Orsiera-Rocciavrè Natural Park =

Nature reserve in Piedmont, Italy

- Parco naturale Orsiera-Rocciavrè
- IUCN category V (protected landscape/seascape)
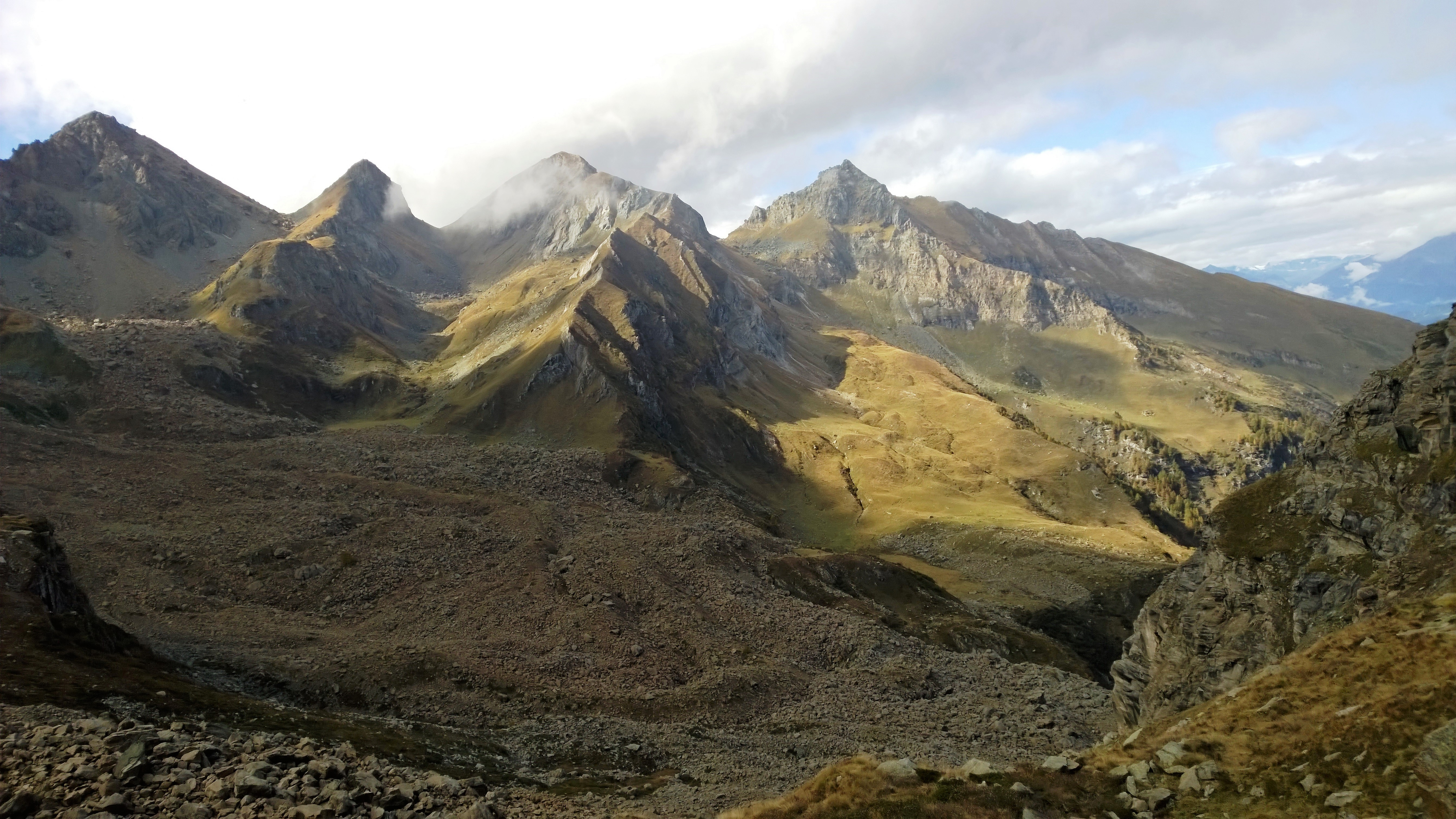
- View from Colle delle Vallette

- Location within Italy
- Location: Piedmont, Italy
- Nearest city: Turin
- Coordinates: 45.0649°N 7.1353°E
- Area: 10,928 ha (42.19 sq mi)
- Elevation: 2,890 m (9,480 ft)
- Established: 1980
- Website: www.parchialpicozie.it

The Orsiera-Rocciavrè Natural Park (Italian: Parco naturale Orsiera-Rocciavrè) is a nature reserve in Piedmont, Italy. Established in 1980, it covers a vast Alpine area between the Val Susa and the Val Chisone, in the Graian Alps and the Cottian Alps. The Site of Community Importance of Orsiera-Rocciavrè is part of the park, whose highest point is the peak of Monte Orsiera, 2,890 metres above sea level. The Colle delle Finestre, the Fenestrelle Fort and the Montebenedetto Charterhouse are also located inside the park.

Since 2009 the park, which covers partially or entirely the territory of eleven municipalities of the Province of Turin, has been managed by the Ente di gestione delle aree protette delle Alpi Cozie, along with the Val Troncea, Lakes of Avigliana and Gran Bosco di Salbertrand natural parks and the natural reserves of the gorges of Foresto and Chianocco.

The park's flora includes Scots pine, larch, beech, and alder. The fauna includes chamois, alpine ibexes, marmots, mouflons, red deer, wolves, foxes, European badgers, black grouse, Eurasian sparrowhawks, and golden eagles.

Five mountain huts are located within the park. They are linked by the Giro dell'Orsiera (Tour of the Orsiera), a 55-km GR footpath around Monte Orsiera.
