= Matese National Park =

National park in Italy

- Location within Italy
- Location: Campania and Molise, Italy
- Coordinates: 41.3814°N 14.4069°E
- Area: 87,897.7 ha (217,200 acres)
- Website: Official website

The Matese National Park is a protected national park in Italy covering 52 municipalities and 87,897.7 hectares. It is the 25th national park established in the country. It was established in 2024 by the Italian Minister of the Environment and Energy Security, Gilberto Pichetto Fratin. The park contains limestone peaks and the Matese lake.
