= Cartigliano =

- Comune
- Comune di Cartigliano
- Coat of arms

- Location within Italy Location within Veneto
- Coordinates: 45°43′N 11°42′E
- Country: Italy
- Region: Veneto
- Province: Vicenza (VI)

Government
  - Mayor: Guido Grego

Area
  - Total: 7.38 km^{2} (2.85 sq mi)
- Elevation: 86 m (282 ft)

Population (31 May 2017)
  - Total: 3,802
  - Density: 515/km^{2} (1,330/sq mi)
- Demonym: Cartiglianesi
- Time zone: UTC+1 (CET)
  - Summer (DST): UTC+2 (CEST)
- Postal code: 36050
- Dialing code: 0424
- Patron saint: Oswald of Northumbria
- Saint day: 5 August
- Website: Official website

Cartigliano is a small town and comune in the province of Vicenza, Veneto, north-eastern Italy. It is located northeast of Vicenza, near the river Brenta.

== Twin towns ==
- Kimle, Hungary
