= Adamello-Presanella Alps =

Mountain range in northern Italy

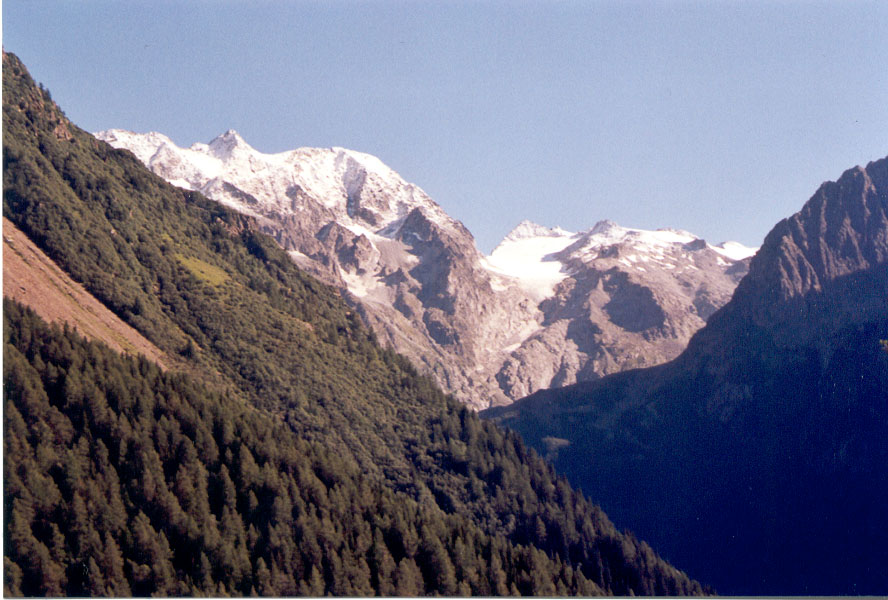
- Adamello-Presanella Alps seen from the Tonale Pass road.

Highest point
- Peak: Cima Presanella
- Elevation: 3,558 m (11,673 ft)
- Coordinates: 46°13′10″N 10°39′51″E

Geography
- Country: Italy
- Range coordinates: 46°11.7′N 10°37.5′E
- Parent range: Southern Limestone Alps (Eastern Alps)

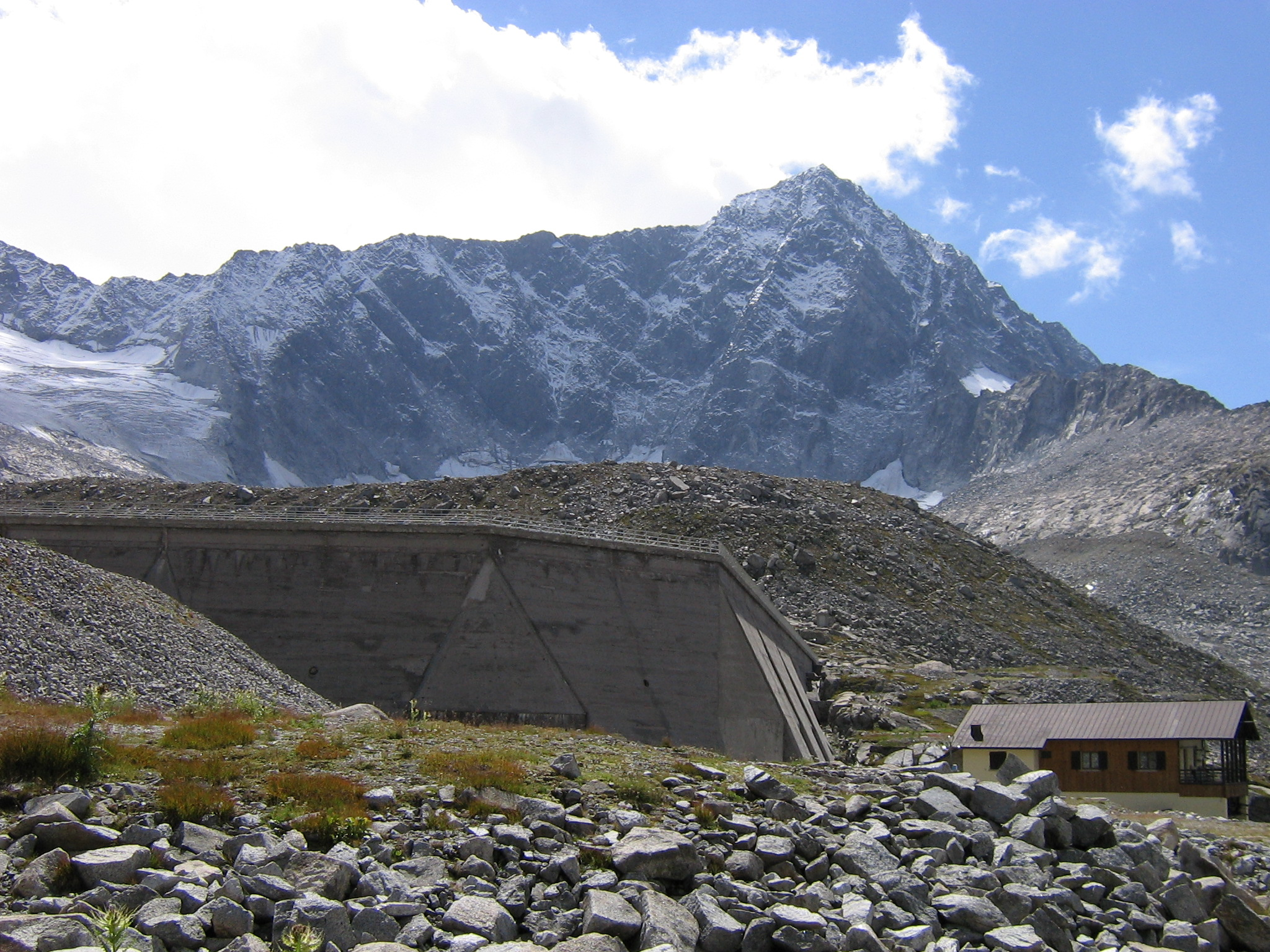
Mount Adamello's North face with Venerocolo dam in the foreground

The Adamello-Presanella Alps Alpine group is a mountain range in the Southern Limestone Alps mountain group of the Eastern Alps. It is located in northern Italy, in the provinces of Trentino and Brescia. The name stems from its highest peaks: Adamello and Presanella.

The Adamello-Presanella Group is separated from the Ortler Alps in the north by the Tonale Pass; from the Bergamo Alps in the west by the Oglio valley (Val Camonica); from the Brenta Group in the east by the Campo Carlo Magno Pass and the river Sarca; to the south it continues towards Lake Iseo.

== Peaks ==
The main peaks of the Adamello-Presanella Group are:

Peak	Elevation (m/ft)	
Presanella	3558	11,694
Adamello	3554	11,661
Carè Alto	3465	11,369
Dosson di Genova	3430	11,254
Crozzon di Lares	3354	11,004
Corno Baitone	3331	10,929
Busazza	3329	10,922
Lobbia Alta	3196	10,486
Monte Tredenus	2796	9,173
Monte Frerone	2673	8,770

== Passes ==
The main mountain passes of the Adamello-Presanella Group are:

Pass	Location	Type	Elevation (m/ft)	
Passo di Lares	Lares Glacier to the Lobbia Glacier	snow	3195	10,483
Passo di Cercen	Val di Genova to Fucine	snow	3043	9984
Passo della Lobbia Alta	Lobbia Glacier to the Mandron Glacier	snow	3036	9961
Passo di Presena	Val di Genova to the Tonale Pass	snow	3011	9879
Pisgana Pass	Val di Genova to Ponte di Legno	snow	2934	9626
Passo della Forcellina or di Campo	Cedegolo to the Val di Fumo	footpath	2288	7507
Croce Domini Pass	Breno to Bagolino	road	1895	6217
Tonale Pass	Cles to Edolo	road	1884	6181
Colle Maniva	Val Trompia to Bagolino	road	1669	5476
Campo Carlo Magno	Dimaro to Pinzolo	road	1648	5407

== See also ==
- Southern Limestone Alps
- Geography of the Alps
- Lake Baitone
