= Mount Adamello =

Mountain in Italy

Adamello
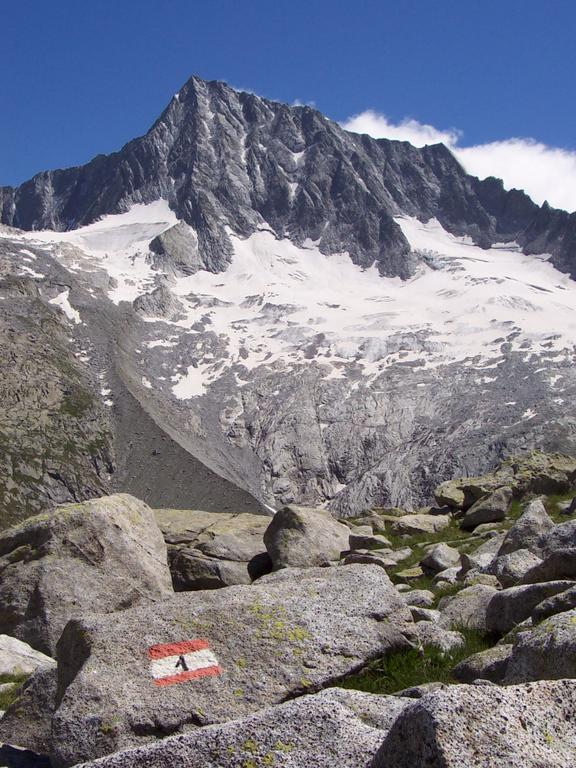

Highest point
- Elevation: 3,539 m (11,611 ft)
- Prominence: 664 m (2,178 ft)
- Listing: Alpine mountains above 3000 m
- Coordinates: 46°09′22″N 10°29′47″E

Geography
- Location within Alps
- Location: Lombardy, Italy
- Parent range: Adamello-Presanella

Climbing
- First ascent: Julius von Payer, Girolamo Botteri, 16 September 1864
- Easiest route: crossing Pian di Neve

Adamello (in local dialect Adamèl) is a mountain in Lombardy, Italy. With an elevation of 3,539 metres (11,611 ft), it is the second highest peak of the Adamello-Presanella Alps. It is located in Valcamonica, Lombardy (Province of Brescia). Its glacier, measured over 1600 hectares, is the biggest glacier fully comprised in Italian territory.

== Description ==
Douglas Freshfield gives this description from the summit of the Presanella, which he ascended for the first time (September 17, 1864):

The central mass of Adamello ... is a huge block, large enough to supply materials for half-a-dozen fine mountains. But it is in fact only one. For a length and breadth of many miles the ground never falls below 9,500 feet. The vast central snow-field feeds glaciers pouring to every point in the compass. The highest peaks, such as Carè Alto and Adamello, are merely slight elevations of the rim of this uplifted plain. Seen from within they are mere hummocks; from without they are very noble mountains falling in great precipices towards the wild glacier-closed glens which run up to their feet.
Douglas William Freshfield, 1875.

== First ascent ==
The summit of Adamello was conquered for the first time by a young Bohemian climber, Julius von Payer, along with a mountain guide from Val Rendena, Girolamo Botteri, on 16 September 1864. The next day, the two climbers conquered the neighboring Presanella (3558 m above sea level), but were disappointed to find that a team assembled by Douglas Freshfield had preceded them by three weeks.

The team that supported Payer and Botteri was composed, in addition to them, by another mountain guide, Giovanni Caturani and a local porter, Antonio Bertoldi. Some sources state that Caturani, not Botteri, went with Payer to the top. The expedition took off on September 8 and mistakenly climbed two secondary peaks of the Adamello massif, the Dosson di Genova, 3419 m, and the Corno Bianco (White Horn), 3434 m, before facing the true summit.

The same route chosen by Payer, and Caturani is considered today as one of the easiest (although since then a lot has changed in the shape of glaciers), starting from the Val Genova, on the Trentino side, and crossing Pian di Neve (Snow Plain) to the peaks.

The first repetition, always in summer, was completed, following a similar path, by a British party, including the Londoner Douglas Freshfield and the famous Francis Fox Tuckett, with François Devouassoud, another Swiss guide, and a porter. Although they also ran the risk of making mistakes in the choice of the way, they arrived at the summit on July 3 1865, claiming to have been faster than Payer in first ascent the year before.

== World War I ==
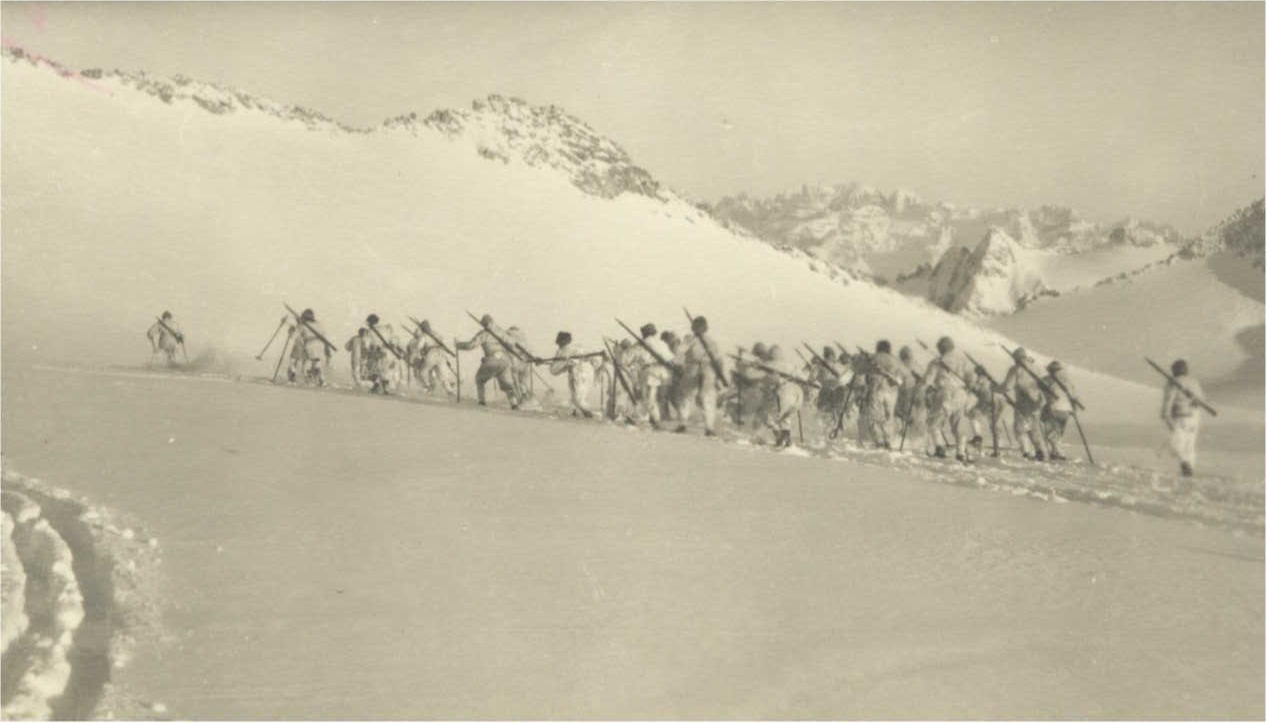
Italian ski patrol on the Adamello during World War I

During World War I the front between Austrian and Italian troops ran through the Adamello massif and both sides manned position on the summits all year round.

== Climbing routes ==
To climb the summit of Adamello's main peak, there is not really a single Normal route (Via Normale in Italian). It is a short climb from the Pian di Neve to the summit, but the route to reach and cross the Pian di Neve depends on the valley chosen as the starting point.

The first climbers started from the Val Genova and went up the Mandrone glacier. This is still one of the most frequently used routes to the summit from the Trentino side. It requires glacier travel equipment because of the risk of crevasses, but is otherwise a long walk that is technically easy.

== Panorama ==
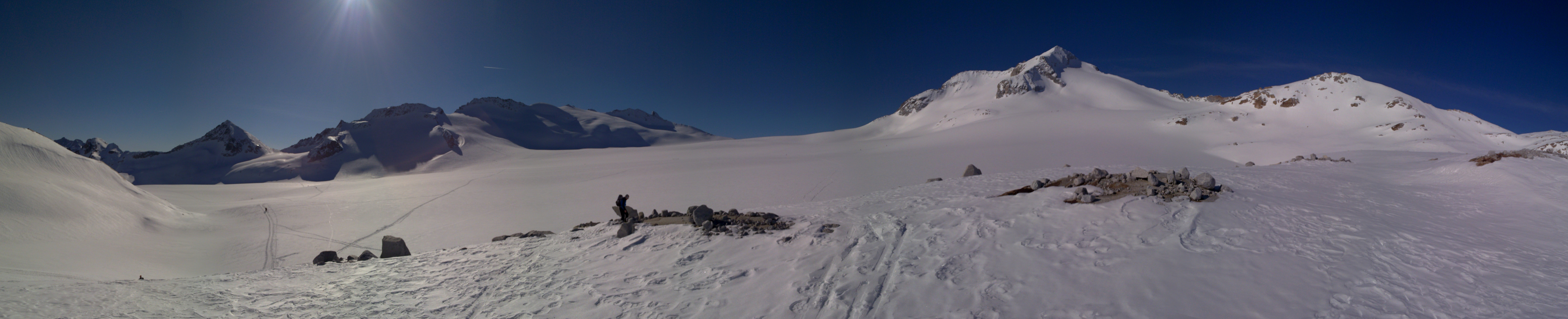
Panorama from Pian di Neve
