= Cima Busazza =

Mountain in Italy

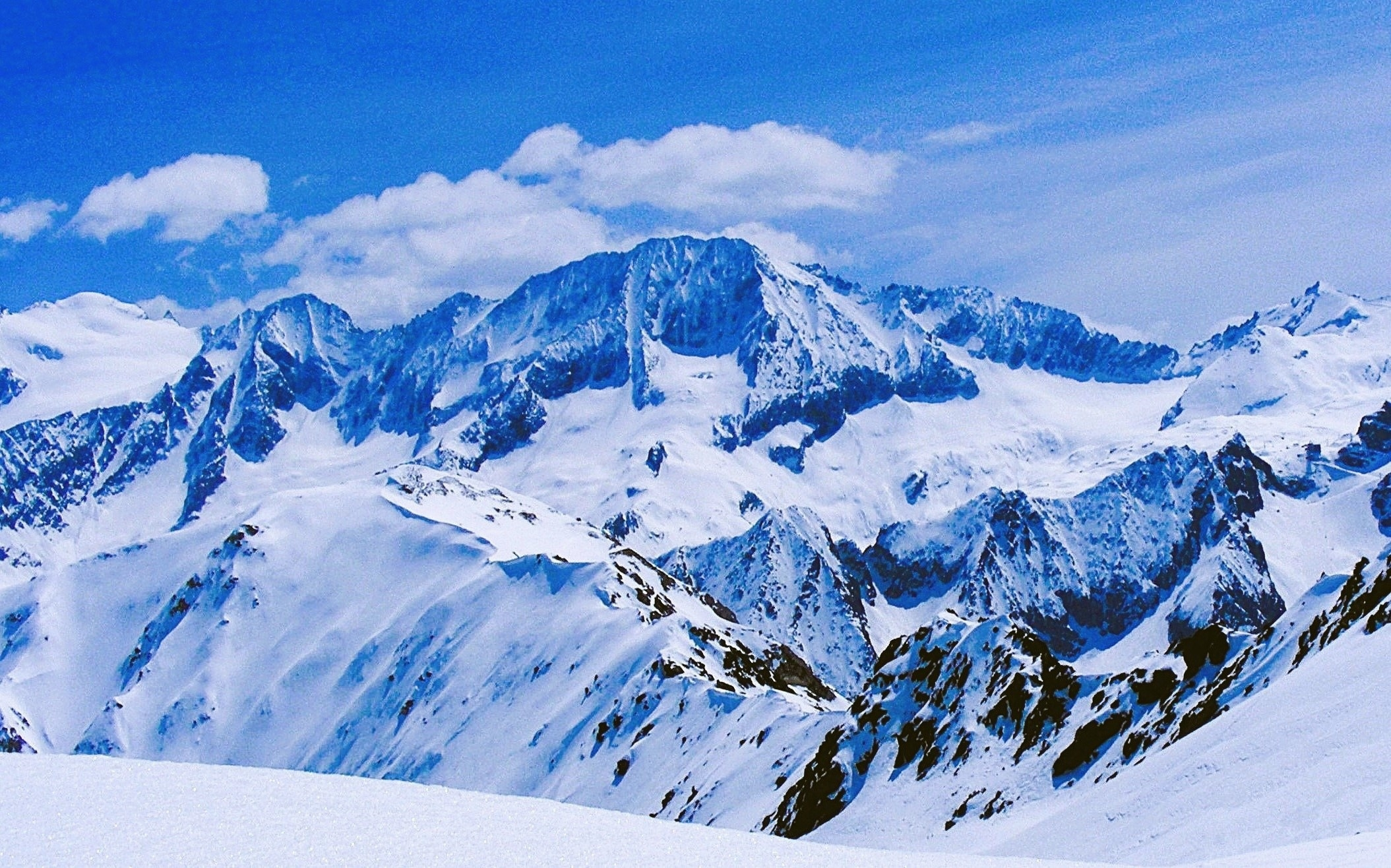
- North aspect

Highest point
- Elevation: 3,326 m (10,912 ft)
- Prominence: 320 m (1,050 ft)
- Parent peak: Presanella
- Isolation: 3.22 km (2.00 mi)
- Coordinates: 46°13′26″N 10°36′39″E

Geography
- Location within Italy
- Interactive map of Cima Busazza
- Country: Italy
- Province: Trentino
- Protected area: Adamello Brenta Natural Park
- Parent range: Alps; Adamello-Presanella Alps
- Topo map(s): Tabacco 015 Dolomiti di Zoldo, Cadorine e Agordine

Climbing
- First ascent: 1889

Cima Busazza is a mountain in the province of Trentino in northern Italy.

== Description ==
Cima Busazza is a 3,326-meter-elevation (10,912-foot) summit in the Adamello-Presanella Alps. Set in the Trentino-Alto Adige/Südtirol region, the peak is located four kilometers (2.5 miles) southeast of the municipality of Ponte di Legno, and situated in Adamello Brenta Natural Park. Precipitation runoff from the mountain's south slope drains into the Sarca, whereas the north slope drains into tributaries of the Adige. Topographic relief is significant as the summit rises 1,750 meters (5,741 feet) above Sarca di Genova in 2.5 kilometers (1.55 miles), and 1,825 meters (5,988 feet) above the Vermigliana Valley in four kilometers (2.5 miles). The nearest higher neighbor is Monte Gabbiolo, 3.22 kilometers (2 miles) to the east. The first ascent of Busazza was made on August 1, 1889, by Adolf Gstirner, Karl Schultz, and guide Ognibene Bonapace via the southeast slope and east ridge.

== Climate ==
Based on the Köppen climate classification, Cima Busazza is located in an alpine climate zone with long, cold winters, and short, mild summers. Weather systems are forced upwards by the mountains (orographic lift), causing moisture to drop in the form of rain and snow. This climate supports the Vedretta della Busazza (glacierets) on the north slope of the peak. The months of June through September offer the most favorable weather for visiting or climbing in this area.

== Gallery ==
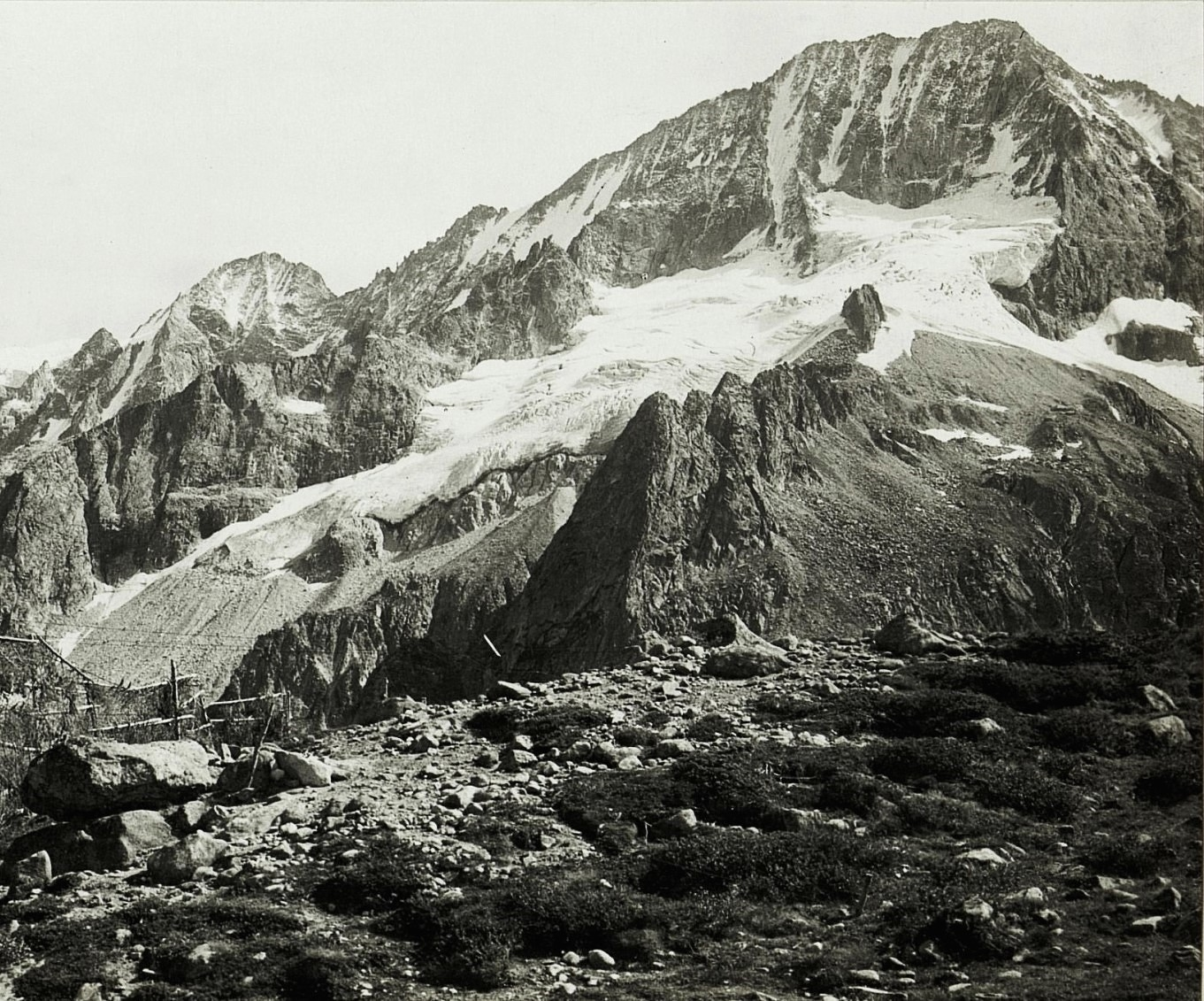
Busazza in 1917 (northwest aspect)

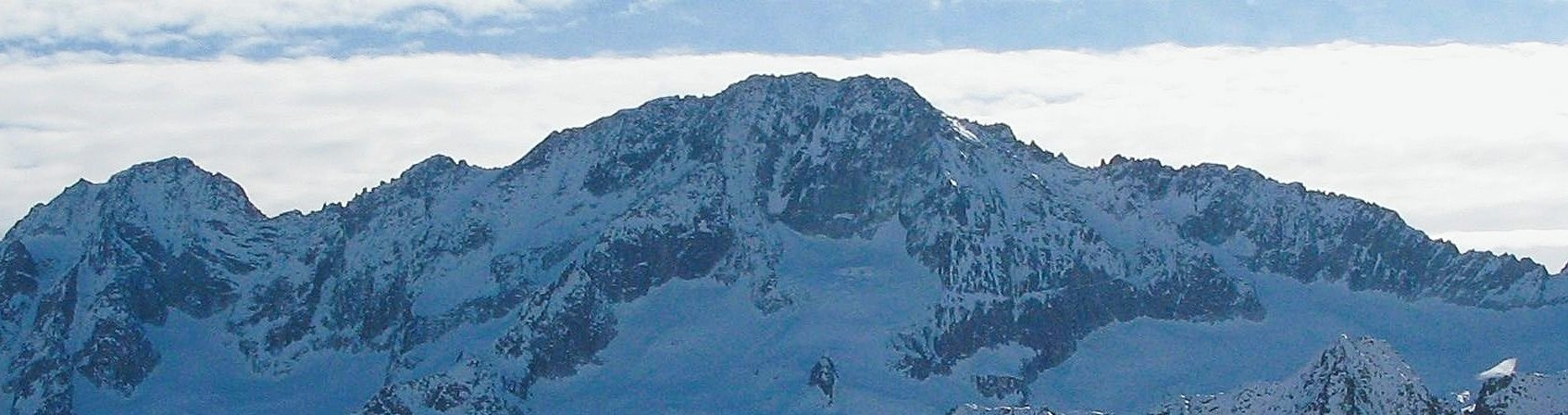
North aspect

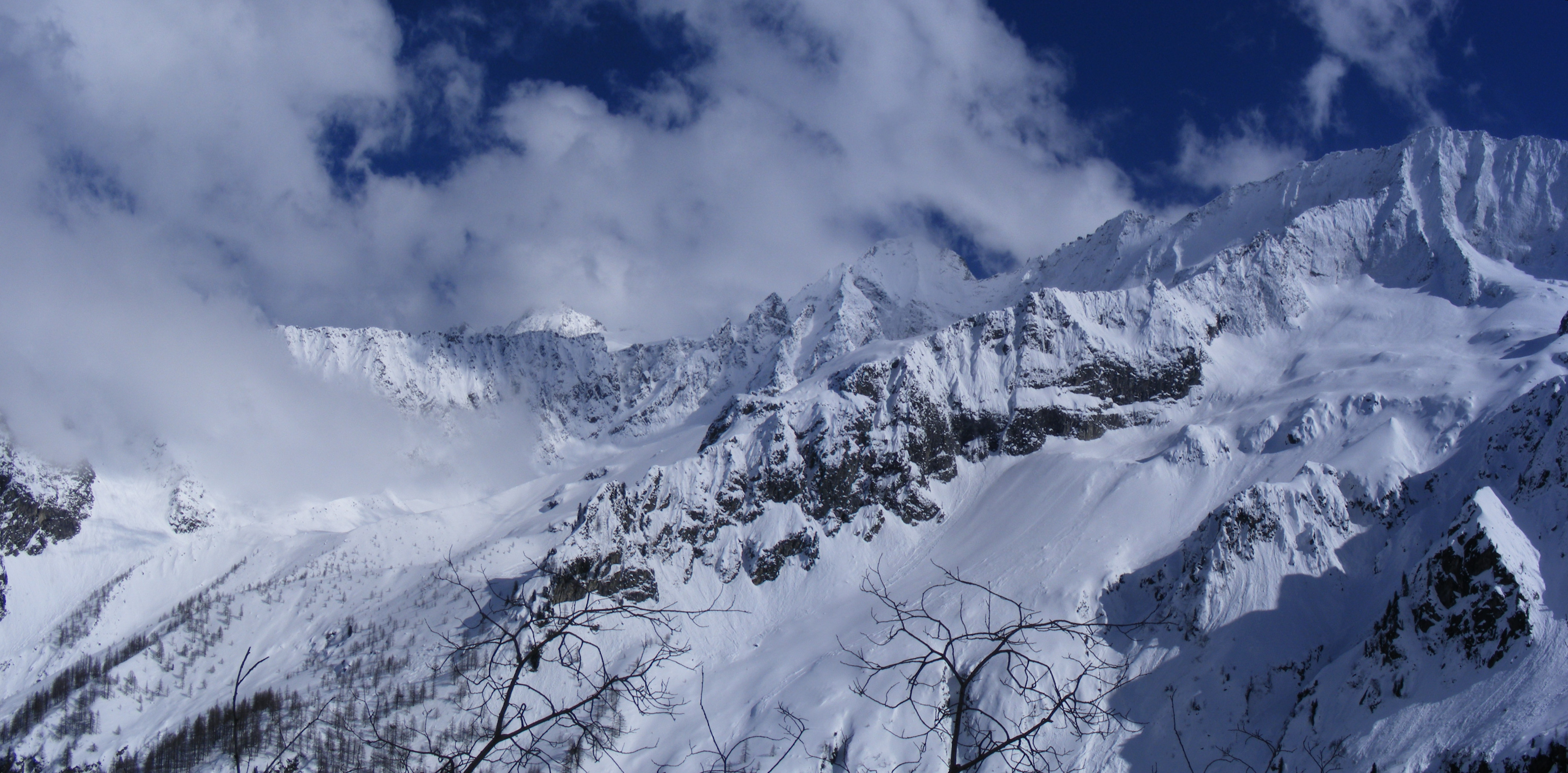
Busazza in upper right

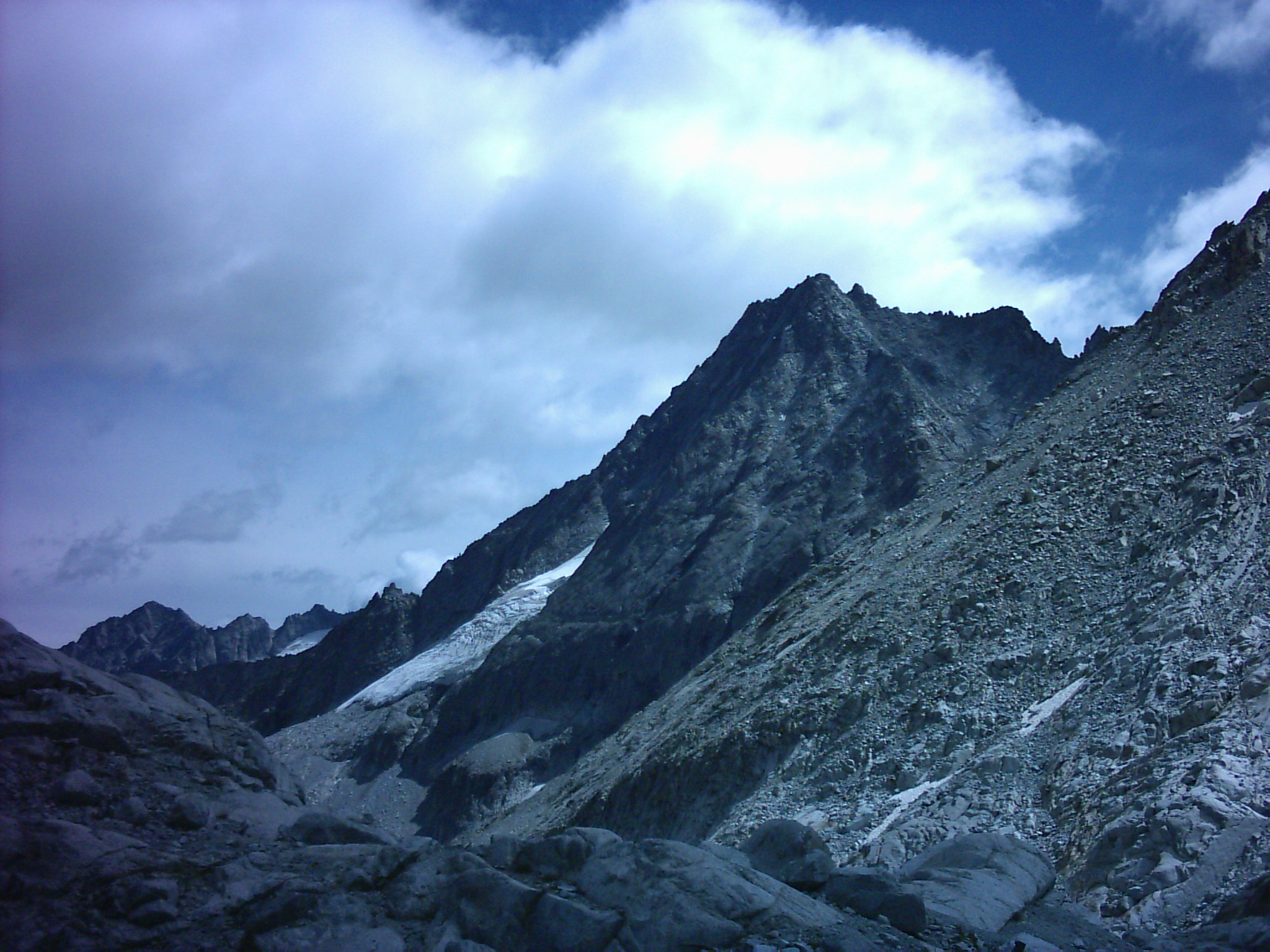
West aspect
