= Forte Corno D'Aola =

Italian fortification in Veneto

Coordinates: 46°15′10″N 10°33′49″E

What remains of Fort Corno D'aola as of 2007.

Fort Corno D’Aola is an Italian fortification located near Dosso Prepazzone at an altitude of 1964 m (6500 ft) in Northern Italy. D’Aola is part of the Tonale-Mortirolo Barrier, and was thus in the second line of defense in the great chain of fortifications across the Austro-Hungarian border. The fort was armed with 6 149mm Howitzers in Armstrong revolving armored cupolas. The fort was built between 1900 and 1914.

== Construction ==
Fort Corno D’Aola was built with 3 terraces, and they were more protected than the rest of the fort, which enjoyed cover from the mountain. The walls on the front were 3-4m thick, but even that couldn't stop the 30.5 cm shells from penetrating the armor. The fort was painted green to help camouflage it from Austrian observers. D’Aola was equipped with a generator, ventilation systems, an internal heating system, and 2 water storage tanks located under the fort. These water tanks could hold 60 cubic meters of water but were only used in emergency cases. The fort was surrounded by an electrified fence to repel any assault.

To the south of the fort, an ammo magazine was built. The shells were transported from the magazine to the guns by a small-gauge railway. The only major drawback of the fort’s position was that it had a lack of good observation. This was fixed by the occupation of the Montecelli Ridge, however this was taken by the Austrians on the first day of the war. There was a backup however, this was a modest observation post on the eastern end of the fort. It was accessed by 5 steps that led to an armored observation turret. D’Aola was connected to the valley floor by a cablecar originating from the Poia Castle.

== World War I ==
At midnight on May 24, 1915, the news of war was transmitted to Corno D’Aola. On June 9, 1915, D’Aola’s guns tried to support the battalion “Morbegno” in its attack on Tonale works, but the guns couldn’t reach it, and summarily the attack was repulsed. In August 1915, D’Aola participated in artillery duels with forts Presanella and Tonale . In this same bombardment, one of Tonale’s armored domes was hit and the shell exploded in the ammunition magazine. As retaliation, The fort was shelled and hit by Austrian 30.5 cm mortars. In Oct. 1915, a 30.5 cm shell crashed cleanly through one of the armored domes and penetrated the bottom floor without exploding. Shortly before this, 3 out of the 4 guns were removed from the fort.

== Post-war ==
After the war was over, Corno D’Aola was abandoned by the Italian military. It was only ever used again in 1927, when Emilio Antonioli leased the fort for an Alpine summer camp for the workers of Marzotto wool mill.
