= Lake Baitone =

Artificial lake in Lombardy, Italy

Coordinates: 46°08′38″N 10°25′45″E

- Lago Baitone
- Interactive map of Lake Baitone
- Location: Sonico
- Type: Artificial lake
- Primary inflows: River Baitone and other streams
- Primary outflows: River Baitone
- Basin countries: Italy

Lake Baitone is an artificial lake in Italy, located at an elevation of 2,281 meters in the Baitone basin, at the foot of Corno Baitone, in the Adamello mountain group.

It is the largest of the numerous lakes found in the Baitone basin, a valley of glacial origin, a tributary of the Malga Valley, and it is also the fourth largest lake in the entire Val Camonica, surpassed in size by Lake Arno, Lake Pantano dell'Avio, and Lake Avio.

It was first named by Baron Luigi Alberto Guiscardo, a French general and cartographer, as "Lake of Sonico".

The dam containing it was built, along with part of the significant hydroelectric system connected to it, in 1930 and is still used for this purpose. Around it, several service structures were built, including the houses where the dam keeper and Enel workers lived for the maintenance and management of the plant. One of these, decommissioned for several decades, has been recovered and currently serves as an alpine hut, the Rifugio Baitone.

The dam, of the gravity type, is 230 meters long and 38 meters high, with a total volume of 46,600 cubic meters

The lake has several inflows, consisting of mountain streams descending from nearby peaks and the outflows of other lakes that dot the Baitone basin. These are seven natural lakes located at altitudes ranging from 2,400 to 2,800 meters (Lake Rotondo, Lake Bianco, Lake Premassone, Lake Verde, Lake Lungo, Lake Gelato Inferiore, Lake Gelato Superiore) of glacial origin and significantly smaller in size compared to Lake Baitone; they are in turn fed by the summer melting of snow that fell during the winter on the surrounding peaks, as there are no perennial glaciers in the lake's drainage basin.

When the dam is operational, the water exiting the lake is channeled through an underground conduit to Lake Miller (located at a lower elevation) in the Val Miller. If the dam's sluice gates are opened, for example during maintenance operations or partial emptying of the reservoir, the water exiting the lake forms the Rio Baitone, which flows into the Remulo stream.

Lake Baitone can only be reached on foot, starting from Ponte del Guat (1,585 m) where the paved road ascending the Val Malga ends, and following the trail with signage CAI number 13, which follows the path of an old military mule track. Alternatively, the lake can also be reached via the Alta Via dell'Adamello, ascending from the Rifugio Serafino Gnutti through the characteristic Passo del Gatto, where the trail is carved directly into the rock.
