= Strino works =

Austro-Hungarian fortification in Trentino, Italy

Coordinates: 46°16′47″N 10°38′35″E

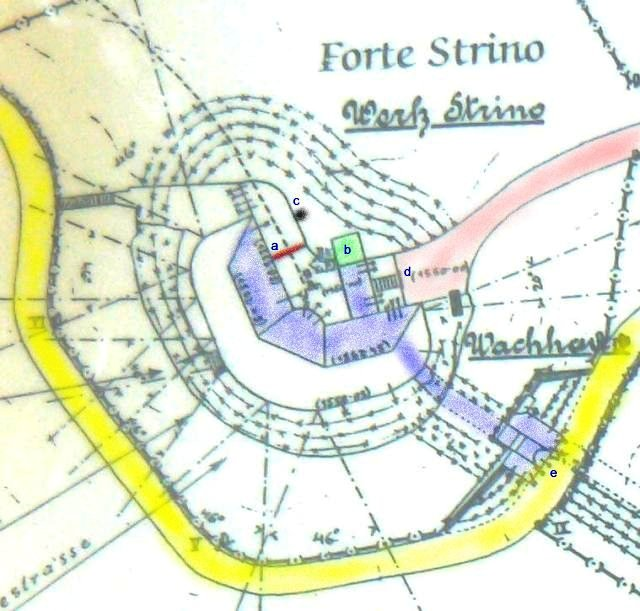
A primitive drawing of the fort showing its different sectors and firing sectors.

The Strino Roadblock is an Austro-Hungarian roadblock built to guard the Tonale Pass and the Sole Valley in Northern Italy. While some sources indicate that the fort was built between 1860 and 1866, others indicate between 1860 and 1861. Strino was the first built to guard the Sole Valley, and was part of the Tonale Roadblock system. The fort had a power generator, telephone, optical signal lights, and a pipe from the Strino River for water.

As advancements in artillery were made, the Roadblock was becoming more and more obsolete. Strino lacked sufficient firepower to repel an assault from the front and sides. Despite knowing this, the Austrians did nothing about it for the time being. The Austrians finally did something about it in 1899. The artillery positions were redone, and the wooden roof was replaced by a concrete one. In 1898, an outlying fortification was built near Strino. This was Nahkampfanlage (Close Combat Facility) Velon, built on the site of a resort. In 1906, the two fortifications were connected by a stone staircase. Both fortifications were disarmed in 1915.

== Armament ==
Sources vary, here are both:

Source 1:

- Four 15 cm guns
- Two 8 cm field guns
- Four M93 8 mm machine guns

Source 2:

- Four 12 cm guns
- Four 10 cm guns

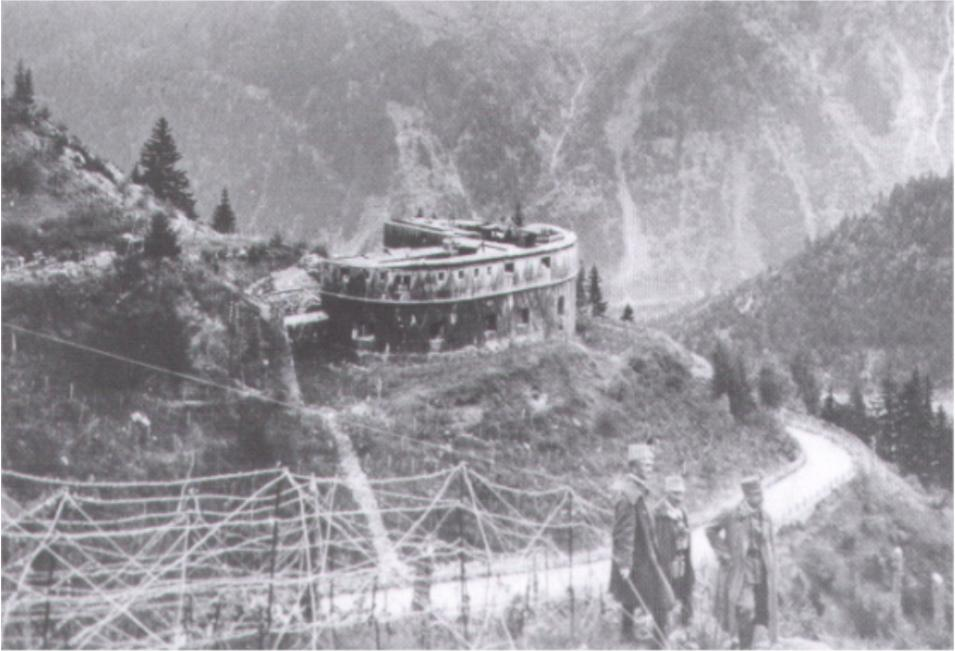
Fort Strino as seen from up the road. This was taken sometime during the war.

== Post-war ==
In the 1930s, Strino was damaged by the Italians in their quest for steel to fuel Mussolini's war with Ethiopia. The building was left in a state of disrepair and neglect for years until the municipality of Vermiglio, with help from Trento, decided to try and restore the fort to its former glory. The work ended in 1997, and the Fort Strino Committee of Vermiglio was founded, and since 2008 they have managed activities and events in the fort. The fort now houses a collection of World War I items and has a model depicting the battle in the Alps.
