= Presanella works =

Austro-Hungarian fortification in Trentino, Italy

Coordinates: 46.2625°N 10.6430°E

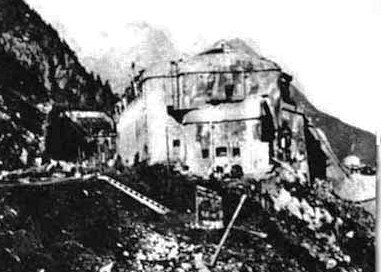
The Presanella Works from the end. This photo was taken sometime during World War I.

The Presanella Roadblock is an Austro-Hungarian fortification built at an altitude of 1880m on the right side of the Vermigliana Valley in Northern Italy. Work started in November 1906, and was finished in 1912. Presanella had the job of blocking the way to the Tonale Pass along with the other fortifications in the area. The original amount set aside for the fort was 198,500 Austro-Hungarian Crowns, but the total cost was 1,456,792 Crowns. The building was built to be self-sufficient, with optical signallers, ammo magazines, infirmary, kitchen, storerooms, and barracks.

== Armament ==
- 3 10 cm M9 howitzers
- 2 M05 8 cm field guns for flanking fire
- 15 8mm Schwarloze machine guns

All 3 howitzer domes and an observation dome can be seen in this photo.

== World War I ==
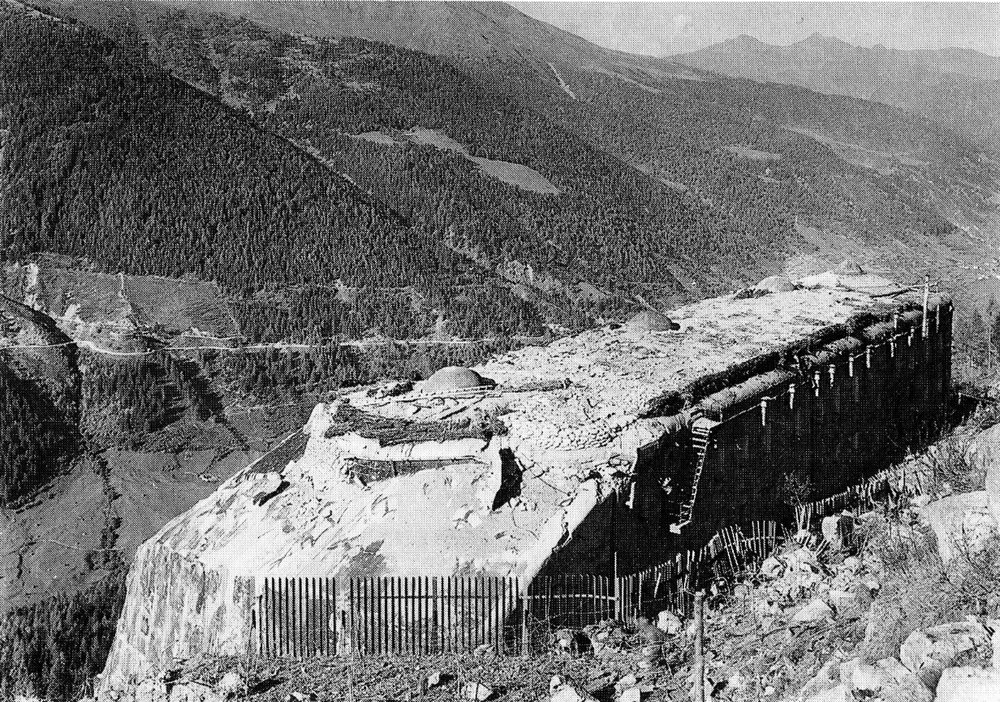
Pretty much an enhanced version of the last image. This was taken after the Italian shelling at the beginning of World War I, as rubble can be seen on the roof.

Presanella was damaged in August 1915, by 2 Italian 28 cm mortars and the guns of Forte Corno D'Aola. Around 450 rounds were fired, but only 18 struck the fort. Afterwards, the Austrians removed the guns to safer field positions. Later in the year, the roadblock became the command center for one of the defending divisions in the area. In November 1918, the fort's guns, now in field positions nearby, fired in support of the army's retreat. The Italian Command ordered Capt. Patroni and his 161st Alpini company to capture the roadblock. Despite the bravery of his men, the Austro-Hungarians swept the approaches of the fort with machine guns to keep the Italians back beyond hand grenade range. In spite of this, Patroni's men managed to get into the roadblock via a tunnel. As his men were entering, an explosion went off inside the Presanella. The Alpini took the initiative as the smoke cleared to catch the Austrians off guard and capture the fort. Capt. Patroni was wounded during this action.

== Post-war to today ==
The fort was greatly damaged during the war, and was damaged more after the war when the Italians blasted the steel out of Presanella. A restoration project was started in 2008, by the municipality of Vermiglio and Autonomous Province of Trento, with the goal of opening it to the public while preserving the history. The decision was made to leave a major part of the rubble, clear vegetation, and shore up the building so that tours can happen. The roadblock was made to be an open-air museum and is now open to the public.
