= Sass Maor =

Mountain in Italy

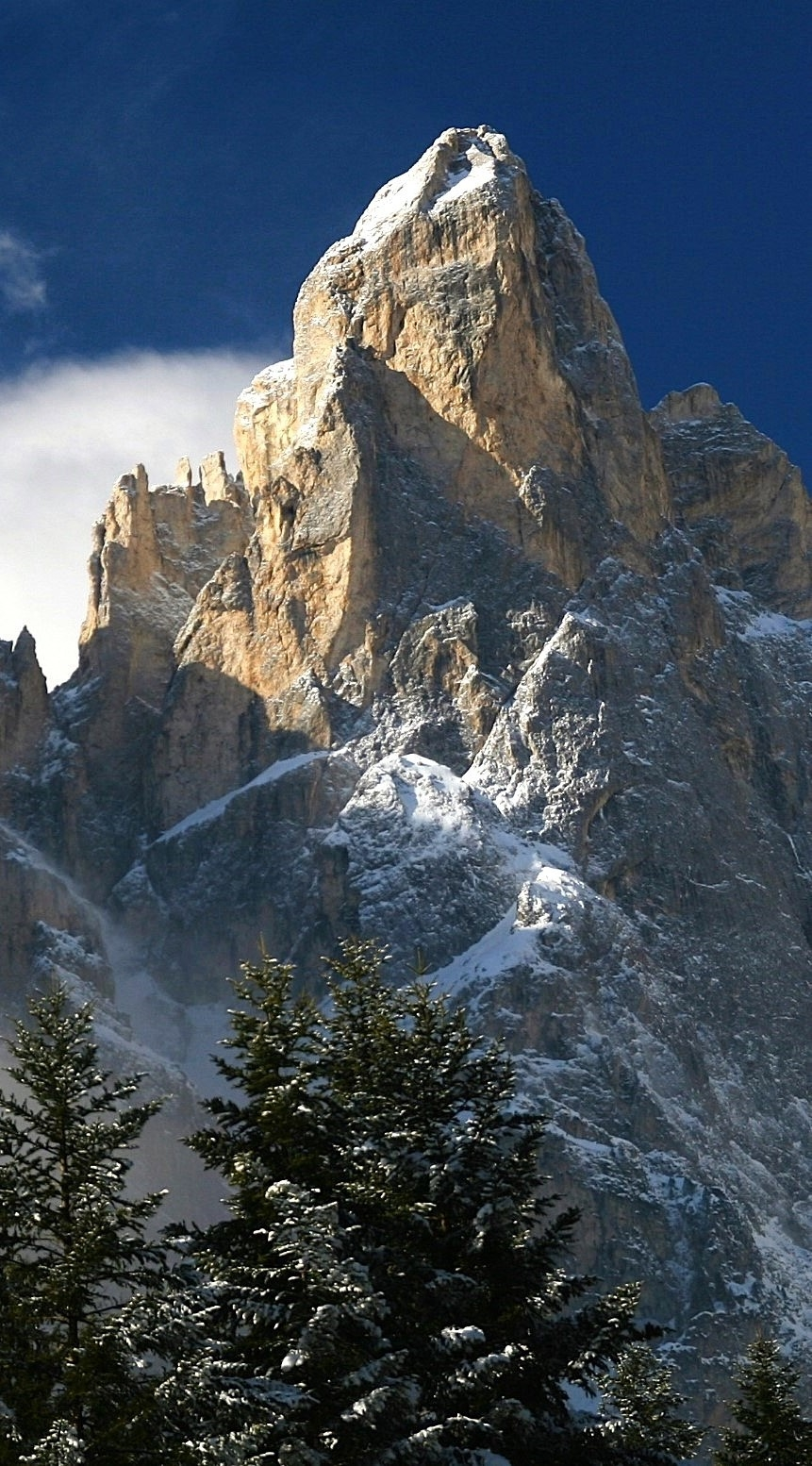
- Southeast aspect

Highest point
- Elevation: 2,814 m (9,232 ft)
- Prominence: 391 m (1,283 ft)
- Parent peak: Vezzana
- Isolation: 1.77 km (1.10 mi)
- Coordinates: 46°13′57″N 11°50′54″E

Geography
- Location within Italy
- Country: Italy
- Region: Trentino-Alto Adige/Südtirol
- Protected area: Paneveggio-Pale di San Martino Natural Park
- Parent range: Dolomites; Pale di San Martino
- Topo map: Tabacco Maps Pale di San Martino

Geology
- Rock age: Triassic
- Rock type: Dolomite

Climbing
- First ascent: 1875

Sass Maor is a mountain in Trentino-Alto Adige/Südtirol of northern Italy.

== Description ==
Sass Maor is a 2,814-meter-elevation (9,232-foot) summit in the Pale di San Martino group of the Dolomites. The peak is located five kilometers (3.1 miles) southeast of San Martino di Castrozza mountain resort, and the peak is within Paneveggio-Pale di San Martino Natural Park, a UNESCO World Heritage Site. Precipitation runoff from the mountain's slopes drains into tributaries of the Cismon. Topographic relief is significant as the summit rises 1,700 meters (5,577 feet) above the Cismon in 2.5 kilometers (1.55 miles), and 1,200 meters (3,937 feet) above the Rio Pradidali in one kilometer (0.6 mile). The nearest higher neighbor is Cima Canali, 1.77 kilometers (1.1 miles) to the northeast. The mountain's toponym translates from Ladin language as "Great Stone" or "Big Rock." The first ascent of the summit was accomplished on September 4, 1875, by Henry Awdry Beachcroft, Charles Comyns Tucker, François Devouassoud, and Battista Della Santa via the Sass Maòr–Cima della Madonna gap.

== Climbing ==
Climbing routes with first ascents:

- Via Breach – Beachcroft, Tucker, Devouassoud, Della Santa – (1875)
- Normal Route – Demeter Diamantidi, Michele Bettega, Luigi Cesaletti, Francesco Colesel – (1881)
- North Wall – Antonio Tavernaro, Ludwig Norman-Neruda – (1893)
- Solleder – Emil Solleder, Franz Kummer – (1926)
- Southeast Spigolo – Ettore Castiglioni, Bruno Detassis – (1934)
- Biasin-Scalet – Giancarlo Biasin, Samuele Scalet – (1964)
- South Spigolo – Guido Pagani, Ben Laritti – (1974)
- Supermatita – Maurizio Zanolla, Piero Valmassoi – (1980)
- Masada – Samuele Scalet, Marco Canteri, Davide Depaoli – (2001)

A significant rockfall in December 2011 on the East Face affected multiple rock-climbing routes.

== Climate ==
Based on the Köppen climate classification, Sass Maor is located in an alpine climate zone with long, cold winters, and short, mild summers. Weather systems are forced upward by the mountains (orographic lift), causing moisture to drop in the form of rain and snow. The months of June through September offer the most favorable weather for climbing or visiting this area.

== Gallery ==
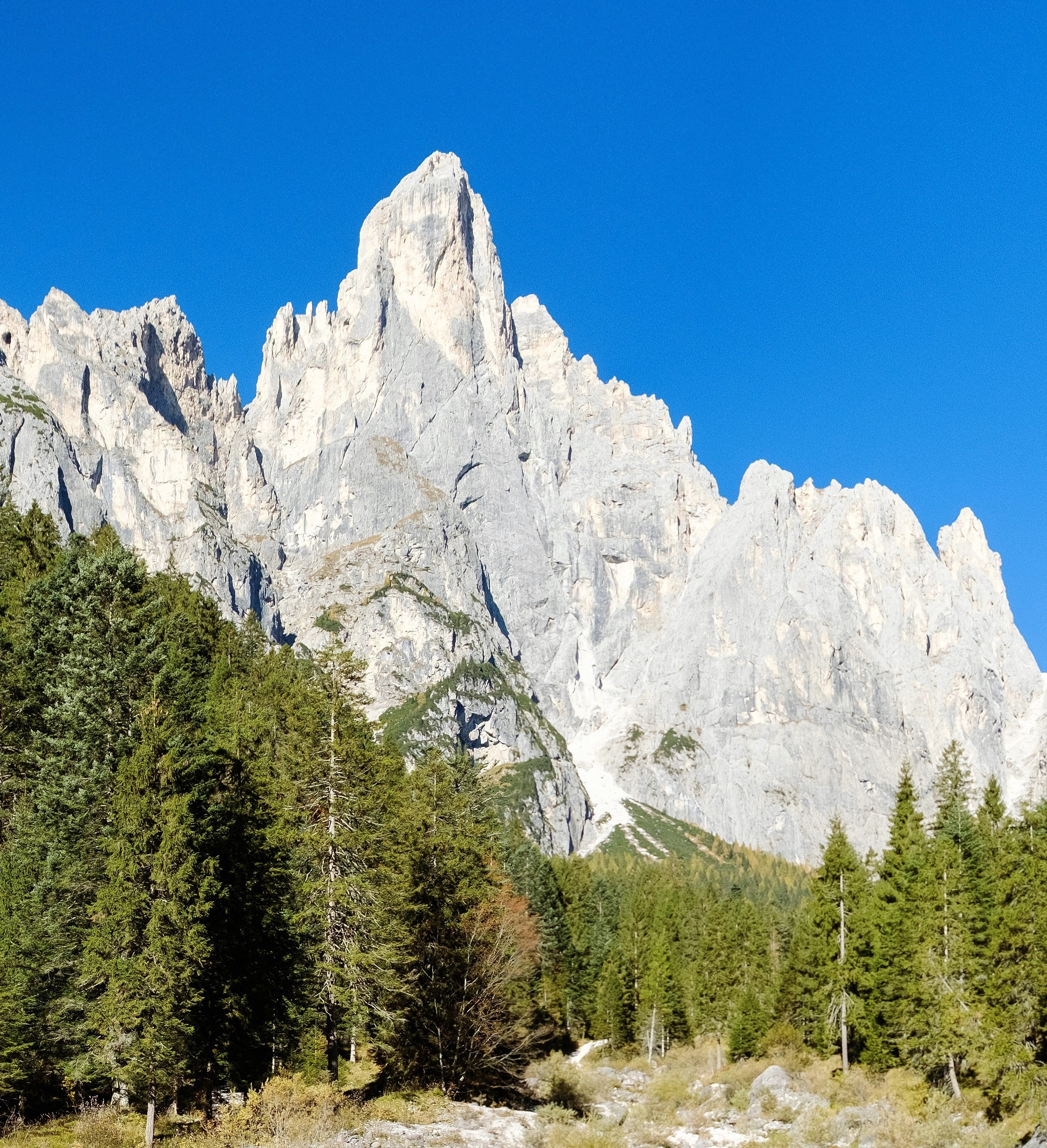
Southeast aspect

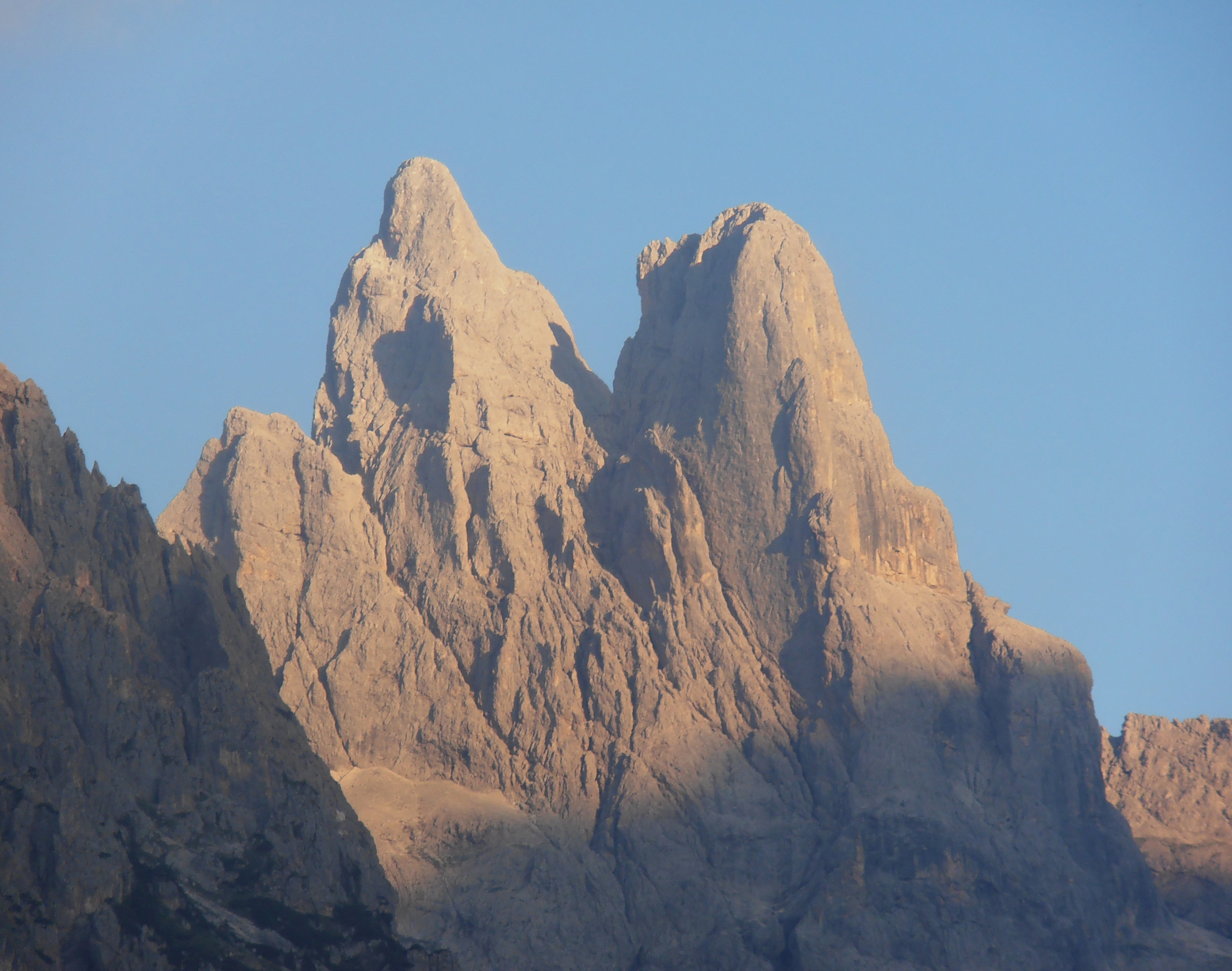
Sass Maor (left) and Cima della Madonna (right)

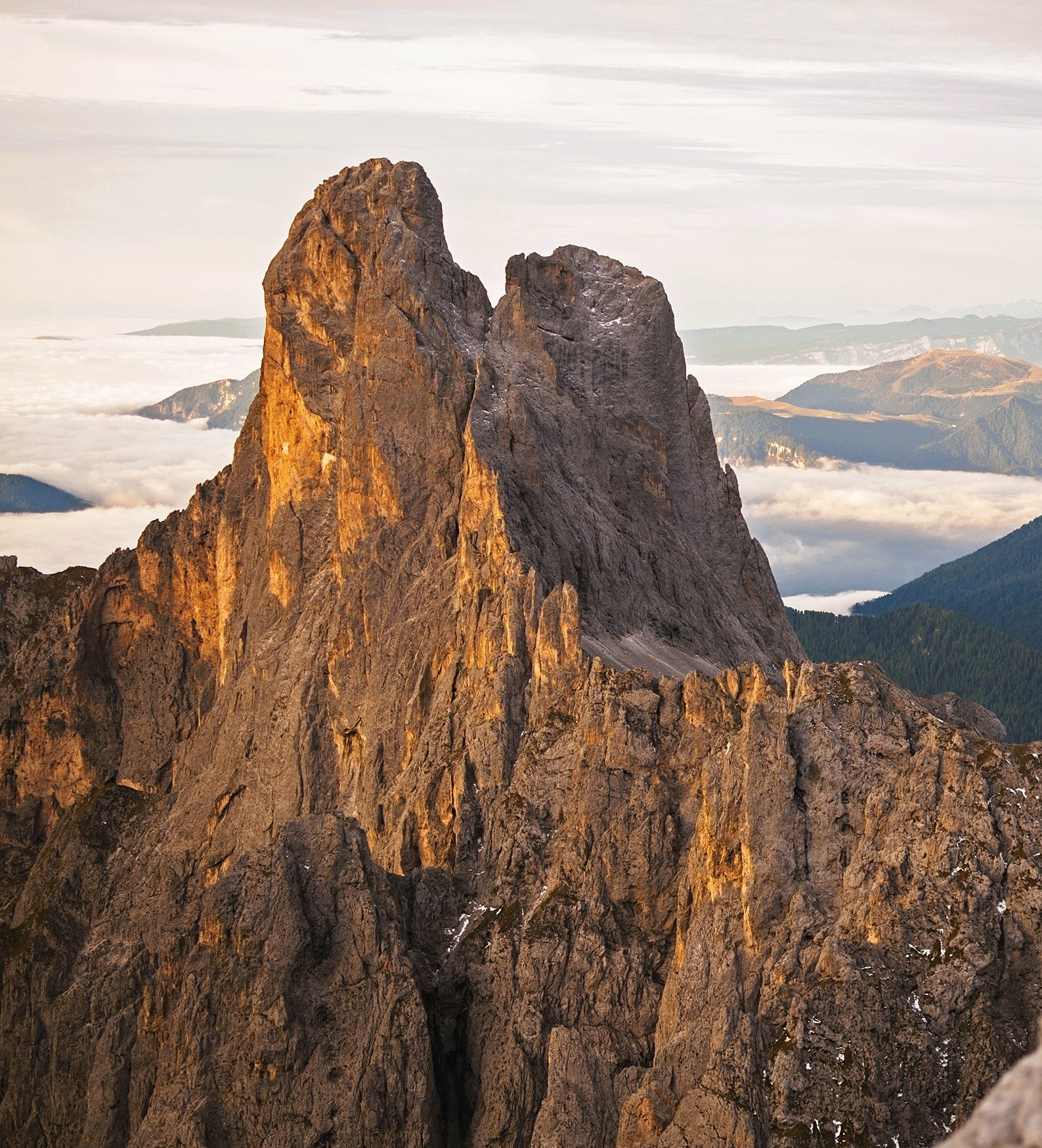
Northeast aspect of Sass Maor viewed from Passo delle Lede

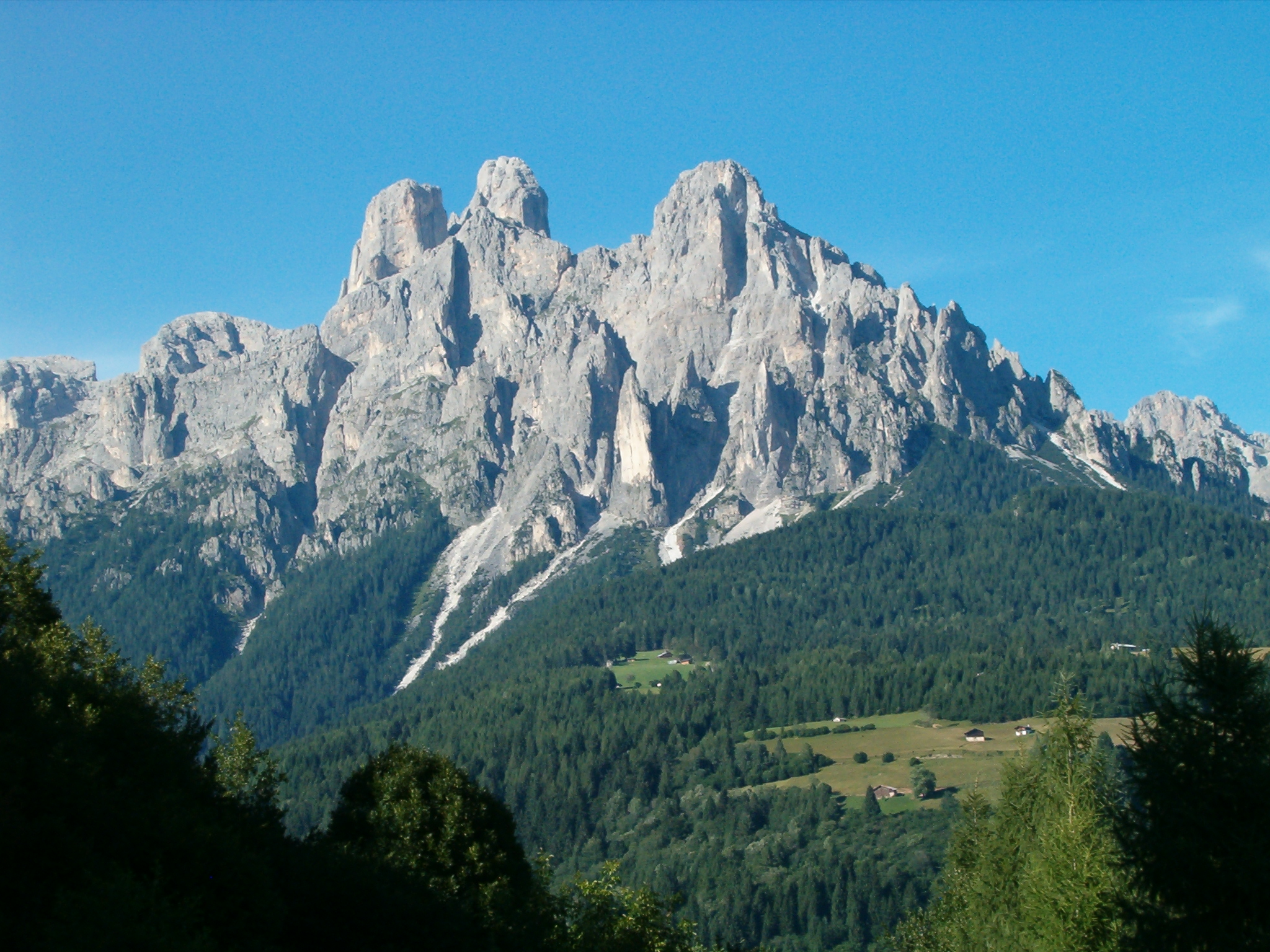
Cima della Madonna, Sass Maor, and Cimerlo

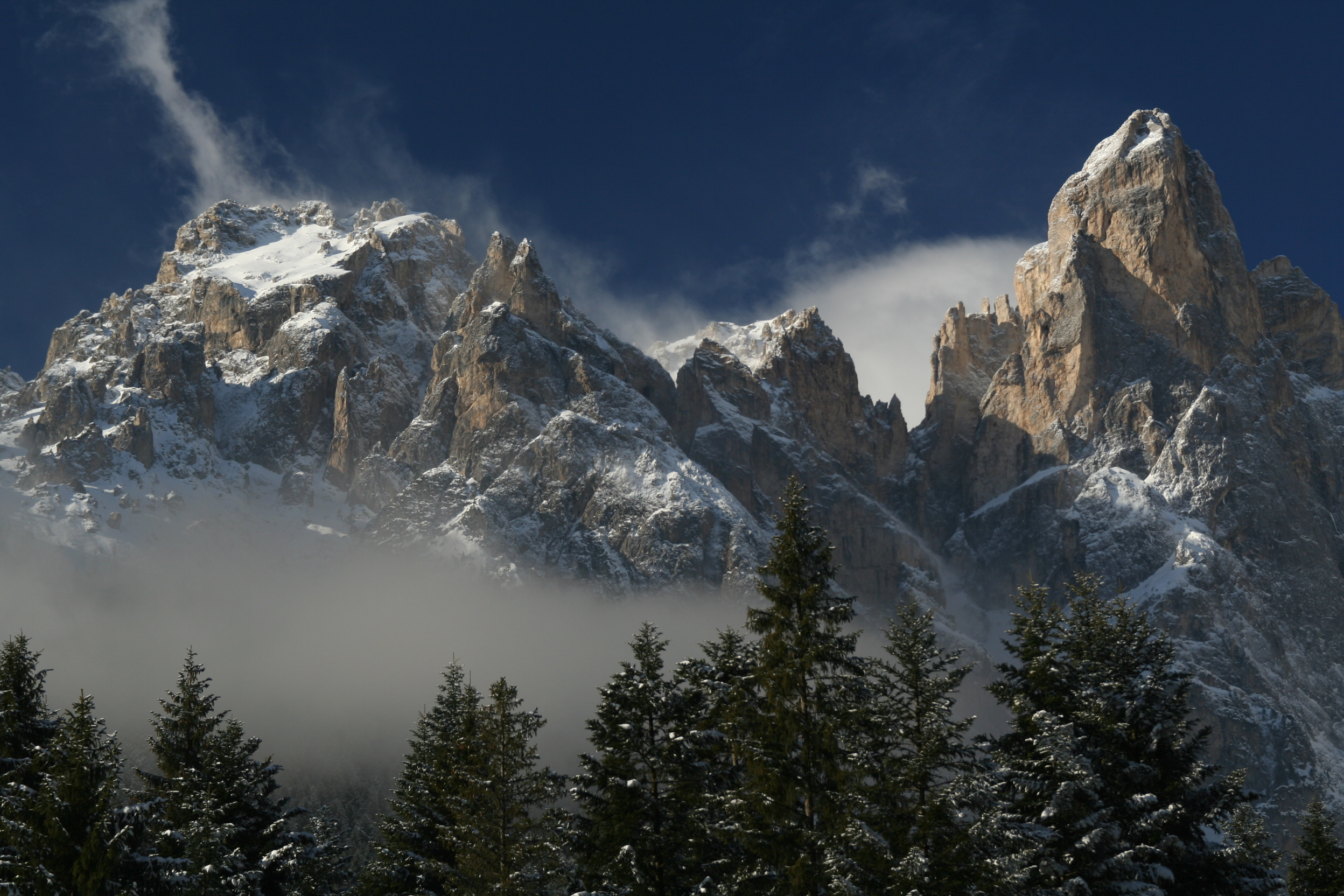
Cimerlo (left) and Sass Maor (right)

== See also ==
- Southern Limestone Alps
