= Croce Domini Pass =

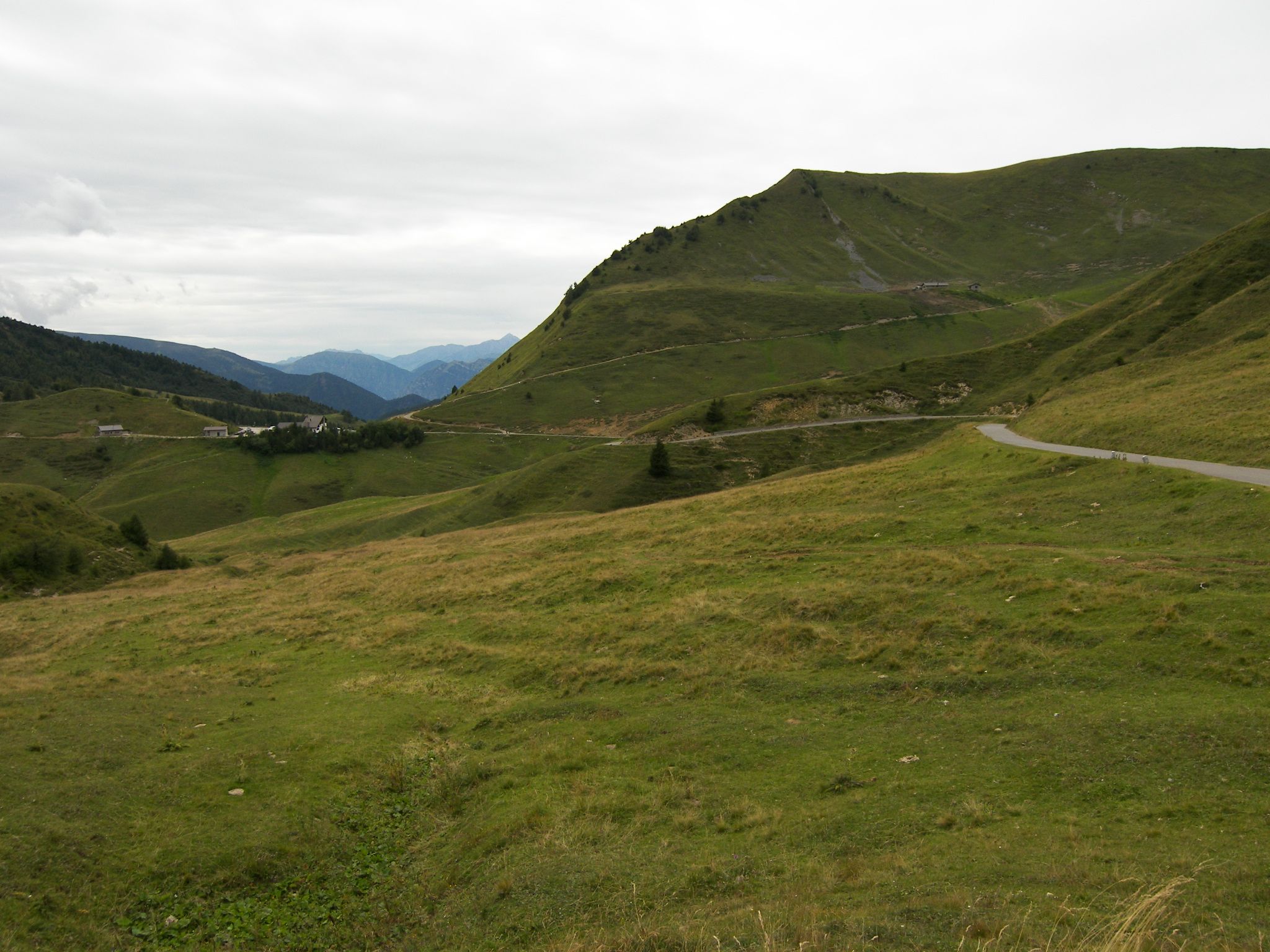
- View from Croce Domini Pass

- Location within Alps
- Elevation: 1,892 metres (6,207 ft)
- Traversed by: SP345

Third Approach
- Location: Lombardy, Italy
- Range: Alps
- Coordinates: 45°54′27″N 10°24′34″E

The Croce Domini Pass (Italian: Passo di Crocedomini) (el. 1892 m.) is a high mountain pass in the Alps in the Adamello-Presanella Alps in the region of Lombardy in Italy.

It connects the Lago d'Idro in the southeast and the Lago d'Iseo in the southwest.

The pass road has a maximum grade of 12 percent and is paved from Breno to Bagolino. The pass is closed from November to May.

== See also ==
- List of highest paved roads in Europe
- List of mountain passes
