= Nahkampfanlage Velon =

Austro-Hungarian fortifications near the Swiss border

Coordinates: 46°16′42″N 10°38′41″E

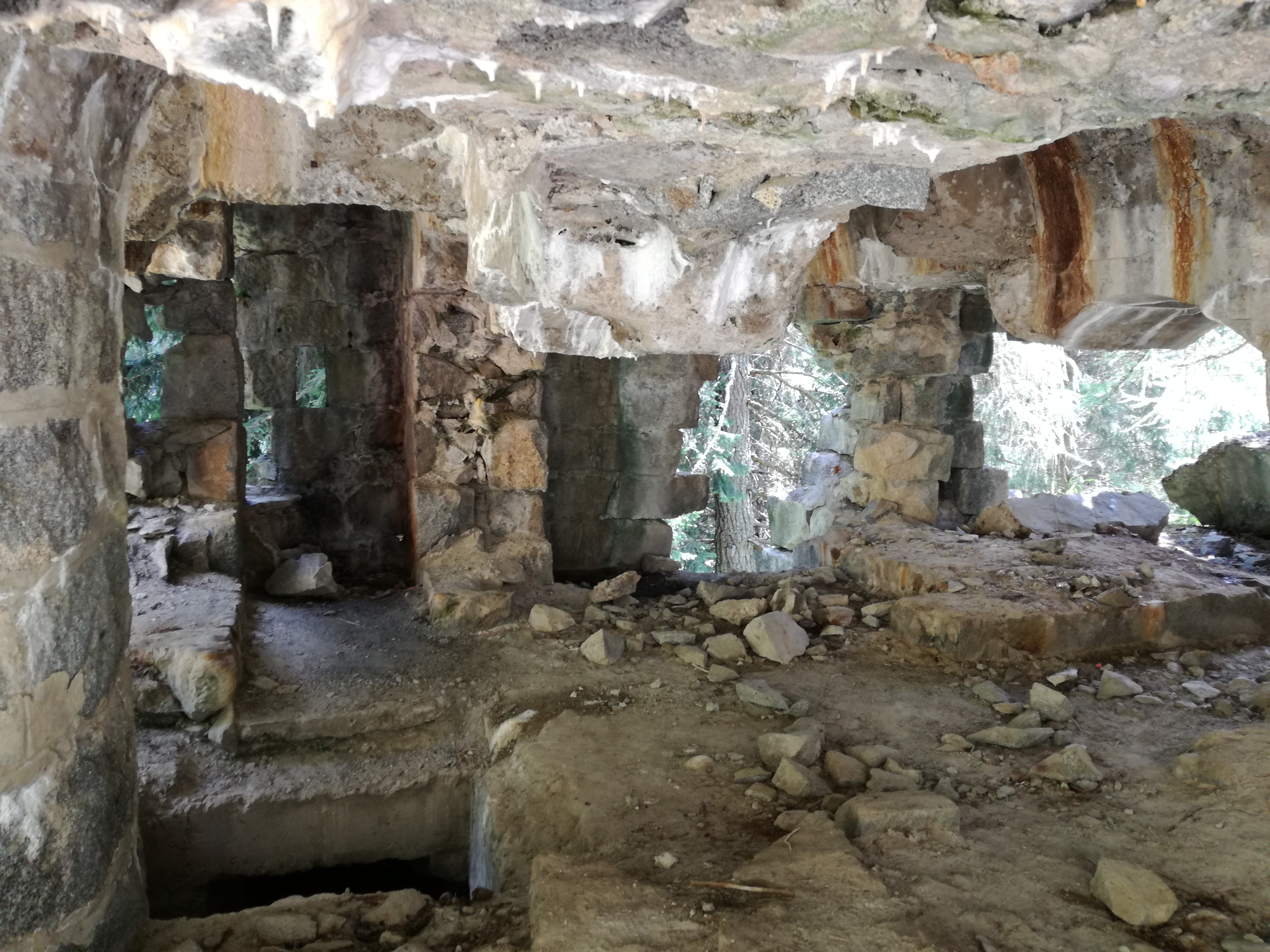
Velon's interior today, it was heavily damaged by salvagers in the 1930s

Nahkampfanlage Velon was an Austro-Hungarian fortification built to support the aging Strino Roadblock. Built in 1891, Velon was built out of stone, which eventually made it obsolete after artillery became more powerful. In some places armored shields and reinforced concrete were used to reinforce the structure. In 1906, the Strino Roadblock and Velon were connected by an underground staircase. In 1907, Velon received a street level guard post. Velon was armed with two 8 cm cannons and two 8 mm heavy machine guns. Velon also had the job of blocking the Vermiglia Valley.

In 1915, Velon, alongside Strino, was disarmed. Summarily, it was turned into the telephone exchange for the defensive district. Today, Velon is damaged not because of Italian shells, but from salvagers removing the steel to fuel Mussolini's war with Ethiopia in the 1930s.
