= Carè Alto =

Mountain in Italy

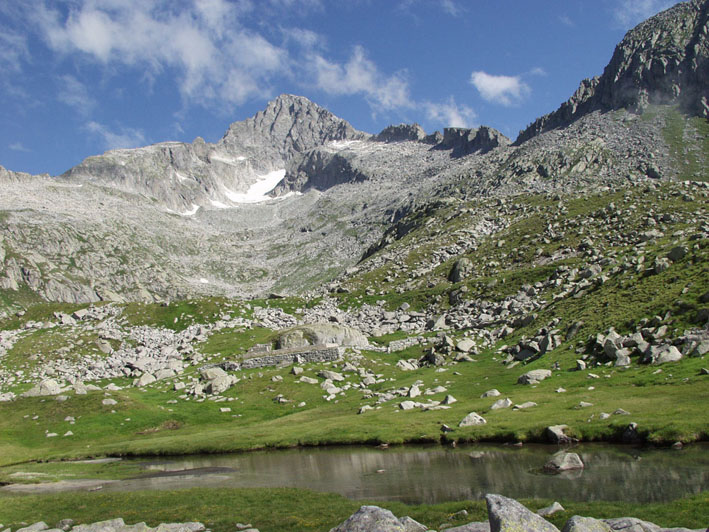

Highest point
- Elevation: 3,463 m (11,362 ft)
- Listing: Alpine mountains above 3000 m
- Coordinates: 46°04′00″N 10°37′00″E

Geography
- Location within Italy
- Location: Pelugo, Trento Italy
- Parent range: Adamello-Presanella

Climbing
- First ascent: August 5, 1865 S.T Taylor, H.F. Montgomery

Carè Alto is a mountain in the Italian Alps, near Trento, above the San Valentino valley. It has a summit elevation of 3,463 m (11,362 ft). It is a mountain of the Adamello-Presanella Group in the provinces of Trentino and Brescia and is part of the Southern Limestone Alps.

== See also ==
- List of mountains of the Alps
