= Lago d'Arno =

Lake in Lombardy, Italy

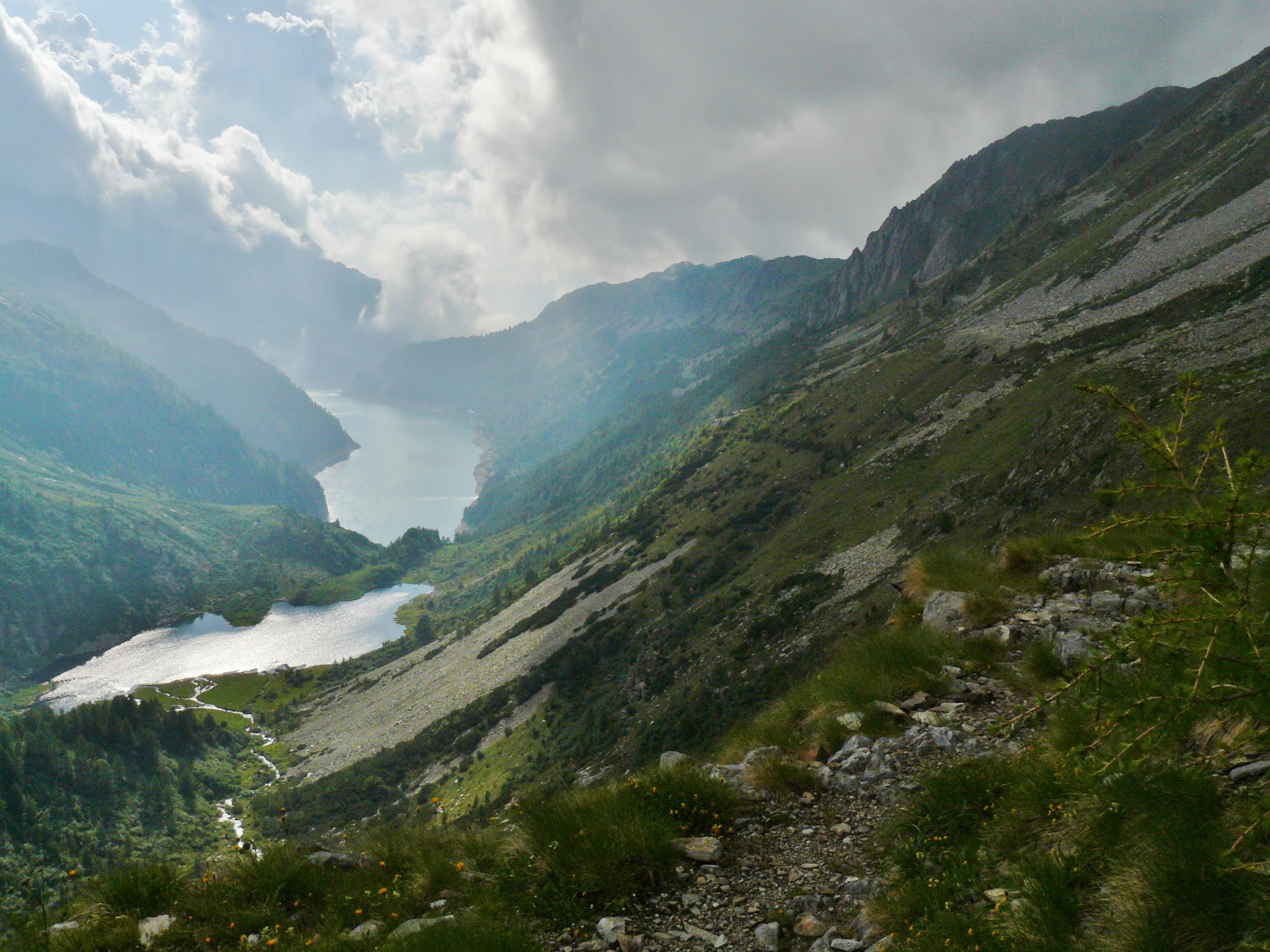

- Location within Italy
- Location: Province of Brescia, Lombardy
- Coordinates: 46°02′46″N 10°26′19″E
- Type: Lake
- Primary outflows: Rio Piz
- Basin countries: Italy
- Surface elevation: 1,817 m (5,961 ft)

Lago d'Arno is a lake in the Province of Brescia, Lombardy, Italy. In 1911 it was dammed, which increased its maximum capacity in order to obtain a reserve for the hydroelectric industry.

It lies in a glacial basin southeast of the Saviore Valley and is approximately 2,400 meters long, 430 meters wide, and has an elongated "S" shape. With a maximum surface area of 86.2 hectares, it is the largest lake in the Camonica Valley. The lake is fed by the Ghilarda stream, which is why the Arno Valley, one of the three valleys of the Saviore Valley (the other two are the Salarno and Adamé valleys), is also known as the Ghilarda Valley. Its waters, harnessed by a dam, are used to generate hydroelectric power and power the San Fiorano power plant, thanks to a difference in elevation of approximately 1,300 meters (4265.092 ft).

The lake can only be reached on foot, as the cable car serving the dam has been dismantled. The most direct route begins in Isola (a hamlet of Cevo) where CAI trail number 88 leads steeply to the dam in about 2 hours and 30 minutes. Another route, called the "Three Brothers" (trail number 22) because it crosses three rocky valleys, begins in Paspardo and reaches the dam by cutting across the northern slopes of Mount Colombé, in about 3 hours and 15 minutes. A third route is from Valle di Saviore. Starting from Rasega, take trail number 20; the hike also takes about 3 hours and 15 minutes.
