= Tonale Pass =

Mountain pass in Italy

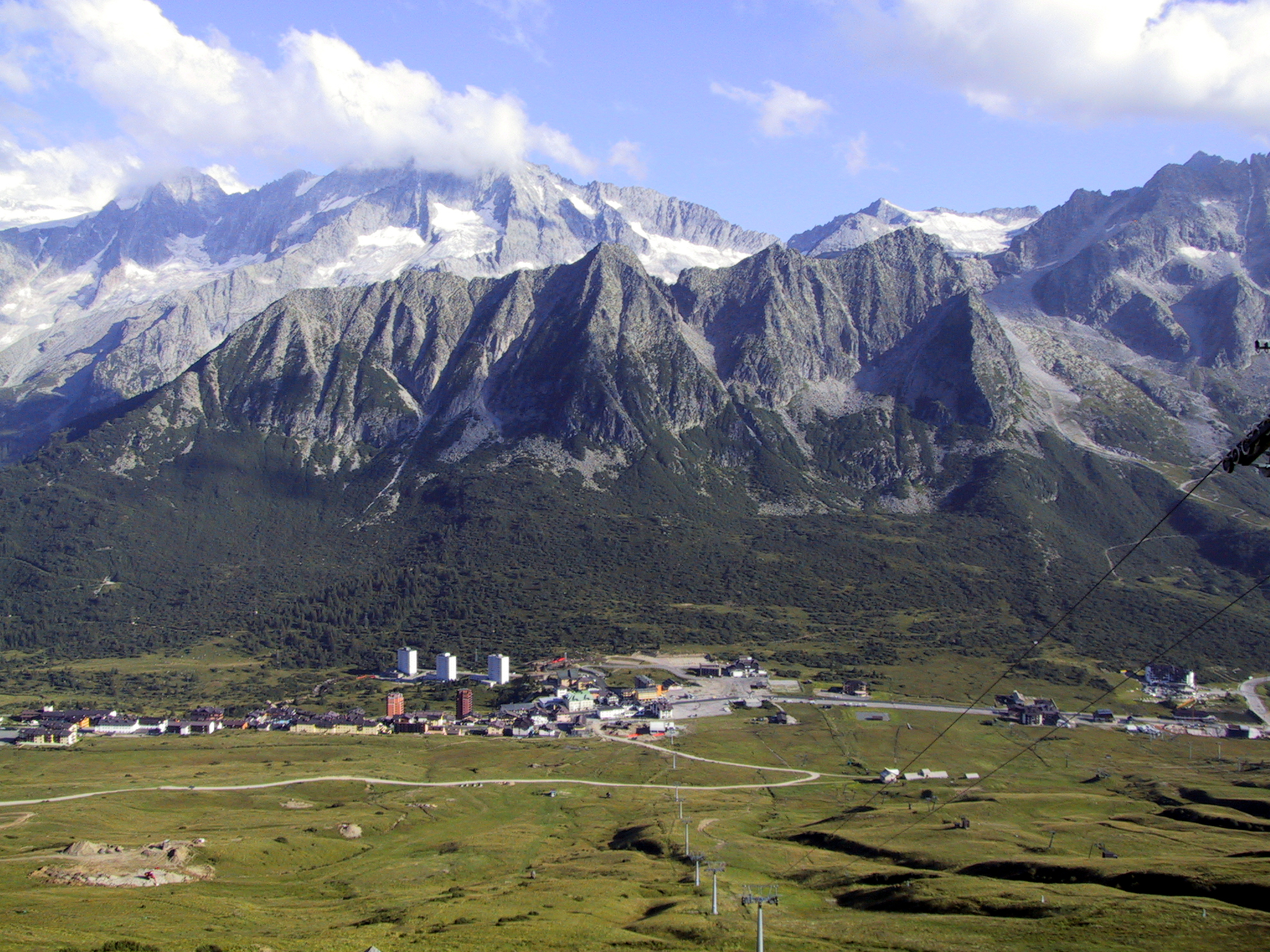
- Tonale Pass

- Location within Alps
- Elevation: 1,883 m (6,178 ft)

Third Approach
- Location: Lombardy/Trentino, Italy
- Range: Rhaetian Alps; Adamello-Presanella Alps
- Coordinates: 46°15′29″N 10°34′51″E

Tonale Pass (Italian: Passo del Tonale) (el. 1883 m./6178 ft.) is a high mountain pass in northern Italy across the Rhaetian Alps, between Lombardy and Trentino.

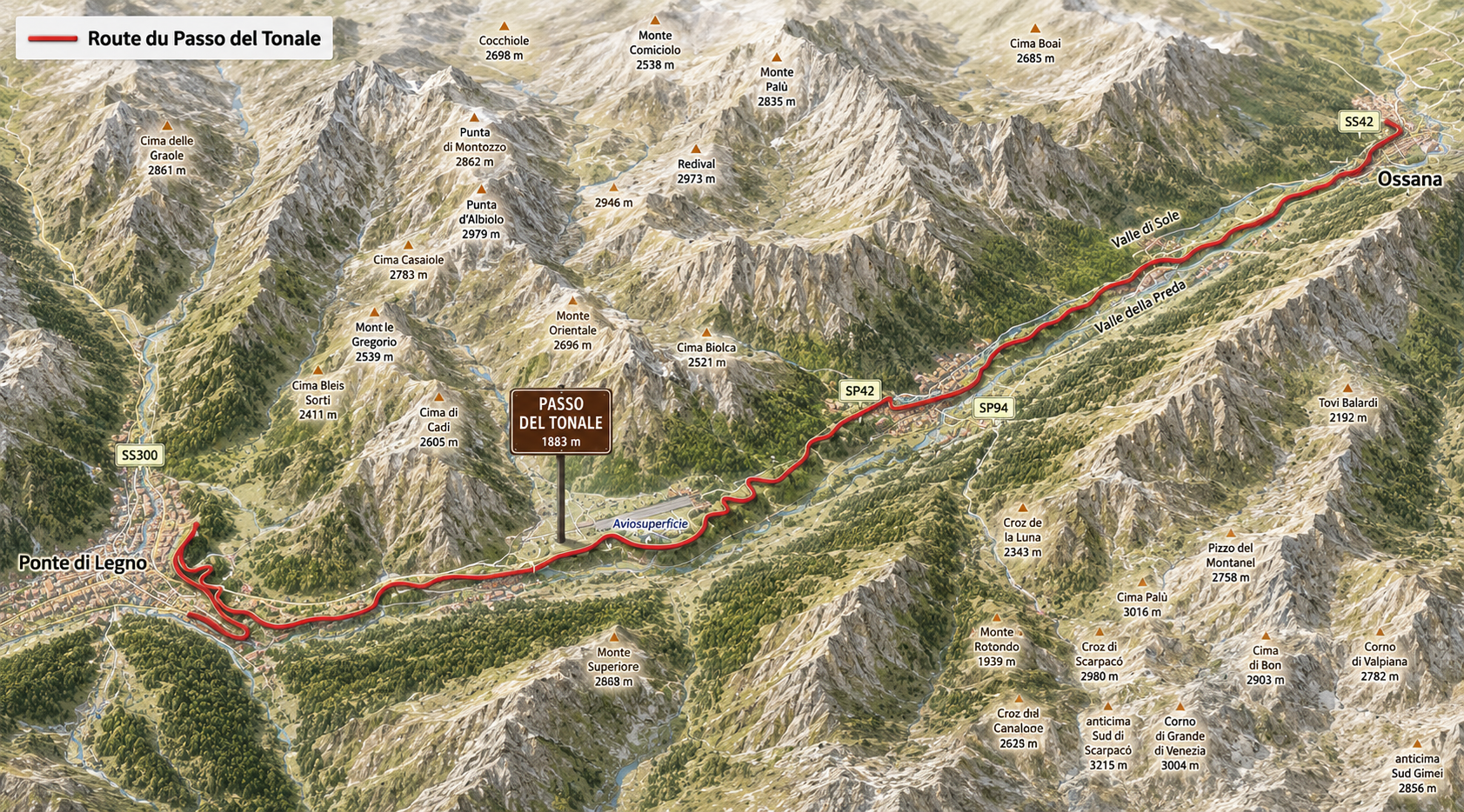

It connects Valcamonica and Val di Sole. It is delimited by the Ortler Alps to the north and the Adamello range to the south.

The pass has hotels and shops for tourists in winter, as the land around the pass is used for winter sports – mainly skiing (see Adamello Ski Raid) and snowboarding.

During World War I the place was heavily fought for between Italians holding Western side (Lombardy) and the troops of Habsburg Empire holding the Eastern side (Trentino). A memorial for the fallen Italian soldiers was erected during the fascist period.

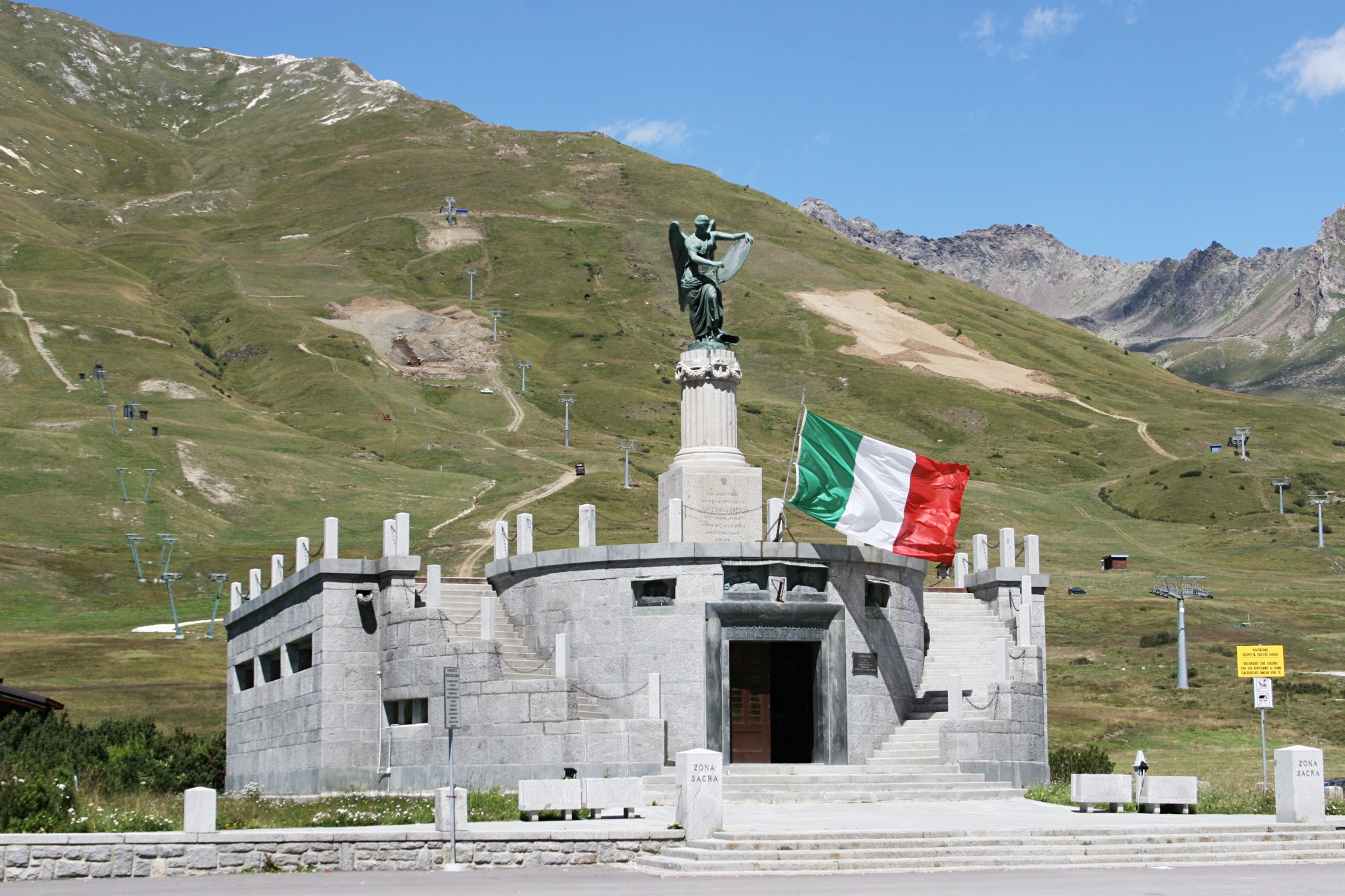
WW I memorial (Monumento Ossario) on Passo del Tonale

== Climate ==
Climate data for Tonale Pass, elevation 1,795 m (5,889 ft), (1971–2000)
Month	Jan	Feb	Mar	Apr	May	Jun	Jul	Aug	Sep	Oct	Nov	Dec	Year
Mean daily maximum °C (°F)	−0.2 (31.6)	0.9 (33.6)	3.9 (39.0)	6.7 (44.1)	11.6 (52.9)	15.1 (59.2)	18.2 (64.8)	17.7 (63.9)	13.6 (56.5)	8.7 (47.7)	3.0 (37.4)	0.1 (32.2)	8.3 (46.9)
Daily mean °C (°F)	−4.2 (24.4)	−3.8 (25.2)	−1.1 (30.0)	1.8 (35.2)	6.5 (43.7)	9.7 (49.5)	12.3 (54.1)	11.9 (53.4)	8.2 (46.8)	4.1 (39.4)	−1.0 (30.2)	−3.5 (25.7)	3.4 (38.1)
Mean daily minimum °C (°F)	−8.2 (17.2)	−8.6 (16.5)	−6.1 (21.0)	−3.1 (26.4)	1.3 (34.3)	4.3 (39.7)	6.4 (43.5)	6.1 (43.0)	3.1 (37.6)	−0.4 (31.3)	−4.9 (23.2)	−7.2 (19.0)	−1.4 (29.4)
Average precipitation mm (inches)	70 (2.8)	55 (2.2)	79 (3.1)	122 (4.8)	148 (5.8)	130 (5.1)	124 (4.9)	126 (5.0)	123 (4.8)	162 (6.4)	104 (4.1)	82 (3.2)	1,325 (52.2)
Source: Istituto Superiore per la Protezione e la Ricerca Ambientale

== See also ==
- List of highest paved roads in Europe
- List of mountain passes
- Tonalite
