= Monte Frerone =

Mountain in Italy

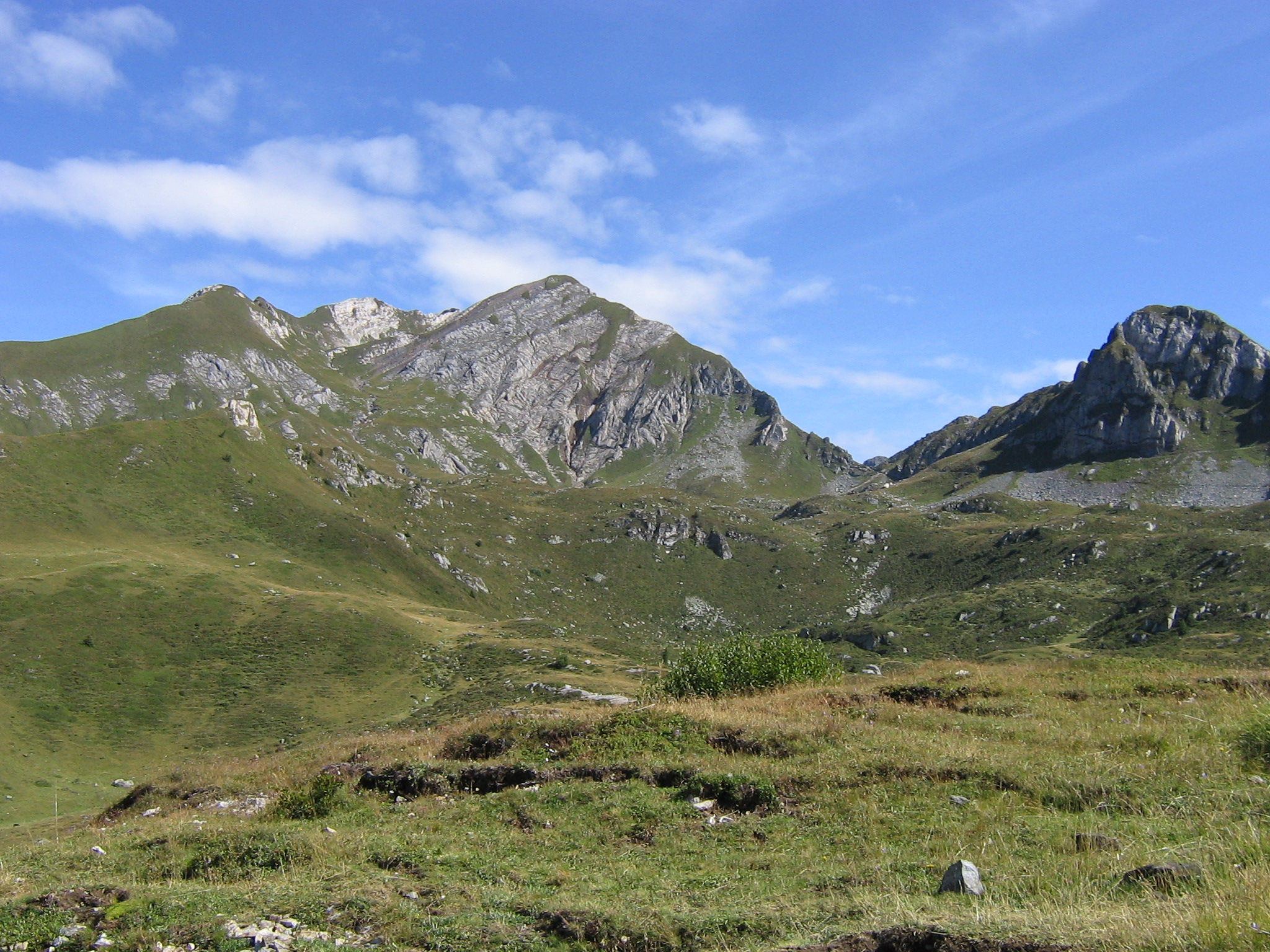

Highest point
- Elevation: 2,673 m (8,770 ft)
- Coordinates: 45°56′44″N 10°24′48″E

Geography
- Location within Italy
- Location: Lombardy, Italy
- Parent range: Alps

Monte Frerone is a mountain of Lombardy, Italy, It has an elevation of 2673 metres.
