= Fort Tonale =

Austro-Hungarian fortification in Trentino, Italy

Coordinates: 46°16′47″N 10°37′25″E

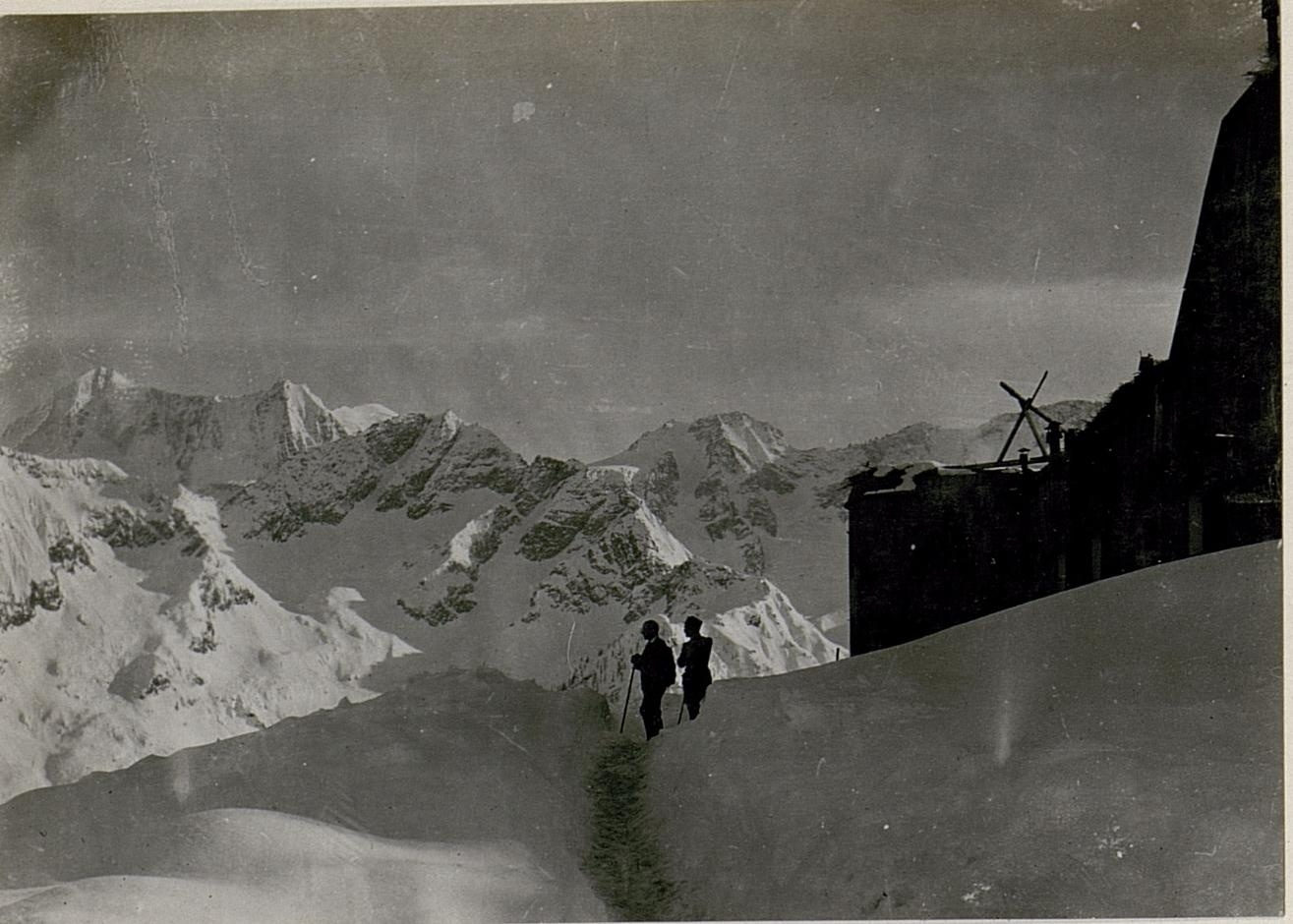
2 Austro-Hungarian soldiers watch over the Sole Valley, Tonale can be seen on the right side up against the cliffs.

Fort Tonale (German: Werk Tonale) also known as Fort Zaccarana or Saccarana (Italian: Forte Zaccarana), is an Austro-Hungarian fortification built to guard the Strino and Sole Valleys in Northern Italy. The fort was built between 1908 and May 1912. The fort was equipped with a generator, telephone room, and a water cistern. Tonale was the communication hub for surrounding fortifications. The crew consisted of 4 officers and 163 enlisted men.

== Armament ==
- 4 M9 10 cm howitzers in armored domes
- 2 8 cm guns in armored domes
- 17 8mm Schwarzlose machine guns
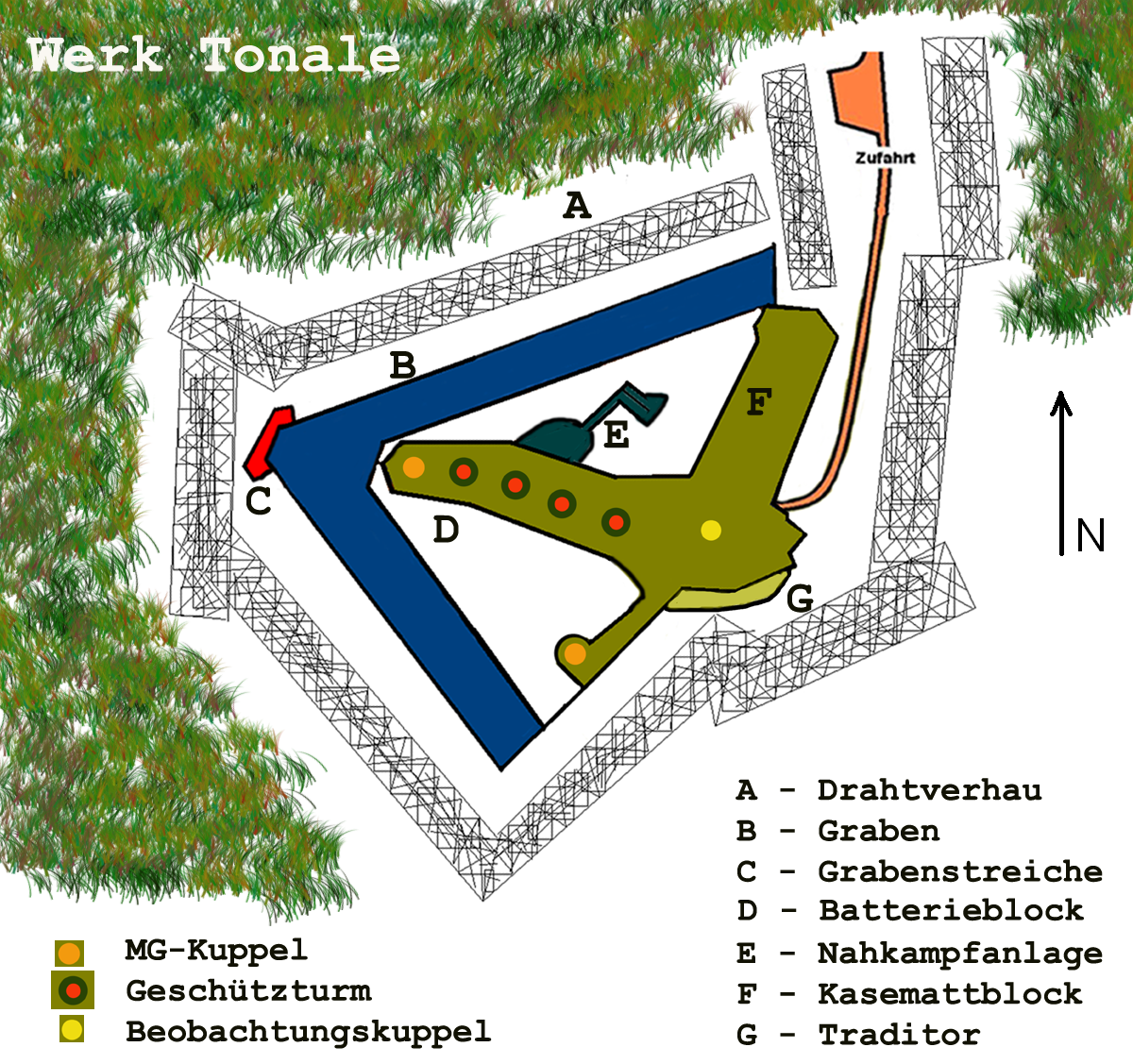
  A drawing depicting the placement of Tonale's defenses.

== World War I ==
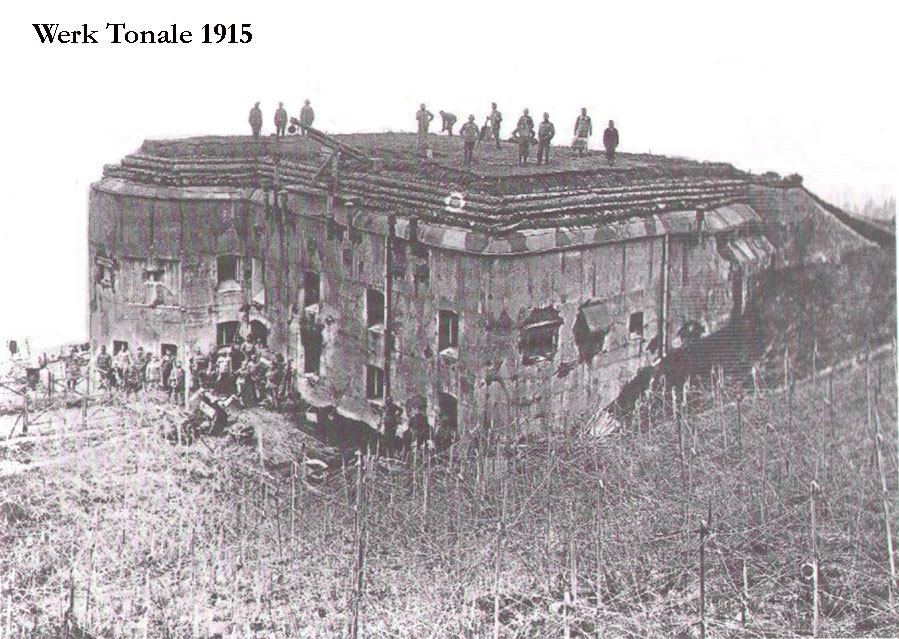
Fort Tonale in 1915, the Austro-Hungarians were in the process of camouflaging the fort in this photo.

In August 1915, the Italian fort Corno D’Aola and 2 28 cm mortars targeted Tonale, causing a great deal of damage. The mortar commander, Captain Sbriscia, straddled the fort 3 times, before scoring a massive hit on the ammo magazine and propelled 1 of the armored domes out of its housings. This killed 5, and wounded 13, with the armored dome reportedly rolling around. The guns were summarily disassembled and moved nearby.

== Post-war ==
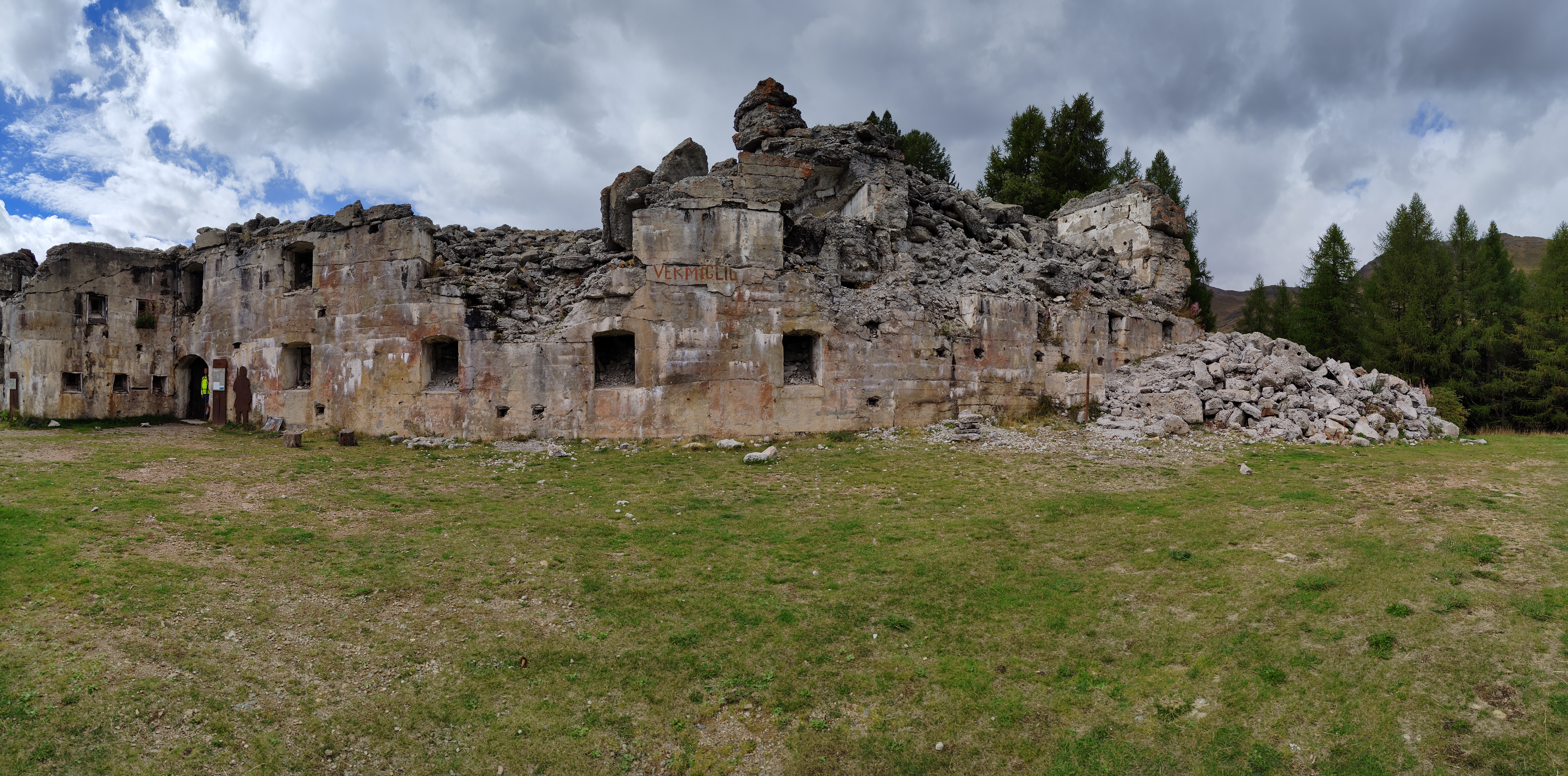
The smashed ruins of Tonale today.

In the 1930s, the Italians decided to scrap the steel from Tonale to help continue Mussolini's war on Ethiopia. This left the fort in ruins. It was eventually made safe to enter in 2009. This meant removing loose concrete blocks and rubble.
