= Corno Baitone =

Mountain in Italy

Coordinates: 46°06′N 10°16′E

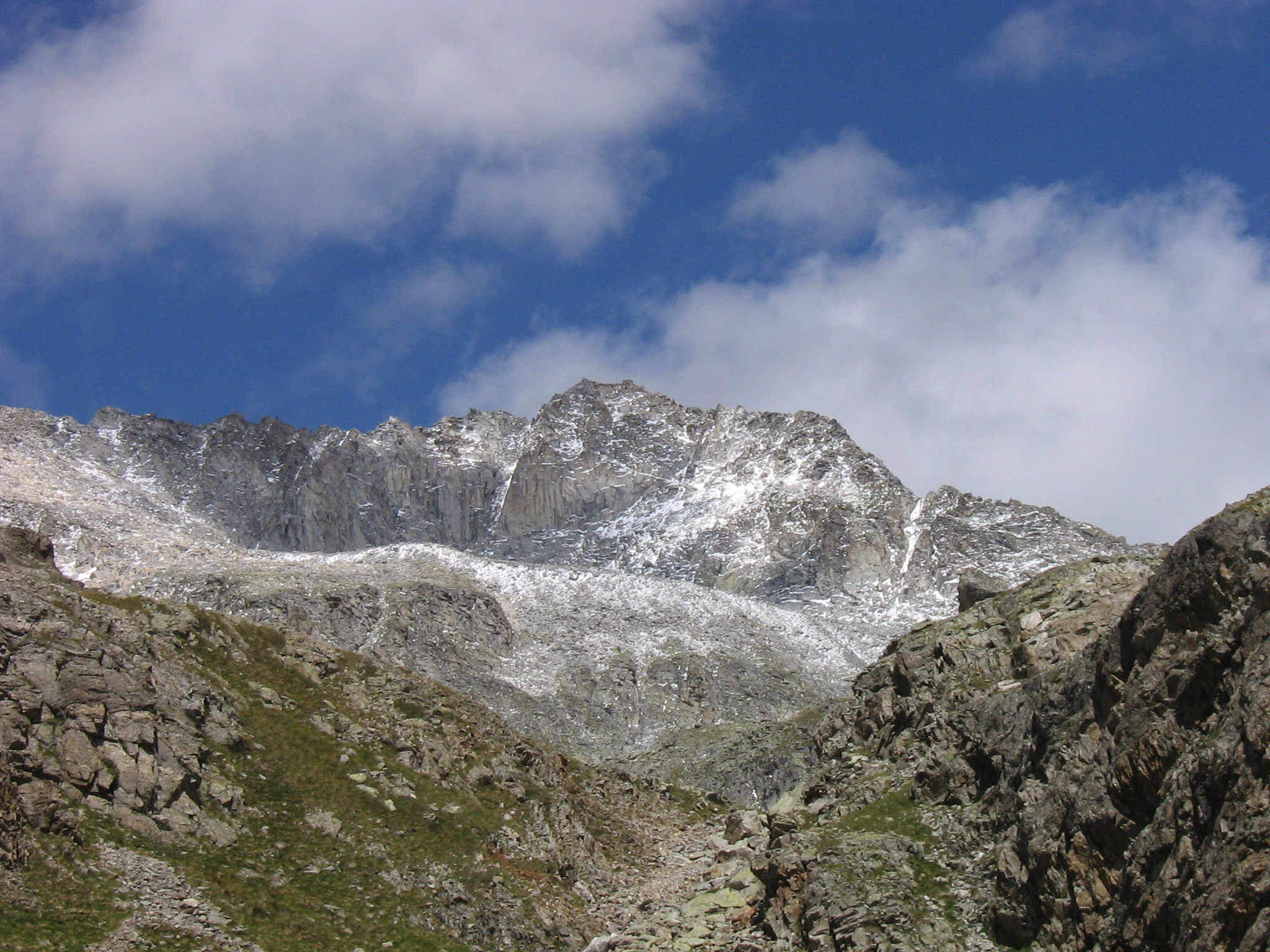

Highest point
- Elevation: 3,330 m (10,930 ft)
- Prominence: 483 m (1,585 ft)
- Listing: Alpine mountains above 3000 m

Geography
- Location: Lombardy, Italy

Corno Baitone is a mountain of Lombardy, Italy. It has an elevation of 3330 metres.

== See also ==
- Lake Baitone
