= François Devouassoud =

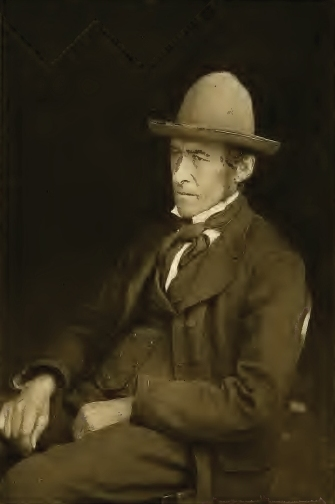
François Devouassoud in a photograph by William de Wiveleslie Abney

François Devouassoud (September 1831 – 1905) was a French mountain guide who made many first ascents in the Alps, notably as guide to Douglas William Freshfield, who claimed that Devouassoud "was the first Alpine guide to carry his ice-axe to the snows of a distant range".

== Life ==
Devouassoud was born in 1831 in the hamlet of Les Barats in the Chamonix valley. The eldest of three brothers, both of whom were also guides, Devouassoud was educated at Sallanches, and subsequently at Bonneville. He passed some time in a Jesuit seminary in his youth and he contemplated becoming a priest but returned to Chamonix.

== Mountaineering ==
=== Alps ===
He was admitted to the Compagnie des guides de Chamonix in 1849. Amongst those who sought his services in the Alps were Freshfield, W. A. B. Coolidge, Francis Fox Tuckett, Horace Walker, Adolphus Warburton Moore and Charles Comyns Tucker. Devouassoud was treasurer of the Compagnie des guides de Chamonix for ten years,<c&a2/> but refused the post of president.

Claire Engel offers the following portrait of Devouassoud, based on the account of Freshfield:

Though perhaps not an outstanding climber, Devouassoud was certainly more than a good guide. He loved exploration and always felt at home in the mountains, whether in Sikkim or Algeria or on the Rowenzori.Though he started guiding very early, in 1849, he knew how to manage a rope and how to proceed on snow slopes. He was able to save the lives of several of his employers. He was at his best on ice. But this grave, refined man, who had a keen sense of humour and taste for culture, was not only an excellent leader on a mountain, he was an ideal companion on long expeditions.

=== Greater Ranges ===
As Freshfield stated, Devouassoud was the first alpine guide to work in the greater ranges. Cunningham and Abney write that he was "the doyen of the pioneers who have set out at different times for the Caucasus, the Himalayas, New Zealand, or the Andes". In 1868 he made the first ascents of Kazbek and the east summit of Elbrus in the Caucasus.

In 1887 he was the subject of a photograph by Abney, possibly the one illustrating this article, entitled "A Chamounix Guide, Francois Devouassoud" at the 32nd Exhibition of Photographic Society of Great Britain.

== First ascents ==
- 25 August 1864 - Presanella with M. Beachcroft, Douglas William Freshfield and Horace Walker
- 16 June 1865 - Grande Mèsule with G. H. Fox, Douglas William Freshfield, Francis Fox Tuckett and Peter Michel
- 28 June 1865 - Pizzo Tresero (Ortles massif) with Francis Fox Tuckett, J.H. Backhouse, G.H. Fox and Peter Michel
- 10 July 1866 - North-west ridge of the Bietschhorn with Charles Comyns Tucker and F. von Allmen
- 27 July 1867 - Piz Badile with William Auguste Coolidge and Henri Devouassoud
- 1 July 1868 - Kazbek with Douglas William Freshfield, Adolphus Warburton Moore and Charles Comyns Tucker
- 31 July 1868 - North-west summit of Elbruz with Douglas William Freshfield, Adolphus Warburton Moore and Charles Comyns Tucker
- 1875 - Sass Maor (Dolomites) with H. A. Beachcroft and Charles Comyns Tucker

== Bibliography ==
- C. D. Cunningham and W. de W. Abney, The Pioneers of the Alps, Boston: Estes and Lauriat, 1888.
- Douglas William Freshfield, The Exploration of the Caucasus, volume 1, London: Edward Arnold, 1902.
