= Monte Tredenus =

Mountain in Italy

Coordinates: 46°00′52″N 10°26′12″E

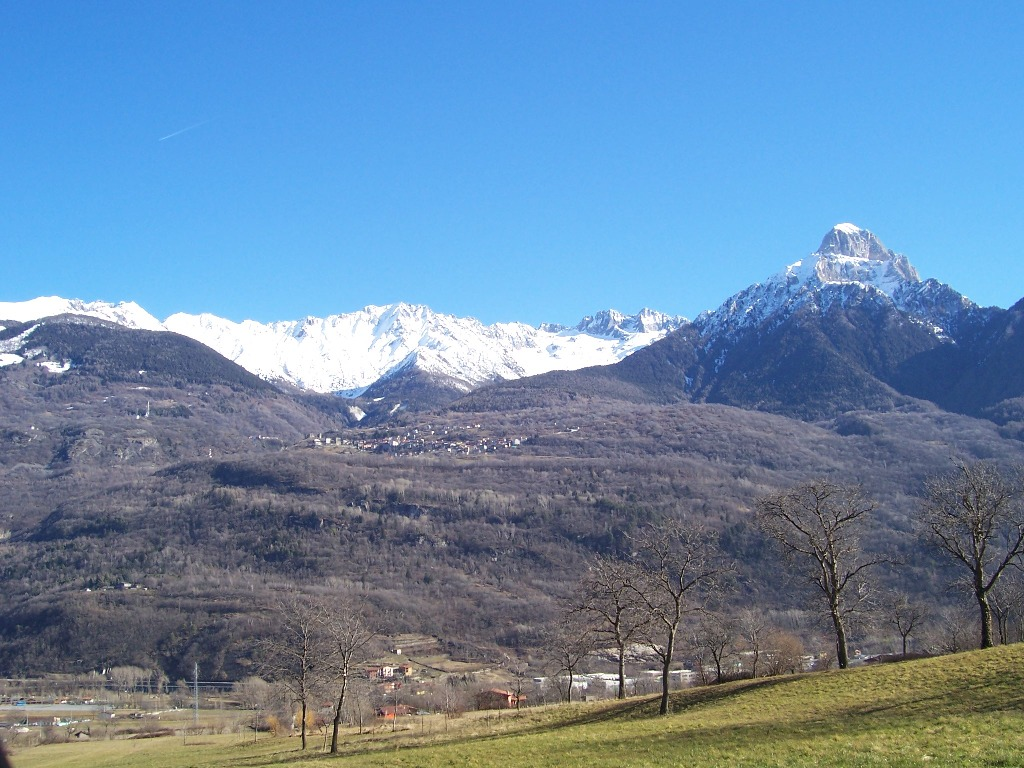
- Tredenus, Val Camonica, Italy

Highest point
- Elevation: 2,796 m (9,173 ft)

Geography
- Location: Lombardy, Italy

Monte Tredenus is a mountain of Lombardy, Italy. It has an elevation of 2,796 metres above sea level.
