= Presanella =

Mountain in Italy

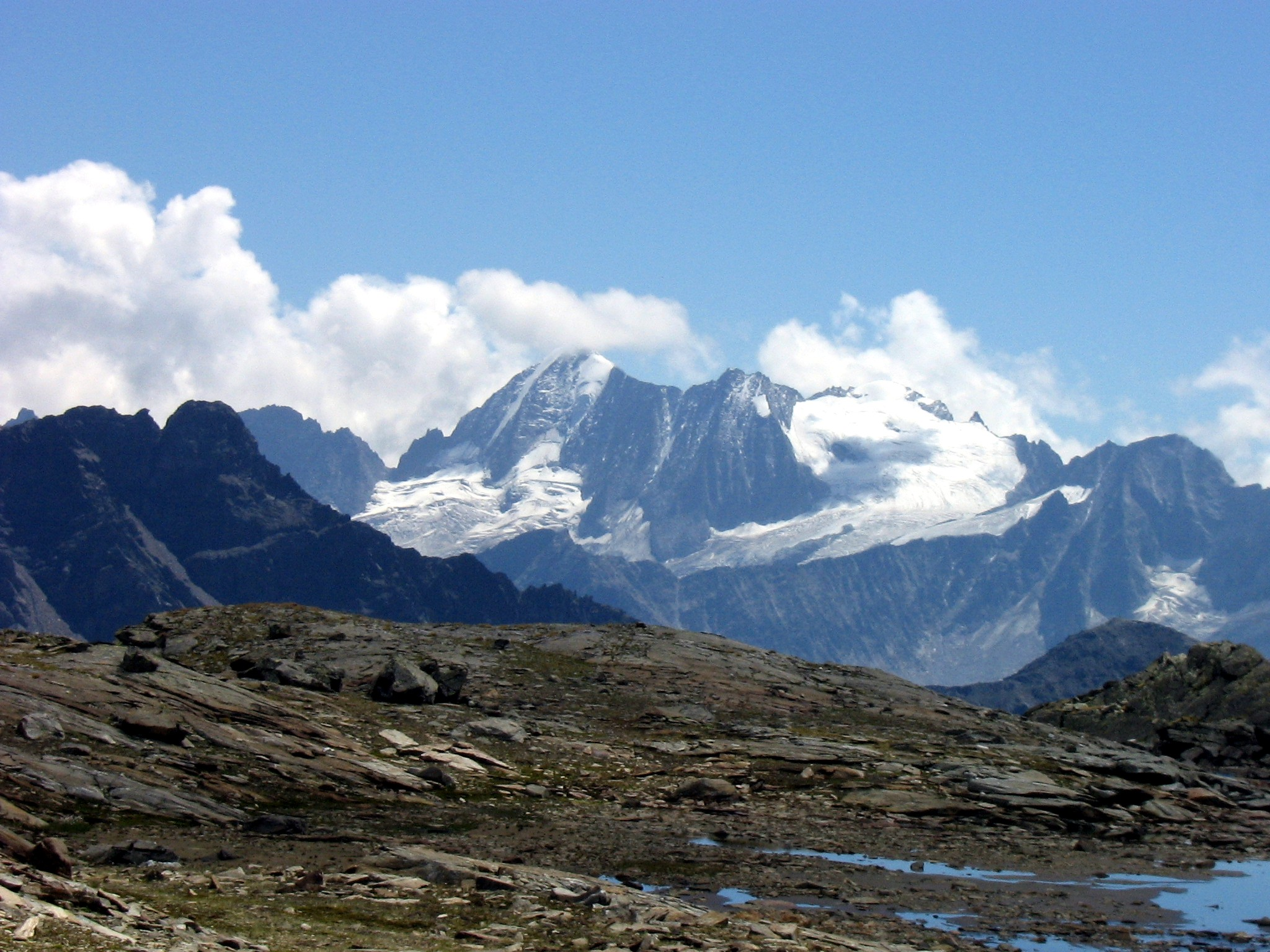
- Presanella seen from Lake Ercavallo near Ponte di Legno

Highest point
- Elevation: 3,558 m (11,673 ft)
- Prominence: 1,676 m (5,499 ft)
- Parent peak: Piz Bernina
- Listing: Ultra; Alpine mountains above 3000 m
- Coordinates: 46°13′12″N 10°39′50″E

Geography
- Location within Alps
- Location: Trentino, Italy
- Parent range: Adamello-Presanella

Climbing
- First ascent: August 27, 1864 by François Devouassoud, Bortolo Delpero, Melville Beachcroft, James D. Walker, and Douglas William Freshfield

Presanella is the highest mountain in the Adamello-Presanella range of the Italian Alps of northern Italy. Presanella has an elevation of 3,558 meters and is located in the Adamello Brenta National Park within the Trentino province of Italy.

== Climbing history ==
Presanella may have first been climbed by surveyors in 1854. Eduard Pechmann's 1865 Notizen zur Höhen- und Profilkarte has Presanella's height with two digits precision (1878.26 Viennese Klaster or 3,562.1 m), which in this list indicated that a measurement was taken from the summit during the trigonometric survey, which for Presanella was done in 1854. This possible ascent is otherwise unrecorded.

In 1862, the Viennese jurist de:Anton von Ruthner and the guides Kuenz from Martell and Delpero from Vermiglio ascended the 3043 m Passo di Cercen to the West of Presanella. They attempted the western summit (Cima di Vermiglio, 3458 m), then considered the highest by the people from Vermiglio, but failed to reach the summit, partly because Delpero did not have glacier experience. The first well-recorded ascent was two years later by François Devouassoud accompanied by Delpero and guiding the English gentlemen R. Melville Beachcroft, James Douglas Walker, and Douglas William Freshfield. Like Ruthner, the party approached Presanella from Vermiglio from the North to the Passo di Cercen and then crossed to the 3375 m pass now known as “Sella di Freshfield” and via the upper part of the Vedretta di Nardis over the west slope to the summit. Only three weeks later, on 17 September 1864, the Austrian explorer Julius Payer and his guide Girolamo Botteri stood on the summit, finding there to their surprise and disappointment a cairn built by Freshfield's party. Payer, Botteri and a second guide (either one Bertoldi or Giovanni Caturani, who gave up before the summit) had approached the mountain from the opposite side, starting in the Rocchetta valley, and climbing the Southeast ridge in a storm.

The first people to ascend Presanella over the steep North side were Johann “Kederbacher” Grill and Bonifacio Nicolussi guiding Bruno Wagner and Edward Kratky. On 4 August 1881, over a period of 13 hours, they climbed over the Presanella glacier to the Bocca di Presanella and ascended the Northeast ridge. The first ascent over the 550 m North face was by the Aostan climbers Emilio Brocherel, Ugo Croux and P. Arici in 1906.

== See also ==
- List of mountains of the Alps
- List of Alpine peaks by prominence
