= Alfred Krauss =

Alfred Krauss may refer to:

- Alfred Krauss (gymnast), French gymnast
- Alfred Krauss (officer), Austro-Hungarian officer

== See also ==
- Alfredo Kraus, Spanish tenor
