= Imperial and Royal Infantry =

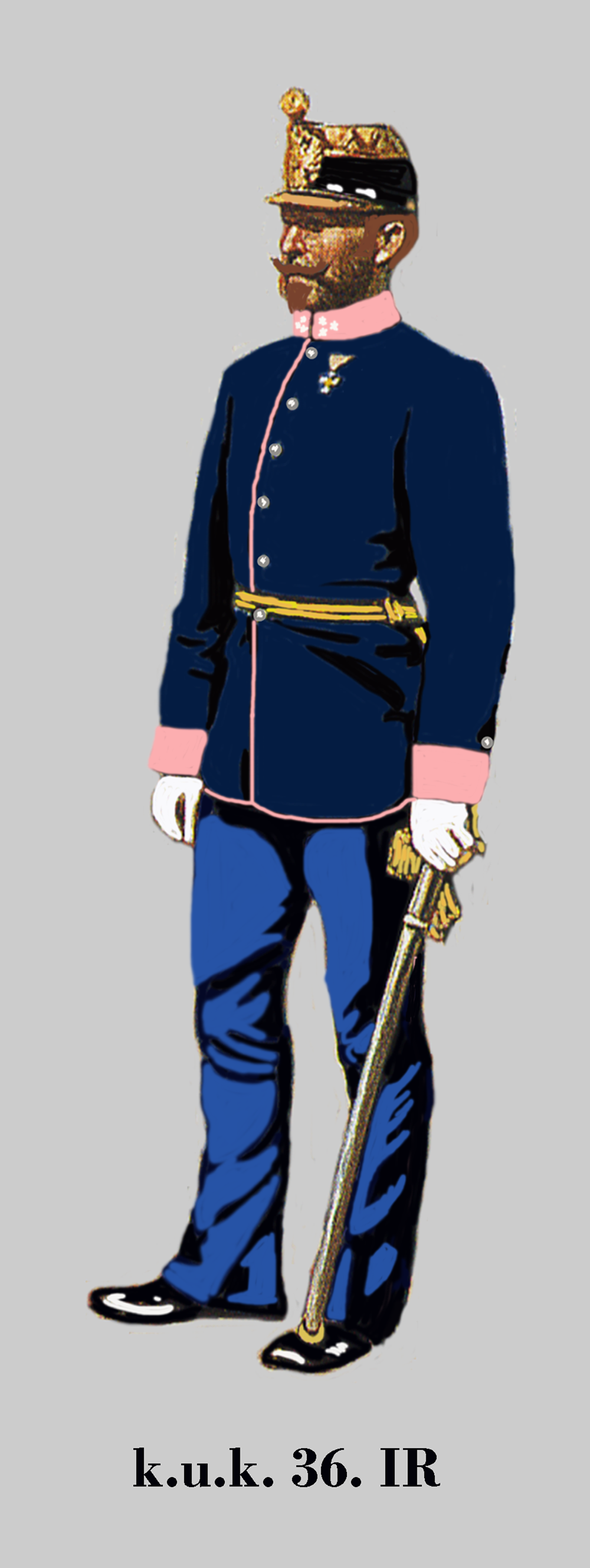
Captain of 36th k.u.k. Infantry in parade dress

The Imperial and Royal Infantry (German: k.u.k. Infanterie) was an arm of the Common Army of the Austro-Hungarian monarchy and comprised two elements:

- the German regiments that recruited from those kingdoms and lands represented in the Austrian Reichsrat (the territory known as Cisleithania)
- the Hungarian regiments, whose personnel came from the Kingdom of Hungary (including the former Principality of Transylvania and the Voivodeship of Serbia and Banat of Temeschvar), as wel as from the Kingdom of Croatia-Slavonia and the City of Fiume, the so-called Lands of the Crown of Saint Stephen (also known as Transleithania).

== Organization ==
In its entirety the k.u.k. Infantry consisted of the following:

- 62 "German" infantry regiments
- 40 "Hungarian" infantry regiments
- 4 regiments of Bosnian-Herzegovinian Infantry
- 28 rifle (Feldjäger) battalions
- 1 Bosnian-Herzegovinian Feldjäger battalion
- 4 regiments of Tyrolean rifles (Tiroler Jäger)

According to the organizational regulations for the k.u.k. infantry in 1895, each of the 102 infantry regiments in peacetime was structured as follows:

- Regimental headquarters (Regimentsstab)
- Four field battalions
- Sixteen field companies
- A reserve battalion cadre

Peacetime establishment of an infantry regiment:
| one colonel (Oberst) as the Commanding Officer (Regimentskommandant) | four field officers (Stabsoffiziere) as battalion commanders (Bataillonskommandanten) |
| one field officer and two captains z.b.V. (Hauptleute z.b.V.) | five regimental or senior doctors |
| one regimental adjutant (Regimentsadjutant) | four battalion adjutants (subalterns) (Bataillonsadjutanten (Subalternoffiziere)) |
| one sapper officer (Pionieroffizier) | one supply officer (a subaltern) (Proviantoffizier) |
| one paymaster (commissioned officer) (Rechnungsführer, Oberoffizier) | two corporal clerks (Rechnungshilfsarbeiter, Korporalsrang) |
| one gunsmith (Büchsenmacher) | 21 officers' batmen (Offiziersdiener) |
Regimental band
| one bandmaster (field officer) (Stabsführer) | one regimental drummer (Regimentstambour), |
| one battalion drummer | four battalion buglers (Bataillonshornisten) |
| one sergeant (Feldwebel), four corporals (Korporale), | five lance corporals (Gefreite), 30 privates (Mannschaften), two apprentices (Eleven) |
| Total: 21 officers, 73 NCOs and men |
| In the companies |
| 16 captains | 48 subalterns |
| 16 ensigns (Fähnriche) | 16 sergeants |
| 16 pay NCOs | 32 lance sergeants (Zugsführer), |
| 96 corporals | 96 lance corporals |
| 1,120 private soldiers | 64 batmen |
| 16 company buglers | 16 company drummers |
| Total: 64 officers, 2,488 NCOs and men |
Reserve battalion cadre:
in the HQ
| a major as commander | two recruiting officers |
| a regimental or senior doctor |
| a paymaster (commissioned officer) | three corporal clerks |
| one Stabsführer | one gunsmith |
in the main body
| one captain | one subaltern |
| two pay NCOs | one corporal |
| six private soldiers | 2 batmen |
Total: seven officers, 24 NCOs and men

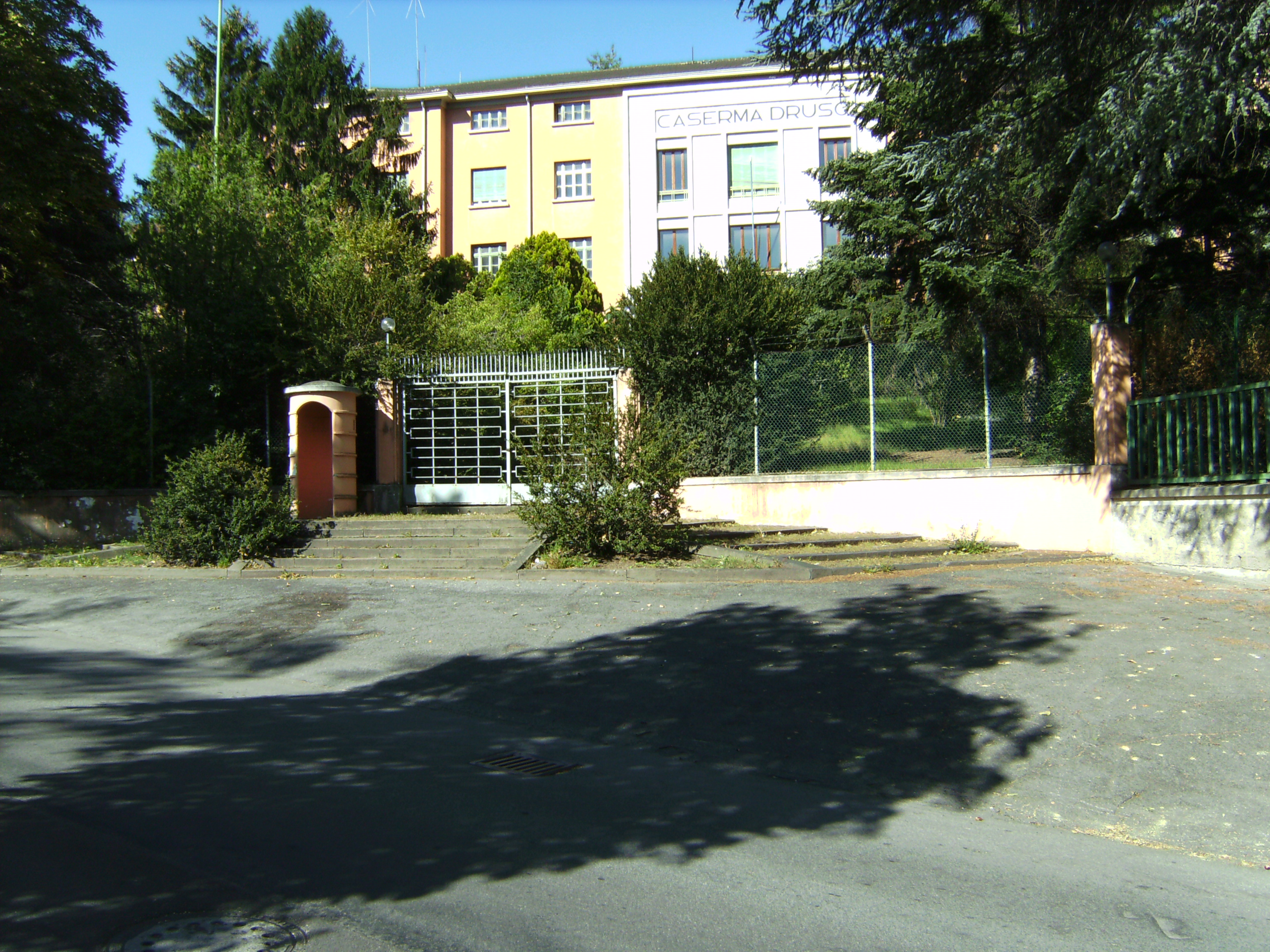
Former barracks of I Bn, 28th Infantry, in Schlanders

== Side arms ==
In the k.u.k. Infantry the following soldiers carried a sabre as a side arm:

Officers carried the infantry officer's sabre, which was 82 cm long and had a hollow grind on both sides. At the tip the blade was double-edged. The scabbard was made of brass and fitted with a sharpening iron (Schleifeisen). Two iron suspension rings were fastened to the scabbard in order to hang it from the sword belt. The sabre was always carried buckled underneath. The sword knot of the sabre was made of gold thread and consisted of a tassel and strap. The tassel was made of dangling knots (Bouillons) that were gold on the outside and black inside. This sabre was carried by ensigns and orderly sergeants (dienstführenden Feldwebeln).

Paymasters, field officers and members of the regimental band carried the M 1861 infantry sword as a melee weapon. This was 65.8 cm long and carried in a leather scabbard. NCOs carried this sabre with an NCO's sword knot which was made of imperial yellow and black wood. The tassel was immediately below it.

Battalion and company drummers, battalion buglers, stretcher bearers, bandage carriers (Bandagenträger) and wagon drivers (Fahrsoldaten) carried the M 1862 engineer sabre.

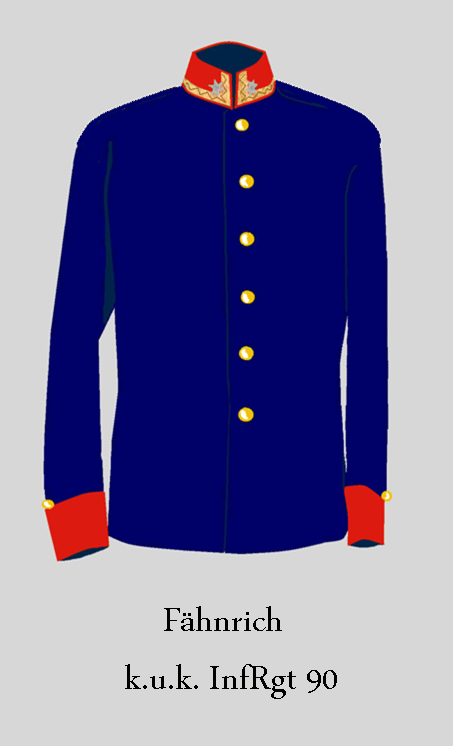
Ensign German infantry (facings: amaranth red)

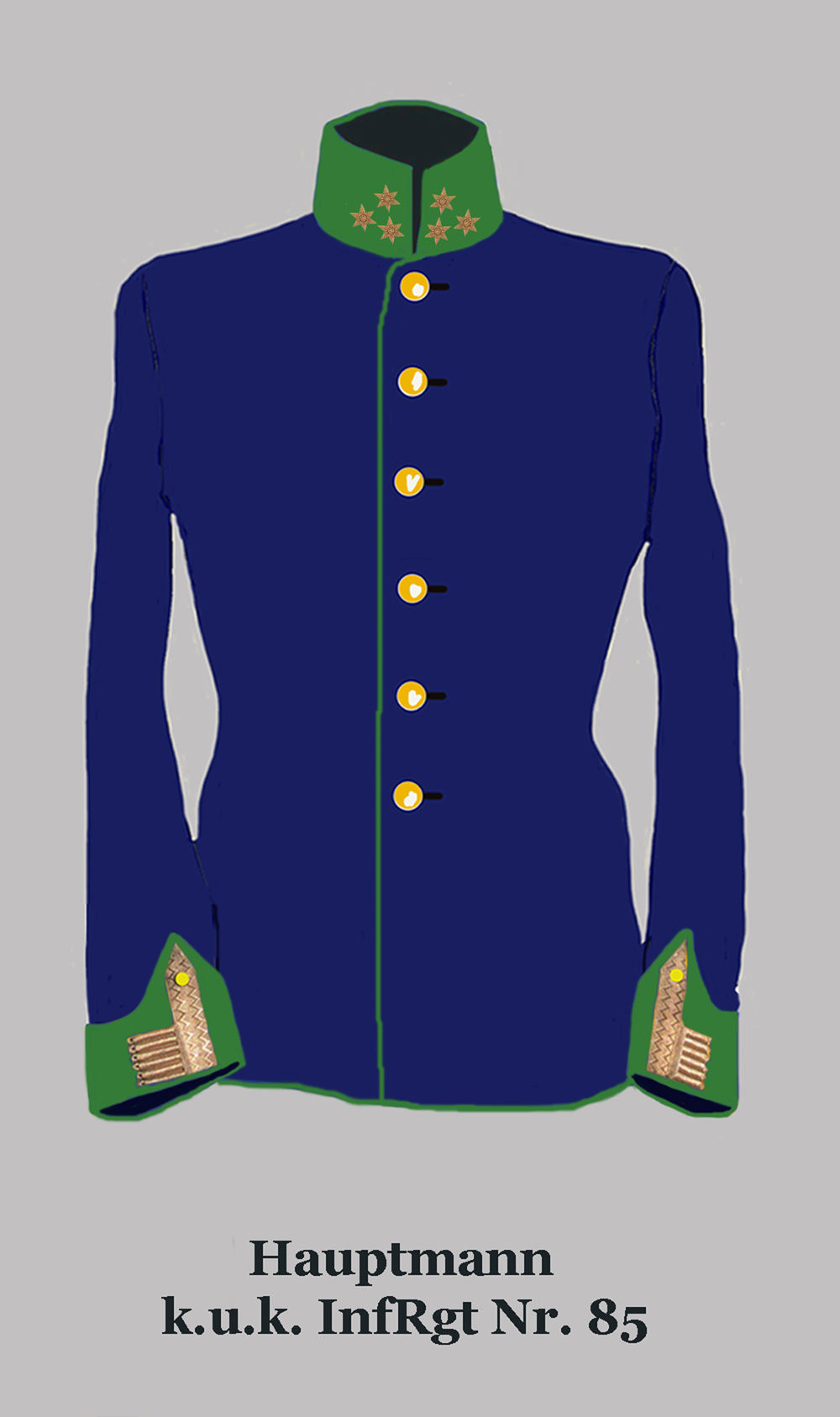
Captain Hungarian infantry (facings:apple green)

== Dress ==
=== Soldiers' peacetime parade dress ===
Soldiers and NCOs wore parade dress or ceremonial headwear (Paradekopfbedeckung) and frock coats (Waffenrock). In summer the coat was only worn when ordered. Depending on the weather it was either carried en bandouilère (i.e. rolled and slung over the shoulder) or worn. In winter it was always worn. Bread bags and field implements were not carried.

In the field, soldiers wore the so-called marching order (Marschadjustierung), i.e. they wore a field cap (Feldkappe) instead of the ceremonial hat and a field shirt (Feldbluse) instead of the frock coat. In summer the coat was worn en bandouilère, in rainy weather and in winter it was put on. Other orders of dress (e.g. mountain dress) were worn by order or in special circumstances.

=== Officers parade dress ===
Parade headwear, frock coat, sash, all medals - but without the ribbons of the grand crosses. When marching off on parade with the troops, in their order of dress, but only with coats if these were worn by the troops. Mounted officers without saddle bags and revolvers. If the troops were wearing their coats en bandouilère, mounted officers must strap their coats to the saddle. In full dress, as on parade, as ordered with or without sashes and ribbons on the grand crosses.

In the field officers had to wear the same uniform as the soldiers (except that mounted officers wore it breeches).

== Sources ==
- k.u.k. Kriegsministerium (ed.): Dislokation und Einteilung des k.u.k Heeres, der k.u.k. Kriegsmarine, der k.k. Landwehr und der k.u. Landwehr ("Location and organization of the Imperial and Royal Army, Imperial and Royal Navy, Imperial-Royal Landwehr and Royal Hungarian Honved") in: Seidel's kleines Armeeschema - pub.: Seidel & Sohn, Vienna, 1914

== Literature ==
- Austrian State Archives/War Archives in Vienna (Adjustierungsvorschrift für das k.u.k. Heer, II. Teil, Wien 1911)
- Glenn Jewison, Jörg C. Steiner: The Austro-Hungarian Land Forces 1848-1918
- Papers by the Museum of Military History in Vienna (Militärwissenschaftliches Institut) Vol. 10 Das k.u.k. Heer ("The Imperial and Royal Army"). Leopold Stocker Verlag, Graz, 1997
