= Vladimir Kondić =

Serbian general

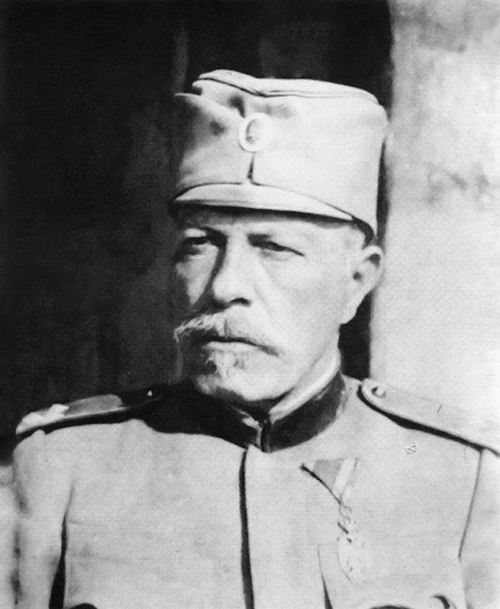
- Kondić during the First Balkan War
- Born: April 23, 1863; Belgrade, Principality of Serbia
- Died: May 27, 1940 (aged 77); Belgrade, Yugoslavia
- Burial place: Belgrade New Cemetery, Belgrade, Serbia
- Military career
- Allegiance: Principality of Serbia; Kingdom of Serbia
- Branch: Armed forces of the Principality of Serbia; Royal Serbian Army
- Service years: 1885 – 1915
- Conflicts: Serbo-Bulgarian War; First Balkan War; Second Balkan War; World War I: Srem Offensive

Vladimir Kondić (April 24, 1863 – May 27, 1940) was a 20th-century Serbian general. He is notable for his participation in the Serbo-Bulgarian War, First Balkan War, Second Balkan War and the First World War.

== Biography ==
=== Early life ===
He was born on April 24, 1863, in Belgrade. He is a descendant of Konda Bimbaša, Karađorđe's comrade-in-arms from the First Serbian Uprising. He finished elementary school and seven grades of high school in Belgrade. He enrolled in the lower school of the military academy in 1883 as part of the 16th class, and ended with a break due to the war with Bulgaria, on September 12, 1886. Of the ten graduated cadets of this class, he was third in rank. He attended the Academy's high school from 1888 (2nd class). He finished 1890, as the tenth in the rank of nineteen cadets. He spent time between March 1891 and 1892 as a state cadet in Russia, serving in the 7th Grenadier Regiment. He married Anna Walter (1879-1961), the daughter of the famous industrialist Adolf Walter. He had two daughters, Jelena (1907–1962) and Mara (1909–1991). He was grazed with the medical brigadier general Aleksandar Markovic.

=== Officers Promotion ===
As a cadet of the Military Academy, he was promoted to the rank of lieutenant on November 12, 1885. He became a lieutenant in February 1890. He was promoted to the rank of Captain of the 2nd Class on April 26, 1893, became Captain of the 1st Class on August 2, 1895, Major on May 14, 1898, Lieutenant Colonel on February 22, 1903, Colonel on August 16, 1908, and General on November 12, 1913. He became a divisional general on 26 August 1930.

=== Military service ===
In the Serbo-Bulgarian War, as an unfinished cadet of the Academy, he was on duty in the headquarters of the 2nd Infantry Regiment. After the war he held various positions - he was a naval officer in the 7th Battalion, and from April 1890. He became a teacher at the Infantry Non-Commissioned Officer School. Between 1892 and 1896 he was a company commander in the institution. Then, from March 1896 until March of the following year, he was the adjutant of two military ministers: General Dragutin Franasović and Jovan Mišković. He was returned from that duty in the troupe, first as an acting duty officer, and then as the commander of the 1st Battalion of the 6th Regiment. In March 1897, with the corps command, he became the acting commander of the infantry non-commissioned officer school. He held this position until March 1900 when he became acting commander of the 1st Infantry Regiment. In the same year, he was appointed adjutant of Alexander I. He remained in that position until April 1902 . From January 31, 1903, he was a deputy in the Examination Commission for the rank of major. The May Coup and found him in the position of acting commander of the 8th Regiment. On the day of the coup, he was relieved of his duties and made available. Over the next two months, he changed two command positions. He was first appointed Commander of the 11th Regiment, and soon afterwards Commander of the 3rd Regiment. At the beginning of July 1903, he was appointed assistant commander of the Drina divisional area. He remained in this position for a long time until the beginning of the Balkan wars.

=== Balkan Wars ===
In the First Balkan War, he commanded the Timok Division of the 1st Call, as part of the 2nd Army of General Stepo Stepanović. The task of this division was to support the work of the 1st Army and to act on the side of the Ottoman Army. The Division took Kriva Palanka on October 7 and on October 9, Kratovo. After persistent fighting, on October 12, it captured Crni Vrh, which was defended by the 43rd Regiment of the Turkish Army. This regiment decisively played the support of its Vradar army and contributed to the fact that the Vardar army did not experience a complete defeat by the Serbian army in the Battle of Kumanovo. From these positions, the Timok Division of the 1st call was sent with the Danube Division of the 2nd call and heavy artillery to help the Bulgarians near Jedren. Under the command of Vladimir Kondic and in cooperation with the Bulgarian Army, the Timok Division accelerated the fall of Jedren on March 13, 1913.

The Second Balkan War found Colonel Kondic in the same position. The Timok division was located in the vicinity of Pirot. From these positions, he managed to keep the penetration of General Rache Petrov's 3rd Bulgarian Army and thus contribute to a favorable outcome of the war. For his services in both of these wars, Vladimir Kondić was promoted to the rank of general on November 12, 1913. Between the Balkans and the First World War, he was the commander of the newly formed Vardar divisional area.

=== World War I ===
In the First World War from mobilization until August 25, 1914, General Kondic again commanded the Timok Division of the 1st Call, which remained part of General Stepo Stepanovic's 2nd Army. Being at the beginning of the Battle of Cer in the strategic reserve, the Timok Division of the 1st Call was used only on the last day of that battle and with its successful action in the immediate vicinity of Marjanović Vis, where the situation of the 2nd Army was most critical, forced the enemy to withdraw. After the successful victory in the Battle of Cer, the 2nd Army was ordered to commence the Srem Offensive, to force Sava with a demonstration near Mitrovica and tried to free her. Commander Kondić took all measures to perform the task assigned to him. After crossing near Chevrntija, on September 6, 1914, his exhausted and insufficiently equipped soldiers suddenly faced a superior enemy. One and a half of his regiments managed to cross to the left bank; however, scarcity in pontoons and the material from the bridges prevented the other troops from being transferred. The transferred troops remained on the left side and were left to the enemy. After a one-day battle, the Timok division suffered a heavy defeat, followed by great human and material losses. Although defeated in the tactical and technical sense, the Timok Division won in the strategic sense. By attracting significant enemy forces, it facilitated the work of the 1st Army after the crossing to Srem. In addition, it gave the enemy unprecedented resistance, which was pointed out by the commander of the 29th enemy division, General Alfred Kraus. After this failure, General Kondic was relieved of his duties and made available.

=== Later years ===
Due to the failure of the Battle of Chevrntija, General Vladimir Kondic was not allowed to express his command abilities until the end of the war. During the fighting, his command was taken away in 1915 as well as being placed under military court. He retired the same year at his own request. He was also convicted for the trial at Chevrntija. After the First World War, at a repeated trial on October 14, 1920, by the decision of the military court s.br. 5658, Kondić was acquitted of all charges, pardoned and fully rehabilitated. He was transferred to the reserve by promotion to a higher rank on August 26, 1930 . years. As the only cadet of the 16th class of the Military Academy, he lived to a very old age.

He died on May 27, 1940. He was buried in the Belgrade New Cemetery.

For his merits, both in peace and in war, General Kondić was decorated with numerous domestic and foreign decorations.

== Awards ==
- Order of Karađorđe's Star, 4th Order with Swords
- Order of the White Eagle, 4th and 5th order
- Order of the Cross of Takovo, 4th and 5th order
- Order of the Yugoslav Crown, 3rd Order
- Medal of military virtues

=== Foreign Awards ===
Kingdom of Greece: Order of the Redeemer, 3rd order

== Bibliography ==
- Milić Milićević; Ljubodrag Popović (2003). Generali Vojske Kneževnine i Kraljevine Srbije. Vojnoizdavački zavod. pp. 207–212. ISBN 978-86-335-0142-2.
- Bjelajac, Mile S. (2004). Generali i admirali Kraljevine Jugoslavije 1918—1941. Institut za noviju istoriju Srbije, Beograd. p. 263. ISBN 978-86-7005-039-6.
