= Kaiserjäger =

Regiments in the Common Army of Austria-Hungary

The Kaiserjäger, officially designated by the Imperial and Royal (k.u.k.) military administration as the Tiroler Jäger-Regimenter or "Tyrolean Rifle Regiments", were formed in 1895 as four normal infantry regiments within the Common Army of Austria-Hungary. Despite the name "Tirol" in its title its members were not just recruited from the crown land of Tyrol (including Vorarlberg) but also from other parts of the monarchy. The regiments were disbanded in 1918 with the end of the k.u.k. monarchy. The word Jäger (meaning "hunter" or "huntsman") is a characteristic term used for light infantry or light infantrymen in a German-speaking context.

== Background ==
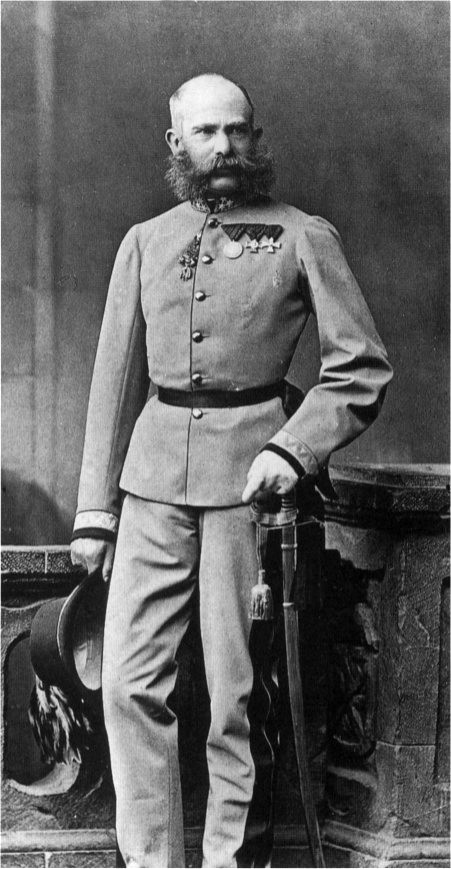
Emperor Franz Joseph I in the parade dress of the Rifles

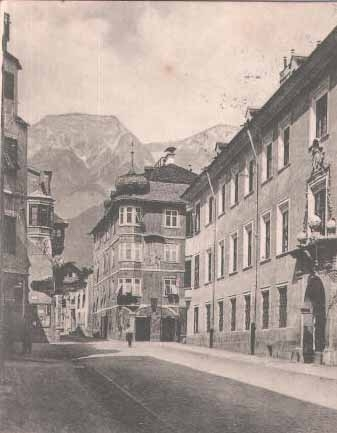
Kaiserjäger barracks in Hall in Tirol

The first standing troops in the Tyrol were the native Tyrolese soldiers of the Tyrolean State Battalion (Tiroler Landbataillon) formed in 1703. This was superseded in 1745 by the Tyrolean Field and State Regiment (Tiroler Feld- und Landregiment), which was given the status and prerogatives of an imperial regiment and went under the regimental number 46. Due to the political situation during the Napoleonic era, the regiment was permanently stationed in Veneto – still Austrian at that time – in 1801, which is why it lost its original name.

As its successor in Tyrol, the 64th Tyrolean Rifles (Tiroler Jägerregiment Nr. 64) was established, based on a Tyrolean rifle corps and the battalion of Kurz'schen Jäger ("Kurz's Rifles"). When Tyrol fell to the Kingdom of Bavaria in 1805, the name Tyrolean Rifles was withdrawn. After the return of Tyrol to the Austrian Empire in 1814, the reorganization of a Tyrolean rifle corps was immediately begun. Initially it consisted of one battalion, but was later expanded to three. The inhaber of the Rifles was Feldmarschall-Leutnant Franz Philipp Fenner von Fenneberg (1762–1824), which resulted in the contemporary title of Fennerjäger.

== Founding of the regiment ==
In spring 1815, Emperor Francis I directed the establishment of a Kaiser-Jäger-Regiment of four battalions and 16 companies. The formation of this regiment began on 16 Jan 1816. By contrast with the Jäger troops of Old Austria that were organized into independent Feldjäger battalions (k.u.k. Feldjäger), this new regiment was the only (Imperial and Royal) Jäger regiment of the Empire of Austria until 1895 (when the "Great Regiment of Tyrolean Emperor Rifles", or Großen Regiments der Tiroler Kaiserjäger, was split up.

The soldiers of this regiment, whose strength was 5,000 men, were recruited by state conscription (Konscription) - until the introduction of general conscription (Wehrpflicht) in 1868, their posts were determined by lot - and by the absorption of 1,400 men from the former Fennerjägerkorps and of 600 Tyrolean soldiers who returned to their homeland after the end of the Napoleonic Wars. Initially conscription service was for 12 years; later, this was reduced to 8 years and then 6 years, the pay of the soldiers being commensurate with length of service.

== Organisational changes ==
For 33 years the organization of the regiment remained unchanged until, in 1849, it was restructured into six battalions of four companies and one battalion of six companies. In 1859 an additional 8th battalion was established. In 1863, another reorganization followed; from now on the regiment had six battalions, each of six companies, and a depot battalion, from which a seventh battalion was supposed to be created in time of mobilization.

After the introduction of general conscription (Wehrpflicht) in 1868 the regiment comprised seven battalions, seven reserve companies and a battalion recruiting cadre. In 1880 the regiment was brought up to a strength of ten battalions by the allocation of disbanded Feldjäger battalions.

By 1 May 1895, the strength had been further raised to 16 battalions by the allocation of soldiers from the Feldjäger corps and the Regiment had been divided into four Jäger regiments, each of four battalions. The newly formed regiments were given the designation "1st (2nd, 3rd or 4th) Imperial and Royal Tyrolean Rifles (Kaiserjäger)" or Kaiserliches und königliches 1., 2., 3., und 4. Tiroler-Jäger-Regiment "Kaiserjäger".

The Emperor himself was the Regimental Colonel (or Inhaber); his second-in-command (Zweitinhaber) and the commanding officers were personally appointed by him.

== Structure ==
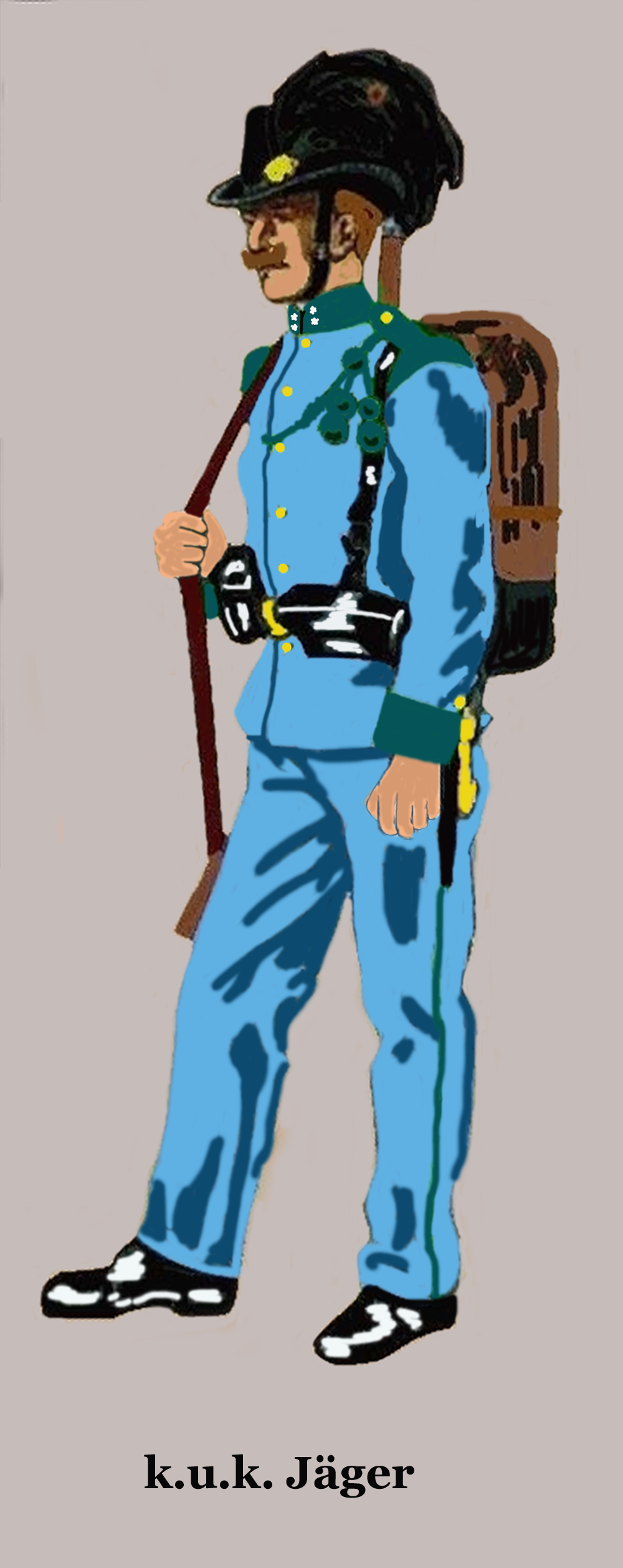
A Kaiserjäger in parade dress

On 1 May 1895 the 16 battalions of the Tyrolean Jäger Regiment (Emperor Franz Joseph) (Tiroler Jägerregiment Kaiser Franz Joseph) were directed to form into 4 regiments that were set up as follows:

- 1st Rifles with its HQ, II, III and IV Battalions in Innsbruck, I Battalion in Bregenz
- 2nd Rifles with its HQ, I, II and IV Battalions in Vienna, III Battalion in Brixen
- 3rd Rifles with its HQ, III and IV Battalions in Trient, I Battalion in Reiff am Gartsee, II Battalion in Rofreit
- 4th Rifles with its HQ, II, III and IV Battalions in Lienz, I Battalion in Hall in Tirol

As a result of the usually frequent moves of the garrisons in Austria-Hungary, the units (official abbreviation TJR for Tyrolean Jäger Regiment) were based in the following towns and cities of the three Tyrolean regions (North, South and Welsch Tyrol) in August 1914:

- 1st Rifles
  HQ, I, II and IV Battalions in Trient
  III Battalion and Recruit Battalion Cadre in Innsbruck (Klosterkaserne)
- Commanding Officer: Colonel Guido Novak von Arienti

Field officers: Lieutenant Colonel Paul Gschliesser – Major August Preindlsberger – Major Guido Blaas – Major Emanuel Leuprecht – Major Maximilian Ritter Barth von Barthenau – Major Friedrich Fössl

- 2nd Rifles
  HQ, I and II Battalions in Bozen
  III Battalion in Meran
  IV Battalion and Recruit Battalion Cadre in Brixen
- Commanding Officer: Colonel Alexander Brosch von Aarenau

Field officers: Lieutenant Colonel Friedrich Kreschel Edler von Wittigheim – Lieutenant Colonel Viktor Freiherr von Schleinitz – Lieutenant Colonel Gerhard Scherrer – Lieutenant Colonel Theodor Ritter von Zeynik – Major Erbst Devarda – Major Johann Ritter von Bezard – Major Friedrich Graf Meraviglia-Crivelli
Feldkurat: Karl Drexel

- 3 Rifles
  HQ, II, III and IV Battalions in Rofreit (Jägerkaserne)
  I Battalion and Recruit Battalion Cadre in Trient (Kaiserjägerkaserne)
  One company in Ala
- Commanding Officer: Colonel Heinrich Vonbank

Field officers: Lieutenant Colonel Johann Lercher – Lieutenant Colonel Josef Poletilović – Major Ignaz Fürmkranz – Major August Planiseig – Major Franz Bauer – Major Karl Köbe

- 4th Rifles
  HQ, II, III and IV Battalions in Riva
  I Battalion and Recruit Battalion Cadre in Hall in Tirol
- Commanding Officer: Colonel Ernst Dietrich

Field officers: Colonel Ludwig Abendorf – Lieutenant Colonel: Lorenz Covin – Lieutenant Colonel Rudolf Ritter von Kriegshaber – Lieutenant Colonel August Fischer vom See – Major Karl Kreiner – Major Varius Graf Levaulx Freiherr von Vrécourt

== Operational service ==
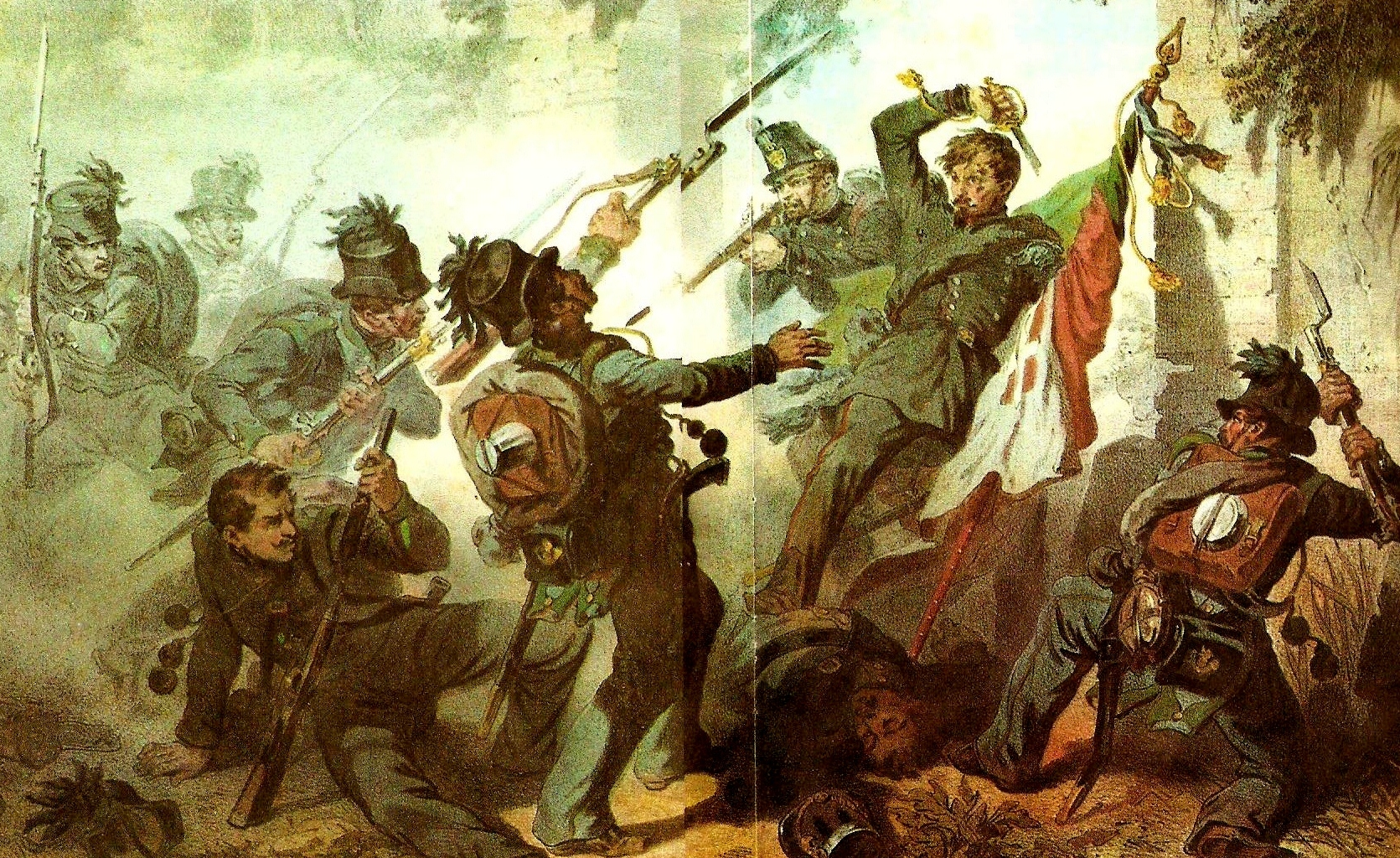
Kaiserjäger in the Battle of Novara (1849)

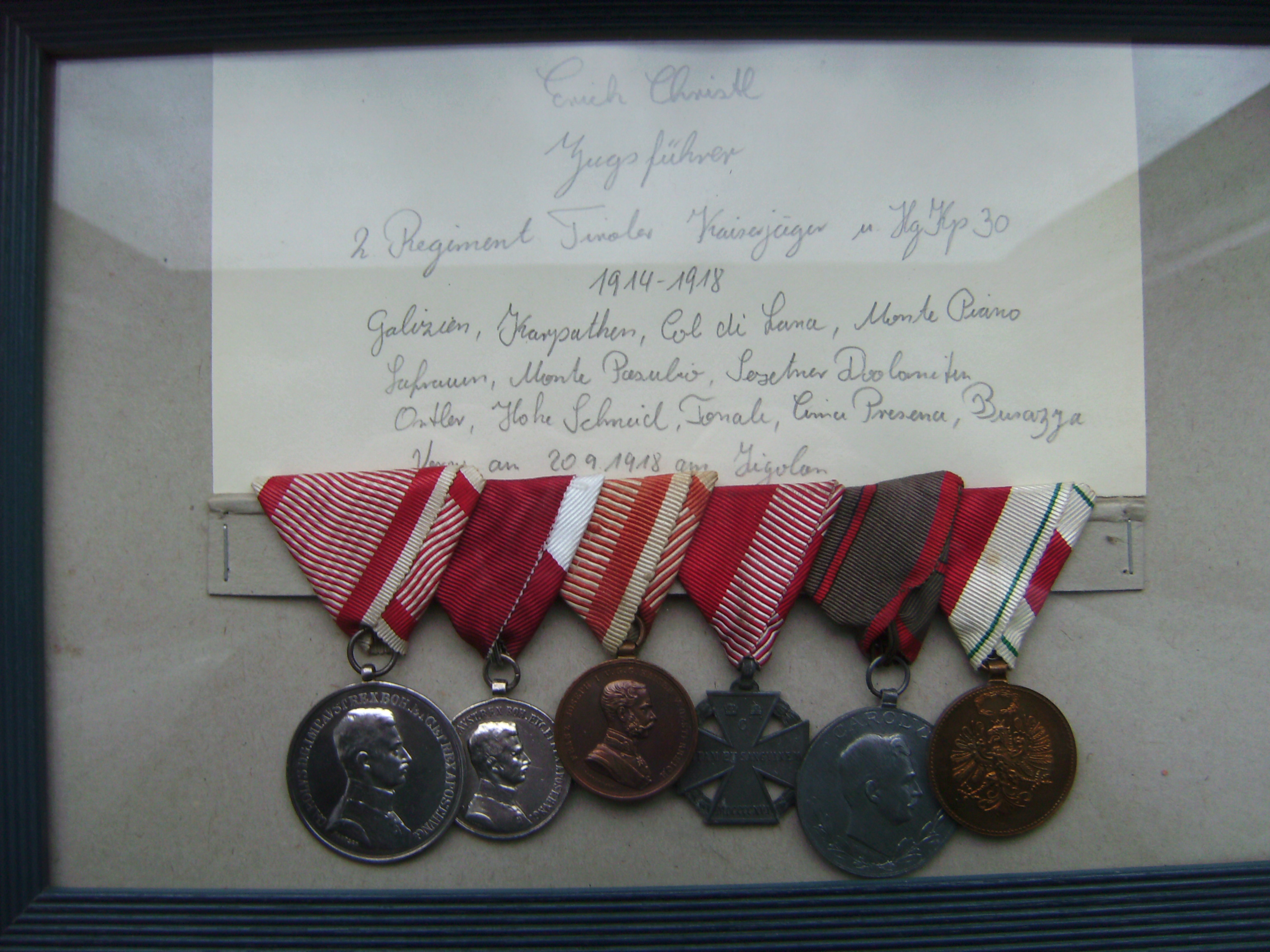
Medals of a Kaiserjäger

The Kaiserjäger saw operational service at the storming of Casina Fersada on 23 February 1849, the attack on the village of Pregasina on 16 June 1848, the night battle at Volta on 26 June 1848, capture of a French cannon on 4 June 1859 during the Battle of Magenta, the storming of Oliosi on 24 June 1866, and the storming of the insurgents' position in Kremenac on 21 October 1878 during the occupation of Bosnia and Herzegovina.

In addition to military combat operations, the Kaiserjäger were also involved in the expansion of military as well as civil infrastructure. They are reputed to have laid the Kaiserjägersteig road from Levico Terme (Löweneck) in the Sugana Valley in the 1870s and 1880s. that runs across the plateau of Lusern and the Seven Communities and ends at Malga Monterovere (1,255 m). During the First World War, the four regiments fought with heavy losses, first in Galicia and the Carpathians against Russia, until they were deployed on the plateau of the Seven Communities Trient and at Isonzo after the start of fighting on the Italian front.

The orders shown in the illustration and handwritten notes of a Kaiserjäger sergeant (Zugsführer) bear witness to the operations of the unit during the First World War:

This Kaiserjäger (later Alpine Company or, Hochgebirgs-Kompanie, No. 30) fought:

- in Galicia
- in the Carpathians
- at Col di Lana
- at Monte Piano
- on the plateau of the Seven Communities (Lafraun/Lavarone)
- at Monte Pasubio
- in the Sexten Dolomites
- at Ortler
- on the Hoher Schneid (Ortler Massif)
- at the Tonale Pass (Adamello – Presanella Massif)
- at the Cima Presena (Adamello – Presanella Massif)
- and at the Busazza (Adamello – Presanella Massif)

For that he was awarded the following honours:

- the Silver Medal for Bravery, 1st class
- the Silver Medal for Bravery, 2nd class
- the Bronze Medal for Bravery
- the Karl Troop Cross
- the Wound Medal for being wounded once (on 20 September 1918 at Zigolon – Adamello-Presanella)
- the Medal of Honour of the County of Tyrol to its defenders

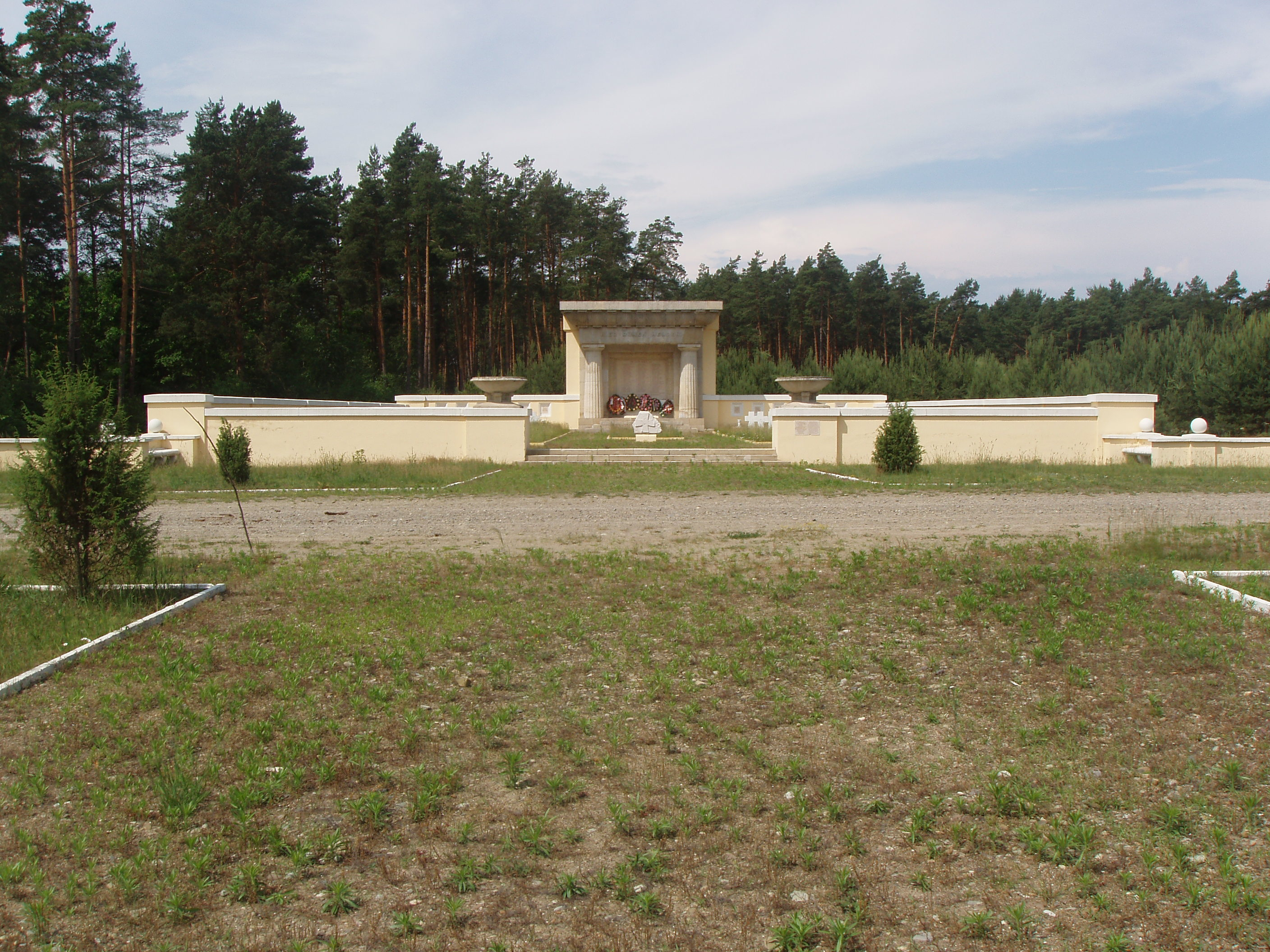
Kaiserjäger cemetery in Hijce/Ukraine near Rawa Ruska

The Kaiserjäger were not mountain troops, but regular infantry. These well-trained peacetime soldiers were regularly sacrificed during the campaign in Galicia and could not be replaced to the same extent. In the Gorlice–Tarnów Offensive the 2nd Rifles lost almost 80% killed, wounded and missing - on 2 and 3 May 1915 alone they lost 26 officers and about 600 NCOs and men. The 4th Rifles lost 1,300 men over these two days.

In the autumn of 1915, the Kaiserjäger and Landesschützen were transferred to the Italian Front in order to support the despairing Standschützen militia and small numbers of regular forces defending Italian attacks and to assist in stabilizing the front.

A higher percentage (about 40%) of the Kaiserjäger were soldiers from Trient (i.e. they were Welsch Tyrolese). The rest were made up of the Tyrolese and inhabitants from the rest of the monarchy. Despite the many Italian-speaking Jäger, there were hardly any desertions in the fighting against the Kingdom of Italy, although it had been assumed in Italy that their "brothers from the unconquered territories (irredenta) strive joyfully in the womb of their Mother Italia" (Gabriele D'Annunzio). All the greater was the disappointment when the men of Trentino showed no inclination to change sides. On the contrary, the following saying circulated among the Fanti (infantry) and Alpini in 1916: "Dio ci liberi degli irredenti!" ("God deliver us from the unsaved").

Because of the possibility of unrest the 2nd TJR was moved in 1916 with its garrison (and the recruit battalion cadre) to Beneschau in Bohemia.

== Dress ==
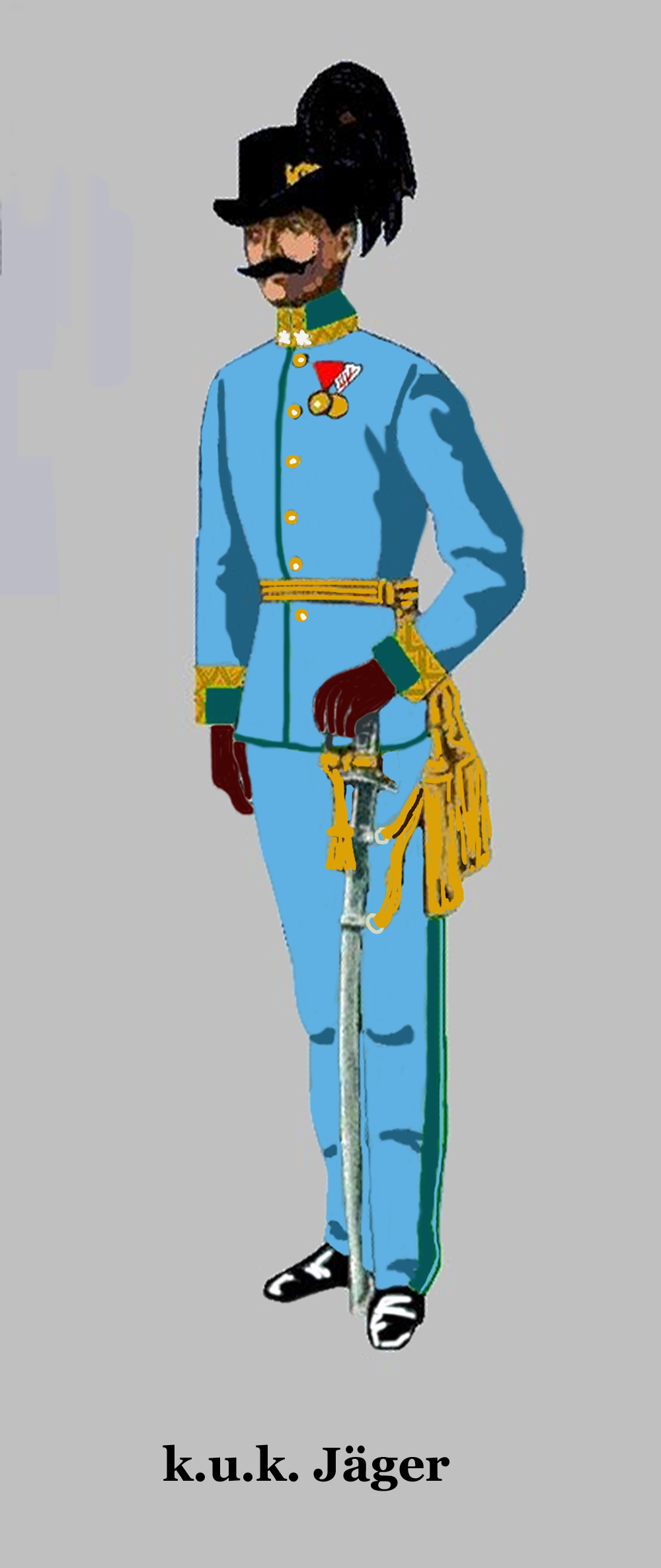
A Jäger major in parade dress. The "pike grey" of the uniform was actually of a greyer shade.

The uniforms of the Jäger units were the same, except in minor details. A hat made of matte black, waterproof felt served as the parade headdress. It consisted of a crown and brim adorned with a circular, green cord, the Jäger emblem and a plume of black rooster feathers. The hat cord was made of sheep's wool, and had a button and an acorn covered with a green wool. The two acorns were attached to the rear part of the crown. The cord for officers was made of black and gold thread.

The crown was in the shape of an oval cone, with a moderately sized dent in the top. The brim was flat in front and behind, but turned up at both sides. The edge of the brim was edged with black, lacquered calfskin.

On the left hand side of the crown was a rearward sloping pocket made of hat felt for attaching the feathers. The hat emblem - of gold coloured metal - consisted of the hunter's horn. In the centre of the coil, the Kaiserjäger troops had the Tyrolean eagle made of nickel-silver. This emblem was fastened above the hat feather pocket, such that the eagle was at the same angle as the plume. The plume was tied up in the form of a rooster tail on a 1.5 mm thick piece of iron wire. The length of the plume was 29 cm. The plume was inserted into the pocket on the hat, so that the feathers hung towards the rear in an arch.

On the march the Kaiserjäger wore the infantry field cap.

The tunic (Waffenrock) of the Jäger was – for officers and men – cut in the same style as the line infantry. The other ranks' coat was made of pike gray cloth and had grass-green epaulettes, shoulder trim, collar and cuffs. The buttons for all regiments were yellow and marked with the battalion number.

The short plain jackets worn by the Jägers for active service and ordinary duties, were of the same colour as the tunics with grass-green gorget patches to indicate their arm of service. Their remaining items of dress were no different from those of the ordinary infantry.

Trousers were of pike grey cloth and cut long in accordance with the regulations for German regiments. The trousers of the officers had grass-green lampasses; NCOs and other ranks had grass-green piping along the side seam.

=== Pike grey ===
Apart from the headdress, the most distinctive feature of the Kaiserjäger uniform was the base color of "pike grey" (Hechtgrau). This color (which was of a greyer shade than the light blue shown in illustrations on this page) had distinguished the jäger regiments of the Austrian (and subsequently Austro-Hungarian) armies from 1801 until 1915. In 1908 it had been adopted as the universal color of the new field service uniform adopted for most of the army except the cavalry, except for the cavalry.

== Kaiserjäger and Kaiserschützen ==
The Kaiserjäger were often confused with the Tyrolean Kaiserschützen, who belonged to the k.k. Landwehr, and were part of the regular armed forces of Austria-Hungary. The confusion arose from the decree of April 1917, in which Emperor Charles I granted the title Kaiserschützen to the Tyrolean state rifles. (The state rifles, known as Landesschützen or Kaiserschützen, were mountain troops and wore a different uniform.)

== Ranks ==
One curiosity of the rifle troops was that the private soldier was called a Jäger (rifleman, literally "hunter") whereas the lowest NCO's rank was that of Unterjäger (unter normally meaning "under" or "below").

== Monuments ==
Monuments to the fallen Kaiserjägers were erected in Bregenz and in the Innsbruck district of Amras during the First World War and in the interwar period. The Kaiserjäger monument in Bolzano, which was created by Karl Ernstberger in 1917/18 but not completed, was demolished by the Italian fascist regime in 1926/27 to make room for the Bolzano Victory Monument. The sculptures of the former Bolzano monument, which were designed by Franz Ehrenhöfer, can now be found at the Bergisel in Innsbruck.

== Tradition ==
In order to maintain the tradition of the Jäger, in 2000 the annual officer cadet intake at the Theresian Military Academy in Vienna's Neustadt was given the title Kaiserjäger. In 2004, the 82 graduates of the course joined the Austrian Armed Forces as professional officers.

== Literature ==
- Anton Graf Bossi-Fedrigotti: Kaiserjäger – Ruhm und Ende. Leopold Stocker Verlag, Graz, 1977
- E. Wißhaupt: Die Tiroler Kaiserjäger im Weltkrieg 1914–1918 (2 vols., 1935 and 1936)
- Generalmajor Kasimir Freiherr von Lütgendorf: Die historische Entwicklung des Landesverteidigungswesens, der Kaiserjäger und Landesschützen, Vienna, 1914
- Bernhard Wurzer: Tirols Heldenzeit, Innsbruck, 1959
- k.u.k. Kriegsministerium: „Dislokation und Einteilung des k.u.k Heeres, der k.u.k. Kriegsmarine, der k.k. Landwehr und der k.u. Landwehr“ in: Seidels kleines Armeeschema – pub.: Seidel & Sohn, Vienna, 1914
- Haager, Christian et al.: Tiroler Kaiserjägerbund: Tiroler Kaiserjäger seit 1816 – die Geschichte der Tiroler Eliteregimenter; Gründung – Einsätze – Ausrüstung / herausgegeben von Tiroler Kaiserjägerbund und Alt-Kaiserjägerclub Innsbruck; Innsbruck, 1991 and Cremona, 1996²
- Huter, Franz: Ein Kaiserjägerbuch 1 – Die Kaiserjäger und ihre Waffentaten. Innsbruck: self pub. by the Bergisel Museum, 1980
- Huter, Franz: Ein Kaiserjägerbuch 2 – Kurzgeschichte des Bergiselmuseums – Innsbruck: self pub. by the Bergisel Museum, 1985
- Jakoncig, Guido: Tiroler Kaiserjäger im Weltkrieg. – Innsbruck: Wagner, 1935
- Potschka, Ludwig: Geschichte des Tiroler Jäger-Regiments Kaiser Franz Joseph – Innsbruck: Wagner, 1885 (4 vols.)
- Raschin Edler von Raschinfels, Karl: Die Einser-Kaiserjäger im Feldzug gegen Rußland: 1914–1915; Extract from the diary of the regimental adjutants – edited by Karl Raschin Edler von Raschinfels; Bregenz: Teutsch, 1935.
- Schemfil, Viktor: Das k.u.k. 3. Regiment der Tiroler Kaiserjäger im Weltkriege 1914–1918 – edited by Viktor Schemfil based on the wartime documents of the regiments; Bregenz: Teutsch, 1926.
