= Srem Offensive =

Offensive by Serbian Army in WWI

- Part of Serbian campaign of World War I
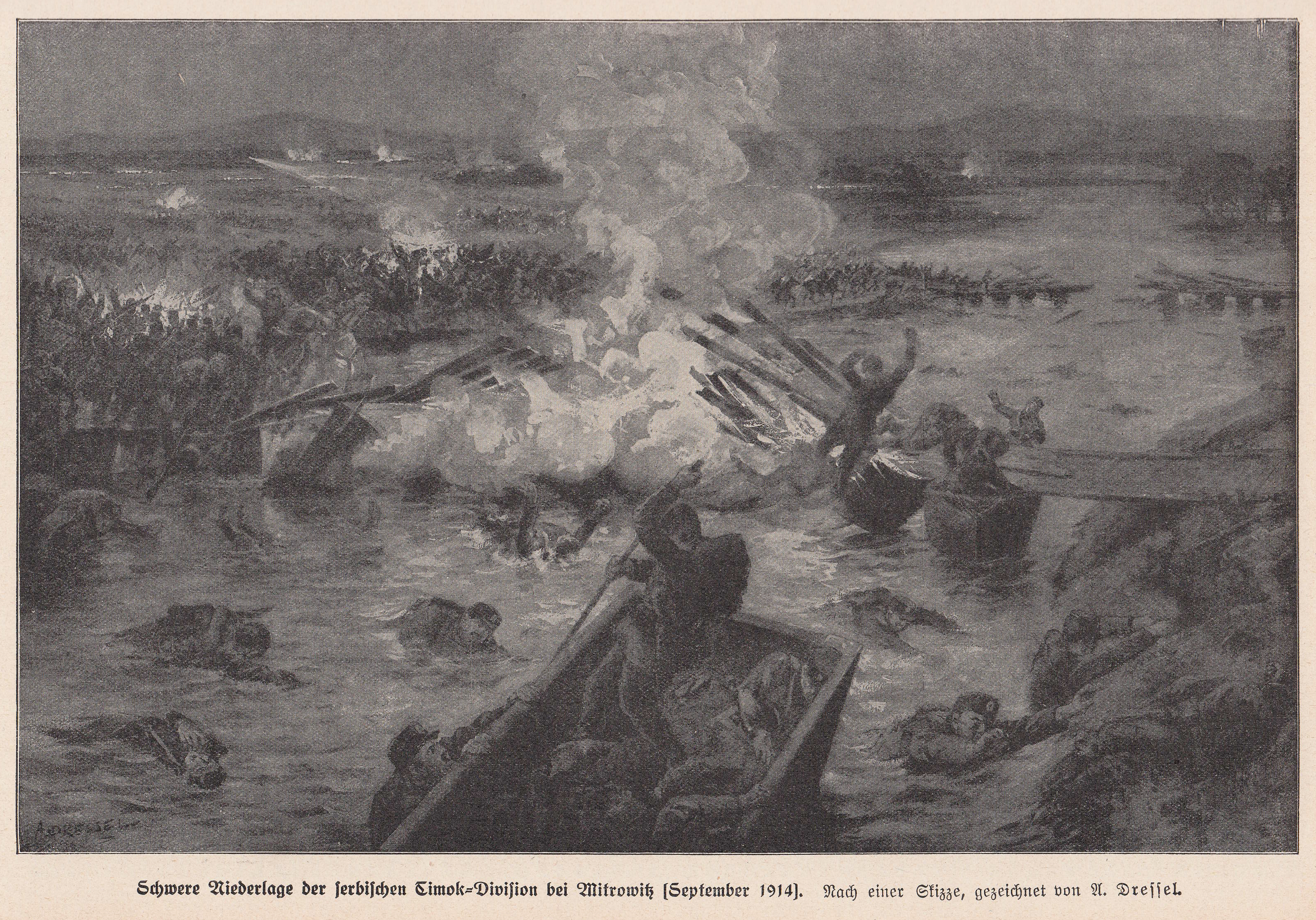
- "The defeat of the Serbian Timok division" by A. Dressel
Date	6–14 September 1914
Location	Srem, Austria-Hungary
Result	Austro-Hungarian victory

Belligerents
Serbia	Austria-Hungary

Commanders and leaders
(Kingdom of Serbia) Radomir Putnik; (Kingdom of Serbia) Stepa Stepanović; (Kingdom of Serbia) Vladimir Kondić	(Austria-Hungary) Alfred Krauss

Strength
Three divisions and the Braničevo detachment	Garrisons of Mitrovica and Jarak

Casualties and losses
6,000+ (Timok I attack only)	2,000+ (Timok I attack only)

The Srem Offensive was a limited offensive conducted by the Serbian 1st Army against Austria-Hungary during the early months of the Serbian campaign of World War I.

== Entente pressure for the offensive ==
From early August 1914, Russia and France pressured Belgrade to invade Austria-Hungary and divert troops from the Eastern and Western fronts. Despite Serbia's unpreparedness for even a defensive war, let alone an offensive, the pressure mounted as the three powers grew more tense. The Grand Duke Nikolai Nikolaievich even wrote a letter to Crown Prince Alexander urging him to attack. Serbian troops were armed with Russian rifles, and they wanted compensation. Belgrade resisted, claiming truthfully it could not attack.

Before the Battle of Cer, Serbian Prime Minister Nikola Pašić attempted to buy more time to prepare for the inevitable offensive his country would be forced into by informing the Russian Empire of his lack of pontoon bridges. He argued it would be impossible to carry out an offensive without crossing the Sava and Danube rivers. He also stated that his country lacked ammunition, saying both "were urgently needed in the interest of an offensive and crossing against Austria-Hungary." Serbia repeatedly requested bridging material from Russia but was refused. Chief of the Serbian General Staff, Field Marshal Putnik, advised Pašić to stall and promise Serbia would only attack once the troops were rearmed and sufficient bridging material was obtained. This was an intelligent plan, as it would take until at least early next year to achieve. However, the Allies refused to allow any more delay and ordered Serbia to attack. Pašić could not withstand the Entente any longer and told Putnik to invade in early September.

== Planning ==
On August 31, Putnik invited all the Serbian generals to plan a limited offensive into Hungarian crown lands. The plan was that the left and right flanks of the Army would attack, while the centre defended Serbia. The left, composing the Uzice army group, would attack west into Bosnia and push towards Sarajevo with Montenegrin troops as the right, composing the Serbian 1st Army, would attack into Srem (Syrmia), and ultimately push towards the massive fort of Petrovaradin. A diversion would be created by sending the Timok I division (in the Serbian 2nd Army) across the Sava, where it would draw Habsburg forces away from the 1st Army. Putnik viewed the operation as without much risk, as it would be easy for the Serbs to retreat in case of major enemy danger.

== Timok I division's crossing ==
From the outset, the diversion intended to be created by the Timok I division was a fiasco. Field marshal Stepa Stepanović had been told of the plans since August 31 but had not thought to tell General Vladimir Kondic, commander of the division, about them. Stepanović called Kondic half an hour later than was planned and told him to prepare the division to march. He did not inform Kondic about the planned crossing and told him to report to the 2nd Army headquarters on the evening of September 5. Kondic claimed that Timok I was ready to march at 5:00 AM and arrived at the HQ half an hour early. There, Stepanović finally told him about the crossing and invasion. He informed Kondic that Timok I would be reinforced by three squadrons of cavalry, the Mitrovac detachment, and some old fort artillery. Kondic took 3 hours to return to his division headquarters, and Timok I only marched at 11:00 AM. The destination of the crossing was 45 km from Timok I's position and was supposed to take 12 hours, which would put Timok I division in place at the right time to invade. Timok I did not arrive at the jump-off point until 11:50 PM on September 5, when Kondic informed Stepanović that Timok I was ready to cross the Sava River. However, little preparation had been made during the disorganized night march. Sick oxen had delayed the arrival of bridging material, and the first pontoon was not launched until 5:00 AM on the 6th.

Cetnik units crossed to establish a foothold, but the limited defenders on the bank put up fierce resistance and a bridgehead was only gained after two hours of heavy fighting. At 8:00 AM, Stepanović arrived and watched the Timok I division cross the river for two and a half hours. Timok I had crossed the river between two towns, Mitrovica and Yarak. Not only did these towns have small garrisons, but a full division commanded by Alfred Krauss was stationed in one of the towns. This would later prove to be fatal for the Timok I division.

Due to the time lost establishing a bridgehead, Kondic was anxious to make up time and advance. He neglected the bridgehead and did not fortify it since that would delay the division even more. Kondic ordered the 13th regiment to advance, but instead of aiming to capture one of the towns, Kondic wanted to avoid contact and sent the regiment between the two towns. This was a poor tactical decision, and as the 13th regiment advanced beyond them, the garrisons launched a coordinated attack on it, nearly encircling it. The 13th regiment's link to the units on the bridgehead was already tenuous, and it was completely severed as the regiment's flanks were attacked. The commander of the 13th regiment mistakenly thought a cavalry charge was coming and used his bugle to order the regiment to prepare for a cavalry charge. This caused such chaos in the ranks of the whole division that in the ensuing last stand, 6,000 members of the Timok I division became casualties by Austrian forces (mostly captured) or drowned trying to escape across the Sava. Kondic, at this time depressed and solitary, informed Stepanović that an Austrian attack had caused confusion in the ranks, but the order was restored. Stepanović learned the truth from a journalist and was furious. Unable to reach Kondic, he sent his chief of staff to visit the beleaguered commander. However, Stepanović's anger would not change the fact that the 13th regiment of the Timok I division and two additional battalions had been near-annihilated, and the advance of the 1st Army was now severely compromised.

== Serbian 1st army's advance and subsequent retreat ==
The 1st Army fared much better than the doomed division intended to set up the diversion. They rapidly and efficiently crossed the Sava River, but due to the failure of the Timok I division, they advanced much more cautiously than they otherwise would. Five days after the landing, the 1st Army was still far from its target. This made the end goal of an invasion of Bosnia simply not viable. On September 8, Oskar Potiorek, overall commander of Austro-Hungarian forces in the Balkans, launched an assault on Serbia, deciding it was the best way to stop the Serbian offensive. On September 11, Putnik decided to retreat and help the forces defending Serbia. By the 14th, all troops in Srem had been evacuated.

== Aftermath ==
The bold Srem offensive had been a failure for the Serbian Army. The total defeat of the Timok I division led many to question the overall viability of the Serbian Army. Vladimir Kondic was court-martialled and jailed for his ineptitude and lying to Stepanović during the battle. Although Potiorek's attack was a complete failure, the 1st Army had to be recalled anyway, and the offensive was called off. The Serbs had taken as much as three times as many casualties as they inflicted, which was especially bad for an army already heavily outnumbered. Criticism was directed at almost everyone involved. Some blamed Stepanović for not telling Kondic promptly about the planned crossing. Stepanović blamed Kondic for his poor leadership. Others blamed the Serbian government itself for caving to Entente pressure in the first place. The attack also demonstrated the complete inability of the Serbian Army to conduct offensive operations.
