= K.u.k. Feldjäger =

The Feldjäger were established in 1808 as Jäger infantry in the Empire of Austria and later formed part of the regular infantry of the Common Army, only their peacetime uniform distinguishing them. The designation Jäger for the soldiers and Feldjäger for their units had purely historical reasons, as light infantry and skirmisher units had been abolished in 1866.

== Uniform ==
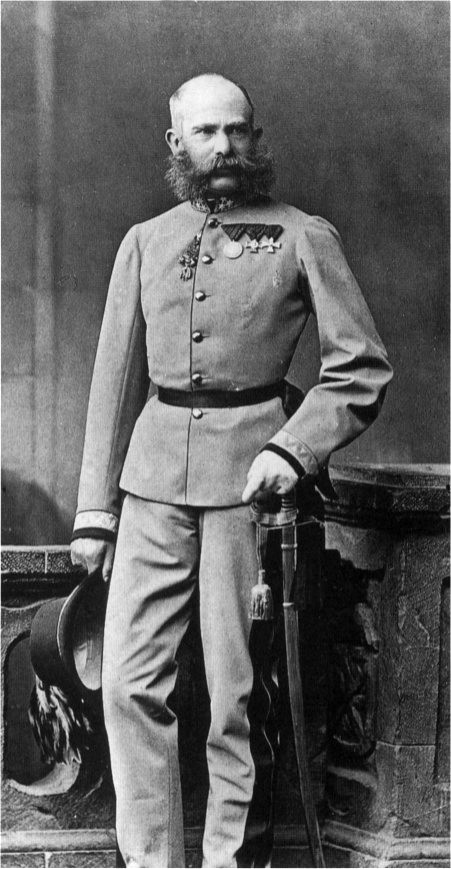
Emperor Franz Joseph I in the parade uniform of the Jäger infantry

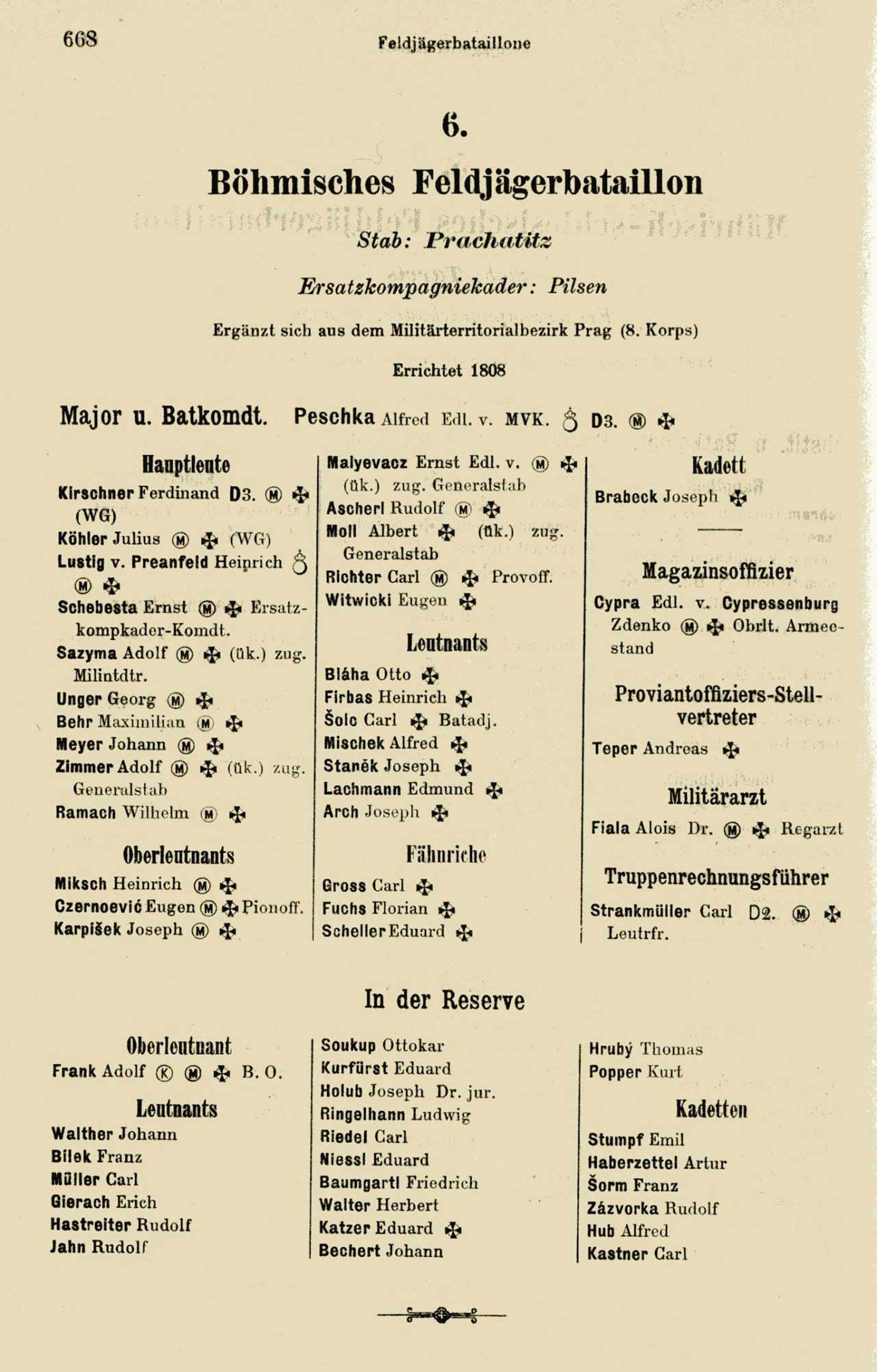
Ranking list of FJB No. 6 from 1909

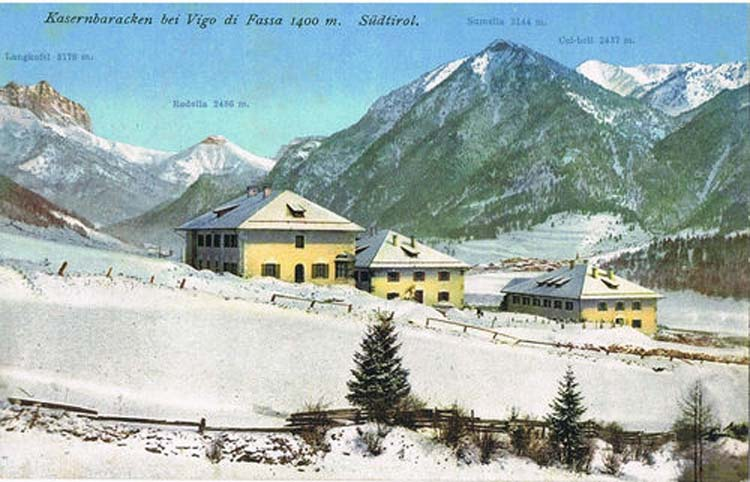
Barracks of the 10th Jäger Battalion in Vigo del Fassa

The hat made of matte black, waterproof felt served as the parade headgear for the Jäger and k.k. Landwehr. It had a crown and brim and was decorated with a circular green cord, the Jäger hat badge and a hackle of black cock feathers. The chinstrap was made of sheep's wool, had a button and an acorn covered with green wool at each end. The two acorns were attached to the rear of the crown. The cord for officers was made of black interwoven gold thread.

The crown was in the shape of an oval cone, with a moderately bulbous base at the top. The brim was level at the back and front, but turned up on both sides. The edge of the brim was edged with black, lacquered calfskin.

On the left side of the brim was a rearward sloping pocket made of hat felt for attaching the hackle. The hat badge - made of gilt metal - depicted a hunting horn. In the space within the coil, a Tyrolean eagle (heraldic animal) was attached in the case of the Kaiserjäger, or the battalion number in the case of the Feldjäger. They were made of silver-coloured nickel silver. The badge was attached above the hackle pocket, so that the eagle or the number slanted in the same direction as the pocket. The plume was in the shape of a cock's tail tied to a 1.5-mm-thick piece of steel wire. The length of the plume was 29 cm. The plume was inserted into the pocket on the hat, so that the feathers hung down in an arc towards the back.

The infantry field cap was used in the field.

The tunic of the Jäger - for soldiers and officers - corresponded in cut to that of the infantry. The soldiers' coat of pike-grey cloth had epaulettes, shoulder patches, collar and cuffs of grass-green colour. The buttons of all Jäger units were yellow (Note: The buttons were not actually yellow, but were made of zinc sheet covered with tombac - so they were actually gold coloured) and marked with the battalion number.

The Jäger jackets were the same colour as the coat. Their arm of service was indicated by their grass-green parolis. The rest of their equipment was no different from that of the line infantry.

== Units ==
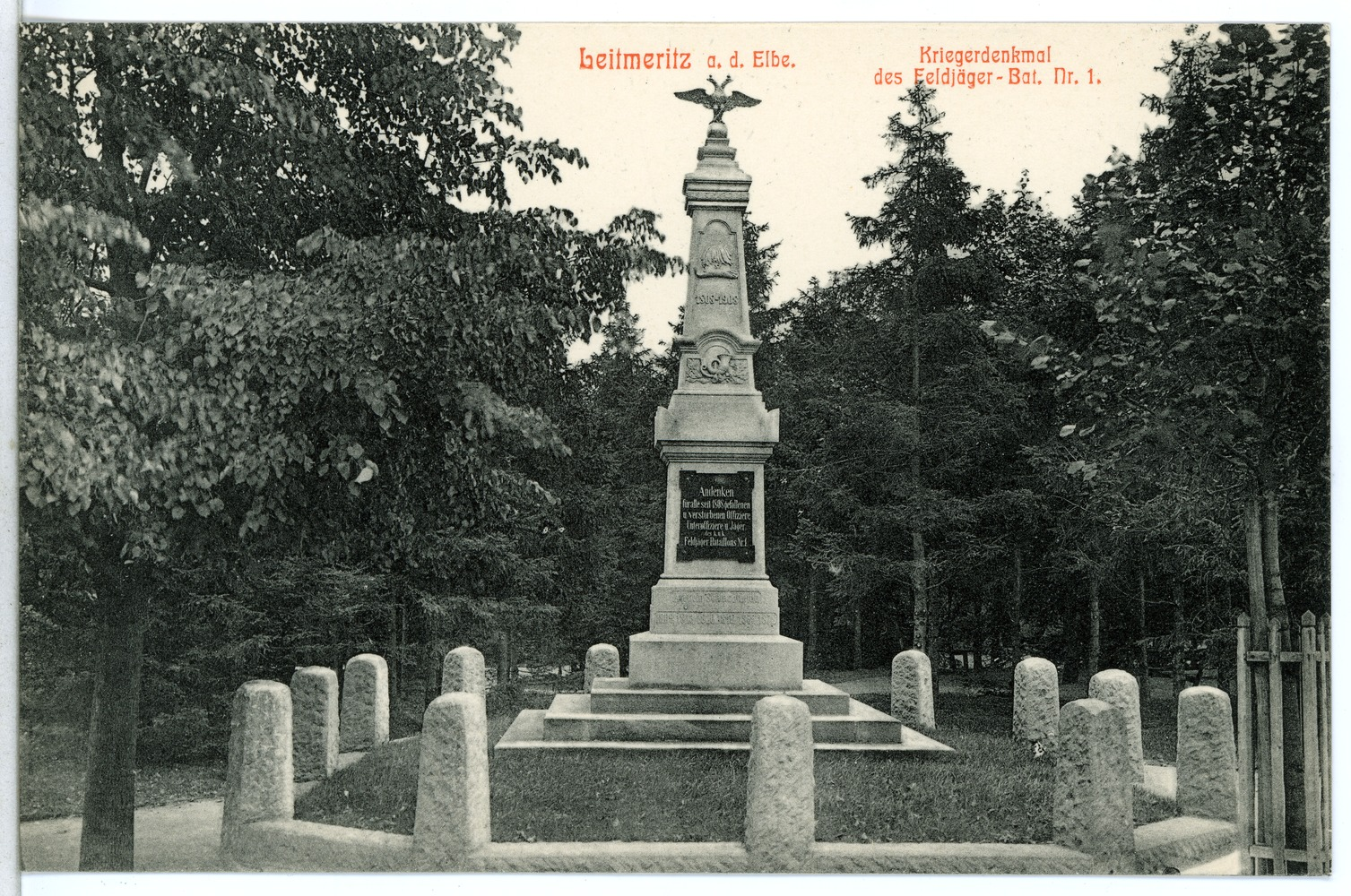
War memorial in Litoměřice to Feldjäger Battalion No. 1 (1911)

In 1914 there were 29 independent Feldjäger battalions and one Bosnian-Herzegovinian Feldjäger Battalion.

- k.u.k. Feldjäger Battalion No. 1

Formed: 1808 – XIV Army Corps – 8th Infantry Division – 16th Infantry Brigade
Nationalities: 62 % Germans – 36 % Czechs – 2 % other
Battalion language: Czech, German
Garrison: Tione di Trento
Recruiting district: Theresienstadt
Commandant: Lieutenant Colonel Richard von Vittorelli

- k.u.k. Feldjäger Battalion No. 2

Formed: 1808 – XIV Army Corps – 8th Infantry Division – 122nd Infantry Brigade
Nationalities: 74 % Czechs – 26 % Germans
Battalion language: Czech, German
Garrison: Lienz
Recruiting district and reinforcement cadre: Hradec Králové
Commandant: Lieutenant Colonel Hugo Mayer

- k.u.k. Feldjäger Battalion No. 3

vakant

- k.u.k. Feldjäger Battalion No. 4

Formed: 1808 – XIV Army Corps – 3rd Infantry Division – 6th Infantry Brigade
Nationalities: 77 % Poles – 23 % other
Battalion language: Polish
Garrison: Braunau
Recruiting district and reinforcement cadre: Rzeszów
Commandant: Lieutenant Colonel Felix Schultz

- k.u.k. Feldjäger Battalion No. 5

Formed: 1808 – III Army Corps – 6th Infantry Division – 12nd Infantry Brigade
Nationalities: 39 % Germans – 25 % Czechs – 25 % Poles – 11 % other
Battalion language: Czech, German, Polish
Garrison: Tarvis
Recruiting district and reinforcement cadre: Olomouc
Commandant: Lieutenant Colonel Carl Pöscheck

- k.u.k. Feldjäger Battalion No. 6

Formed: 1808 – XIV Army Corps – 8th Infantry Division – 122nd Infantry Brigade
Nationalities: 69 % Czechs – 30 % Germans – 1 % other
Battalion language: Czech, German
Recruiting district and reinforcement cadre: Plzeň
Garrison: Sillian
Commandant: Lieutenant Colonel Franz Kahler

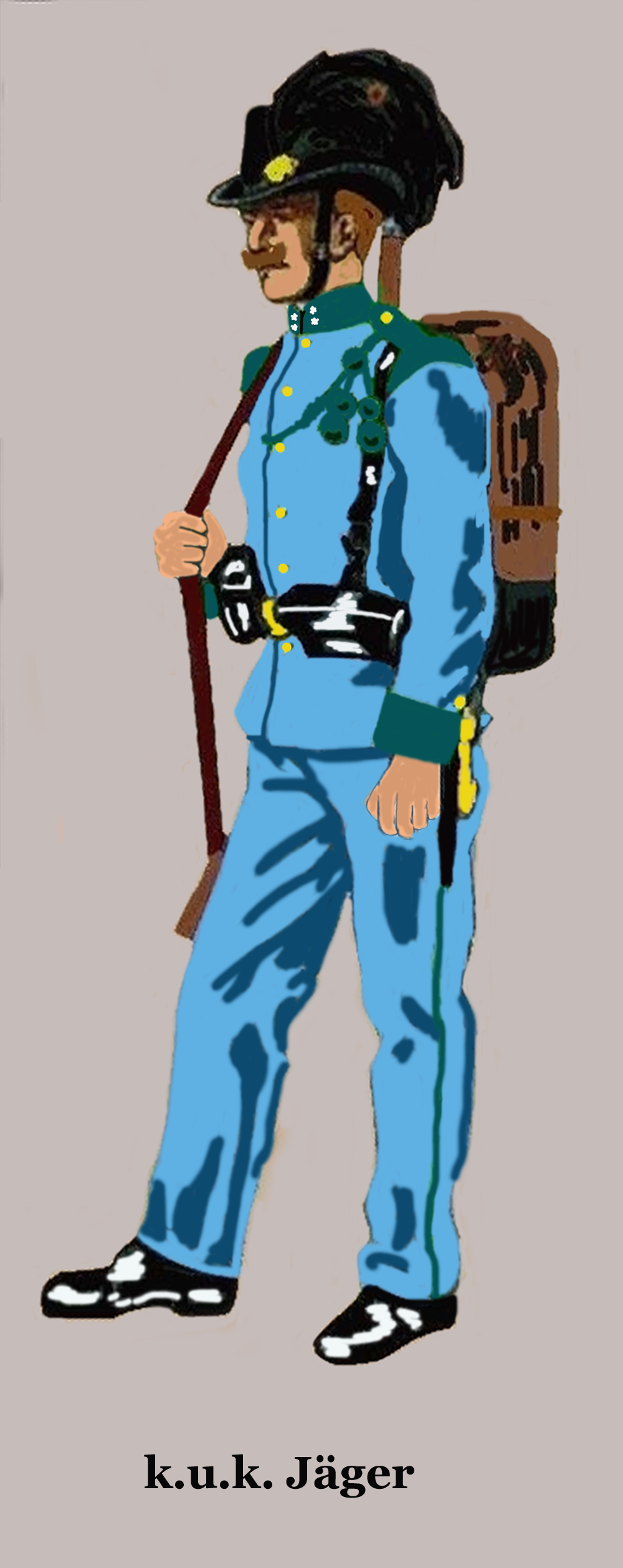
Jäger in marching order

- k.u.k. Feldjäger Battalion No. 7

Formed: 1808 – III Army Corps – 28th Infantry Division – 94th Infantry Brigade
Nationalities: 85 % Slovenes – 15 % other
Battalion language: Slovenian
Recruiting district and reinforcement cadre: Laibach
Garrison: Canale
Commandant: Lieutenant Colonel Wilhelm Staufer

- k.u.k. Feldjäger Battalion No. 8
- k.u.k. Feldjäger Battalion No. 9
- k.u.k. Feldjäger Battalion "Kopal" No. 10

Formed: 1813 – XIV Army Corps – 8th Infantry Division – 15th Infantry Brigade
Nationalities: 98 % Germans – 2 % other
Battalion language: German
Recruiting district and reinforcement cadre: Sankt Pölten
Garrison: Vigo di Fassa
Commandant: Lieutenant Colonel Oswald Eccher von Eccho, Edler v. Marienberg

- k.u.k. Feldjäger Battalion No. 11

Formed: 1813 – III Army Corps – 28th Infantry Division – 56th Infantry Brigade
Nationalities: 52 % Germans – 44 % Hungarians – 4 % other
Battalion language: German, Hungarian
Recruiting district and reinforcement cadre: Győr
Garrison: Gradisca
Commandant: Lieutenant Colonel Norbert Frass

- k.u.k. Feldjäger Battalion No. 12

Formed: 1813 – XIV Army Corps – 8th Infantry Division – 15th Infantry Brigade
Nationalities: 67 % Czechs – 32 % Germans – 1 % other
Battalion language: Czech, German
Recruiting district and reinforcement cadre: Mladá Boleslav
Garrison: Innsbruck
Commandant: Lieutenant Colonel Dante Bontadi

- k.u.k. Feldjäger Battalion No. 13

Formed: 1849 – XIV Army Corps – 8th Infantry Division – 15th Infantry Brigade
Nationalities: 47 % Poles – 36 % Ruthenians – 17 % other
Battalion language: Polish
Recruiting district and reinforcement cadre: Kraków
Garrison: Cavalese
Commandant: Lieutenant Colonel Ludwig Ritter von Stampfer

- k.u.k. Feldjäger Battalion No. 14

Formed: 1914 – XIV Army Corps – 8th Infantry Division – 16th Infantry Brigade
Nationalities: 47 % Ruthenians – 43 % Poles – 1 % other
Battalion language: Polish
Recruiting district and reinforcement cadre: Przemyśl
Garrison: Mezzolombardo
Commandant: Major Alfred von Hankenstein

- k.u.k. Feldjäger Battalion No. 15

vakant

- k.u.k. Feldjäger Battalion No. 16

Formed: 1849 – XIV Army Corps – 8th Infantry Division – 16th Infantry Brigade
Nationalities: 56 % Germans – 34 % Czechs – 10 % other
Battalion language: Czech, German
Recruiting district and reinforcement cadre: Opava
Garrison: Levico
Commandant: Major Karl Lerch

- k.u.k. Feldjäger Battalion No. 17

Formed: 1849 – III Army Corps – 6th Infantry Division – 12nd Infantry Brigade
Nationalities: 63 % Czechs – 36 % Germans – 1 % other
Battalion language: Czech, German
Recruiting district and reinforcement cadre: Brno
Garrison: Judenburg
Commandant: Major Rudolf Dückelmann

- k.u.k. Feldjäger Battalion No. 18

Formed: 1914 – XIV Army Corps – 8th Infantry Division – 16th Infantry Brigade
Nationalities: 59 % Ruthenians – 31 % Poles – 10 % other
Battalion language: Polish
Recruiting district and reinforcement cadre: Lemberg
Garrison: Trient
Commandant: Lieutenant Colonel Maximilian Lauer

- k.u.k. Feldjäger Battalion No. 19

Formed: 1849 – III Army Corps – 6th Infantry Division – 12nd Infantry Brigade
Nationalities: 58 % Slovaks – 32 % Hungarians – 10 % other
Battalion language: Slovak, Hungarian
Recruiting district and reinforcement cadre: Komorn
Garrison: Klagenfurt
Commandant: Major Ernst Mathes

- k.u.k. Feldjäger Battalion No. 20

Formed: 1849 – III Army Corps – 28th Infantry Division – 56th Infantry Brigade
Nationalities: 58 % Slovenes – 31 % Trientines/Triestines – 21 % other
Battalion language: Slovenian, Italian
Recruiting district and reinforcement cadre: Triest
Garrison: Kremaun
Commandant: Lieutenant Colonel Franz Schöbinger

- k.u.k. Feldjäger Battalion No. 21

Formed: 1849 – III Army Corps – 6th Infantry Division – 11th Infantry Brigade
Nationalities: 98 % Germans 2 % other
Battalion language: German
Recruiting district: Vienna
Garrison: Mitrovica
Commandant: Lieutenant Colonel Johann Haas

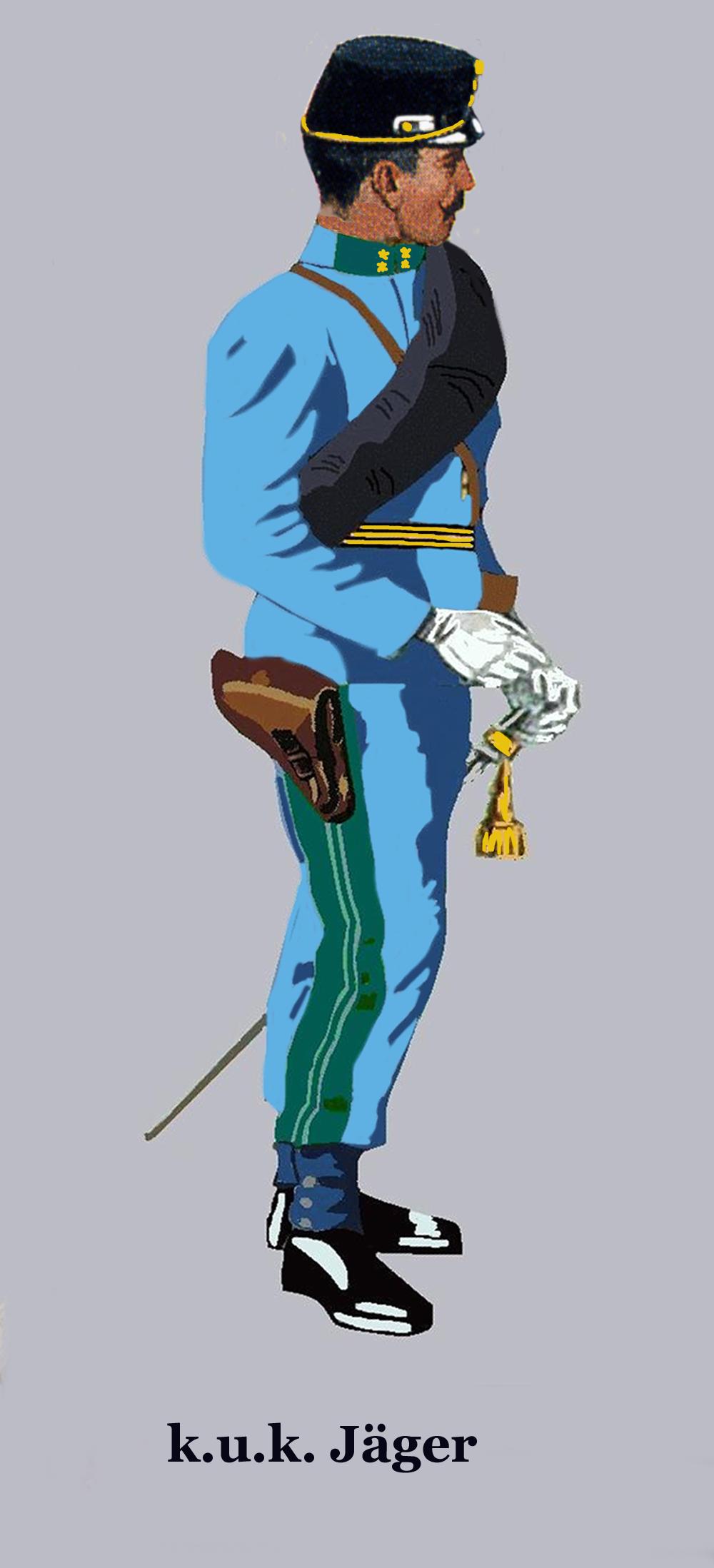
Jäger officer in marching order

- k.u.k. Feldjäger Battalion No. 22

Formed: 1849 – XIV Army Corps – 8th Infantry Division – 16th Infantry Brigade
Nationalities: 70 % Germans – 28 % Czechs – 2 % other
Battalion language: German, Czech
Recruiting district and reinforcement cadre: Eger (Bohemia)
Garrison: Borgo Valsugana
Commandant: Lieutenant Colonel Wenzel Ort

- k.u.k. Feldjäger Battalion No. 23

Formed: 1849 – VII Army Corps – 34th Infantry Division – 68th Infantry Brigade
Nationalities: 68 % Romanians – 28 % Hungarians – 4 % other
Battalion language: Romanian, Hungarian
Recruiting district and reinforcement cadre: Marosvásárhely
Garrison: Pančevo
Commandant: Major Theodor Althoff

- k.u.k. Feldjäger Battalion No. 24

Formed: 1849 – III Army Corps – 28th Infantry Division – 55th Infantry Brigade
Nationalities: 86 % Hungarians – 14 % other
Battalion language: Hungarian
Recruiting district and reinforcement cadre: Budapest
Garrison: Rovigno (one coy. in Parenzo)
Commandant: Lieutenant Colonel Emmerich Gerö

- k.u.k. Feldjäger Battalion No. 25

Formed: 1849 – II Army Corps – 25th Infantry Division – 49th Infantry Brigade
Nationalities: 75 % Czechs – 22 % Germans – 3 % other
Battalion language: Czech, German
Recruiting district and reinforcement cadre: Brno
Garrison: Vienna (Schönbrunner Schloßkaserne / two companies at the Mauerkaserne barracks)
Commandant: Lieutenant Colonel Arnold Barwick

- k.u.k. Feldjäger Battalion No. 26

vakant

- k.u.k. Feldjäger Battalion No. 27

Formed: 1914 – XIV Army Corps – 8th Infantry Division – 121st Infantry Brigade
Nationalities: 54 % Romanians – 27 % Ruthenians – 19 % other
Battalion language: Romanian, Polish
Recruiting district and reinforcement cadre: Czernowitz
Garrison: Hall in Tirol
Commandant: Major Friedrich Nürnberger

- k.u.k. Feldjäger Battalion No. 28

Formed: 1859 – VII Army Corps – 34th Infantry Division – 68th Infantry Brigade
Nationalities: 73 % Romanians – 27 % other
Battalion language: Romanian
Recruiting district: Arad
Garrison: Kevévara
Commandant: Lieutenant Colonel Augustin Dorotka von Ehrenwall

- k.u.k. Feldjäger Battalion No. 29

Formed: 1859 – III Army Corps – 28th Infantry Division – 56th Infantry Brigade
Nationalities: 29 % Hungarians – 67 % Slovaks – 4 % sonstige
Battalion language: Hungarian, Slovak
Recruiting district and reinforcement cadre: Losoncz
Garrison: Monfalcone
Commandant: Lieutenant Colonel Desiderius Farkas

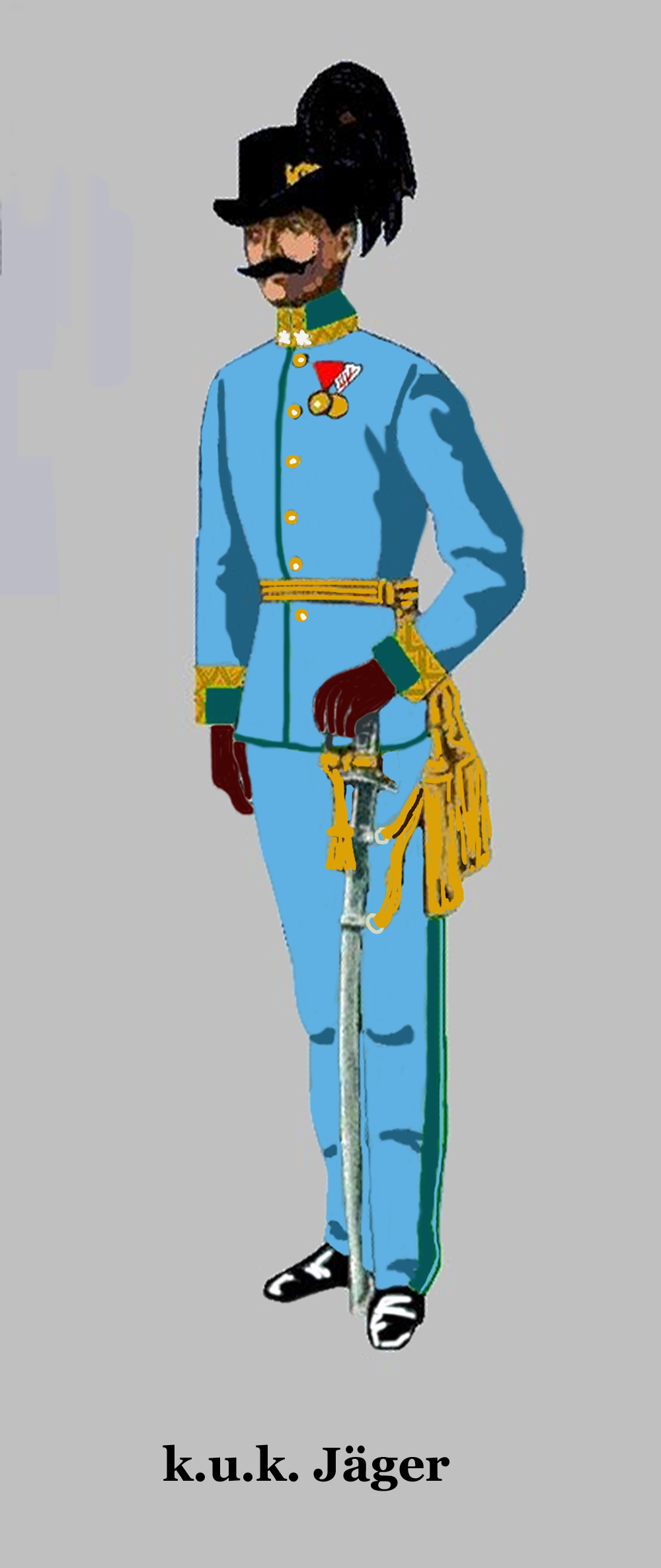
Major in parade uniform

- k. u. k. Feldjäger Battalion No. 30

Formed: 1859 – XIV Army Corps – 3rd Infantry Division – 6th Infantry Brigade
Nationalities: 70 % Ruthenians – 30 % other
Battalion language: Polish
Recruiting district and reinforcement cadre: Stanislav
Garrison: Steyr
Commandant: Lieutenant Colonel Joseph Jungl

- k.u.k. Feldjäger Battalion No. 31

Formed: 1859 – XIII Army Corps – 7th Infantry Division – 14th Infantry Brigade
Nationalities: 95 % Croats – 5 % other
Battalion language: Croatian
Recruiting district and reinforcement cadre: Zagreb
Garrison: Bruck an der Mur
Commandant: Lieutenant Colonel Eduard Hospodarž

- k.u.k. Feldjäger Battalion No. 32

Formed: 1859 – XI Army Corps – 30th Infantry Division – 60th Infantry Brigade
Nationalities: 74 % Slovaks – 26 % other
Battalion language: Slovak
Recruiting district and reinforcement cadre: Prešov
Garrison: Trembowla
Commandant: Lieutenant Colonel Carl Strohmer

== ORBAT ==
=== Peace establishment ===
26 officers, 390 men, 20 horse

- Battalion staff
- 4 field companies
- 1 Jäger machine gun division
- Reinforcement company cadre with augmentation magazine (training)

=== War establishment ===
26 officers, 1,100 men, 70 horse

- Battalion staff
- 4 field companies
- 1 Jäger machine gun division
- Wagon train
- Reinforcement companies (in the home garrison)

== Sources ==
- Austrian State Archives / War Archives in Vienna

== Literature ==
- Peter Fichtenbauer, Christian Ortner: Die Geschichte der österreichischen Armee von Maria Theresia bis zur Gegenwart in Essays und bildlichen Darstellungen, Verlag Militaria, Vienna, 2015, ISBN 978-3-902526-71-7
- Johann C. Allmayer-Beck, Erich Lessing: Die K.u.k. Armee. 1848–1914. Verlag Bertelsmann, Munich, 1974, ISBN 3-570-07287-8.
- k.u.k. Kriegsministerium „Dislokation und Einteilung des k.u.k Heeres, der k.u.k. Kriegsmarine, der k.k. Landwehr und der k.u. Landwehr“ in: Seidels kleines Armeeschema – Publisher: Seidel & Sohn Vienna, 1914
- Hauptmann V. Pech: Heerwesen-Tabellen Lehr- und Lernbehelf für Militärerziehungs- und Bildungsanstalten sowie Reserveoffiziersschulen, Prague, 1915
- Stefan Rest: Des Kaisers Rock im ersten Weltkrieg. Verlag Militaria, Vienna, 2002, ISBN 3-9501642-0-0
