= Alfred Krauss (officer) =

Austrian general, politician (1862–1938)

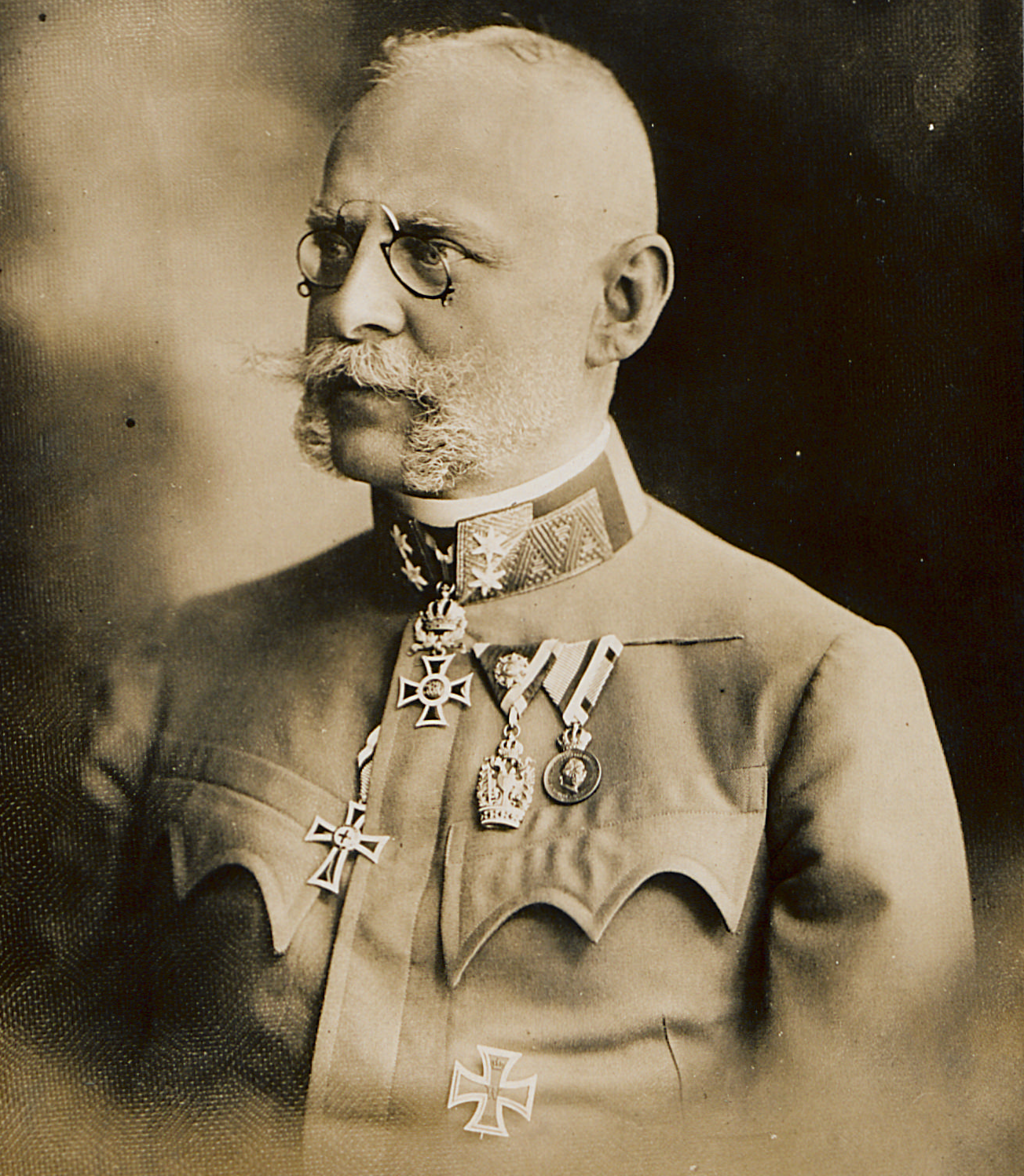
- Born: 26 April 1862; Zadar, Dalmatia, Austrian Empire
- Died: 29 September 1938 (aged 76); Bad Goisern am Hallstättersee, Upper Danube, Nazi Germany
- Military career
- Allegiance: Austria-Hungary
- Branch: Austro-Hungarian Army
- Service years: 1883–1918
- Rank: General der Infanterie
- Commands: 2nd Infantry Division; 33rd Infantry Division; 29th Infantry Division; 1st Army Corps; Eastern Army
- Conflicts: World War I: Serbian campaign; Srem Offensive; Italian Front; Battle of Caporetto
- Awards: Order of the Iron Crown 1st class Grand Cross of the Order of Leopold; Pour le Mérite

Alfred Krauss (26 April 1862 – 29 September 1938) was an Austro-Hungarian officer, privy councilor, and the last-appointed General der Infanterie in the Austro-Hungarian Army. From 1920 Krauss was the leader of the National Association of German Officers in Vienna. In the last year of his life he was appointed a member of the Reichstag for the Nazi Party and an SA-Brigadeführer in the Sturmabteilung (SA), the Nazi paramilitary organization.

== Biography ==
=== Family ===
Alfred Krauss was born in Zadar, the son of the Austro-Hungarian General Staff Doctor Dr. med. Franz Krauss (1824–1905) and his wife Maria Rosalia (née Deixler; 1841–85). His younger brother, Rudolf Krauss (1863–1943), also achieved the rank of general of the infantry during the First World War. On 6 February 1894 Alfred Krauss married in the Herz-Jesu-Kirche in Graz Ida Gysela Weeber (born 26 January 1868 in Raab; died 13 May 1939 in Vienna), with whom he had two sons, one of them was the later well-known organologist Egon Krauss. Alfred and Ida Krauss were buried in the evangelical cemetery in Bad Goisern am Hallstättersee in a high grave. The grave slab is adorned with a soaring eagle holding an oak wreath in its claws.

=== Military career ===
After attending the elementary school in Vršac and Sopron as well as the lower grammar school in Cieszyn, Krauss was trained at the military high school in Mährisch-Weißkirchen and at the Theresian Military Academy in Wiener Neustadt. On 18 August 1883, he was transferred to the Infantry Regiment No. 11. He then attended the war school in Vienna from 1886 to 1888. In November 1888, he was appointed General Staff Officer of the 20th Infantry Brigade in Hradec Králové. In 1891, Krauss joined the General Staff of the 5th Corps Command in Pressburg as a captain. In 1894, Krauss became a teacher of tactics at the Theresian Military Academy. In 1897, he became Chief of Staff of the 2nd Infantry Division in Jarosław and then the 33rd Infantry Division in Komorn.

In November 1901 Krauss became commander of a battalion in the Graz Rifle Regiment No. 3 and in 1904 was named head of Section III of the Technical Military Committee in Vienna. In October 1910 he became the commander of the Kriegsschule in Vienna. On 1 November 1910, he was promoted to major general and, on 1 November 1913, he achieved the rank of lieutenant field marshal; being also named a Geheimrat (privy councilor).

From August 1914, Krauss was in command of the 29th Infantry Division in the Serbian campaign of World War I. At the beginning of the war, this was part of the 5th Army under General of the Infantry Liborius Ritter von Frank in Syrmia. In September, he was appointed commander of the "Combined Corps Krauss". On 6 September 1914 he prevented the Serbian Timok Division from crossing the Sava at Mitrovica by counter-attacking at Šašinci. At the beginning of December, his troops were involved in the fighting to withdraw from Belgrade. On 23 December 1914, he was appointed Chief of Staff of the Balkan Forces, whose command after Oskar Potiorek was recalled was taken over by Archduke Eugen in January 1915.

On 27 May 1915, after Italy entered the war, he was appointed Chief of Staff of the newly formed Southwest Front on the Isonzo. In February 1916 he changed to the Army Group of Field Marshal Archduke Eugen in Bolzano in the same position. In May 1916 he was significantly involved in the offensive in South Tyrol, but the planned breakthrough over the plateau of the seven municipalities did not succeed in full after initial successes in the Asiago area and had to be canceled in mid-June after Italian counter-attacks and the Brusilov offensive.

In mid-March 1917 Krauss became the commander of the I. Corps, which at that time was deployed in the 7th Army under General of the Infantry Hermann Kövess in the Carpathian Mountains. On 1 August 1917 he was promoted to General of the Infantry. In mid-September 1917, his large unit moved to Italy and was subordinated to the newly established German 14th Army as the right wing and made available for the counter-offensive in the Battle of Caporetto. On 24 and 25 October 1917 the I. Corps broke through the Italian front at Flitsch and reached the new front section at Feltre and Monte Grappa, where the new "Belluno Corps Group" was established. General Krauss took over the supreme command of the Austro-Hungarian Eastern Army on 16 May 1918, and was also in command of the occupied territories in Ukraine. After the end of the war, Krauss was retired on 1 December 1918. For his services, Krauss received, among other decorations, the Order of the Iron Crown 1st Class, the Grand Cross of the Order of Leopold and the Pour le Mérite on 12 November 1917.

=== Post-military life ===
In 1920, Krauss became leader of the National Association of German Officers in Vienna. From 1927 until his death in 1938, he was one of the editors of the Pan-German and National Socialist magazine Deutschlands Erneuerung, which was founded in 1917 and which appeared continuously until 1944.

On 1 April 1938, following the Anschluss with Nazi Germany, Krauss was granted the right to wear a uniform with the insignia of rank of a German general of the infantry. From this point until his death in September of the same year, Krauss sat as a member of the Reichstag. His mandate was then taken over by Hanns Albin Rauter. In the Sturmabteilung (SA) he achieved the rank of SA-Brigadeführer. On 3 June 1938, Krauss and his wife Ida Krauss were personally received by Adolf Hitler in Berlin.

He died in Bad Goisern am Hallstättersee in 1938.

== Works ==
- Moltke, Benedek and Napoleon , Vienna 1901.
- 1805 - The Campaign of Ulm , L.W. Seidel & Sohn, Vienna 1912, online at archive.org
- Our Germanness! , Salzburg 1920.
- The Causes of Our Defeat - Memories and Judgments from World War I , J.F. Lehmanns Verlag, Munich 1920. (several editions) online at archive.org
- The essential unity of politics and war as the starting point of a German political theory, lecture, Munich 1921.
- The importance of Austria for the future of the German people, Hanover 1923.
- The "miracle of Karfreit", in particular the breakthrough at Flitsch and the conquest of the Tagliamento , Munich 1926.
- The mistake of German royal policy, Munich 1927.
- Führertum, lecture, Berlin 1931.
- Shaper of the World, Munich 1932.
- Mountain War, Vienna 1935.
- Theory and Practice in the Art of War, Munich 1936.

== Bibliography ==
- Rainer Egger (1980). "Krauss, Alfred". Neue Deutsche Biographie (in German). Vol. 12. Berlin: Duncker & Humblot. pp. 711–712. (full text online).
- Rainer Egger: "Krauss Alfred". In: Österreichisches Biographisches Lexikon 1815–1950 (ÖBL). Vol. 4, Austrian Academy of Sciences, Vienna 1969, p. 221 f. (Direct links to "p. 221", "p. 222")
- Karl-Friedrich Hildebrand, Christian Zweng: Die Ritter des Ordens Pour le Mérite des I. Weltkriegs, Band 2: H–O, Biblio Verlag, Bissendorf 2003, ISBN 3-7648-2516-2, S. 267–269
- Information about Alfred Krauss (officer) in the Reichstag database
- Newspaper clippings about Alfred Krauss in the 20th Century Press Archives of the ZBW
