= Komorn =

Komorn may refer to:

- Komárom in Hungary, Komorn in German
- Komárno in Slovakia, Komorn in German
