= Borgosatollo =

- Comune
- Comune di Brescia
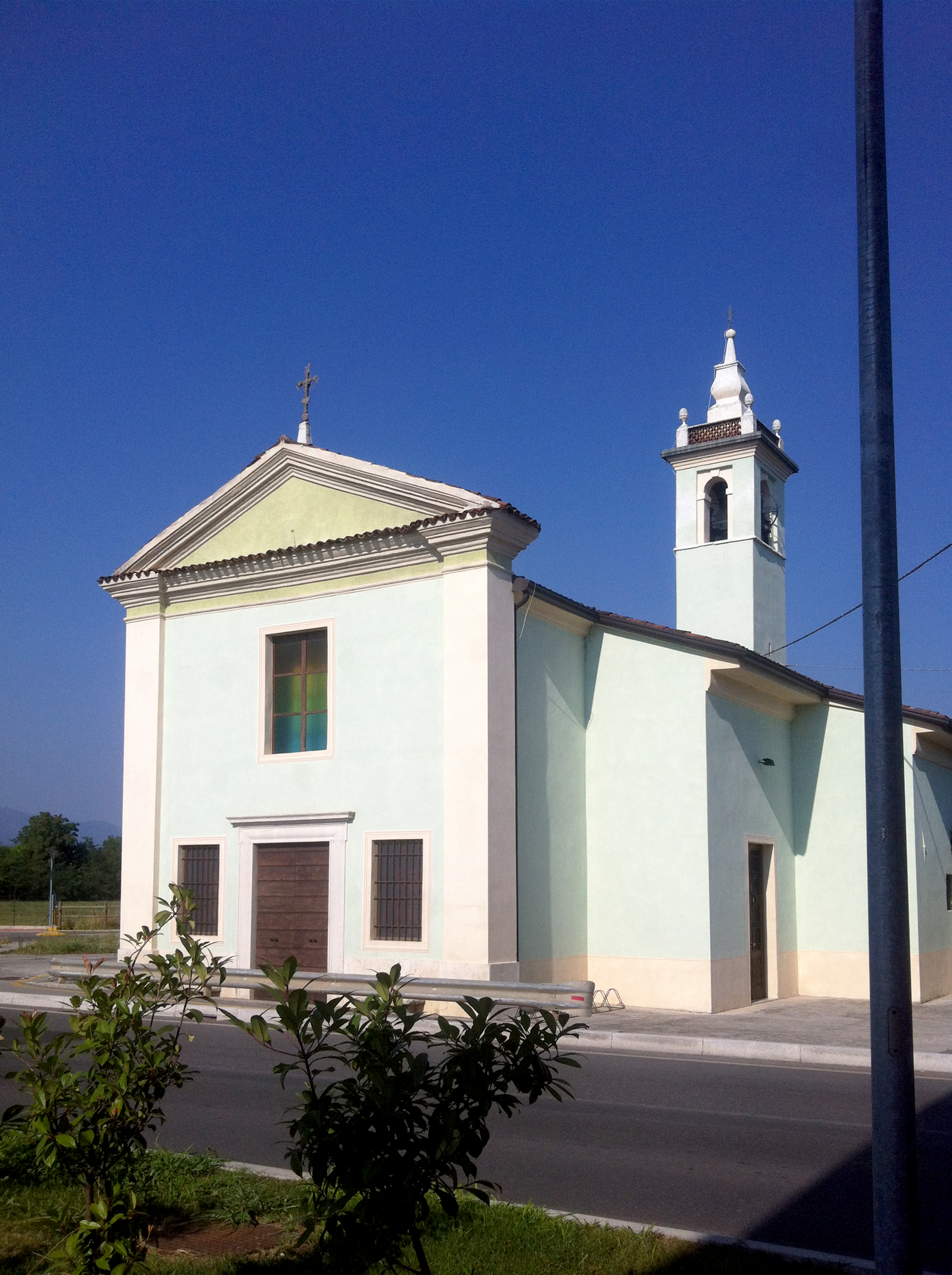
- Church of Santissima Trinità in Borgosatollo

- Location within Italy Location within Lombardy
- Coordinates: 45°28′34″N 10°14′24″E
- Country: Italy
- Region: Lombardy
- Province: Brescia (BS)
- Frazioni: Brescia, Castenedolo, Ghedi, Montirone, Poncarale, San Zeno Naviglio

Area
  - Total: 8 km^{2} (3.1 sq mi)
- Elevation: 112 m (367 ft)

Population (2011)
  - Total: 9,289
  - Density: 1,200/km^{2} (3,000/sq mi)
- Demonym: Borgosatollesi
- Time zone: UTC+1 (CET)
  - Summer (DST): UTC+2 (CEST)
- Postal code: 25010
- Dialing code: 030
- ISTAT code: 017021
- Patron saint: Santa Maria Annunciata
- Saint day: 25 March
- Website: Official website

Borgosatollo (Brescian: Borsadòl) is a comune in the province of Brescia, in Lombardy, Italy. It is bounded by other communes of Brescia, Castenedolo, Montirone, Poncarale and San Zeno Naviglio, and situated directly south of Brescia, in the plain.
Borgosatollo's area include also two frazioni, Gerole and Piffione.

== Symbol ==
The coat of arms of the town was established by Royal Decree of August 28, 1931 following a request made last year by the municipal administration to the Heraldic Florence on the basis of a representation in stone placed on the arch of the entrance of the municipal building. The shield is an sannitico type, stamped by the crown of Italian municipalities regulate, and depicts a sheep rampant on blue. The two branches are in decusse laurel, left, and oak, right, both presented with fruits.

Bosio (2006) reports the popular tradition according to which the original coat of arms had a boar rampant on green background, as demonstrated by some versions of the banner municipal.

== History ==
=== Middle Ages ===
Until the thirteenth century, the territory of Borgosatollo was uncultivated due to the characteristics of the soil, substantially gravelly, and due to the lack of an irrigation network. In that period, on the initiative of the municipal republic of Brescia and of the bishop Berardo Maggi, derivations of the Brescia Naviglio Grande were built, such as the Naviglio Inferiore, the San Pola canal, the Mora or Avogadra and the Vescovada, which allowed the land to be cleared up to at the present via San Francesco d'Assisi.

Borgosatollo in the fourteenth century was involved in the wars between Scaligeri and Visconti, given its strategic position. According to Mazza (1986) two castles were built: one on the Naviglio, near the bridge along the road that connected Poncarale to Castenedolo and Rezzato, and one near the current Castle district, to defend the inhabitants.

During the second half of the fourteenth century, the Visconti had become stable rulers of the Brescia area and decided to repopulate the areas devastated by wars and the plague of 1348 with inhabitants from the Bergamo valleys of the Scalve and Seriana valleys. Borgosatollo also saw the population of new families coming from those areas.

Around 1380, the inhabitants of the town who had not obtained Brescia's citizenship formed in common with a system, that of the Vicinias, which was maintained in vogue until 1797. According to the Viscount Estimus of 1385, the municipality belonged to the square of Capriano with Mairano.

=== After the Italian Unification ===
Following the events of the second Italian war of independence (1859), Borgosatollo became part of the Kingdom of Sardinia (from 1861, the Kingdom of Italy). On the basis of the decree Rattazzi was included in Rezzato's IV district, belonging to the District I of the new province of Brescia.

At the turn of the nineteenth and twentieth centuries, the company Facchi & Fisogni was established in the country and was the first to experiment in Italy with the fractional distribution system of milk, both whole and skimmed, distributing it in glass bottles throughout the provincial capital.

With royal decree 4 December 1927, n. 2350, the nearby town of Montirone was abolished, the territory of which was assigned to that of Borgosatollo. In 1955 the Montironese municipal autonomy was restored, which materialized the following year.

== Language ==
In the territory of Borgosatollo, alongside Italian, is also spoken the Lombard language primarily in its variant of Brescian dialect.

== Frazioni ==
The municipal statute recognizes the presence of two frazioni:

- Gerole
- Piffione

In the territory of the municipality are the following locations: Colombo, Fuserino, Gorgone, Pradossi, Sorek, Venezia.

== Main sights ==
=== Church of Santa Maria Annunciata ===
It is the parish church of the town, dedicated to the Annunciation of Mary. The previous factory was raised between the fourteenth and fifteenth centuries. The current building was built on a project by Antonio Marchetti in the second half of the eighteenth century: the first stone was laid on August 1, 1762 and the work continued in the following decades. The interior is punctuated by architraved columns and triangular tympanums. The Annunciation and the Last Supper are the work of Sante Cattaneo, while the Holy Trinity with Saints Barnabas, Agostino and Monica is by Pietro Muttoni known as the Old Man. The attribution of the author of the work Sant'Antonio and the Immaculate Conception is uncertain, as are the nine broad bricks containing the life of Mary. The decorations are the work of Pietro Scalvini.

=== Church of Santissima Trinità ===
The church of the Holy Trinity is a building design with a single nave. It is located on the driveway for Ghedi and is dedicated to the Christian dogma of the Trinity.

It was built in the fifteenth century and was used as a leper hospital during the plague of 1630.

=== St. Michael the Archangel ===
Build around the thirteenth century, is now on road 23 between Borgosatollo and Montirone.

It still has some frescoes in the apse.

== Transport ==
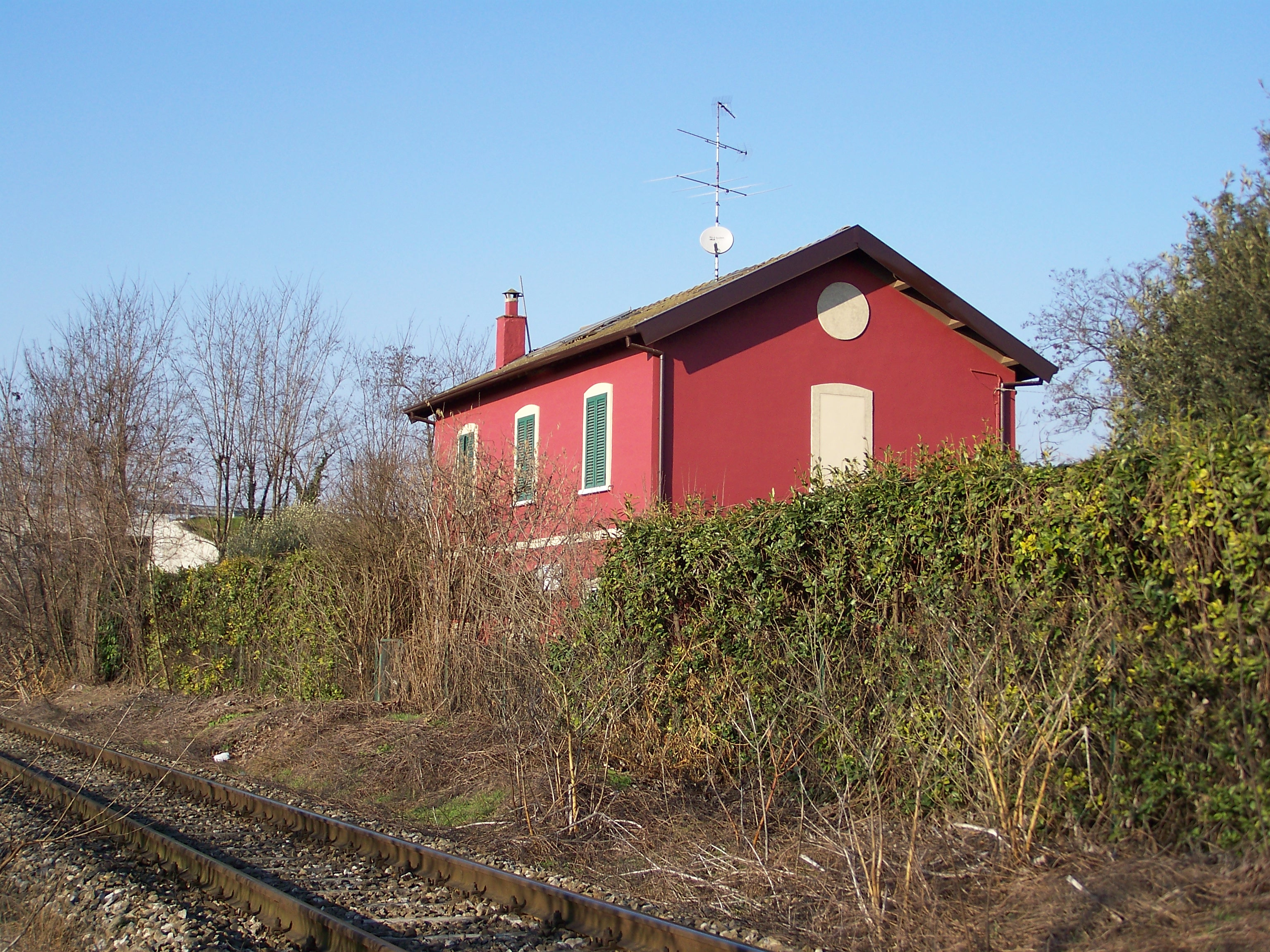
Borgosatollo ex-station

The Borgosatollo's area is cross by Brescia-Parma railway. Until the early twentieth century, it was running a train station, later abandoned and converted into a private residence.

The inhabited center and the hamlet of Piffione are crossed by the provincial 23 Borgosatollo-Montirone which joins north on the former Brescia-Cremona state road and south on the provincial 24 Chiaviche-Cadimarco. Provincial 77 begins from the center of Borgosatollo, connecting the town to the nearby town of Castenedolo, near the Alpine resort.

The Borgosatollese territory is crossed to the west by the A21 Turin-Piacenza-Brescia motorway. Close to the municipal boundaries in the south there is the Ospitaletto-Montichiari motorway link that serves Borgosatollo through the homonymous highway exit. In addition to this, the closest toll booths are those of Brescia Centro, in Brescia, and Brescia Sud, in the territory of Poncarale.

The Brescia-Parma railway runs south-west of the Borgosatollese area. Until the early twentieth century, a railway station was in operation, later abandoned and converted into a private home.

The municipality is part of the urban transport network of the province of Brescia and is therefore served by the 14 Metro Volta-Borgosatollo-Capodimonte line, with some Brescia-Capodimonte station runs.

In the vicinity of Borgosatollo there is also the "Gabriele D'Annunzio" airport of Brescia-Montichiari, mainly interested in the transport of goods.

== Sports ==
=== Football ===
In Borgosatollo there were initially two football teams, today united in the same football group:

the A.C. Borgosatollo 1982 Calcio company born in 1982 which played in the Lombardy group of promotion whose colors are white and red.

Real Calcio Borgosatollo. Whose colors are yellow and blue.

=== Tamburello ===
There is a tamburello team, the A.T. Borgosatollo who was champion of Italy in 2001 (the only Brescia team to win the title in Serie A) and champion of Europe in the seasons 2000, 2001 and 2002.

=== Other sports ===
There are also volleyball and basketball teams.

Also important is the cycling of which the greatest local export was Benedetto Pola, world cycling champion to whom the town's sports center is named.
