= Giuseppe Lechi =

Italian general (1766–1836)

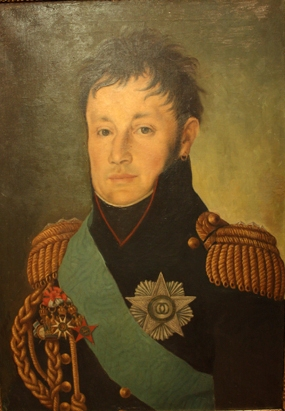
- Born: 5 December 1766; San Zeno Naviglio, Republic of Venice
- Died: 9 August 1836 (aged 69); Montirone, Kingdom of Lombardy–Venetia, Austrian Empire
- Spouse: Eleonora
- Relatives: Teodoro Lechi (brother); Francesca Lechi (sister)
- Military career
- Allegiance: Republic of Venice (until 1797); Kingdom of Italy (1797–1801); Kingdom of Naples (1802–1815)
- Rank: Captain (Venice); Division General (Italy)
- Conflicts: French Revolutionary Wars; War of the Second Coalition; Italian campaigns; Battle of Marengo; Napoleonic Wars; War of the Third Coalition; Invasion of Naples (1806); Peninsular War; War of the Seventh Coalition; Neapolitan War; Battle of Tolentino

Giuseppe ("Joseph") Lechi (5 December 1766 – 9 August 1836) was an Italian general in the Kingdom of Italy during the Napoleonic Wars.

== Early life ==
Born in Aspes and being the first son of Faustino Lechi and his wife Doralice Bielli, the general Giuseppe Lechi was already considered a man of great light and shadows ("dark and gloomy"), reckless and unscrupulous similar to his uncle the Count Galliano Lechi, (Note: Fausto or Faustino Lechi, who was a minor brother of the notorious Count Galliano Lechi portrayed in a book by Stendhal as "Count Vitelleschi". A sister of Giuseppe Lechi's Franca, or "Fanny", became a Stendhal's character too as also his brother the general Teodoro, Napoleon's "mon beau général", who was portrayed in the character of the model gentleman and soldier "Count of Pietranera" in the book The Charterhouse of Parma (1839).) who was very dear, and a model, to Giuseppe. His grandfather Pietro was a famous Freemason and a follower of the Enlightenment and his sister Francesca Lechi was an Italian revolutionary, figure in Milanese society and mistress of Joachim Murat.

== Military career ==
Lechi pursued a military career in the Austrian army, reaching the rank of captain. Upon the arrival of Napoleon in Italy, influenced also by his brother Giacomo, Giuseppe organized with his other brothers Teodoro and Angelo and other friends – all of them members of the "Casino dei Buoni Amici" free-masonic secret society – the Bresciana revolution of 18 March 1797.

Giuseppe entered the temporary government of Brescia and organized the Brescian Legion, which Napoleon sent to fight in Emilia and the Marche, and then in Central Italy.

It was in Città di Castello, in 1798, that happened the famous episode of the discussed donation of Raphael's painting "The Marriage of the Virgin" to Giuseppe Lechi by the City Council. (Note: The painting was actually preserved at the Academy of Brera, in Milan, Italy.)

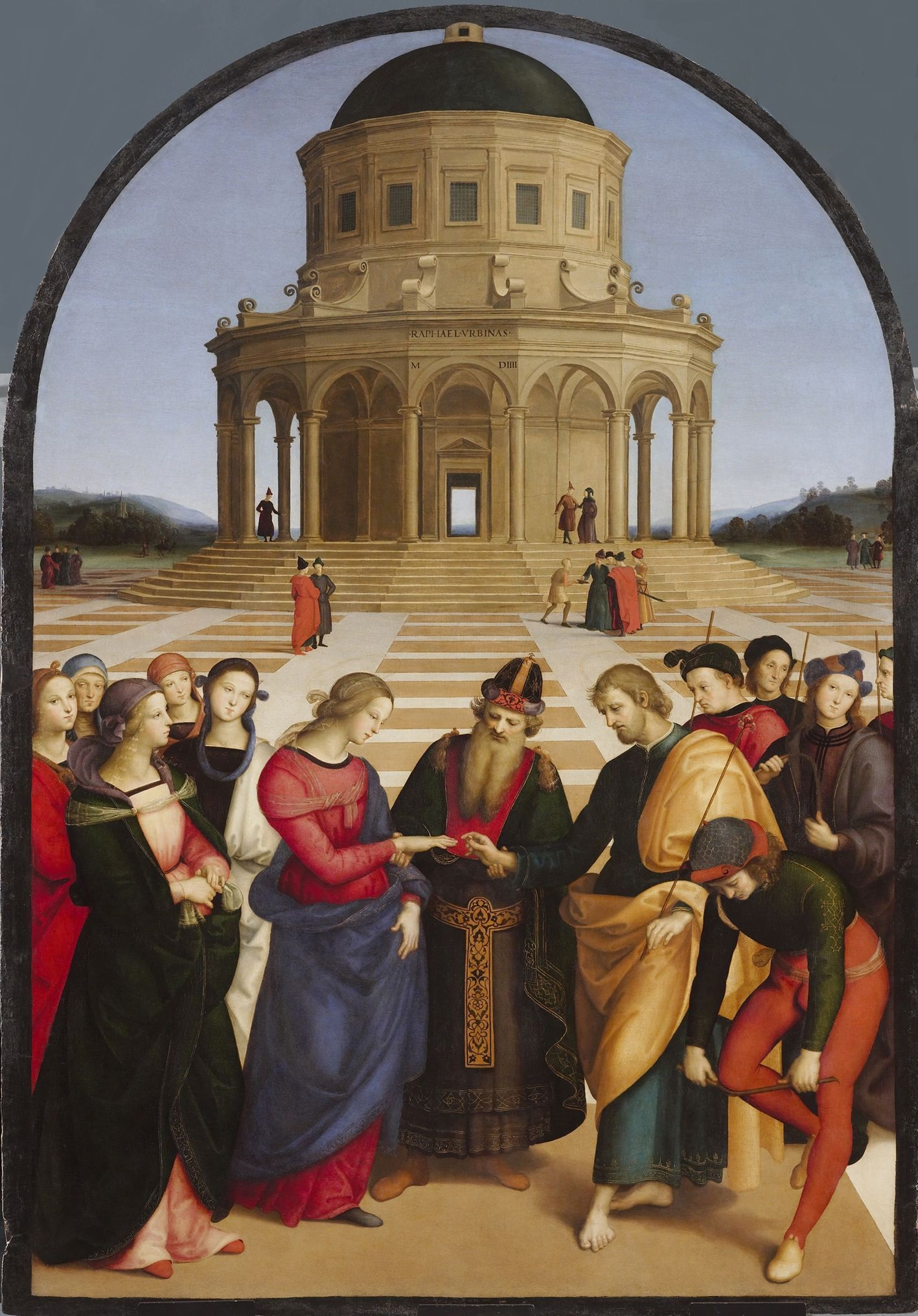
Raphael's altarpiece The Wedding of the Virgin, which was given to Lechi in 1798.

26 janvier 1802, Le Consulte de la République cisalpine réunie en comices à Lyon pour décerner la présidence au premier consul. Nicolas-André Monsiau, 1806–1808.

In the spring of 1799, Giuseppe Lechi, with his unit, was engaged in a military campaign in Valtellina, attempting to curb an anti-French revolt. Forced to retreat by the Austro-Russians, he joined the Italian Legion of General Pietro Teulié in Dijon.

Back in Italy with Napoleon he fought at Marengo (14 June 1800) where he was promoted to the rank of division general on the field itself.

After the Peace of Lunéville (9 February 1801) he became commander of division under Joachim Murat and one of his friends, followers and advisors. At the same time, Giuseppe entered the new legislative body of the Italian Republic.

More and more bound up with the "Murat's circle", General Lechi joined the Masonry of the Scottish Rite (becoming the Great Master of the Grand Lodge of Naples) and those groups of patriots who supported the ideal of the Italian unification.

In 1806, Giuseppe Lechi participated in the conquest of the Kingdom of Naples, fighting in the Adriatic regions under general Saint-Cyr. In 1805, he was again in Naples with Murat and Joseph Bonaparte, to whom too he would become closely tied by friendship and personal fidelity.

In 1808 and 1809, Lechi was in Spain at the service of Joseph Bonaparte, who had yielded the Kingdom of Naples to Murat. When Joseph conquered the city of Barcelona, Lechi was temporarily the governor there.

=== Trial ===
In 1809, he faced a trial in France (for claims of violence, embezzlement, and abuse) but escaped the judgment and was sent back to Naples at the service of his friend, the new king, Joachim Murat.

Lechi was also involved in the conspiracies of General Domenico Pino, likely as a link to Murat himself in the plot.

=== Neapolitan War ===
On 31 January 1814, Giuseppe was governor of Tuscany, handing over Livorno to the English Fleet in an attempt made by Murat to bargain a separate peace with Austria. In 1815, "Joseph" Lechi was, as always, at Murat's side in his last and hopeless stand against the Austrians at the Battle of Tolentino (2–3 May 1815). As a prisoner of war, Lechi refused to swear any fidelity to the new Habsburgic regime and remained imprisoned in Ljubljana until 1818.

== Personal life and death ==
Freed, Lechi settled down in his family's Villa of Montirone near Brescia and married Eleonora, daughter of Joseph Jérôme, Comte Siméon. He then died of cholera in 1836 in Montirone.
