= Castel Mella =

Castel Mella Castèl Mèlå
- Comune
- Comune di Castel Mella
- Location within Italy Location within Lombardy
- Coordinates: 45°30′N 10°9′E
- Country: Italy
- Region: Lombardy
- Province: Brescia (BS)
- Frazioni: Onzato, Colorne

Area
  - Total: 7 km^{2} (2.7 sq mi)

Population (2011)
  - Total: 10,926
  - Density: 1,600/km^{2} (4,000/sq mi)
- Demonym: Castelmellesi
- Time zone: UTC+1 (CET)
  - Summer (DST): UTC+2 (CEST)
- Postal code: 25030
- Dialing code: 030
- Patron saint: Syrus of Pavia and Saint Lucy
- Saint day: 9 December
- Website: Official website

Castel Mella (Castelnuovo until 1864; locally Castèl Mèlå) is a comune in the province of Brescia, in Lombardy.

== Geography ==
It is in the plain southwest of Brescia, on the river Mella. It is bounded by the communes of Brescia, Flero, Capriano del Colle and Roncadelle.
