= Capriano del Colle =

Capriano del Colle Cavreà
- Comune
- Comune di Capriano del Colle
- Location within Italy Location within Lombardy
- Coordinates: 45°27′N 10°8′E
- Country: Italy
- Region: Lombardy
- Province: Brescia (BS)

Government
  - Mayor: Stefano Sala (League)

Area
  - Total: 13.97 km^{2} (5.39 sq mi)
- Elevation: 92 m (302 ft)

Population (30 November 2017)
  - Total: 4,627
  - Density: 331.2/km^{2} (857.8/sq mi)
- Demonym: Caprette
- Time zone: UTC+1 (CET)
  - Summer (DST): UTC+2 (CEST)
- Postal code: 25020
- Dialing code: 030
- Patron saint: St. Michael Archangel
- Saint day: 29 September
- Website: Official website

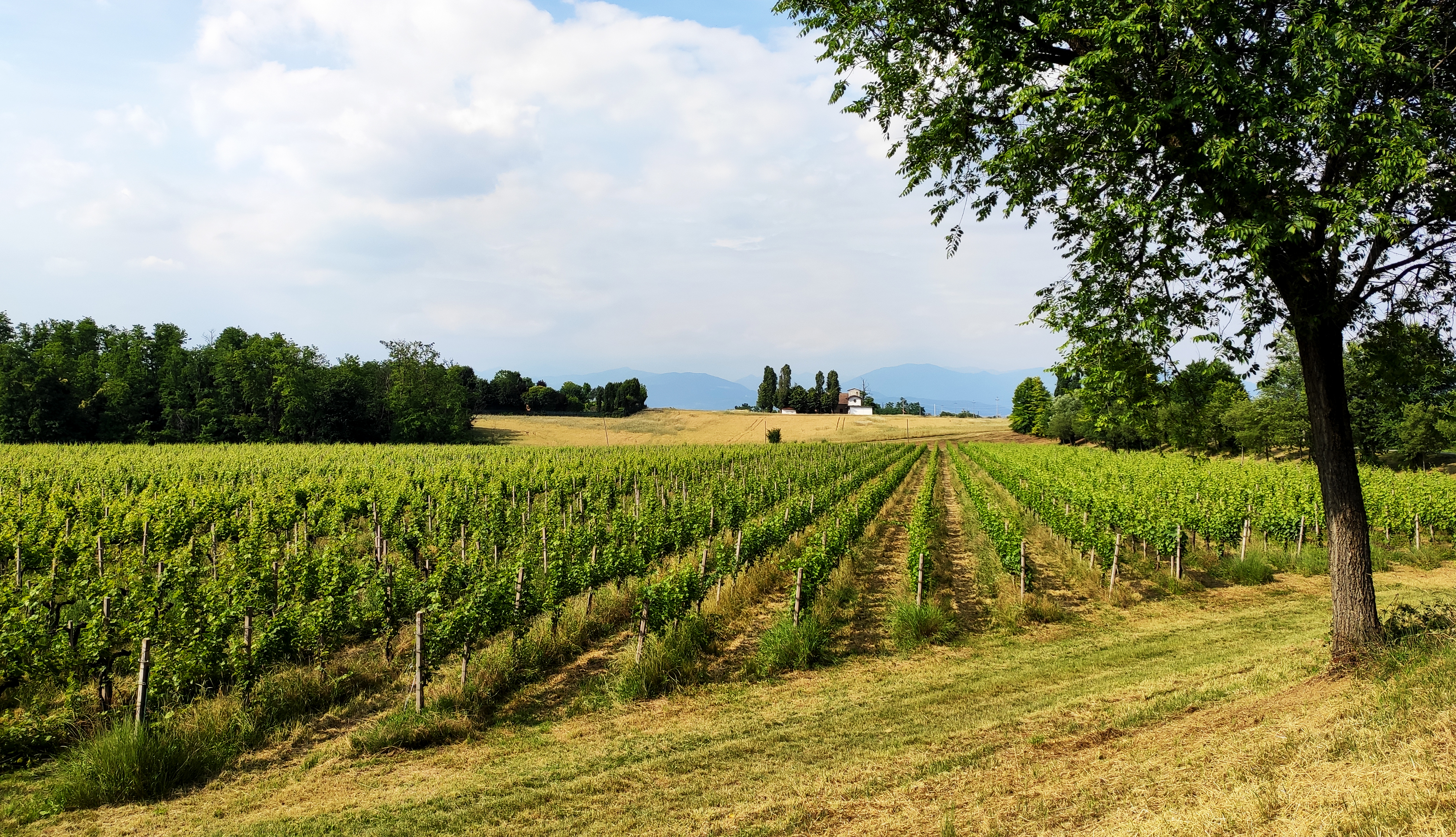
Capriano del Colle vigna.jpg

Capriano del Colle (Brescian: Cavreà) is a comune in the province of Brescia, Lombardy, northern Italy. It is bounded by other communes of Azzano Mella, Bagnolo Mella, Flero, Poncarale, Castel Mella and Dello. It is situated on the eastern slopes of Monte Netto, famous for the production of Clinto grapes.
