= Monte Netto =

Mountain in Italy

- Monte di Capriano
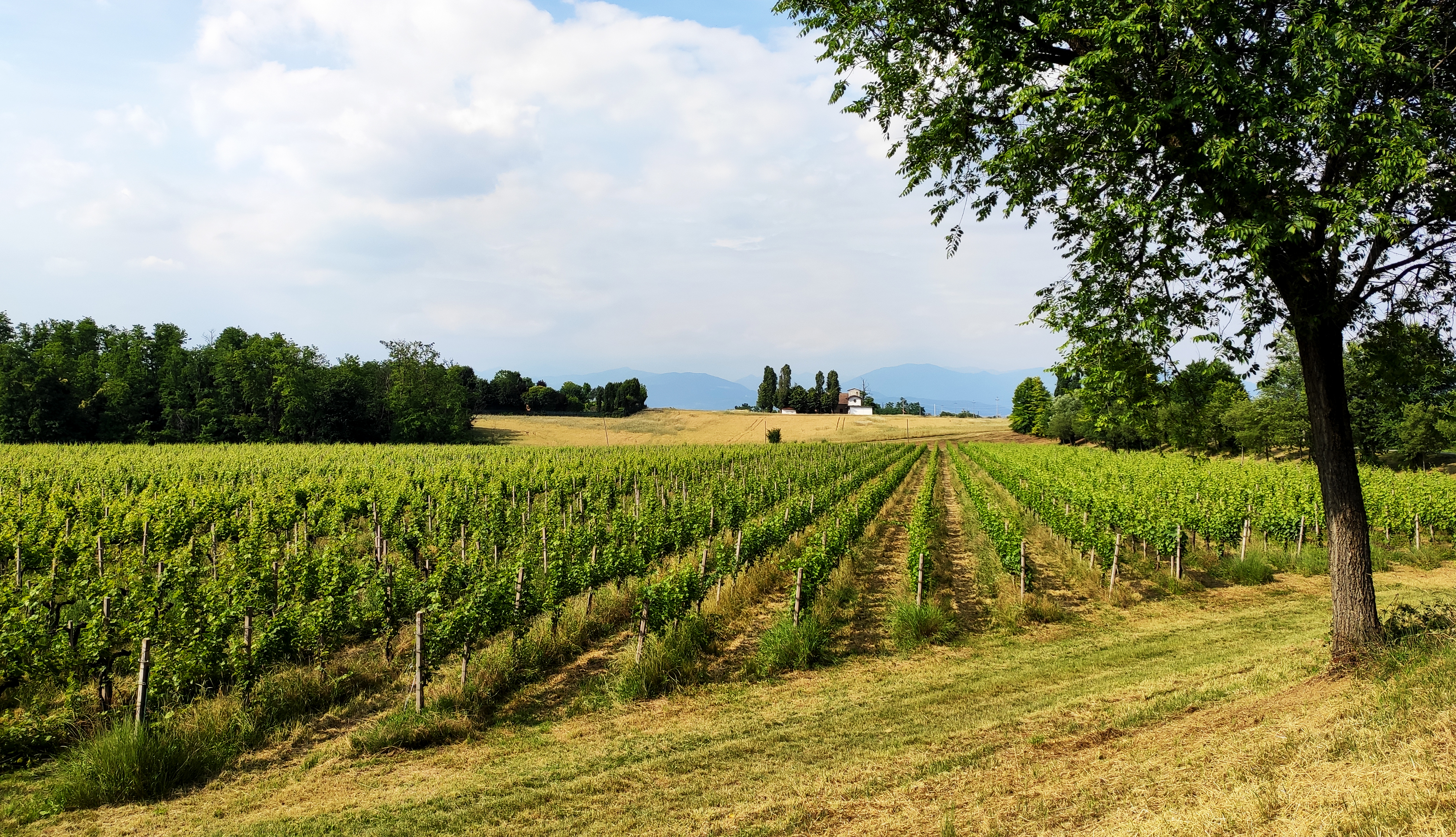
- Vineyards along the slopes of Mount Netto

Highest point
- Elevation: 133 m (436 ft)
- Coordinates: 45°28′05″N 10°07′48″E

Geography
- Location within Italy
- Country: Italy
- Province: Province of Brescia
- Region: Lombardy

Monte Netto, also called Monte di Capriano (in Brescian dialect Montenèt) is an isolated hill in the northern part of the Bassa Bresciana, located between the municipal territories of Capriano del Colle, Flero and Poncarale, which reaches a maximum height of 133 m asl.

Characterized by the cultivation of vines, it is an area of production of the Capriano del Colle DOC wines (Capriano del Colle Rosso, Capriano del Colle Rosso Riserva, Capriano del Colle Novello Rosso, Capriano del Colle Trebbiano and Capriano del Colle Trebbiano Frizzante) and the IGT Montenetto wines. Its particular geological shape has prevented extensive anthropization, allowing the maintenance of distinctive fauna and flora. For this reason, the hill area and its foothills are protected within the regional park known as Monte Netto.

== Origin of the name ==
It is a hilly location that was cleared to make room for vineyard plantations. Traces of woodland areas can still be found at the foot of Montenetto, in the Capriano area where the Bosco delle Colombere still exists, and at the opposite end, on the territory of Poncarale where one finds near the Church il Bosco del Castagneto (el castagner) accessible from the road of the same name and clearly visible upon entering Poncarale from Brescia. The oronym Monte-Netto thus derives from the scarcity of vegetation that has characterized its vast summit in recent centuries.

== Geologic features ==
The maximum elevation of the relief is 133 m asl, surging from the surrounding plain for an elevation varying between 12 and 33 meters. It extends longitudinally for four kilometers, while from north to south it is 2.5 kilometers long.

Wide and low, the relief is the result of underground movement that occurred during the Riss glaciation. The geological movement flows under the ground in a northeast direction to re-emerge near the Castenedolo Plateau.

The summit clays of Monte Netto would date to the earliest Quaternary phase and would be yellowish-blue in color. The lower layer is composed of gray sand with mostly calcareous coarse lenses of gravel. The uppermost layer, of alluvial origin as a result of river deposition from the valleys, is succeeded by a section of several hundred meters consisting of the marine sediments that composed the Po Valley at the end of the Cenozoic period.

== Fauna and vegetation ==
The hilly relief has low anthropization, which is mainly concentrated near the two historic towns of Capriano del Colle, to the southwest, and Poncarale, to the east, as well as from the cascine a corte.

A large part of the area is planted with vines, being an area of production of wines protected by the Vini del Montenetto consortium, which protects the wines of the Capriano del Colle DOC. A modest portion was used in the past for gravel extraction.

The Colombaie forest is the most significant arboreal patch in terms of its extent and the richness of its vegetation. It covers fourteen hectares; within it dwells specimens of sessile oak and pedunculate oak trees, as well as hornbeam, manna ash and chestnut. There are limited presences of hazel, dogwood, spindle, field maple, privet and hawthorn. Shrubs include ivy, as well as butcher's broom and lesser periwinkle, with a few rare ferns.

In the more modest and outer wooded belts of the relief, locust trees and elderberry plants are more common.

Given the aforementioned tree characteristics, microfauna is widespread on Mount Netto.

== Anthropization ==
In the 10th century the territory of Monte Netto was part of the property of the Brescia Cathedral chapter. In the 15th century it was ceded to the Bornati family. The municipality and parish of Poncarale contested this assignment, claiming civic rights to the high ground, such as herbage and the right to collect firewood. The agreement, reached in 1454, stipulated that the Bornati would remain owners of Monte Netto, but that the municipality of Poncarale would get two hundred piò in return.

With the Bornati's acquisition, the phase of deforestation and land clearing began. Given the scarcity of irrigation, the main crops were vines and flax; pastoralism was also active.

During the nineteenth century, roads were built that connected the Torrazza and San Bernardo farmsteads to the towns of Capriano and Poncarale, replacing the previous rolling and country roads. In 1912, the municipality of Poncarale, under the administration of Mayor Bertazzoli, distributed the 200 piò of the medieval endowment to several private citizens.

In 2007, the Monte Netto regional park was established to protect its distinctive features.

== See also ==
- Capriano del Colle
- Poncarale

== Bibliography ==
- Stefano Armiraglio; Fabio Gandellini; Marco Mosconi (2006). "Il paesaggio vegetazionale". Brescia e il Dipartimento del Mella. Atlante del paesaggio bresciano sulle sponde del fiume Mella. Brescia: Provincia di Brescia. pp. 107–145. [ISBN unspecified]
- Giorgio Ferraresi, ed. (2004). Istituzione del parco regionale agricolo del Monte Netto - Studio di fattibilità. Milano: Regione Lombardia. [ISBN unspecified]
- Eleandro Maghini (2005). Poncarale tra cronaca e storia. Brescia: La Rosa. [ISBN unspecified]
- Attilio Mazza (1986). Il Bresciano - Volume IV. La pianura. Bergamo: Bortolotti. [ISBN unspecified]
