= Piffione =

- Frazione
- Location of Piffione in Italy
- Coordinates: 45.488753°N 10.238100°E
- Country: Italy
- Region: Lombardy
- Province: Brescia (BS)
- Comune: Borgosatollo
- Elevation: 115 m (377 ft)
- Time zone: UTC+1 (CET)
  - Summer (DST): UTC+2 (CEST)
- Postal code: 25010
- Dialing code: 030
- Patron saint: San Michele Arcangelo
- Website: Official website

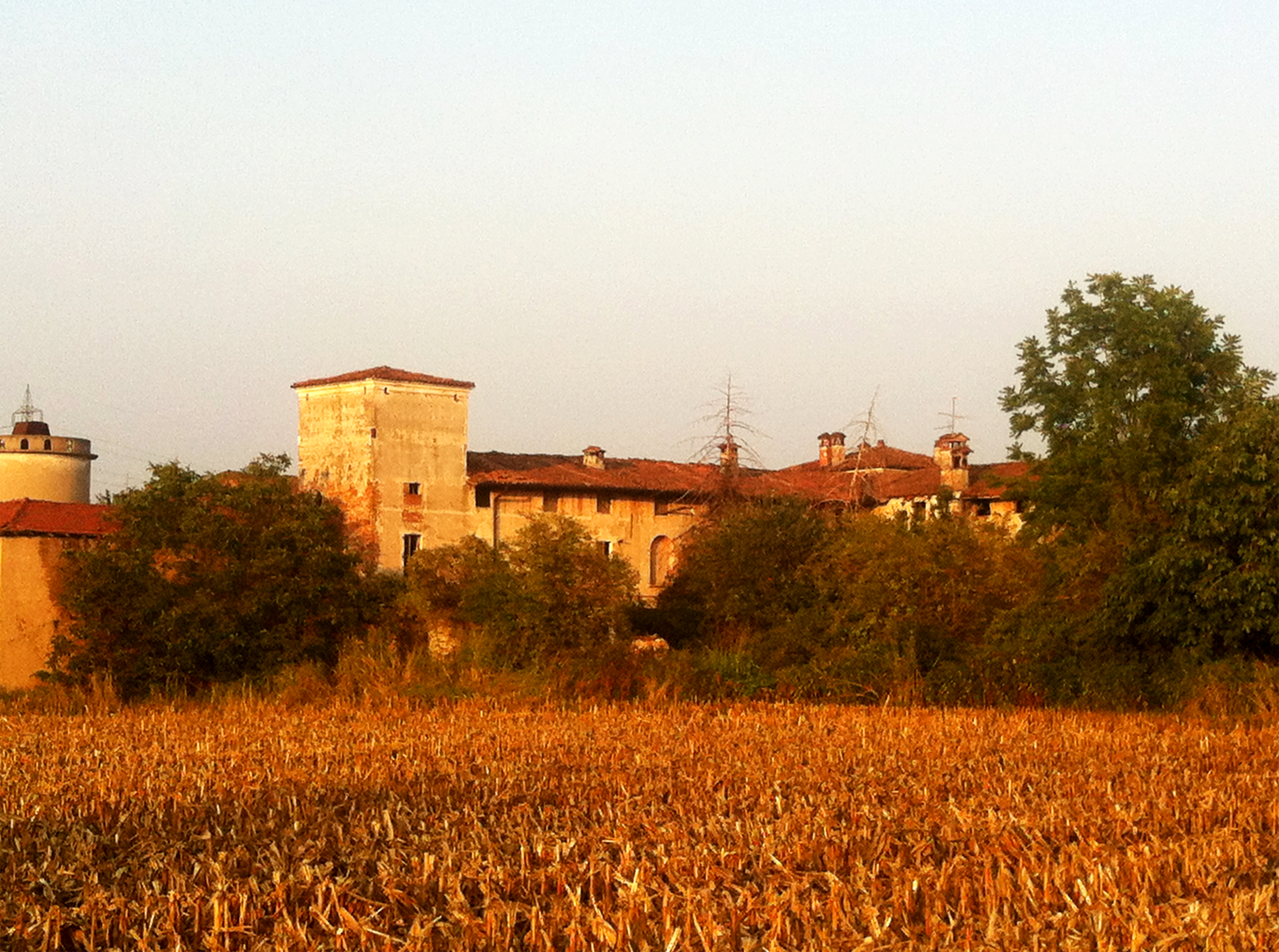
Modonesi Farmhouse, Piffione

Piffione (Piffiù in Lombard language) is a hamlet of Borgosatollo, an Italian small village in the province of Brescia, in Lombardy.

== Geography ==
It is located on the provincial road 23 between Borgosatollo and Montirone.

The position of the hamlet is attested by some historical maps since the seventeenth century.

The village is adjacent to the irrigation ditch Piffiona, from which it gets its name.

== Main sights ==
- Church of St. Michael the Archangel, probably of Longobard origin
- Modonesi's Palace
