= San Zeno Naviglio =

- Comune
- Comune di San Zeno Naviglio
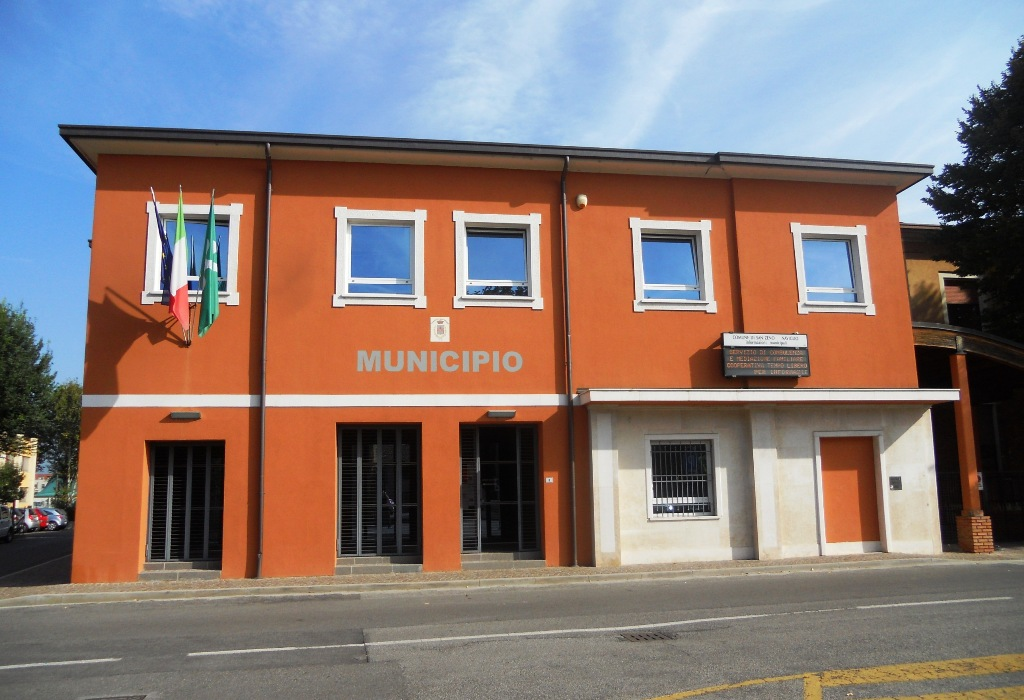
- Town hall

- Location within Italy Location within Lombardy
- Coordinates: 45°29′28″N 10°13′3″E
- Country: Italy
- Region: Lombardy
- Province: Brescia
- Frazioni: Aspes, Caselle, Garza, Sörèc

Area
  - Total: 6 km^{2} (2.3 sq mi)
- Highest elevation: 60 m (200 ft)
- Lowest elevation: 50 m (160 ft)

Population (2011)
  - Total: 4,726
  - Density: 790/km^{2} (2,000/sq mi)
- Demonym: Sanzenesi
- Time zone: UTC+1 (CET)
  - Summer (DST): UTC+2 (CEST)
- Postal code: 25010
- Dialing code: 030
- Patron saint: San Zenone
- Saint day: 9 December
- Website: Official website

San Zeno Naviglio (Brescian: Sàn Zé Naéle) is a town and comune in the province of Brescia, Lombardy. It is bounded by communes of Brescia, Borgosatollo, Flero and Poncarale.

It is located 6 km south of Brescia.

== History ==
Human settlements in the area date back to the Roman Empire (Roman tombstone near the Cascina Pontevica) and Lombards dominion. The first documented town was established in the 15th century; the locality was called Tregonzo or Tregoncio which derives from Latin Inter Gurgites.

Under the Venetian Republic (15th and 18th century, the town was organized in the Quadra of Mairano in 1483, then it passed to the Quadra of Bagnolo. It was occupied by the army from Milan during the war of Ferrara.

In the ephemeral Napoleonic Repubblica di Brescia (1797), the commune belonged to the Cantone della Garza Orientale. During the Napoleonic dominion, the commune was abolited: town was administrated by Brescia directly. In 1814, Austrians restored the municipality autonomy. In 1881 during an administrative reform of the Kingdom of Italy, the commune was renamed San Zeno Naviglio.

In 1817, a bridge was constructed near the Sörèc zone (1817). In 1866, the Brescia–Cremona railway was opened along with its railway station. In 1893, the railway construction opened a link to Piadena and Parma.

After Second World War the population grew. It reached 2,000 in the 1960s and 3,000 in the 1980s.

== Economy ==
Agriculture is the main source of the economy and within the commune. There are iron and steel plants.

Manufacturing company expanded and opened plants like SETA in the 1950s and Duferdofin in the 1970s.

== Sites of interest ==
- Cascina Pietà
- Cascina Naviglio
- Cascina Pontevica

== Transportation ==
San Zeno is served by San Zeno-Folzano railway station, so named because it also serves the village of Folzano in the municipality of Brescia. The station is a junction of the railway lines Brescia–Cremona and Brescia–Parma.

== Gallery ==
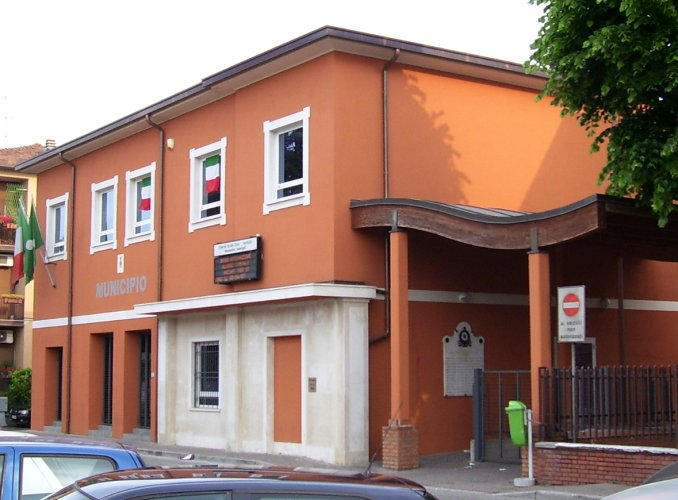
Town Hall

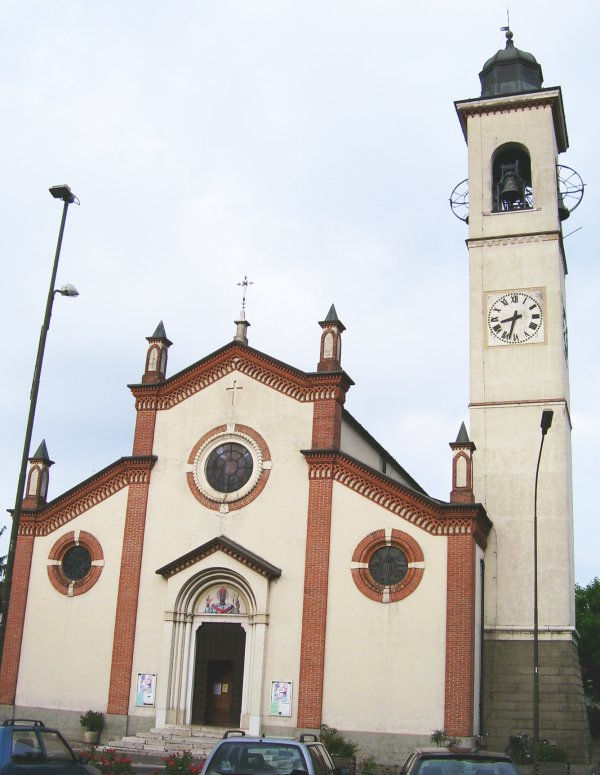
Parish

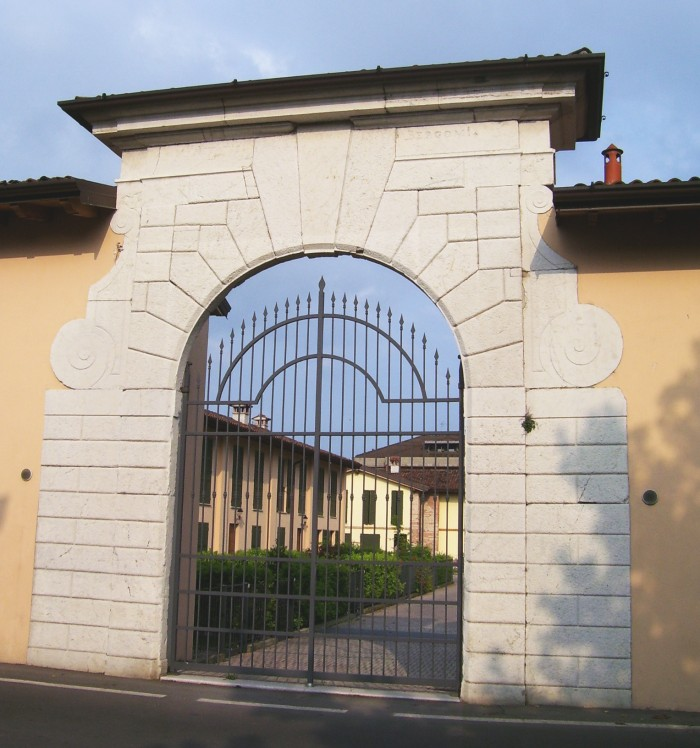
Cascina Pietà
