= Francesca Lechi =

Italian revolutionary and socialite (1773–1806)

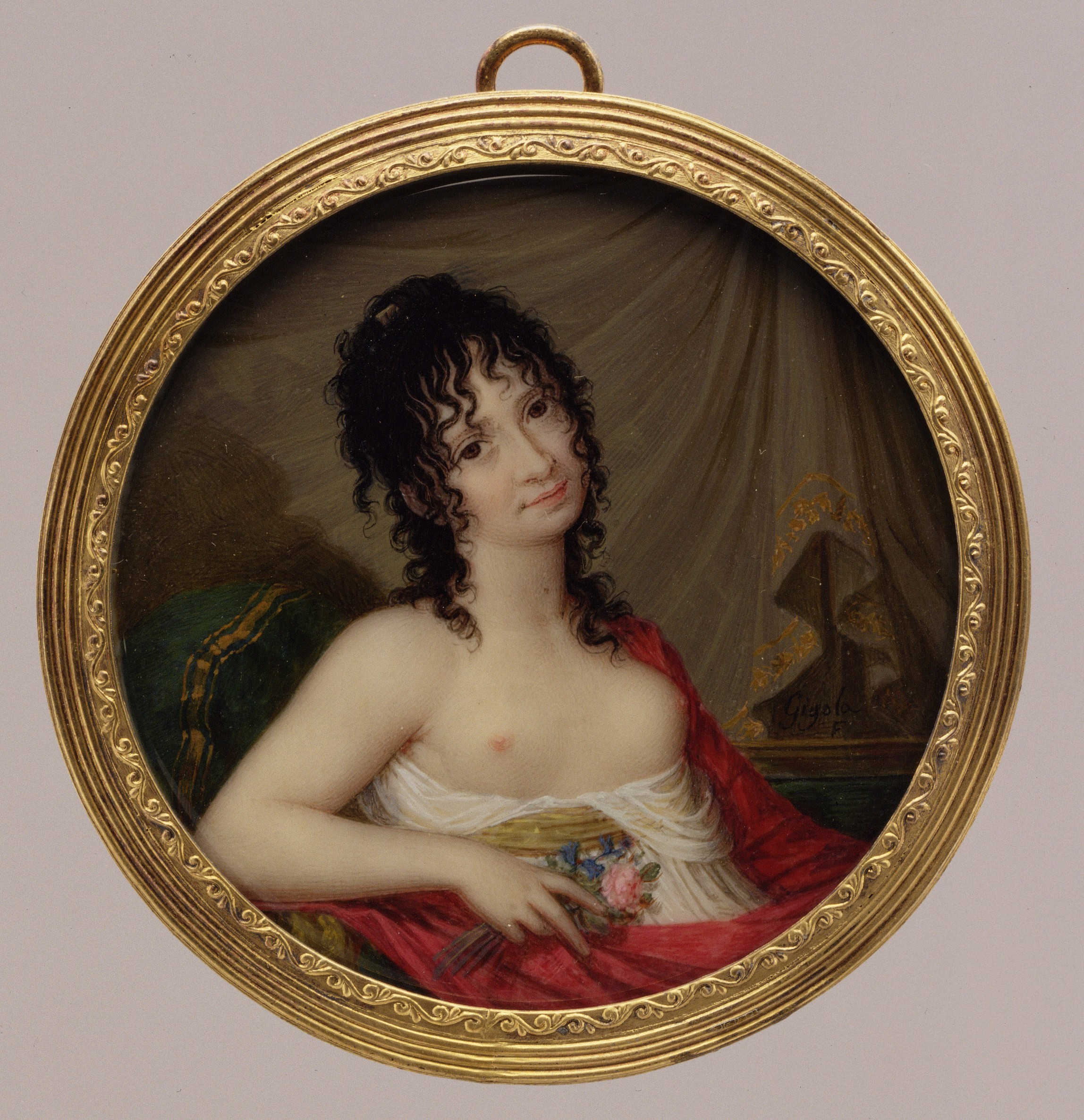
- Portrait of Lechi by Giovanni Battista Gigola. held in the collection of the Metropolitan Museum of Art
- Born: 1773; Brescia, Republic of Venice
- Died: 1806 (aged 33); Milan, Kingdom of Italy
- Other names: Fanni
- Occupations: Revolutionary; socialite
- Spouse: Francesco Ghirardi (m. 1793)
- Children: 1

Francesca Ghirardi Lechi (1773–1806) was an Italian revolutionary and figure in Milanese society. She was nicknamed "Fanni."

== Early life ==
Lechi was born in Brescia, Lombardy and was a member of the noble Lechi family. She was the daughter of Count Faustino Lechi of Brescia and Countess Doralice Bielli and had five brothers: General Giuseppe Lechi (1766–1836), Angelo Lechi (1769–1850), Bernardino Lechi (1775–1869), General Teodoro Lechi (1778–1866) and Luigi Lechi (1786–1867).

Lechi was educated at the College of Salò, then at Collegio Castiglioni Brugnatelli in Pavia.

== Career ==
Lechi took part in revolutionary activity in Brescia. On 16 March 1797, she purchased silks in white, red and green from three different shops in order to avoid suspicion, to use as material for a tricolour flag. The flag was to be hoisted in Broletto by her brother Giuseppe during the Brescian revolution, activity which lead to the creation of the Republic of Brescia, a temporary French client republic, on 18 March 1797. This symbol of Italian unification later became the tricolour flag of Italy.

Lechi moved with her husband to Milan, where she became a society figure and loved to dress as an Amazon warrior or her literary heroes at balls.

Lechi met Joachim Murat, Napoleon Bonaparte's right-hand man and the first King of Naples of the House of Murat, at a ball in Milan. She became his mistress, and followed him to Paris before returning to her husband.

In 1801, she met the realist writer Stendhal in Milan. Stendhal described her in his book Vie de Napoléon as:

French: "La comtesse Gherardi, fille du comte Lecchi, avait peut-être les plus beaux yeux de Brescia, le pays de beaux yeux"
Translation: "La Comtesse Gherardi, daughter of Comte Lecchi, has the most beautiful eyes of Brescia, the place of beautiful eyes"

Lechi died in 1806. The date and place of her burial are unknown.

== Personal life ==
Lechi ran away from home to marry Francesco Ghirardi, a lawyer from the Republic of Venice, on 21 August 1793. He was a family friend and twenty years her senior. They had a daughter named Carolina.

== Representations ==
A miniature portrait of Lechi on ivory, by Giovanni Battista Gigola, which shows her bare-breasted in a provocative pose, is held in the collection of the Metropolitan Museum of Art in New York City.

An oil painting of Lechi with her daughter Carolina was painted c. 1800–1801.
