= Bagnolo Mella =

- Comune
- Città di Bagnolo Mella
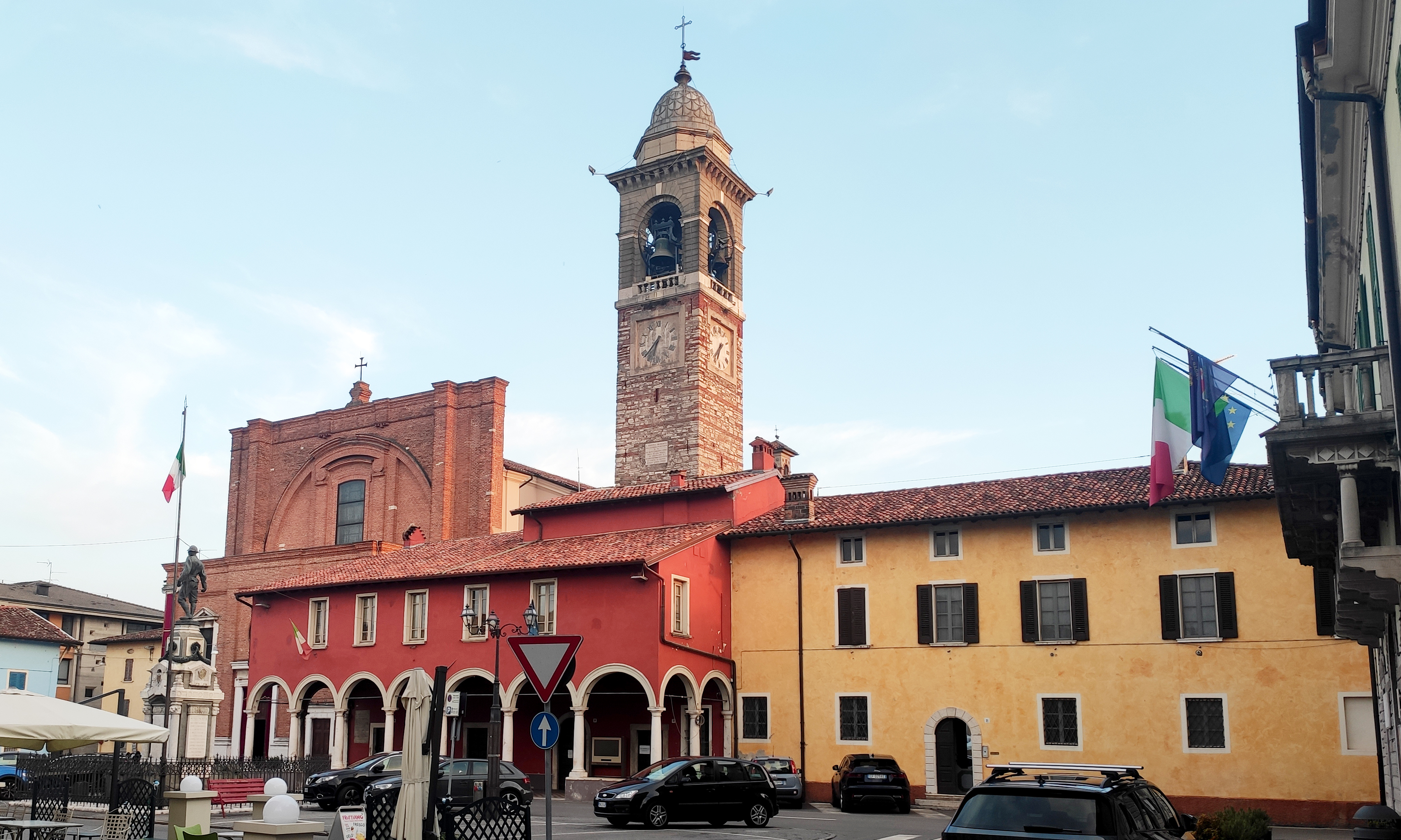
- View of Bagnolo Mella

- Location within Italy Location within Lombardy
- Coordinates: 45°26′N 10°11′E
- Country: Italy
- Region: Lombardy
- Province: Brescia
- Frazioni: Capriano del Colle, Dello, Ghedi, Leno, Manerbio, Montirone, Offlaga, Poncarale

Area
  - Total: 31 km^{2} (12 sq mi)
- Elevation: 85 m (279 ft)

Population (2011)
  - Total: 12,985
  - Density: 420/km^{2} (1,100/sq mi)
- Demonym: Bagnolesi
- Time zone: UTC+1 (CET)
  - Summer (DST): UTC+2 (CEST)
- Postal code: 25021
- Dialing code: 030
- ISTAT code: 017009
- Patron saint: Sts. Processo and Martiniano
- Saint day: 2 July
- Website: Official website

Bagnolo Mella (Brescian: Bagnöl) is a comune and town in the province of Brescia, in Lombardy.

== History ==
During the Roman era, Bagnolo Mella (lat. Balneolum) was crossed by the Via Brixiana, a Roman consular road which connected Cremona (lat. Cremona) to Brescia (lat. Brixia), from which Roman roads passed and then branched out towards the entire Cisalpine Gaul.

== Transportation ==
Bagnolo Mella has a railway station on the Brescia–Cremona line.

== Twin towns ==
Bagnolo Mella is twinned with:

- Brie-Comte-Robert, France
- Stadtbergen, Germany
