= Teodoro Lechi =

Italian general (1778–1866)

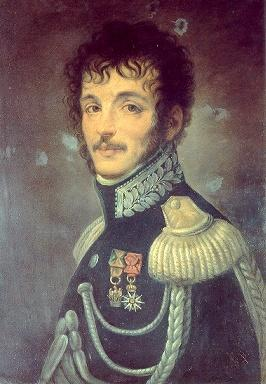
- Born: 16 January 1778; Brescia, Republic of Venice
- Died: 2 May 1866 (aged 88) Milan, Kingdom of Italy
- Allegiance: (Kingdom of Italy (Napoleonic)) Kingdom of Italy; Kingdom of Sardinia (1848–50)
- Rank: Division general (Napoleonic Italy); Full General (Kingdom of Sardinia)
- Conflicts: Napoleonic Wars; War of the Third Coalition; Battle of Austerlitz; War of the Fifth Coalition; Battle of Wagram; French invasion of Russia; First Italian War of Independence; Five Days of Milan

Teodoro Lechi (16 January 1778 – 2 May 1866) was an Italian general, a Jacobin and a military advisor to King Carlo Alberto of Sardinia. He was the brother of Giuseppe Lechi, a brilliant and famous Napoleonic general, and Angelo, also a Napoleonic officer.

== Early life ==
Teodoro Lechi was born in Brescia, the 14th son of 19 of Fausto Lechi and his wife Doralice Bielli. His sister Francesca Lechi was an Italian revolutionary, figure in Milanese society and mistress of Joachim Murat.

== Career ==
Lechi enlisted in the Brescian Legion on 18 March 1797, at the time of the city revolution. He immediately sided with Napoleon and entered new Presidential Guard of the Italian Republic that eventually become known as the "Guardia Reale" (Royal Guard), achieving the rank of colonel in 1803.

Lechi spent nearly two years (1803–1805) in Paris, where he received conventional military training. Returning to Lombardy, he became commander of the Grenadiers of the Royal Guard of the Kingdom of Italy (king: Napoleon; Viceroy: Eugène de Beauharnais). The same year he was made Esquire of the King of Italy and received from Napoleon himself the Eagles and the banners of the Guard. Lechi fought at Austerlitz, and then took part in campaigns in Veneto, Dalmatia, Albania, and Hungary, becoming brigade general. After the battle of Wagram he was awarded the title Baron of the French Empire. On 10 February 1812 he left for the Campaign of Russia, participating in every battle of the retreat.

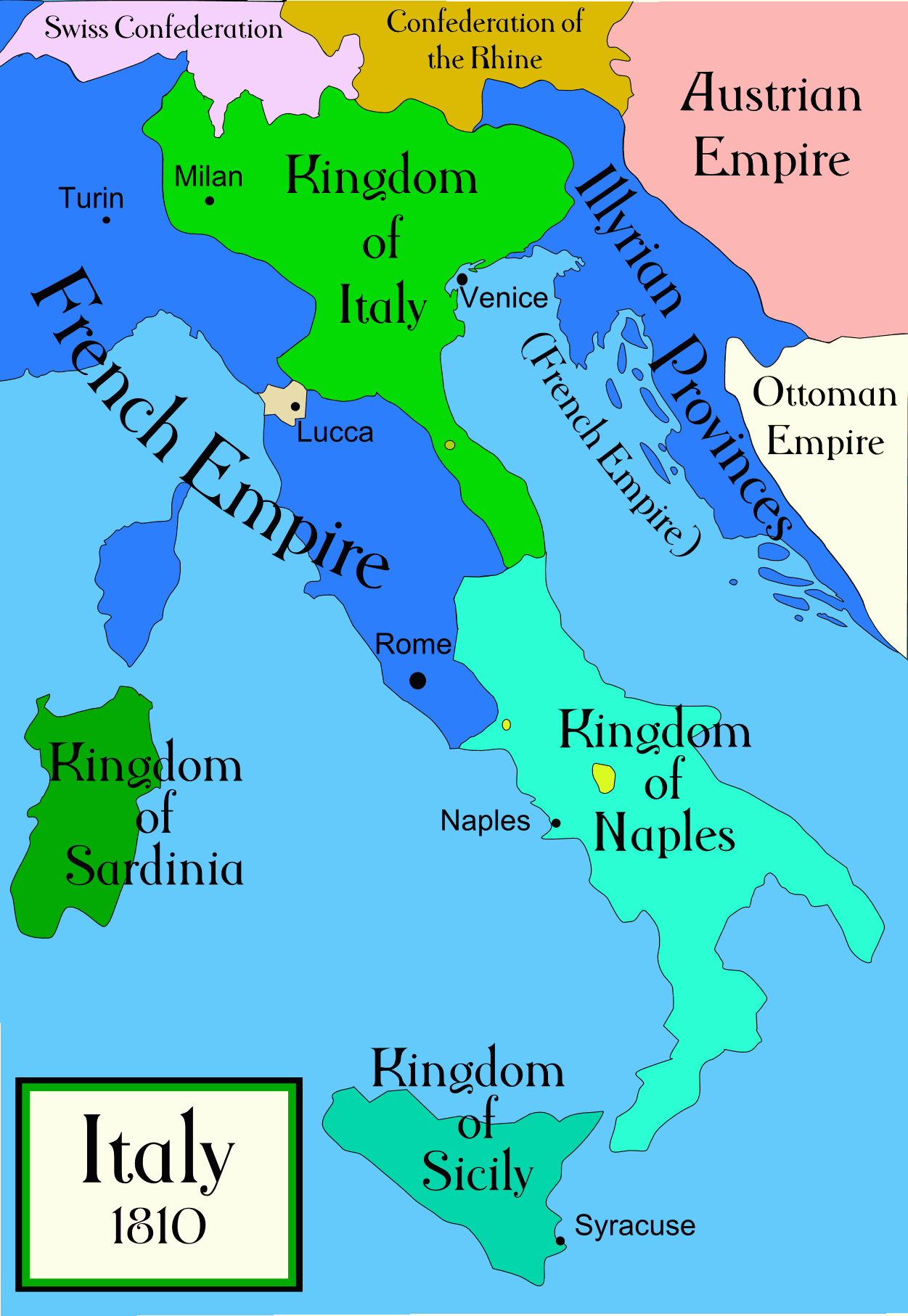
Italy and Illyrian Provinces in 1810

In 1813 and 1814 he took part also in the war against Austria, despite awareness of the decline of the Napoleonic age, as commanding officer of the IV Division of the Army of Italy. On 27 April 1814, after the armistice signed by Eugène de Beauharnais, Lechi was protagonist of a somewhat singular ritual: for fidelity to the Guard, he burned the banners and the Eagles (except for one Eagle, that he jealously would conserve for more the 30 years), and ate the remaining ashes with his own officers.

Refusing to swear loyalty to the Austrian Empire, Teodoro retired to private life.

During the Five Days of Milan the now 72 years old Teodoro Lechi returned to action: on 28 March 1848 he assumed the command of the Civic Guard. A man of experience, he advised the Minister of the war to make use of the railway lines in order to transport the troops and to assault Verona; the suggestion, which was not acted on, would have probably changed the fortunes of the First Italian War of Independence.

At the end of the war Teodoro Lechi moved to Piedmont, where he was appointed General of the Army by King Carlo Alberto.

For gratitude, the former Jacobin veteran delivered to the King of Sardinia the only remaining Napoleonic Eagle which survived the ritual of 1814. This eagle is now preserved inside the Museo del Risorgimento in Milan.

In 1859 General Lechi returned to Milan, now an Italian city liberated from the Austrians.

== Death and legacy ==
He died in Milan in 1866 at the age of 88.

Teodoro Lechi was portrayed by Stendhal in "The Charterhouse of Parma" (1839) as "Count of Pietranera". Napoleon Bonaparte informally called Teodoro "mon beau général".

== Decorations ==
- Officer of the Légion d'honneur
- Knight of the Order of the Iron Crown
