= Montirone =

Montirone Montirù
- Comune
- Comune di Montirone
- Location within Italy Location within Lombardy
- Coordinates: 45°27′N 10°14′E
- Country: Italy
- Region: Lombardy
- Province: Brescia (BS)
- Frazioni: Bagnolo Mella, Borgosatollo, Ghedi, Poncarale

Area
  - Total: 10.3 km^{2} (4.0 sq mi)
- Elevation: 99 m (325 ft)

Population (2011)
  - Total: 5,139
  - Density: 499/km^{2} (1,290/sq mi)
- Demonym: Montironesi
- Time zone: UTC+1 (CET)
  - Summer (DST): UTC+2 (CEST)
- Postal code: 25010
- Dialing code: 030
- ISTAT code: 017114
- Patron saint: Saint Lorenzo
- Saint day: 10 August
- Website: Official website

Montirone (Brescian: Montirù) is a town and comune in the province of Brescia, in Lombardy, Italy.
