= Castenedolo =

Castenedolo Castignidol
- Comune
- Comune di Castenedolo
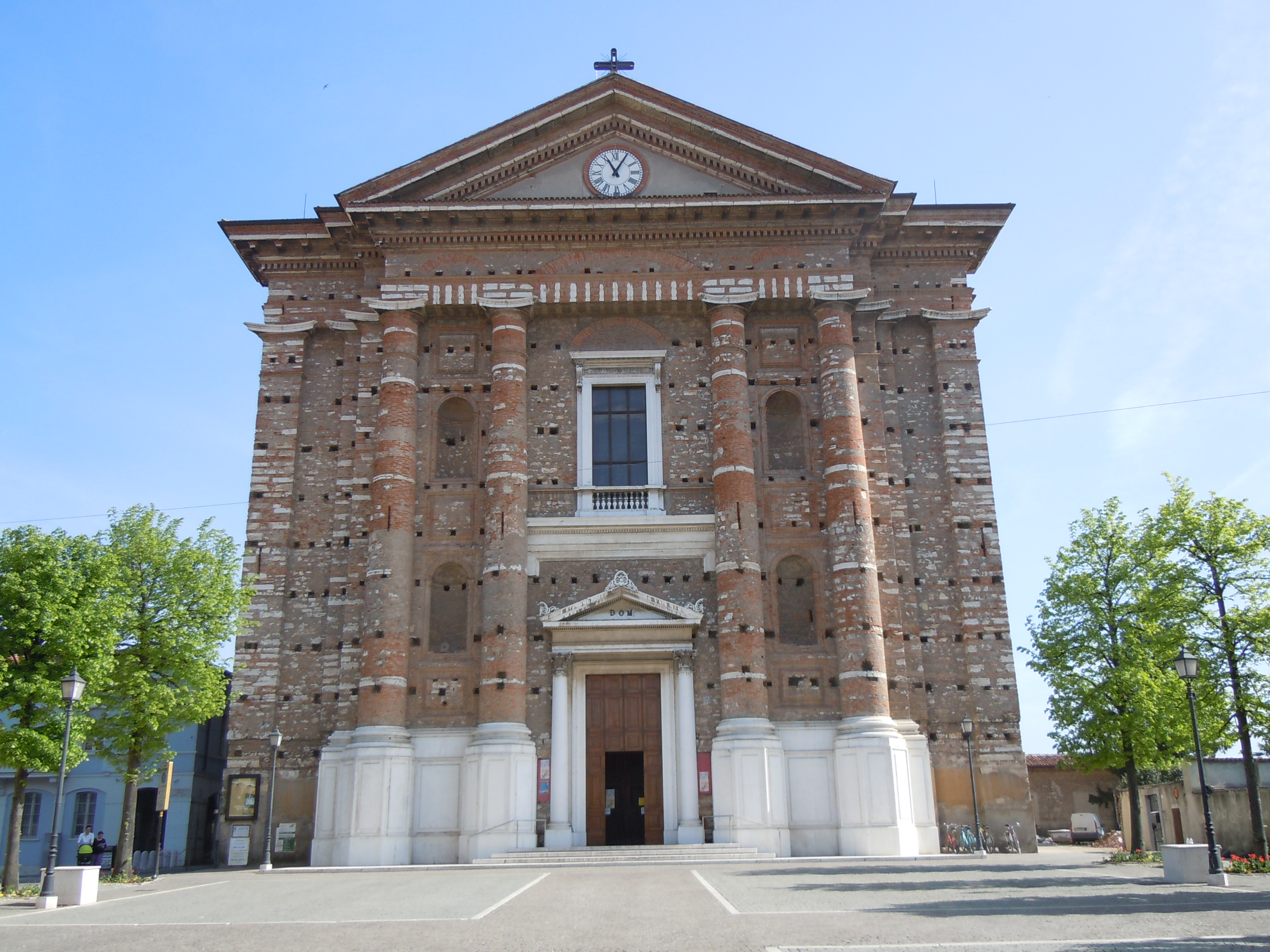

- Location within Italy Location within Lombardy
- Coordinates: 45°32′N 10°14′E
- Country: Italy
- Region: Lombardy
- Province: Brescia (BS)

Government
  - Mayor: Pierluigi Bianchini (Democratic Party)

Area
  - Total: 26 km^{2} (10 sq mi)
- Elevation: 150 m (490 ft)

Population (2011)
  - Total: 11,342
  - Density: 440/km^{2} (1,100/sq mi)
- Demonym: Castenedolesi
- Time zone: UTC+1 (CET)
  - Summer (DST): UTC+2 (CEST)
- Postal code: 25014
- Dialing code: 030
- Patron saint: Saint Bartolomeo
- Saint day: August 24

Castenedolo (Brescian: Castignidol) is a comune in the province of Brescia, in Lombardy. It is bounded by other communes of Montichiari and San Zeno Naviglio. The commune is situated in the plain southeast of Brescia.

== Twin towns ==
Castenedolo is twinned with:

- Gradačac, Bosnia and Herzegovina
