= Flero =

Flero Flér
- Comune
- Comune di Flero
- Location within Italy Location within Lombardy
- Coordinates: 45°28′N 10°11′E
- Country: Italy
- Region: Lombardy
- Province: Province of Brescia (BS)

Area
  - Total: 9 km^{2} (3.5 sq mi)

Population (2011)
  - Total: 8,643
  - Density: 960/km^{2} (2,500/sq mi)
- Demonym: Fleresi
- Time zone: UTC+1 (CET)
  - Summer (DST): UTC+2 (CEST)
- Postal code: 25020
- Dialing code: 030
- Website: Official website

Flero (Brescian: Flér) is a comune in the province of Brescia, in Lombardy.

== Notable people ==
- Andrea Pirlo, professional footballer

== See also ==
- Monte Netto

== Gallery ==
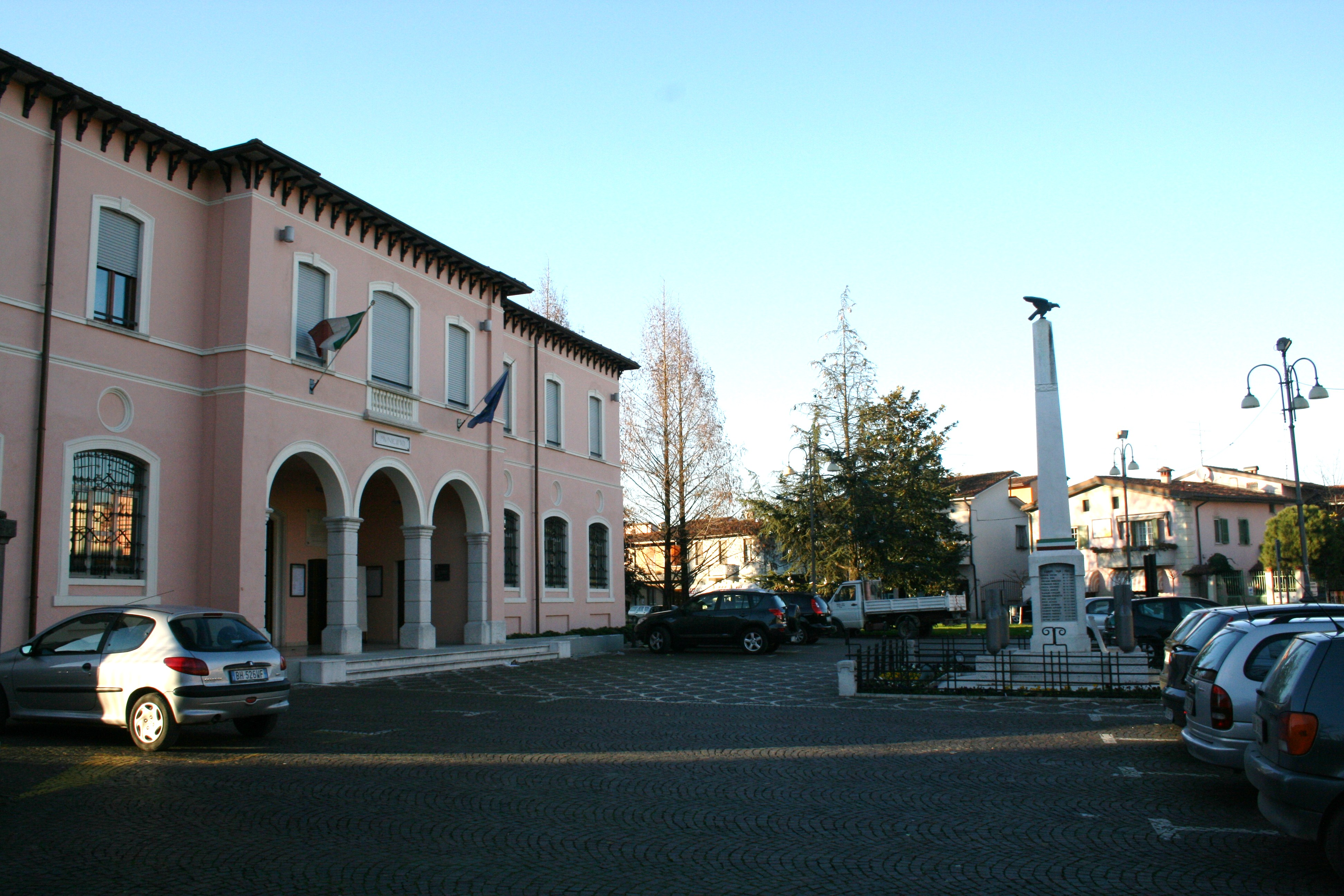
Flero town hall

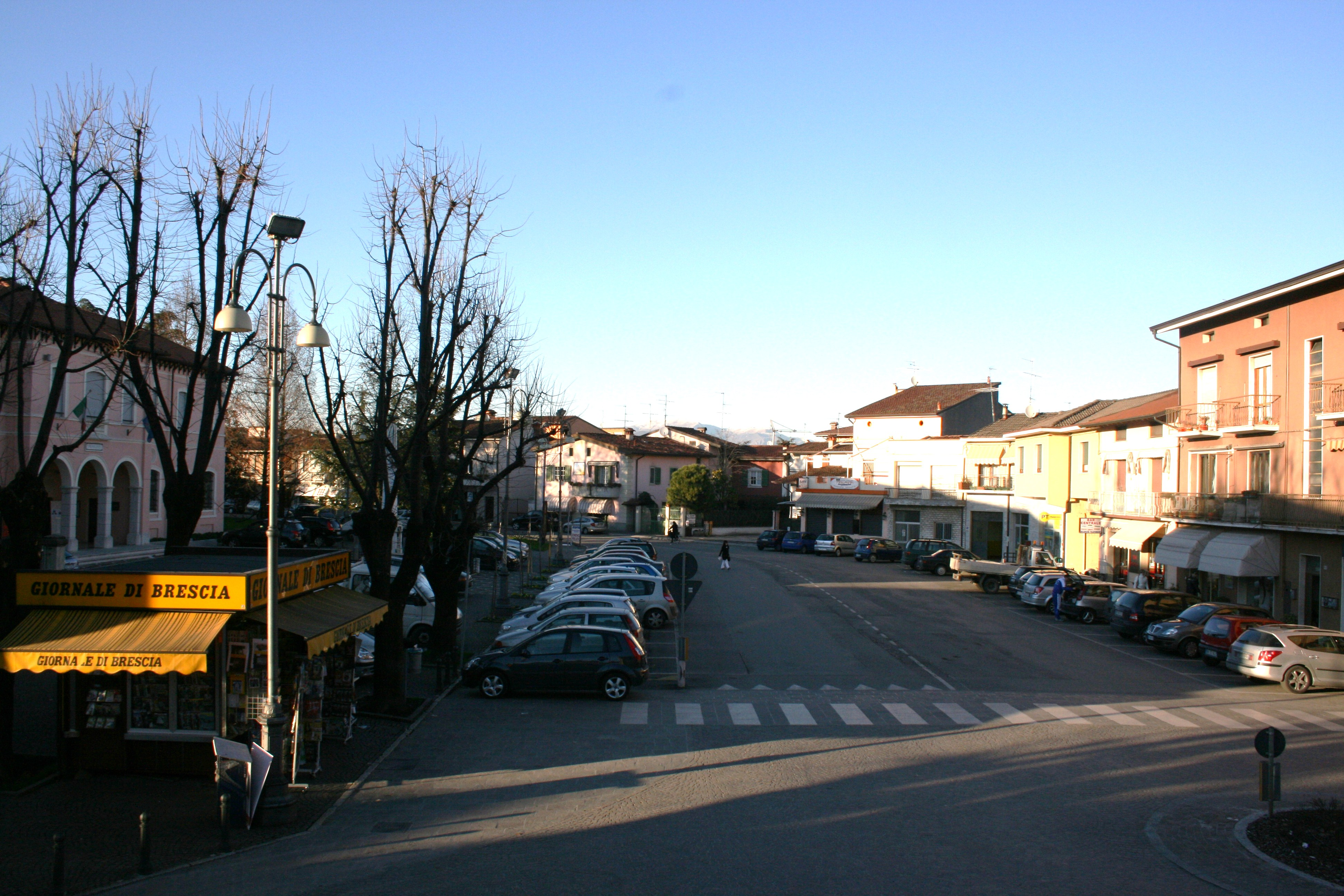
Flero square

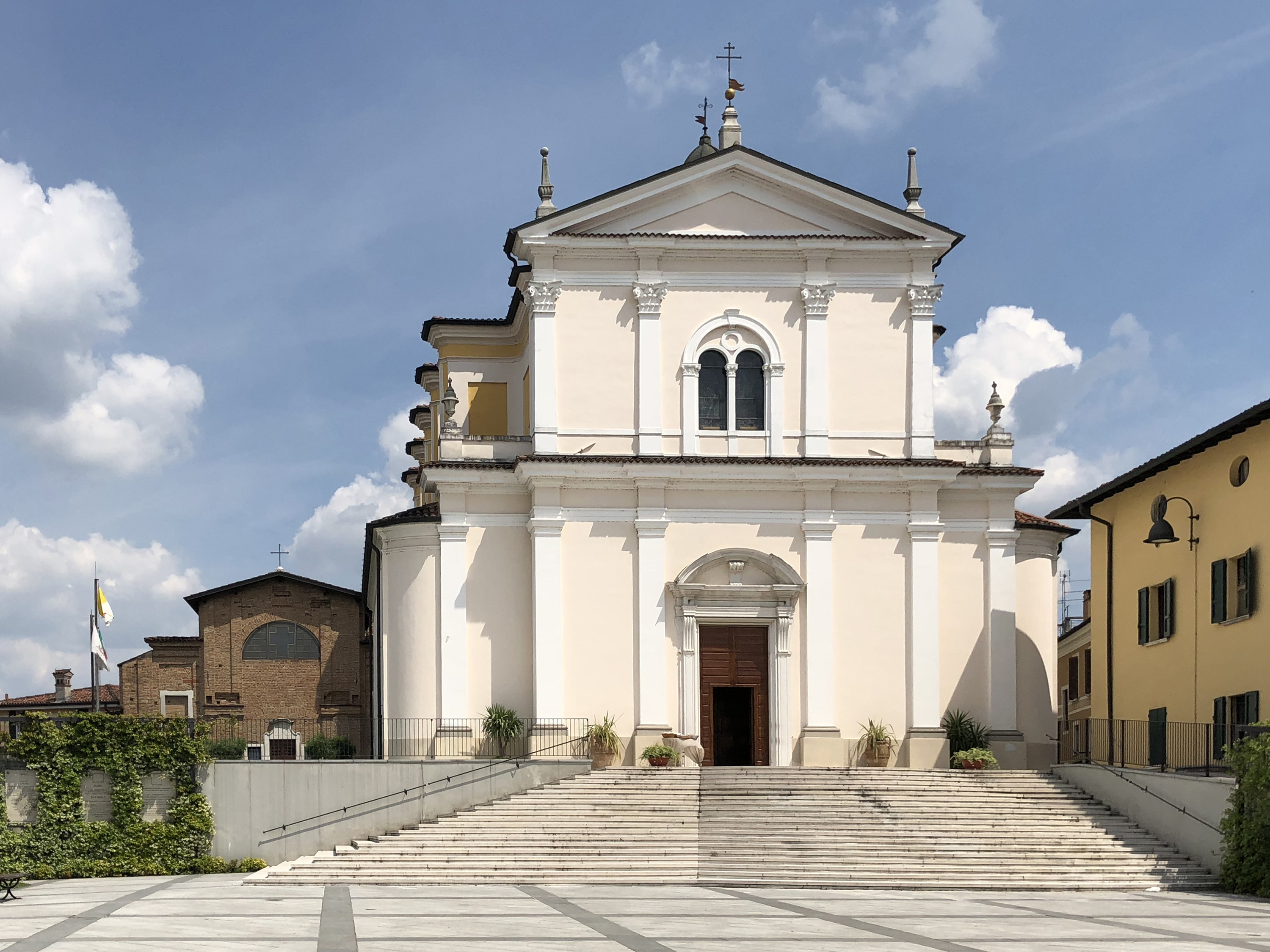
Saint Paul's church in Flero
