= Poncarale =

Poncarale Poncaràl
- Comune
- Comune di Poncarale
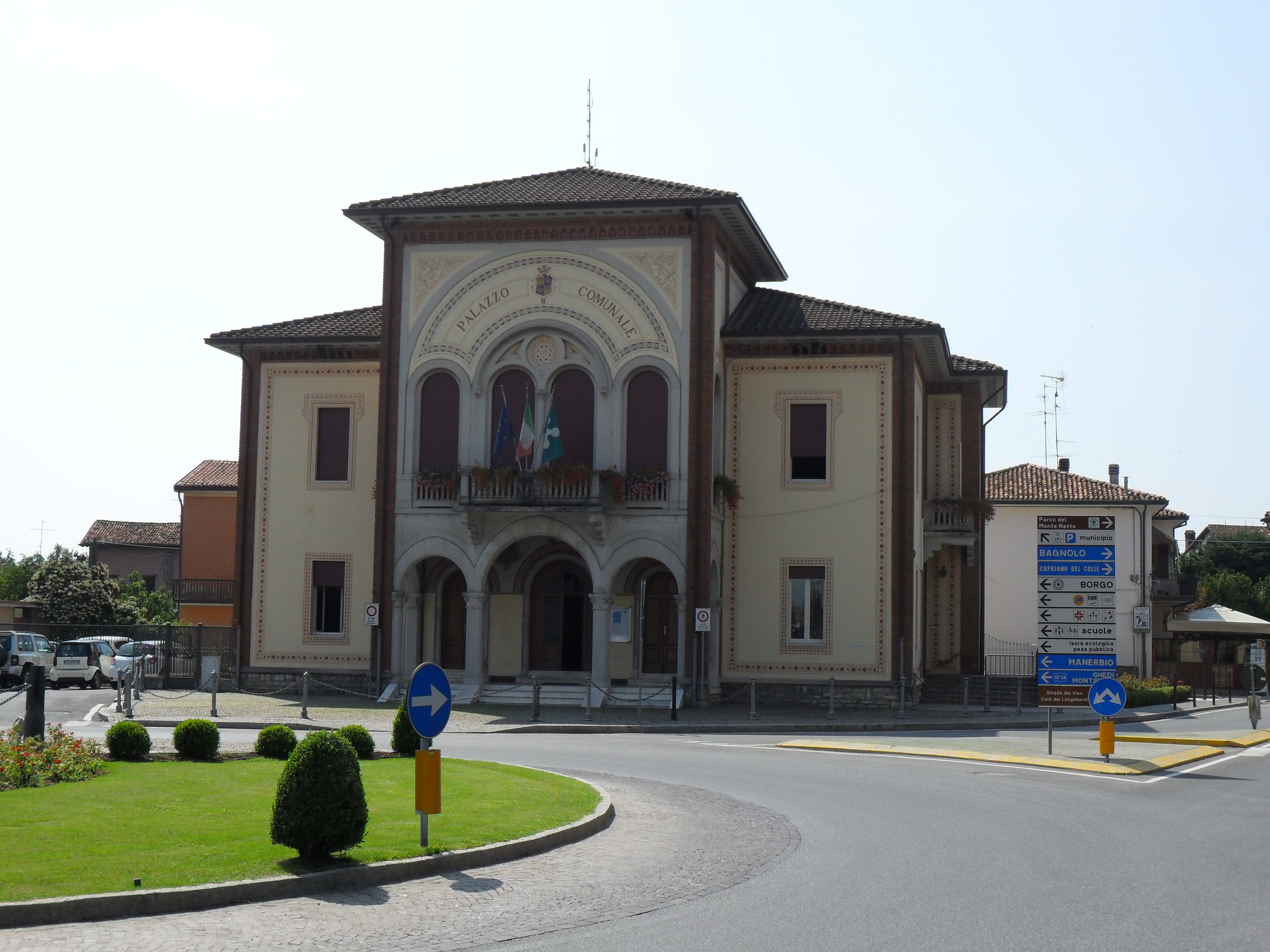

- Location within Italy Location within Lombardy
- Coordinates: 45°28′N 10°11′E
- Country: Italy
- Region: Lombardy
- Province: Brescia (BS)
- Frazioni: Borgo Poncarale

Area
  - Total: 12 km^{2} (4.6 sq mi)

Population (2011)
  - Total: 5,311
  - Density: 440/km^{2} (1,100/sq mi)
- Demonym: Poncaralesi
- Time zone: UTC+1 (CET)
  - Summer (DST): UTC+2 (CEST)
- Postal code: 25020
- Dialing code: 030
- Patron saint: Gervasius and Protasius
- Saint day: 19 June
- Website: Official website

Poncarale (Brescian: Poncaràl) is a comune in the province of Brescia, in Lombardy.

== History ==
=== Origin of the name ===
The name comes from the Latin pons caralis to point out the driveway bridge of the castle for communicate with the burgum.

=== Roman and medieval era ===
The oldest archeological findings are from the Roman era, which came to light in 1931 during the restoration work following the overflowing of the river Garza.

In the 9th century there was a noble Brescian family named Poncarali tasked with the administration of the surrounding plain.

=== From 15th to 19th century ===
The plague afflicted the town. The first church of the town was opened in 1717. In 1897 the cemetery and the town hall were built by the company of the mayor Emanuele Bertazzoli.

=== 20th century ===
From 1928 to 1956 the comune combined with the comune of Flero (it was founded the comune of Poncarale Flero) by a Royal Decree.

During the Second World War the Monte Netto was a shelter for many partisans.

== Geography ==
The territory of Poncarale is characterized by the presence of the relief of the Monte Netto, an isolated plain area. There are many rivers, like Molone and Vaso Orso. The most common crops are corn, sugar beet and soy, moreover is an important area for the vineyards.

== Notable people ==
- Aimo Diana, footballer
- Bruno Giacomelli, Formula 1 driver

== Gallery ==
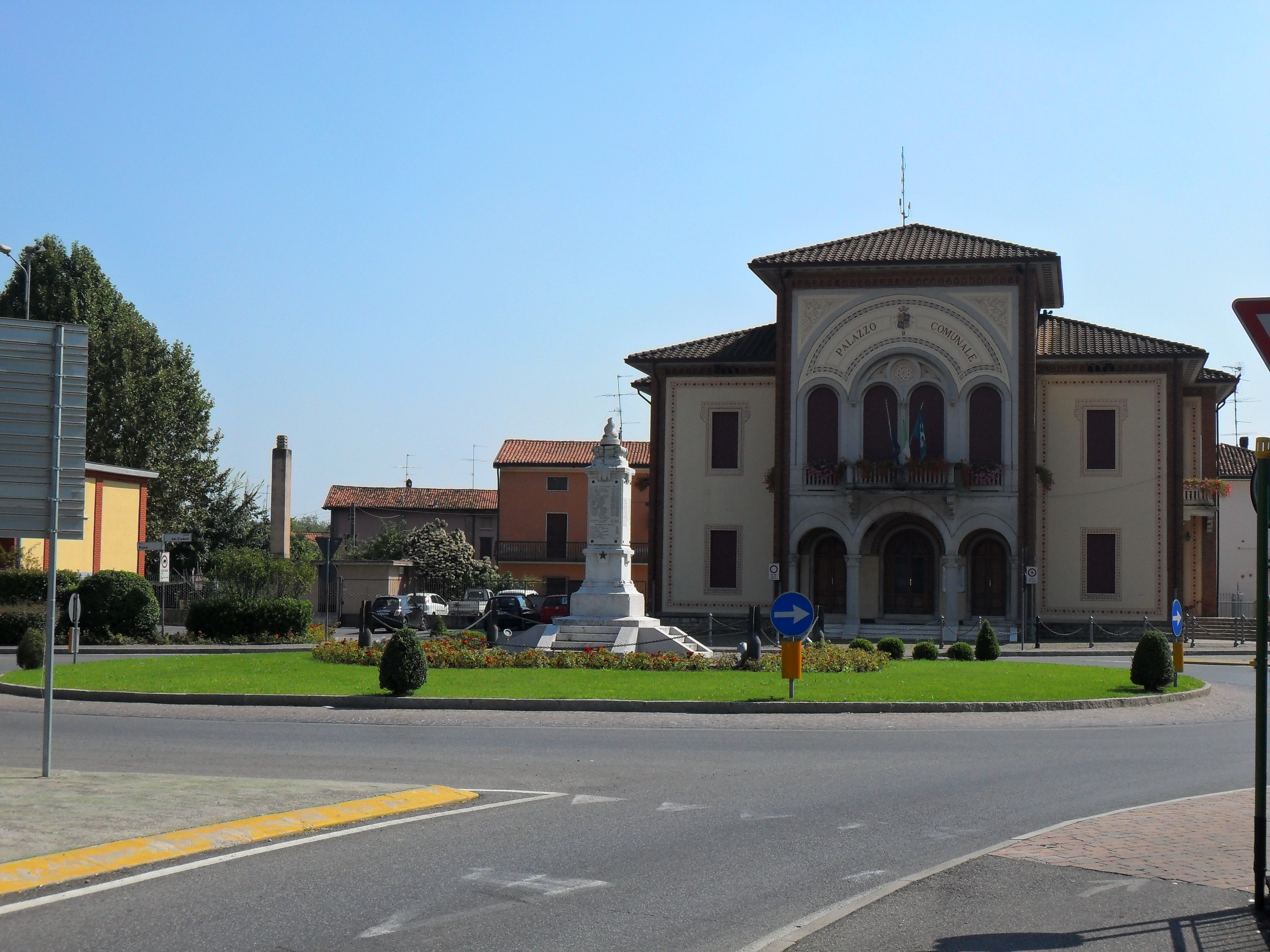
Piazza dei caduti in Poncarale

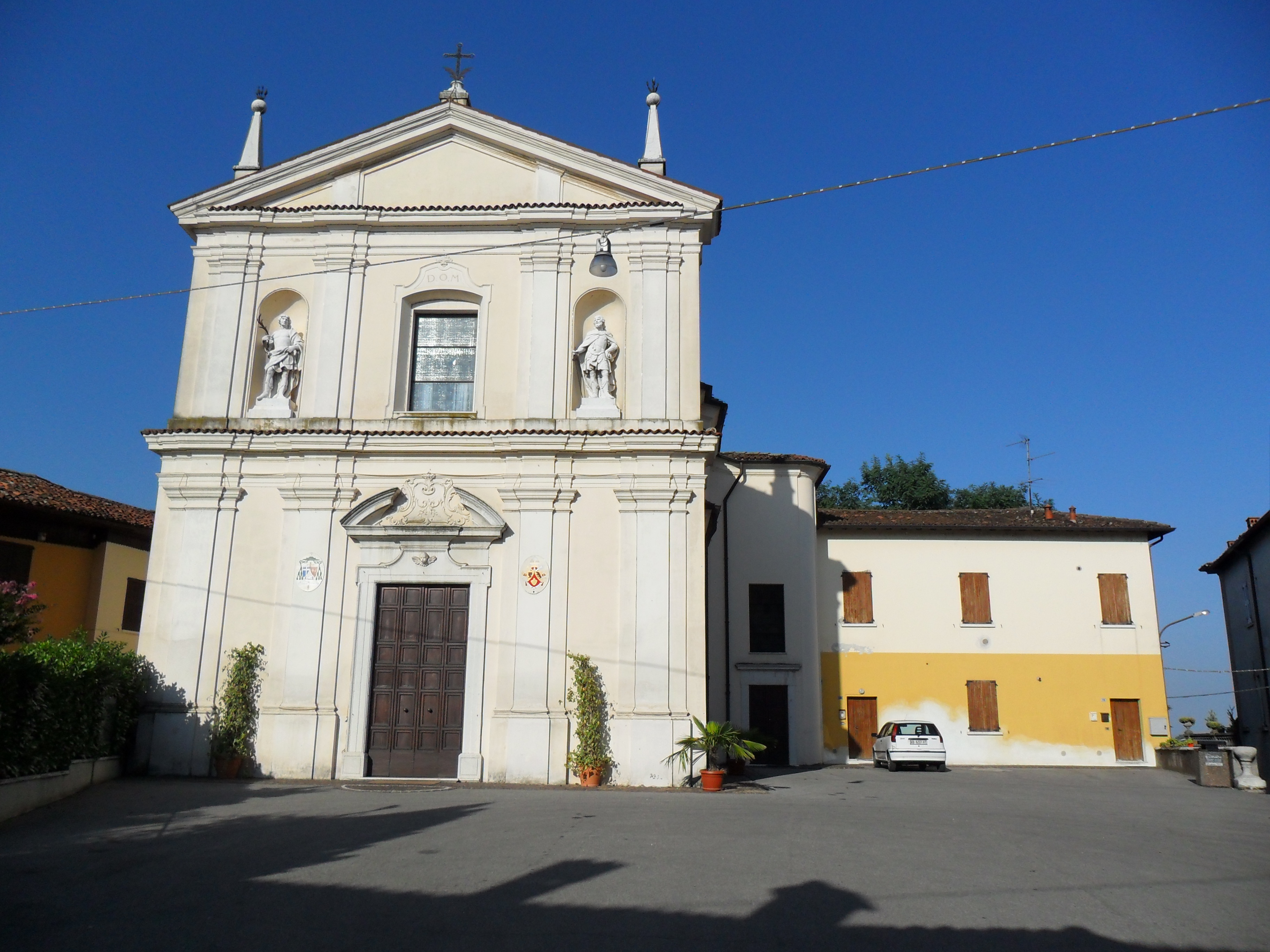
The church of Poncarale

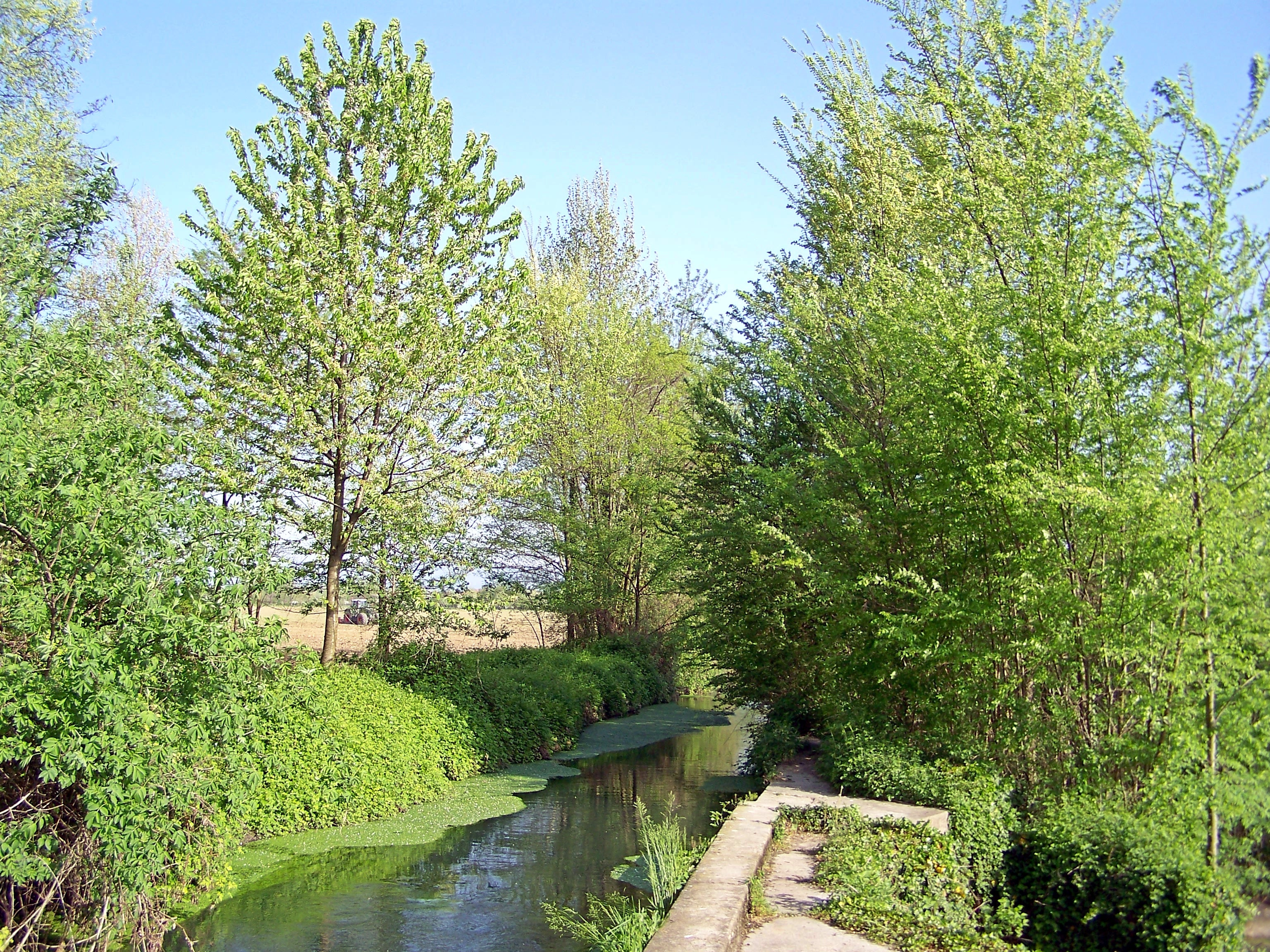
The Vaso Orso
