= Monte Tavagnone =

Mountain in Lombardy, Italy

- Tavagnù
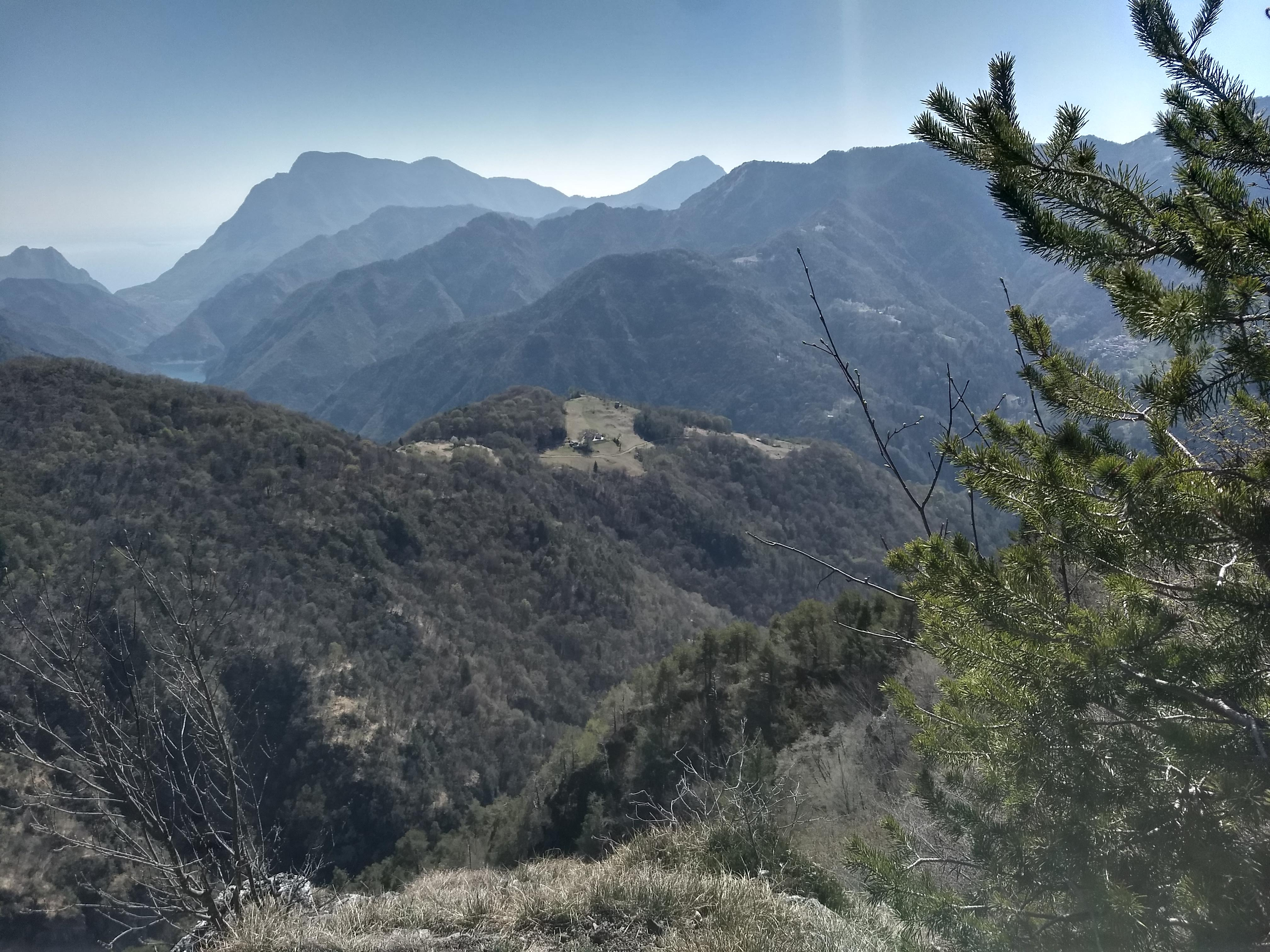
- Mount Tavagnone and the Dos di Sas as seen from Cima Camiolo peak

Highest point
- Elevation: 1,010 m (3,310 ft)
- Coordinates: 45°44′49″N 10°36′23″E

Geography
- Location within Lombardy
- Location: Lombardy, Brescia, Italy
- Parent range: Brescia and Garda Prealps

Mount Tavagnone (Tavagnù in the local dialect) is a mountain in the Brescia and Garda Prealps belonging to the Tombea-Manos group and with its Dos di Sas summit, it reaches 1,010 m.a.s.l.

== Physical geography ==
Located in the municipal territory of Valvestino, it is part of the Alto Garda Bresciano Regional Park. The place was until the 1970s, before the abandonment of mountain farming by the last farmers of Turano, Magasa and Bollone, an area of mountain pasture and fodder cultivation, dedicated to cheese production, and can be considered the most secluded of the Val Vestino. The mountain is characterized by vast wooded areas and some grasslands with rural funds used in the past for fodder cultivation and cattle breeding. In addition to the Dos di Sas there are in the vicinity three other higher elevations, but two are unnamed and not shown on any map, from south to north: the first is Mount Gàs, (Note: Gas, gaz, gazzo, gac or gaccio is a toponym of Lombard origin and derives from the word "gahagi" or "gahadium," the sacred, fenced forest reserved for the Arimanni, the warriors and freemen of the Lombard hierarchy. In the Middle Ages the term denoted a public forest or land, that is, belonging to the community, in this case of Turano, where the cutting and removal of wood, even dry wood, or the grazing of livestock without the necessary authorization was prohibited.) 1,128 m high, the second 1,143 m high, and the third 1,067 m high, which corresponds to the head of the Sas valley, and is known as Passo della Fobbiola.

At 980 m a.s.l., near Dos di Sas, on the watershed, is the Bocca della Véna pass, (Note: It is a very common toponym in Italy either as a hydronym, and it derived from the Latin word "vena" meaning conduit, artery, it is related to bodies of water, springs, fountains, streams, or as an oronym, being derived from dialectal parlance concerning the morphology of the terrain or relief that stands for a rock face or cliff. In this case, it indicates a passage in a rocky and precipitous place located towards the Val Cava.) which connects the Droanello valley with the Bollone mill and Fucina in the Toscolano stream valley by a path. Along the path connecting the mountain with the Apene locality of Mount Camiolo, near the head of the Sas Valley, is the well-known Fobbiola Pass. The origin of the place name seems to derive, for some, from the Latin word "fovea," meaning a pit or depression; for others, it is Lombard and indicates the narrow, mid-altitude alpine passes. A few kilometers to the southwest, near Mount Spino, in the municipality of Toscolano Maderno, there is another pass with a similar name located at 961 m a.s.l. while to the west is the Cavallino della Fobia in the municipality of Treviso Bresciano, to the north, in the municipality of Tremosine, the Malga Fobia is found instead, and to the east, in the municipality of Tignale, the Passo di Fobia at 907 m a.s.l.

In the whole mountainous area there is the presence of only two aquifers with a limited flow rate at the springs called Fontane or Acqua della Véna and Acqua del Pì, so in the past each cottage was used for food or livestock watering from cisterns or, mostly, rainwater ponds. In 2011, ERSAF Lombardy, with the project to safeguard these ancient ponds and the biodiversity of species in the Alto Garda Bresciano Regional Park, restored the one located in the Corsetti agricultural estate known as Prandini. Supporting the past agricultural economy are the ruins of kilns devoted to the production of lime, roofing tiles and numerous charcoal piles, locally called "giài," where charcoal traded on the Lake Garda was produced mainly to feed the furnaces of the Toscolano Maderno paper mills and the metallurgical industry.

=== The geology of Dos di Sas ===
The section of the ancient trail that runs from Nangù Bridge along the side of the mountain is very steep, and the rock that forms the "skeleton" of the mountain, uncovered by soil and vegetation, surfaces here and there, pockmarked by the passage of the mule track. The rock shows a grayish coloration, as if dirty, as its surface is altered by frost, rain and sun and often "stained" by colonies of tiny lichens. Underneath this "crust" it shows a lighter hue, which confirms its belonging to the calcareous rocks, that is, composed mainly of the salt "calcium carbonate". More precisely. these rocks belong to the group of so-called "gray limestones" and have the age of about 190 million years. They were formed on the fjord of a very ancient sea as a result of the gradual deposition of mineral particles carried into the sea by watercourses. This process lasted millions of years and underwent frequent interruptions and variations, which today are evidenced by the layered structure of the rock, that is, the presence of overlapping layers. After the petrification of the sediment deposit, the rock was pushed upward by the immense forces that created the Alps (including Dos di Sas), so the layers have partly lost their original horizontal arrangement.

== Origin of the name ==
The origin of the word is completely unknown and could derive from an anthroponym, that is, from the name or nickname or an augmentative of the ancient owner of the mountain. To corroborate this hypothesis in the municipality of Magasa, at Cima Rest, there is a site with the same toponym, in fact, it seems that this draws its origin from a certain Gottardo Gottardi, known as Tavagnone or Tavagnù who in 1633 arranged in his will that, at his death, the proceeds from the rent of his two barns at Cima Rest and at Monte Denai should be spent in plenty of salt to be distributed to the population of Magasa.

The name of Mount Tavagnone first appears in a parchment dated October 31, 1511 when representatives of the Vestino Valley communities proceeded to the land partition, under the auspices of Count Bartolomeo Lodron, of Mount Camiolo and other mountainous areas, including Mount Tavagnone, which was assigned to the community of Turano.

In the "Atlas Tyrolensis" by cartographer Peter Anich, printed in Vienna in 1774, which is the first detailed map of the County of Tyrol, it is referred to as Tavagnon. The summit of the mountain is called Dos di Sas, rock or stone hump, translated from the local dialect, and in fact it looks like a hump, with a sharp boulder on the summit and rocky on the slope located to the south.

== History ==
In the past centuries especially between 1426 and 1796, given its strategic position on the edge of the state border between the Republic of Venice and the Prince-Bishopric of Trent, the area of Mount Camiolo and Mount Tavagnone aroused in the Venetian superintendents of Salò a nagging concern about any possible enemy movement that through the passes or paths from the Vestino Valley could threaten the Salò Riviera. Thus the name of the mountain is mentioned in the report that superintendent Melchior Zane, dated June 3, 1621, secretly sent to the Council of Pregadi where he stated: "[...] The second pass that enters the municipality of Gargnano is that of Cocca di Pavolon with two roads. One comes from Cadria, a place of the Vestino Valley, passing through the mountain of Risech of the commune of Tignale, with horses and pedestrians, and the other from Camiolo, a place of the said Valley, goes up the mountain of Pinedo of the commune of Gargnano and goes into the river of Droane, coming even from the Cocca di Pavolon." The mount, between the late 1500s and the first decades of the 1600s, lent itself as a place of refuge and transit for bandits linked to the gang of Giovanni Beatrice known as Zanzanù and Eliseo Baruffaldi of Turano, who frequented a den at Martelletto di Droane, now called Cùel Zanzanù, and enjoyed favor among the peasants of Mount Camiolo, and in fact the path of the Martelletto and the Fobbiola Pass allowed a fast and elusive connection between the Droanello valley floor and the mountain funds, thus escaping possible control by local militias.

The geographic location of Mount Pinedo has raised some doubts in the past, in fact the Mount has been reported only in the "Atlas Tyrolensis" map of 1774 by Peter Anich south of the mouth of the Droanello valley and the stream itself, and in essence it would consist of the vast wooded slope, enclosed between Mount Prà-Lignago and Bocchetta della Cocca, which slopes into the Droanello stream belonging to the hamlet of Costa in the municipality of Gargnano. On the contrary, according to Mario Trebeschi's well-known research of the 1511 parchment, Mount Pinedo would instead correspond to Mount Tavagnone or its wooded appurtenances; in fact, in support of this thesis, Superintendent Zane's report mentions verbatim that the mule road from Mount Camiolo rises to Mount Pinedo and then descends into the Droanello stream and not as claimed by cartographer Peter Anich, who reports it south of the stream itself.

The toponym Pinedo finds its origin from the Latin "pinetum," meaning pine forest, and can be found in Spain, in Valencia, in Veneto with the locality of the same name in Ampezzo in Cadore, in Claut in Friuli, or in Trentino with Pinè, called in 1253 Pinedo, and would thus indicate a forest, normally of Scotch pine, where plant resination and extraction of black pitch was practiced.

It has been repeatedly affected by forest fires on its southeastern slope, which have impaired its wild pine forestation, most recently on June 28 and 29, 2021 on the Dos di Sas slope.

=== 1511: the great division of pastures and forests of the Camiolo, Tombea, Dos di Sas mountains and the coast of Ve ===
The study carried out by Don Mario Trebeschi, former parish priest of Limone del Garda, of a crumpled and in places illegible parchment preserved in the Parish Archive of Magasa, brought to light the intensive exploitation of alpine pastures, forests, and torrential waters in the Vestino Valley that was often the cause of interminable and bitter quarrels among the six communities. Especially in the disputed areas of the Tombea and Camiolo mountains; each of them claimed, more or less strongly, ancient rights of possession or transit, with the result that normal and proper use was compromised by constant trespassing by herds and illegal logging. Thus in the early sixteenth century, in order to avoid worse trouble, it came in two successive stages with the authoritative arbitration of the Lodron counts to a partition of these places among the various villas or "communelli." In fact, these played an active role in the affair, energetically persuading the communities to the final resolution of the problem by signing an agreement that was as balanced as possible, so much so as to completely and definitively satisfy the exacting demands of the many parties involved. On July 5, 1502, the notary Delaido Cadenelli of Valle di Scalve drew up in Turano under the kitchen porch of the house of a certain Giovanni, a settlement deed between Armo and Magasa for the consensual exploitation of the neighboring Cablone valley (in the document Camlone, located below Mount Cortina). Present were the deputies for Armo: Bartolomeo, son of Faustino, and Stefenello, son of Lorenzo; for Magasa: Antoniolo, son of Giovanni Zeni, and Viano, son of Giovanni Bertolina. Serving as appellate judges were Counts Francesco, Bernardino, and Paride, sons of the aforementioned Giorgio, who went down in the history of local chronicles of the time as men endowed with bloody ferocity. On October 31, 1511, in the rectory of the church of St. John the Baptist in Turano, Bartolomeo, son of the late Stefanino Bertanini of Villavetro, a public notary by imperial authority, stipulated the document of the largest land division ever in the Valley, more than a third of its territory was affected. An initial agreement had already been stipulated on September 5, 1509 by the notary Girolamo Morani on records of the notary Giovan Pietro Samuelli of Liano, but following the intervention of some variations it was preferred, at the invitation of Counts Bernardino and Paride, to completely revise everything and thus proceed to a new partition. In the presence of Count Bartolomeo, son of the late Bernardino, the parish priest Bernardino, son of the late Tommaso Bertolini, Francesco, son of Bernardino Piccini, both from Gargnano, the Bergamasque Bettino, son of the late Luca de Medici from San Pellegrino, were gathered as witnesses, three proxies for each municipality, with the exception of Bollone, which was not part of the dispute (for Magasa attended by Zeno son of the late Giovanni Zeni, Pietro Andrei, and Viano Bertolini), and the division of the property due to each individual village was solemnly carried out. Magasa was given the ownership of Mount Tombea up to the meadows of Fondo including the area pertaining to the Malga Alvezza and the exclusive right to all transit rights; a part of wooded territory on the Cima Gusaur and on the Apene hump in Camiolo, in compensation it paid 400 lire to the other communities as recompense for the damages suffered for the deprivation of the aforementioned mountain passages. Some clauses expressly stipulated that the Nangone bridge (Vangone or Nangù in the local dialect) was to be in common use and that along the Toscolano stream bed cattle could be freely grazed and its water used to feed the hydraulic mechanisms of the factories. On the contrary, grazing and illegal cutting of plants was severely punished with a fine of 10 soldi for each offense committed. In the end, after rereading the specifications, all the contractors declared that they had full knowledge of the parts of property they had in their possession, that they acknowledged that the division implemented was impartial, and that they respectfully observed the statutes, orders, provisions and decrees of Count Lodron, lords of the Lodrone community and those of Val Vestino. Then the representatives of Armo, Magasa, Moerna, Persone and Turano swore, before Count Bartholomew Lodron, touching the holy gospels, not to counterfeit and contravene the present land division and, by their act, submitted themselves to the judgment of the ecclesiastical forum and the sacred canons of Chalcedon.

== Nature ==
The area of the mountain, given its scientific importance, was herborized starting in the mid-19th century by Pietro Porta and investigated in 2006 by German biologist Sönke Hardersen, who in the course of his entomological research noticed on the mountain a specimen of the lepidopteran Cacyreus marshalli, an alien species native to South Africa, first reported in Italy, in Rome, in 1996 and in Europe, in Mallorca, in 1990.

No less impressive are its natural resources consisting of forests and meadows covering the southern slope and ungulate wildlife. The vast forests of deciduous plants were exploited for the production of charcoal, while the resinous ones in past centuries had great importance in the economy of Val Vestino. Scotch pine and fir trees were exploited in the period between spring and late summer, for the extraction, from the stumps, of black pitch and turpentine, a plant resin, from the stems, which solidified is called white pitch. Refined locally at the furnaces in the Fornello locality, it was traded profitably with the Republic of Venice as Greek pitch, employing it for various uses, especially in naval arsenals for caulking the ship and on its fixed and running rigging, taking advantage of its watertightness.

=== The practice of charcoal-burning ===
There are numerous ancient charcoal kilns on the mountain, symbolic of a profession that disappeared decades ago. The charcoal pile, pojat in the local dialect, was a technique widely used in the past in much of the Alpine, subalpine and Apennine territory to transform wood, preferably beech, but also fir, hornbeam, larch, ash, chestnut, turkey oak, pine and mountain pine, into charcoal. Valvestines were considered expert charcoal burners, carbonèr as they were called, as also reflected in the writings of Cesare Battisti. The earliest records of this profession date back to the 17th century, when men from Val Vestino applied to the authorities of the Serenissima for health permits to travel to Florence and Venice. They practiced their work not only in Italy but also in the territories of the former Austro-Hungarian Empire, especially in Bosnia-Herzegovina, and in the late 19th-century United States of America in Syracuse-Solvay.

Although this technique has undergone minor changes over the centuries, the charcoal kiln has always maintained a conical mound shape, formed by a central chimney and other side vent shafts, used for the purpose of regulating air draft. The charcoal production process takes advantage of imperfect wood combustion, which occurs under conditions of low oxygenation for 13 or 14 days.

These small barnyards, locally called ajal, jal or gial, were scattered in the woods at fairly regular distances and connected by dense networks of paths. They had to be located far from draughts and consisted of sandy, permeable soil. Very often, given the steep terrain of the woods, they were supported by dry stone walls, and nearby the charcoal burner would build a wooden hut to shelter himself and his family. Small pieces of charred wood can still be found in these pitches today. They were carefully cleaned during the preparation of the wood.

When the firing was completed, the decarbonization stage would begin, which required 1–2 days of work. First the coal had to be cooled with numerous shovelfuls of earth. It was then extracted by extinguishing any embers left burning with water. The quality of the coal obtained varied depending on the skill and experience of the charcoal burner, but also on the wood used. The best quality coal had to "sing well," that is, make a good noise. Finally the coal, when it was well cooled, was bagged and transported by the muleteers to the Garda Riviera to be sold to buyers. Both domestic and industrial use was made of this coal, and the practice fell into disuse in the Valley shortly after World War II supplanted by the use of electricity, diesel fuel and its derivatives.

=== The watering hole of the "Prandini" fund ===
The puddle present in the former Corsetti fund, known as the "lavàc del Prandini," now acquired by ERSAF-Lombardia, plays a fundamental role in maintaining the grazing activity of the area linked to the presence of wild animals on the mountain, but also in protecting the biodiversity of the habitats and species, reptiles and amphibians in particular, which through these pools of water can find an ideal place for their reproduction such as the grass snake (Natrix helvetica) or the tadpoles of the common frog and common toad. Local tradition reports that, given the lack of springs and watercourses in the area, the puddle had existed for centuries and the technique for creating it consisted of manual excavation in the watershed area of the mountain slope to facilitate subsequent filling with the natural collection of rainwater, percolation or snowmelt and, in this case, resurgent water from the Pì, the ridge above. The main problem encountered by the farmers consisted in the waterproofing of the bottom: often the simple trampling of the livestock, with consequent compaction of the soil, was not sufficient to guarantee the water tightness due to the low clay content of the ground, so it was necessary to distribute on the bottom a layer of good clay soil found in the immediate vicinity. Often not being possible due to the diversity of the soil, a thick layer of soil and beech foliage was compacted on the bottom, which could form an effective felt to retain water. To ensure a sufficient supply of water needed to fill the puddle, or to increase it, it was often necessary to make small surface channels, dug along the adjacent slope to intercept even a modest amount. Periodic maintenance, usually annually prior to mounding, consisted mainly of the removal of soil that had slipped inside due to the continuous trampling of watering livestock and the soiling of wildlife. Clearing of aquatic vegetation was also done to maintain the functionality of the puddle by preventing it from overgrowing inside by accelerating its natural silting process. Particular care was taken during these phases as there was a risk of breaking the continuity of the impermeable layer and compromising its functionality; for example, it was preferred not to remove any boulders on the bottom. The puddle was renovated by ERSAF Lombardy in 2004-2007 with the "Life nature project biocoenosis rehabilitation in Valvestino and Corno della Marogna."

== Access ==
The mount can only be reached on foot by walking 8 km., on a path, from Magasa via the trail that runs from Bocca alla Croce passing through Dos de le Mee or Mede (Note: The place name derives from the Latin word "meta," which transformed into the Lombard dialect "mea" or "meda" meaning heap or high ground and indicated in agricultural work precisely the heap, that is, sheaves of hay put in place after mowing also a mountainous relief. Dosso delle Mede is first mentioned in a parchment dated 1511.) or the other one that starts at the Apene fund of Mount Camiolo passing through Passo della Fobbiola, about 2 km. long. As an alternative, which is also the most convenient, from Valvestino, on a forest dirt road starting at the Bollone Mill in 4 km. or going up along the mule track that begins at the Fucina locality, which, in ancient times, were both connections designed with the mountain by the charcoal burners and farmers of Bollone or Turano who owned the five agricultural funds there.

== Image gallery ==
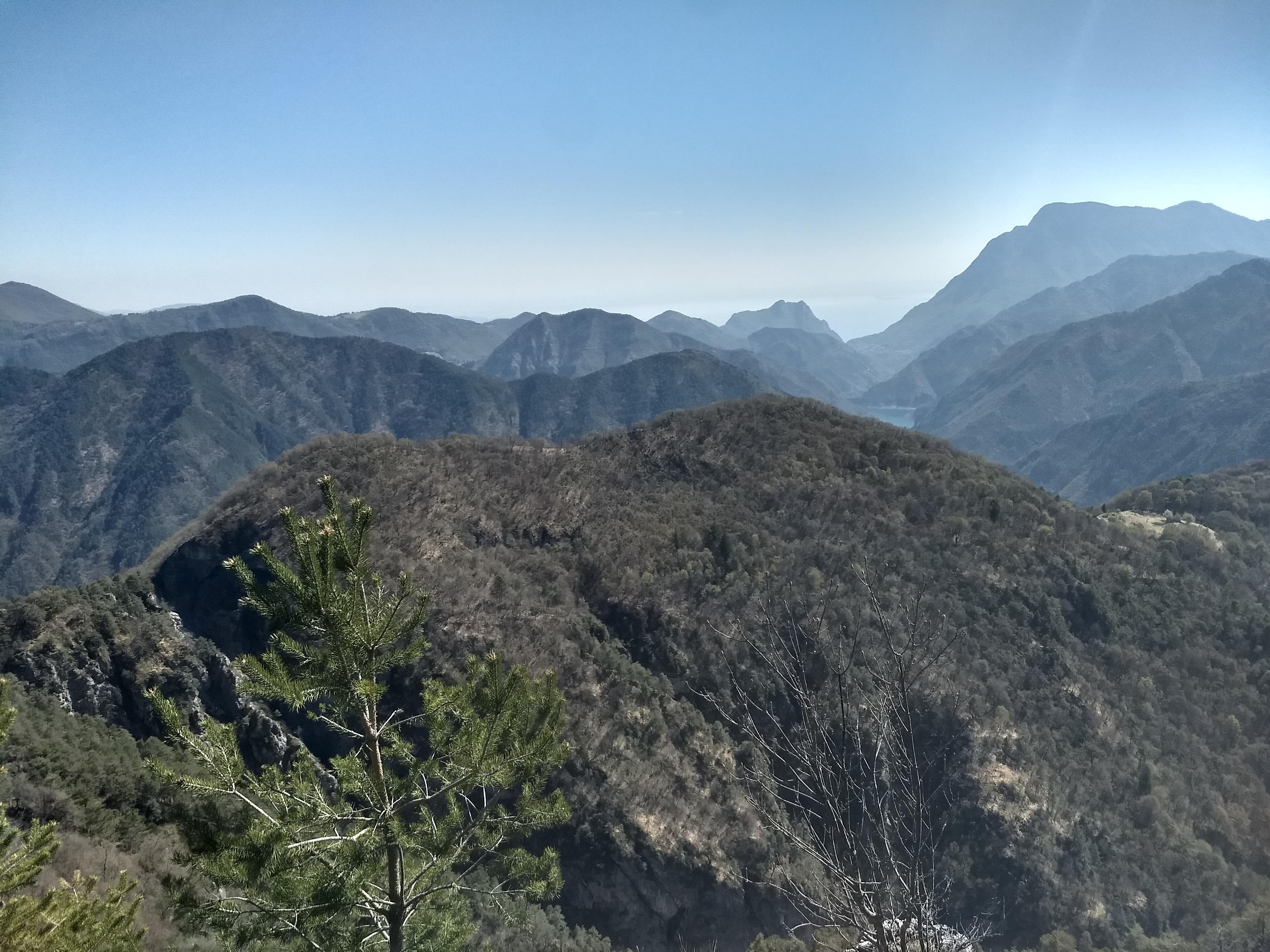
Mt. Tavagnone and its pastures of the former Battista Corsetti "Prandini" Fund, Dos di Sas and the Vein Pass on the far right, and ascending the ridge on the left three mountains, Mt. Gas respectively of 1,128 m., and two other unknown ones of 1,143 m., 1,067 m., while in the background the artificial lake of Valvestino, Mt. Pizzocolo, Mt. Castello and Lake Garda with the Sirmione peninsula.

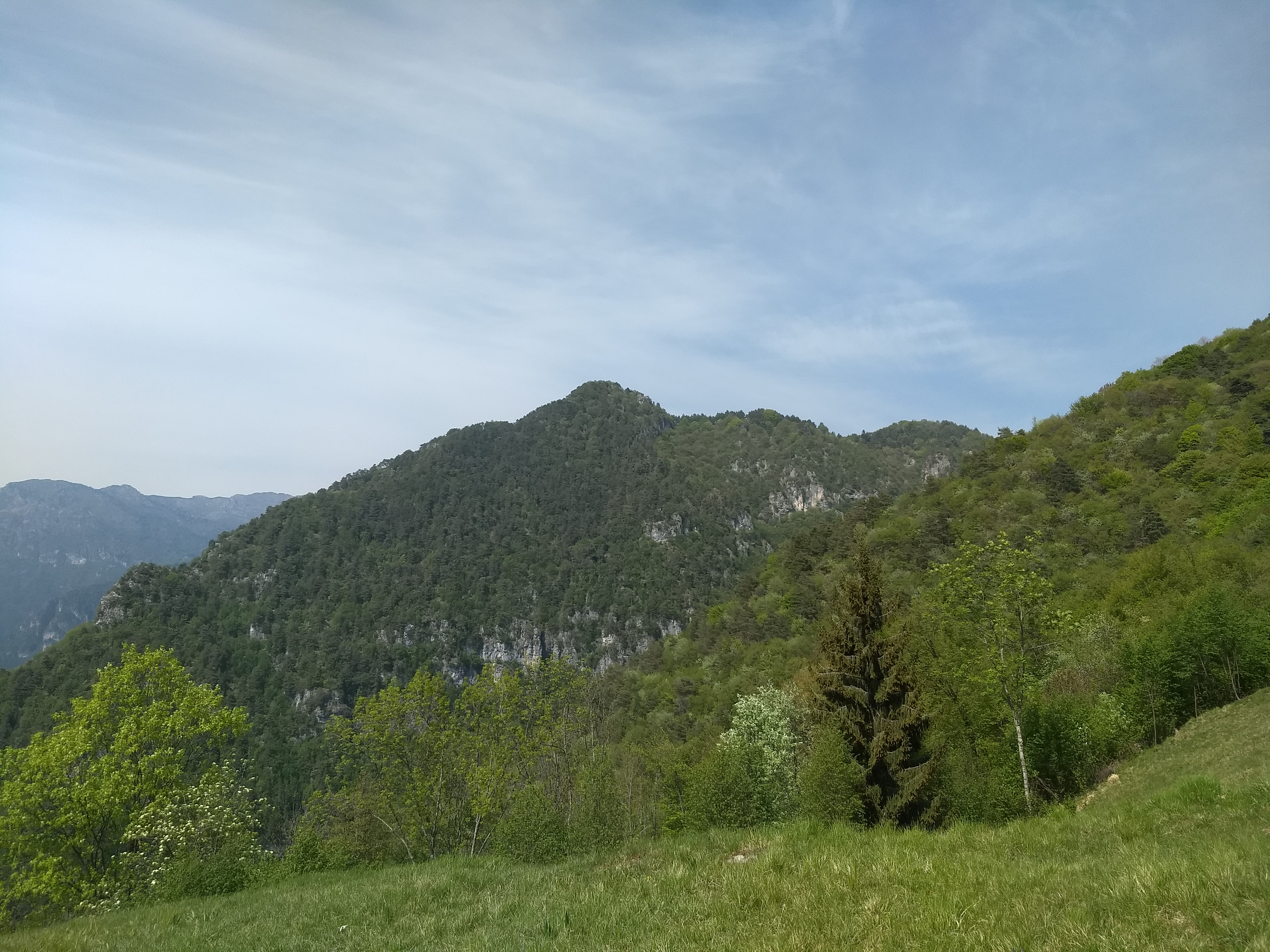
Mount Tavagnone, from the left Cima Camiolo or Pesòc, the Dosso Tondo or di Mezzo and on the right Mount Pine

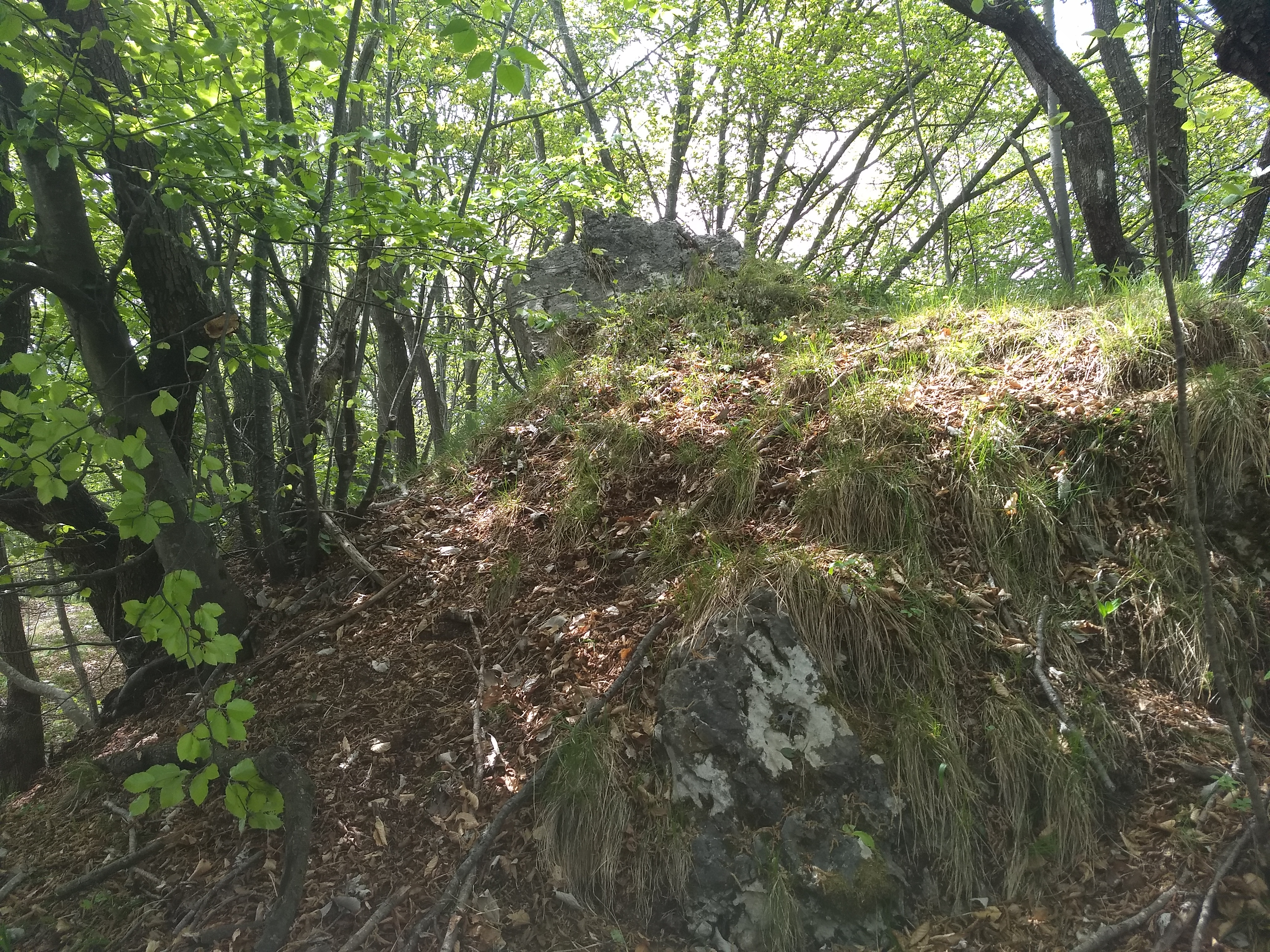
Mount Tavagnone, the pointed peak of the 1,010-meter-high Dos di Sas.

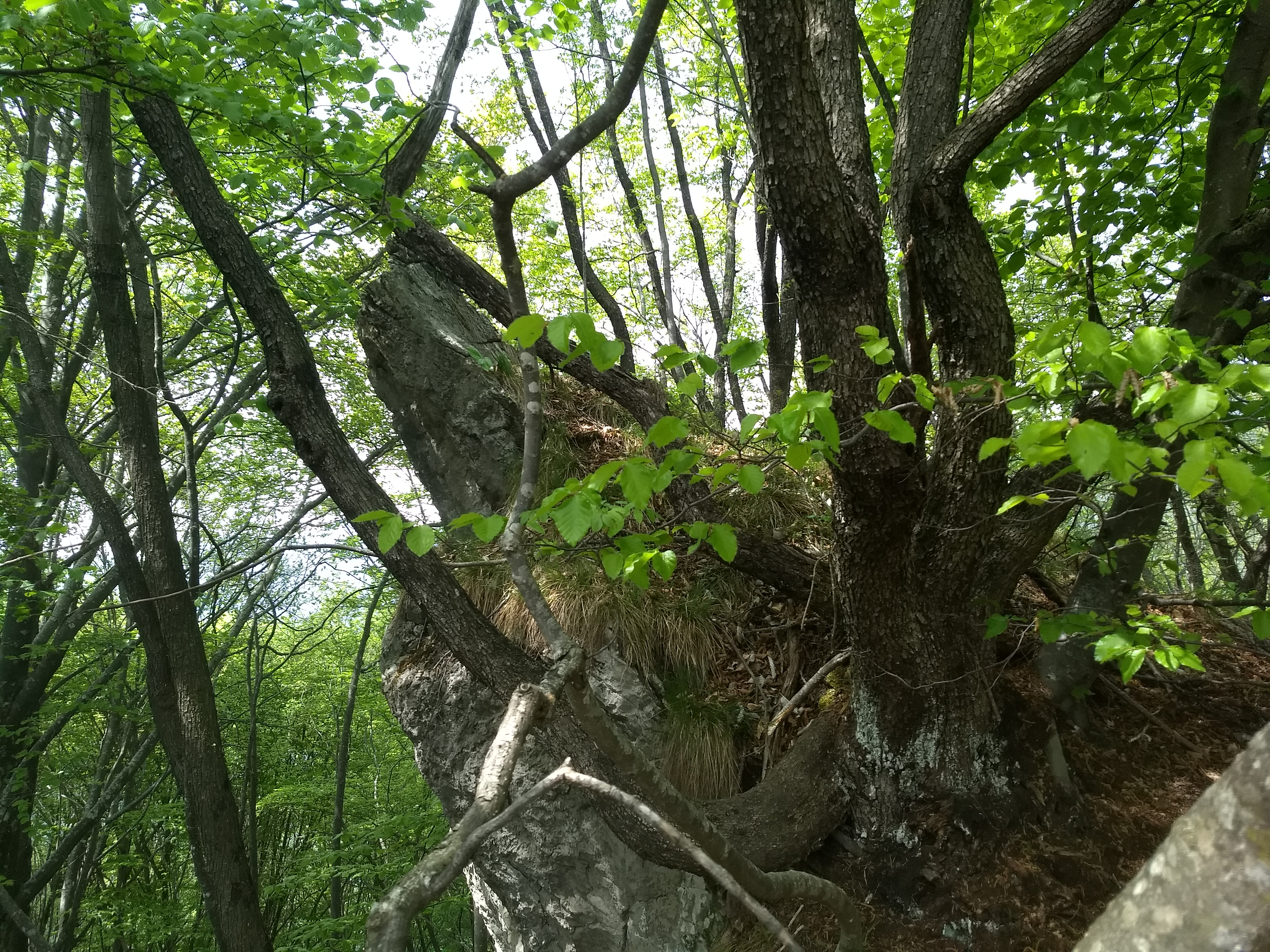
Mount Tavagnone, detail of the summit of Dos di Sas

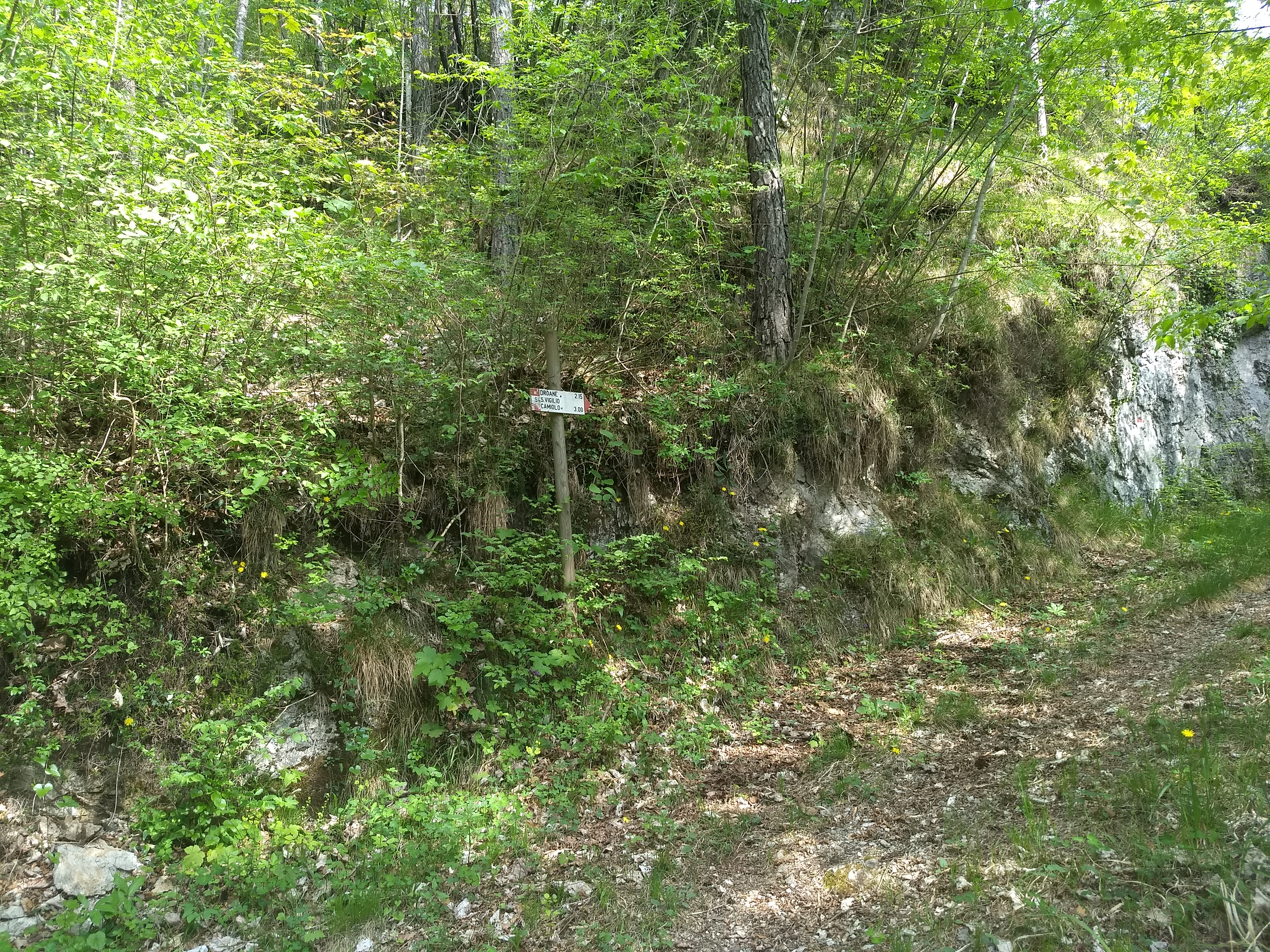
Mount Tavagnone, junction of the trail that leads to the Martelleto of Droane going up from the Bollone Mill

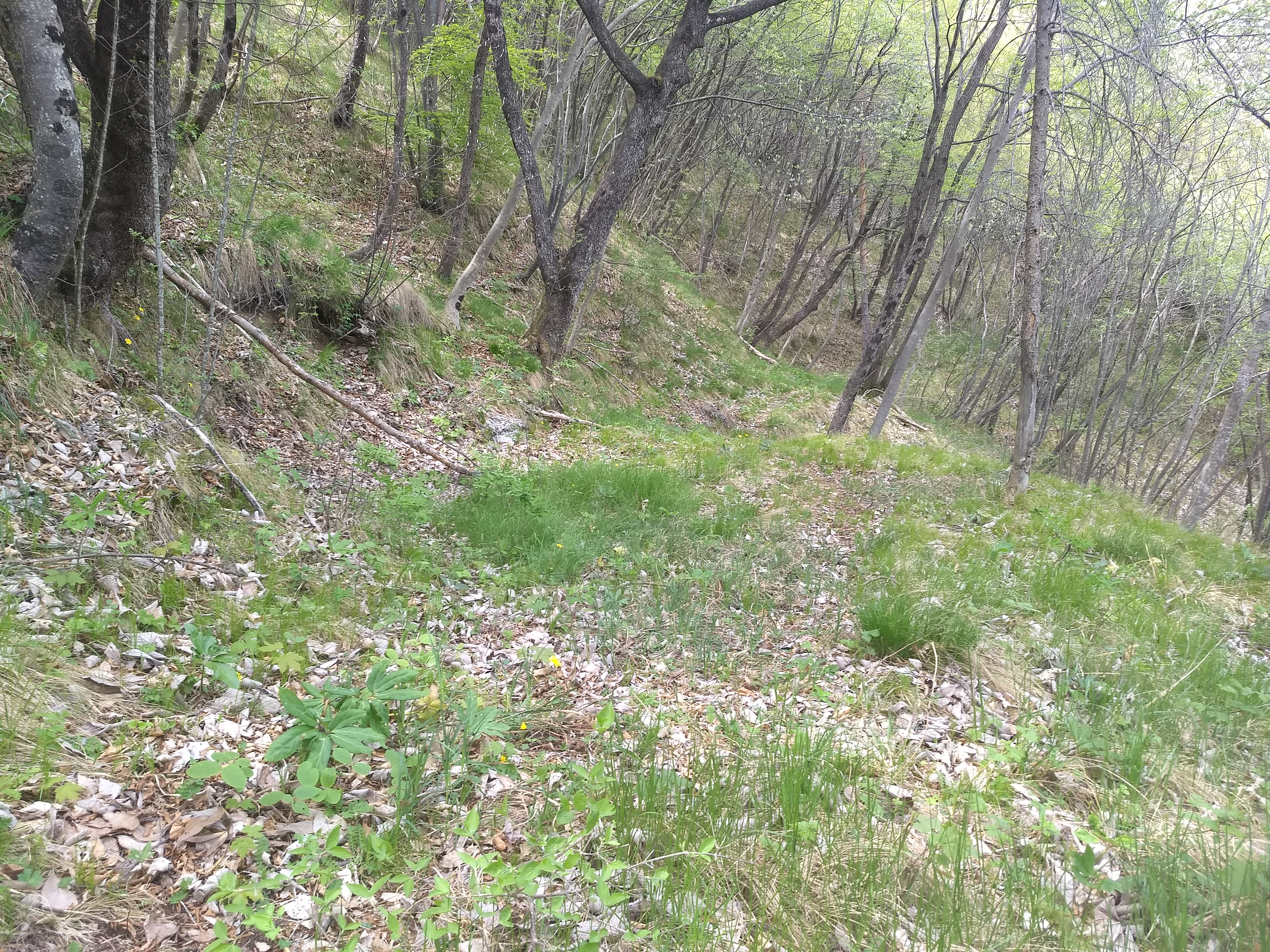
Mount Tavagnone, barnyard of a charcoal pile located on the trail from Bocca alla Croce to Tavagnone

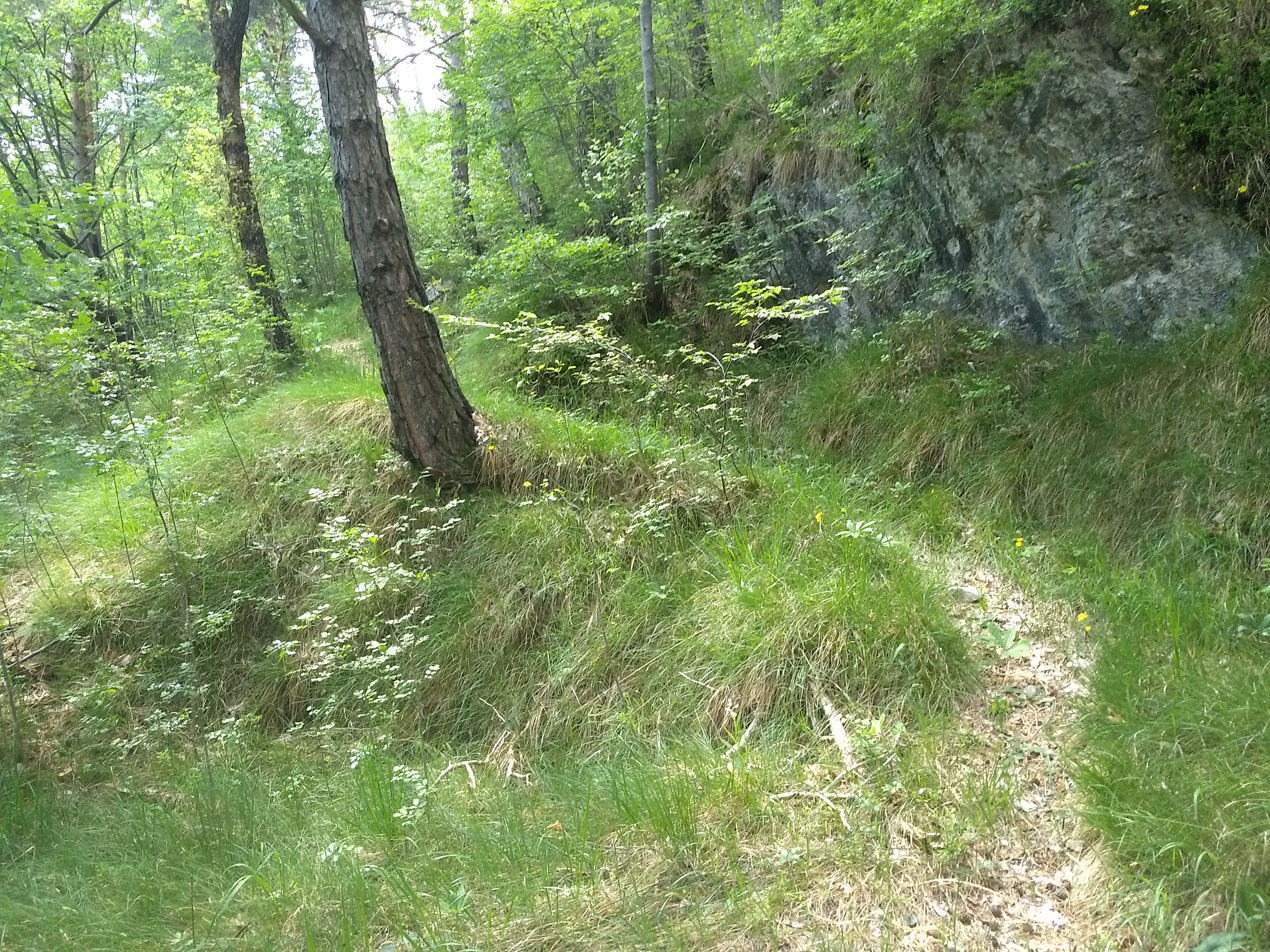
Mount Tavagnone, remnants of a charcoal pile yard on the Droanello trail

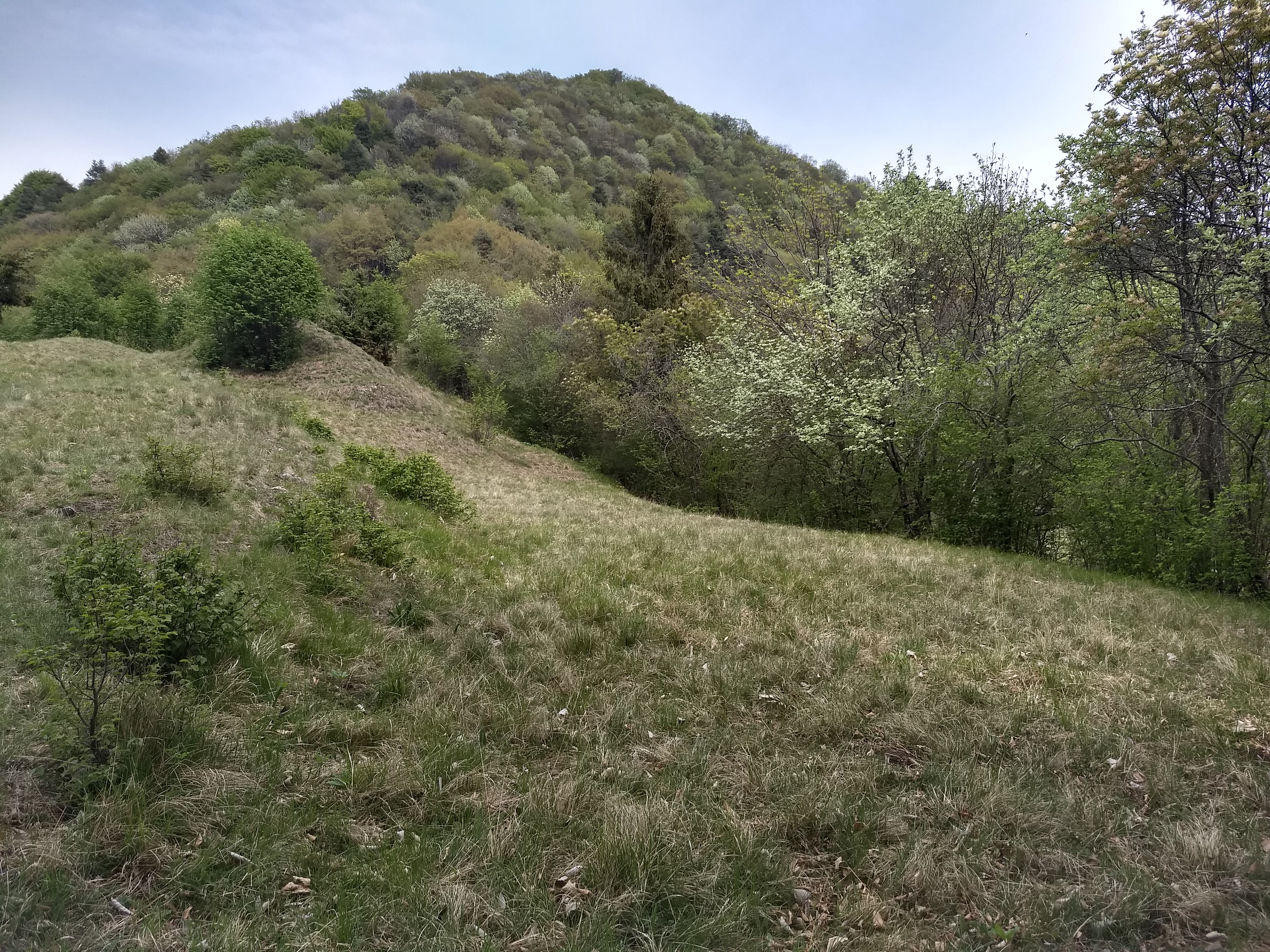
Mount Tavagnone, Mount Gàs 1,128 m. high above sea level, and on the way up, at the end of the meadow is the spring known as "Acqua del Pì"

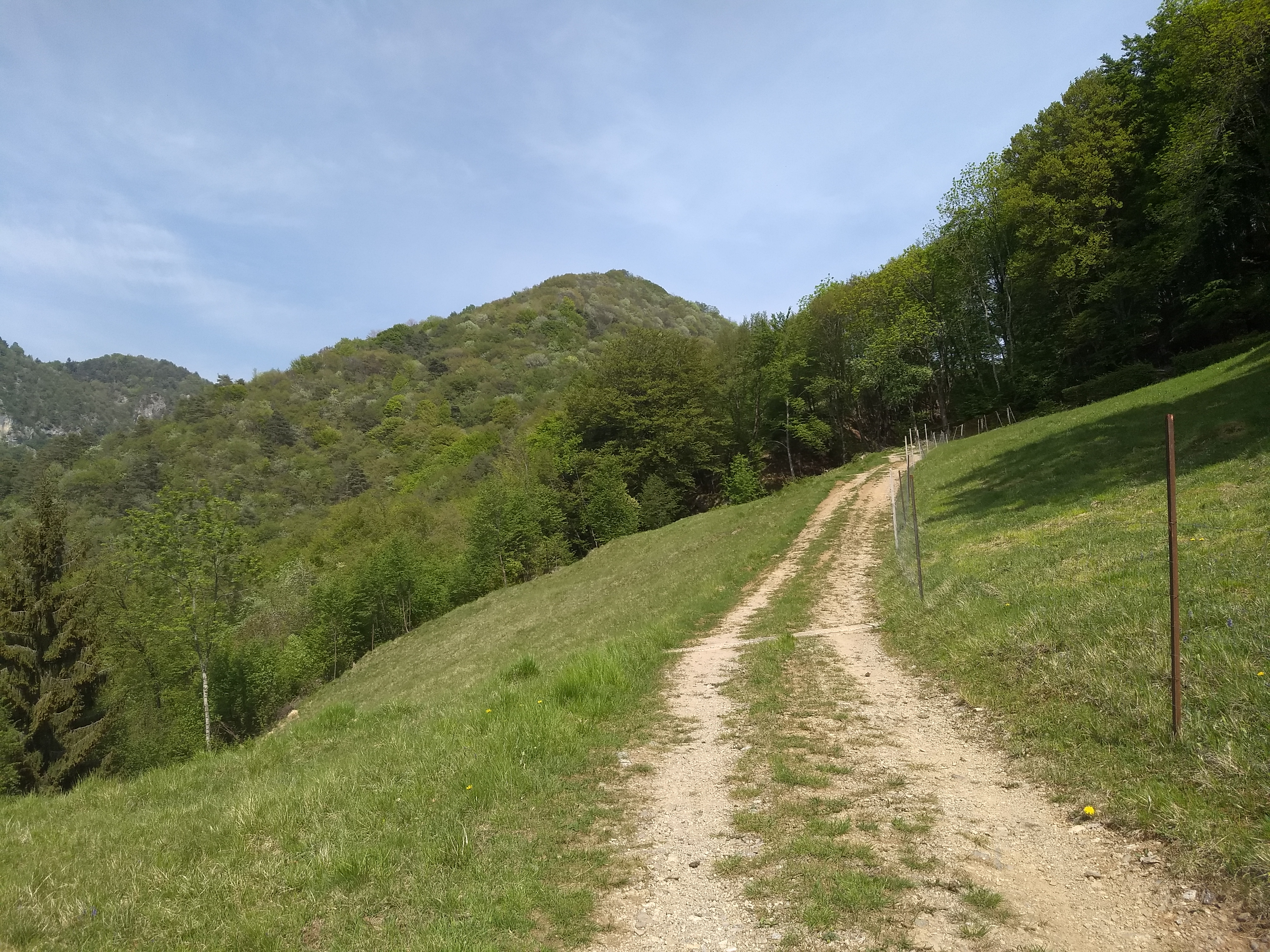
Mount Tavagnone, Mt. Gàs, 1,128 m. above sea level.

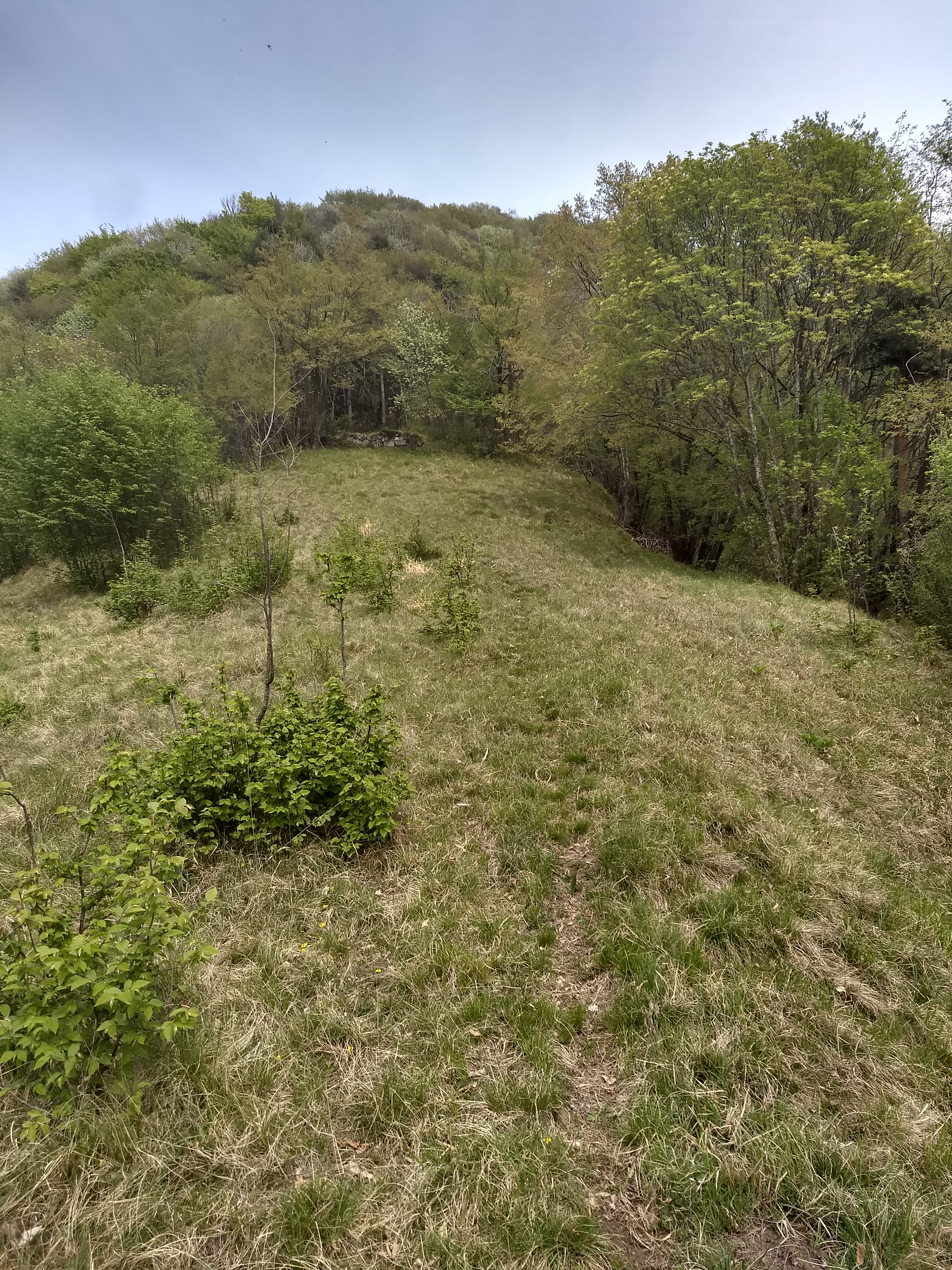
Mt. Tavagnone, slopes of Mt. Gàs, Orto locality with the spring near the dry stone wall called "Acqua del Pì" that also waters the underlying watering hole of the Battista Corsetti fund known as "Prandini"

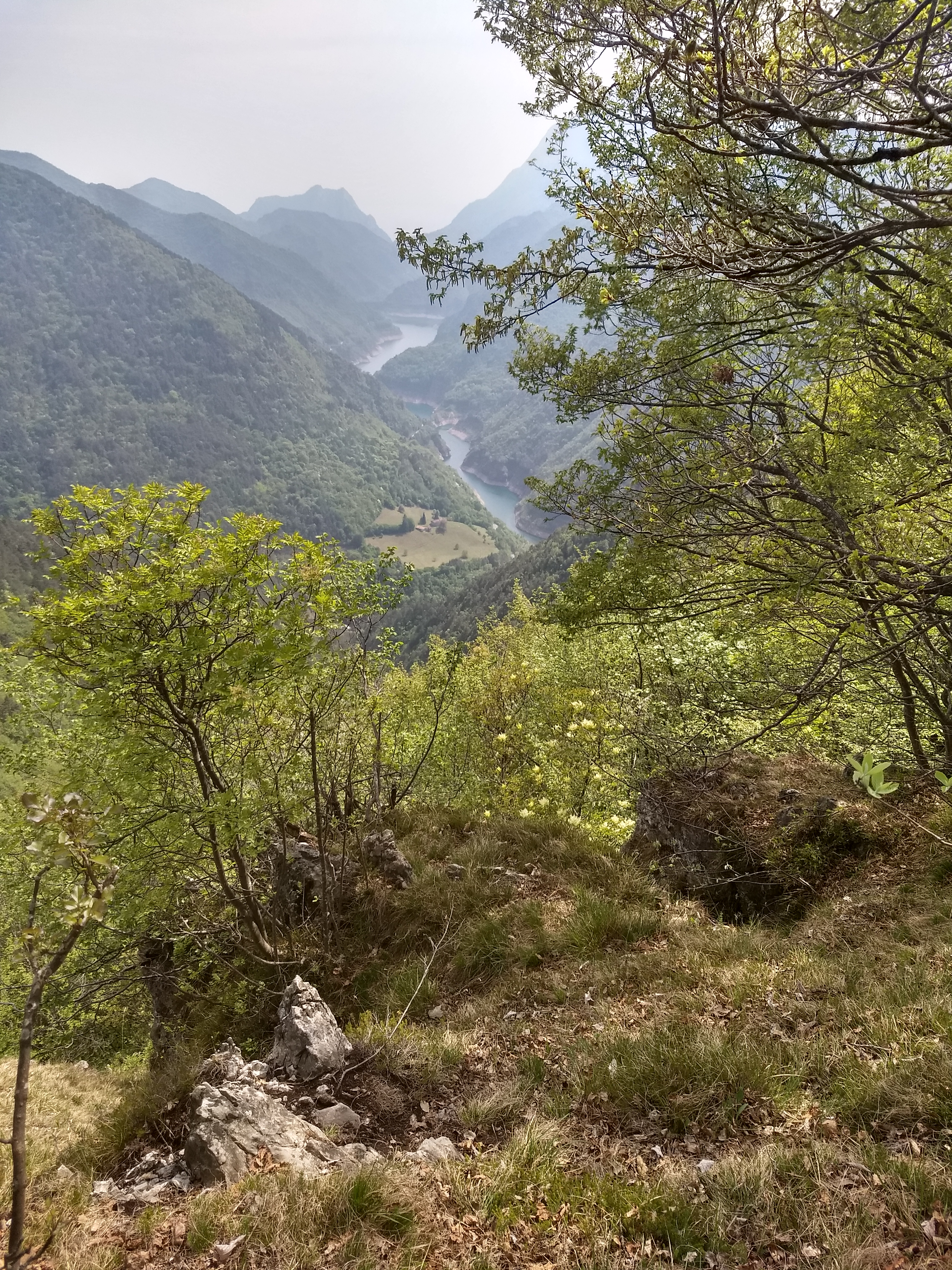
Mount Tavagnone, view of the fund of Lignago on the slopes of Mount Prà, the Valvestino Dam and in the background Mount Castello. To the left of Lignago the mountainside named in 1744 by cartographer Peter Anich mount Pinedo

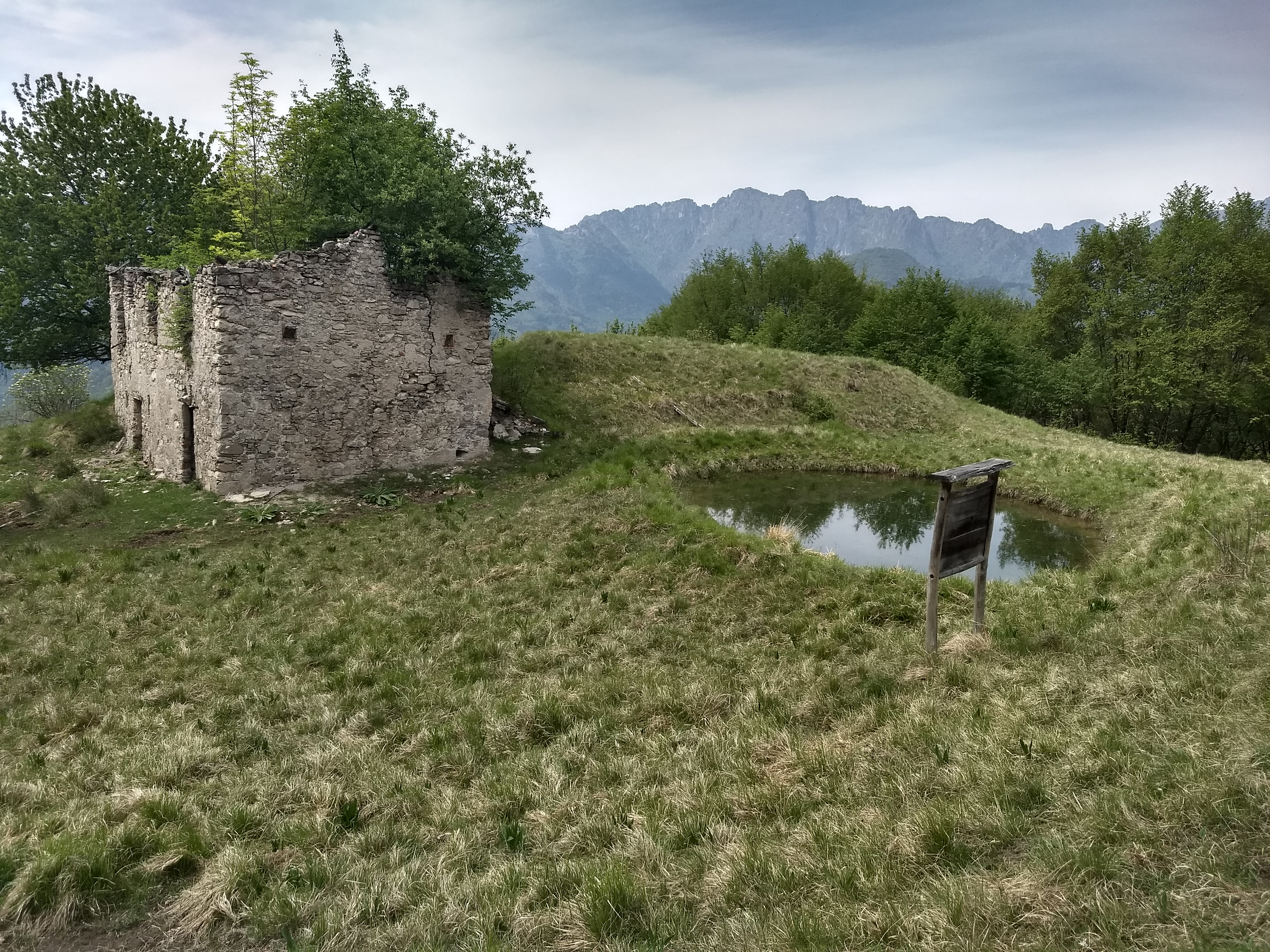
Mount Tavagnone, ruins of the former farmstead formerly owned by Battista Corsetti of Turano, known as "Prandini," with the watering hole built "ex novo" in 2011 by the ERSAF Lombardy, its current owner

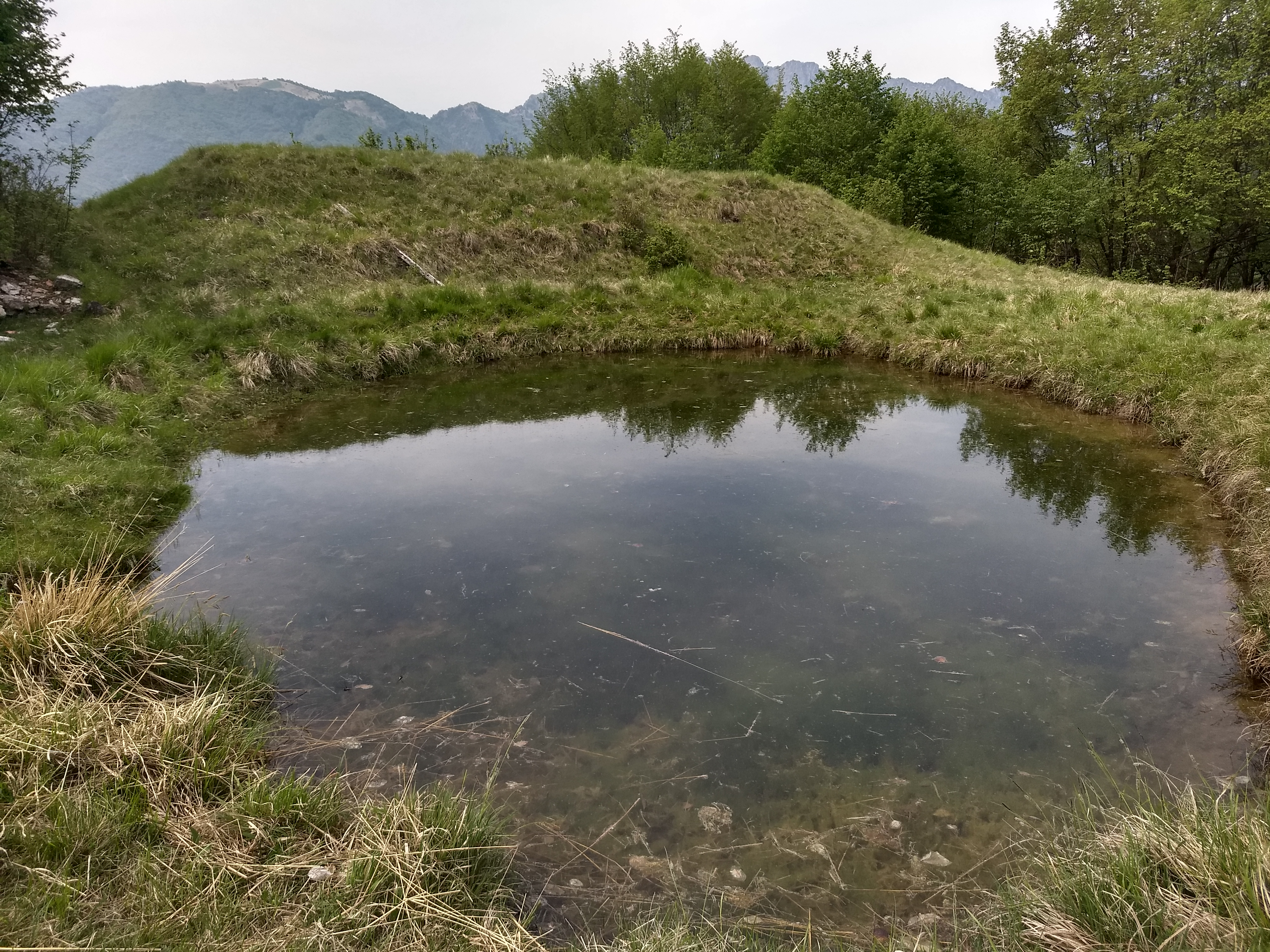
Mount Tavagnone, detail of the watering hole known locally as the "lavàc" of the former Battista Corsetti fund known as "Prandini"

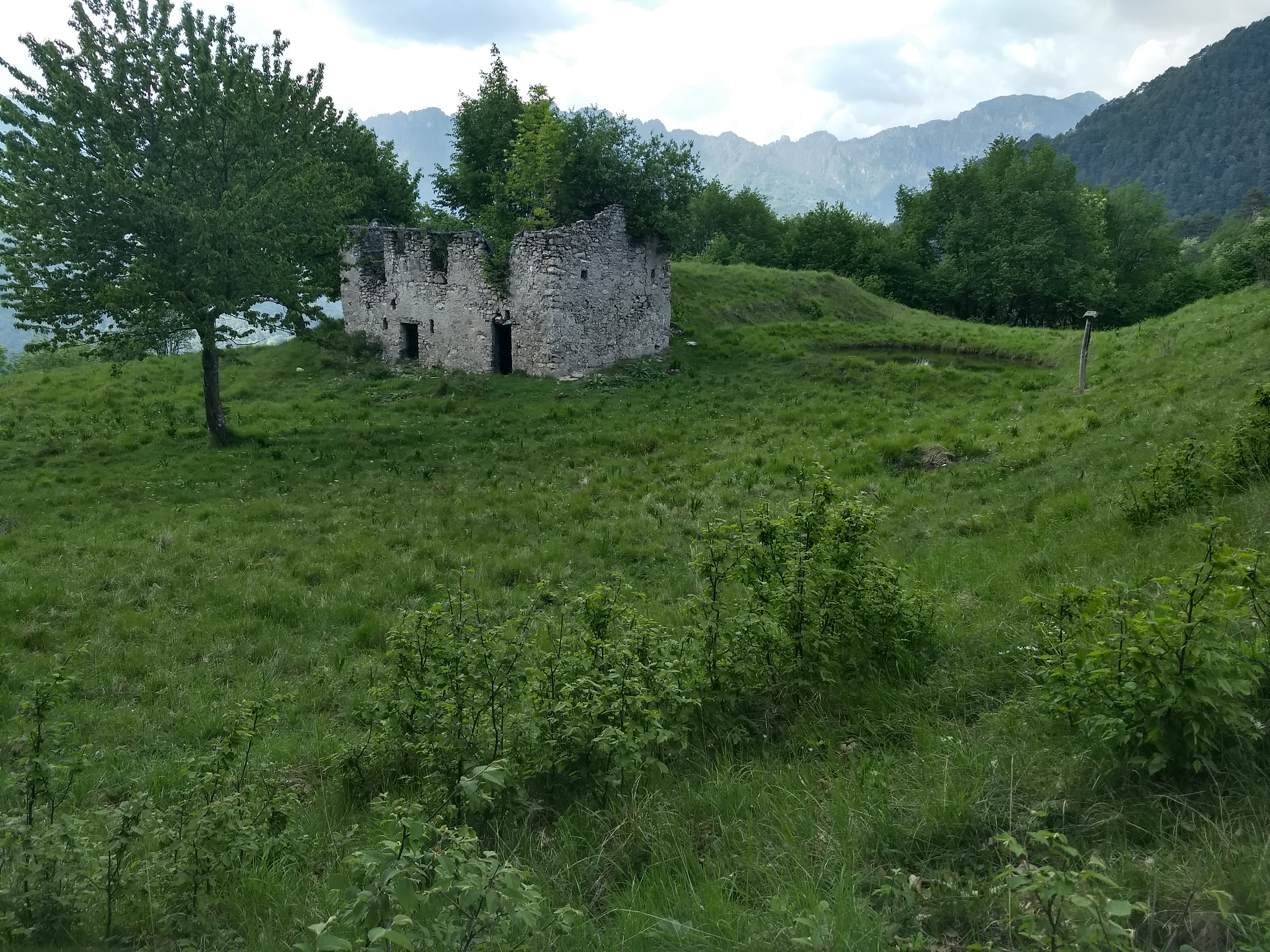
Mount Tavagnone, ruins of the former Battista Corsetti fund known as "Prandini"

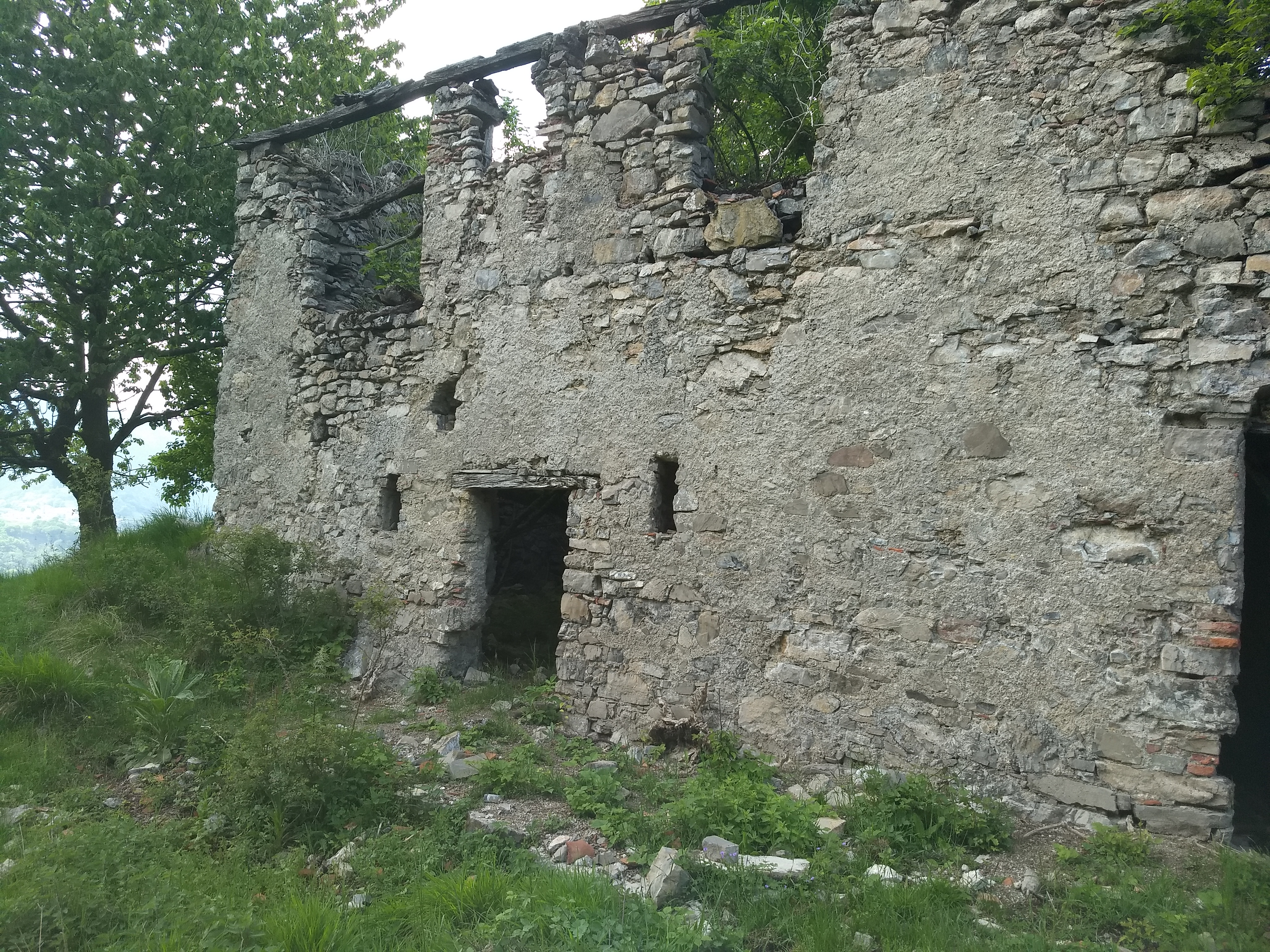
Mount Tavagnone, ruins of the former Battista Corsetti "Prandini" fund.

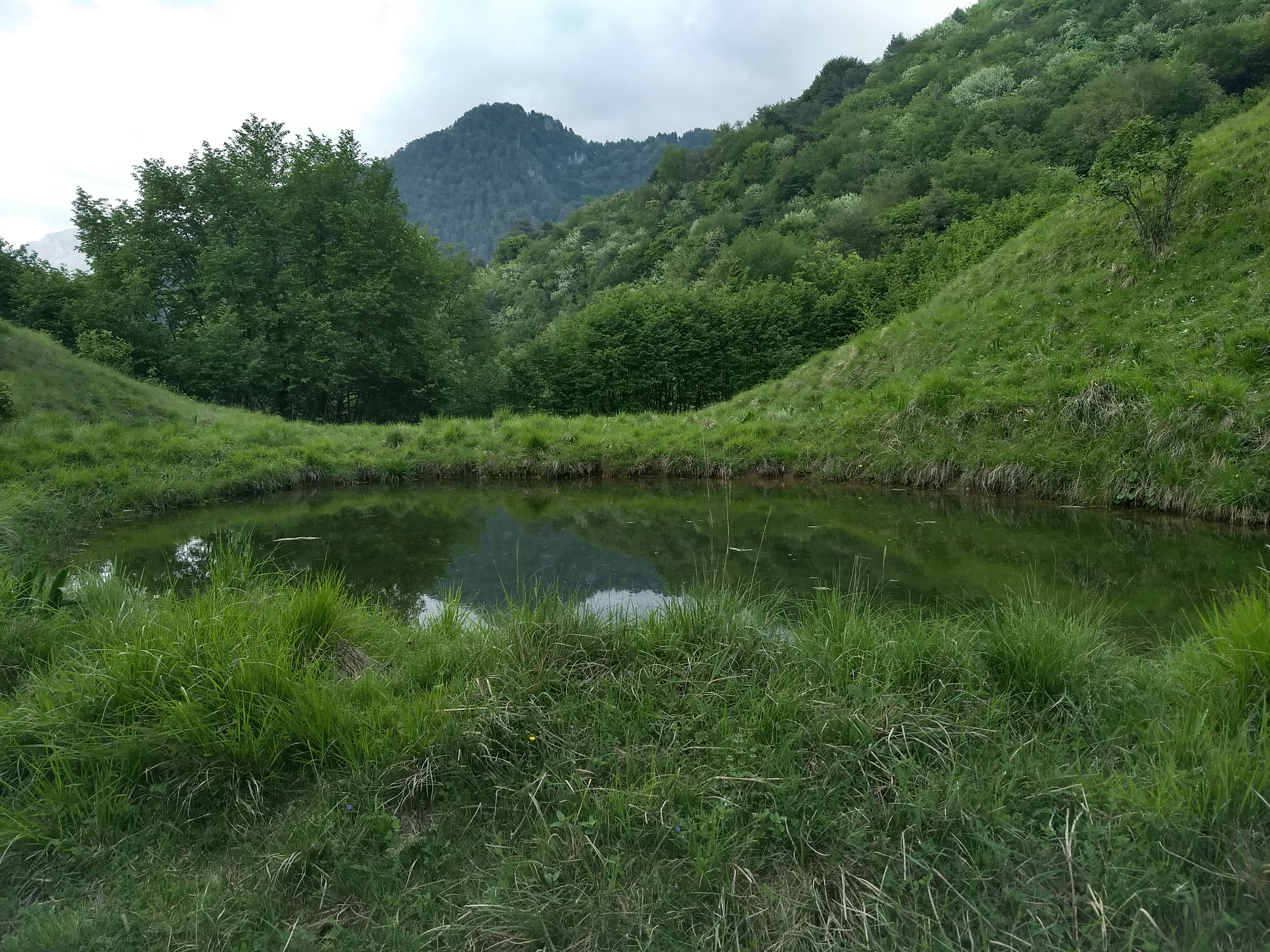
Mount Tavagnone, watering hole known as the "Prandini" watering hole, in the background Cima Camiolo or Pesòc

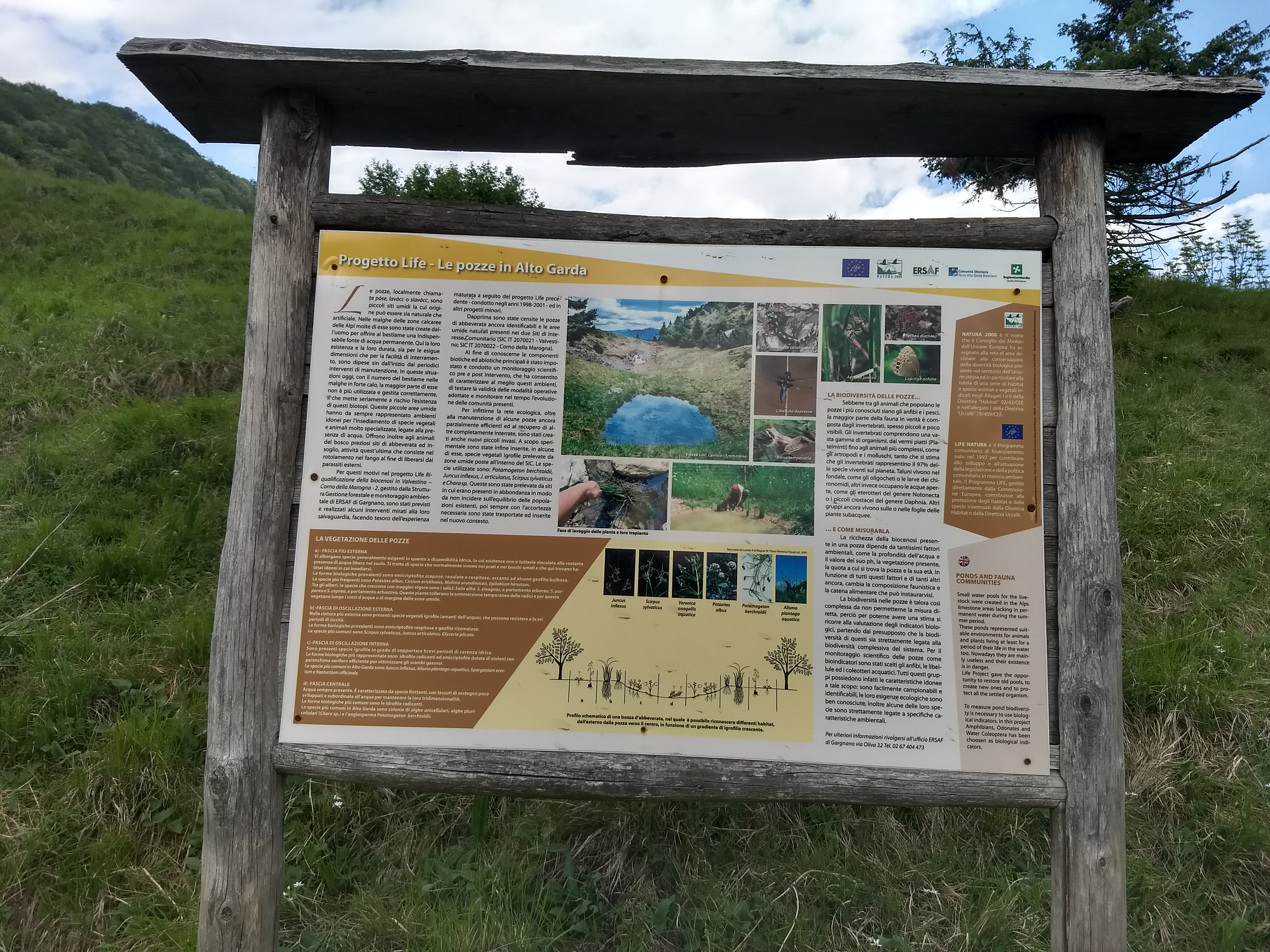
Mount Tavagnone, ERSAF Lombardy information panel at the "Prandini" waterhole

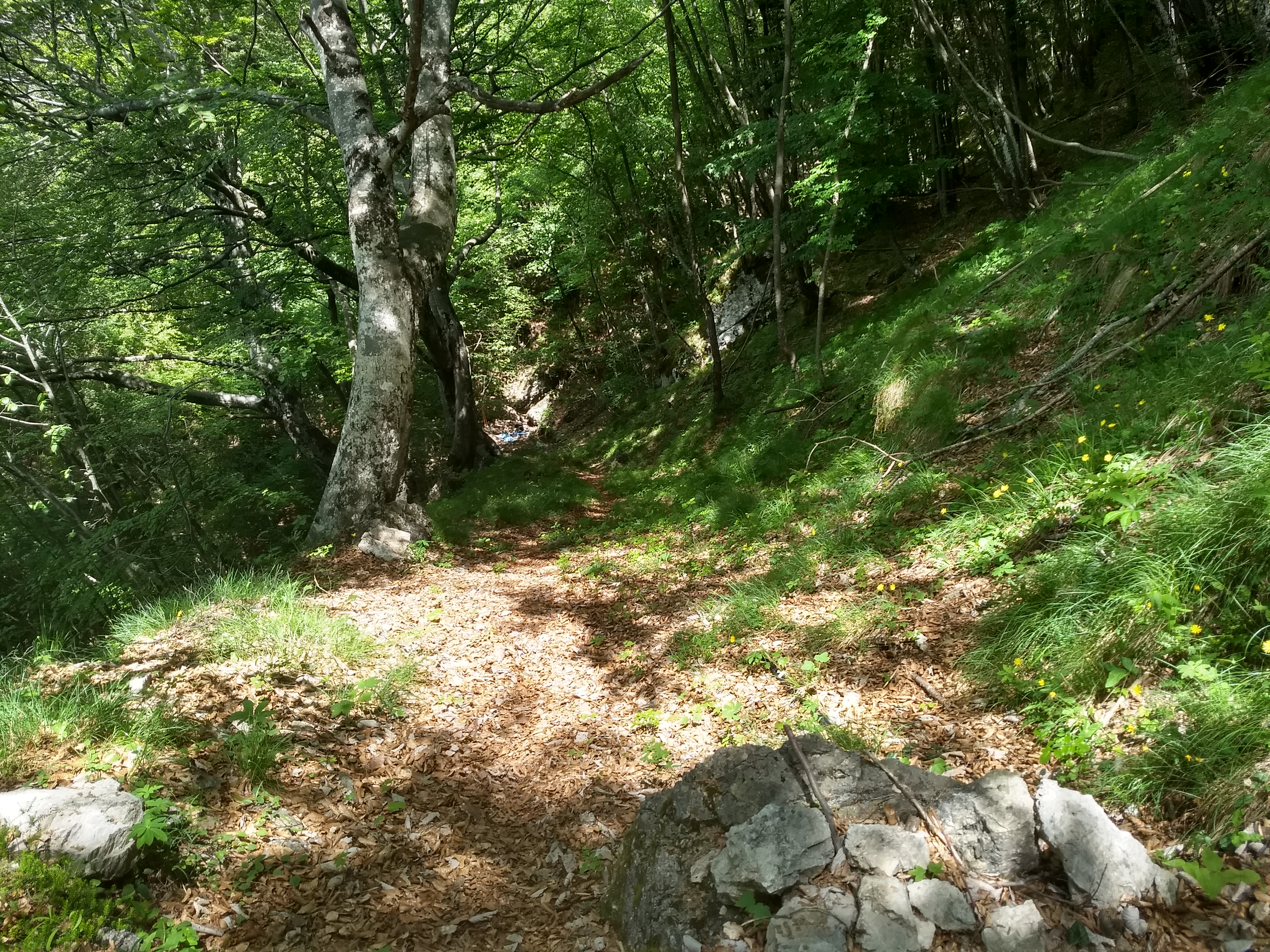
Mount Tavagnone, the ancient mule track leading to the Fucina locality and the Fontane or Acqua della Véna spring mentioned in 1511

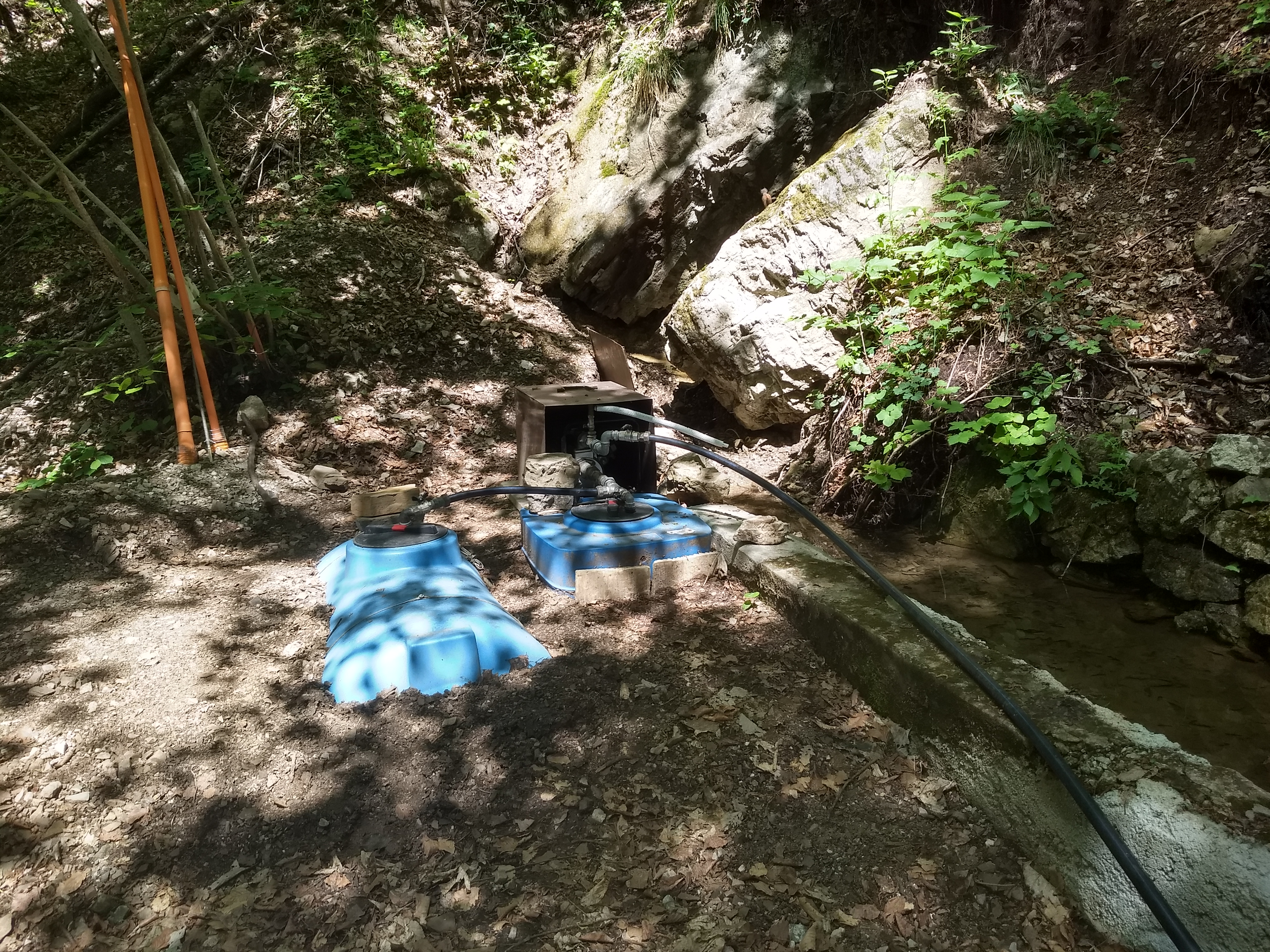
Mount Tavagnone, the spring of Fontane or Acqua della Véna

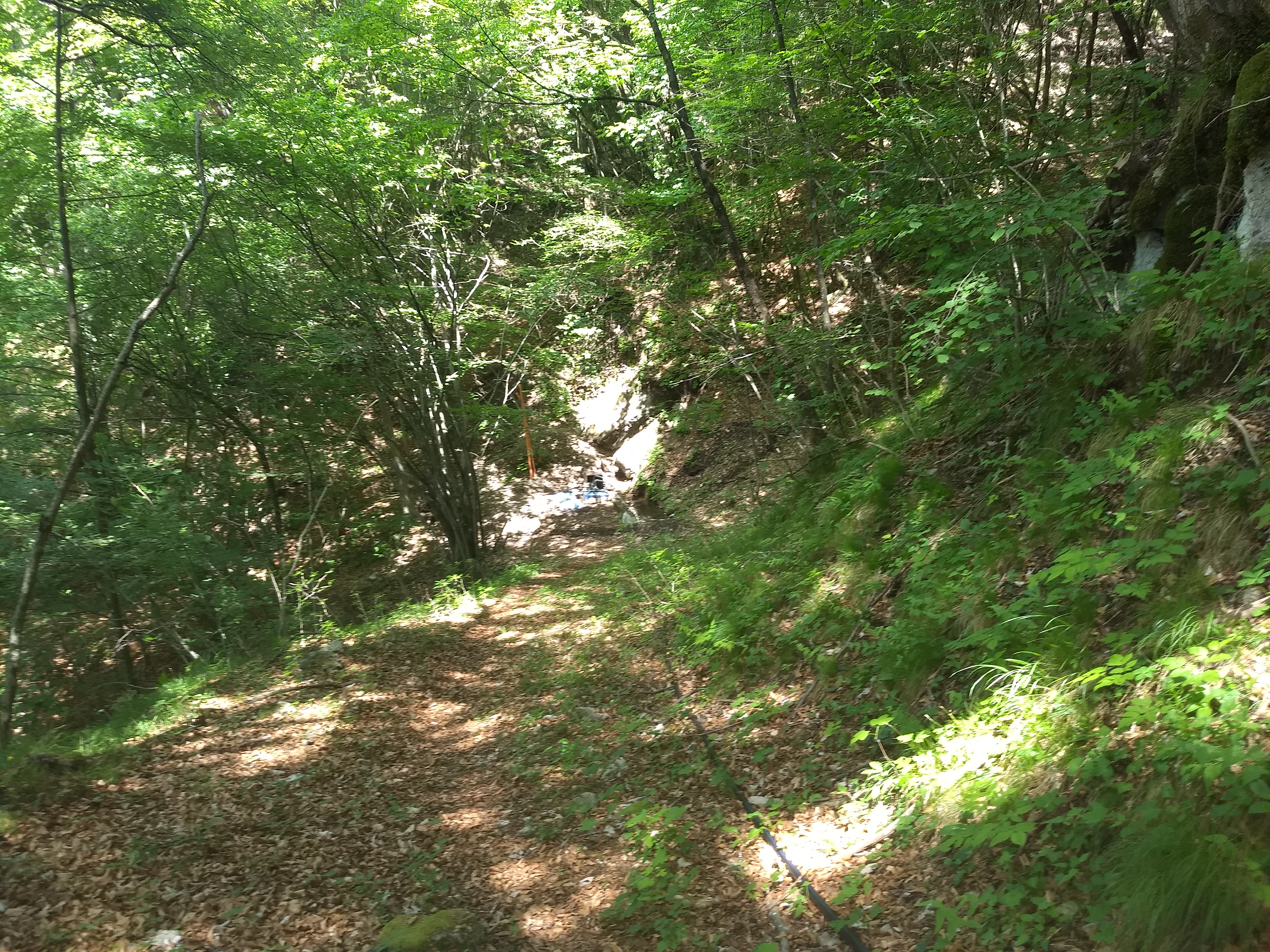
Mount Tavagnone, the spring of Fontane or Acqua della Véna

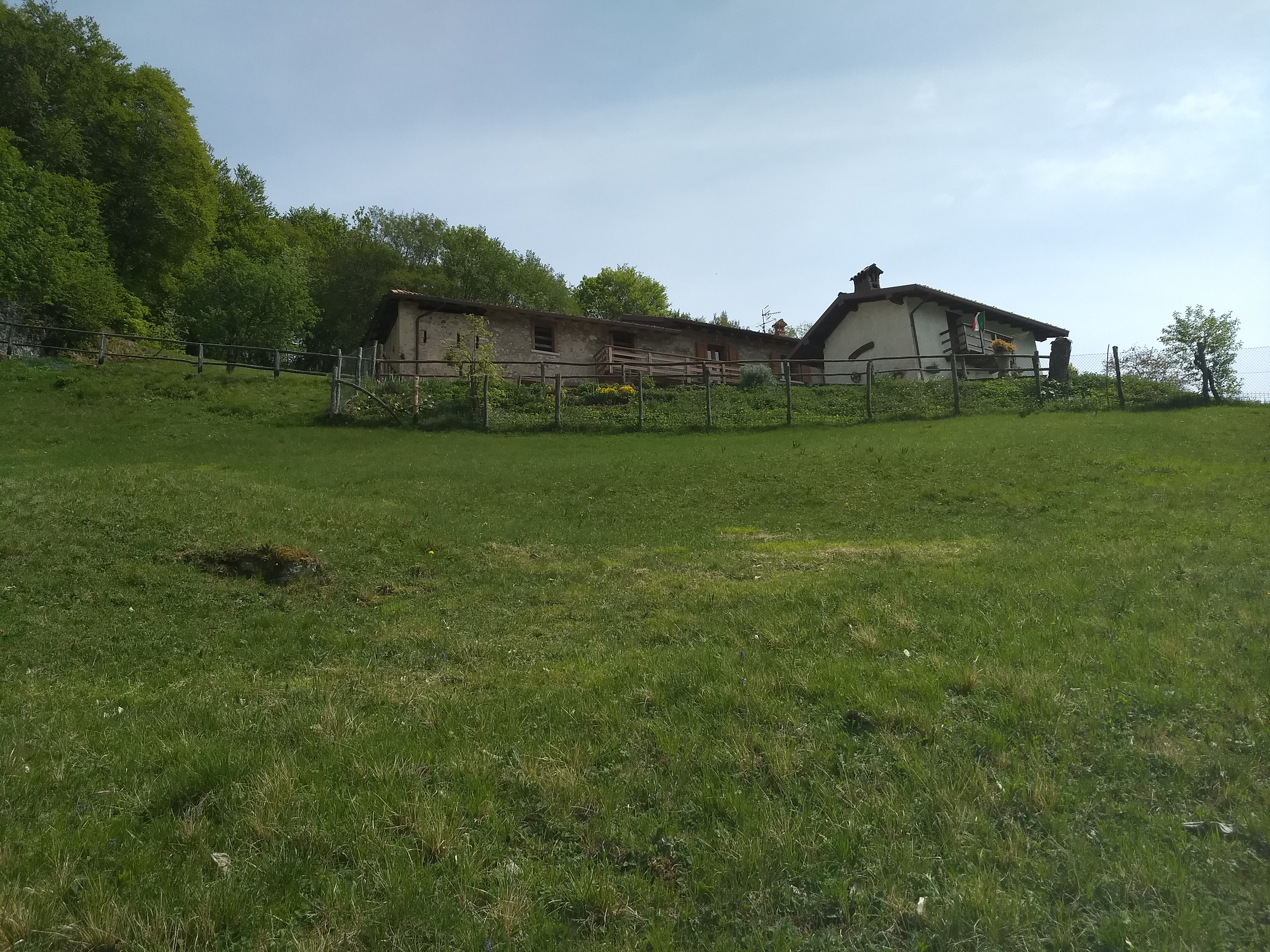
Mount Tavagnone, agricultural fund known as the Faremina

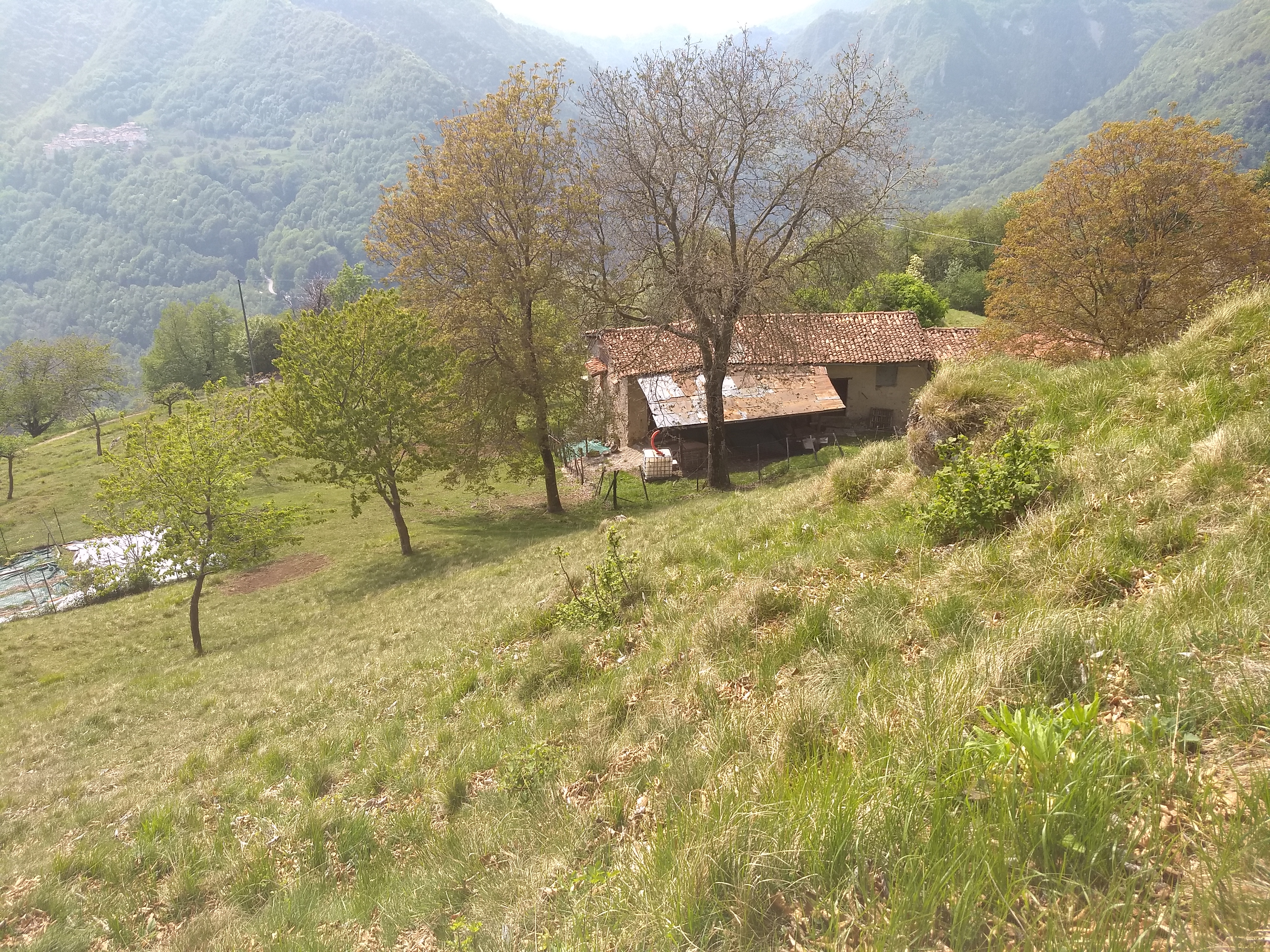
Mount Tavagnone, agricultural fund known as the Cioaröi or Sürc in the locality of Toio

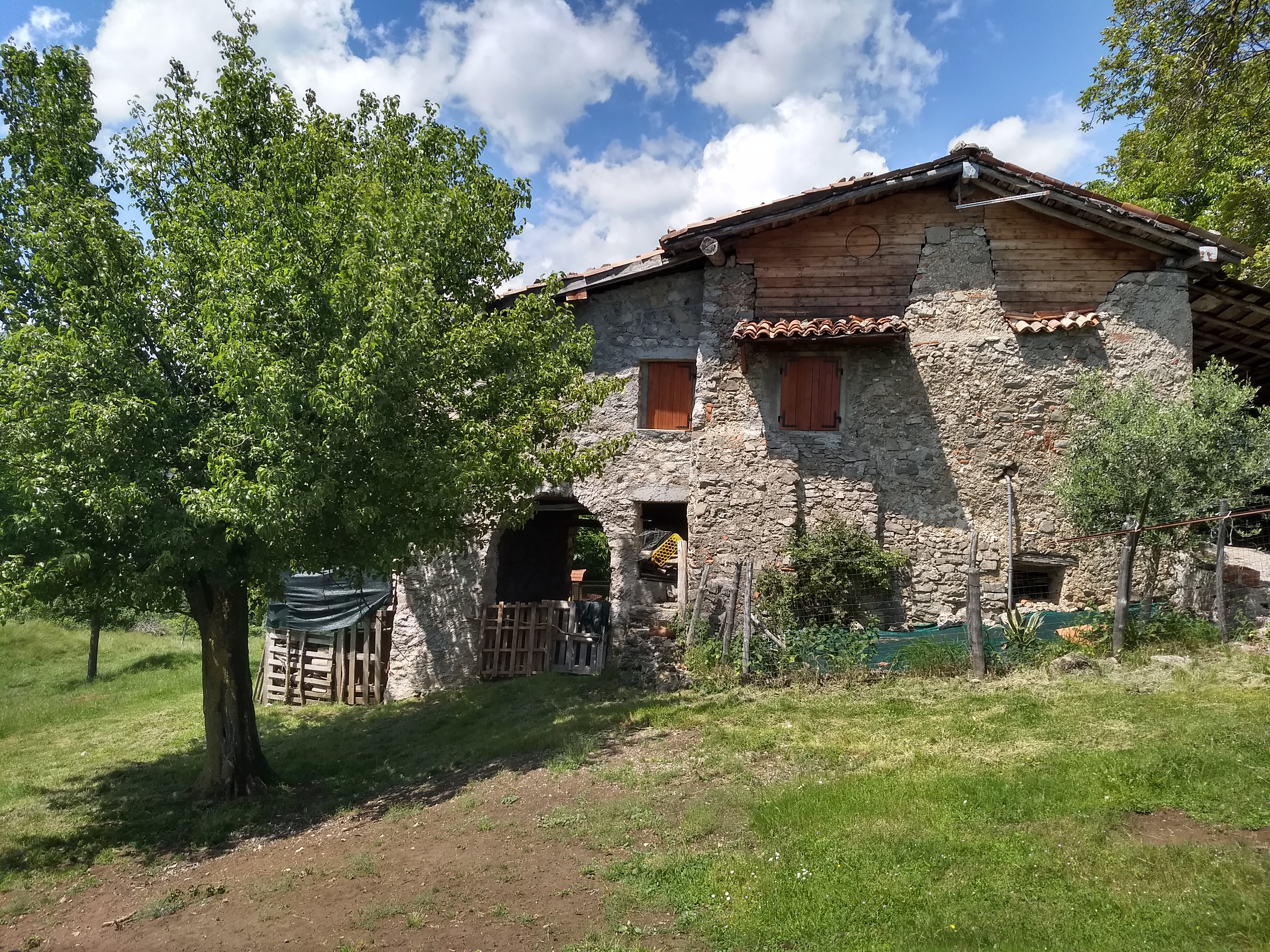
Mount Tavagnone, agricultural fund known as the Cioaröi or Sürc in the locality of Toio

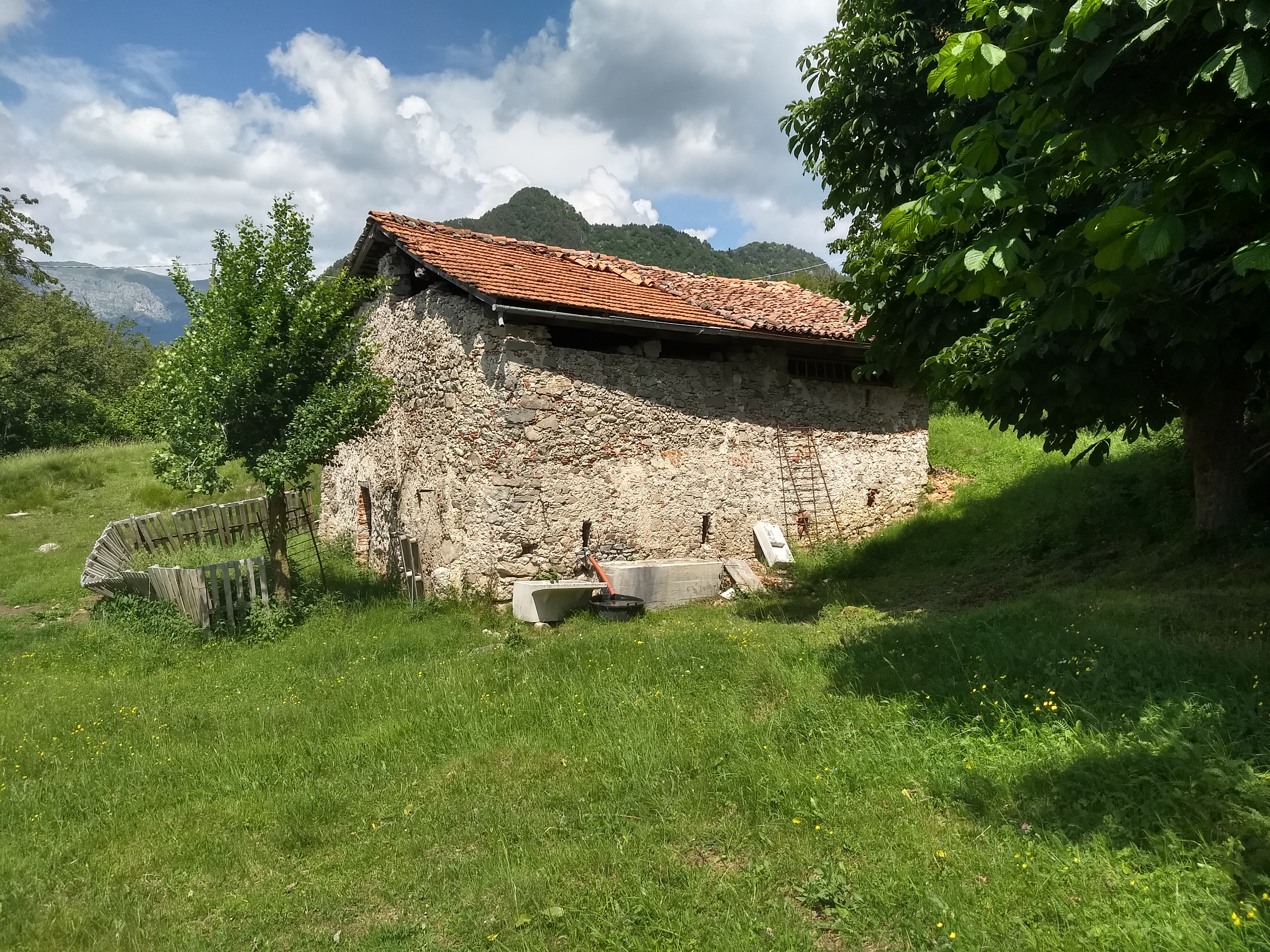
Mount Tavagnone, agricultural fund known as the Cioaröi

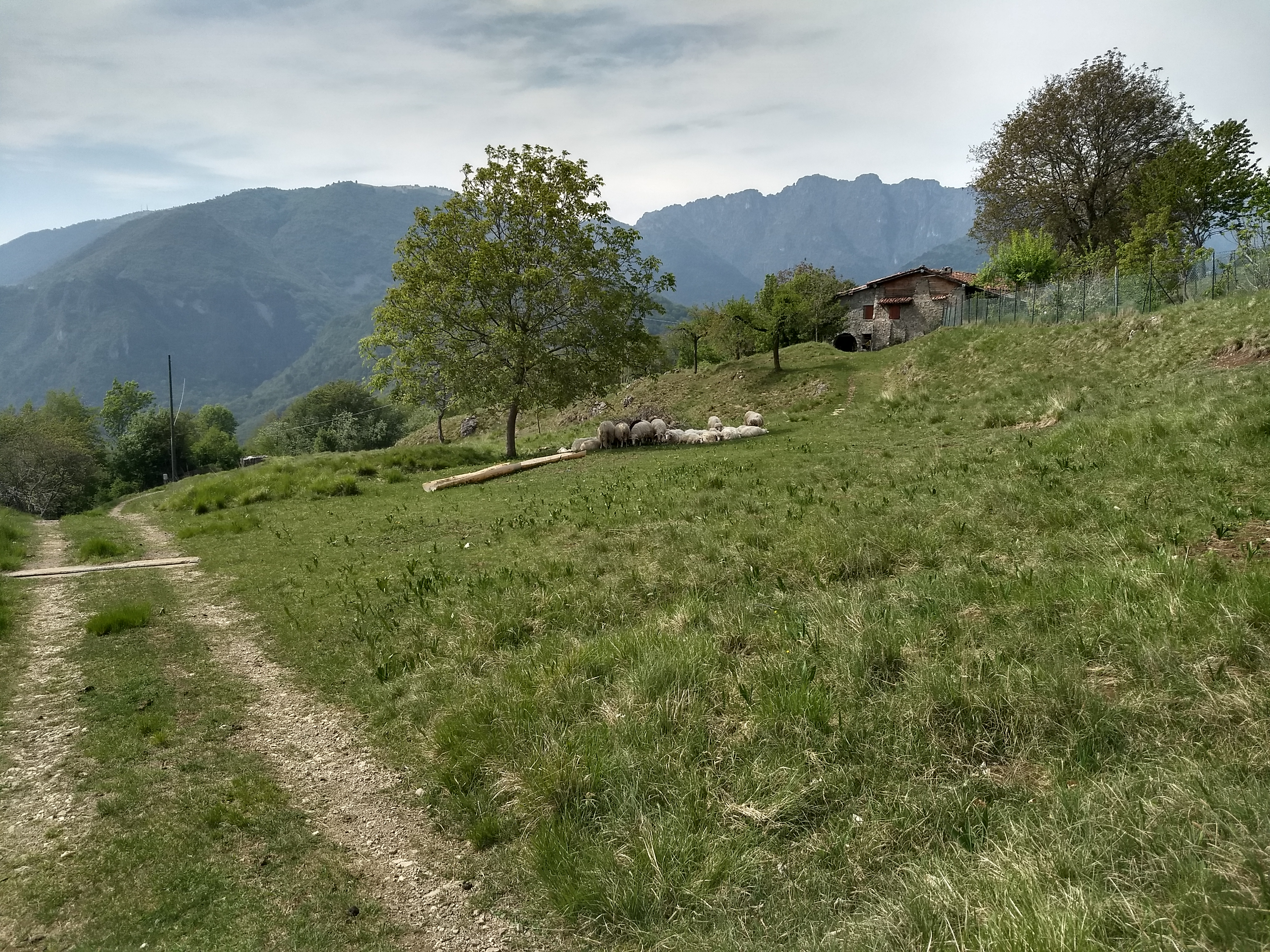
Mount Tavagnone, fund of the Cioaröi

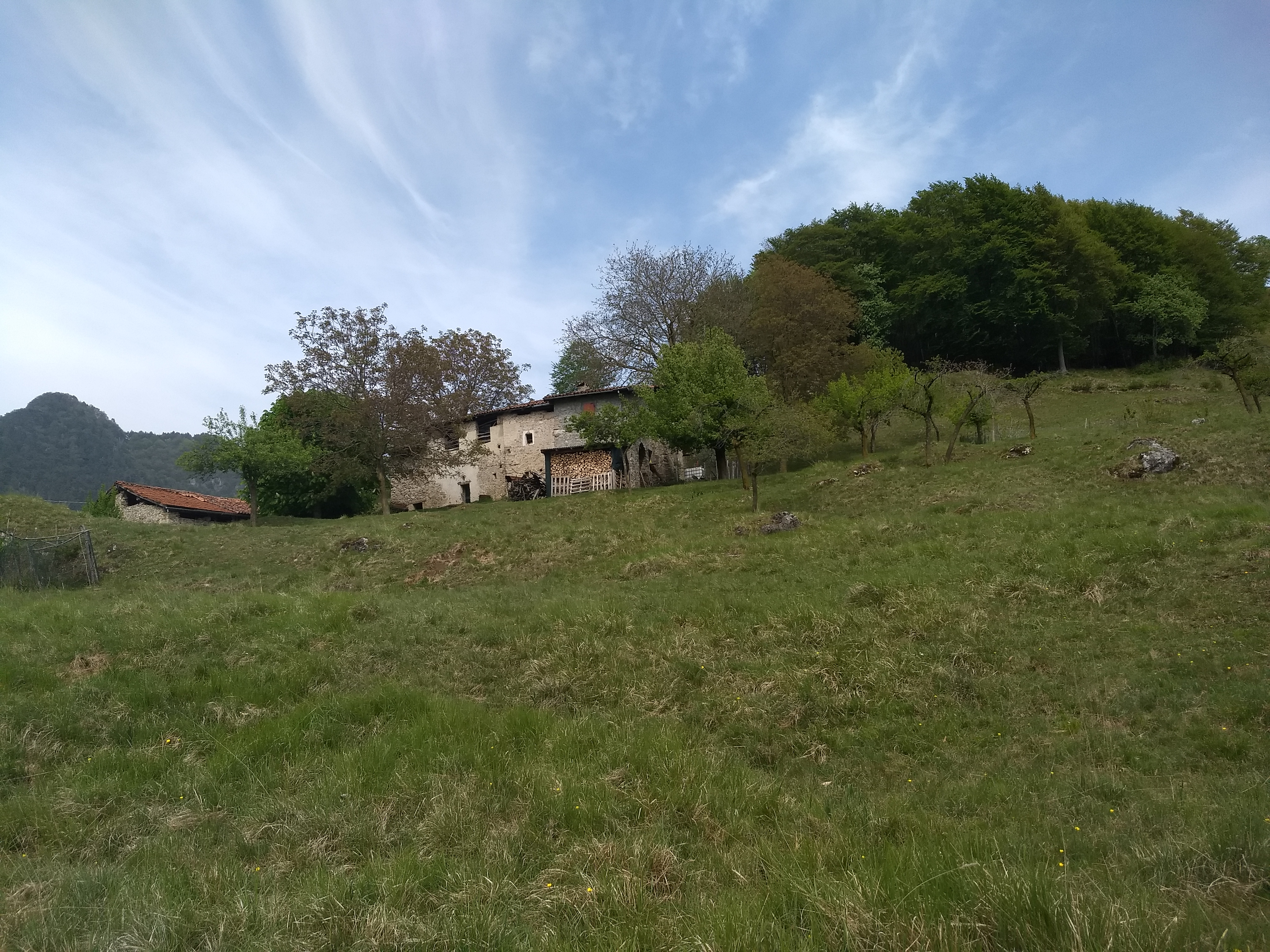
Mount Tavagnone, agricultural fund known as the Cioaröi

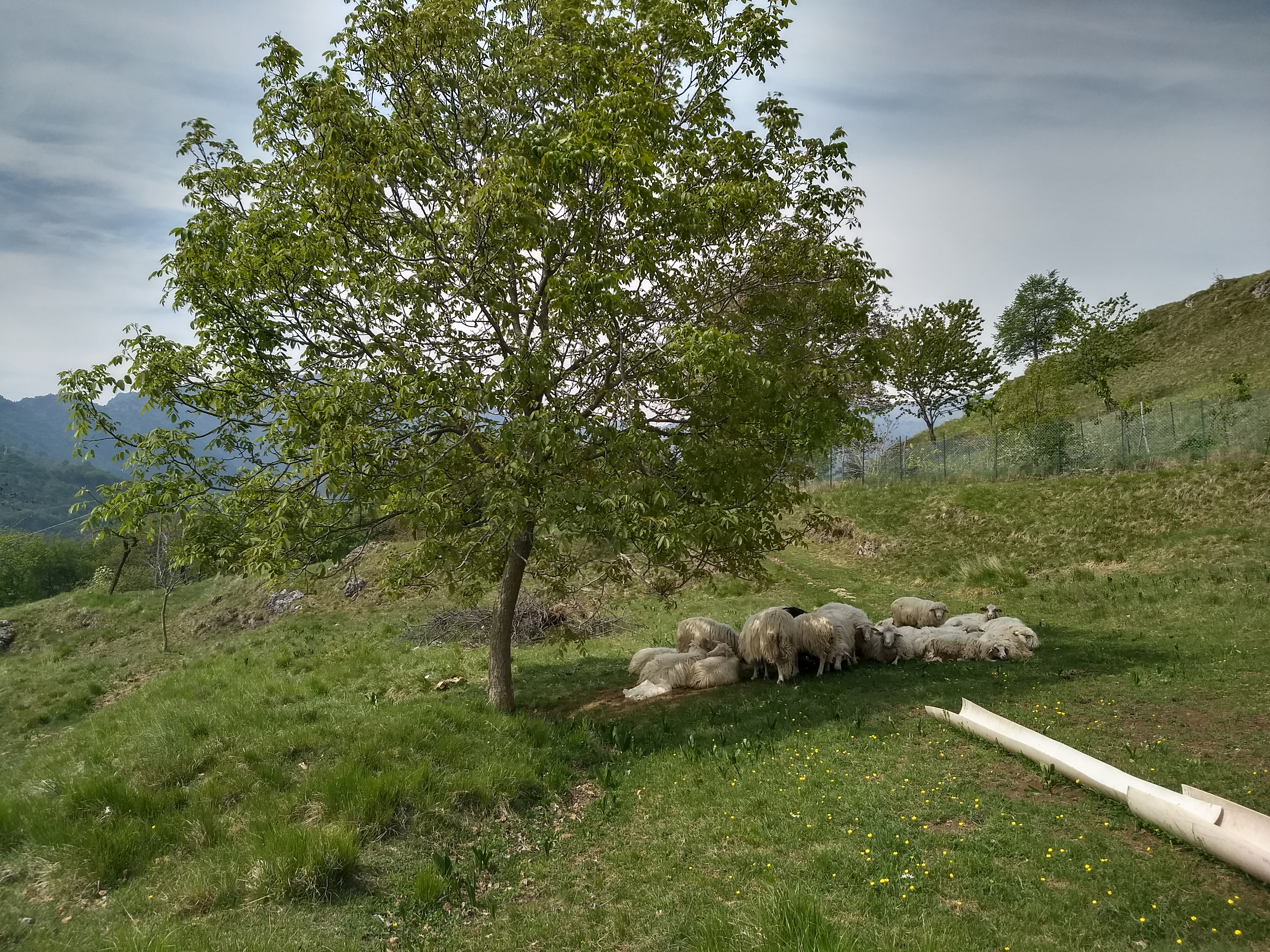
Mount Tavagnone, fund of the Cioaröi

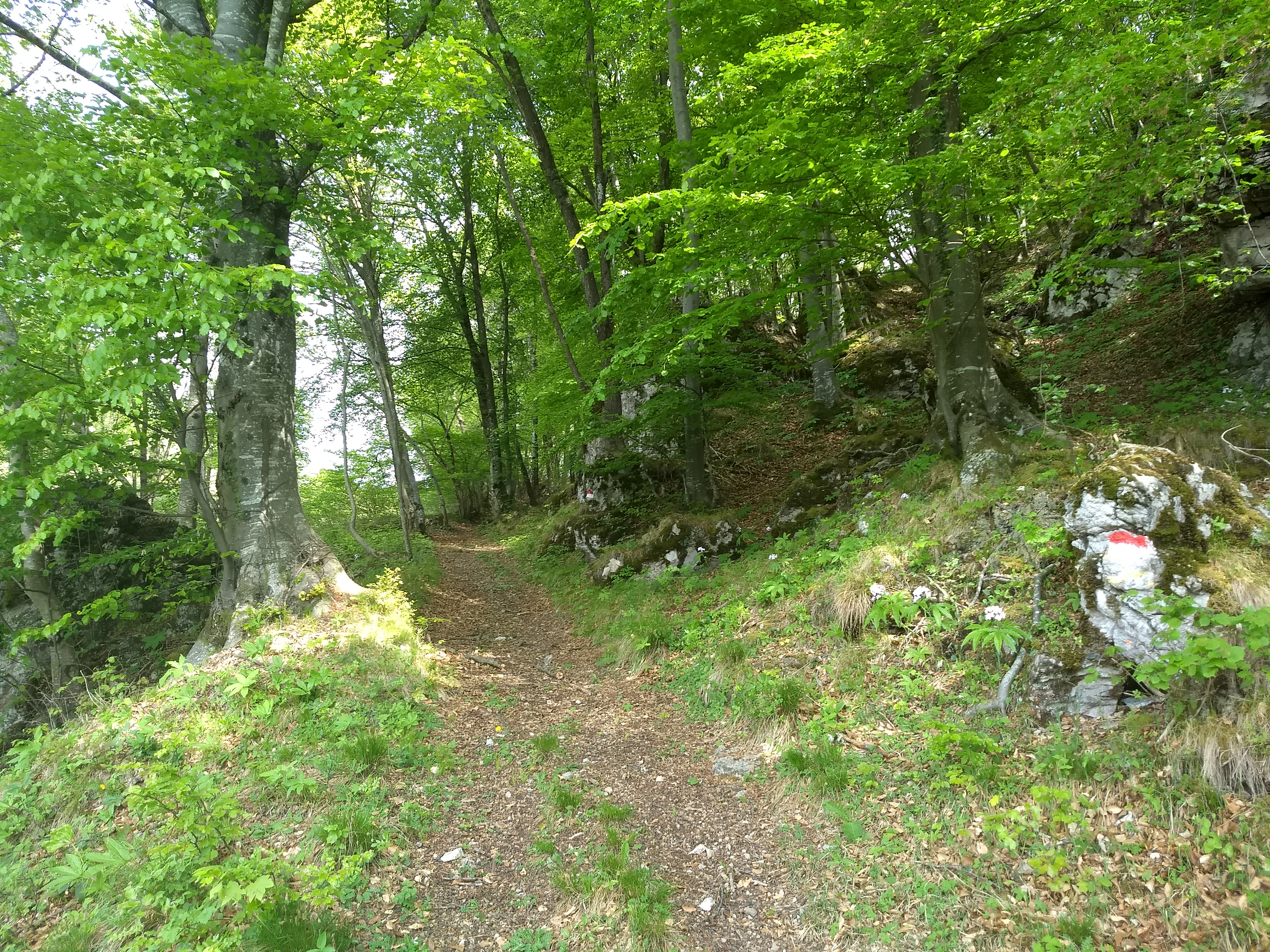
Mt. Tavagnone, mule track leading to Dos di Sas, and over the Bocca della Véna pass to Mt. Camiolo or Droane

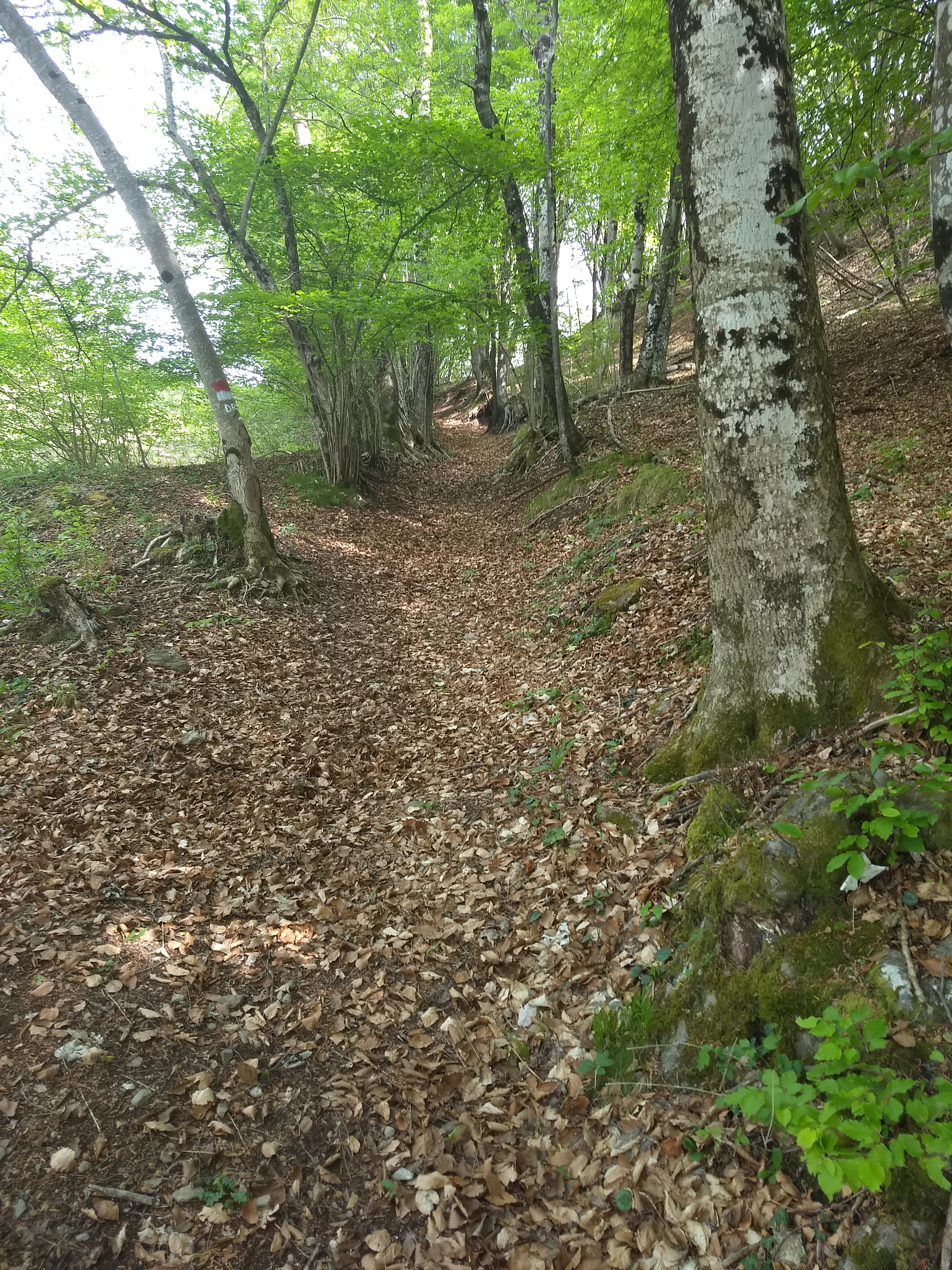
Mount Tavagnone, mule track below the Dos di Sas and near the Bocca della Véna pass leading into the Droanello valley

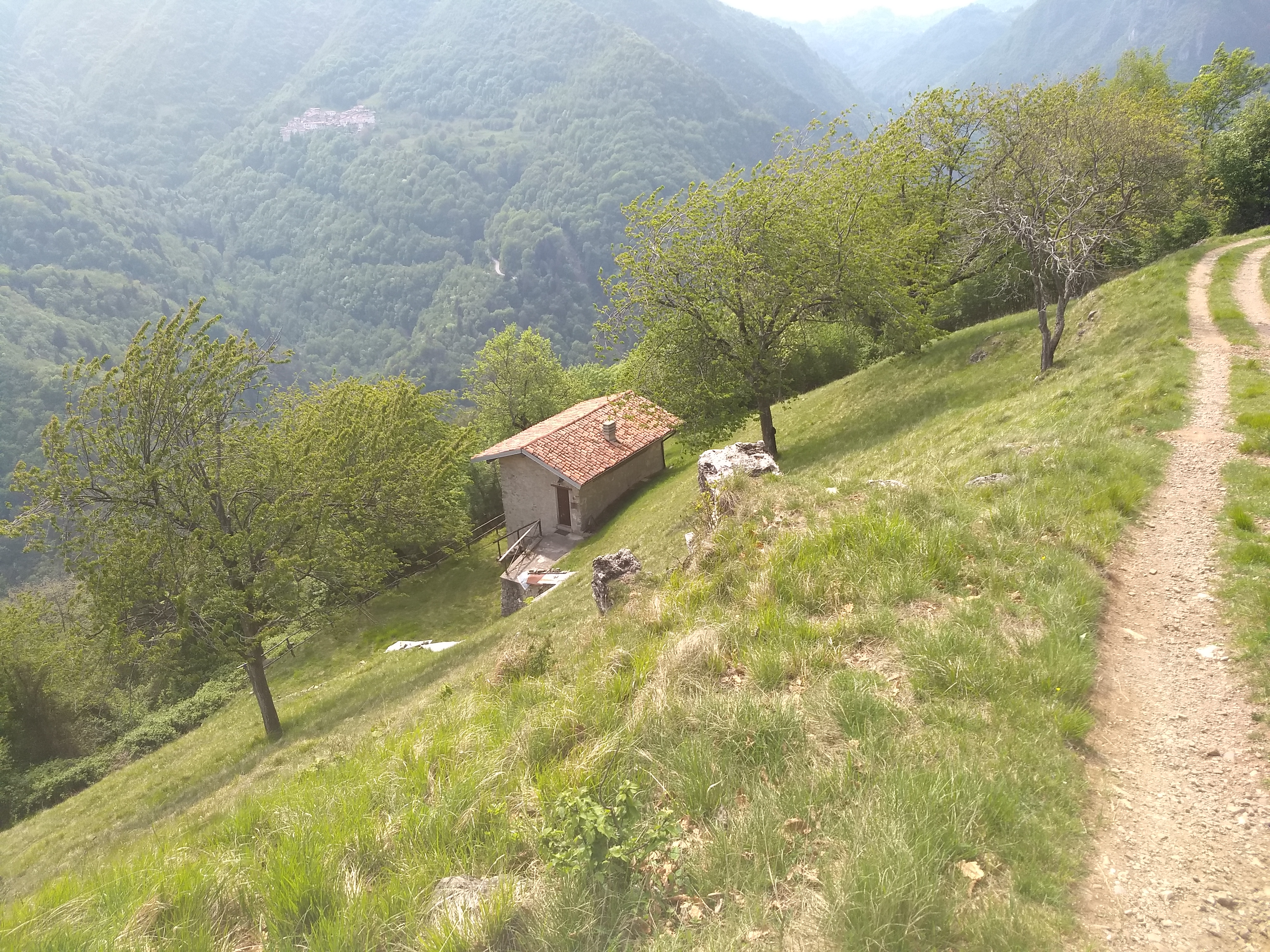
Mount Tavagnone, Salvadori agricultural fund and in the background the village of Bollone

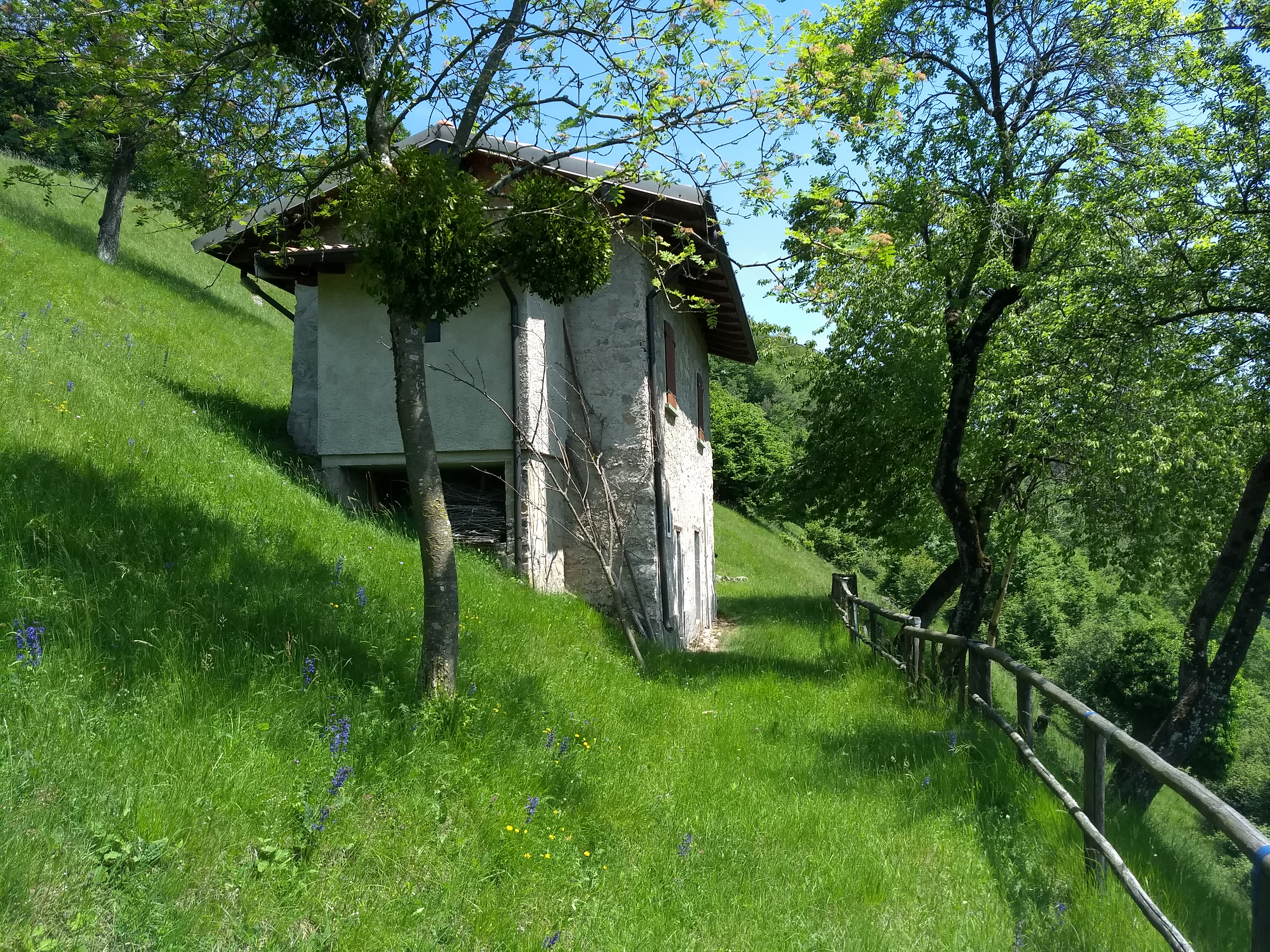
Mount Tavagnone, Salvadori agricultural fund

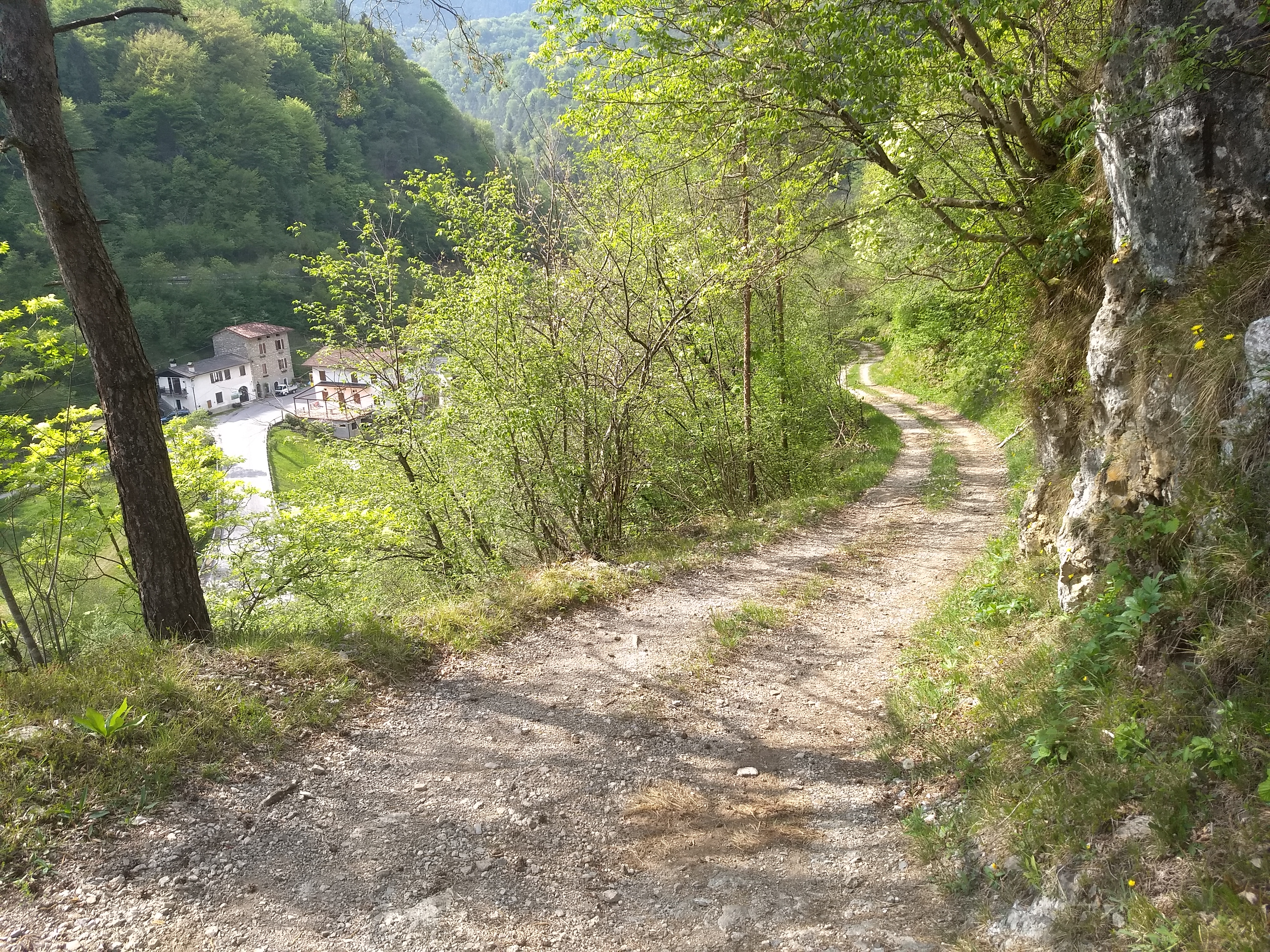
Mount Tavagnone, the forest road from Bollone Mill up to Mount Tavagnone built in the 1970s by ERSAF Lombardy

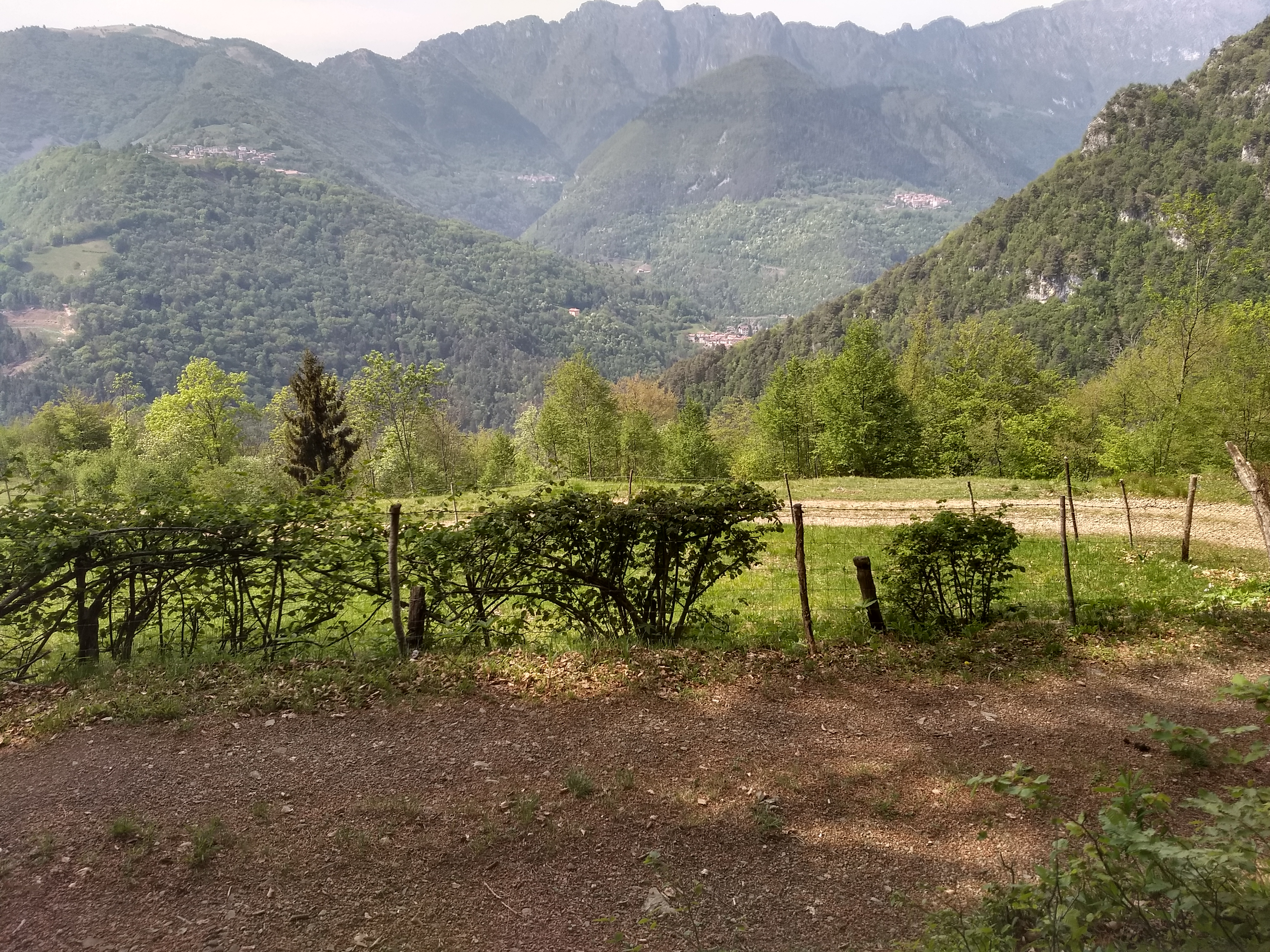
Mt. Tavagnone, from left the villages of Moerna, Persone, Turano, Armo and in the background Mt. Stino and Mt. Cingla

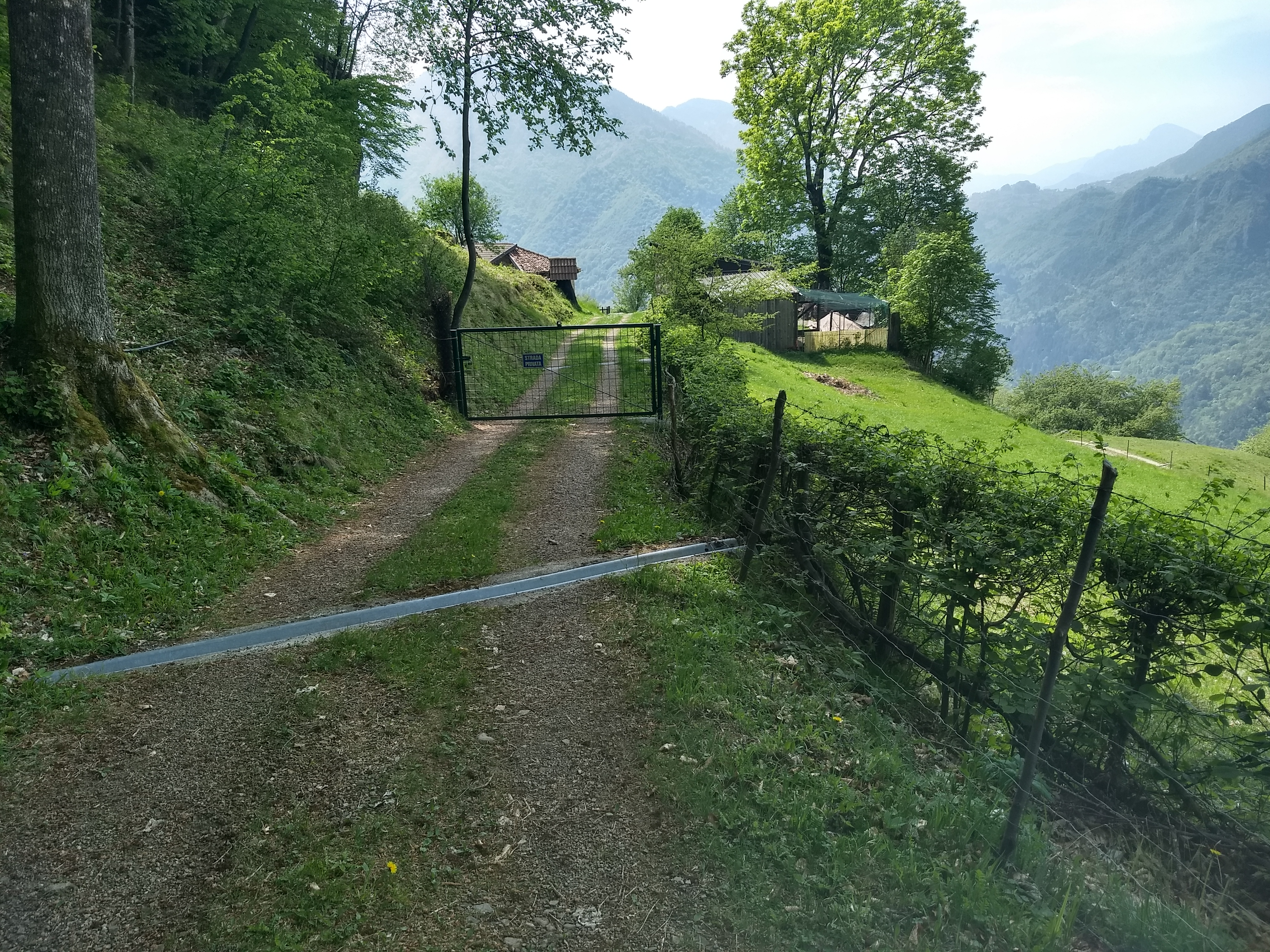
Mount Tavagnone, agricultural fund known as the Faremina

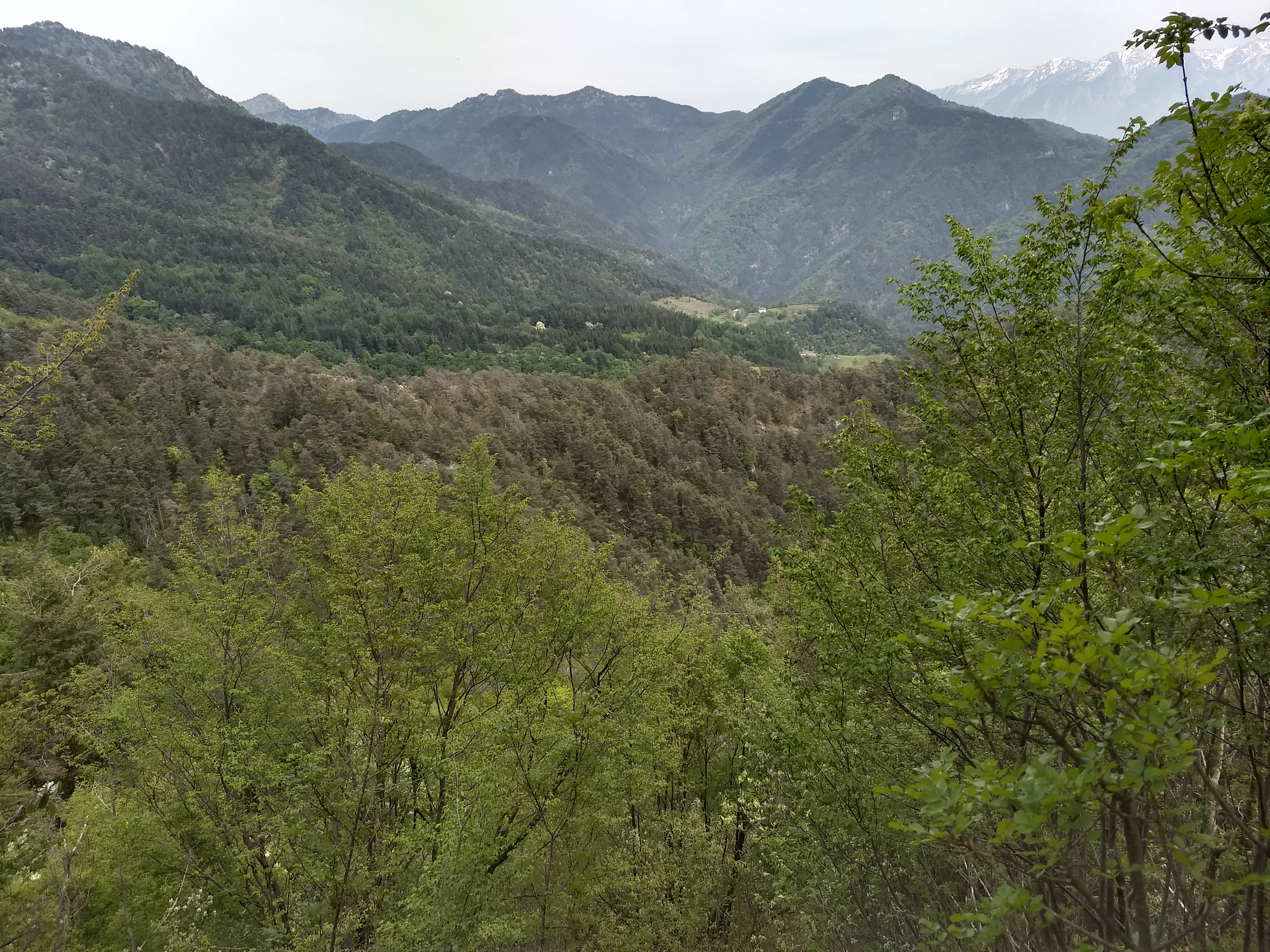
Mount Tavagnone, a view of Droane and its valley from the trail connecting Mount Camiolo with Tavagnone

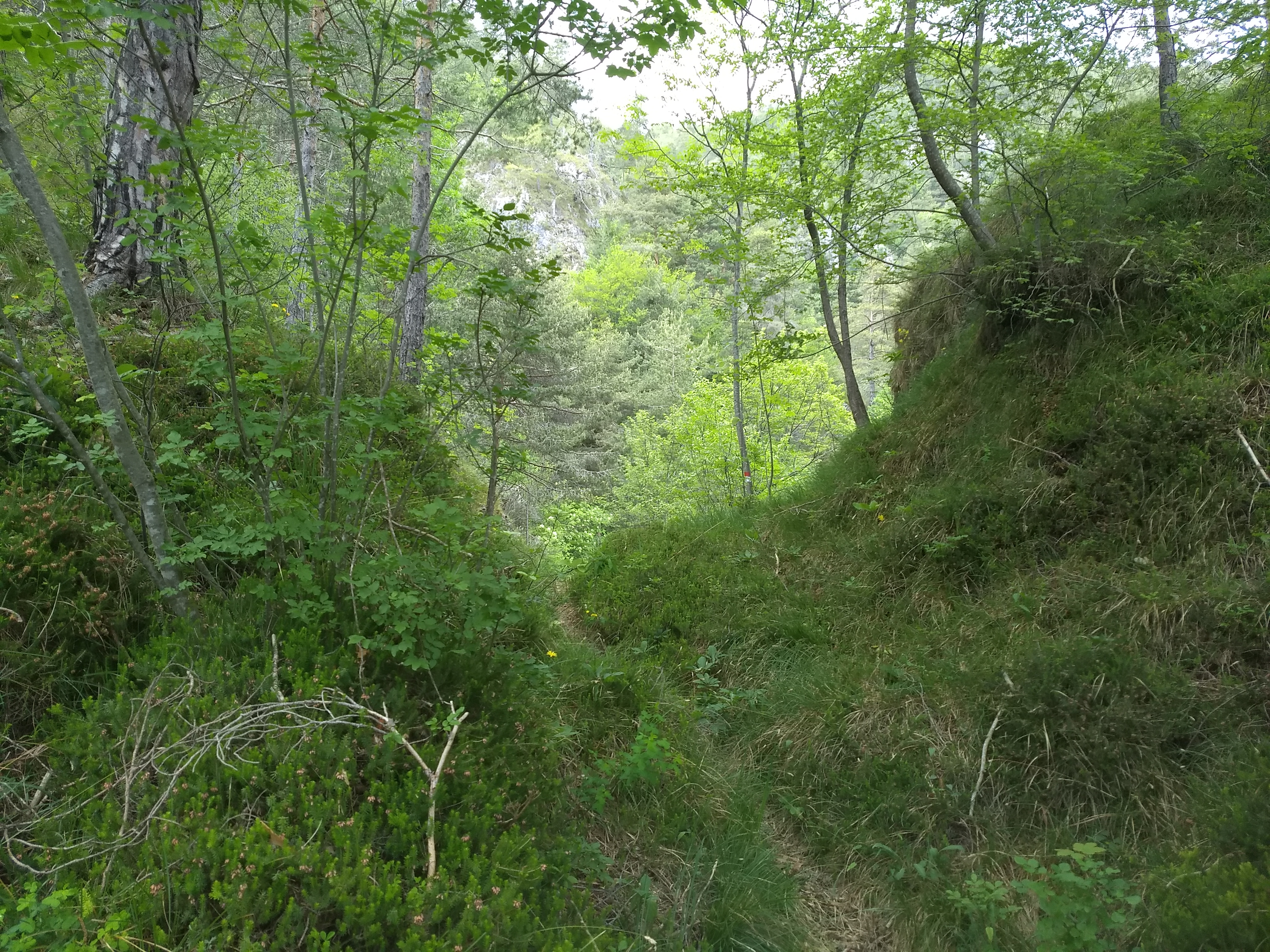
Mount Tavagnone, passage on the trail in the Droanello Valley

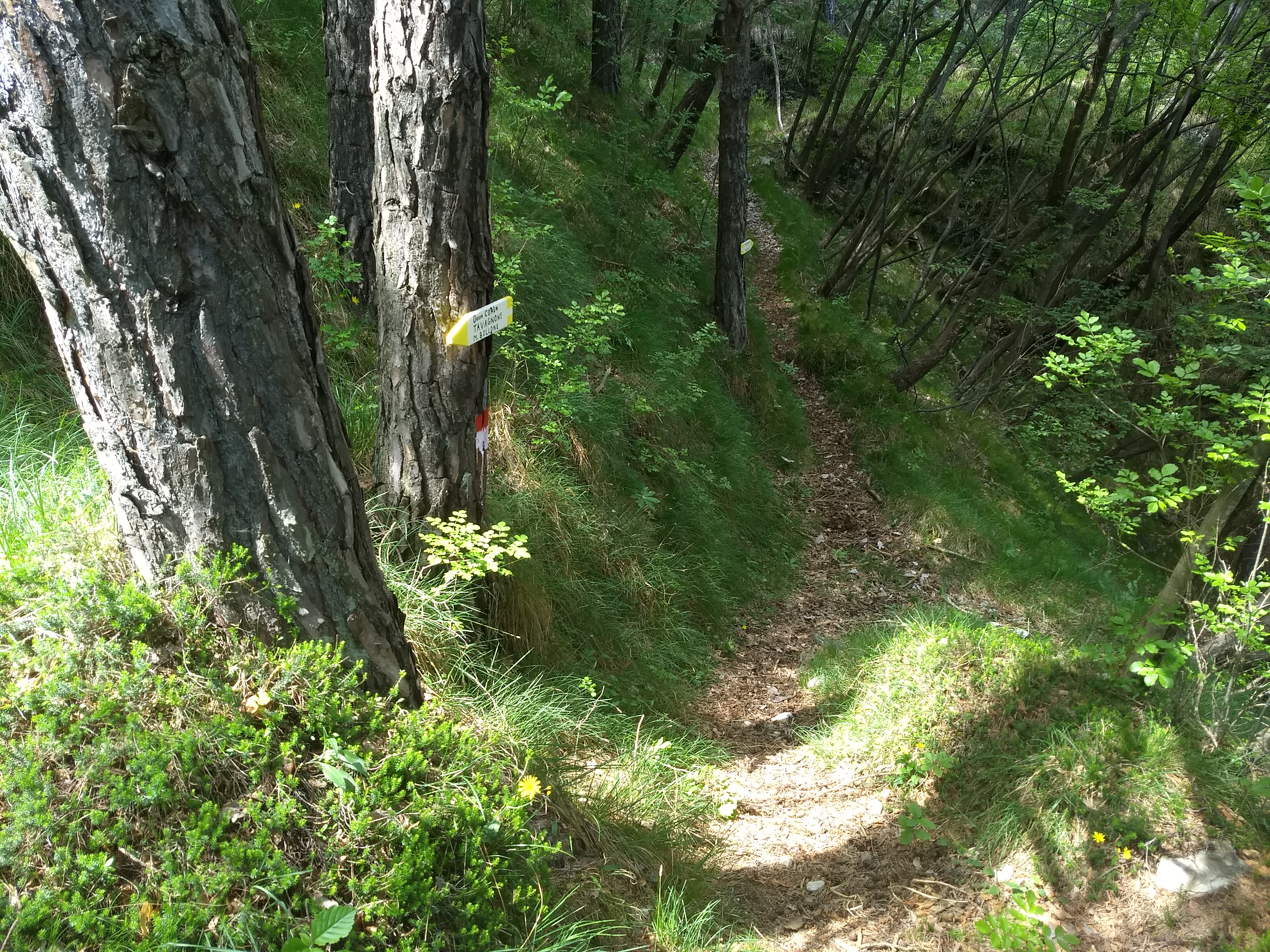
Mount Tavagnone, crossroad at Dos de le Mee of the trail at Bocca alla Croce, Tavagnone and Pavarì

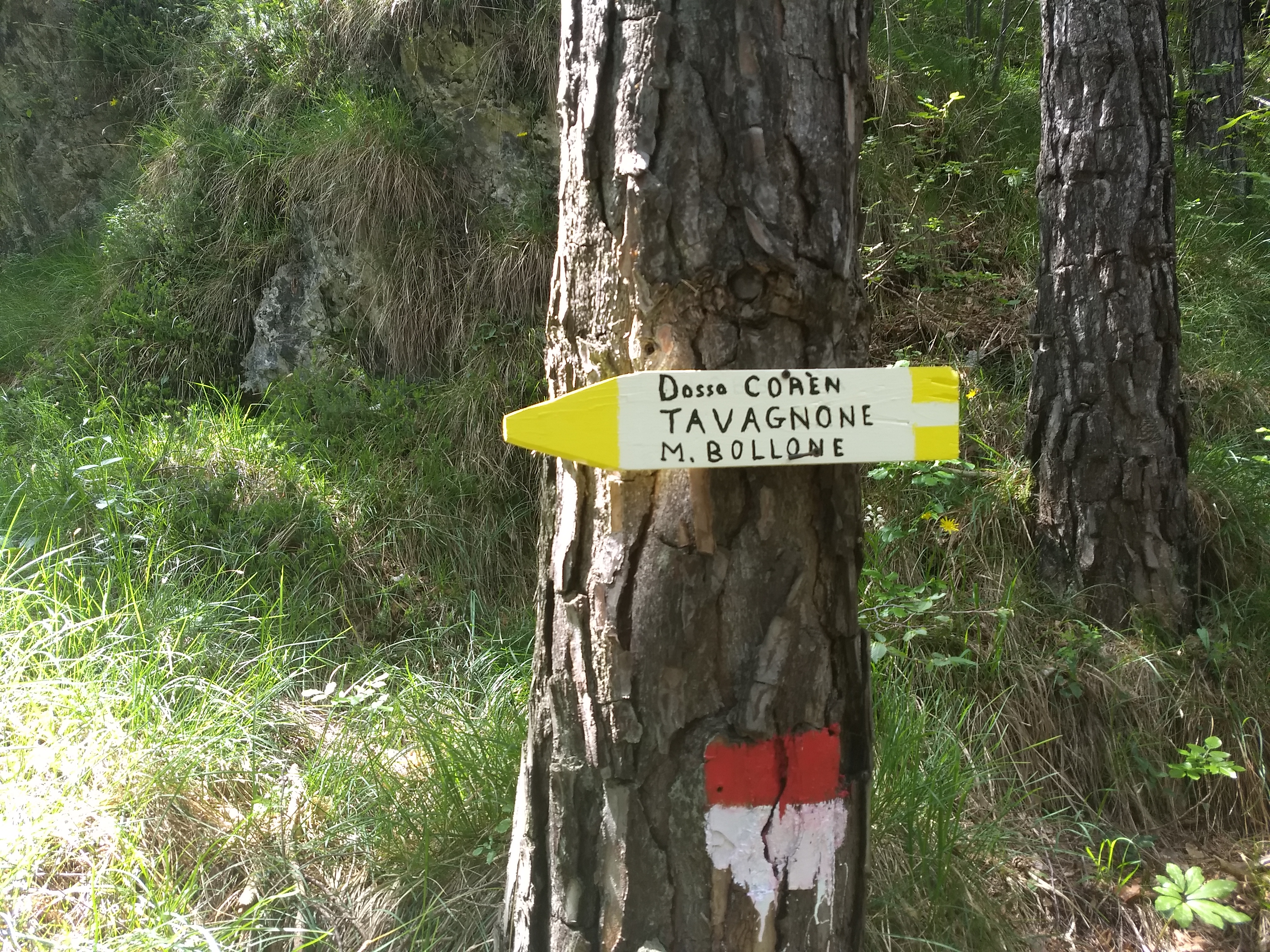
Mount Tavagnone, signage at the Dos de le Mee crossroads (a toponym derived from the dialect name given to hay sheaves: "Mee," it is mentioned in a 1511 parchment) of the trail at Bocca alla Croce, Tavagnone and Pavarì

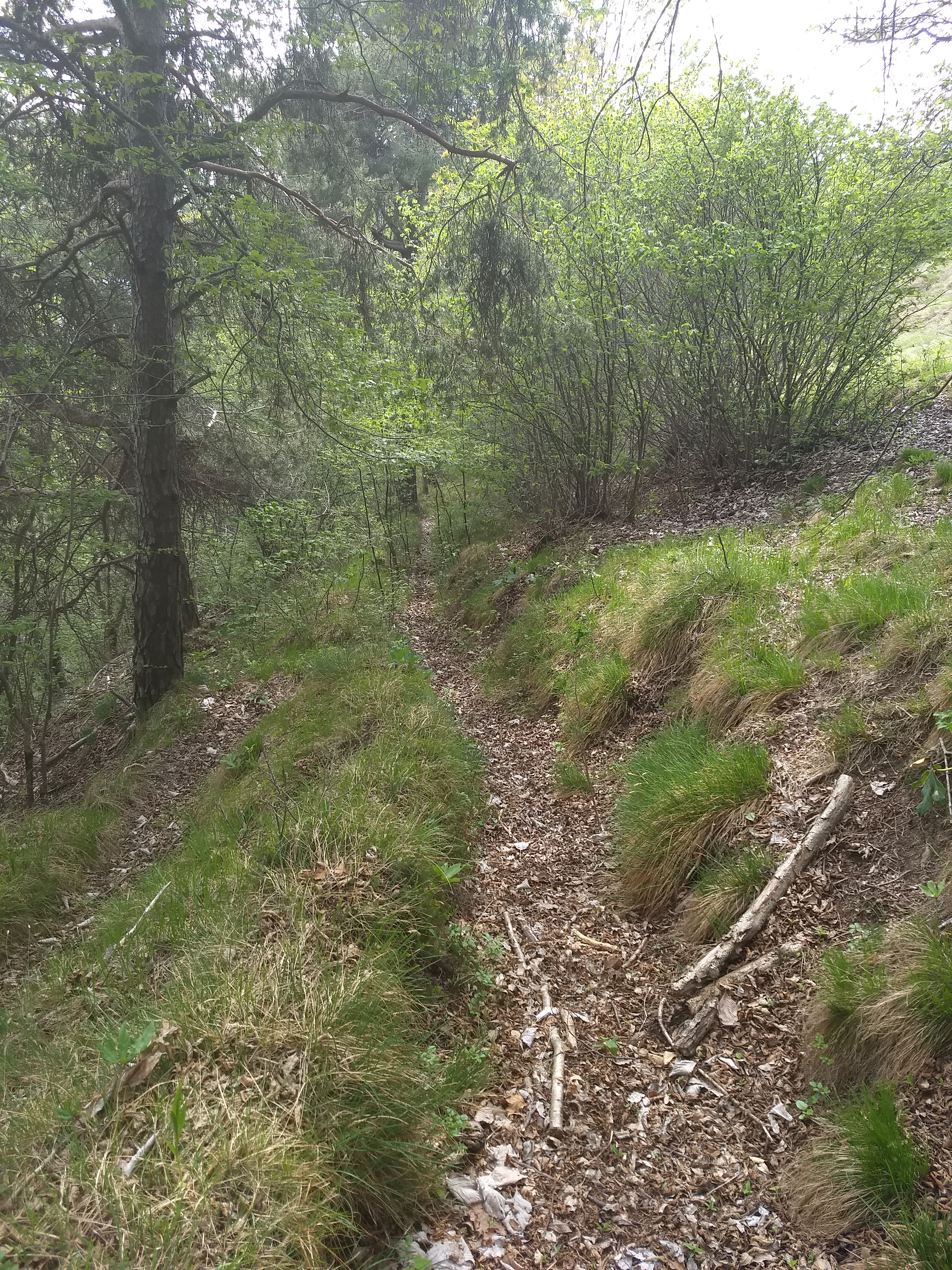
Mount Tavagnone, a glimpse of the trail in the Droanello Valley near the Prandini fund and Bocca della Véna

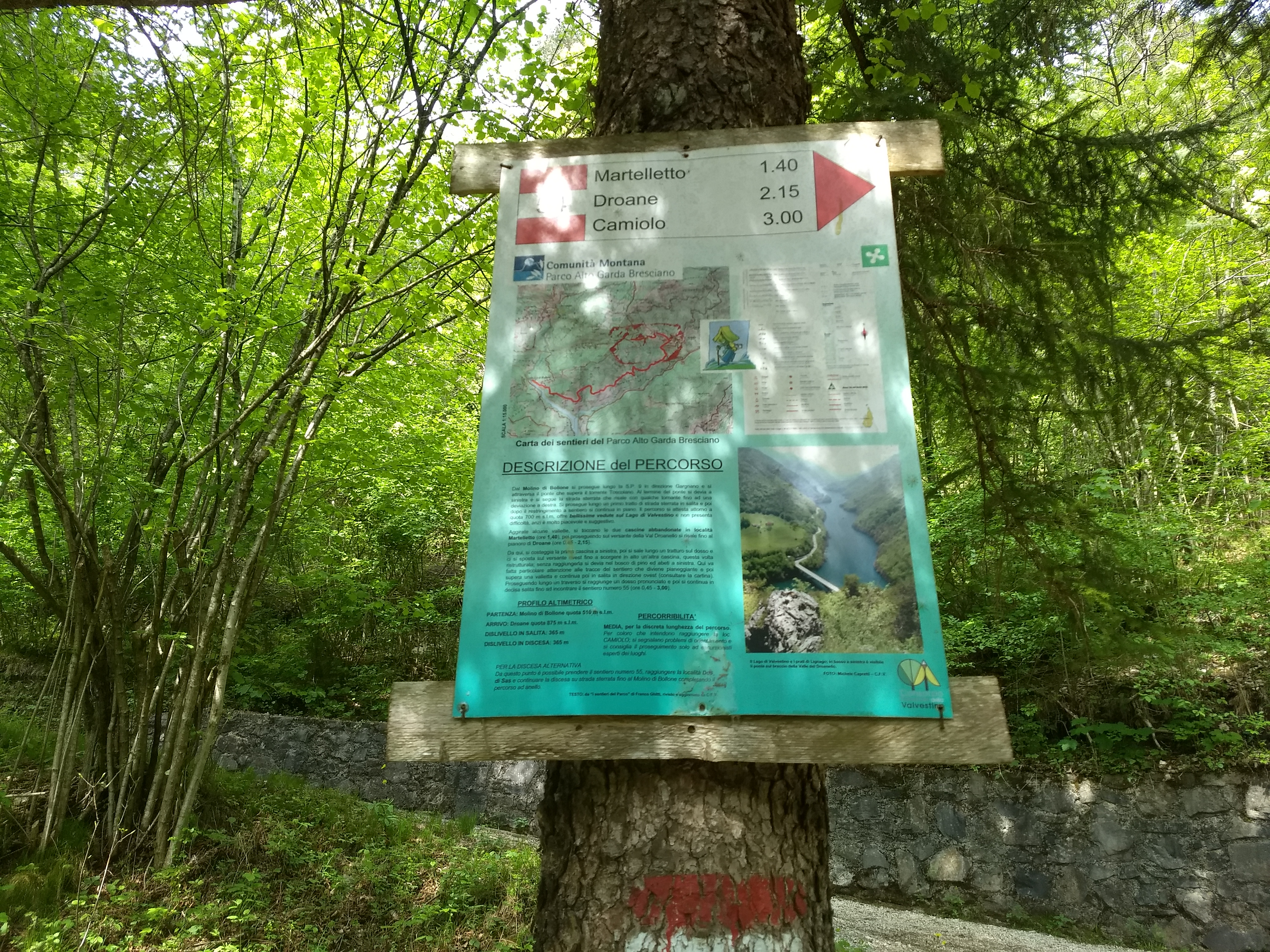
Mount Tavagnone, trail markers indicating the route to the Droanello Valley

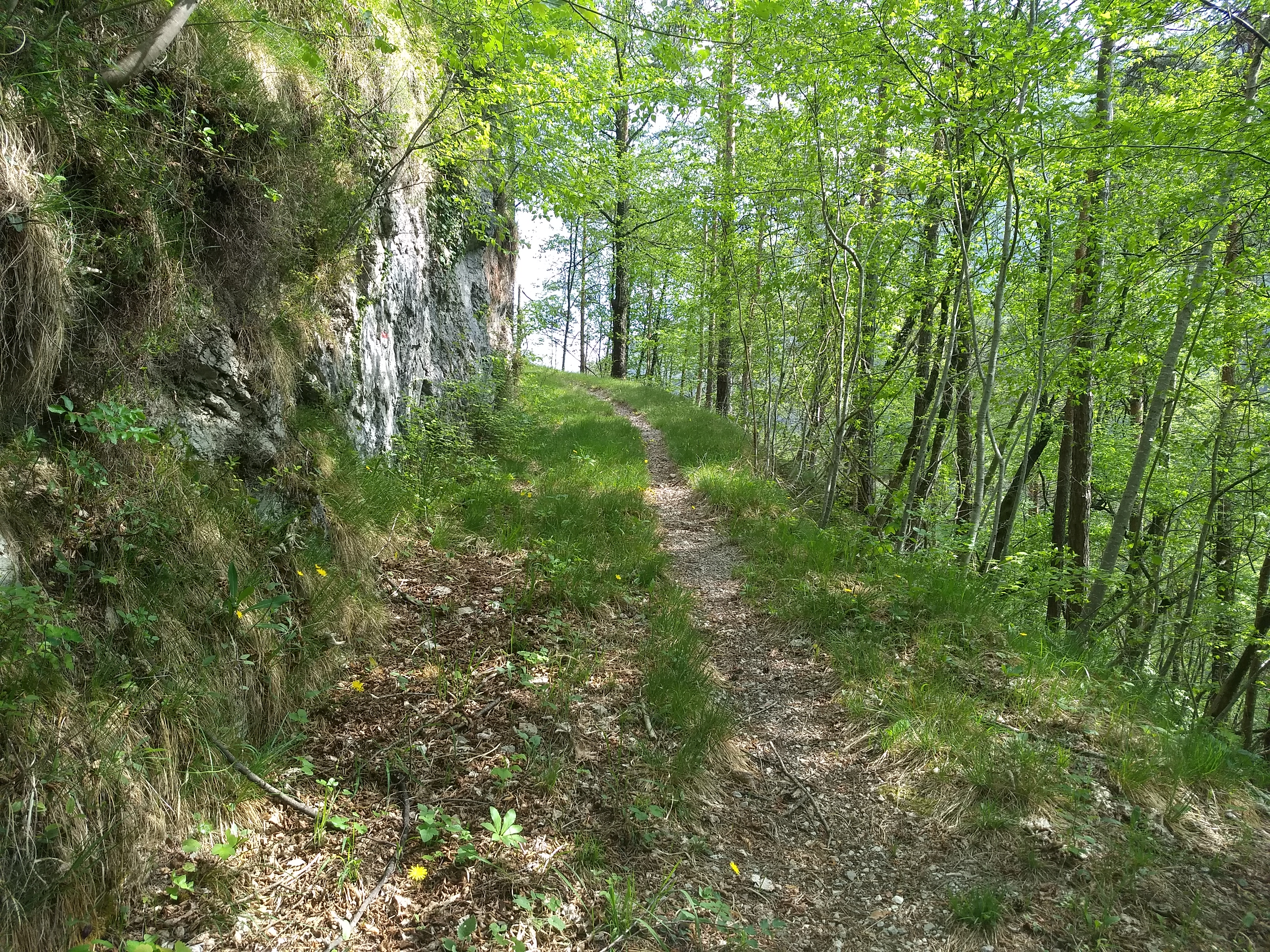
Mount Tavagnone, the forest path leading to the Martelletto and Droane locality, expanded by ERSAF Lombardy in the 1970s

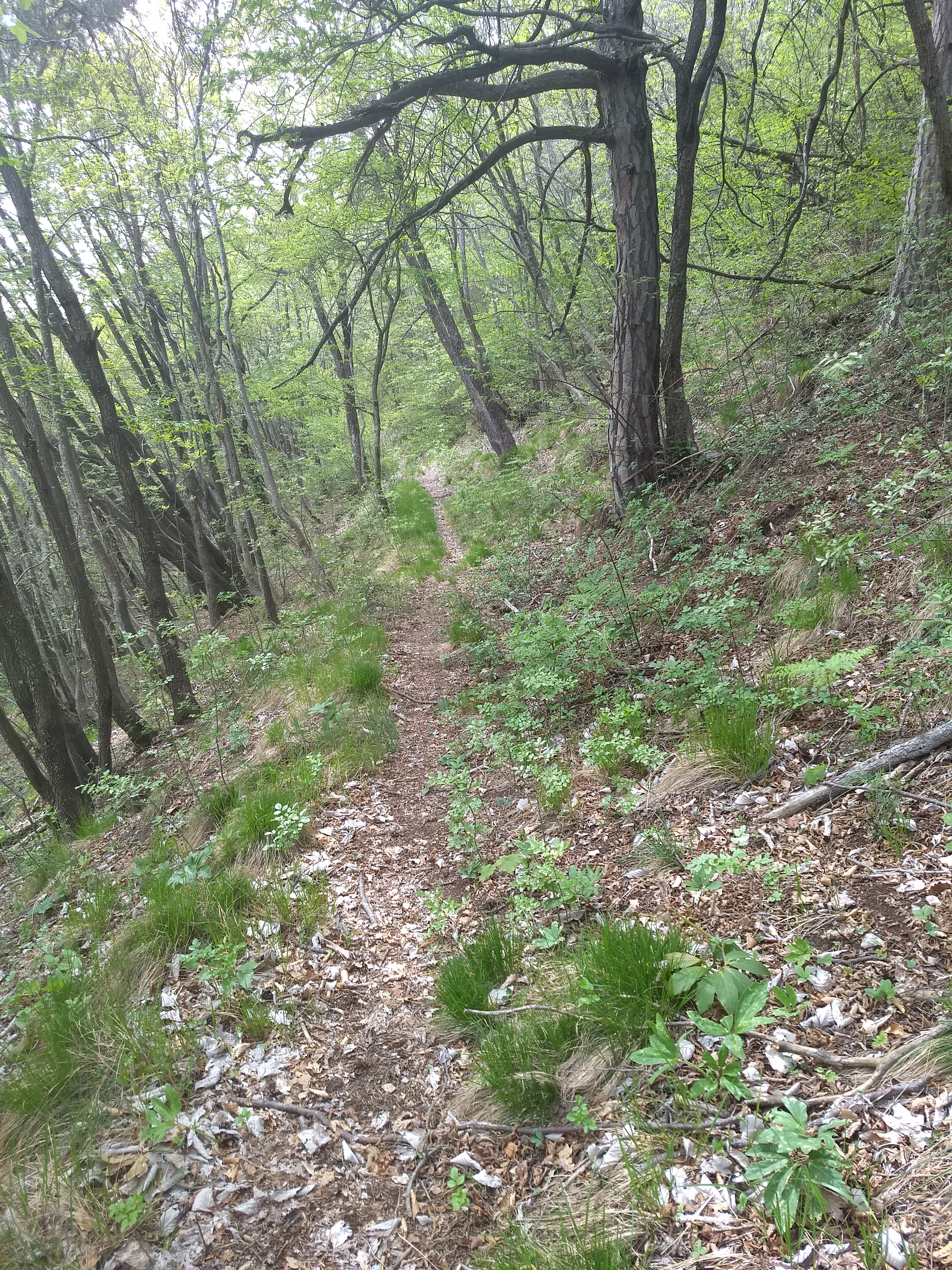
Mount Tavagnone, detail of the trail in the Droanello Valley

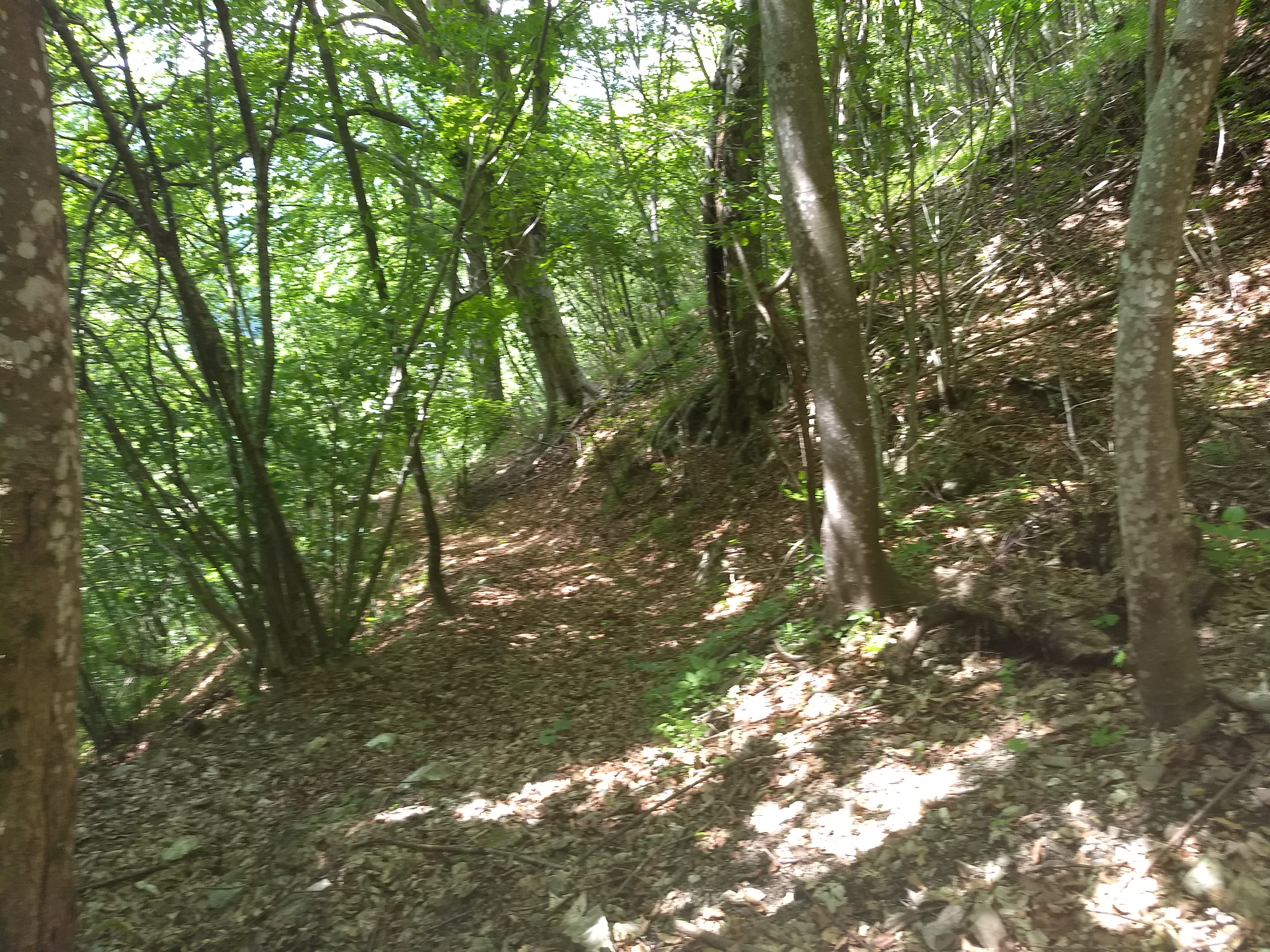
Mount Tavagnone, a glimpse of the mule track leading from the mount to the village of Fucina

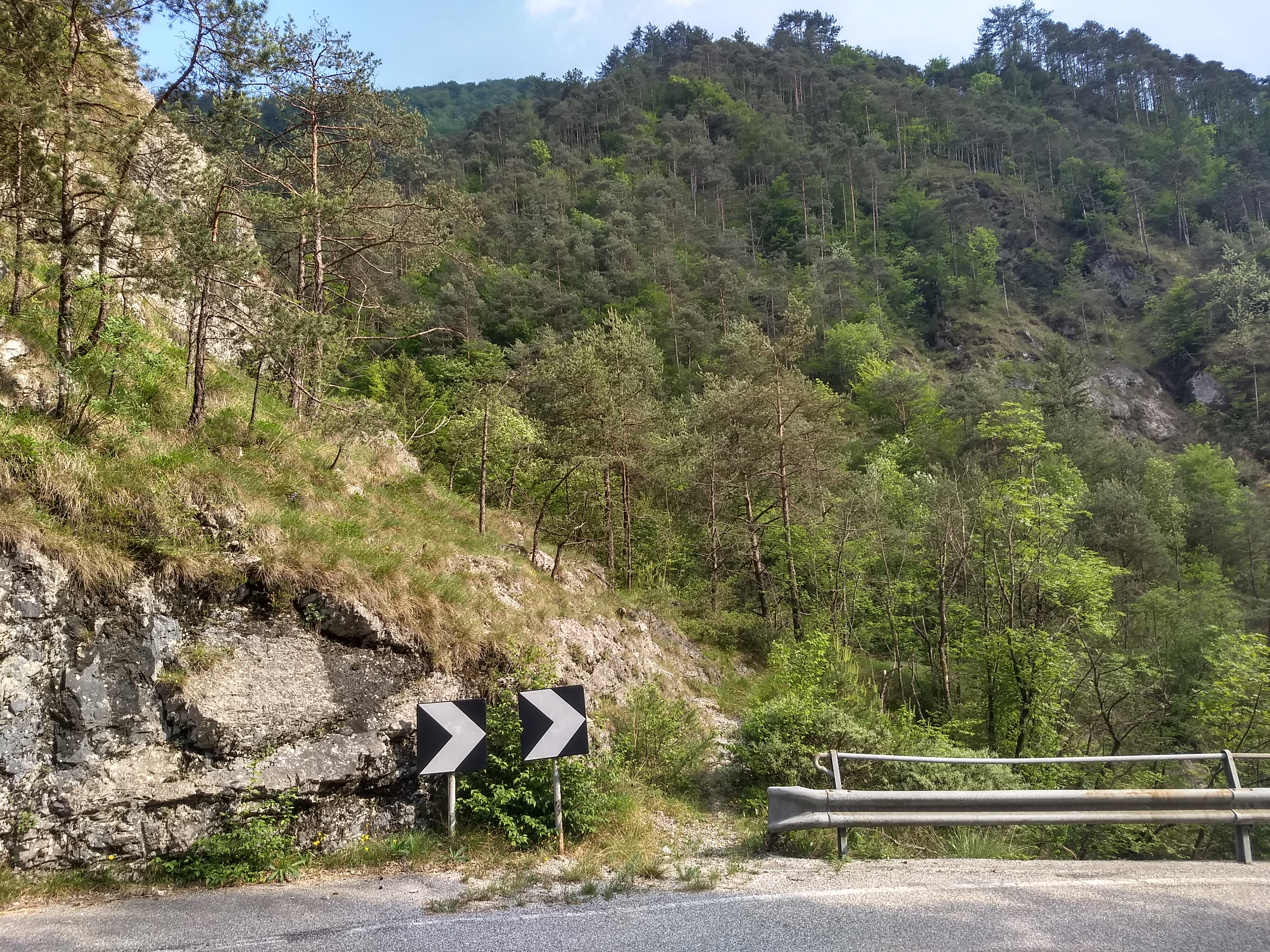
Mt. Tavagnone, Fucina locality on provincial road No. 9, beginning at the Nangone bridge of the trail that leads through the Sas Valley to the mount

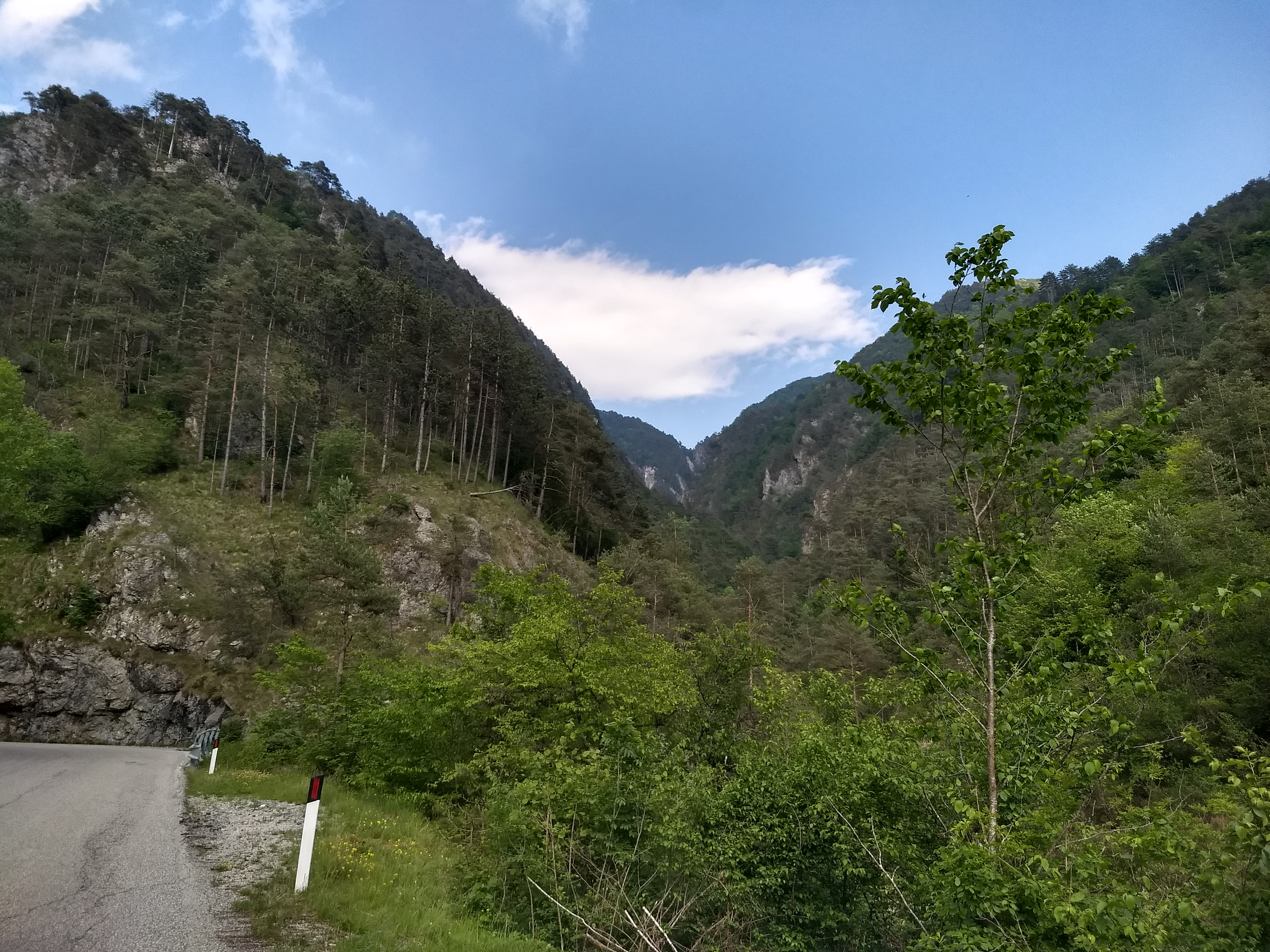
Mount Tavagnone, Sas Valley taken from the locality of Fucina to the Nangone Bridge on Provincial Road No. 9, in the background of the Valley the Fobbiola Pass that connects the trail from the locality of Apene of Mount Camiolo with the mountain

== See also ==
- Alto Garda Bresciano Regional Park
- Valvestino

== Bibliography ==
- Parchi e aree protette in Italia, 2003.
- Beppe e Giuseppina Bigazzi, 365 Giorni di Buona Tavola.
- Informatore botanico italiano, a cura della Società botanica italiana, 1998.
- Franz Hauleitner, Dolomiten- Höhenwege 8- 10, 2005.
- W. Kaul, Wandelgids Gardameer, 2001.
- L'Espresso, 2005.
- Lombardia: eccetto Milano e laghi, a cura del Touring club italiano, 1970.
- Luigi Vittorio Bertarelli, Le tre Venézie, 1925.
- Studi trentini di scienze naturali: Acta geologica, a cura del Museo tridentino di scienze naturali, 1982.
