= Monte Camiolo =

Mountain in Lombardy, Italy

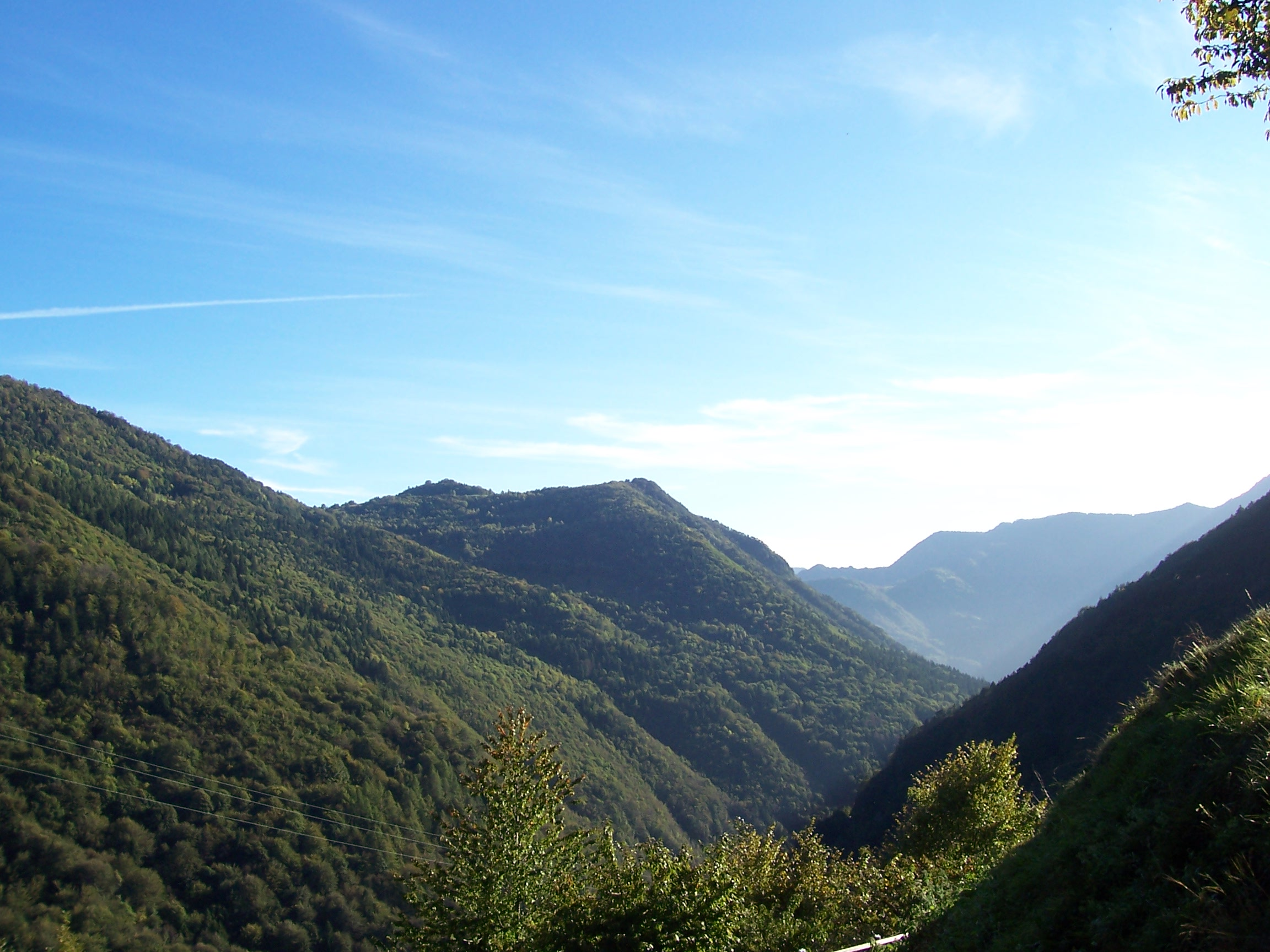
- Mount Camiolo and its summit, as seen from Magasa

Highest point
- Elevation: 1,235 m (4,052 ft)
- Coordinates: 45°45′20″N 10°36′59″E

Geography
- Location within Italy
- Location: Lombardy, Brescia, Italy
- Parent range: Brescia and Garda Prealps

Mount Camiolo (Camiöl in the local dialect) is a mountain in the Brescia and Garda Prealps belonging to the Tombea-Manos group whose peak Camiolo, also called Pesòc, reaches 1,235 m.a.s.l.

== Physical geography ==
Located in the municipal territory of Magasa and Valvestino, it is part of the Alto Garda Bresciano Park. The place has been, until recent decades after the abandonment of mountain agriculture by the last farmers, an area of mountain pasture and fodder cultivation, and also an area dedicated to cheese production.

=== Physical description ===
Among the local people of the Vestino Valley, the mountain of Camiolo is a rather large territory and denotes an articulated set of peaks, passes, paths, waterholes, agricultural lands, forests, and localities surrounding the mountain itself. Almost always, "Camiolo" refers not so much to the peak from which it does not actually take its name, called Pesòc, but rather refers to the area as a whole in the extensive meaning described. The mountain is characterized by vast wooded areas and grasslands with rural lands used in the past for growing fodder and raising livestock. Commonly it is divided by locals into three geographical zones: the summit, middle and basal zones, and the localities or rustic lands are usually derived from anthroponyms, that is, they take the name or nickname of the individuals or families who owned them.

The summit is called Camiolo di Cima and includes, starting from north to south, the locality of the Olva (Note: The place name is said to derive from the female name of the former owner.) property, the properties known as the Cioaröi and Bendoi estates, the ruins of the property known as the Fienile del Fö (beech tree), the Bocca Croce pass (1,061 m.), the Apene (Note: The place name is said to derive from the verbal misspelling of the word for nearby Mount Pine.) property, the Pine (Note: Mario Trebeschi, I conti di Lodrone e la divisione di monti e pascoli in Valvestino, in Memorie dell'Ateneo di Salò, vol. VI, year 1994, pp.85–121. In a parchment of 1511 the mountain was so called, and on its apex, on a large boulder, a cross was engraved, a sacred pact between the men of Turano and Magasa, which sanctioned the land division of the mountain. The toponym is said to derive from the Latin "pinetum," meaning pine forest, and would thus indicate a summit vegetated by this shrub, especially Scots pine, which was exploited for the extraction of plant resin and black pitch.) mountain with its 1,225 m, the Casì estate formerly owned by Legate Marzadri, Dosso Tondo, the Pesòc estate, Cima Camiolo, the summit of Mt. 1. 235 meters and the Prà Snidio property; the middle zone is called Camiolo di Mezzo, Mess in the local dialect, with the two Pir estates and the Fabbrica estate built in 1877 by Filippo Viani, while the lower part, Camiolo di Fondo with the wooded locality of Paüe in the northeastern part, the localities of fondo Fornaci, (Note: So named because in centuries past there were kilns for the production of clay tiles and various bricks.) fondo Massa dei Bernàrc, fondo Massa dei Boter, fondo Massa (Note: The toponym Massa of Latin origin but also adopted by the Lombards in the successions, would stand for the complex of several agricultural lands, managed by different families but owned by the Church or other authorities.) dei Mangane, the ruins of fondo Sebaghe, the ruins of fondo Vianì, the ruins of fondo Celi and fondo Mangana.

There is no presence throughout its territory of any water table, and in the past each cottage farm was used for food or for watering livestock from cisterns or rainwater pools. Supporting the past agricultural economy are the ruins of kilns devoted to the production of lime and roofing tiles and numerous charcoal farmyards, known as "giài."

The pass of Bocca alla Croce or Croce di Camiolo is a historical and legendary area of the Vestino Valley, located at an elevation of 1,061 m. It separates the main ridge of Mount Camiolo from the Droanello valley with that of the Magasino stream and can be reached by car, on a dirt road and with a transit permit, from the town of Magasa or Valvestino and there is a landing pad for a rescue helicopter. The toponym derives from the intersection of the four trails and the width of the pass that connect them to the north with Magasa, Mt. Mangà, Mt. Gosauer, to the south with Camiolo di Cima to the southeast with Droane, Tavagnone, and to the northeast with the Fornello-Cima Rest-Cadria. The history of the Vestino Valley made by merchants, peasants, horsemen, charcoal-burners and bandits of the 16th and 17th centuries, by the armies of the Venetian Republic in 1526, by Garibaldi's army in 1866 and by the Italian army in 1915 passed through here.

== Origin of the name ==
The origin of the name is completely unknown and may derive from the medieval name "Camiolus," a dialectal alteration of the medieval Latin word "cameolus," with the meaning of "cameo", indicating the owner of the mountain. The name was also in use especially among Slavic peoples, also as an altered form of the name "Camillus." The similarity with the surname is also yet to be proved, in fact, according to some, this would derive from the archaic dialect term "camiolo" meaning winemaker. Historically, the cultivation of vines on the slopes of the mountain is not documented although it was practiced with certainty, until the end of the 19th century, not far away, in Turano, in the locality of Ganone and in Ranch, in the municipality of Magasa.

The name of Mount Camiolo first appears in a parchment dated October 31, 1511 when representatives of the communities of the Vestino Valley proceeded to its land partition under the auspices of Count Bartolomeo Lodron. The mountain is also mentioned in the municipal statutes of Magasa of 1589 in an article that provided for the prohibition of anyone to cut wood in the surroundings of the said mountain and in a report of the Venetian superintendent of Salò of 1613 regarding the road system near the borders of the Serenissima.

In the "Atlas Tyrolensis" by cartographer Peter Anich, printed in Vienna in 1774, it is referred to as Camiol along with the nearby Mount Tavagnone and Mount Pinedo, while Arnaldo Gnagna in his "Vocabolario topografico-toponomastico della provincia di Brescia," published in 1939, reports on page 124, the peak with the plural term of Camiole and the mountainside to the north as Camiola.

The Camiolo peak also known locally as Pesòc is a term that seems to derive, as with nearby Mount Pizzocolo, from the Germanic word "spitz" meaning pointy, pointed, and from the Celtic word "higel" meaning an elevation or hill, so the final meaning would be to indicate a mountain with a pointed top, as it actually is.

== History ==
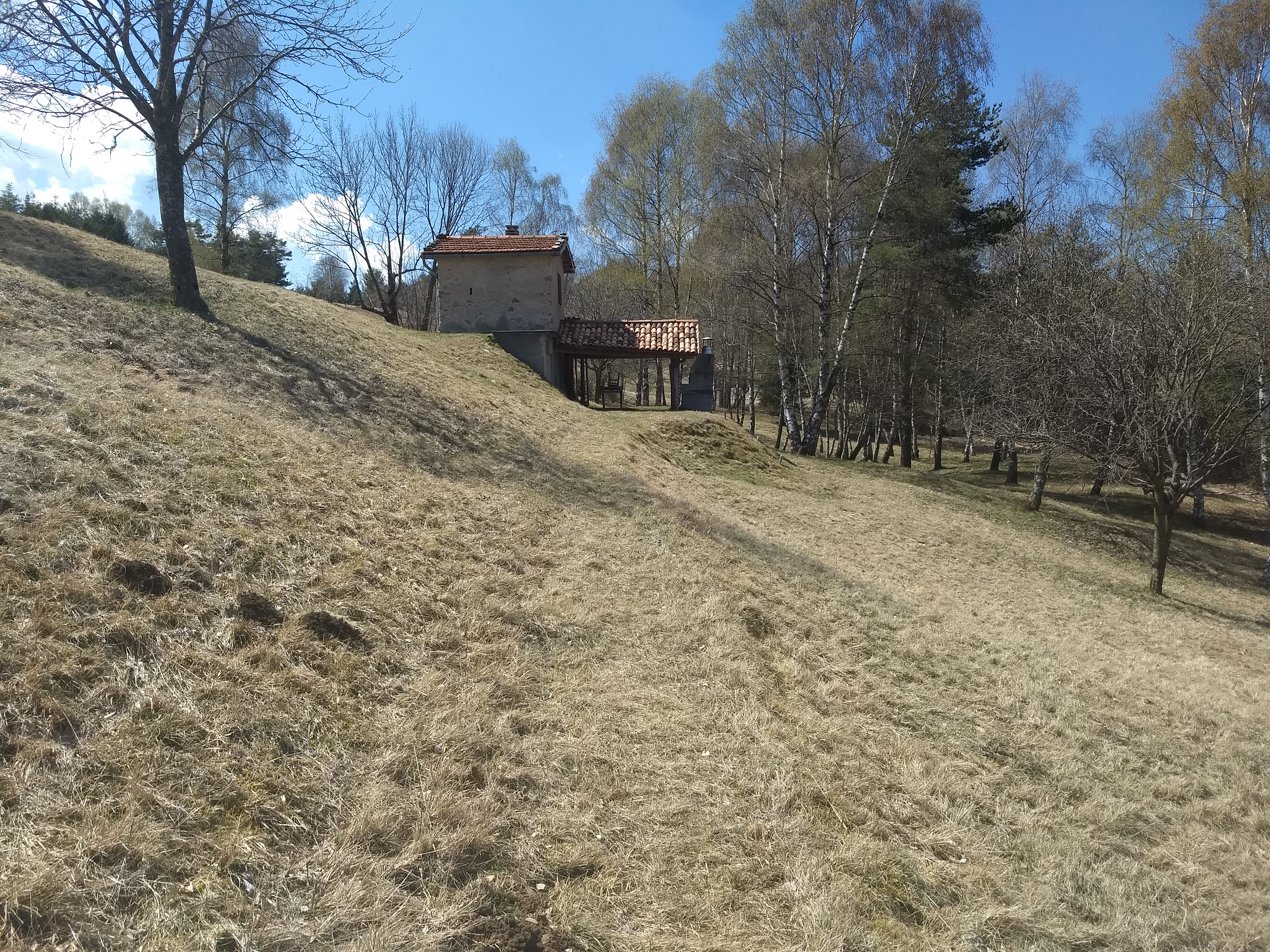
Casì locality at Mount Camiolo di Cima. The agricultural land was owned by the Marzadri family of Turano and was later established for the needs of the most disadvantaged, including the provision of a bird snare. It is legitimately assumed that ownership of the land had belonged in 1600, through a maternal inheritance, to the family of Eliseo Baruffaldi, a bandit from Turano.

In the past centuries, especially between 1426 and 1796, given its strategic position on the edge of the state border between the Republic of Venice and the Prince-Bishopric of Trent, the area of Mount Camiolo elicited in the Venetian superintendents of Salò a nagging concern about any possible enemy movement that could threaten the Salò Riviera through the passes or paths from the Vestino Valley. Thus the name of the mountain is mentioned in the report that superintendent Melchior Zane, dated June 3, 1621, secretly sent to the Venetian Senate where he stated: "[...] The second pass that enters the municipality of Gargnano is that of Cocca di Pavolon with two roads. One comes from Cadria, a place of the Vestino Valley, passing through the mountain of Risech of the commune of Tignale, with horses and pedestrians, and the other from Camiolo, a place of the said Valley, which goes up the mountain of Pinedo (Note: The mountain is located to the south at the entrance to the Droanello valley and is shown on Peter Anich's 1774 "Atlas Tyrolensis" map, and in essence would consist of the vast northern slope, enclosed between Mount Pra-Lignago and Bocchetta della Cocca, which descends into the Droanello stream in the hamlet of Costa in the municipality of Gargnano. The toponym Pinedo, certainly of Venetian origin, would derive from the Scots pine plant and thus indicate a pine forest, where plant resining and the extraction of black pitch was practiced.) of the commune of Gargnano and goes into the river of Droane, coming even from the Cocca of Pavolon."

Among the various owners of farmland were the Marzadri family and that of the notorious bandit Eliseo Baruffaldi of Turano. Numerous furnaces were in operation, among them the one activated in 1860 by Carlo Mora of Val di Ledro. In July 1866 during the Third War of Independence it was traversed by a column of Garibaldini from the 2nd Reggimento Volontari Italiani coming from Droane and heading for Magasa, and the same thing happened in June 1915 with infantrymen of the Royal Italian Army.

It has been repeatedly affected along with Mt. Tavagnone and the Droanello valley by devastating forest fires on the southeastern slope, which have impaired its spontaneous forestation of Scots pines, most recently the one of June 28 and 29, 2021.

=== 1511: the great division of pastures and forests of the Camiolo, Tombea, Dos di Sas mountains and the coast of Ve ===
The study carried out by Don Mario Trebeschi, former parish priest of Limone del Garda, of a crumpled and in places illegible parchment preserved in the Parish Archive of Magasa, brought to light the intensive exploitation of alpine pastures, forests, and torrential waters in the Vestino Valley that was often the cause of interminable and bitter quarrels among the six communities, especially in the disputed areas of the Tombea and Camiolo mountains; each of them claimed, more or less strongly, ancient rights of possession or transit, with the result that normal and proper use was compromised by constant trespassing by herds and illegal logging. Therefore in the early 16th century, to avoid worse trouble, it came in two successive stages with the authoritative arbitration of the Lodron counts to a partition of these places among the various villas or "communelli." In fact, these played an active role in the affair, energetically persuading the communities to the final resolution of the problem by signing an agreement that was as balanced as possible, so much so as to completely and definitively satisfy the exacting demands of the many parties involved.

On July 5, 1502, the notary Delaido Cadenelli of Valle di Scalve drew up in Turano under the kitchen porch of the house of a certain Giovanni, a settlement deed between Armo and Magasa for the consensual exploitation of the neighboring Cablone valley (in the document Camlone, located below Mount Cortina). Present were the deputies for Armo: Bartolomeo, son of Faustino, and Stefenello, son of Lorenzo; for Magasa: Antoniolo, son of Giovanni Zeni, and Viano, son of Giovanni Bertolina. Serving as appellate judges were Counts Francesco, Bernardino, and Paride, sons of the aforementioned Giorgio, who went down in the history of local chronicles of the time as men endowed with bloody ferocity.

On October 31, 1511, in the rectory of the church of St. John the Baptist in Turano, Bartolomeo, son of the late Stefanino Bertanini of Villavetro, a public notary by imperial authority, stipulated the document of the largest land division ever in the Valley, more than a third of its territory was affected. An initial agreement had already been stipulated on September 5, 1509 by the notary Girolamo Morani on records of the notary Giovan Pietro Samuelli of Liano, but following the intervention of some variations it was preferred, at the invitation of Counts Bernardino and Paride, to completely revise everything and thus proceed to a new partition. In the presence of Count Bartolomeo, son of the late Bernardino, the parish priest Bernardino, son of the late Tommaso Bertolini, Francesco, son of Bernardino Piccini, both from Gargnano, the Bergamasque Bettino, son of the late Luca de Medici from San Pellegrino, were gathered as witnesses, three proxies for each municipality, with the exception of Bollone, which was not part of the dispute (for Magasa were present Zeno, son of the late Giovanni Zeni, Pietro Andrei, and Viano Bertolini), and the division of the property due to each individual village was solemnly carried out. Magasa was given the ownership of Mount Tombea up to the meadows of Fondo including the area pertaining to the Alvezza pasture and the exclusive right to all transit rights; a part of wooded territory on the Cima Gusaur and on the Apene hump in Camiolo, in compensation it paid 400 lire to the other communities as recompense for the damages suffered for the deprivation of the aforementioned mountain passages.

Some clauses expressly stipulated that the Nangone bridge (Vangone or Nangù in the local dialect) was to be in common use and that along the Toscolano stream bed cattle could be freely grazed and its water used to feed the hydraulic mechanisms of the factories. In contrast, grazing and illegal cutting of plants was severely punished with a fine of 10 coins for each offense committed. In the end, after rereading the specifications, all the contractors declared that they had full knowledge of the parts of property they had in their possession, that they acknowledged that the division implemented was impartial, and that they respectfully observed the statutes, orders, provisions and decrees of Count Lodron, lords of the Lodrone community and those of Val Vestino. Then the representatives of Armo, Magasa, Moerna, Persone and Turano swore before Count Bartholomew Lodron, touching the holy gospels, that they would not counterfeit and contravene the present land division and, by their act, submitted themselves to the judgment of the ecclesiastical forum and the sacred canons of Chalcedon.

=== The early days of the Great War. The advance of the Italian bersaglieri ===
Cima Gusaur and Cima Manga in Val Vestino had been part of the Austro-Hungarian Empire since the beginning of the Great War and were captured by Italian bersaglieri of the 7th Regiment on the first day of the conflict, May 24, 1915, in the rain. In anticipation of the Kingdom of Italy's entry into the war against the Austro-Hungarian Empire, the Regiment was mobilized on the western Upper Garda, framed in the 6th Infantry Division of the III Army Corps and was composed of the 8th, 10th and 11th bis Battalions with orders to reach in hostile territory the first line Cima Gusaner (Cima Gusaur)-Cadria and then the Bocca di Cablone-Cima Tombea-Monte Caplone line to the north.

On May 20, the Regiment's three Battalions reached Liano and Costa di Gargnano, Gardola in Tignale and Passo Puria in Tremosine awaiting the order to advance to Val Vestino. On May 24, the bersaglieri advanced from Droane toward Bocca alla Croce on Mount Camiolo, Cima Gusaur and the village of Cadria, arranging themselves on the line from Mount Puria to Dosso da Crus via Mount Caplone, Bocca alla Croce and Cima Gusaur. On the same May 24, from Cadria, the commander, Colonel Gianni Metello, (Note: Colonel Gianni Metello commanded the Regiment from May 24 to July 30, 1915. Promoted to the rank of general in 1916, he was placed in command of the "Udine" Infantry Brigade; in April 1917 he was placed on temporary leave for six months in Naples due to infirmity not caused by service; he later assumed command of the "Jonio" Territorial Brigade. Metello was a native of Montecatini Terme, born in 1861. He participated in all campaigns from Adua to East Africa. Decorated with a silver medal for military valor and a bronze medal for military valor. He was among the founders of the National Bersaglieri Association in the province of Pistoia in 1928 and as first president founded the Bersaglieri section of Montecatini Terme in 1934, becoming its honorary president until his death in East Africa in 1937.) reported to the Giudicarie Subsector Command that there was no trace, nor was it known, of any work being done in the valley by the enemy, whose troops had retreated to tactical positions beyond Val di Ledro. He highlighted that there was starvation in the area, devoid of resources, with only old men, women and children. The following day they reached Mount Caplone and Mount Tombea without encountering resistance. Lorenzo Gigli, a journalist and special envoy following the advance of the Royal Italian Army wrote: "The advance took place very peacefully on the Giudicarie road; and equal success had the occupation of the area between Garda and Lake Idro (Vestino valley) where the villages of Moerna, Magasa, Turano and Bolone were conquered without a fight. The populations greeted the liberators very festively; the old men, women and children (for able-bodied men can no longer be found) came out to meet them with great joy: The Italian soldiers! The Austrians, before they left, had described them as hordes eager for revenge. And lo and behold, they came without firing a shot...At Magasa, a small town in the Vestino valley, our people entered without resistance. They found, however, all the houses closed. The only person from the village that could be seen was an old woman. They asked her, "Are you glad the Italians came?" The old woman hesitated and then answered in a voice veiled with fear, "What if those ones come back?" "Those," of course, are the Austrians. They will never come back. But they have left such a memory in these unfortunate survivors that they still dare not believe liberation is possible and refrain from openly expressing their joy for fear of possible reprisals. The work of the Trentino clergy helped to create and increase this inordinate fear. With rare exceptions (most notably that of the prince-bishop of Trent, who was imprisoned by the Austrians), the priests of Trent are the most steadfast propagandists of Austria. One officer told me, "As soon as we enter a conquered country, the first person we capture is the priest. Many have been taken so far. It's a kind of preventive measure....". On May 27 they occupied further north Cima Spessa and Dosso dell'Orso, from where they could control the Val d'Ampola, and on June 2 Costone Santa Croce, Casetta Zecchini on Mount Calva, Mount Tremalzo and Bocchetta di Val Marza. On June 15 they deployed between Santa Croce, Casetta Zecchini, Corno Marogna and Passo Gattum; on July 1 between Malga Tremalzo, Corno Marogna, Bocchetta di Val Marza, Corno spesso, Malga Alta Val Schinchea and Costone Santa Croce. On Oct. 22 the 10th Battalion entered Bezzecca, Pieve di Ledro and Locca, while the 11th bis deployed on Mount Tremalzo. In 1916 were the last days of the Bersaglieri presence on the front of the Ledro Valley: between November 7 and 9 the battalions withdrew to Storo and from there to Vobarno and then continued by train to Cervignano del Friuli and their new destinations.

=== The practice of hunting ===
Of the earliest information on the practice of hunting in the Valley there is a writing from as far back as 1840 by the geographer Attilio Zuccagni-Orlandini, who wrote about the local economy: "Just as the inhabitants of Val di Ledro, those of Val Vestina profit from the hunting of birds, many taking many of them and then sending them to be sold as far as Brescia, so these of Val Vestina find in hunting profit and pastime." Mount Camiolo was always among the favorite hunting grounds of the Bettoni counts, a noble family originally from Gargnano. In fact, Count Ludovico Bettoni Cazzago, a native of Brescia who lived during the 19th century, a politician and senator of the Kingdom, is reported in the family chronicles to have preferred wandering hunting for woodcocks, hares, and grouse in the Vestino Valley or in the mountains of Tremosine, where he went with large packs of dogs, in the company of his peasants and many friends, including Agostino Conter.

Later, in 1896, he wrote from Rasone di Gargnano in a hunting magazine about the paucity of game numbers and the illegal means practiced to hunt them, including in the mountains of the Vestino Valley. The signature of the article is anonymous, but since the place was the mountain residence of the Bettoni counts, perhaps the columnist belonged to that noble family and it can be assumed that he was Count Ludovico Bettoni himself: "Rasone di Gargnano, October 11. Today we have unseasonable weather, water, wind and fog. Of finches and other birds in general there has been a slaughter of them in the past few days, but of woodcocks here we have not had the fortune of seeing one until now. The displeasure is soothed, however, by a few partridges and hares, but at best it is bad hunting. I did not mention my trip to the Vestino Valley, because I was almost disillusioned, although I was luckier than many others. From the findings I must conclude that if not provided for in time, the stationary game will soon disappear because of the many illegal means that are used for its wildfowling. From the reports I read I can safely assume that even hunters in the plains get meagre results from their hunting excursions, so it can be repeated that: "If Messena cries, Sparta does not laugh. Miss." He added regarding the phenomenon of poaching: "Mountain hunting practiced in the territories of Tignale, Tremosine, Cadria, Val Vestino, Bagolino, in Valsesia and in part of the upper Camonica Valley, with the exception of the queen of the woods, has left gratifying memories, for the fact that partridges, rock partridges, rock ptarmigans, western capercaillies and hares have been satisfactorily hunted, in spite of the increasing poaching, which, in order not to be repressed, is increasing in audacity every day."

In 1940, the Prefect of Trent considered the advisability of ordering until further notice a complete ban on hunting and birding in the territory of the province of Brescia constituting the Valvestino hunting reserve, "the concession of which was arranged by decree of the Prefect of Trent dated August 19, 1931-IX, No. 23881/TII B, decreed pursuant to Article 23 of the aforementioned Testo Unico is hereby ordered, until further notice, the absolute prohibition of hunting and bird trapping in the Valvestino hunting reserve, the concession for which was ordered by decree of the Prefect of Trent dated 19 a posta 11-1X, no. 3881/111 B. The Brescia Provincial Hunting Committee is charged with the execution of this decree. This decree will be published in the Official Gazette of the Kingdom. Rome, ddl December 22, 1940-XIX. Minister Tassinari."

== Places of interest ==
=== The watering hole ===
The puddle present on the southwestern slope of the Mount beyond the Corsetti property, known as the "lavàc," plays a fundamental role in maintaining the grazing activity of wild livestock, but also in protecting the biodiversity of habitats and species, especially amphibians, which through these pools of water can find an ideal place for their reproduction. Local tradition reports that, given the lack of springs and streams in the area, the puddle had existed for centuries and the technique for making it consisted of manual excavation in the impluvial area of the mountain slope to facilitate subsequent filling with the natural collection of rainwater, percolation or snowmelt. The main problem encountered by the farmers was the waterproofing of the bottom: often the simple trampling of the livestock, with consequences compaction of the soil, was not sufficient to ensure water tightness due to the low clay content of the soil present, so it was necessary to distribute on the bottom a layer of good clay soil found in the immediate vicinity. However, as this was not possible due to the diversity of the soil, a thick layer of soil and beech foliage was compacted on the bottom, which could form an effective felt to retain water. To ensure a sufficient supply of water needed to fill the puddle, or to increase it, it was often necessary to make small surface channels, dug along the adjacent slope to intercept even a modest amount. Periodic maintenance, usually on an annual basis, consisted mainly of removing soil that had slipped inside due to the continuous trampling of watering livestock and the percolation of wildlife. Clearing of aquatic vegetation was also done to maintain the functionality of the puddle by preventing it from overgrowing inside by accelerating its natural silting process. Particular care was taken during these stages as there was a risk of breaking the continuity of the impermeable layer and compromising its functionality; for example, it was preferred not to remove any boulders on the bottom. The puddle, which had fallen into disuse for decades, was remodeled by ERSAF Lombardy in 2004–2007 with the "Life Nature project biocoenosis rehabilitation in Valvestino and Corno della Marogna". It was designed to allow livestock and wildlife to access it again even down to the bottom of the pond when water is scarce. In the past, almost every private agricultural property had a waterhole, while the municipality of Magasa built its own to serve the funds in its territory in the area north of the mountain near the trail access. It traditionally took the name "lavàc de Comù," which means for public use, or "lavàc dei Ghenghèr" or "dei Campane," from the nickname of the farming families who used it. Even today, the remains of the excavations of eight waterholes can still be found on the mountain.

== Culture ==
=== Legends ===
A legend says that between 1496 and 1537, a plague epidemic exterminated 150 people from the village of Droane sparing only two old women who took refuge in Tignale, and the plague was so terrible that by placing a loaf of bread on the ridge of the Bocca, the one facing the Droanello valley immediately blackened while the one on the side of the Vestino valley remained white.

== Nature ==
The area of the mountain, given its scientific importance, was herborized from the mid-19th century, and in these places, in 1842, the Trento botanist Francesco Facchini collected specimens of yellow thistle and plantago lanceolata, in successive expeditions in 1846 and 1847, and at Mount Denai. In later years the priest and botanist Don Pietro Porta of Moerna, an expert in cataloging "cirsium," herborized there.

No less impressive are its natural resources consisting of forests and meadows covering all slopes and ungulate wildlife. The vast forests of resinous plants in past centuries had great importance in the economy of Vestino Valley. In fact, the Scotch pine and fir trees were exploited, in the period between spring and late summer, for the extraction from the stumps, of pitch and turpentine, a plant resin, from the stems, which when solidified is called white pitch. Refined locally at the furnaces in the Fornello locality, it was traded profitably with the Republic of Venice as Greek pitch, being employed for various uses, but especially in its naval dockyards for caulking the ships and on their fixed and running (or flying) rigging, taking advantage of its watertightness.

=== The practice of charcoal-burning ===
There are numerous ancient charcoal kilns on the mountain, symbolic of a profession that disappeared decades ago. The charcoal pile, pojat in the local dialect, was a technique widely used in the past in much of the Alpine, subalpine and Apennine territory to transform wood, preferably beech, but also fir, hornbeam, larch, ash, chestnut, turkey oak, pine and mountain pine, into charcoal. Valvestines were considered expert charcoal burners, carbonèr as they were called, as also reflected in the writings of Cesare Battisti. The earliest records of this profession date back to the 17th century, when men from Val Vestino applied to the authorities of the Serenissima for health permits to travel to Florence and Venice. They practiced their work not only in Italy but also in the territories of the former Austro-Hungarian Empire, especially in Bosnia-Herzegovina, and in the late 19th-century United States of America in Syracuse-Solvay.

Although this technique has undergone minor changes over the centuries, the charcoal kiln has always maintained a conical mound shape, formed by a central chimney and other side vent shafts, used for the purpose of regulating air draft. The charcoal production process takes advantage of imperfect wood combustion, which occurs under conditions of low oxygenation for 13 or 14 days.

These small barnyards, locally called ajal, jal or gial, were scattered in the woods at fairly regular distances and connected by dense networks of paths. They had to be located far from draughts and consisted of sandy, permeable soil. Very often, given the steep terrain of the woods, they were supported by dry stone walls, and nearby the charcoal burner would build a wooden hut to shelter himself and his family. Small pieces of charred wood can still be found in these pitches today. They were carefully cleaned during the preparation of the wood.

When the firing was completed, the decarbonization stage would begin, which required 1–2 days of work. First the coal had to be cooled with numerous shovelfuls of earth. It was then extracted by extinguishing any embers left burning with water. The quality of the coal obtained varied depending on the skill and experience of the charcoal burner, but also on the wood used. The best quality coal had to "sing well," that is, make a good noise. Finally the coal, when it was well cooled, was bagged and transported by the muleteers to the Garda Riviera to be sold to buyers. Both domestic and industrial use was made of this coal, and the practice fell into disuse in the Valley shortly after World War II supplanted by the use of electricity, diesel fuel and its derivatives.

== Image gallery ==
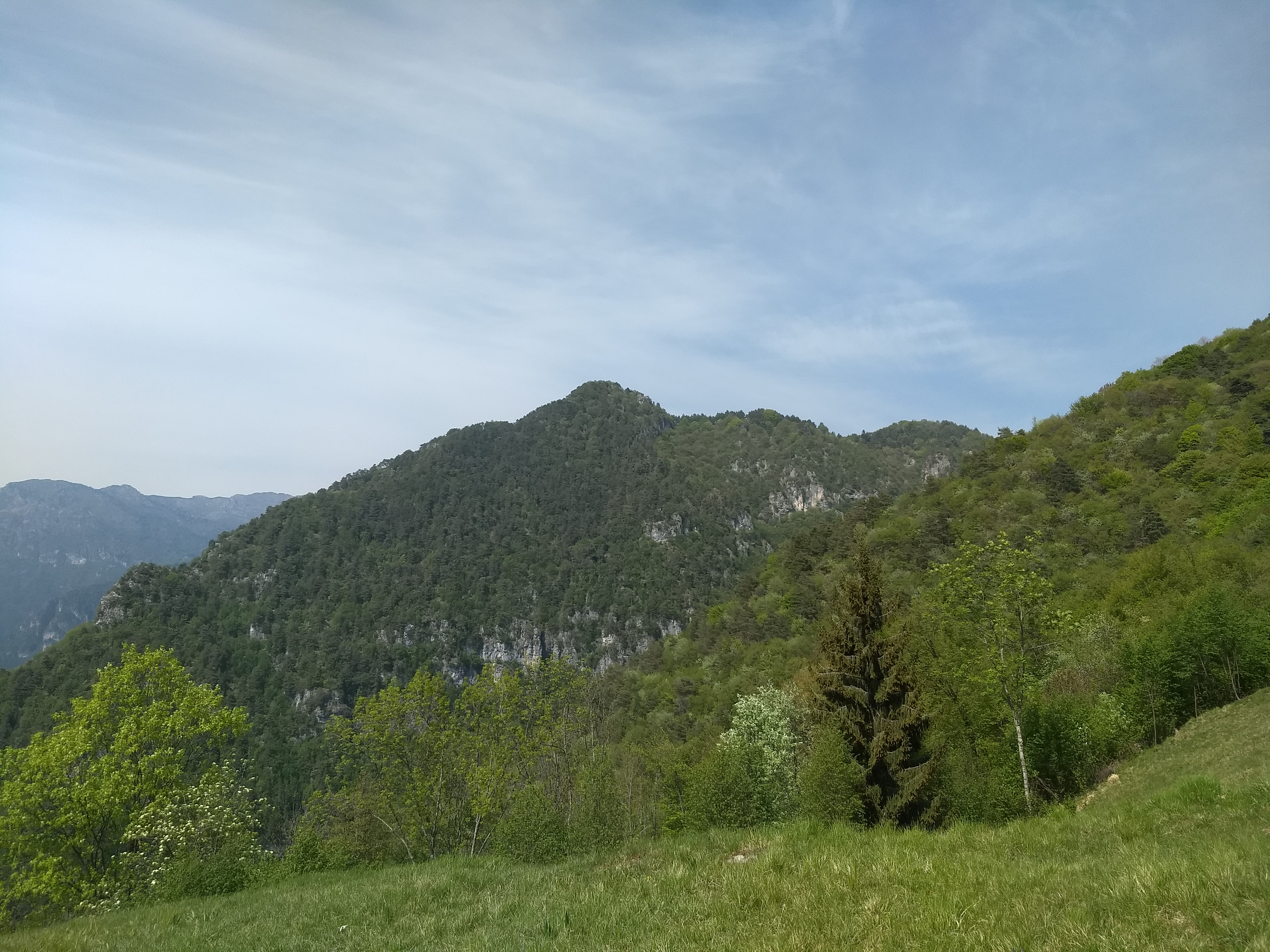
Mount Tavagnone, Cima Camiolo or Pesòc

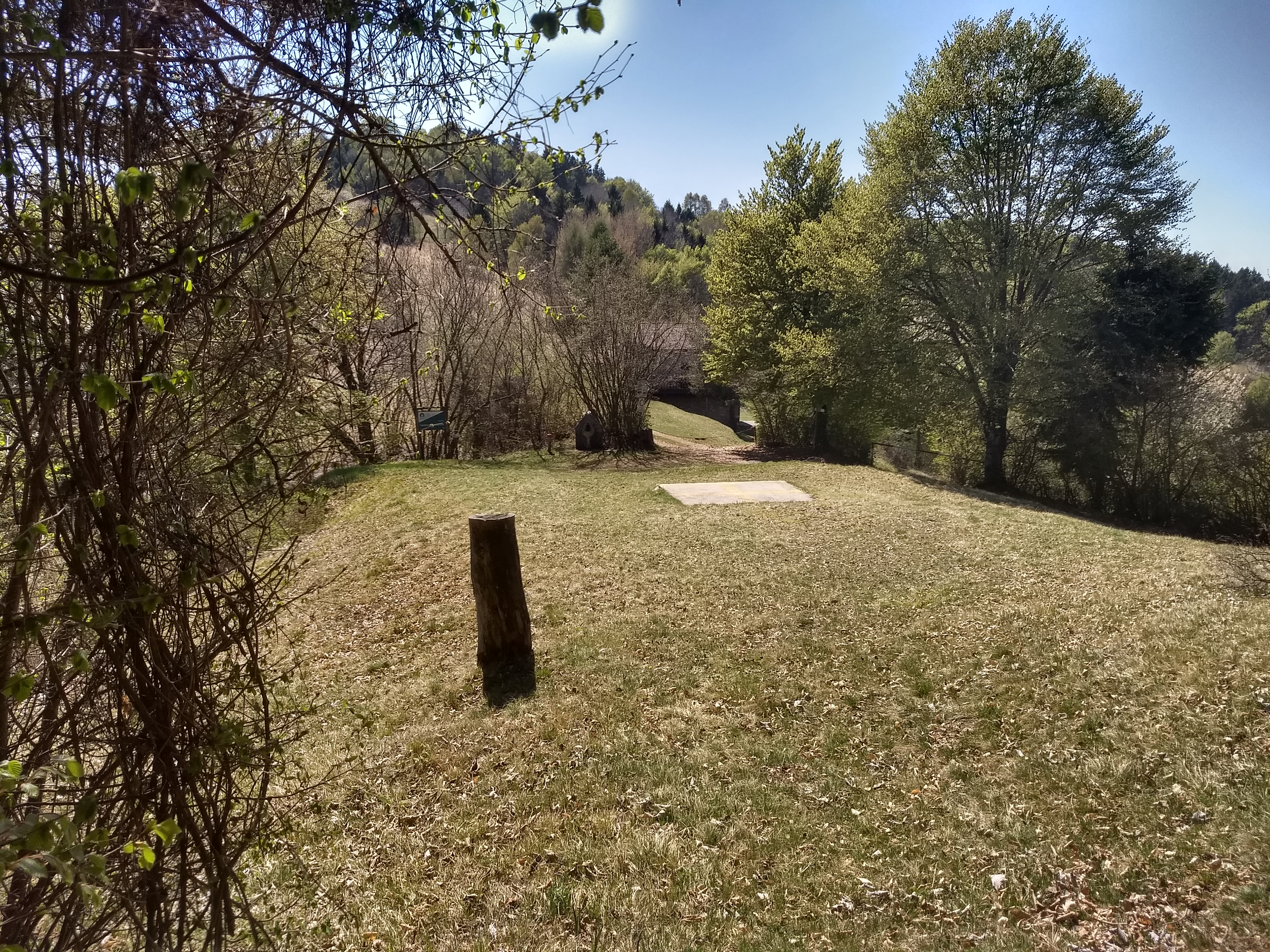
Mount Camiolo di Cima, Bocca alla Croce or Camiolo Cross

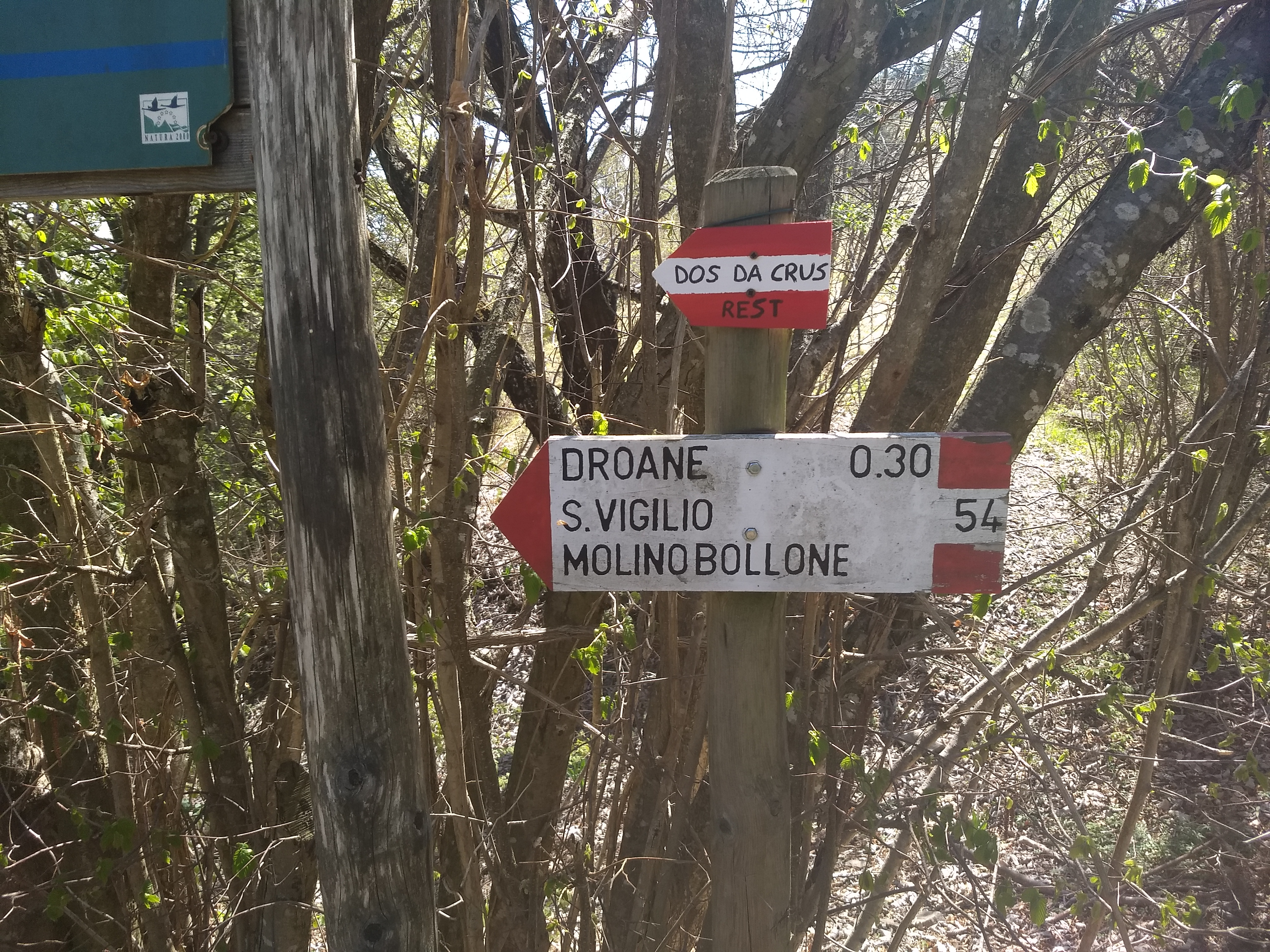
Mount Camiolo di Cima, signs at the Bocca alla Croce

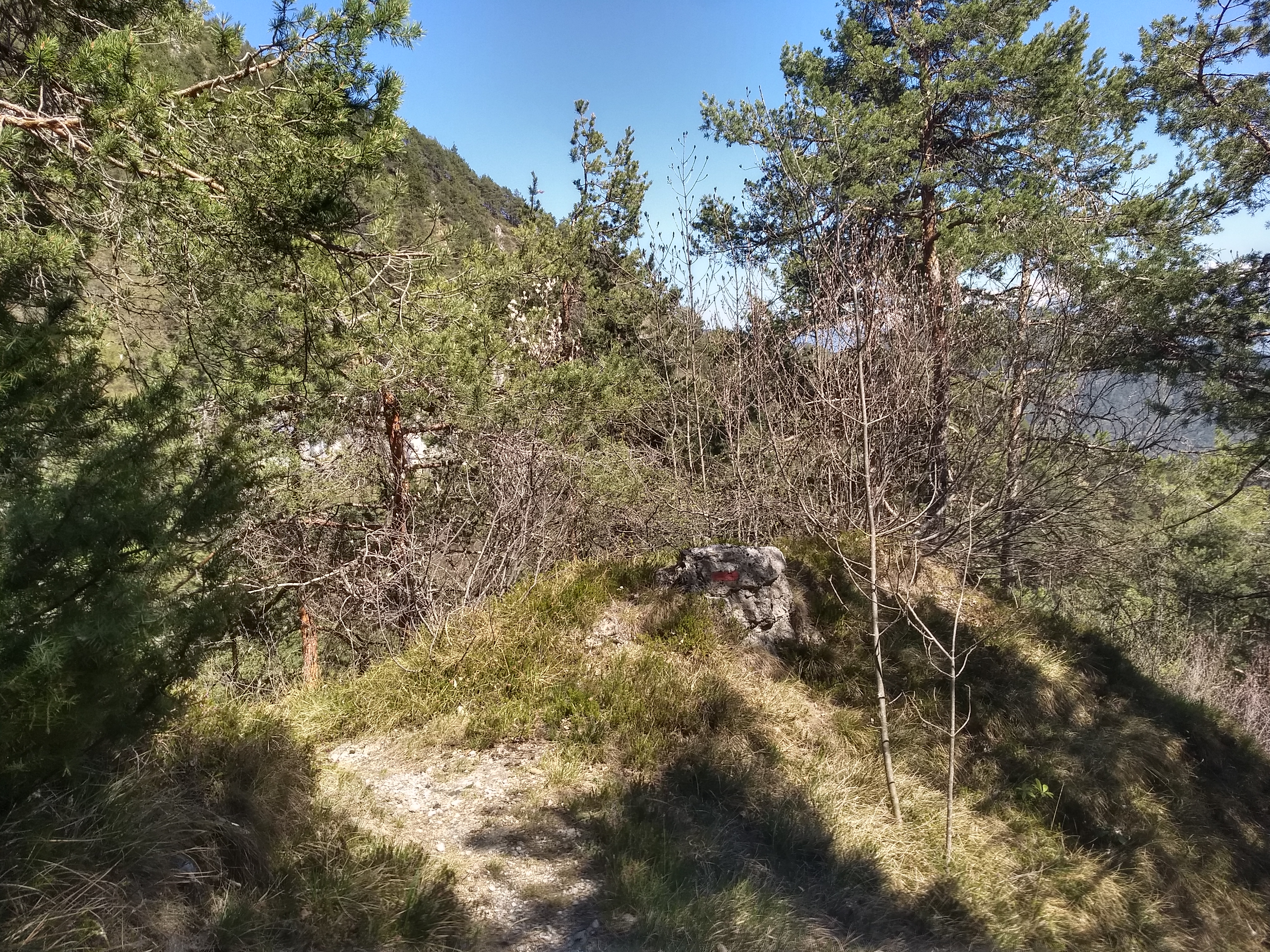
Mount Camiolo di Cima, Trail of Costa delle Ombrie

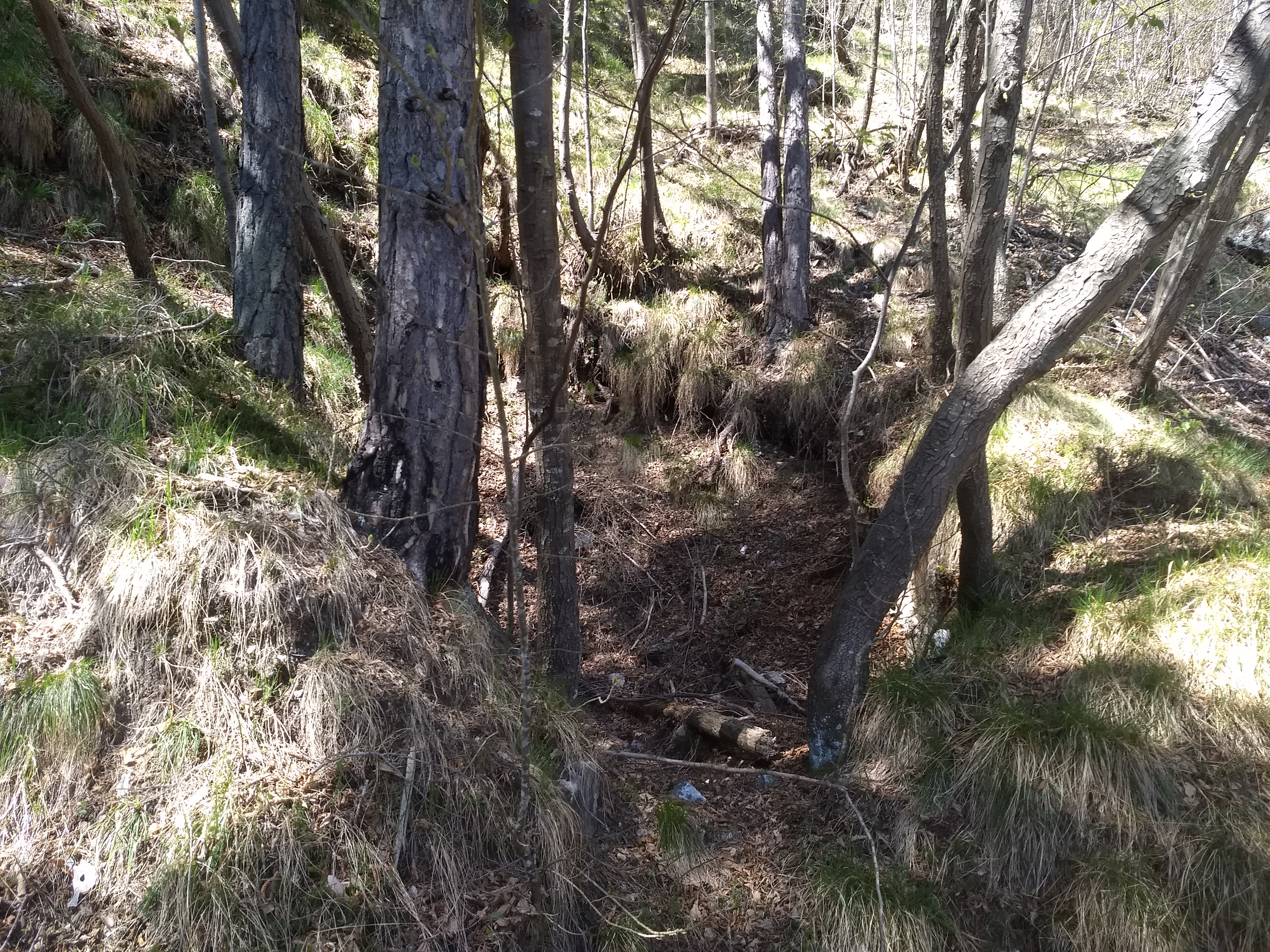
Mount Camiolo di Cima, Costa delle Ombrie trail, ruins of a lime kiln at the junction of the trail down to Droane

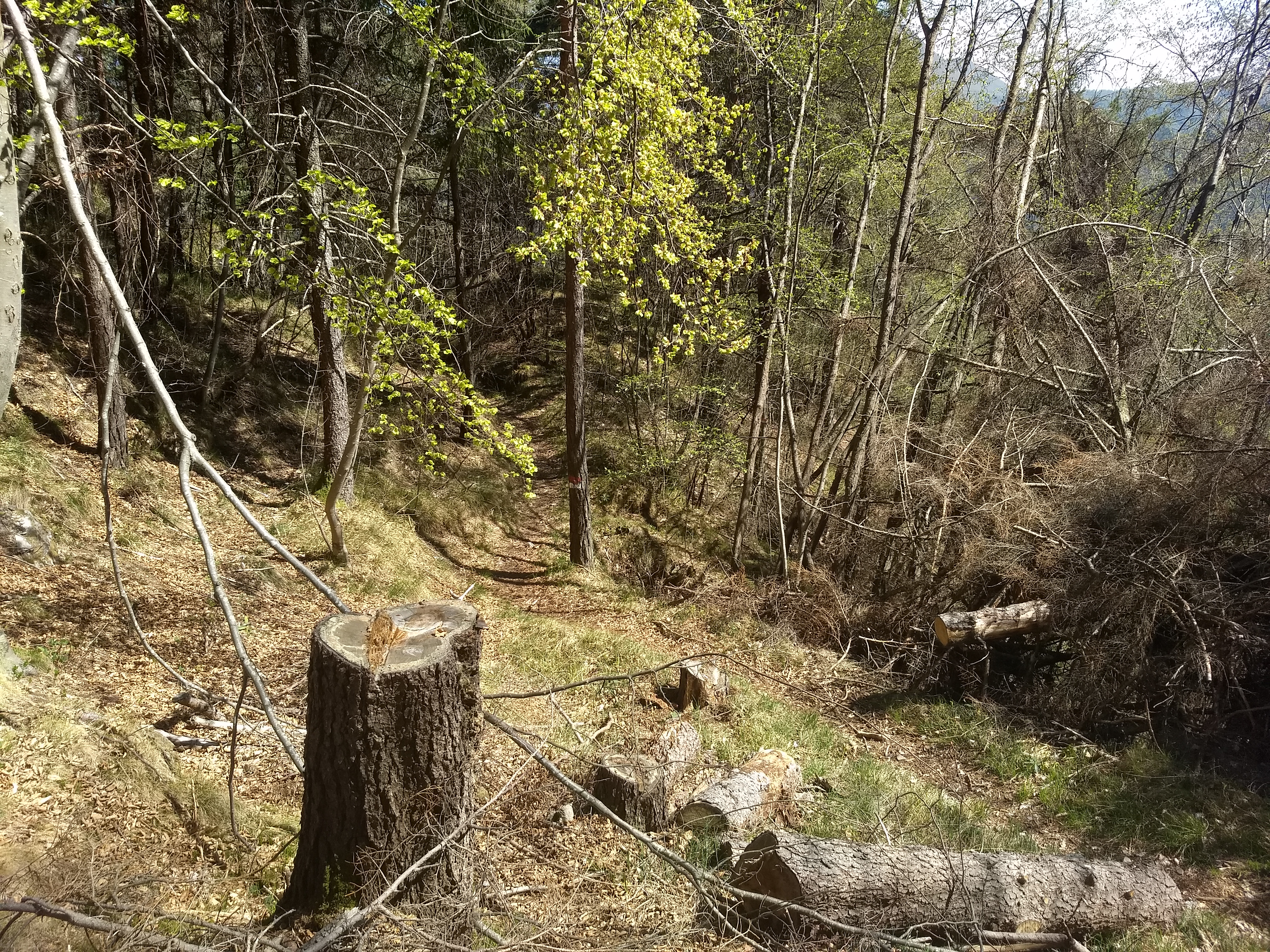
Junction of the trail from Bocca Croce that leads to Pavarì, Tavagnone and Bollone Mill

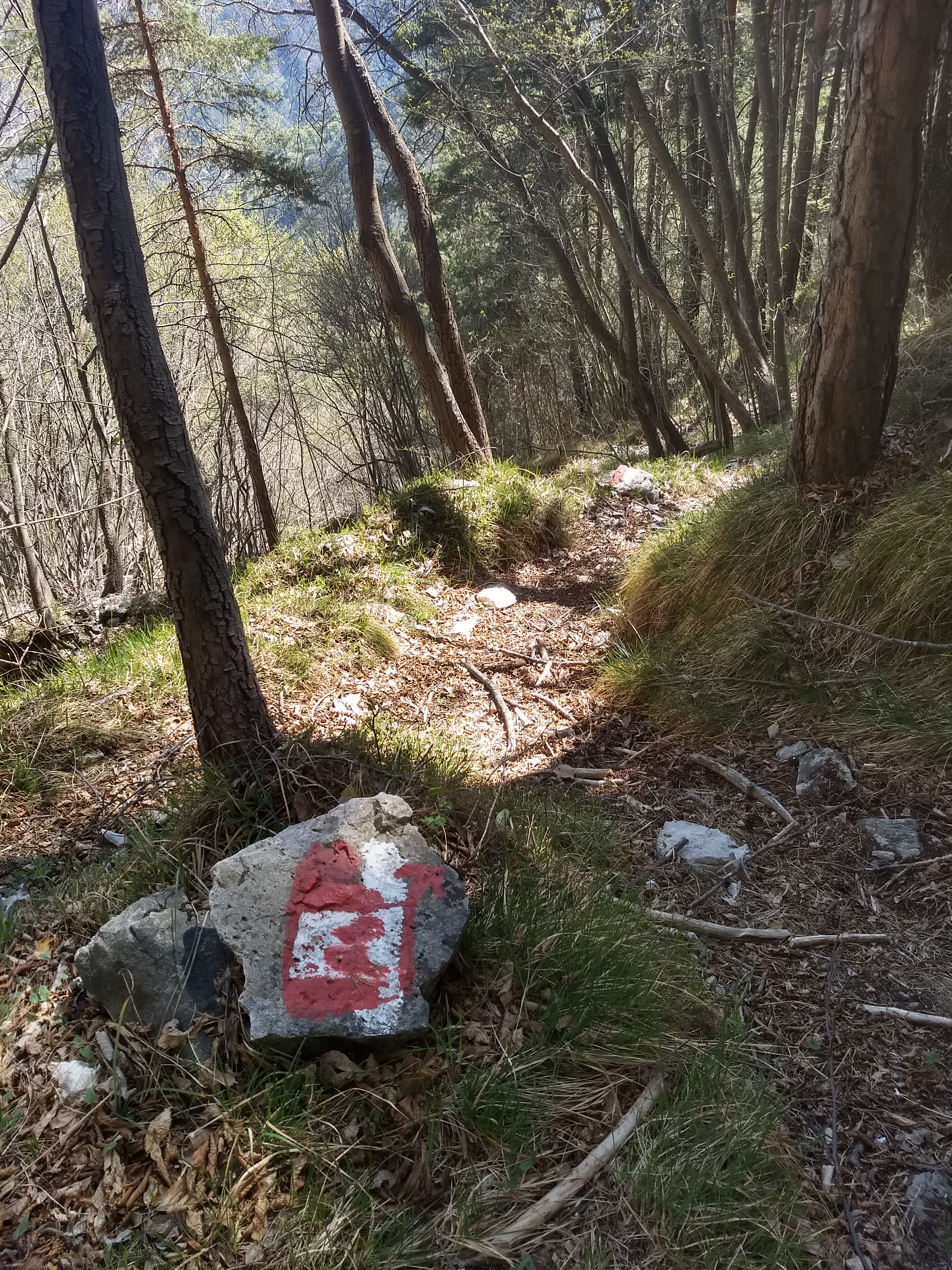
Junction of the trail in Costa delle Ombrie that leads to Droane

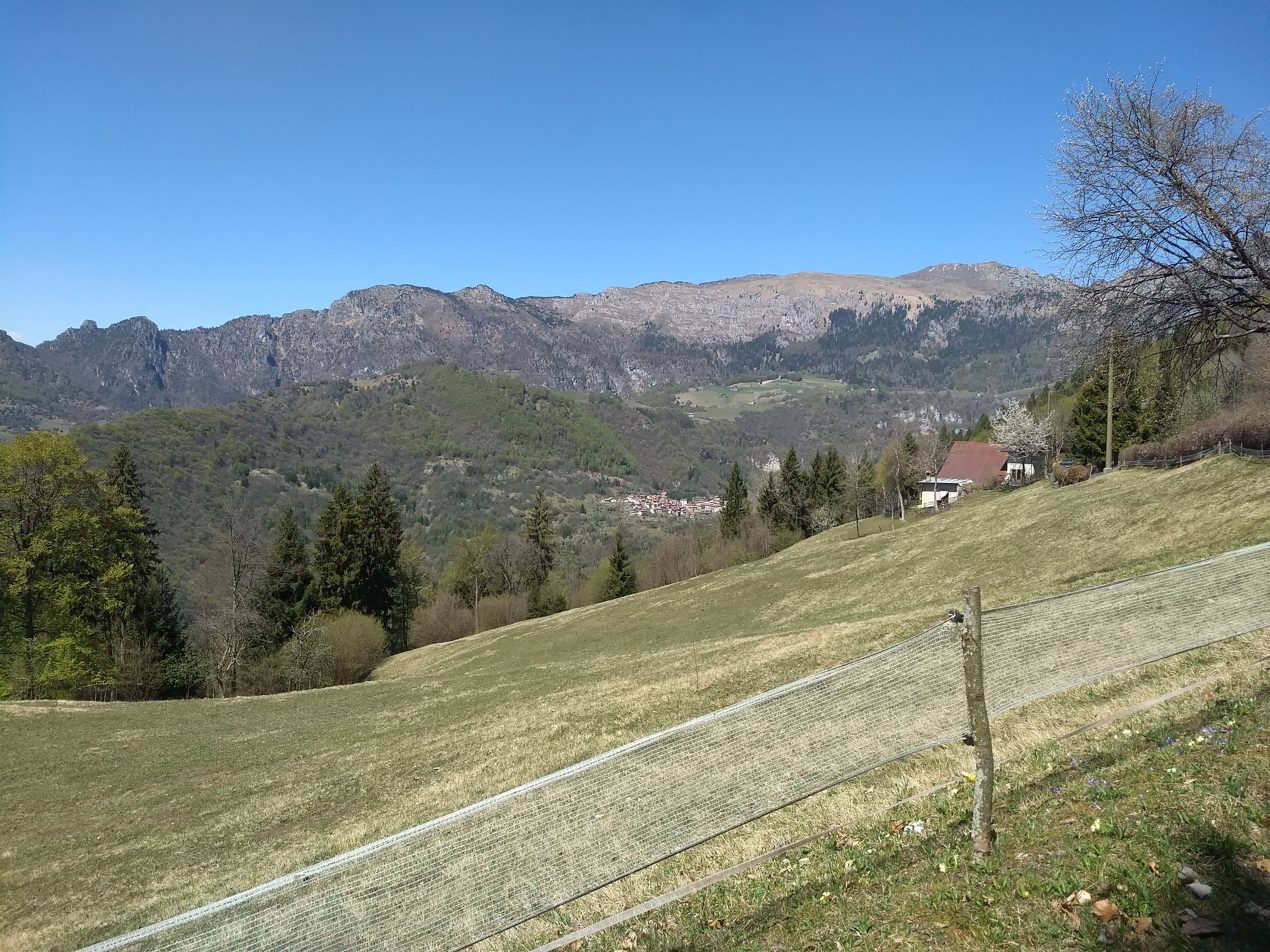
Mount Camiolo di Cima, barn known as the Bendoi barn, Magasa in the background

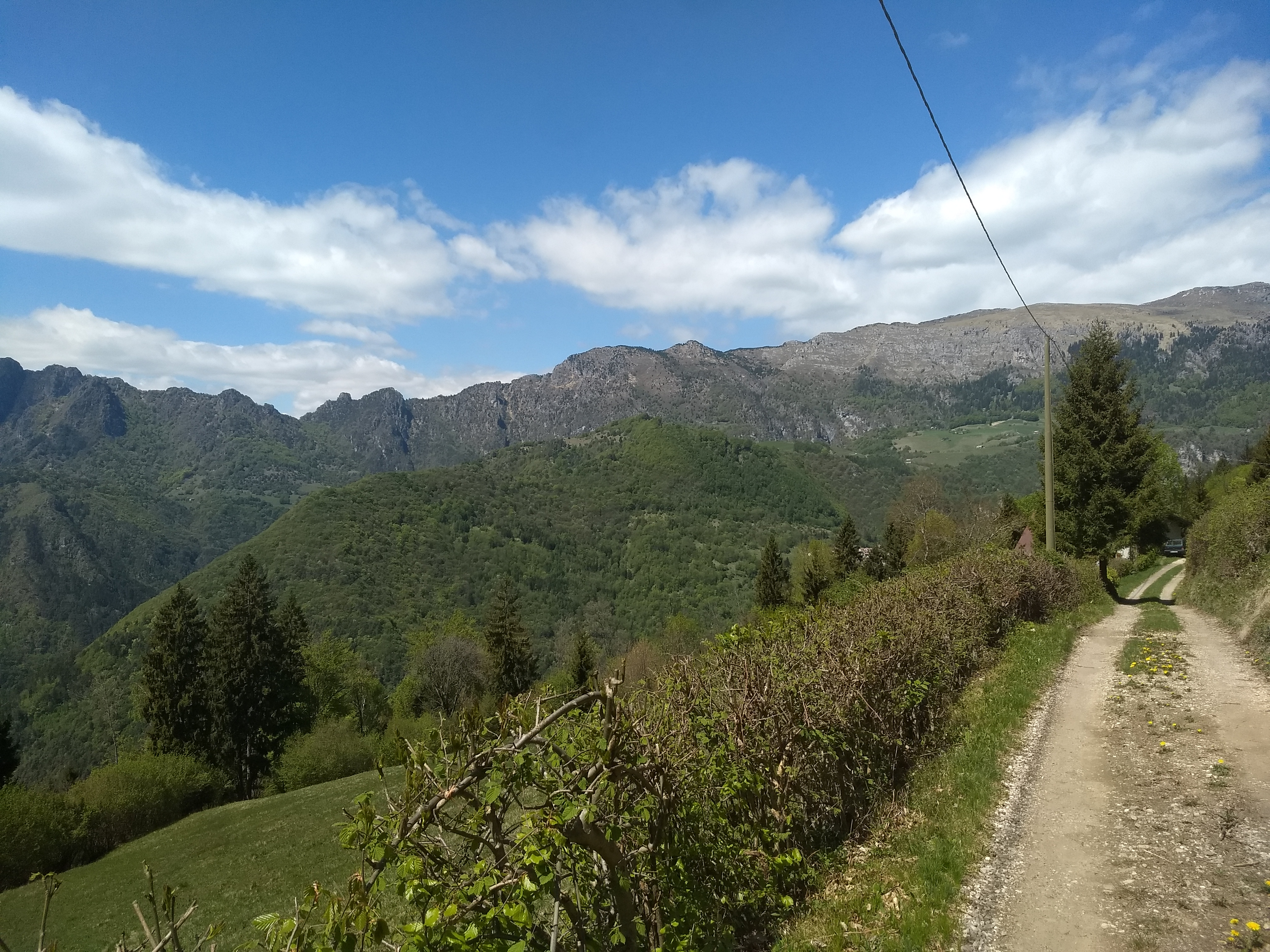
Mount Camiolo di Cima, bottom of the Bendoi and in the background Magasa and Mount Denai

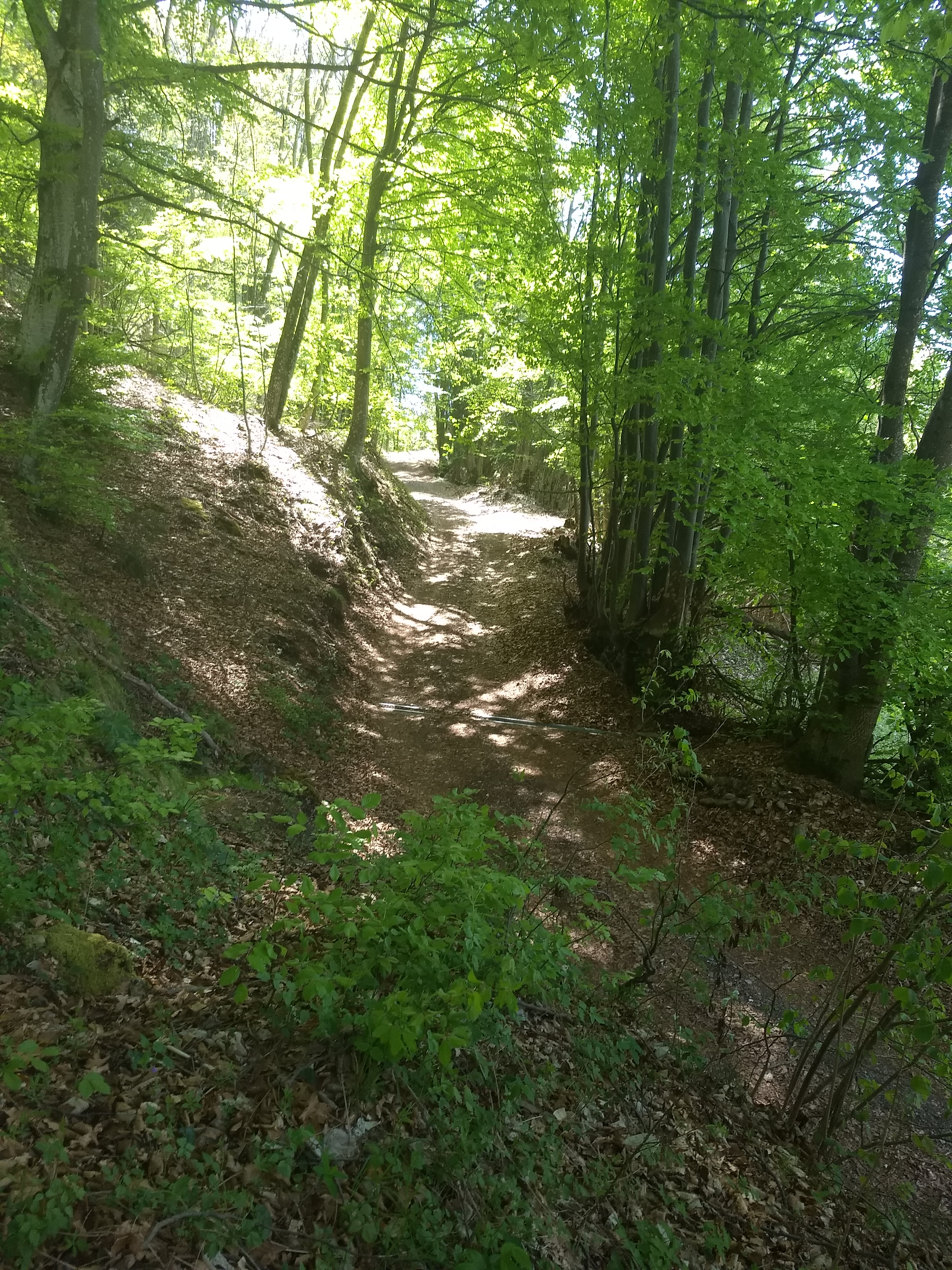
Mount Camiolo di Cima, carriage road leading to Bocca alla Croce

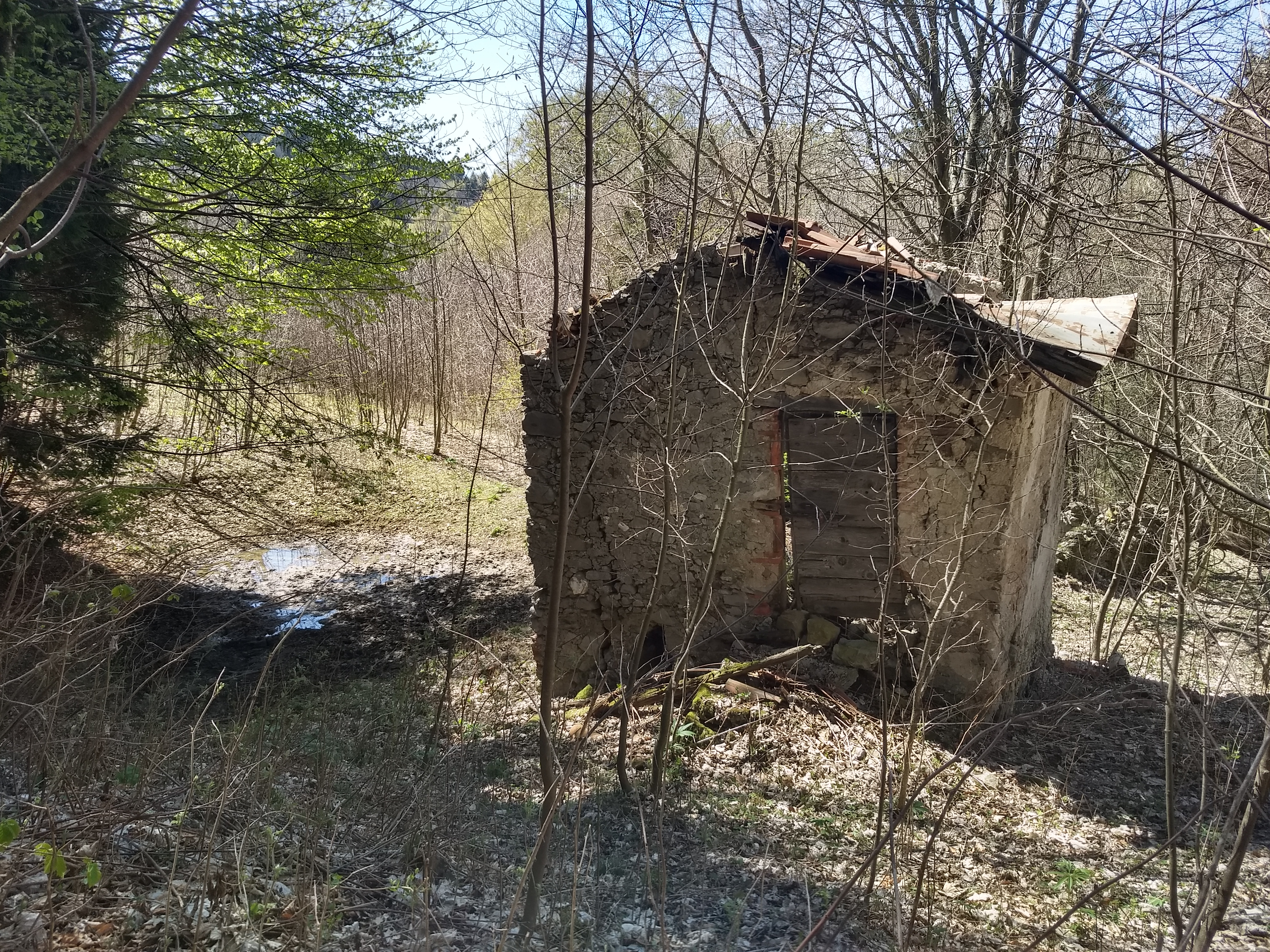
Mount Camiolo di Cima, ruins of the Fö barn

Mount Camiolo di Cima, ruins of the Fö barn

Mount Camiolo di Cima, ruins of the Fö barn

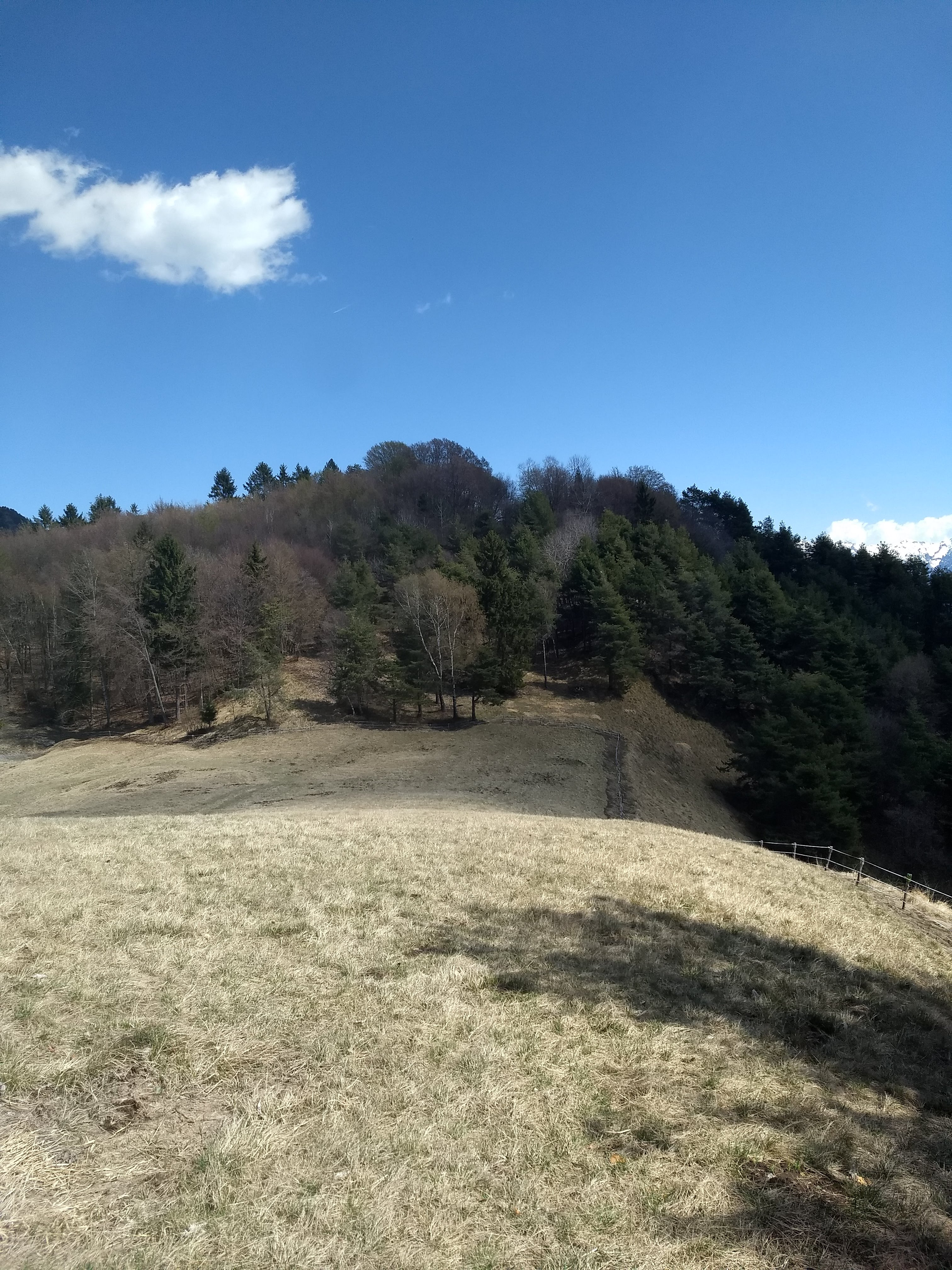
Mount Camiolo di Cima, the Pine Mountain so named in a 1511 parchment

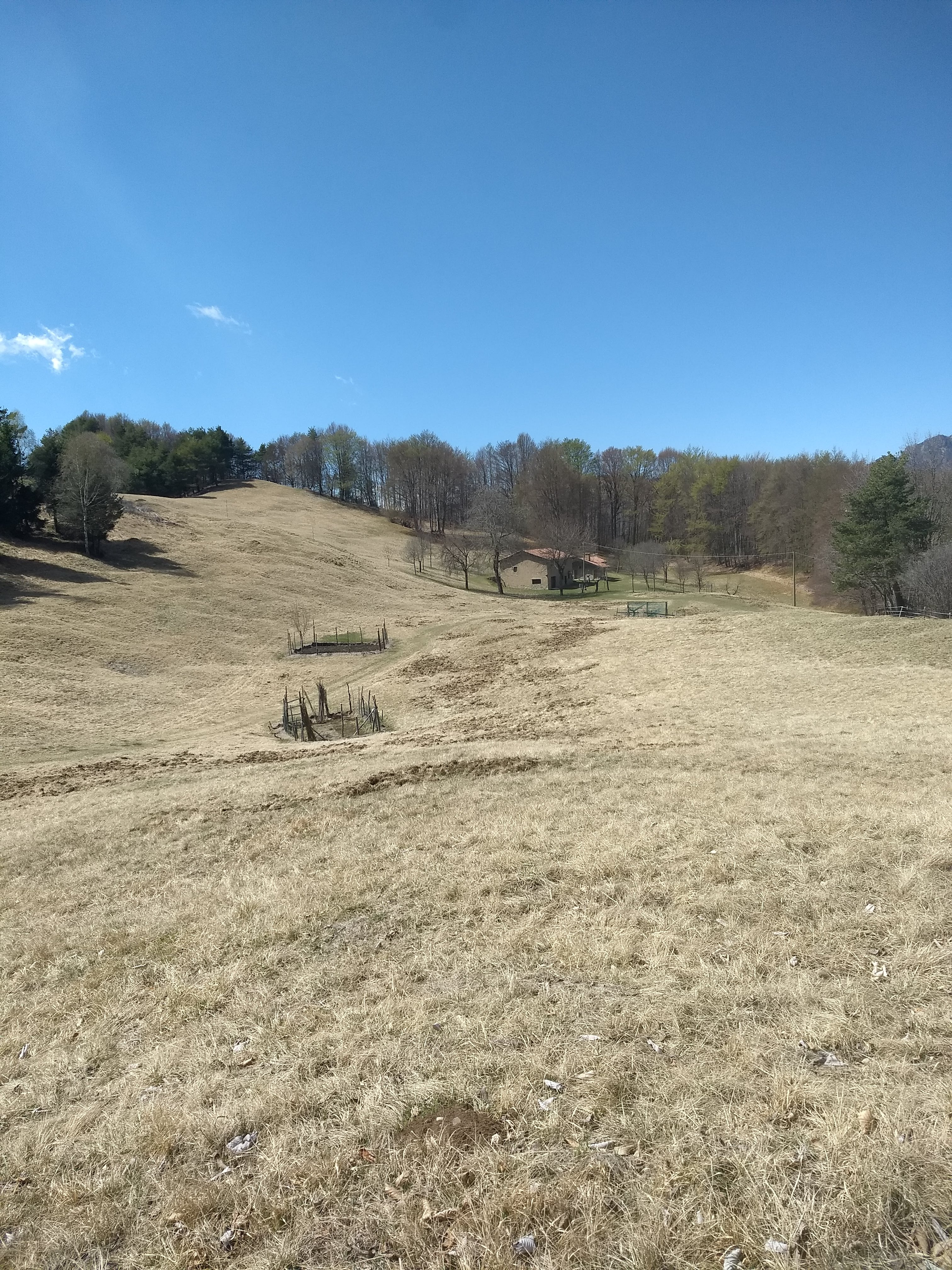
Mount Camiolo di Cima, Pesòc barn and the top of the mountain among the beech trees

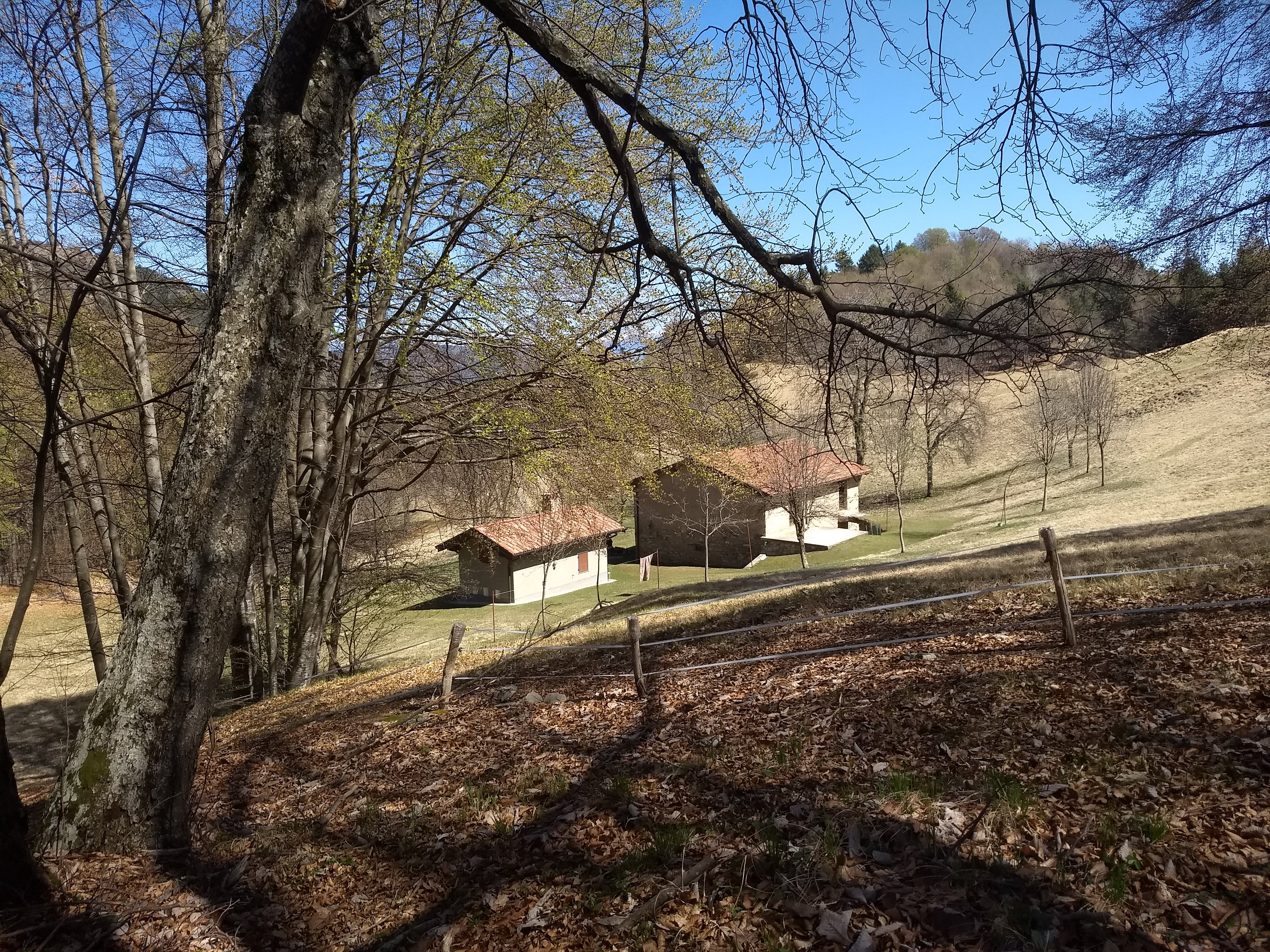
Mount Camiolo di Cima, barn known as Pesòc, a locality near the summit

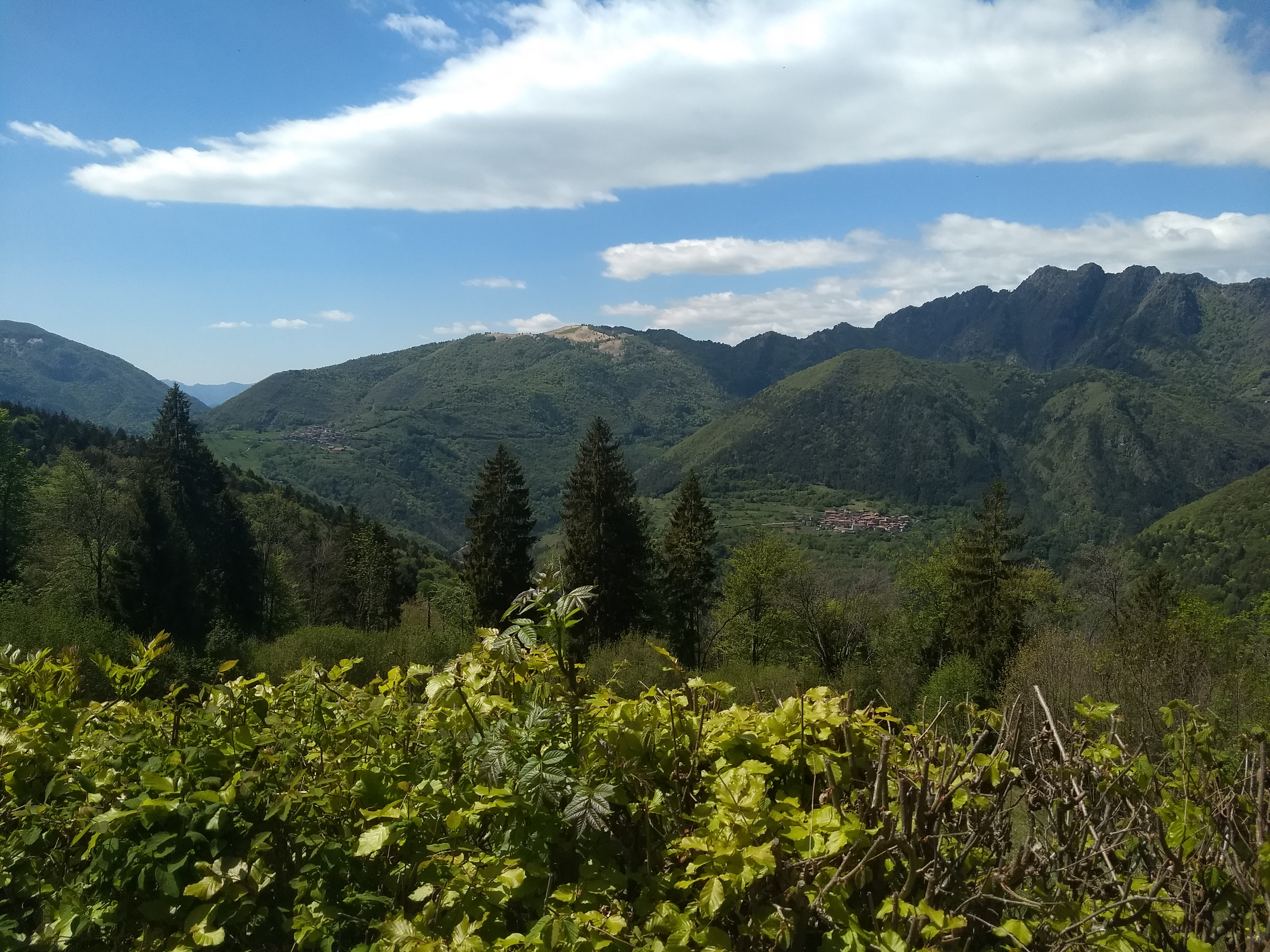
Mount Camiolo di Cima, panorama of Mount Stino, Moerna and Armo

Mount Camiolo di Cima, ruins of an ancient lime kiln near the Olva land

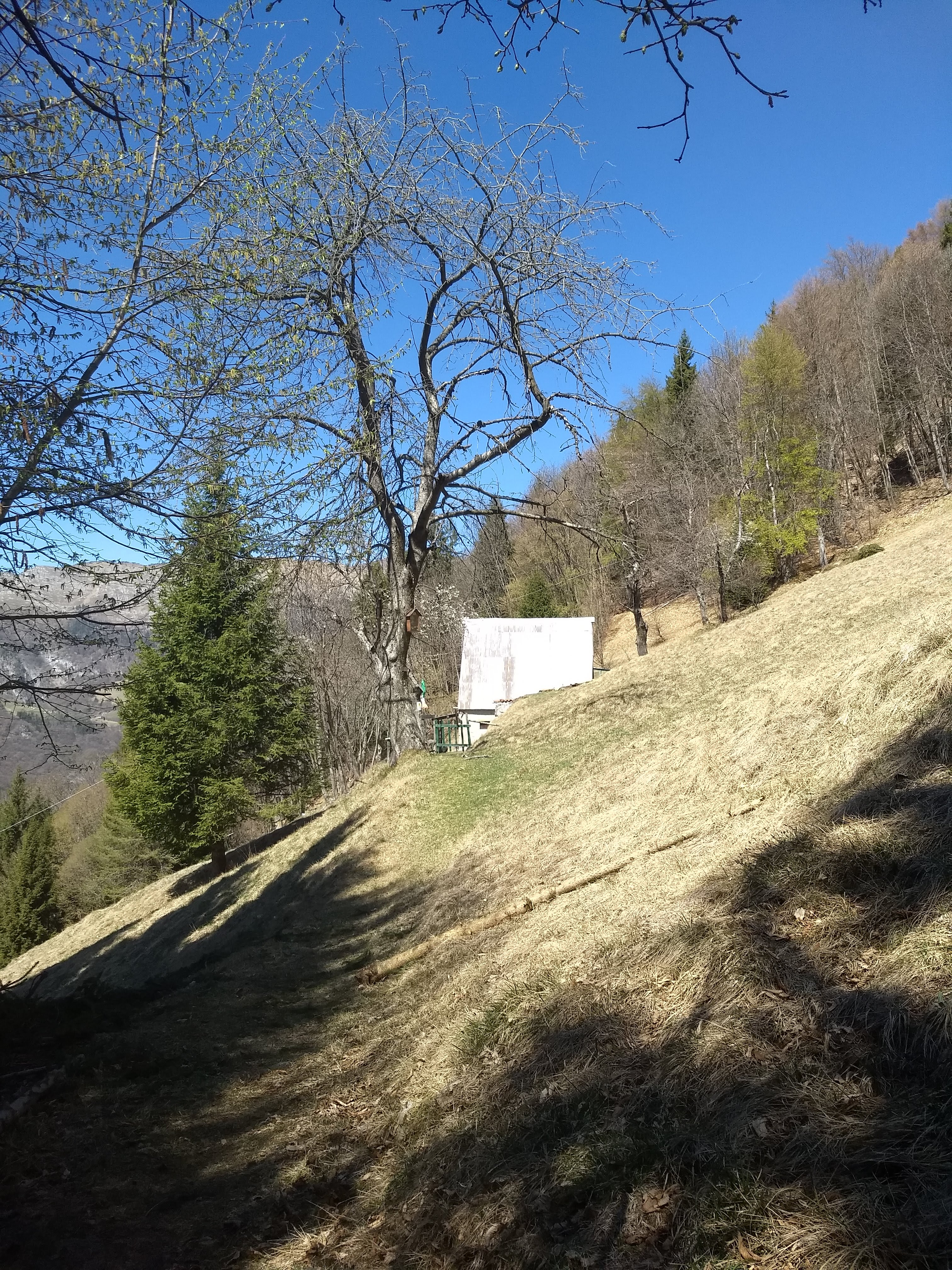
Mount Camiolo di Cima, barn known as the Olva.

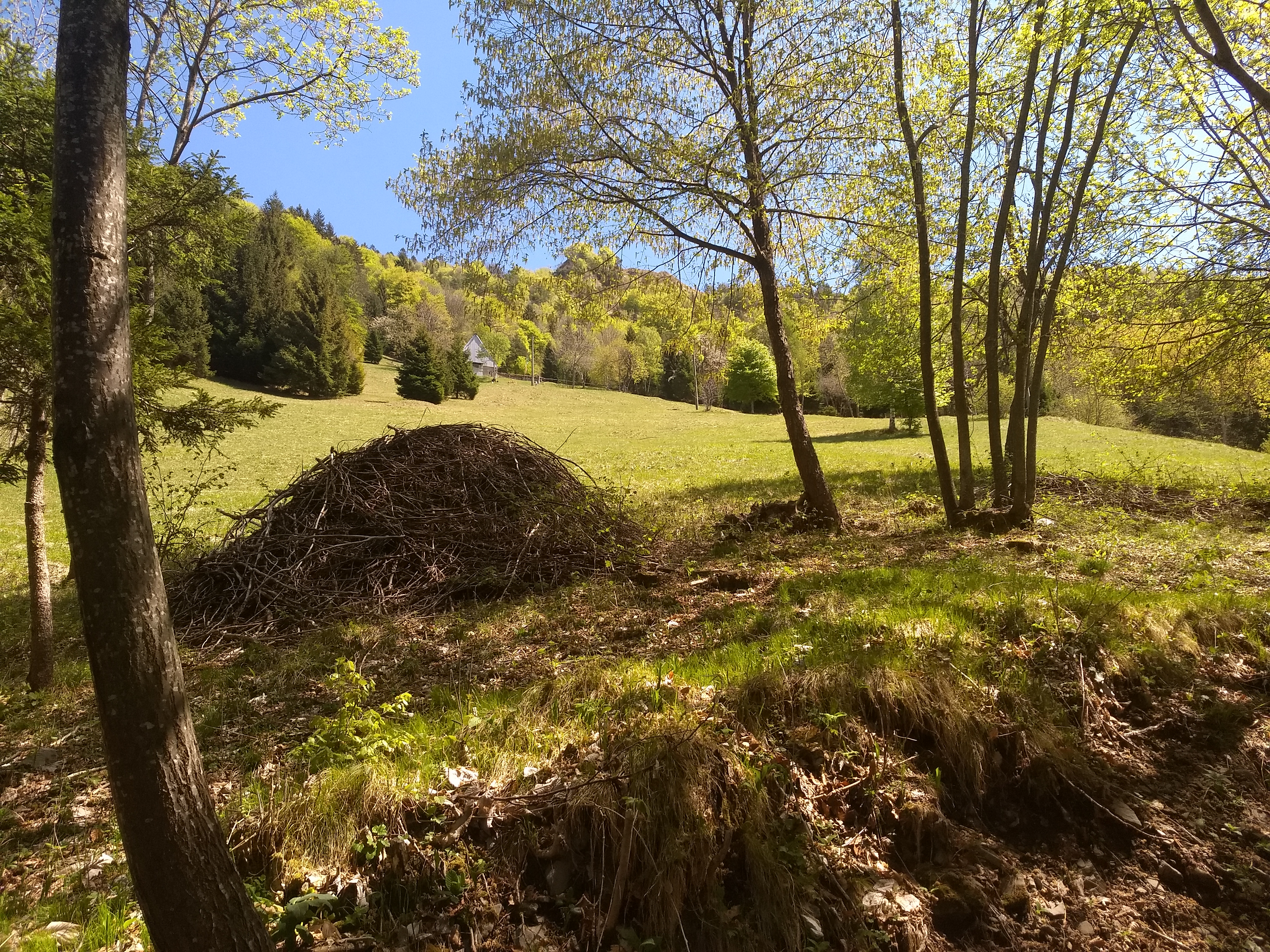
Mount Camiolo di Cima, Olva land

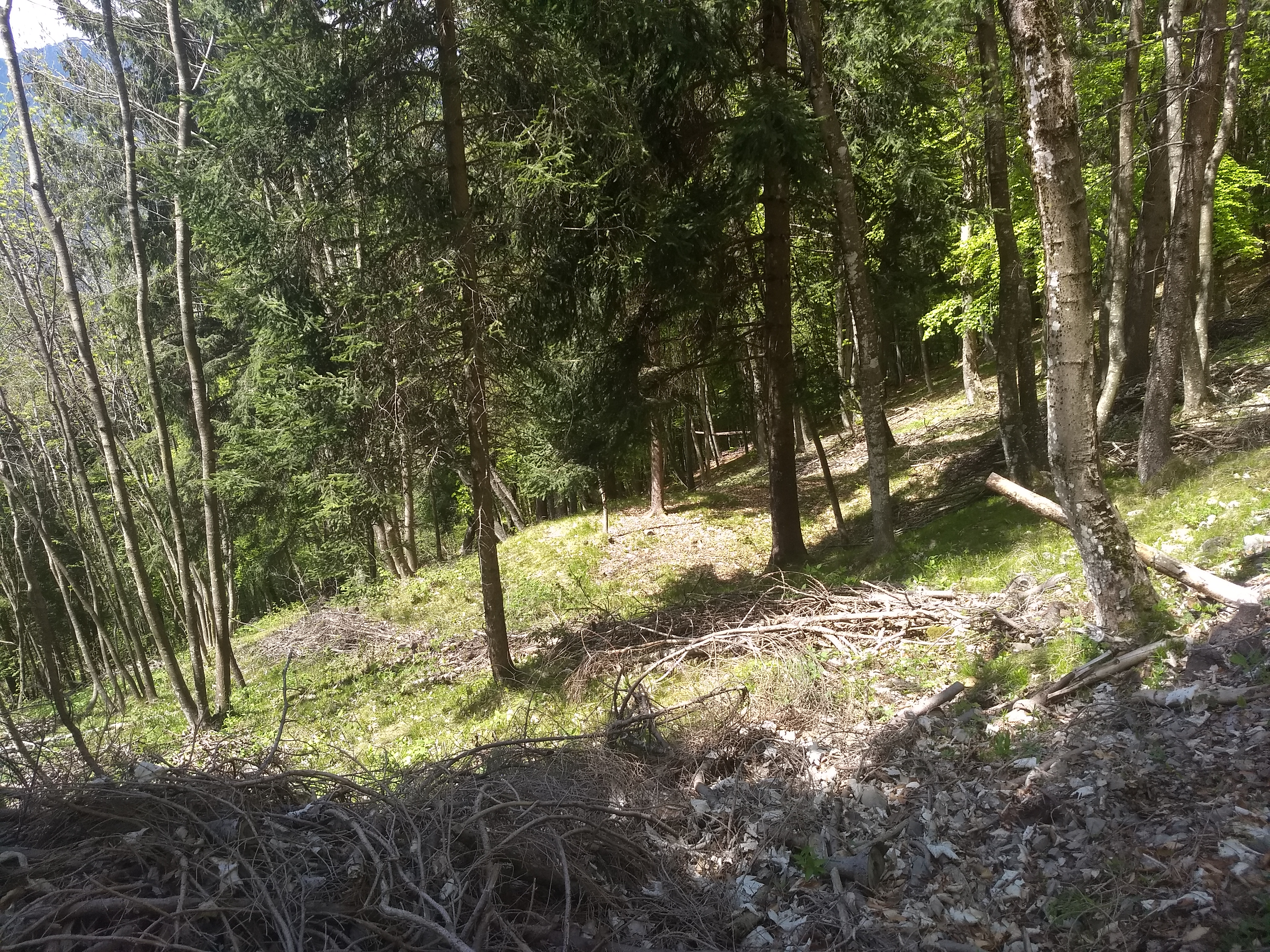
Mount Camiolo di Cima, barnyard of a charcoal kiln, locally called "gial," near the Olva land

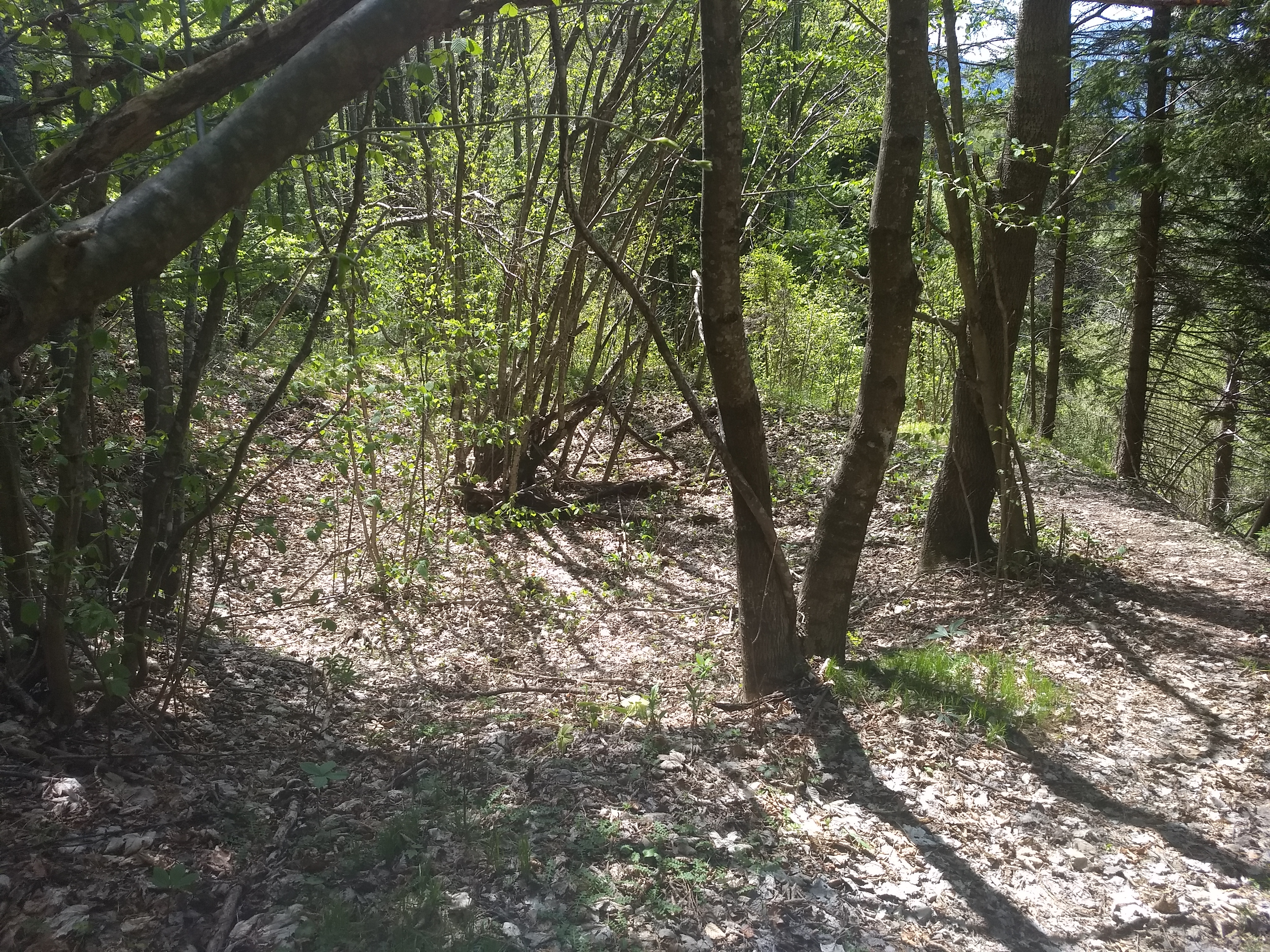
Mount Camiolo di Cima, barnyard of a charcoal kiln on the trail leading to the Olva land

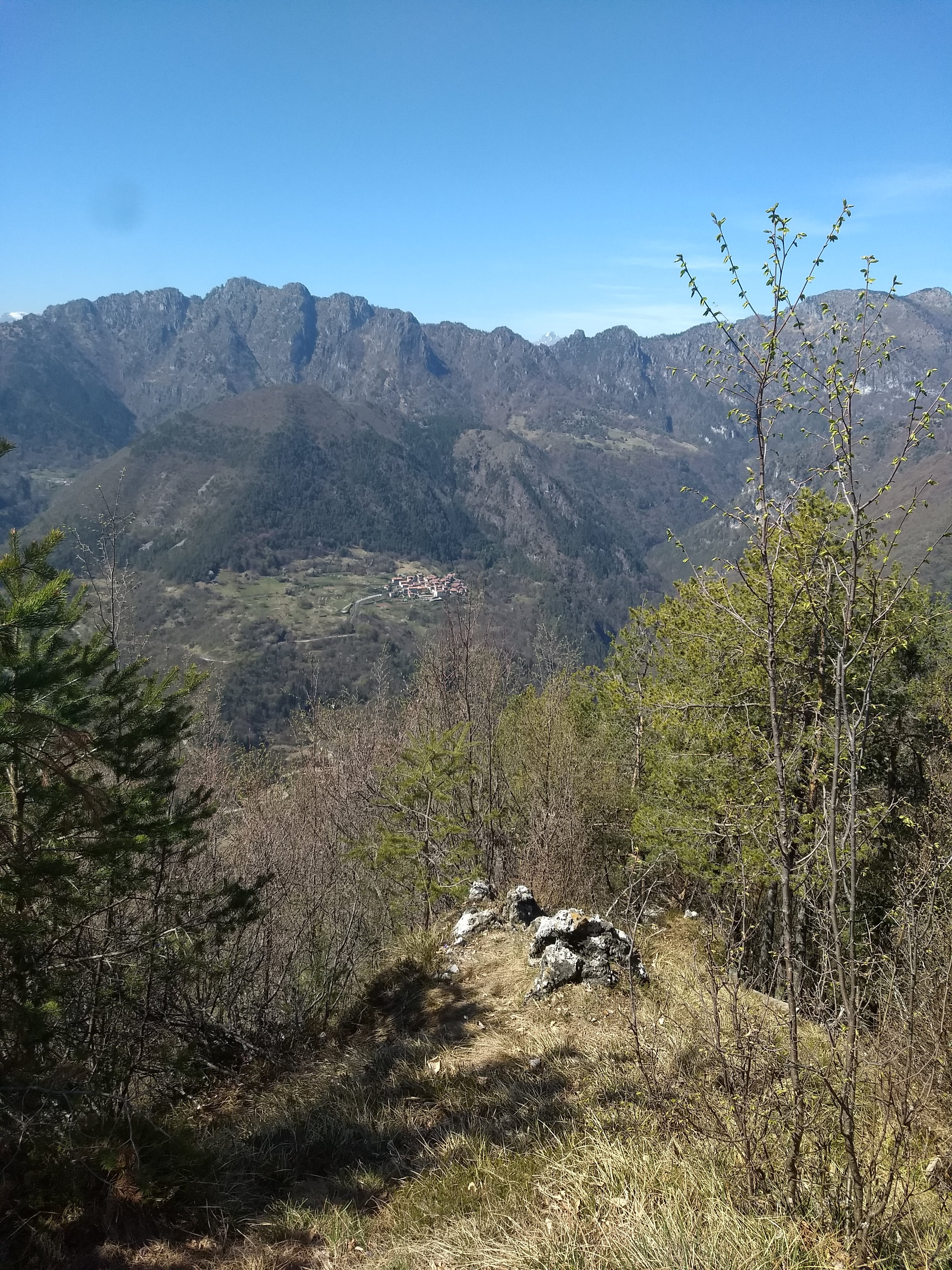
Mount Camiolo di Cima, Cima Camiolo or Pesòc with panorama of the village of Armo

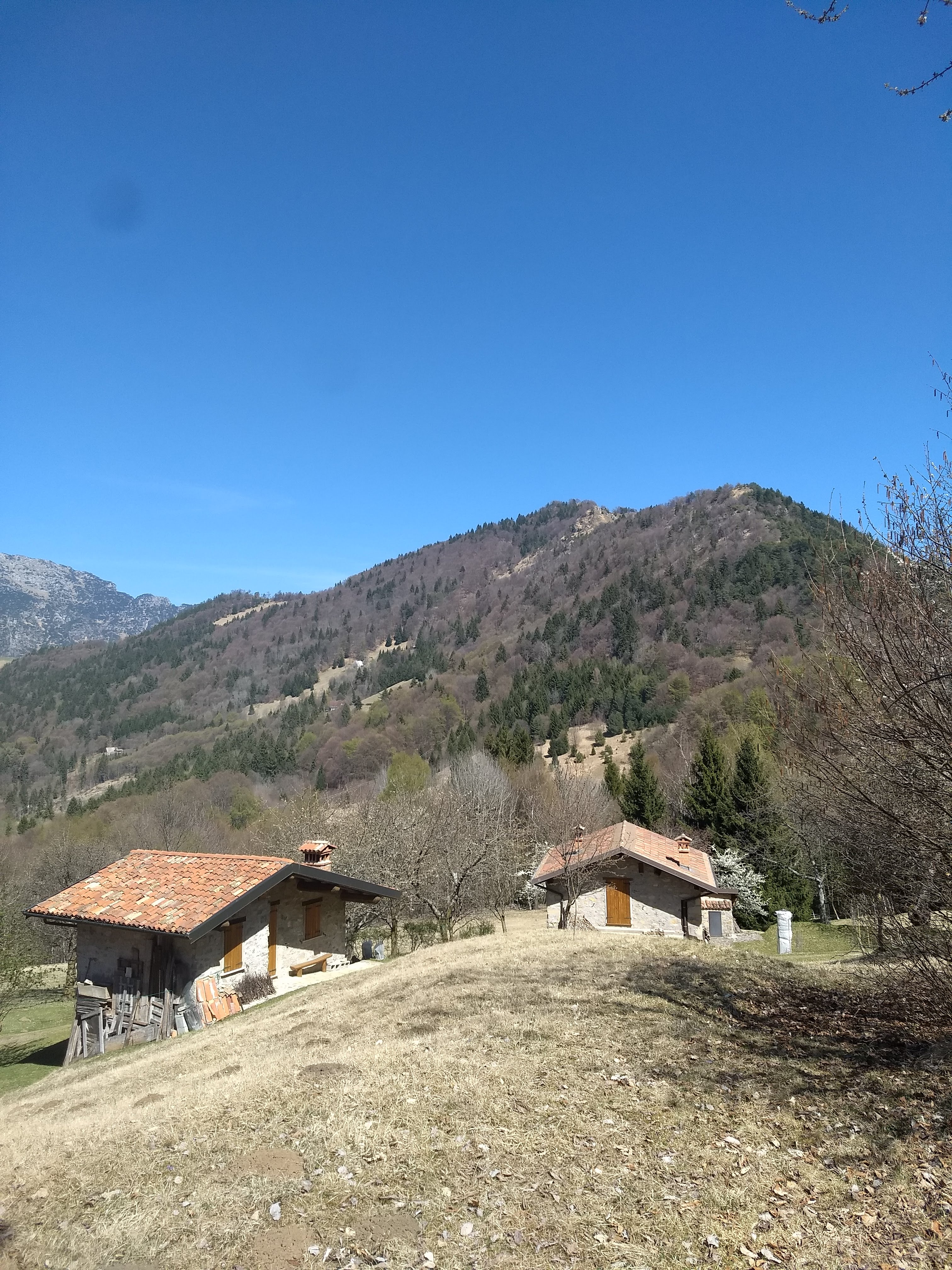
Mount Camiolo di Cima with a panorama in succession of the ridge of Mount Mangà, Cima Gosauer and Spiaz

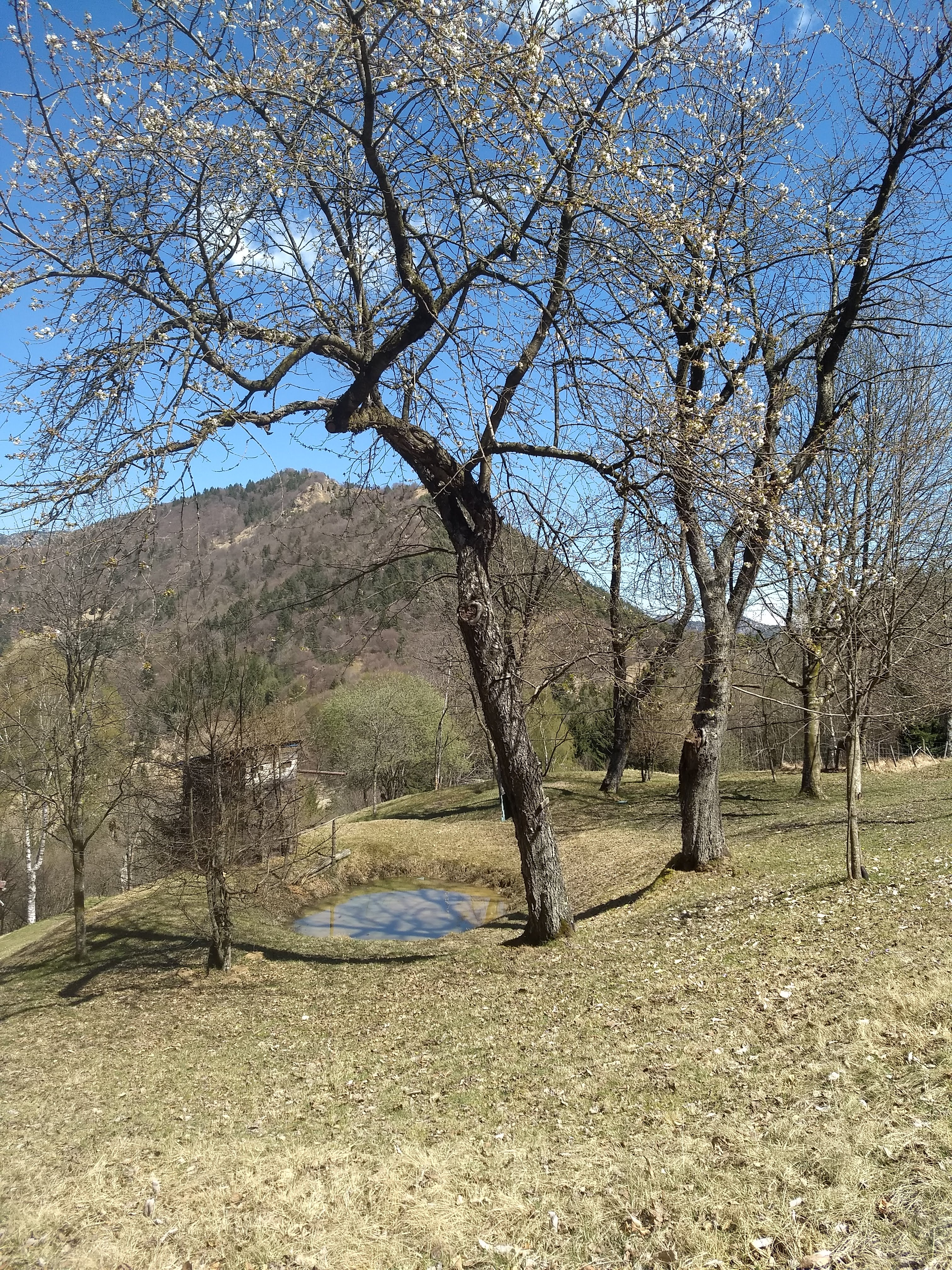
Mount Camiolo di Cima, waterhole, locally called lavàc

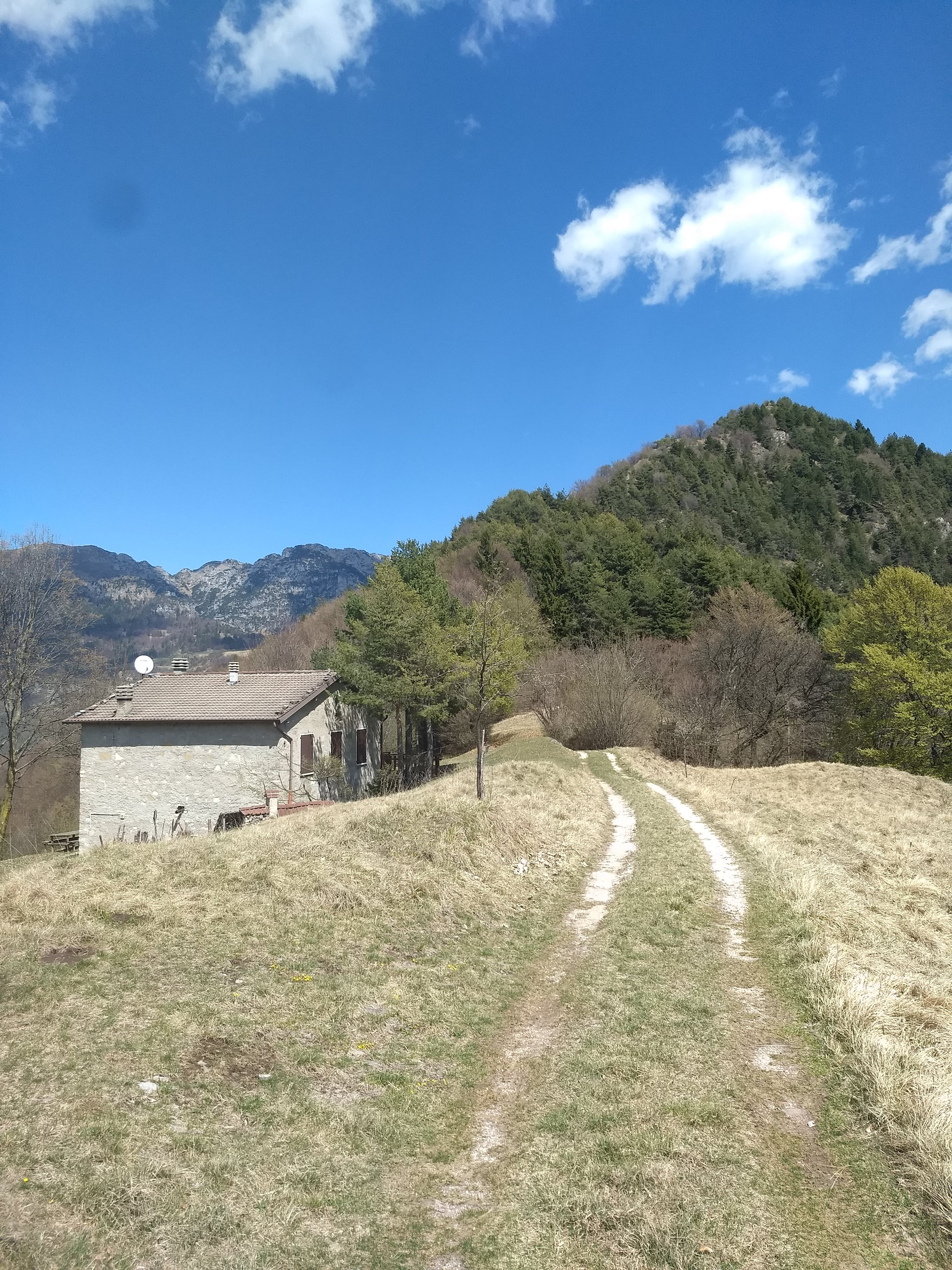
Mount Camiolo di Cima, Bocca alla Croce pass and barn of the same name

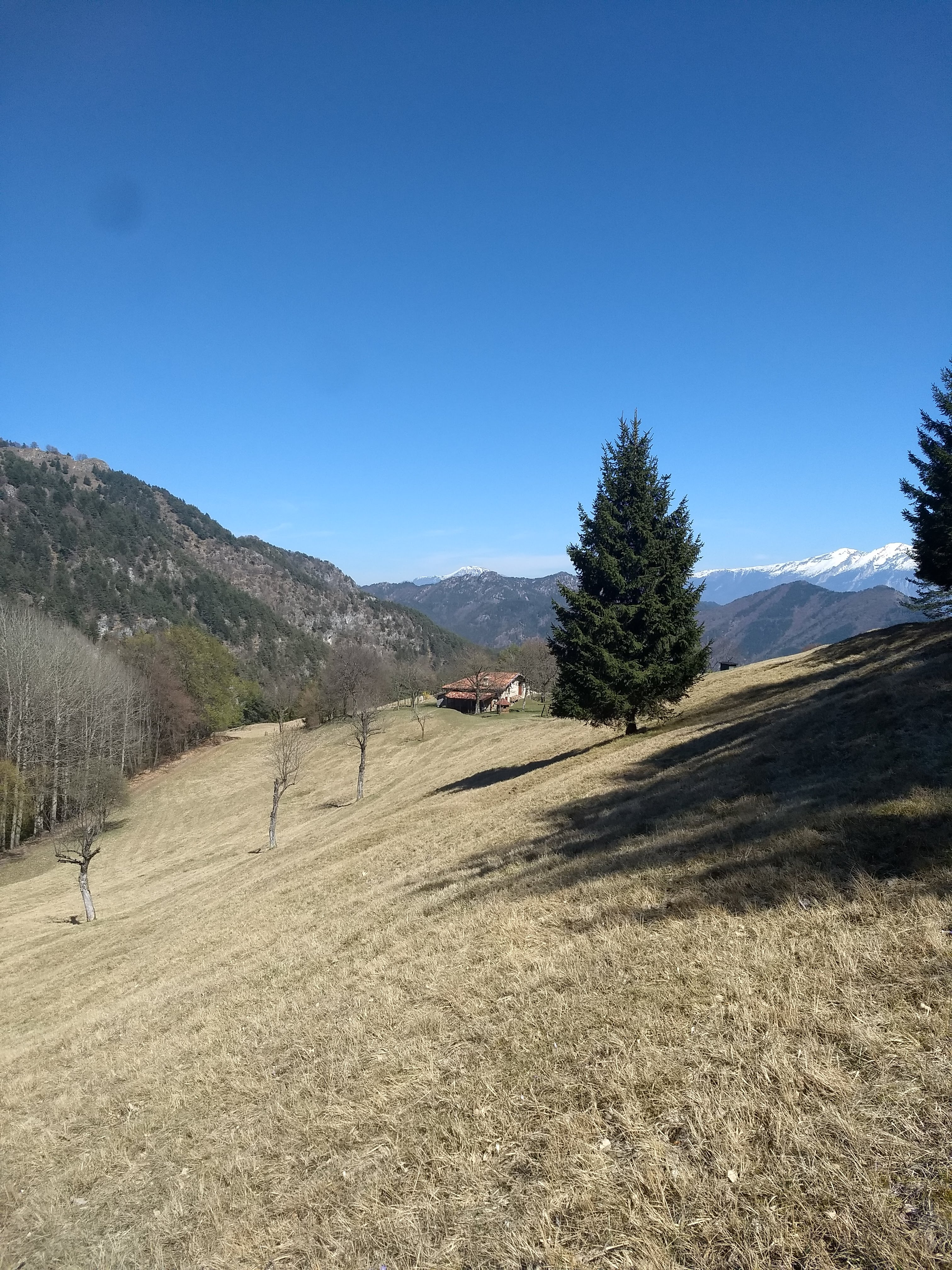
Mount Camiolo di Cima, hump and barn known as Ápene. In 1511 it was called Pine

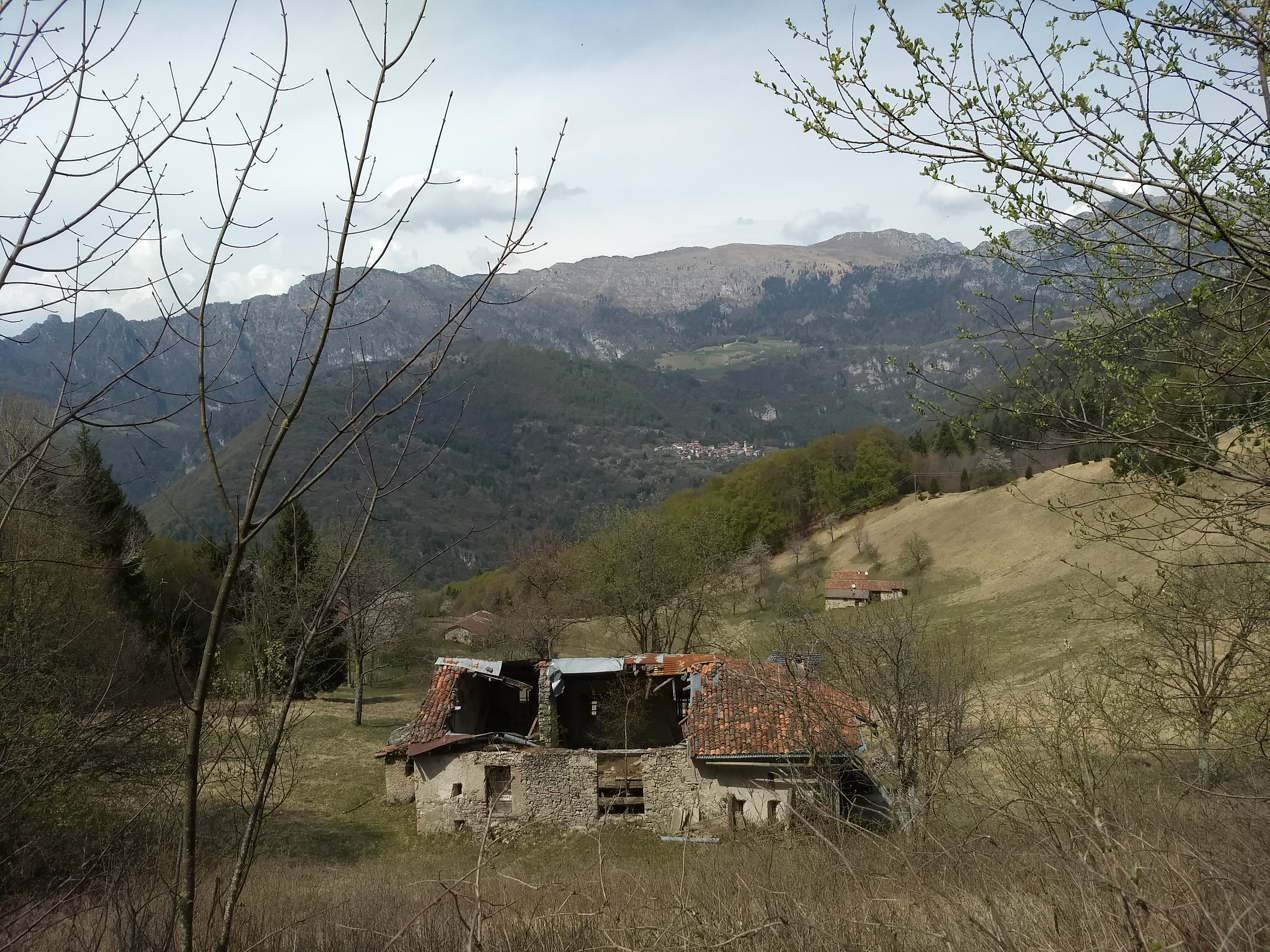
Mount Camiolo di Mezzo, in the foreground the ruins of the barn known as the Fabbrica, built in 1877 by Filippo Viani, in the background the barns known as the Pir

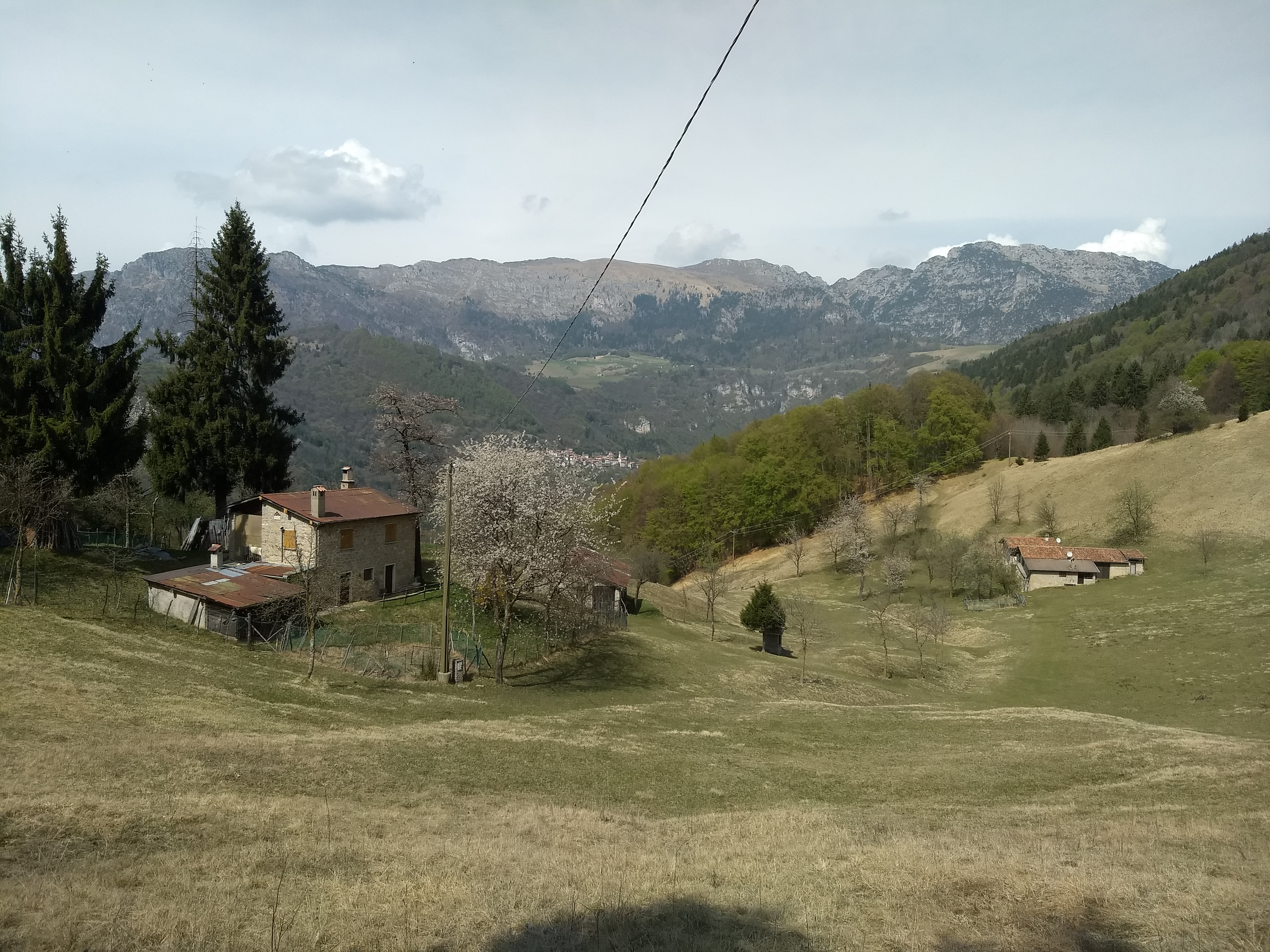
Mount Camiolo di Mezzo, barns known as Pir barns.

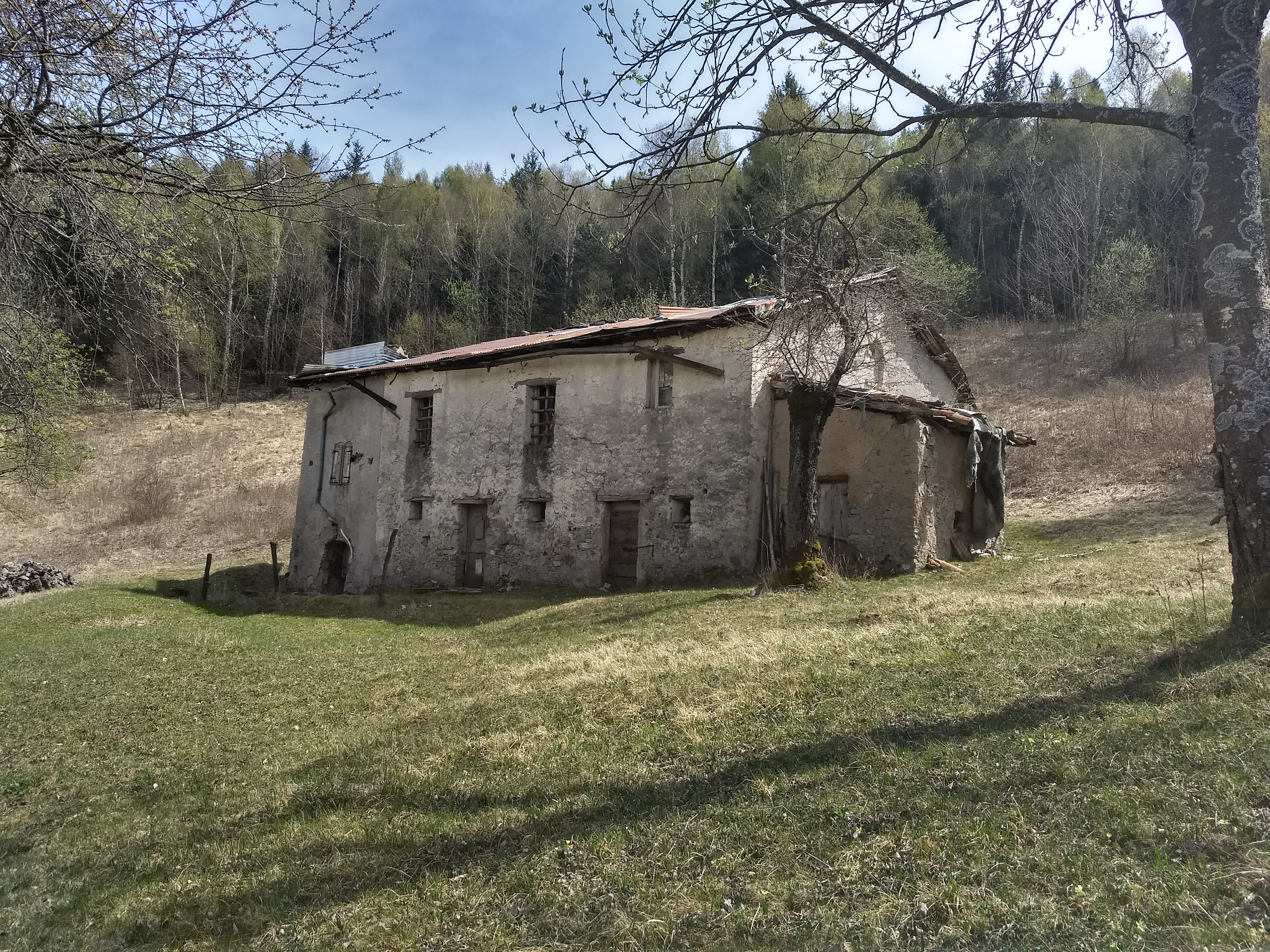
Mount Camiolo di Mezzo, barn known as Fabbrica

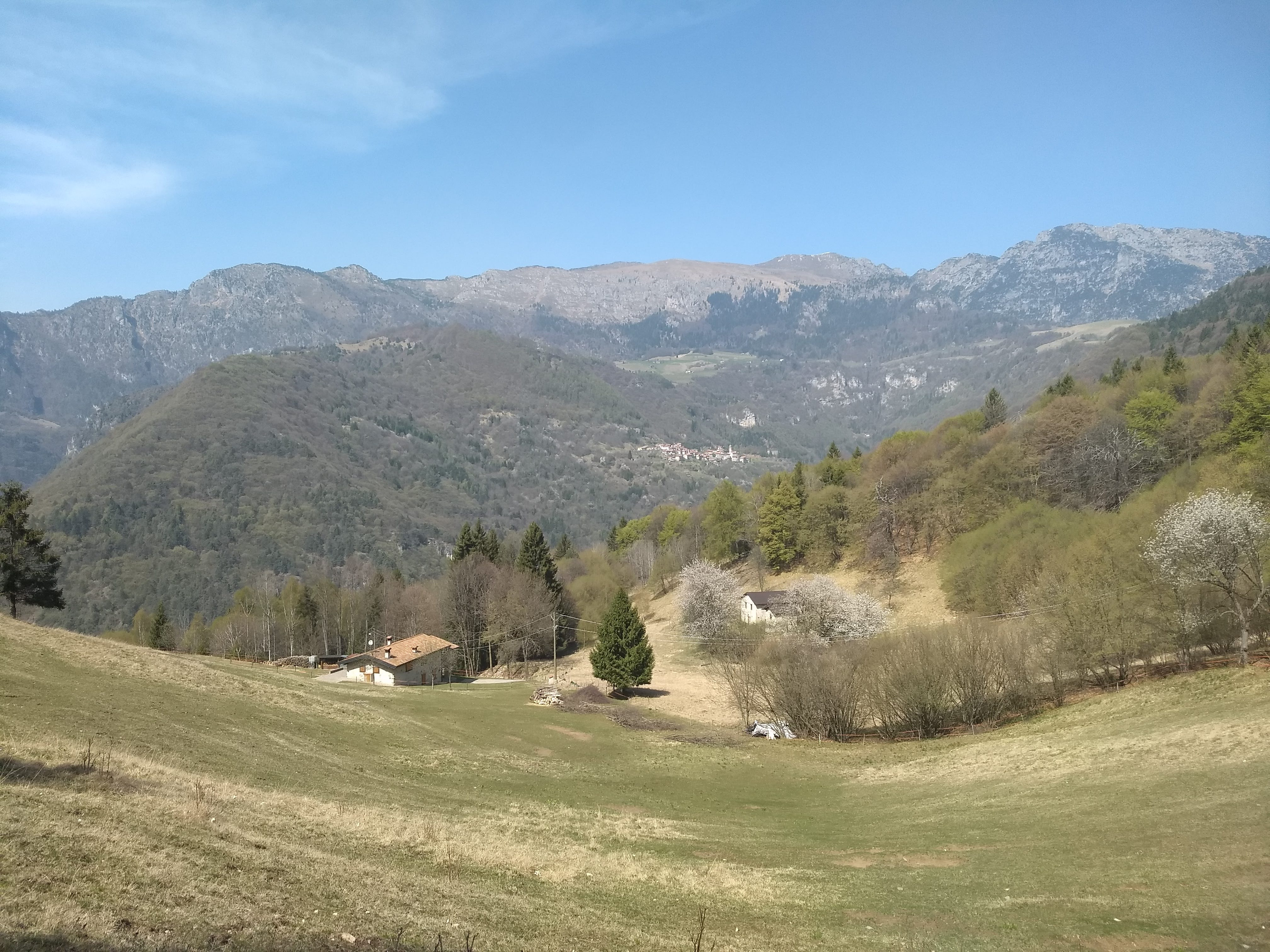
Mount Camiolo di Fondo, barns of the Massa, on the left Massa del Botér, on the right Massa dei Bernàrc, in the background Magasa

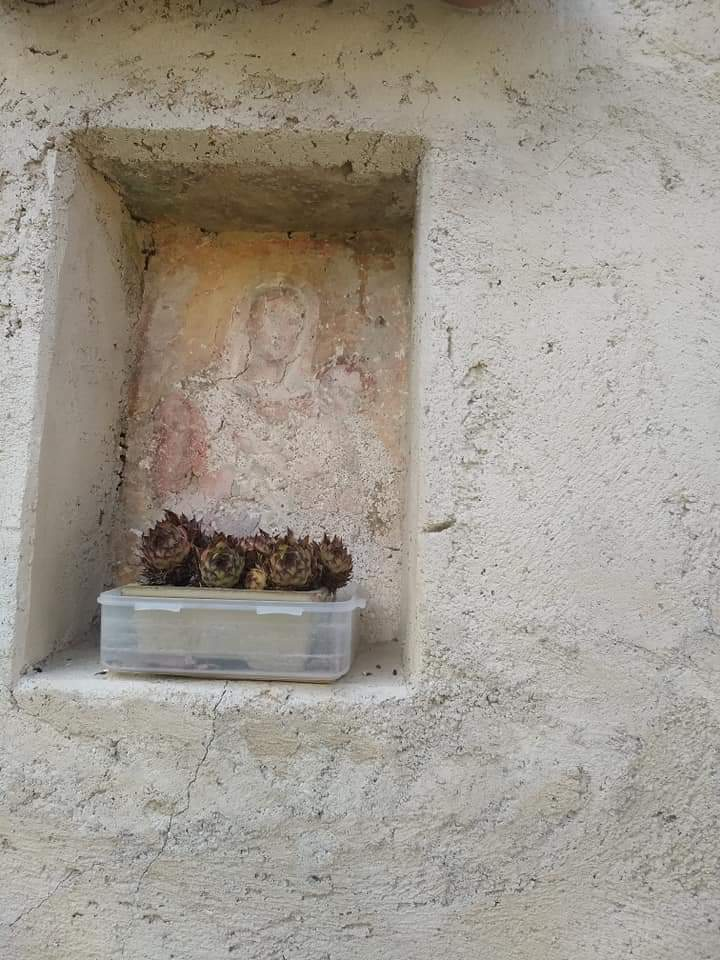
Mount Camiolo di Fondo, fresco on the wall of the Massa del Botér land.

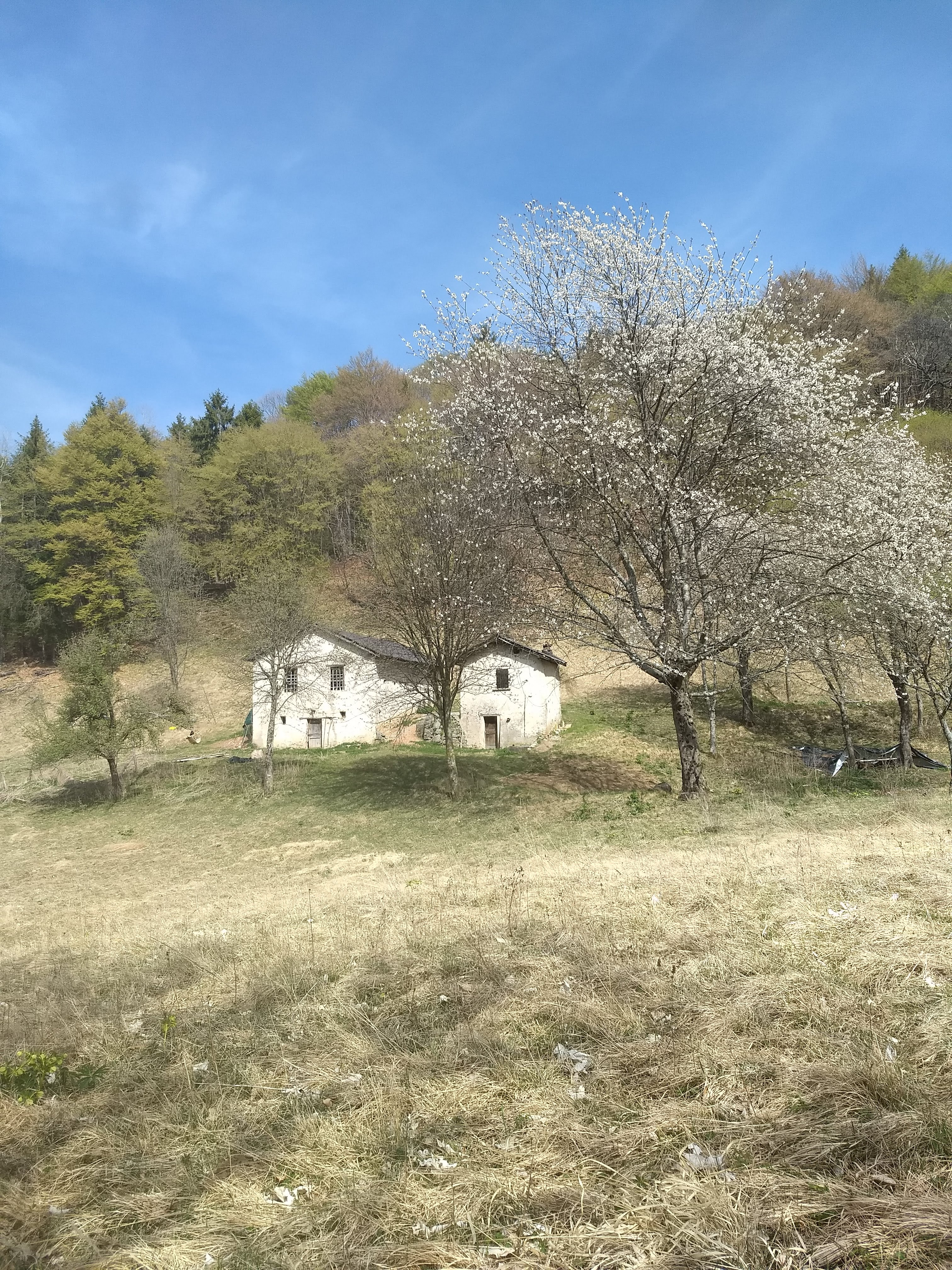
Mount Camiolo di Fondo, barn known as Massa dei Bernàrc

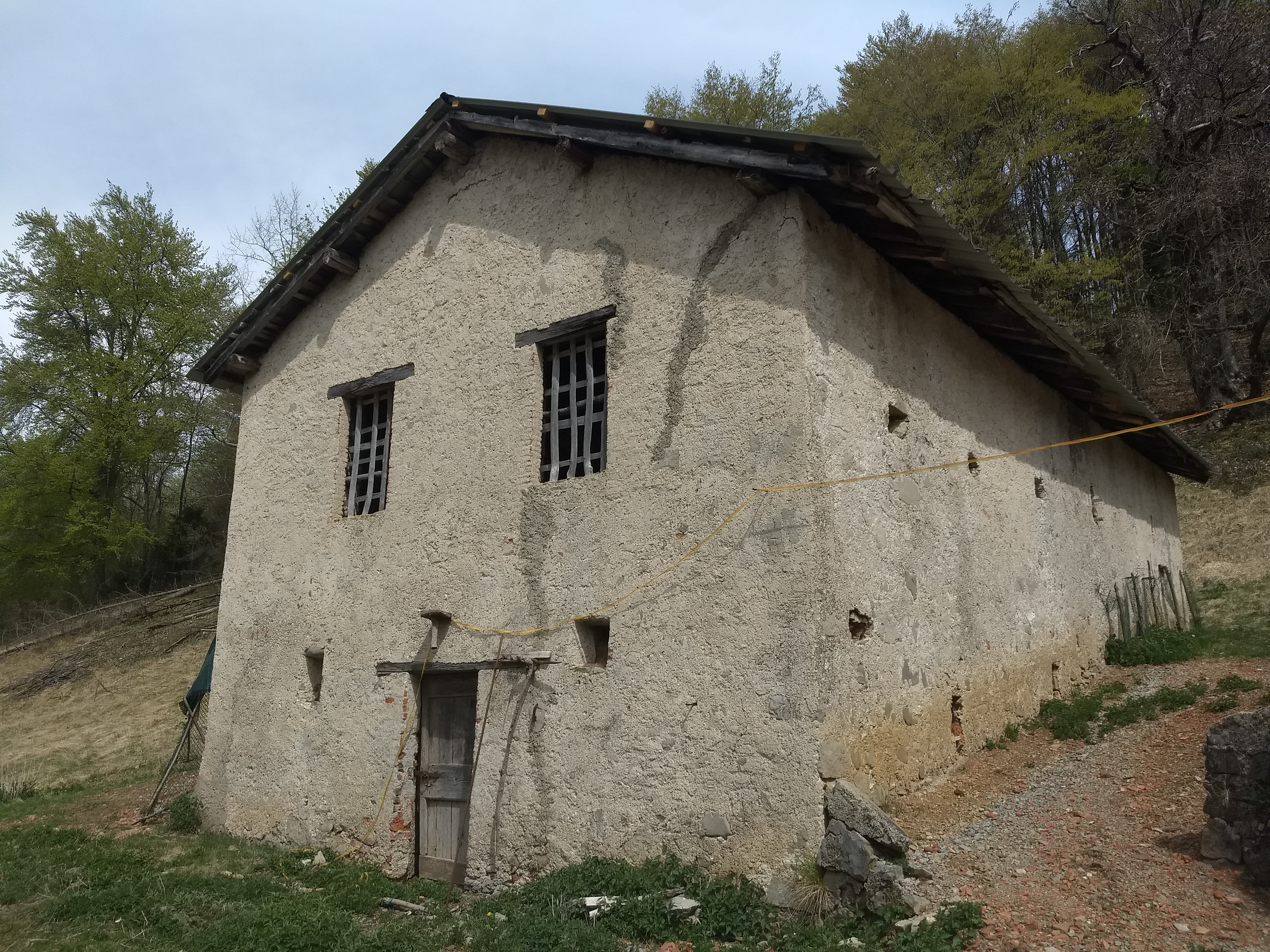
Mount Camiolo di Fondo, barn known as Massa dei Bernàrc

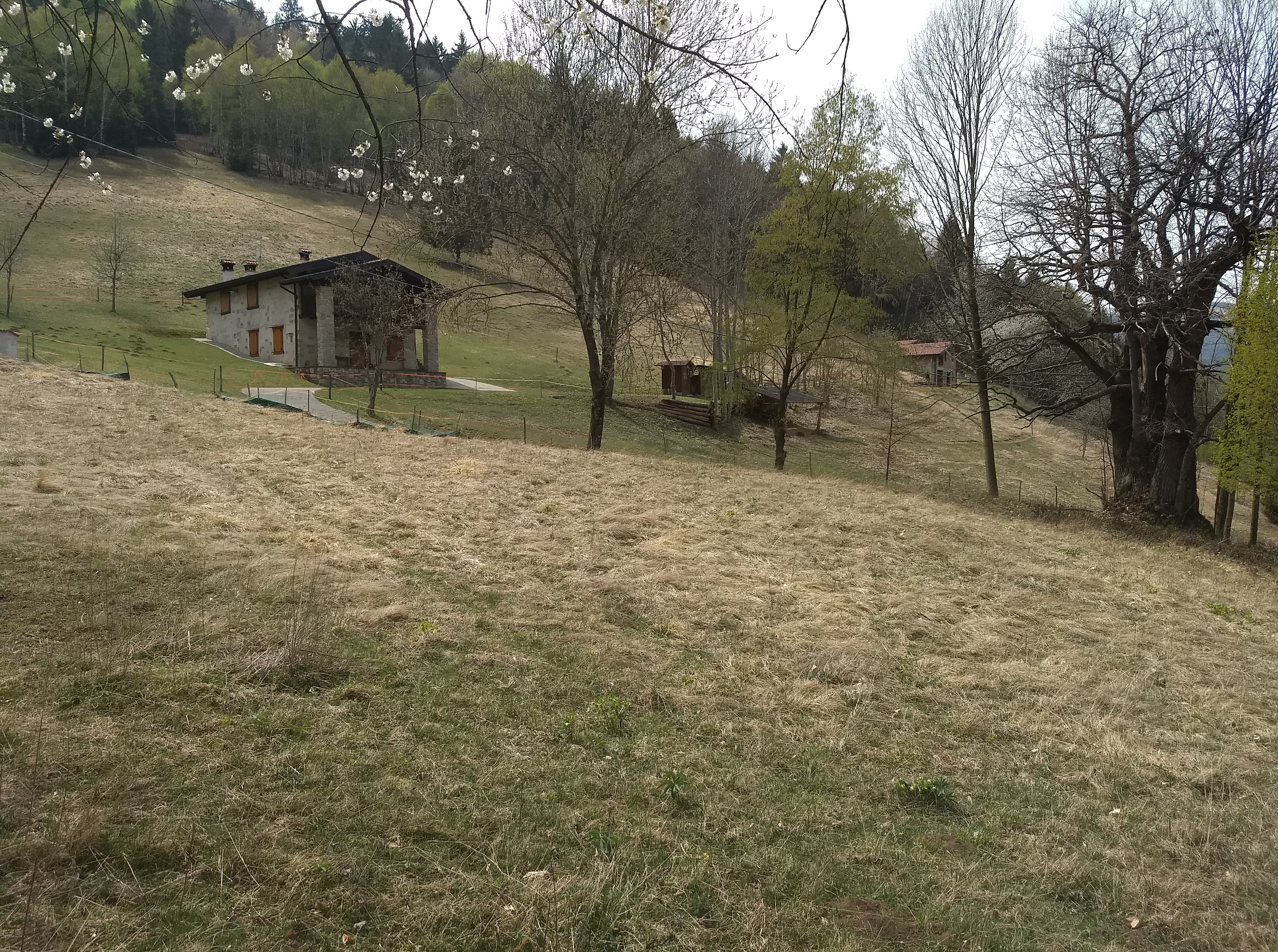
Mount Camiolo di Fondo, barns known as Massa dei Botér and to the right Massa dei Mangane

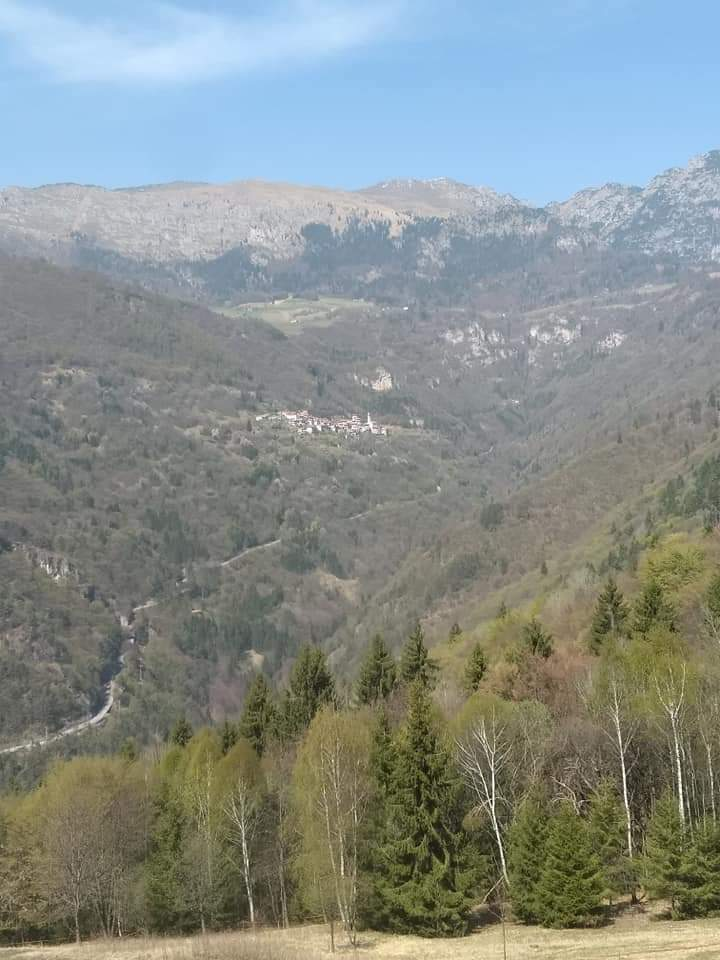
Mount Camiolo di Fondo, Magasa taken from the Massa dei Mangane land

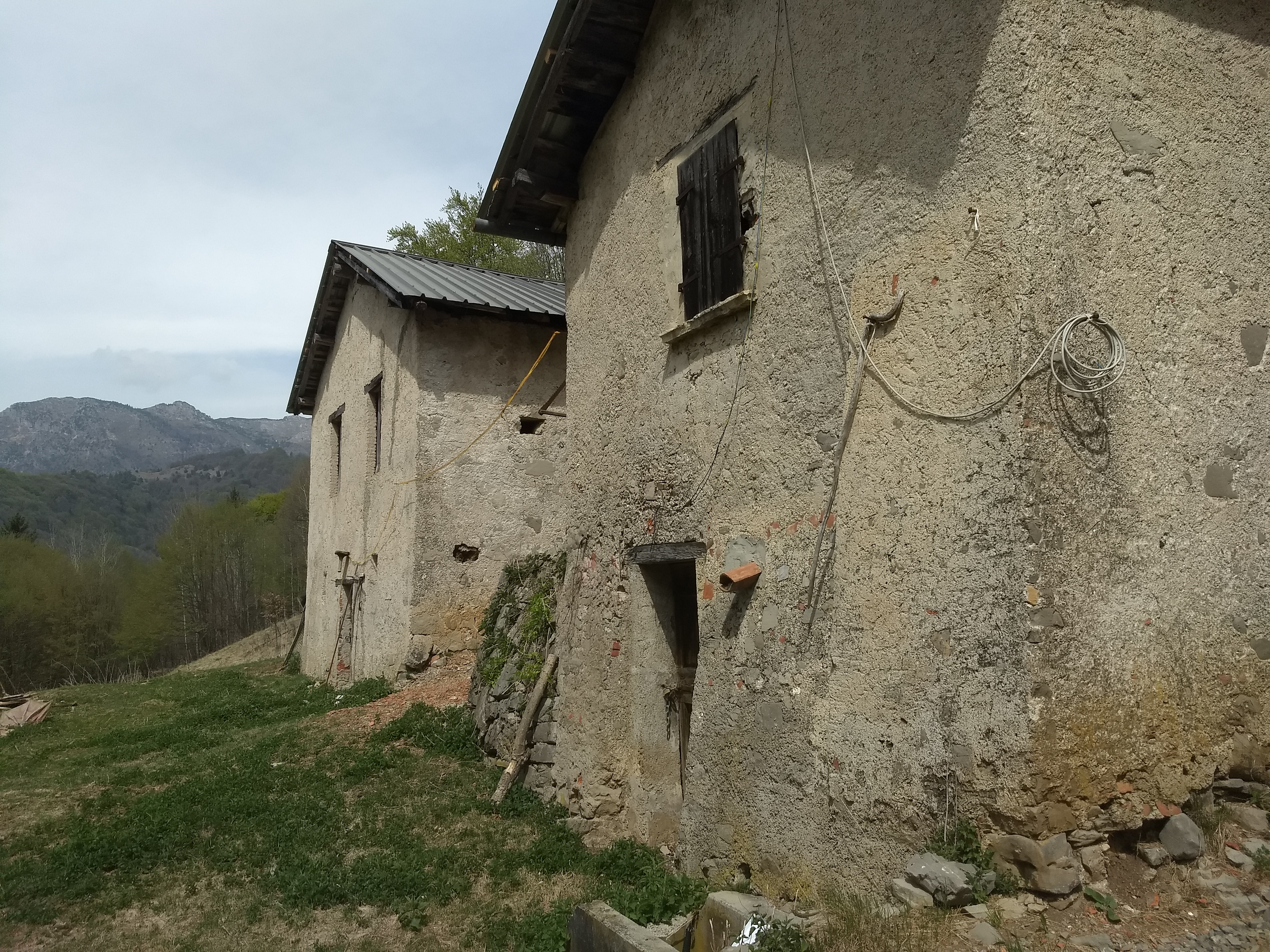
Mount Camiolo di Fondo, barn known as Massa dei Bernàrc

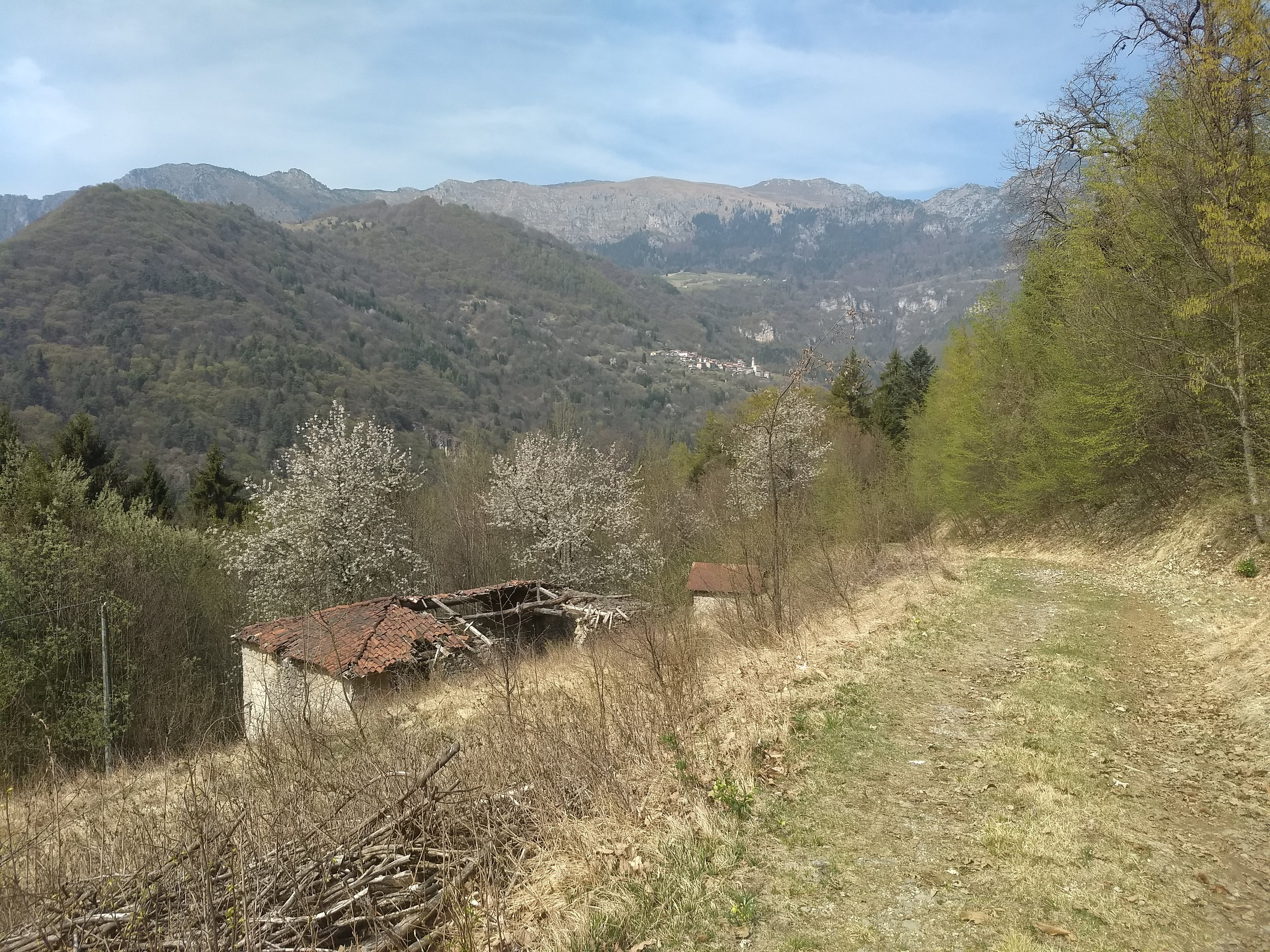
Mount Camiolo di Fondo, barn known as the Celi barn and Magasa in the background

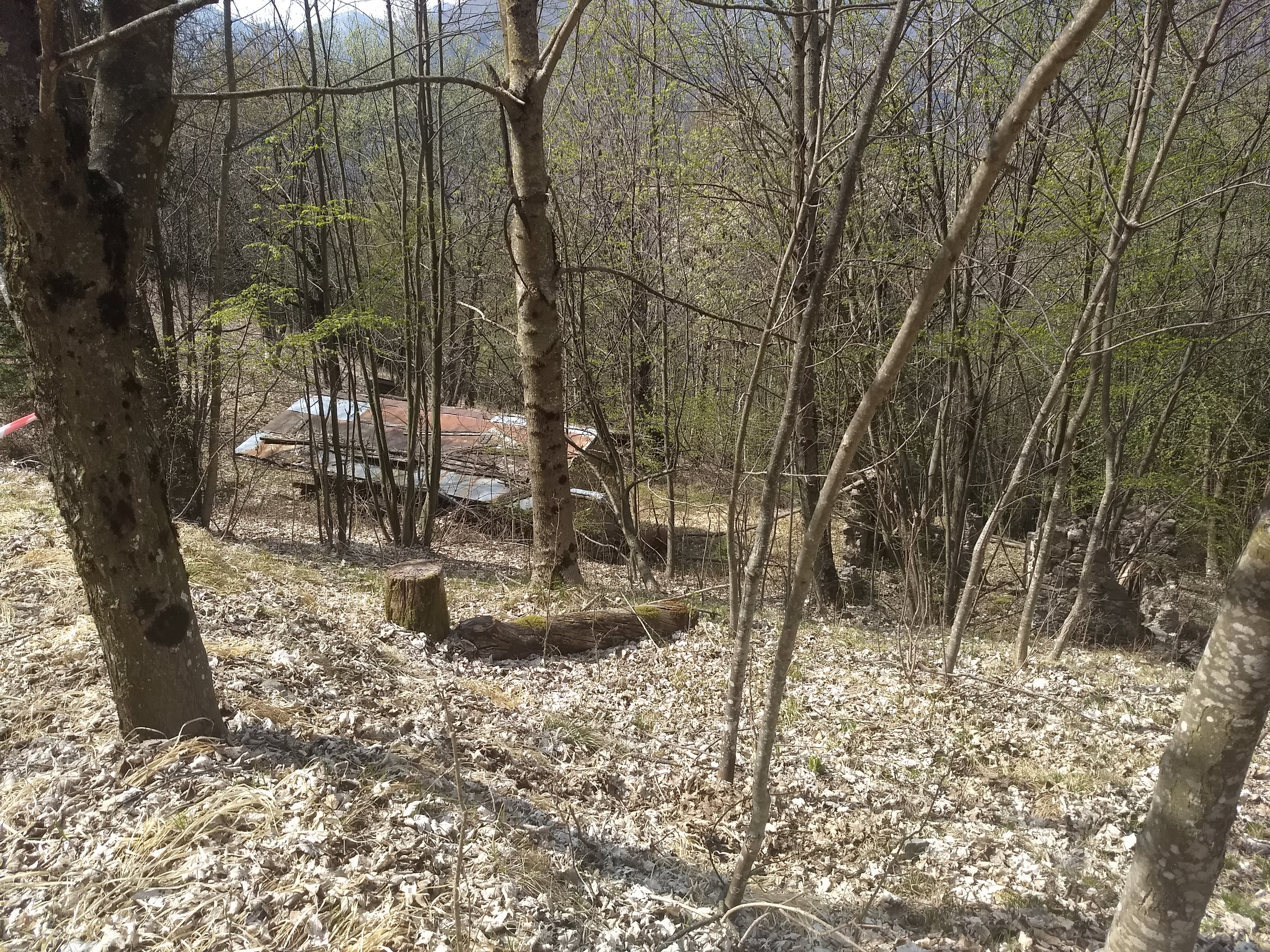
Mount Camiolo di Fondo, barn known as the Vianì barn.

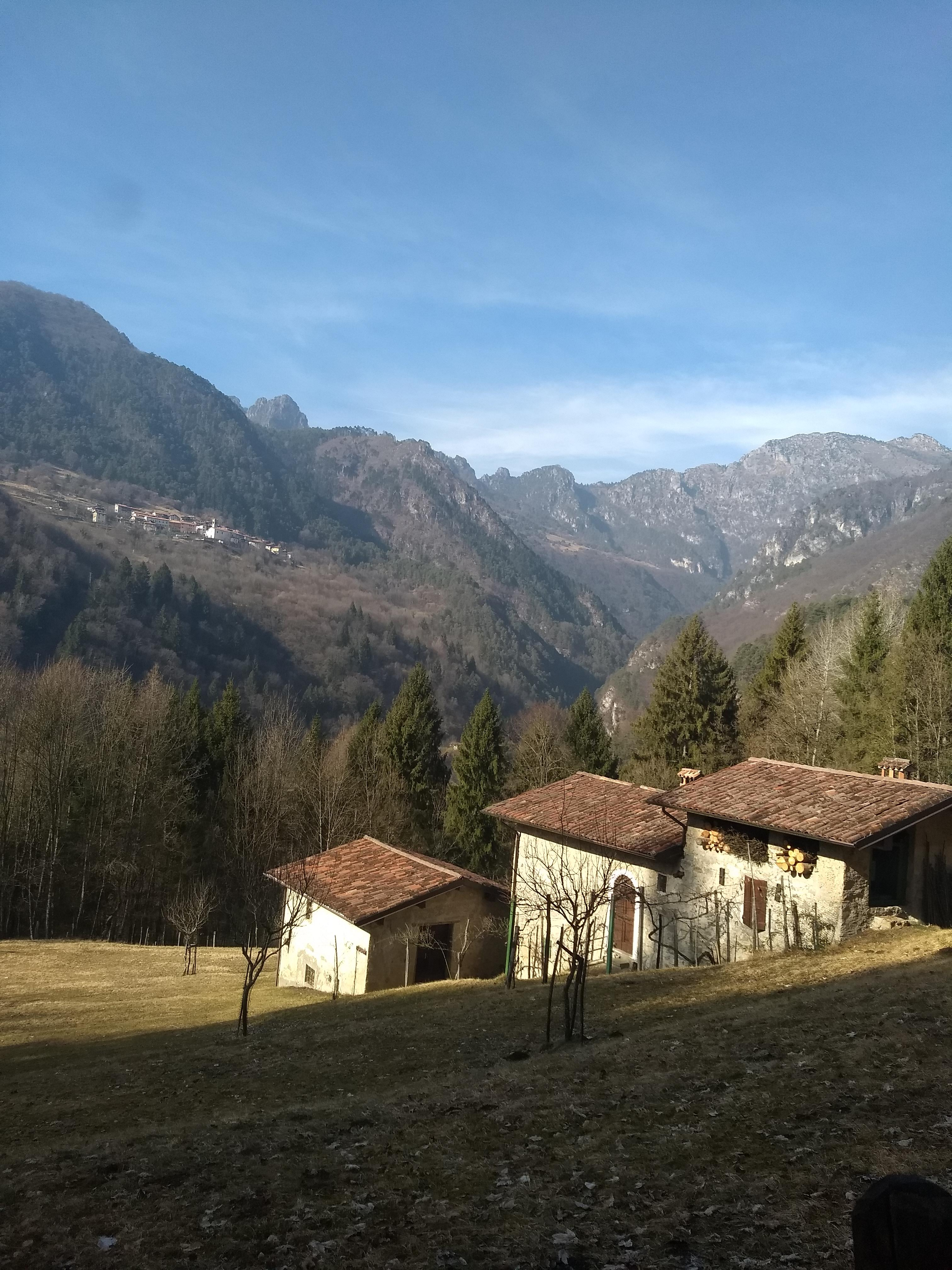
Mount Camiolo di Fondo, barn known as Mangana

== See also ==
- Brescia and Garda Prealps
- Monte Tombea
- Monte Manos

== Bibliography ==
- Parchi e aree protette in Italia. 2003.
- Bigazzi, Beppe; Bigazzi, Giuseppina. 365 Giorni di Buona Tavola.
- Società botanica italiana, ed. (1998). Informatore botanico italiano.
- Hauleitner, Franz (2005). Dolomiten- Höhenwege 8- 10.
- Kaul, W. (2001). Wandelgids Gardameer.
- L'Espresso. 2005.
- Touring club italiano, ed. (1970). Lombardia: eccetto Milano e laghi.
- Vittorio Bertarelli, Luigi (1925). Le tre Venézie.
- Museo tridentino di scienze naturali, ed. (1982). Studi trentini di scienze naturali: Acta geologica.
