= Monte Cingolo Rosso =

Mountain in Lombardy, Italy

- Cingol, Singol Ros, Shèngol
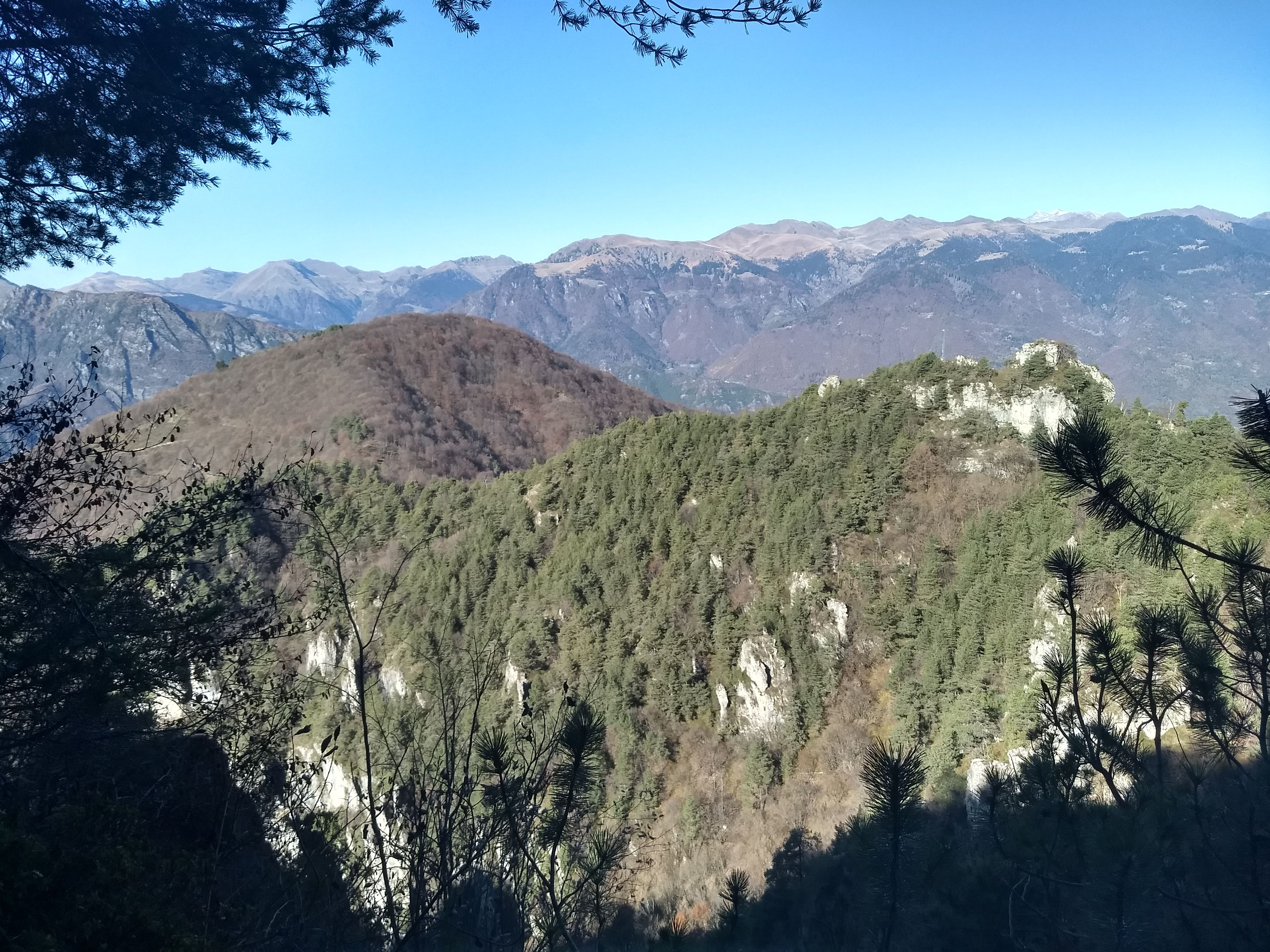
- On the left is Monte Calva, on the right is the summit of the Cingolo Rosso.

Highest point
- Elevation: 1,102 m (3,615 ft)
- Coordinates: 45°47′05″N 10°32′45″E

Geography
- Location within Italy
- Country: Italy
- Regions: Lombardy and Trentino-Alto Adige/Südtirol
- Provinces: Brescia and Trento
- Parent range: Brescia and Garda Prealps

Mount Cingolo Rosso is a mountain in the Brescia and Garda Prealps belonging to the Caplone-Tombea group, a subgroup of Mount Stino, and reaches an altitude of 1,102 metres.

== Physical geography ==
Located partly in the municipal territory of Valvestino, to which the southern slope belongs, and Bondone, with the summit and northern slope; it is part of the Alto Garda Bresciano Park and the Valle del Chiese. It is a historical place in that from about the year 1027, for centuries it marked the state border, such as from 1426 until 1797 between the Prince-Bishopric of Trent and the Republic of Venice, between the Kingdom of Italy and the Empire of Austria from 1859 to 1918; its southern slope is traversed by a mule track that connects Bondone with Moerna in the Vestino Valley, and through it in 1166 the Emperor Frederick I Barbarossa is said to have passed from Toscolano and in 1526 by Georg von Frundsberg from Germany. It was fortified in the Great War with trenches and a defensive military road.

The mountain consists of a wooded ledge connecting Mt. Calva with the south slopes of Mt. Bezplel-Cingla topped by a sharp rocky peak. The south slope, excluding the peak, belongs administratively to the municipality of Valvestino as does the neighboring Piombino Valley, and it represents an administrative anomaly in that it is configured as a Valvestino wedge in the Sabbia Valley, placed beyond the natural geographic division represented by the mountain ridge of Mt. Cingla and Mt. Stino.

== Origins of the name ==
The toponym would derive, according to some, from the Latin word cingulum meaning "belt" or "girdle" and would thus identify a strip of land bordering a cliff or ledge or even a grassy shelf between cliffs. The same meaning is given to Mount Cingla in Vobarno and the nearby one in Valvestino as well as Mount Zingla located further south. On the other hand, the name Rosso would derive from the reddish dolomitic rock caused by the presence of lichens and also because on sunny evenings, from summer to autumn, at the time of sunset, the phenomenon of alpenglow occurs, that is, the mountain takes on a reddish hue. There is further north, also in the Valle del Chiese, another mountain named Cingolo Rosso, 2,182 m high, in the former municipality of Condino in the Valle Aperta area.

The toponym is mentioned in the Atlas Tyrolensis by cartographer Peter Anich, printed in Vienna in 1774, which is the first detailed map of the County of Tyrol, and it first appears in a document in 1608 and consists of a report by the Venetian superintendent Giovanni Francesco Dolfin sent to the Venetian Senate.

== History ==
In ancient times, the Cingolo Rosso mule track, which ascends for about 9 kilometers from the built-up area of Bollone to Bocca Cocca, represented the main link in use among the people of the Vestino Valley to connect with the people of the Chiese Valley, to which it was administratively linked with the feud of the Lodron counts until 1802 and to the Austrian Empire until May 1915. To allow an agile and safe passage, the route was constantly maintained, refitted at various times to military needs and widened at their own expense by the valley communities. The history of the Vestino Valley made up of merchants, peasants, cavalrymen, charcoal burners, bandits of the 16th and 17th centuries, bishops or their delegates, postal pawns, German mercenaries on their way to the sack of Brescia in 1512, the armies of the Republic of Venice in 1516, and all those coming down from northern Europe and intending to avoid the bulwark of the Rocca d'Anfo, were either headed to the Po Valley or passing through it. According to chronicles, oral tradition and legends, in 1166 Emperor Frederick Barbarossa passed through there coming from the port of Toscolano and heading to Val Camonica, while in November 1526 it was traversed by some 20,000 Landsknechts under the command of Georg von Frundsberg, who, climbing from Bondone on Mount Calva, the Cingolo Rosso and Mount Stino, descended on the Venetian Capovalle, setting it on fire and then proceeding to the Po Valley.

In May 1528, according to the accounts of the Venetian chronicler Marin Sanudo, part of the 15,000 men commanded by Duke Henry V of Brunswick-Lüneburg from Germany and headed to the Duchy of Milan to support the Spanish governor Antonio de Leyva besieged by anti-imperial French and Church State troops transited there at the nearby Bocca di Valle.

On August 24, 1796 during Napoleon's invasion of Italy, about 80 French soldiers from the Storo encampment of General Pierre Sauret's division victorious after the Battle of Castiglione on August 5 against the Austrian army and advancing into Trentino, having reached Moerna via the Bocca Cocca mule track, descended, to the sound of drums and trumpet, to Turano imposing on the Valley representatives the payment of the "war tax" consisting of 2,000 Venetian liras in cash and another 3,000 liras in grain and livestock. In return, they issued passports to the public and private citizens to be able to "handily" bring into the Valley the merchandise and foodstuffs necessary for the sustenance of the population.

In the decade prior to 1840 the geographer and cartographer Attilio Zuccagni-Orlandini ascended from Bondone to Moerna and thus described the route, which remains its only known description: "Belonging to this District Judicature [of Condino] is the extreme southern tip of Trentino situated west of Benaco and called Valle Vestina, to which the Toscolano irrigates. It can be reached from Bondone, by a path that, passing by Mount Cingolo Rosso, leads to the summit of Stino and then to Moerna after about two hours of disastrous ascents and descents, and impractical except for pedestrians...".

=== The state border and Austro-Venetian boundary markers ===
In 1004, Trentino was raised to a county of the Holy Roman Empire by Emperor Henry II, and in 1027, Emperor Conrad II gave the county of Trent to Bishop Udalric II (1022-1055) and his successors. From then on the bishop of Trent also held the title of prince of the Holy Roman Empire and had both spiritual and temporal power in his hands. A few years later the lands of Val Vestino were again aggregated to Trentino along with the Ledro Valley, Riva del Garda, Vallagarina, the Giudicarie, Tignale, and Bagolino.

Within the principality, small subordinate entities were confirmed on estates of noble families, such as the Cles, Madruzzo, Lodron, and Castelbarco, but also different forms of organization such as the "Free commune of Storo," the "Seven parishes of the Giudicarie," the "Four Vicariates," which enjoyed a certain autonomy on the basis of recognized statutes, while also recognizing the higher authority of the Bishop and the Emperor of the Holy Roman Empire Nationis Germanicae, while the remaining part of the territory was subject to the direct rule of the Bishop. The first documented record of Val Vestino's belonging to the Lodron family dates back to June 4, 1189, when seven distinguished men of Storo made a pact among themselves to settle all disputes that might arise over possession for the castle of Lodrone and all the possessions that a certain Calapino owned in the parish of Condino and in Val Vestino. It is presumable that from that period the mountain became a border with the territory south of the Brescia area belonging to the parish of Idro.

From 1337 to 1426 it marked the border with the lordship of the Visconti, the Malatesta (from 1404), the Duchy of Milan and later with the Republic of Venice, when on August 21, 1752 as a result of the Treaty of Rovereto, concluded between the Empire of Austria and the Serenissima, its state borders were determined again with the placement in the following year, 1753, of 20 limestone memorial stones on the borders of the Vestino Valley. Of these, No. 9 and No. 10 were placed on the Cingolo Rosso, the former at Coca di Berardo toward Mount Calva near the military mule track at an elevation of 1,140 m., the latter on the western slopes of Mount Bezplel on a hump at an elevation of 1,200 m. These, after the fall of Venice in 1797, the Napoleonic and Austrian interlude concerning the occupation of Lombardy, would continue to determine the state boundary with the Kingdom of Italy from 1859 until 1918 and later the regional boundary with the Province of Trento until present times.

=== The legendary passage of Pope Alexander III in the Valley in 1166 ===
An ancient legend that arose in the late fifteenth century tells that in late 1166, precisely in the month of October, Pope Alexander III, an exile from Rome, supporter of the free communes, pressed by the imperials of Emperor Frederick I Barbarossa and challenged in his authority by four antipopes, passed through the mountains of Bresciano and the Vestino Valley. This tale has been insistently reported orally over the centuries by the local population and transcribed by historians, but considered by most of them to be lacking in conclusive and concordant evidence, among them Cipriano Gnesotti, a clergyman from Storo, in his "Memorie delle Giudicarie" of 1700. (Note: Cipriano Gnesotti in Memorie per servire alla storia delle Giudicarie disposte secondo l'ordine dei tempi, 1786 writes: "I do not take the passage for true, only report in its being what I find: and for the other passage through Val Sabbia, or Val di Vestino of Pope Alexander III, whose tradition reminds us of an inscription on the exterior wall of the parish church of Savallo in Val Sabbia, and in Val di Vestino it is rumored that that pope granted there the indulgence of the Pardon on the beautiful last Sunday of August. The truth I would rather believe was this: that falling on this last Sunday the Consecration of the Rectoral Church, in which at that time an indulgence is granted in order to call therein the people to celebrate the anniversary adoration, and it was called Pardon. Certainly the attendance is great, and greater was long ago, when the national militia attended. The Bull of Indulgence does not appear to have been lost, I believe, in the burning of the rectory of Turano.")

In Turano of Valvestino, the Feast of Forgiveness is reenacted on the last Sunday of the month, where every person having repented, confessed and visited the church of St. John the Baptist is completely forgiven of all sins; this ecclesiastical ceremony was instituted, according to tradition, by Pope Alexander III, grateful for the hospitality and protection of the valley dwellers, despite the fact that the Valley was of the Ghibelline faith and subject to the Lodron family, also of the imperial faith, before resuming his journey from Capovalle or Bocca Cocca-Cingolo Rosso. According to Attilio Mazza, it can be assumed that this Feast of Forgiveness is rather to be linked to the 1216 Pardon of Assisi, which is celebrated on August 2, while Cipriano Gnesotti speculates that: "falling on this last Sunday the Consecration of the Rectoral Church, in which at that time an indulgence is granted to call those commoners there to make the anniversary adoration, and it is called the Pardon. Certainly the attendance is great, and it was greater long ago, when the national militia attended it. The Bull of Indulgence does not appear to have been lost, I believe, in the burning of the rectory of Turano."

Chronicles mention Alexander III's passage through Val Sabbia and Val Trompia on a plaque placed on the wall of the church of Mura belonging to the former parish of Savallo, (Note: The text of the plaque reads: "Alex III papa a feder/imper vexatus ha transisse Fer. hanq/ plebem benedixisse / ut stia de sacello/ et fonte hic parum/ dissetate dicitura".) while on April 19, 1545 Msgr. Donato Savallo, rector of Marmentino and archpriest of the cathedral of Brescia, found the distinguished relics believed to have been donated by Pope Alexander III as he transited through Marmentino while fleeing from Emperor Frederick Barbarossa, and devoutly placed them under the high altar of the parish church of Saints Cosmas and Damian. The pope apparently gave the church a golden chasuble. (Note: The epigraphic record concerning a legend about the escape of Pope Alexander III in the time of Frederick Barbarossa, walled behind the high altar of the parish, reads as follows: HAS.SVB. ALTARE.RELIQVIAS / QVAS. VT. FERTVR. ALEX. PONT. MAX. / SEVITIAM. FEDERICI. IMPER.FVGIENS / HVIC.DONAVERAT.ECCLAE. NVNC. DONATVS / SAVALLVS. CIVI.BRIX.ET.HVIVS.RECTOR. / CVM.POPVLO.PSVIT.DEVOTISS. / P.KAL.MAII / MDXIV.)

=== 1166, the passage of Emperor Frederick I Barbarossa ===
An ancient oral tradition repeatedly reported over the centuries by historians, among them Cipriano Gnesotti in his "Memorie delle Giudicarie" of 1700, (Note: Cipriano Gnesotti in Memorie per servire alla storia delle Giudicarie disposte secondo l'ordine dei tempi, 1786, writes on pages 87 and 88: "The pass to Trent and Verona was not safe, having to cross the land of rebels," writes Muratori, who passed through Valcamonica and Brescia from Trent in 1166. A brave prince, and tolerant of exhaustion set himself on such a disastrous journey. Which road he took I cannot specify. It seems, that from the Adige to Garda, from Garda to Toscolano, Val di Vestino, Lodrone, or from Roveredo, Torbole, Limone, Tremosine, Tignale, land then annexed to the Principality, and bishop of Trent, Val di Vestino. I mention this because there is a tradition (if it is not a fabulous invention) that he came up through the Val di Vestino, and passing through Cingolo Rosso descended down into Lodrone, whose lords are constantly believed to have been fond of him, and thence in the streets of Bagolino and Crux Domini or Crusdomine to arrive in Valcamonica. Truly the tradition is claimed to be supported by some poorly engraved letters, and out of order from each other in boulders near the place so-called of the Scaletta, yet on the appurtenances of Bondone, on the roads of Cingolo Rosso where, at the height of a half man to stand on the road, they are recorded as AE, S, G, C, but as I said, out of order and line; in a short distance thereafter under the road are found on a term the divisions of the Communities, it is not known how he got on track, seeing himself along the Adige with difficulties in the journey undertaken, with a small army to hasten and stealthily intending to cross those mountains.") and in the secret reports of the Venetian superintendents of Salò sent to the Council of Ten in Venice in 1600, tells that in October 1166 the Emperor of Germany, Frederick I, descended into Italy with his own army consisting of about 10,000 men for the fourth time with the intention of wresting from the Eastern Emperor the base he maintained in central Italy and subjugating the rebellious cities to the Holy Roman Empire's policy. Having passed through Trento after travelling through the Adige Valley and given the impossibility of reaching Milan due to the hostility of the Veronese and the Castelbarco who had barricaded the Lagarina Valley with large forces, he conquered the Ghibelline castles of Rivoli and Appendice, as well as those of the cities of Brescia and Bergamo, and diverted to the eastern shore of Lake Garda, embarking his armies at Garda to the port of Toscolano. There, guided by the loyal Counts of Lodrone, Ghibelline feudal lords, he climbed the Toscolano Valley, reached the Vestino Valley, ascended from Turano to the Bocca Cocca and by the mule track of Mount Cingolo Rosso descended to Lodrone, whence by way of Bagolino and the Croce Domini Pass he passed into the Valcamonica at Breno and thus reached Milan in November. For some this passage, for others rather the one of Pope Alexander III which took place in the same year in November, would be remembered by certain letters engraved in stone near the place called Scaletta in the territory of Bondone near Mount Cingolo Rosso. Other historians, among them Ludovico Antonio Muratori, claim that from the Adige Valley Barbarossa returned to his path and headed for the Tonale Pass, then descending into Valcamonica. For Cipriano Gnesotti, the two facts are not in opposition to each other and indeed one can legitimately assume a short transit of the emperor passing through the Vestino Valley with only the escort of the Lodrons and a few units to reach Breno as soon as possible and in great secrecy, while the bulk of the army, given the impossibility of being ferried via the lake by the meager boats available, took a longer passage north into the Non Valley.

=== 1526, the passage of the commander Georg von Frundsberg ===
In July 1526, having quelled the peasants' revolt in Radstadt, Georg von Frundsberg, a 53-year-old commander, noble lord of the Mindelheim Castle in Bavaria, loyal subject of the Emperor of the Holy Roman Germanic Empire, Charles V of Habsburg, and sworn enemy of Pope Clement VII, hired a large number of Swabian, Frankish, Bavarian and Tyrolean mercenary infantrymen, in total about 14,000 men, 200 stone-cutter laborers specialized in settling rough tracks, 3,000 women as sutlers and 400 Burgundian transport horses, intending to descend into Italy to support his son Kasper who was under siege with his armies in Milan by French troops of the Holy League. At the head of his troops he placed his son Melchior, his brother-in-law Count Ludovico Lodron, Count Christopher of Eberstein, Alexander of Cleven, Nicholas of Fleckenstein, Albert of Freiberg, Conrad of Bemelberg, Nicholas Seidenstuker, John of Biberach and Sebastian Schertlin.

In October Frundsberg moved south over the Alps and quartered all troops between Merano and Bolzano where he was joined by another 4,500 infantrymen, who had left Cremona with Corradino di Clurnes. On Nov. 2 he held a council of war in Bolzano and in the following days headed for the city of Trent, where on Nov. 12 the army, consisting of 36 troops, moved ostensibly toward the Valsugana and Bassano del Grappa, and then headed, crossing the Buco di Vela, toward the valley of the Chiese, where it arrived at Lodrone on the 14th, pausing three days to await the arrival of all forces.

Frundsberg, lacking artillery (Note: The artillery had been left in Trent given the impossibility of transporting it to the mountains.) and unable to overcome in a single assault the Venetian defences of the Rocca d'Anfo, which blocked his way to the Po valley, advised by his brother-in-law Count Ludovico Lodron and Antonio Lodron, who knew the places inside out and had reliable guides, on the afternoon of the 15th, but not before ordering a diversionary manoeuvre of some divisions towards the Rocca d'Anfo, as if to suggest that he intended to pass by that way, climbed, apparently unseen by the Venetians but in fact spying on his every move, with the first 3,000 vanguards of his crew, with Count Lodron at their head, along the paths behind the castle of San Giovanni di Bondone, between steep gorges and cliffs, towards Bocca Cocca and over Mount Stino to Hano, territory of the Republic of Venice.

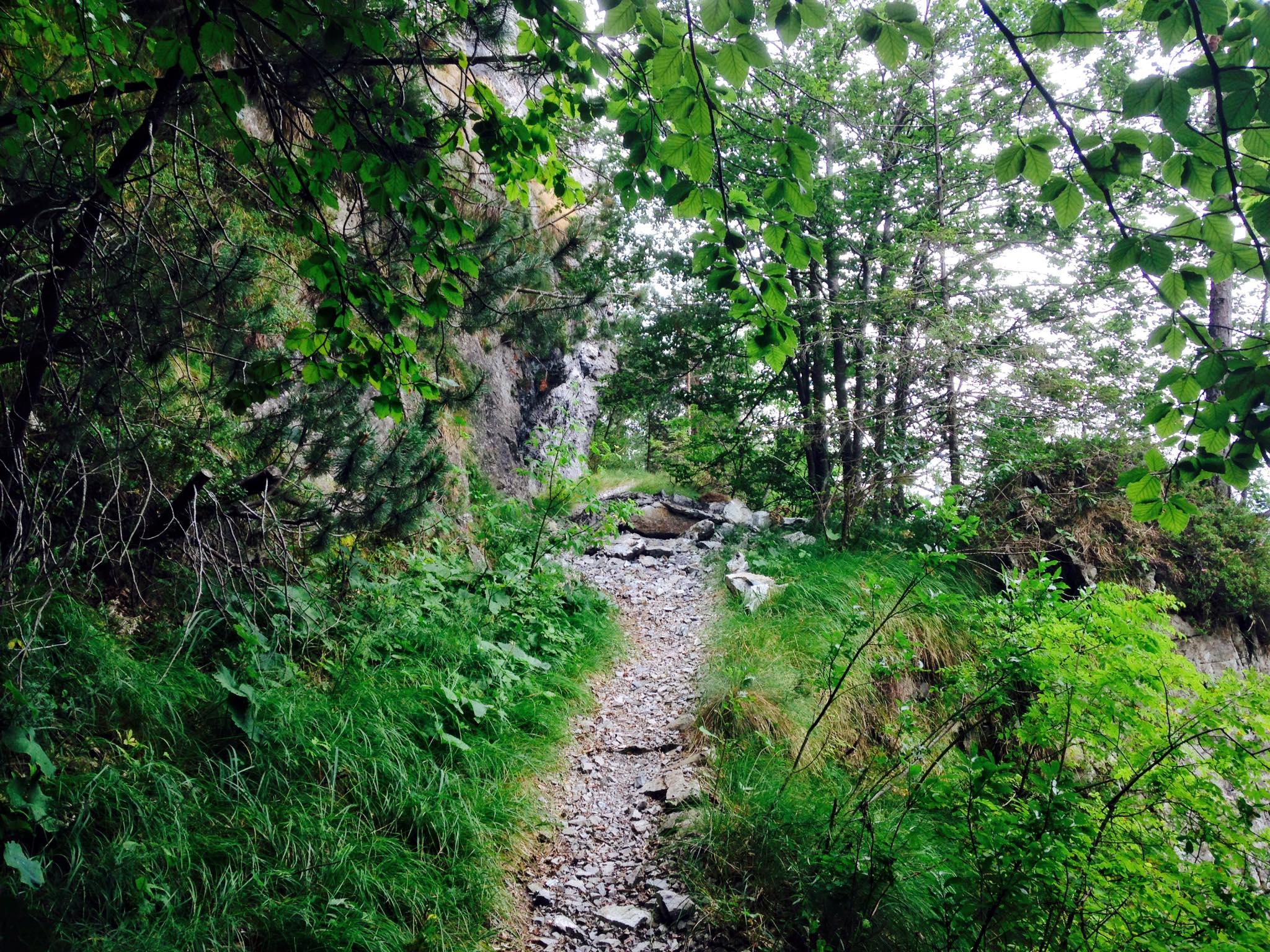
Glimpse of the "Calva Trail" in the Vestino Valley, now consisting of a former military mule track from the Great War

Frundsberg set out among the last of his Landsknechts only at dawn on the 17th, starting from the castle of San Giovanni di Bondone, followed by his trusted secretary and biographer Adam Reusner, who compiled a chronicle of the expedition. He walked wearily along the long rugged trail that through Mount Calva and Mount Cingolo Rosso reaches Bocca Cocca after about 9 kilometers and which, even today, is referred to as the "la Calva trail." In the valley of Piombino, in the municipal territory of Moerna, the chronicle tells that Frundsberg crossed a very challenging ravine often carried on the shoulders of his men. Throughout the journey two Landsknechts held their long halberds as a parapet protecting him from falling while others pulled him forward by his bodice and one behind pushed him. Men and horses tumbled into the gullies. Between the head and tail of the column there was thus more than two days' distance.

Some researchers still wonder today why Frundsberg, in order to reach the Po Valley, did not choose the easier route through the Bocca di Valle-Persone-Turano or Moerna to head for Hano, or descend down south into the Toscolano valley to Maderno instead of climbing along a route suitable only for chamois, wanted men or smugglers. A first hypothesis is provided by Professor Richard von Hartner-Seberich, claiming that the commander was forced to follow this route, the shortest way to reach the Po Valley, by Counts Ludovico and Antonio Lodron, feudal lords of the Vestino Valley. In fact, these were experienced old captains of fortune and well acquainted with the behavior of mercenary soldiers, and they surely wished to spare their trusted vassals of Val Vestino any violence or harm, while also protecting their interests. Seven months later, in May 1527, these same Landsknechts would be the perpetrators of the sack of Rome.

=== The Republic of Venice and the mountain passes of the Vestino Valley ===
The control and reporting of the Valvestino mountain passes that connected the imperial territories of the Valle del Chiese, a feud of the Counts of Lodrone, with those of the Venetian Republic of Salò, was always a constant concern of the Venetian officials of the Magnificent Homeland of Salò, aimed at monitoring possible passages of enemy armies, bandits, smugglers, spies, violators of the sanitary cordons due to the frequent epidemics in those centuries or people suspicious to the politics of the Serenissima. The first superintendent to sound the alarm about the safety of mountain passes across the Venetian border was in 1547 Marc'Antonio Morosini, who wrote to Venice pointing out, "...that they can from those foreign places pass through those parts; some part of its territory was taken over from that side where the Counts of Lodrone border...".

In 1608 the superintendent Giovanni Francesco Dolfin returned to the problem of the vigilance of the passes, mentioning the summit of the Cingolo Rosso where some time ago, in 1526, the Duke of Bourbon had transited "with the army of Todi" bound for the sack of Rome." (Note: The reference is wrong; in November 1526 the commander Georg von Frundsberg, not Charles III of Bourbon-Montpensier, passed through there.) He wrote that it "was a very difficult place to transit," but that nevertheless "those counts [of Lodrone] had ordered people to facilitate a road in the said Val Vestino for soldiers to pass, even though it was winter. Work on the road starting from Bondone and ending at Moerna had stopped because of snow but there were other mountain roads "and narrow passes that with very few people can easily be guarded." The work was in progress. Less alarmed about the political situation in Val Vestino seemed to be superintendent Giovanni Barbaro, who in 1614 reported to the Senate, "A little further in are the lords of Lodrone ... who have a valley named Val di Vestino, so conjoined with the coast that those people draw their living from the aforementioned coast, and although they are subject to the jurisdiction and command of others, they have, however, such an internal devotion to Your Serenity that they desire more to be called Venetian subjects than Lodrone's, and they lead their few incomes of little houses, of animals to sell all on the coast to draw then from that livestock for their living, as has been said."

Beginning in 1615, superintendent Marco Barbarigo reported "that it was not possible to exercise so much diligence unless someone always passed through those paths digging the mountains for the Val Vestino and with their own little boats ferrying the Lake Idro and again by land, entering the Val di Sabbio in the Brescian area to go on their journey."

In 1621, superintendent Melchior Zane described the three main passes in these areas that could be guarded by 400 armigers in case of incursions into the Riviera di Salò, namely, "...Count Hieronimo di Lodrone, patron of the Cingolo Rosso, a famous and ancient pass that leads into the Valle di Vestino and from there one passes by many roads into this Riviera... The Cingolo Rosso pass is situated above a mountain of the commune of Moerna, land of the Vestino Valley. From Bondone to the lock of this pass are five miles of arduous and rough path for laden horses... (Note: The reference is to the Bocca Cocca.) The other is Count Gerolamo di Conces also of the same counts of Lodrone and is a pass of greater repute, called Cocca di Valle (Note: Nowadays Bocca di Valle.) which with greater convenience also leads into the Valle di Vestino. The third one bordering it is the Ledro Valley in Trentino territory, which by four roads passes into the same Riviera." Superintendent Zane pointed out to the Council of Ten that these passes would need many soldiers to be promptly occupied and secured in case of hostilities with the Imperials by concentrating all forces on the Cingolo Rosso and Cocca di Valle, which could be patrolled "with only the people of the village," i.e., with local militia. On the other hand, in the event of an assault "the counts of Lodrone" and Girolamo specifically, would intervene with their "three hundred soldiers, equipped with arquebuses" to avoid losing the "Valley of Vestino, which has under it seven villas, namely Cadria, Magasa, Harem, (Note: Armo.) Persone, Moerna, Turà and Bolon, (Note: Turano and Bollone.) which one by one can make fifty fires (Note: Families.) for each." They also could concentrate other troops at the fortress of San Giovanni di Bondone "built not many years ago."

=== The passage of the Garibaldians in July 1866 ===
With the outbreak of the Third War of Independence between the Kingdom of Italy and the Austrian Empire on June 20, 1866, the Vestino Valley, in the present province of Brescia, but at the time under the Austrian Empire, found itself, because of the military penetration of Garibaldi's Italian Volunteer Corps along the route of the Valle del Chiese in order to reach the Adige Valley and conquer Trento, at the center of the military plans of both contending armies. In fact, the Austrians ascending from Bocca Cocca and Bocca di Valle occupied it with the intention of encircling the Rocca d'Anfo, while the Garibaldians used it as a transit to the Ledro Valley to lay siege to the Fort of Ampola. Regarding the taking of the fort this is what a Garibaldian belonging to Captain Bartolomeo Bezzi Castellini's 3rd Company of the 2nd Regiment of Italian Volunteers under the command of Lieutenant Colonel Pietro Spinazzi wrote on July 20 from Storo: "The fort of Ampola is ours; the telegraph has already told you so. It only remains for me to give you the details of the event, which marks, at least for my Company to which I belong, the brightest day of our campaign. It was now more than 15 days that we had been wandering from valley to valley, from peak to peak, believing ourselves to be reduced to the petty business of the finance guard, when suddenly an order, as desired as it was unexpected, came to us to rejoin the different companies of the 2nd, 3rd, 7th and 9th Regiments which were, as I wrote to you in my last one, staggered in the mountains dividing from Garda the Valle del Chiese and the adjacent ranges. (Note: The anonymous Garibaldian refers to the territory of the Vestino Valley.) This was a most strenuous march for us. Our path from Ponte del Colle (Note: Cola Bridge where the Valvestino Dam stands.) to Hano (Note: Capovalle.) was the riverbed traversed at night, (Note: It is the Toscolano stream.) then came the cliffs of Mount Stino, then the descent to a few miles from Storo (Note: The passage was through Bocca Cocca.) from which I am writing to you, and where we remained four days at the outposts suffering hunger and thirst and enduring fatigues to the point that the soldiers of the 59th and 60th never returned home. (Note: These were a contingent of regular Savoy army soldiers belonging to the two regiments of the "Catanzaro" Brigade that operated in Venetia.) Yesterday at noon the yellowish flag gave place to the white. From the heights where we were it was difficult to see the immense damage our guns had done to the fortress.... When the commander of the fort had presented the sword to our captain commanding the 3rd Company (who chivalrously returned it to the Austrian) we were allowed to descend into the valley...".

=== The Great War ===
On August 2, 1914, Austria declared war on Serbia, and the Italian Valvestino people, as subjects of the Austro-Hungarian Empire, were also called to arms. However, on May 24, 1915, Italy declared war on Austria, and Valvestino, left to its own devices by the Austrian military and gendarmes, was quickly occupied.

As soon as the Italian military took over, they took care to fortify the area. Over the next few months, 500 military and civilian workers under the orders of the officers of the Army Corps of Engineers began the work, which lasted until 1918 and formed the third line of rear defense. The Army Command had trenches equipped with latticework, shelters and other defense works dug from the crest of Mount Stino to Bocca Cocca, from the crest of Cingolo Rosso to Bocca di Valle and from this to the entire crest of Mount Tombea.

A Royal Financial Guard post in Moerna and one in Persone and two Carabinieri stations in Turano and Magasa were also established in the area. To connect the new garrisons, a series of roads were built: a roadway linking Idro with Capovalle, Moerna, Persone, Bocca Caplone, Bondone, and Lake Idro, and another that led from Moerna to Bocca Cocca on Mount Stino and continued to Mount Calva and Bondone; mule tracks that allowed people to pass from Capovalle to Mount Stino, Bocca Cocca, Bocca di Valle and from the meadows of Magasa to Puria and Tremosine. The Military Command also had work begun on a roadway between Toscolano and Molino di Bollone. However, the construction of the latter road, which could have been an important boost to the valley's economy, was entrusted to prisoners of war and was not completed. The need to build a new road system was also exploited by the Kingdom of Italy with political purposes aimed at making people forget the relative neglect in which the local populations had been kept until then by the Austro-Hungarian Empire. In this willingness already taken into account by the military authorities, politicians and local communities often intervened and pressured army engineers to reach one territory rather than another. In the construction of the road that was to connect Toscolano with Ponte Caffaro via Val Vestino, to supply the third line of armed defense of Magasa, Valvestino and Capovalle political interference was so pressing that in the end the military command called the local authorities to respect their roles and operated autonomously.

Conversely, a telephone line connected Capovalle and Storo. Militarily, the Vestino Valley during the war depended on a commander who resided on Mount Stino, while the civilian government was entrusted to a commissioner stationed in Storo. In the last year of the war, in 1918, there was a succession of unit rotations, from March 28 to April 4, the "Lario" Brigade moved to the area between Lake Idro and Lake Garda; the 233rd Infantry Regiment set aside in Capovalle, Moerna, Storo and Tremalzo; the 234th Infantry Regiment between Sarmerio and Vesio in Tremosine, minus the II Battalion, which moved to Anfo. In these localities the regiments briskly awaited work to reinforce and maintain the rear lines. On April 21 the II Battalion of the 234th Regiment was shelved at Gardòla. From the 23rd to the 27th, the brigade deployed to the Ledro Valley, and the "Lario" Brigade also assumed the defense of the "Passo di Nota" area. When the Great War ended, the region tied its fate to that of the Italian state permanently.

== See also ==
- Brescia and Garda Prealps
- Monte Caplone
- Monte Tombea

== Bibliography ==
- Camerini, Fausto (2004). Prealpi Bresciane.
