= Cima Rest =

Mountain in Italy

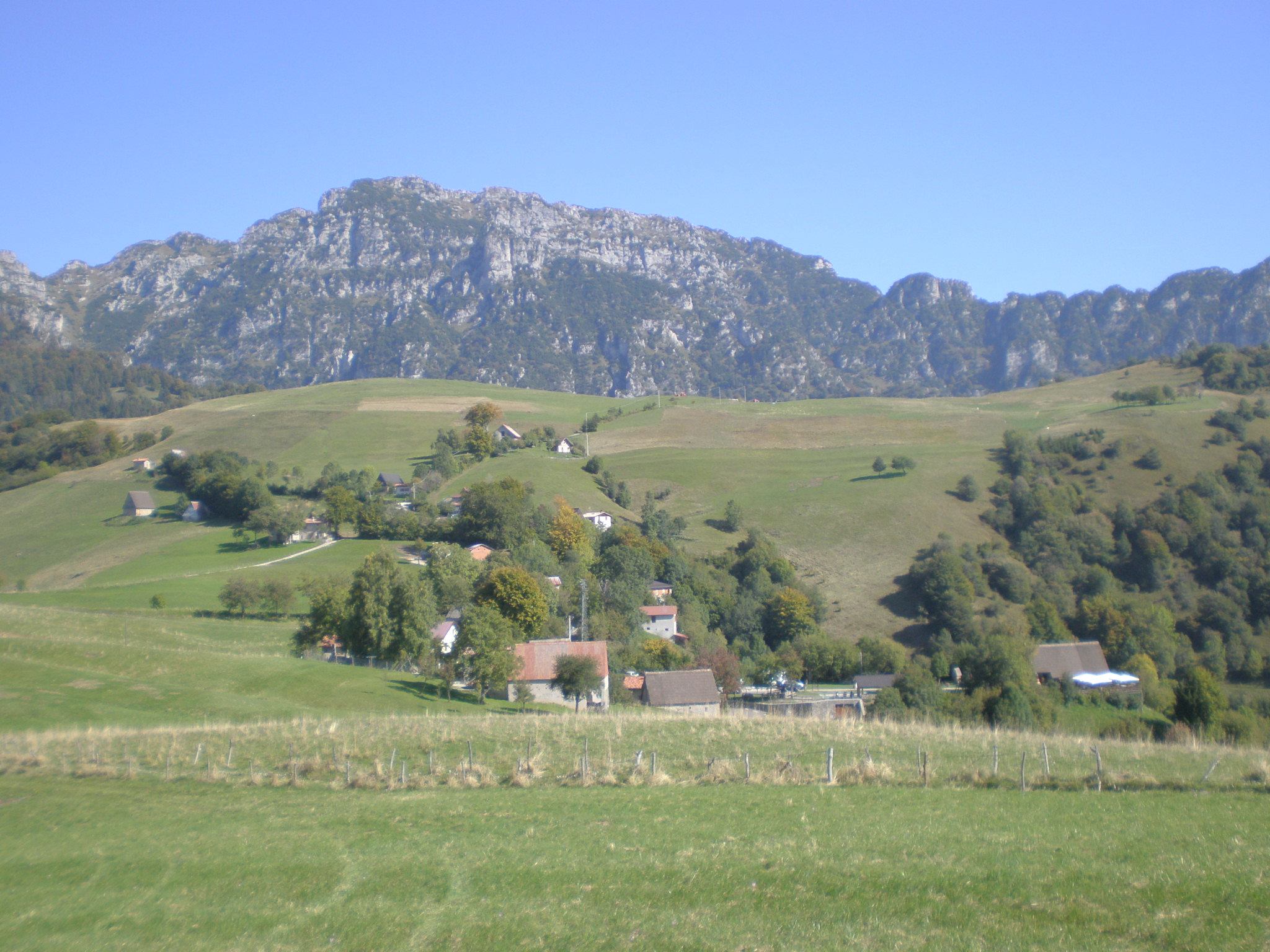
- Cima Rest and Monte Caplone in the background

Highest point
- Elevation: 1,257 m (4,124 ft)
- Coordinates: 45.779988°N 10.630615°E

Geography
- Location within Alps
- Location: Lombardy, Brescia, Italy
- Parent range: Brescia and Garda Prealps

Cima Rest is a plateau of the Brescia and Garda Prealps, in the municipal territory of Magasa within the Alto Garda Bresciano Park and the Tombea-Manos group and accessible from Magasa.

== Origin of the name ==
According to Arnaldo Gnaga in his "Vocabolario topografico-toponomastico della provincia di Brescia," published in 1939, the localities of Resto, a farmstead in the Puria Valley in Vesio di Tremosine, the barns of Resto in Valpegle at Eno, in Degagna di Vobarno and Restone at Edolo have the same origin related to the raising of livestock that remains in the pasture.

== History ==
The name of Cima Rest appears for the first time in the municipal statutes of Magasa in 1589 when it is mentioned in an article that forbade anyone from mowing forage in the appurtenances of the municipal pasture, while later community provisions stipulated that the religious service of the rogations from Magasa to Cadria should be carried out, with a stop at the barn of the Pieve di Cima Rest for the recitation of the rosary, the participation of the entire population being obligatory.

In 1633 a certain Gottardo Gottardi, known as Tavagnone or Tavagnù arranged in his will that upon his death the proceeds from the rent of his two barns at Cima Rest and Monte Denai should be spent on salt to be distributed to the population of Magasa.

In past centuries the plateau of Cima Rest was a strategic place in times of war, since in fact from there one could easily monitor any enemy movement along the Vestino Valley, between Monte Tombea and Bollone, and the wide plateau allowed the encampment of a large troop. Thus in February 1799, following the Napoleonic invasion of Italy, the Consular Magistrate of Trent instructed Captain Giuseppe de Betta to take a company of 120 Tyrolean bersaglieri to Magasa and via Cima Rest to Cadria to guard the southern borders of the Prince-Bishopric of Trent threatened by the French.

In July 1866 during the Third War of Independence it was climbed by the Garibaldian partisans of Colonel Pietro Spinazzi's 2nd Reggimento Volontari Italiani engaged in the siege of Fort d'Ampola, while in 1915, in World War I, it was first climbed and occupied by the 7th Bersaglieri Regiment and then fortified by the Royal Italian Army with the construction of the Tombea-Val Lorina carriage road, trenches and observation posts.

In June 1997, due to the kidnapping of Soffiantini, the entire Magasa area, and especially the barns of Cima Rest, was inspected by the Carabinieri Battalion of Brescia as it was considered a possible place of confinement of the entrepreneur from Manerbio.

== The early days of the Great War and the advance of the Italian Bersaglieri ==
Cima Gusaur and Cima Manga in Val Vestino had been part of the Austro-Hungarian Empire since the beginning of the Great War and were captured by Italian bersaglieri of the 7th Regiment on the first day of the conflict, May 24, 1915, under rain. In anticipation of the Kingdom of Italy's entry into the war against the Austro-Hungarian Empire, the Regiment was mobilized on the western Upper Garda, framed in the 6th Infantry Division of the III Army Corps and was composed of the 8th, 10th and 11th Battalions with orders to reach the front line in hostile territory Cima Gusaner (Cima Gusaur)-Cadria and then the Bocca di Cablone-Cima Tombea-Monte Caplone line to the north.

On May 20, the Regiment's three Battalions reached Liano and Costa di Gargnano, Gardola in Tignale and Passo Puria in Tremosine awaiting the order to advance to Val Vestino. On May 24, the bersaglieri advanced from Droane toward Bocca alla Croce on Mount Camiolo, Cima Gusaur and the village of Cadria, arranging themselves on the line from Mount Puria to Dosso da Crus via Monte Caplone, Bocca alla Croce and Cima Gusaur. On the same May 24, from Cadria, the commander Colonel Gianni Metello (Note: Colonel Gianni Metello commanded the Regiment from May 24 to July 30, 1915. Promoted to the rank of general in 1916, he was placed in command of the "Udine" Infantry Brigade; in April 1917 he was placed on temporary leave for six months in Naples due to illness not caused by service; he later assumed command of the "Jonio" Territorial Brigade. Metello was a native of Montecatini Terme, born in 1861. He participated in all campaigns from Adwa to East Africa. Decorated with a silver and bronze medals for military valor. He was among the founders of the National Association of Bersaglieri in the province of Pistoia in 1928 and as first president founded the Bersaglieri section of Montecatini Terme in 1934, becoming its honorary president until his death in East Africa in 1937.) reported to the Giudicarie Subsector Command that there was no trace, nor was it known, of any work being done in the valley by the enemy, whose troops had retreated to tactical positions beyond Val di Ledro. He highlighted that there was starvation in the area, lacking resources, with only old men, women and children. The following day they reached Cima Rest, Monte Caplone and Monte Tombea without encountering resistance. On May 27 they occupied further north Cima Spessa and Dosso dell'Orso, from where they could control the Val d'Ampola, and on June 2 Costone Santa Croce, Casetta Zecchini on Mount Calva, Monte Tremalzo and Bocchetta di Val Marza. On June 15 they deployed between Santa Croce, Casetta Zecchini, Corno Marogna and Passo Gattum; on July 1 between Malga Tremalzo, Corno Marogna, Bocchetta di Val Marza, Corno spesso, Malga Alta Val Schinchea and Costone Santa Croce. On Oct. 22 the 10th Battalion entered Bezzecca, Pieve di Ledro and Locca, while the 11th Battalion deployed on Monte Tremalzo. The last days of the Bersaglieri's presence on the Ledro Valley front were in 1916: between November 7 and 9, the battalions withdrew to Storo and from there to Vobarno and then continued by train to Cervignano del Friuli and their new destinations.

== Places of interest ==
=== The barns of Cima Rest ===
The barns of Cima Rest are rural buildings located on the plateau at an altitude of about 1300 m.

They are located in the middle of the alpine pasture and structured in such a way as to contain in a single building the basic functions for the life of the herdsman: on the lower floor the stable for the livestock, the house for the farmer, on the upper floor the storage for forage and outside the woodshed. Historical research, begun after World War II, dates this building type to the 7th century, attributing it to the traditions of the Goths or Lombards.

This building typology can still be found not only in Val Vestino but also in Piedmont in the Maritime Alps Park, between the Gùie basin and the Valle Gesso, precisely in Sant'Anna di Valdieri, located on the border with France. In fact, this area preserves archaic rural landscape features thanks to some baite built with rye thatched roofs placed at the foot of large rock outcrops.

== Culture ==
=== Valvestino Ethnographic Museum ===
The Valvestino Ethnographic Museum is located in Cima Rest and collects agricultural tools, utensils, and furnishings related to rural life.

== Nature ==
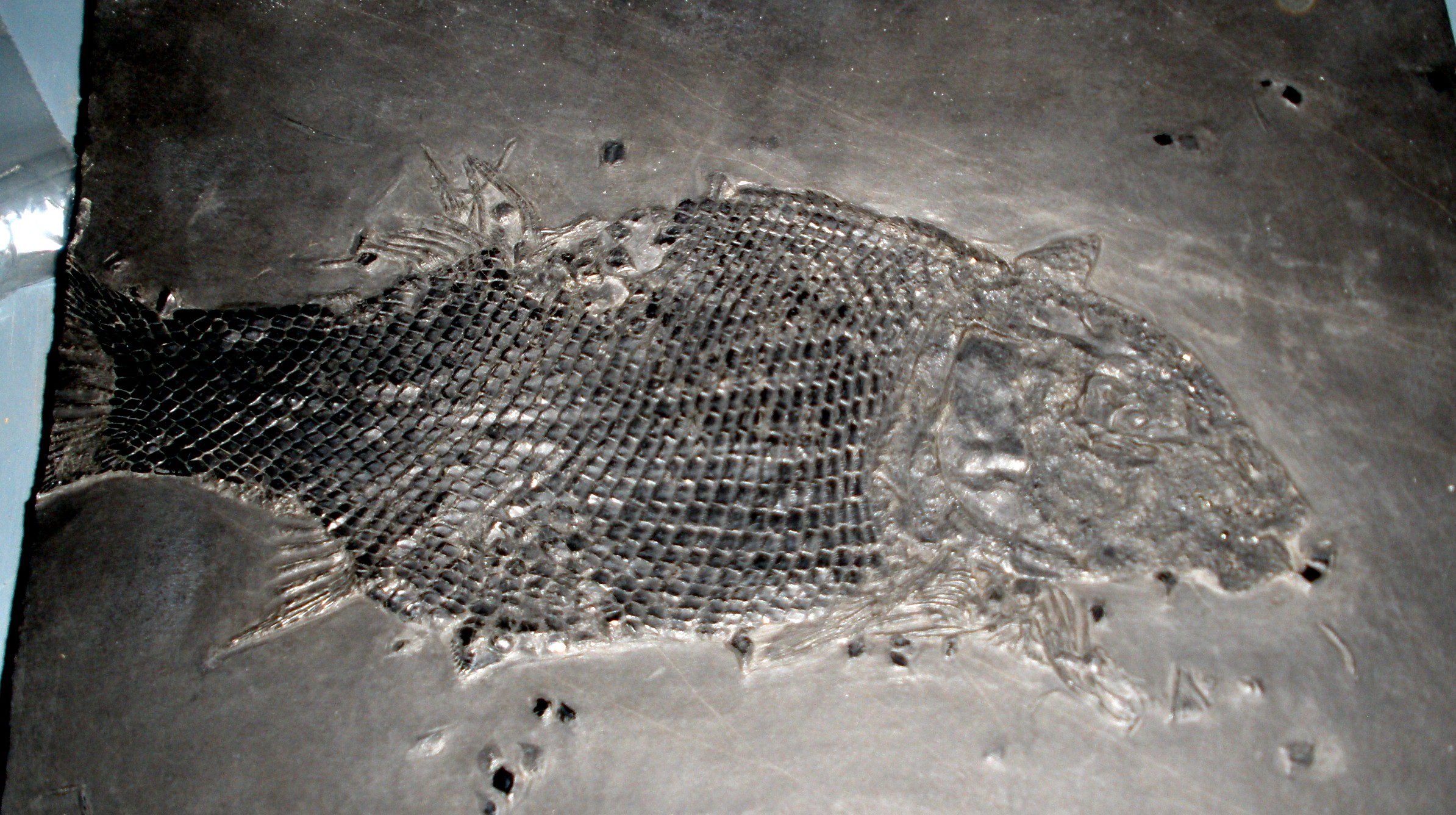
Paralepidotus

The area of the Cima Rest plateau, given its scientific importance, was herborized and investigated in its geological aspects beginning in the mid-19th century. No less impressive are its natural resources consisting of forests covering all the slopes.

=== The Cima Rest fossil deposit and the Paralepidotus ornatus from Malga Alvezza ===
In 1969, a surface fossil deposit of some scientific importance was discovered by researchers from the Brescia Civic Museum of Natural Sciences at Cima Rest, in the Alvezza locality, near the alpine pasture, part of a geologic formation, called the Zorzino Limestone, of Mesozoic age, dating from approximately 220 million years ago. The fossil fauna investigated consists of shrimp and fish that lived in ancient Mesozoic seas. Special features of these fossils are their preservation with their complete morphology highlighting anatomical details. Prominent among the various findings is the discovery in sediments of the Norian age of a Paralepidotus ornatus, a fossil fish specimen 600 millimeters long now preserved at the Brescia Civic Museum of Natural Sciences and dating precisely to the Norian stage, i.e., the Triassic period between 226 and 210 million years ago. Paralepidotus was a slow-moving fish, equipped with strong ganoid scales to defend itself from attackers equipped with teeth, lived near the seabed and fed mainly on mollusks.

Researcher Fulvio Schiavone writes: "The first to be discovered in the late 1960s were holostean fishes belonging to the genera Paralepidotus and Pholidophorus, but later remains of flying fishes and single teeth detached from the jaws of predatory fishes, such as the genus Birgeria, were also identified. Also common are the jaws of Pseudodalatias, a cartilaginous fish, of which only the small jaw equipped with pointed teeth is known because it is bony in nature. Shrimps of the genera Antrimpos, Archeopalinurus, (Note: Archaeopalinurus is a genus of crustacean similar to present-day shrimp.) Acanthinopus (Note: Acanthinopus is an extinct species of shrimp. Acanthinopus gibbosus has been found in Norian (Upper Triassic) settlements of the Zorzino Limestone in northern Italy.) and (Palaeo)dusa have also been found. Of interest are the Thylacocephala, arthropods recently discovered taxonomically in the Besano fossiliferous deposit, which lived undisturbed in the asphyxial seabed feeding on the remains of dead animals that had fallen down into the seabed. Among other novelties, problematic remains were also found that may correspond to the wing of a flying reptile of the Triassic and Jurassic rhamphorhynchus group."

Other finds extracted from the rocks of Crune, a locality located near the Alvezza alpine pasture, between 1999 and 2006, consist of small fish, usually no larger than 11 centimeters, belonging to the group of Pholidophoriformes, better known as pholidophoridae. These small fish played an important role in the ecological chains of the ancient Triassic seas, as they were a source of food for all predatory fish. Apart from the Vestino Valley area, pholidophorids had previously been found only in a few other Italian and European localities: such as at Cene (Bergamo), Ponte Giurino (Bergamo) and Seefeld in Tirol (Austria).

In fact, the presence of these fossils had already been detected in the last decades of the 1800s by the German geologist Karl Richard Lepsius. In the second half of the 19th century the Austrian Empire planned and financed within the Geologische Reichanstalt geological studies and research in southern Tyrol and Trentino in parallel with topographical surveys and the first cadastral maps. Between 1875 and 1878 Karl Richard Lepsius carried out careful stratographic research, devoting several pages of his book to the geology of the Ledro Alps and the mountains south of Ampola with detailed studies of the upper dolomite of Alpo di Bondone, Valle Lorina, Val Vestino, and Monte Caplone. In his publication "Western South Tyrol," published in Berlin in 1878, Lepsius wrote: "The greater part of the Vestino Valley consists of main dolomites, the wild gorges of which are difficult to penetrate; on it lie the Rhaetian strata, severely faulted and pierced by the rigid dolomites. The irregular formation makes it difficult always to separate the lilodendron limestone (Note: Fossil wood.) and dolomite from the underlying main dolomite; for the contorta-mergel are mostly discarded and crushed, and carried away by water on the dolomites. The broad plateau above Magasa, on which fresh green meadows and shrubs extend, we immediately recognize as Rhaetian in contrast to the rugged and almost completely barren dolomites: numerous blocks of lilodendrons, Terebratula gregaria, Aviceln, and Modiole immediately confirm our hypothesis; next to that, contorta-thone clays have been wrested from the water, in which we find the same Avicula contorta, Cyrena rhaetica, Cerithium hemes, Leda percaudata, Austrian Cardita (Note: Cardita is a genus of marine bivalve mollusks in the family Carditidae.) and others. Large quantities of fossils characteristic of these strata have been found. The strata descend from Caplone Pass to the south; the lilodendron limestones collapsed on the lower clays and were thrown south on the main dolomites. Houses on the upper meadows (Note: Monte Denai and Cima Rest.) are built with black lilodendron limestone. Toward the settlement of Magasa one descends on lilodendron limestone, an alternation of gray and black limestone, gray dolomite limestone, and white dolomite limestone. Below it lies, not very thick, impaled between jagged main dolomites, the contorta-mergel. From Magasa, head west across the plateau to Bondone and into the valley of the Chiese."

=== Astronomical Observatory ===
There is also an astronomic observatory on the plateau, active since 1997.

== See also ==
- Magasa, Lombardy
- Brescia and Garda Prealps
- Monte Tombea
- Monte Manos

== Bibliography ==
- D'Aversa, A. (1973). "Forme biologiche non sicuramente identificabili e strutture inorganiche secondarie non comuni ai Prati di Rest nell'Alta Valvestino". Natura Bresciana. 10. Brescia: 76–90.
- Parchi e aree protette in Italia. 2003.
- Bigazzi, Beppe; Bigazzi, Giuseppina. 365 Giorni di Buona Tavola.
- Società botanica italiana, ed. (1998). Informatore botanico italiano.
- Hauleitner, Franz (2005). Dolomiten- Höhenwege. pp. 8–10.
- Kaul, W. (2001). Wandelgids Gardameer.
- Jud, Jakob; Steiger, Arnald (2004). Vox romanica.
- L'Espresso. 2005.
- Camerini, Fausto (2004). Prealpi Bresciane.
- Touring club italiano, ed. (1970). Lombardia: eccetto Milano e laghi.
- Vittorio Bertarelli, Luigi (1925). Le tre Venézie.
- Museo tridentino di scienze naturali, ed. (1982). Studi trentini di scienze naturali: Acta geologica.
- Gnaga, Arnaldo (1939). Vocabolario topografico-toponomastico della provincia di Brescia.
