= Alto Garda Bresciano Regional Park =

Nature reserve in Lombardy, Italy

Parco regionale dell'Alto Garda Bresciano
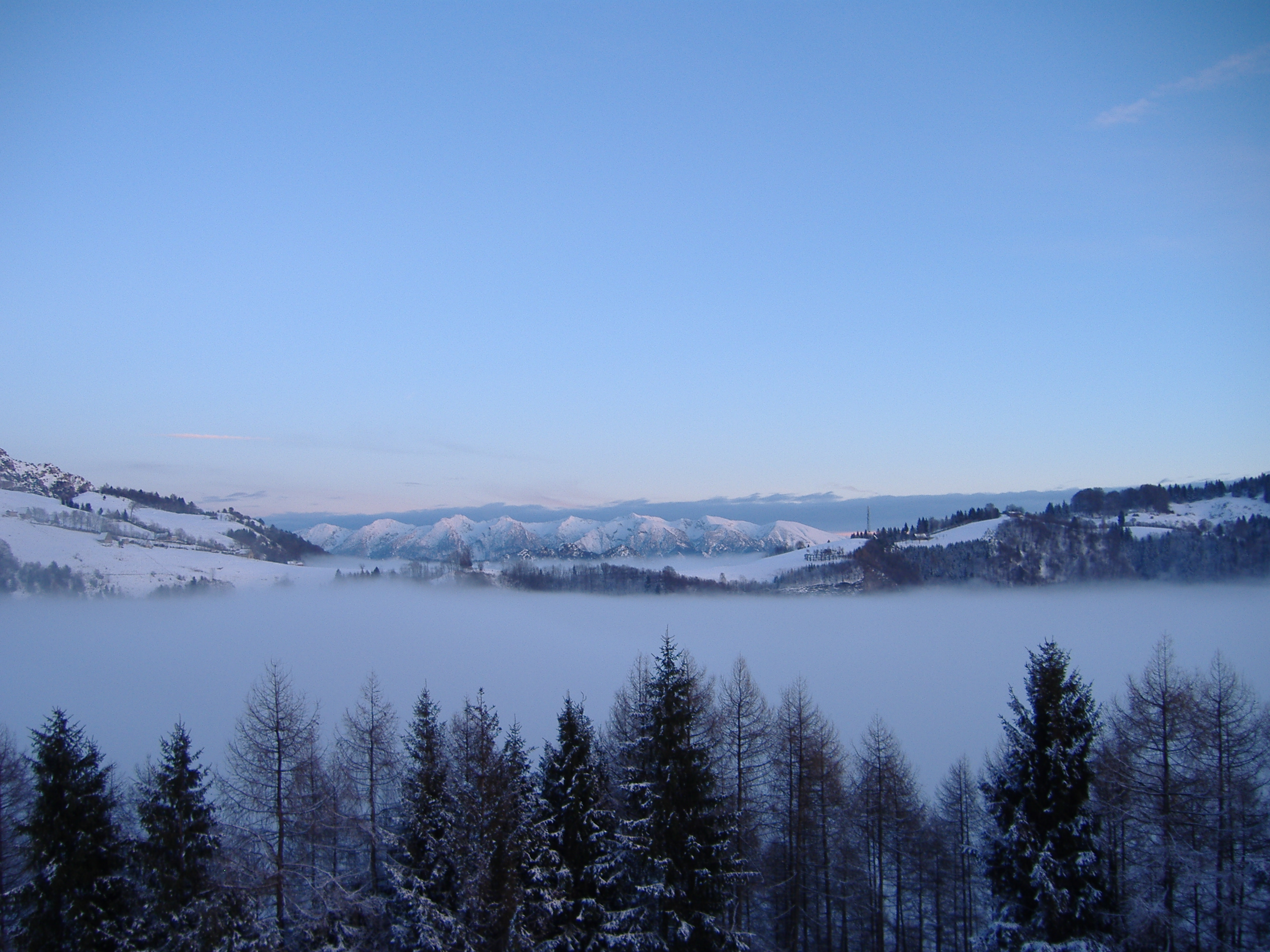
- Interactive map of Parco regionale dell'Alto Garda Bresciano
- Location: Lombardy, Italy
- Coordinates: 45°44′N 10°38′E
- Area: 38,269 ha (94,560 acres)
- Established: 1989
- Website: cm-parcoaltogarda.bs.it

The Alto Garda Bresciano Regional Park (Italian: Parco regionale dell'Alto Garda Bresciano) is a nature reserve in Lombardy, Italy. Established in 1989, it covers the western coast of Lake Garda between Salò and Limone sul Garda (Riviera dei Limoni), the Valle Sabbia and the mountains between the lake and the border with Trentino. The highest point is the peak of Monte Caplone, 1,976 meters above sea level, whereas the lowest point is the lake, 65 meters above sea level.

The park covers part of the territory of nine municipalities, all in the Province of Brescia. It has a varied environment, with the coastal region of Lake Garda enjoying sub-Mediterranean climate and the mountainous part being characterized by Alpine climate. About half of the park's territory is covered by woods, with species including oaks, beeches, European hornbeams, mountain pines, Scotch pines and Norway spruces; the largest state forest in Lombardy, with an area of 11,000 acres, is located inside the park.

About 250 animal species live in the park, including red deer, roe deer, chamoises, muflons, alpine ibexes, wild boars, brown bears and golden eagles.

The park includes the natural reserve of the Valle di Bondo, created in 1985 and with an area of 76 hectares (in the territory of Tremosine), and the Val di Vesta Wilderness Area, established in 1998 with an area of 1,525 hectares (in the territory of Gargnano).

== See also ==
- Monte Tavagnone
