= Magasa, Lombardy =

Magasa Magàza (Lombard)
- Comune
- Comune di Magasa
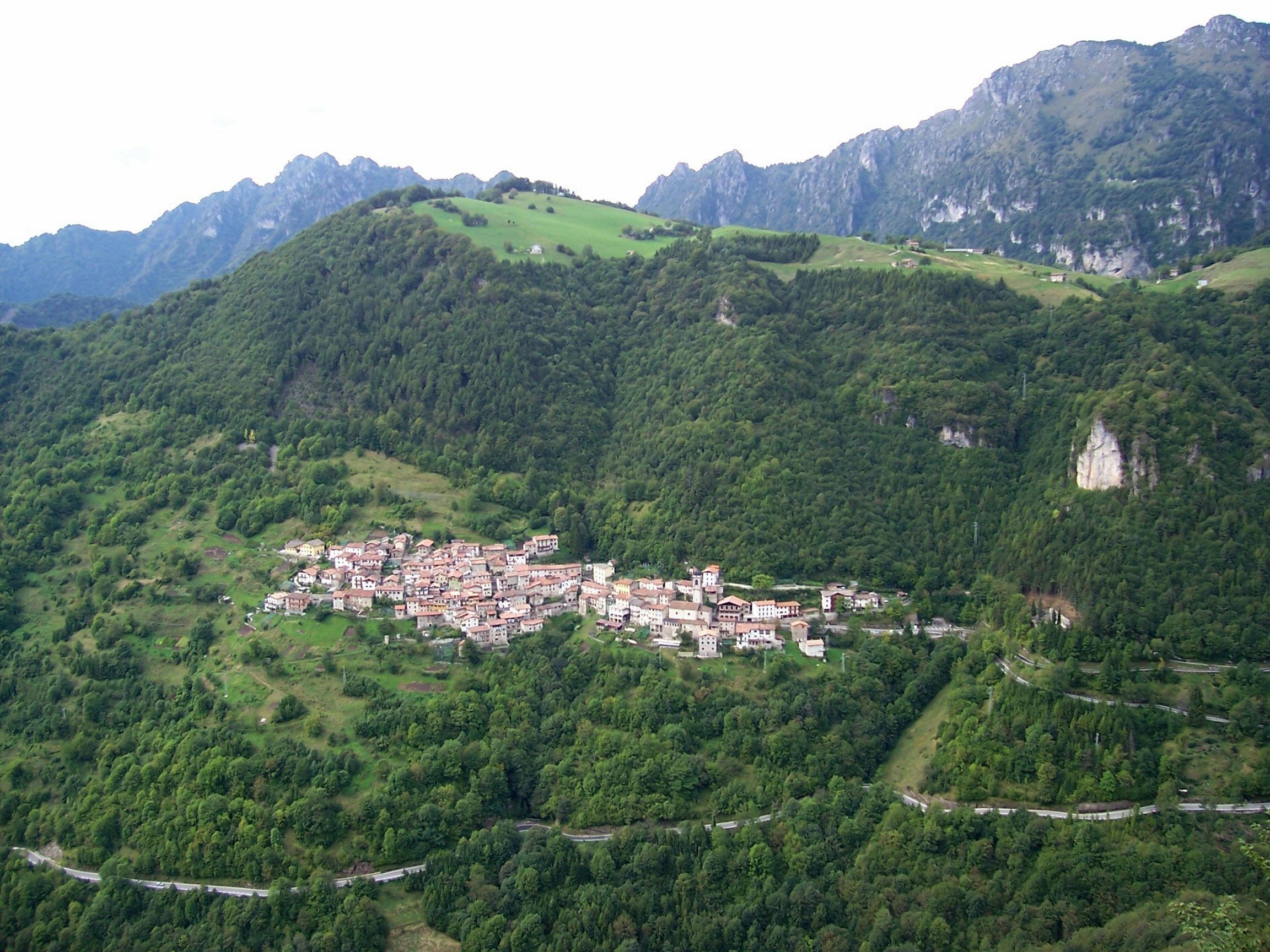
- View of Magasa

- Location within Italy Location within Lombardy
- Coordinates: 45°46′55″N 10°36′59″E
- Country: Italy
- Region: Lombardy
- Province: Brescia (BS)
- Frazioni: Cadria, Cima Rest

Government
  - Mayor: Omar Venturini (Lista Civica)

Area
  - Total: 19.11 km^{2} (7.38 sq mi)
- Elevation: 978 m (3,209 ft)

Population (2026)
  - Total: 104
  - Density: 5.44/km^{2} (14.1/sq mi)
- Demonym: Magasini
- Time zone: UTC+1 (CET)
  - Summer (DST): UTC+2 (CEST)
- Postal code: 25080
- Dialing code: 0365
- Patron saint: Sant'Antonio Abate
- Saint day: 17 Gennaio
- Website: Official website

Magasa (Lombard: Magàza) is a village and comune (municipality) in the province of Brescia in the region of Lombardy in northern Italy, located about 110 kilometres (68 mi) northeast of Milan and about 40 kilometres (25 mi) northwest of Brescia. It has 104 inhabitants.

The abundance of pastures has always been significant for the village economy. Dedicated to cattle raising which survives still today in summer mountain barns with production of milk, from which famous cheeses and butter are obtained. The historical core is a crossing of small passages with peasants' high and narrow houses.

Magasa borders the municipalities of Bondone, Ledro, Tignale, Tremosine sul Garda, and Valvestino.

== History ==
Magasa's origins go back to the Celtics; they called the place mag, the field. The Stoni and the Gallic Cenomani, then the Romans and the Lombards lived here. The Lodrone family established in Magasa from 1200 to 1807. It became part of Italy in 1919. Magasa was separated from Trentino in 1934, and became a hamlet of Turano.

The ancient administrative autonomy of 1589, was achieved again in 1947.

== Demographics ==
As of 2026, the population is 104, of which 58.7% are male, and 41.3% are female. Minors make up 1.0% of the population (the lowest share out of all Italian municipalities), and seniors make up 48.1%.

Historical population

Year	Pop.	±%
1861	-	—
1871	-	—
1881	-	—
1901	-	—
1911	-	—
1921	472	—
1931	477	+1.1%
1936	456	−4.4%

Year	Pop.	±%
1951	488	+7.0%
1961	464	−4.9%
1971	408	−12.1%
1981	344	−15.7%
1991	238	−30.8%
2001	189	−20.6%
2011	145	−23.3%
2021	107	−26.2%

Source: ISTAT

=== Immigration ===
As of 2025, immigrants make up 2.0% of the population. The foreign countries of birth are Germany and Switzerland.

== Administration ==
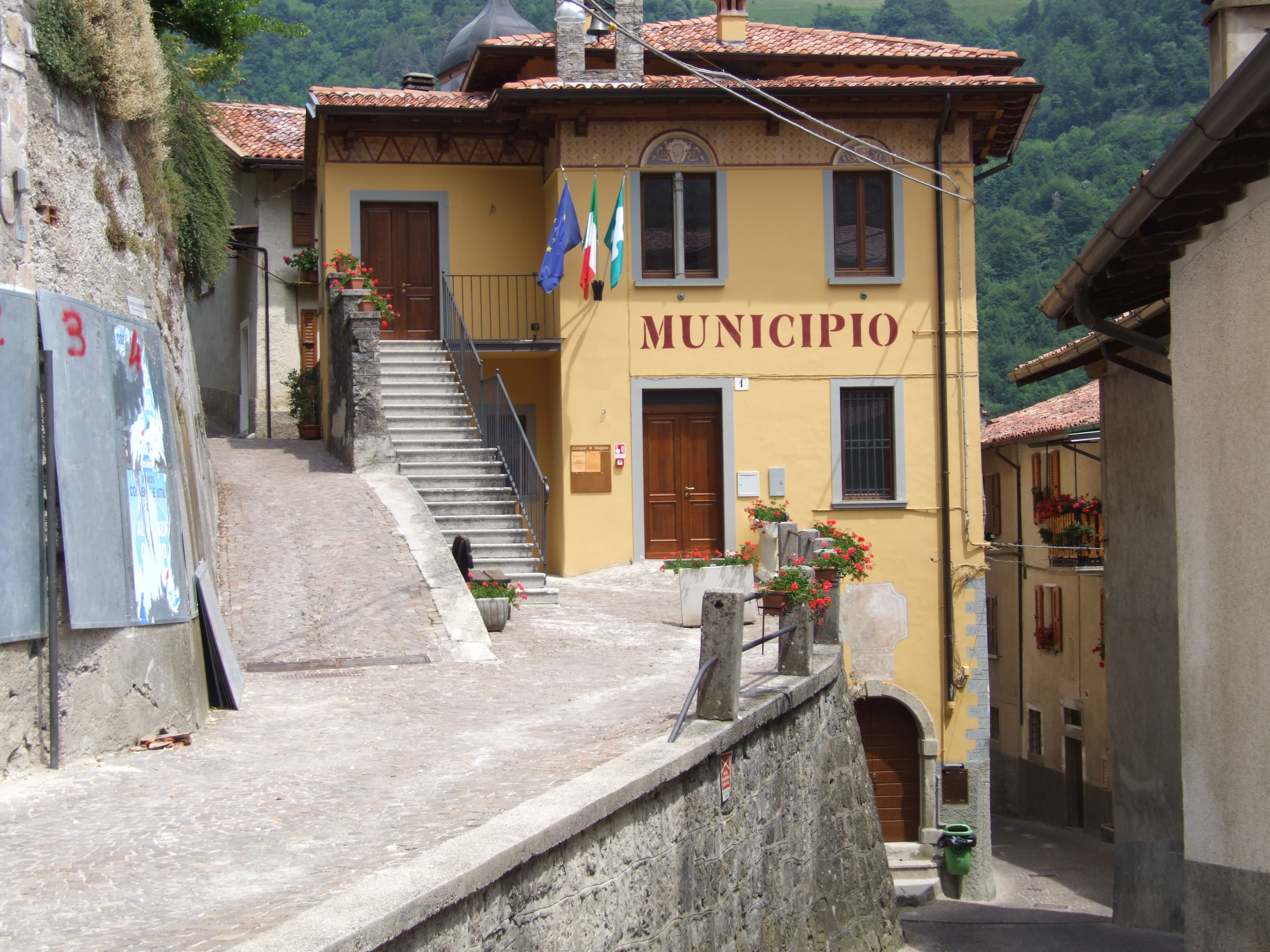
Municipality of Magasa

Mayors of Magasa since 1948:

Mayor	Start of term	End of term	Party
Giuseppe Zeni	1948	1960	Civic list
Angelo Gamba	1960	1964	Civic list
Andrea De Rossi	1964	1965	-
Fioravante Gottardi	1965	1972	Civic list
Dino Venturini	1972	1975	Civic list
Antonio Zeni	1975	1980	Civic list
Evaristo Venturini	1980	1991	Civic list
Giorgio Venturini	1991	1999	Civic list
Zaira Romano	1999	2000	-
Ermenegildo Venturini	2000	2010	Civic list
Federico Venturini	2010	2026	Civic list
Omar Venturini	2026	Incumbent	Civic list

== Culture ==
Magasa's church is dedicated to Sant'Antonio Abate, mid 18th century. Inside, the religious building is characterized by the floor in red and yellow stones from the Denervo mountain. The church, of allegedly of Lombards' origins, was restored in 1547 and is the pilgrimage arrival on occasion of the patron's day, 10 August. An ancient ritual is renewed, instituted by testament in 1588, with the distribution to every participant to the religious celebration of one piece of bread and fifth of wine.

Today, the village of Magasa is the owner of the church and it is morally engaged to comply with the original benefactor's desire to renew the tradition. The bright sky of Cima Rest, free from any pollution, has allowed the association Astrofili di Salò to arrange an Astronomical public observatory.

=== Traditions ===
- Feast of Alpine troops in August;
- Feast of the cheese in Cima Rest in September.

== The haylofts of Cima Rest ==
The waterproof straw-roofed haylofts of plateau Denai and Cima Rest — the latter of which contains the Ethnographic Museum of the Valvestino — are mentioned for the first time in a document dated 1613. Some historians have established a link between their constructive type and some low Middle Age constructions; others say that Lombards from Hungary built them in 600 AD.

== See also ==
- Cima Rest
- Monte Camiolo

== Bibliography ==
- (in Italian) Bruno Festa, Boschi, fienili e malghe - Magasa tra il XVI e il XX secolo, Grafo edizioni, Brescia 1998;
- (in Italian) Nicola Gallinaro ed Elio Della Ferrera, Terra tra due laghi, Consorzio Forestale della Valvestino, Sondrio 2004;
- (in Italian) Gianpaolo Zeni, "En Merica!" - L'emigrazione della gente di Magasa e Val Vestino in America, Comune e Biblioteca di Magasa, Bagnolo Mella 2005;
- (in Italian) Gianpaolo Zeni, La guerra delle Sette Settimane. La campagna garibaldina del 1866 sul fronte di Magasa e Val Vestino, Comune e Biblioteca di Magasa, Bagnolo Mella 2006;
- (in Italian) Vito Zeni, La valle di Vestino - Appunti di storia locale, Fondazione Civiltà Bresciana 1993.
- (in Italian) Gianpaolo Zeni, Al servizio dei Lodron. La storia di sei secoli di intensi rapporti tra le comunità di Magasa e Val Vestino e la nobile famiglia dei Conti di Lodrone, Comune e Biblioteca di Magasa, Bagnolo Mella 2007.
