= Brescia and Garda Prealps =

- Prealpi Bresciane e Gardesane
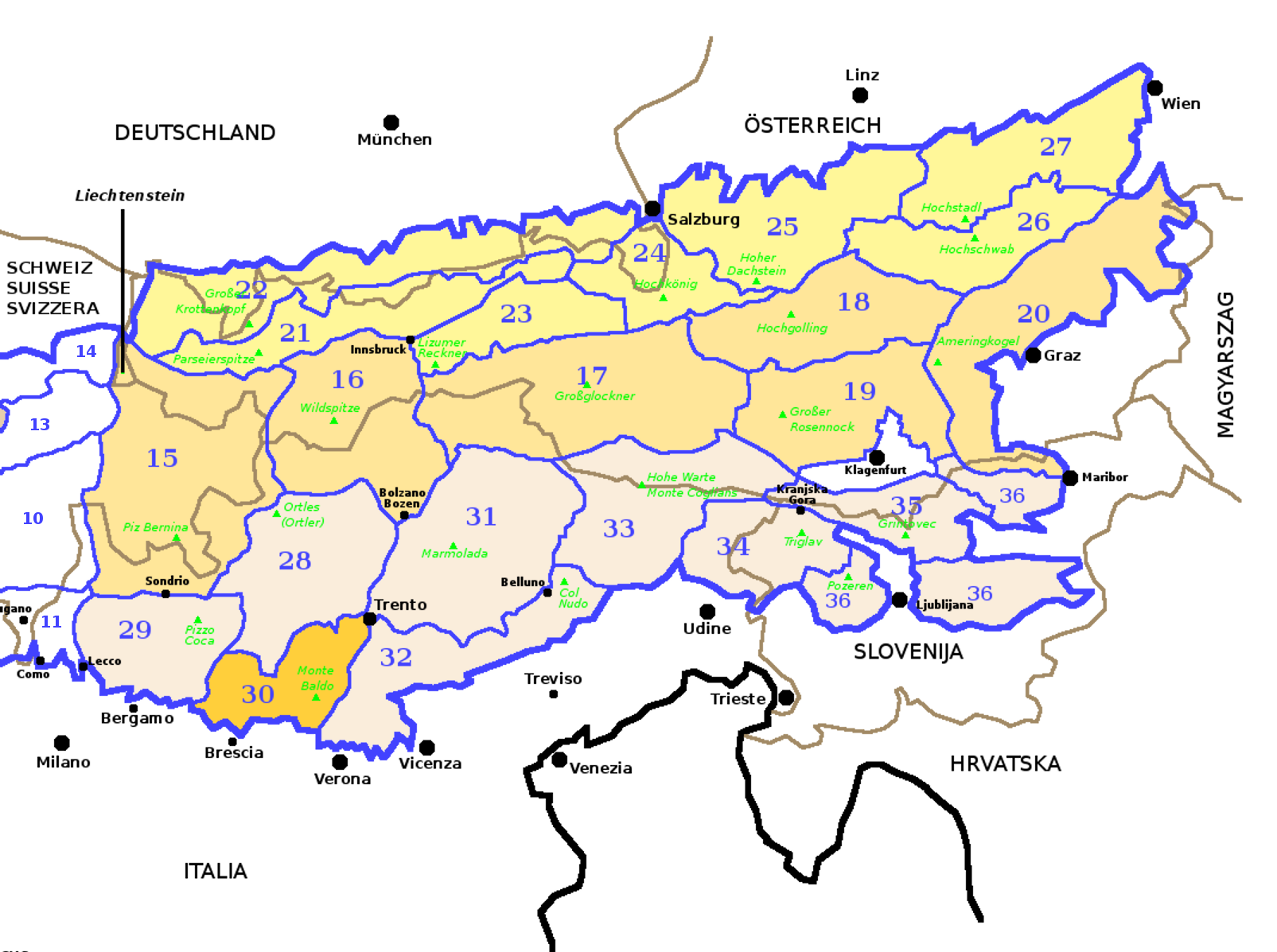
- Brescia and Garda Prealps (section nr.30) within Eastern Alps

Highest point
- Peak: Monte Cadria
- Elevation: 2,254 m (7,395 ft)
- Coordinates: 45°56′23″N 10°41′50″E

Geography
- Country: Italy
- Region: Lombardy, Veneto and Trentino-Alto Adige/Südtirol
- Province: Brescia, Verona and Trento
- Parent range: Alps
- Borders on: Bergamasque Alps and Prealps, Southern Rhaetian Alps and Venetian Prealps

Geology
- Orogeny: Alpine orogeny
- Rock type: Sedimentary rocks

The Brescia and Garda Prealps (Prealpi Bresciane e Gardesane in Italian) are a mountain range in the southern part of the Alps. They are located mainly in Lombardy but also in Trentino Alto Adige and in Veneto, in the northern part of Italy.

== Geography ==
Administratively the range is divided between the Italian provinces of Trento (in the Region of Trentino Alto Adige), Verona (in the Region of Veneto) and Brescia (in the Region of Lombardy).

The easternmost slopes of the mountains are drained by the Adige, the central and western part of the range by Chiese, Sarca, Oglio and other minor rivers and streams, all of them tributaries of the Po .

=== SOIUSA classification ===
According to SOIUSA (International Standardized Mountain Subdivision of the Alps) the mountain range is an Alpine section, classified in the following way:

- main part = Eastern Alps
- major sector = Southern Limestone Alps
- section = Brescia and Garda Prealps
- code = II/C-30

=== Borders ===
Brescia and Garda Prealps' borders are (clockwise):

- Oglio river, Iseo lake and Val Camonica (west), which divide them from the Bergamasque Alps and Prealps;
- Croce Domini Pass and Giudicarie (north), which divide them from the southern Rhaetian Alps;
- Adige river (east), which divides them from the Venetian Prealps;
- Po Plain (south).

=== Subdivision ===
The Brescia and Garda Prealps are subdivided into two subsections:

- Brescia Prealps - SOIUSA code:II/C-30.I
- Garda Prealps - SOIUSA code:II/C-30.II,

which are separated by the Valle Sabbia.

These subsections are further divided in supergroups:

- Brescia Prealps:
  - supergroup Catena Setteventi-Muffetto-Guglielmo - SOIUSA code:II/C-30.I-A,
  - supergroup Catena Dosso Alto-Monte Palo - SOIUSA code:II/C-30.I-B;
- Garda Prealps:
  - supergroup Prealpi Giudicarie - SOIUSA code:II/C-30.II-A,
  - supergroup Prealpi Gardesane Sud-occidentali - SOIUSA code:II/C-30.II-B,
  - supergroup Prealpi Gardesane Orientali - SOIUSA code:II/C-30.II-C.

== Summits ==
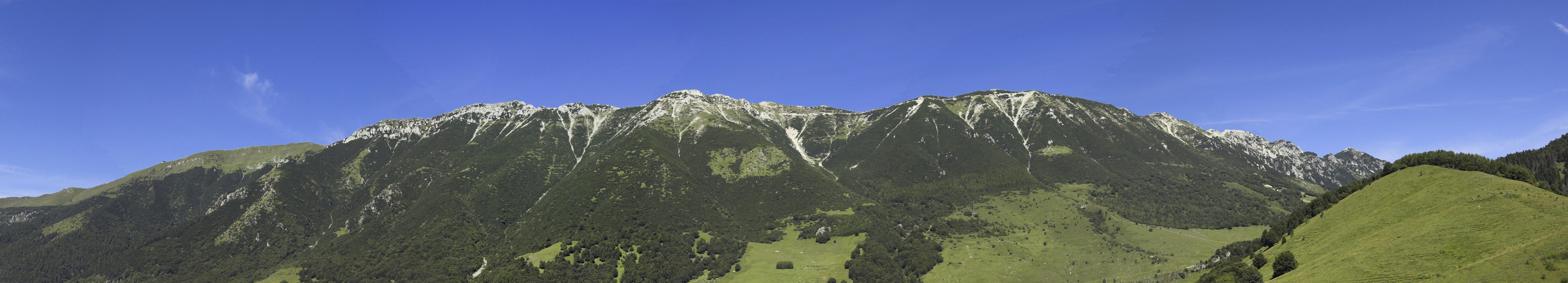
Monte Baldo

The chief summits of the range are:

Name	metres	feet
Monte Cadria	2,254	7,393
Monte Baldo	2,218	7,275
Monte Colombine	2,215	7,265
Monte Bondone	2,160	7,084
Monte Tofino	2,151	7,057
Monte Altissimo	2,127	6,976
Dosso Alto	2,065	6,773
Monte Muffetto	2,060	6,756
Monte Caplone	1,977	6,550
Monte Tombea	1,976	6,481
Monte Tremalzo	1,975	6,478
Monte Guglielmo	1,957	6,419
Monte Pizzocolo	1,582	5,189
Monte Manos	1,517	4,976
Monte Stino	1,466	4,808
Monte Vesta	1,400	4,592
Corna Trentapassi	1,248	4,094

== See also ==
- Cima Rest
- Monte Camiolo
- Monte Tavagnone
- Monte Cingolo Rosso

== Maps ==
- Italian official cartography (Istituto Geografico Militare - IGM); on-line version: www.pcn.minambiente.it
