= Monte Colombine =

Mountain in Italy

- Location within Italy

Highest point
- Elevation: 2,215 m (7,267 ft)
- Coordinates: 45°51′38″N 10°23′35″E

Geography
- Location: Lombardy, Italy
- Parent range: Brescia and Garda Prealps

Monte Colombine is a mountain of Lombardy, Italy, It has an elevation of 2,215 metres (7,267 ft).
