= Monte Guglielmo =

Mountain in Italy

Coordinates: 45°45′19″N 10°10′05″E

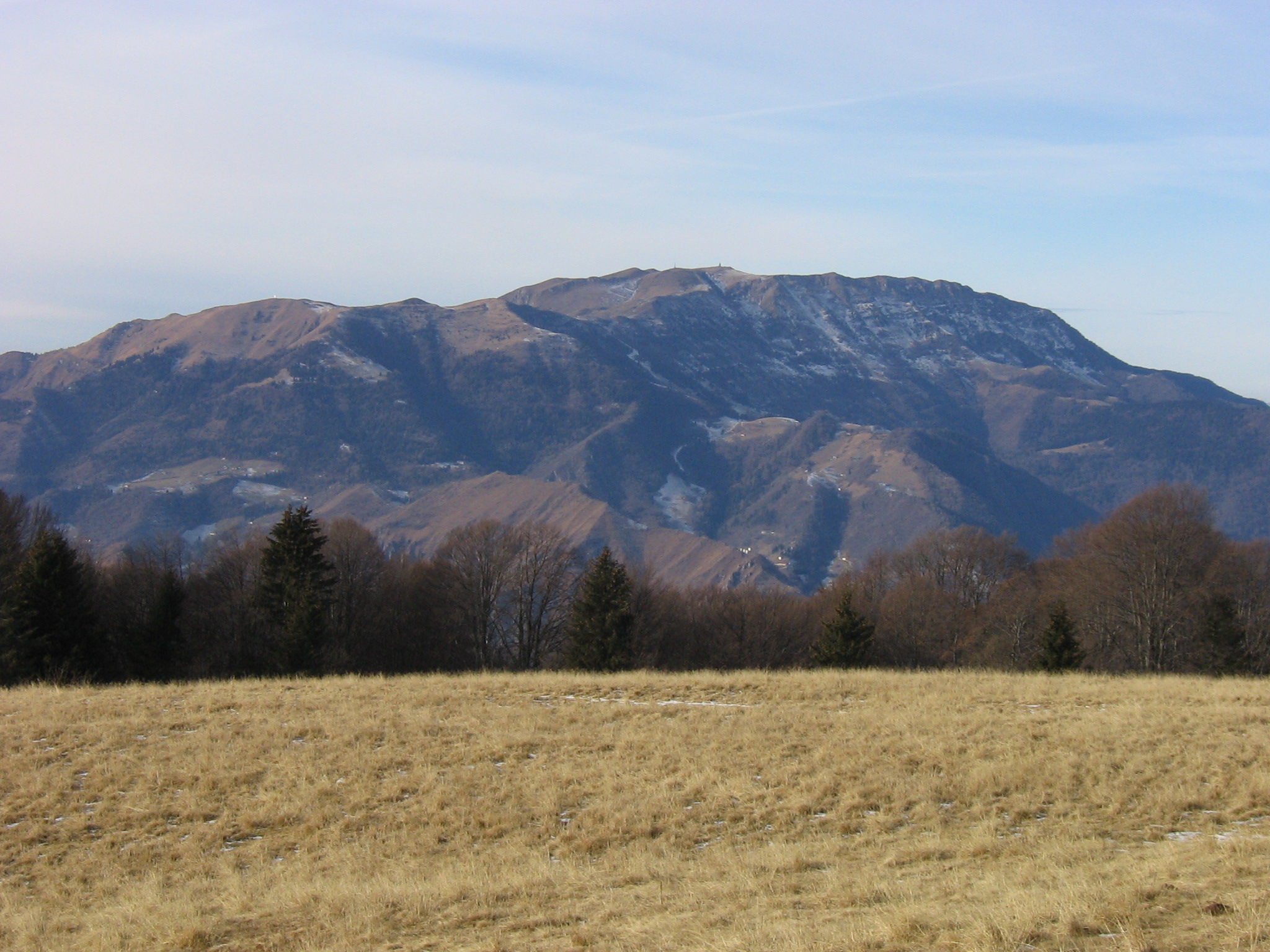

Highest point
- Elevation: 1,957 m (6,421 ft)

Geography
- Location: Lombardy, Italy
- Parent range: Brescia and Garda Prealps

Gölem, Monte Guglielmo is a mountain of Lombardy, Italy, It has an elevation of 1,957 metres (6,421 feet).

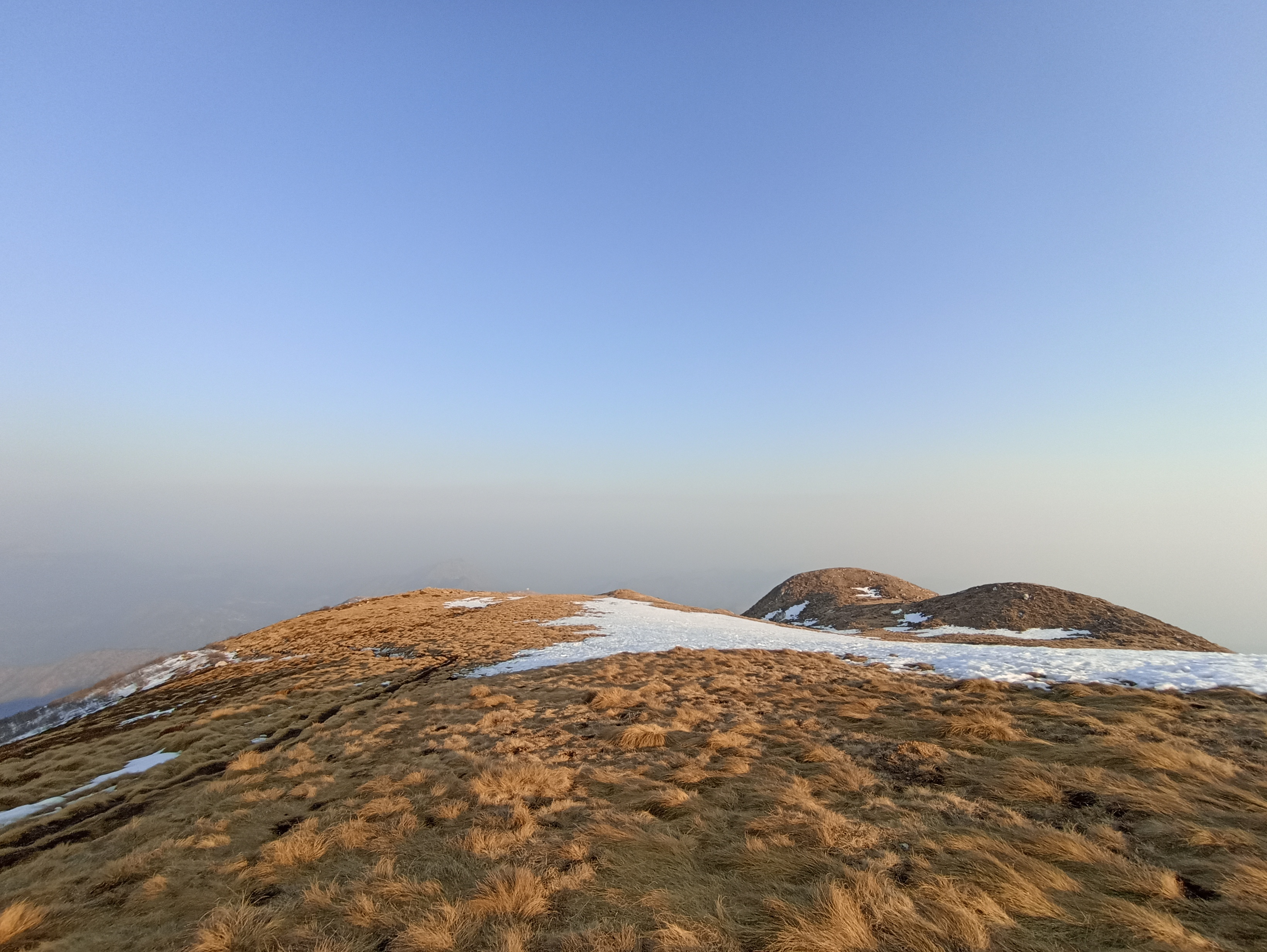
Summit (March 2022)
