= Monte Cadria =

Mountain in Italy

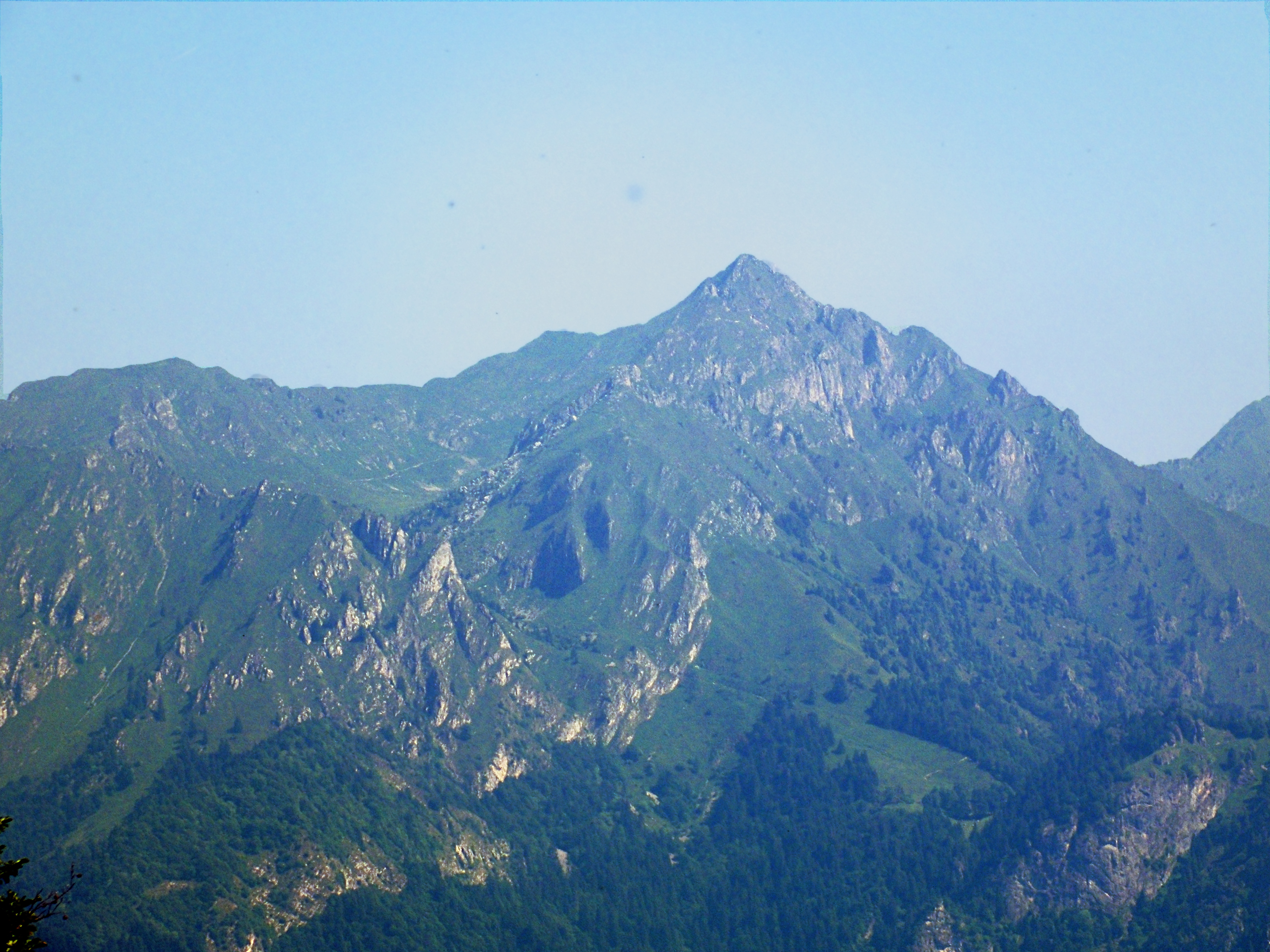

Highest point
- Elevation: 2,254 m (7,395 ft)
- Prominence: 1,434 m (4,705 ft)
- Coordinates: 45°56′23″N 10°41′50″E

Geography
- Location within Alps
- Location: Trentino-Alto Adige/Südtirol, Italy
- Parent range: Garda Mountains

Monte Cadria is a mountain in the Alps located in Italy. It is the highest peak of the Brescia and Garda Prealps.

== Geography ==
Administratively the mountain belongs to the Italian region of Trentino Alto Adige/Südtirol and to the province of Trento.

=== SOIUSA classification ===
According to SOIUSA (International Standardized Mountain Subdivision of the Alps) the mountain can be classified in the following way:

- main part = Eastern Alps
- major sector = Central Eastern Alps
- section = Brescia and Garda Prealps
- subsection = Prealpi Gardesane
- supergroup = Prealpi Giudicarie
- group = Gruppo del Cadria
- code = II/C-30.II-A.1
