= Monte Stino =

Mountain in Italy

Coordinates: 45°48′14″N 10°37′43″E

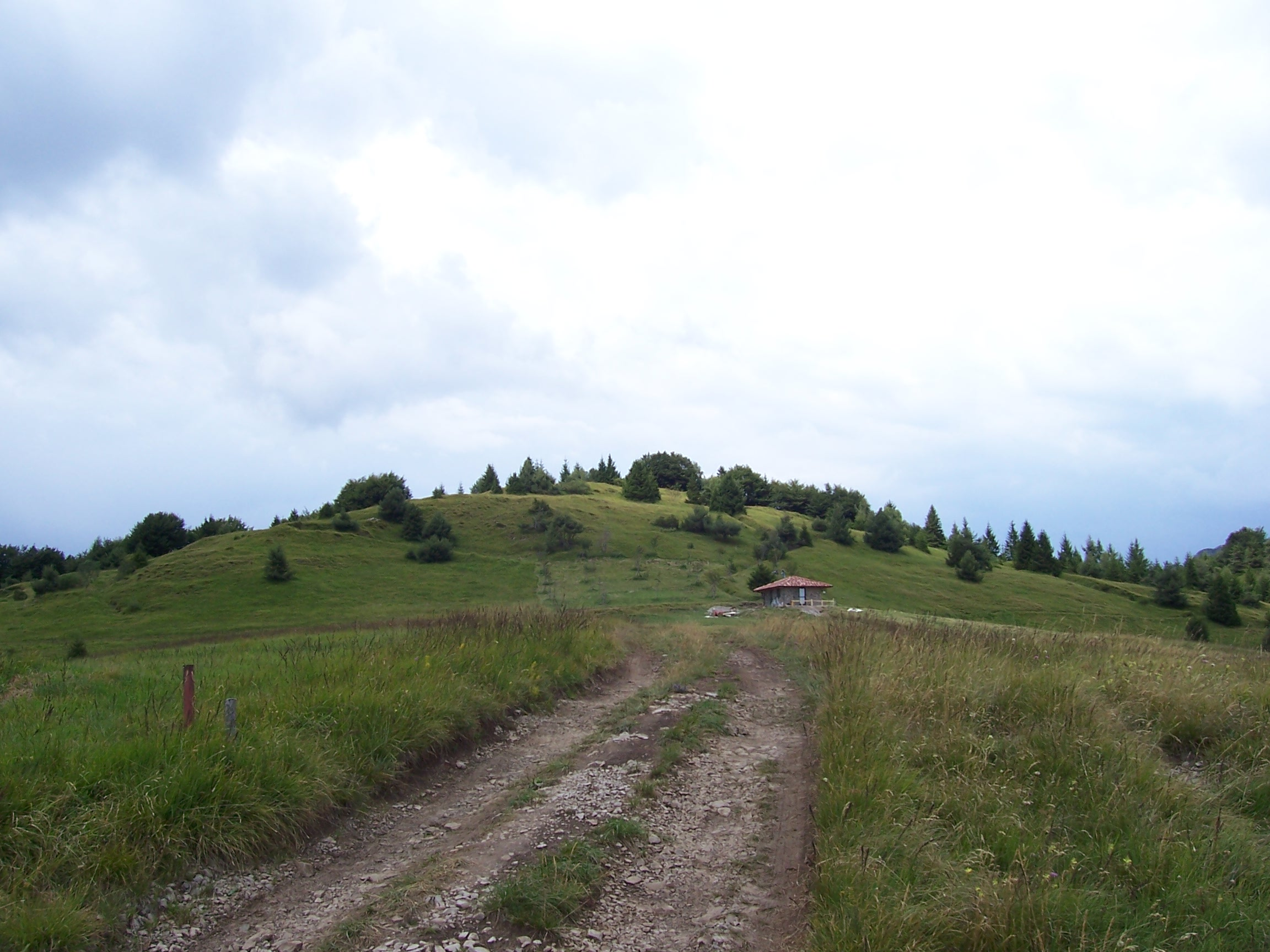
- The top of Monte Stino.

Highest point
- Elevation: 1,466 m (4,810 ft)

Geography
- Location: Lombardy, Italy
- Parent range: Brescia and Garda Prealps

Monte Stino is a mountain in Lombardy, Italy. It has an elevation of 1,466 metres above sea level.

== See also ==
- Monte Cingolo Rosso
