= Garda Mountains =

Northern Italian mountain range

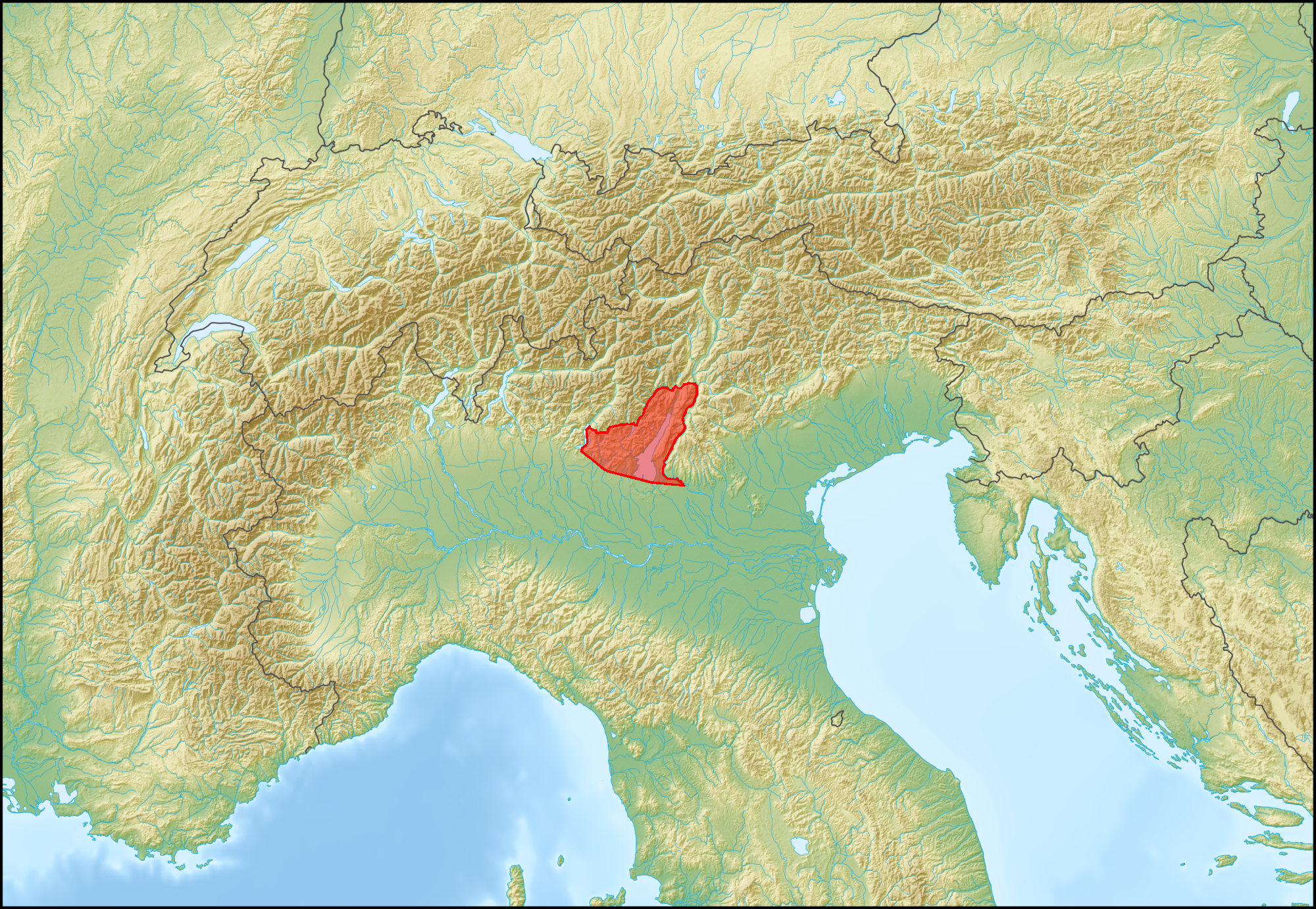
- Location of the Garda Mountains. The borders of the range according to Alpine Club classification of the Eastern Alps

Highest point
- Peak: Monte Cadria
- Elevation: 2,254 m (7,395 ft)

Geography
- State(s): Trentino-South Tyrol, Lombardy, Venetia; Italy
- Range coordinates: 45°43′25″N 10°50′31″E
- Parent range: Southern Limestone Alps

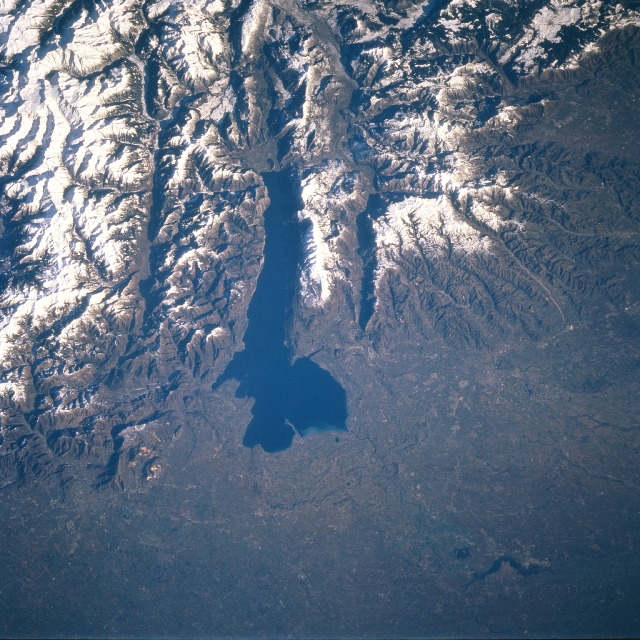
Satellite picture of Lake Garda

The Garda Mountains (Italian: Prealpi Gardesane), occasionally also the Garda Hills, are an extensive mountain range of the Southern Limestone Alps in northern Italy.

== Boundaries and countryside ==
The Garda Mountains are bounded in the south by the Po Valley and in the north by the Brenta Dolomites, in the east by the Adige Valley and in the west by the Valli Giudicarie. Their precise boundary, according to the Alpine Club classification of the Eastern Alps, is as follows: Lake Iseo – Col di San Zeno – Val Trompia – Passo di Manivia – Bagolino – Storo – Tione – Vezzano – Trento – Val d'Adige/Etschtal – Verona – Brescia – Lake Iseo.

Their highest summit is the Monte Cadria, at 2,254 m (7,395 ft).

The climate of the Garda Mountains is very mild as a result of its southerly location and the influence of the Mediterranean Sea. Snow rarely falls in the Sarca valley and on the shores of Lake Garda, and, in spring and autumn, temperatures of between 15 and 20 °C are often experienced. The Garda Mountains have very few glaciers and ski resorts. The Alpinist centre of the range is the town of Arco. In the vicinity of Arco there are countless sport climbing areas.

Lake Garda and its surrounding mountains are a popular destination for water sportsmen, mountain bikers, hikers and climbers.

On the western shore of Lake Garda is the Parco Alto Garda Bresciano nature park.

== Lakes ==
- Lake Garda (Lago di Garda)
- Lago di Ledro
- Lago di Valvestino
- Lago di Cei
- Lago di Tenno
- Lago pra de la Stua
- Lagetto d'Ampola
- Lago di Cavedine
- Lago di Toblino

== Valleys ==
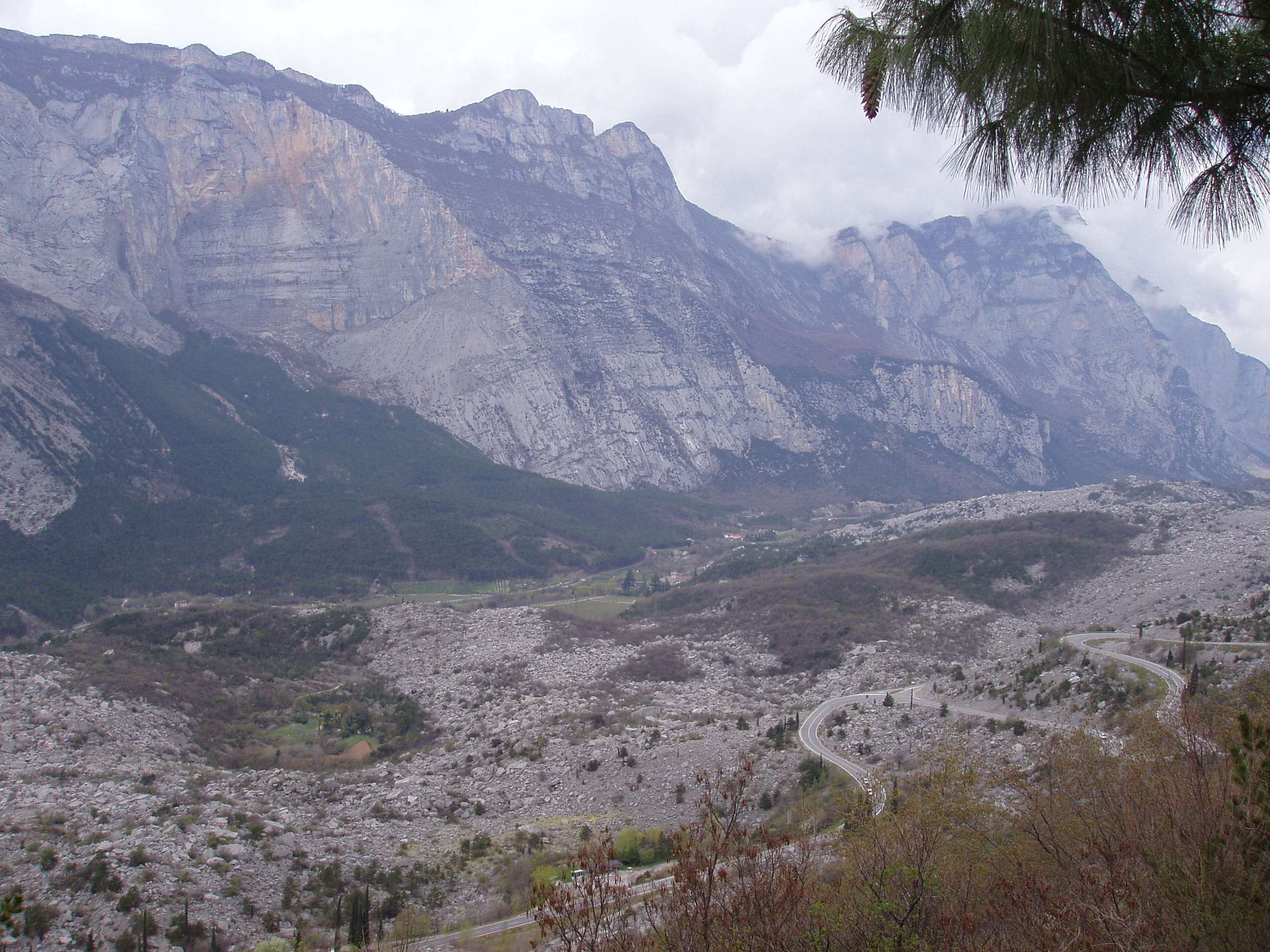
The Sarca valley and steep slopes of the Vendresi

- Valle d'Ampolla
- Val Cavedine
- Val di Cei
- Valle di Concei
- Valle dei Laghi (Sarca Valley)
- Val di Ledro
- Valle Toscolano
- Valle di Vesta

== Significant peaks ==
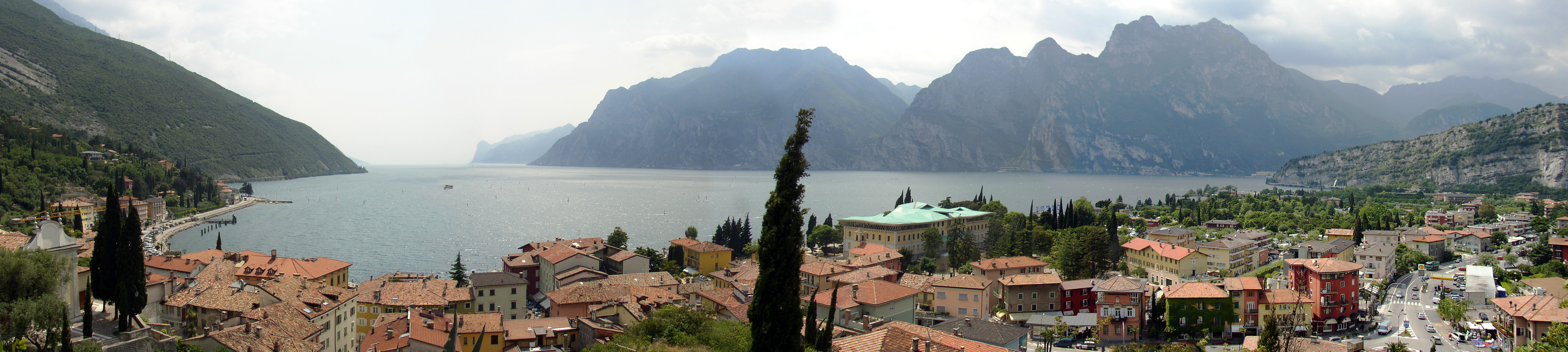
View from Nago-Torbole looking south. On the left shore are the flanks of Monte Altissimo, on the right the massif and Monte Tremalzo.

- Monte Cadria, 2,254 m
- Cima Valdritta, 2,218 m
- Punta Telegrafo, 2,200 m
- Monte Bondone, 2,180 m
- Monte Altissimo di Nago, 2,079 m
- Monte Caplone, 1,976 m
- Monte Tremalzo, 1,974 m
- Monte Casale, 1,632 m
- Monte Pizzocolo, 1,581 m

== Vie ferrate ==
Vie ferrate include:

- Sentiero attrezzato del Colodri (Cima Colodri)
- Sentiero attrezzato Fausto Susatti (Cima Capi)
- Via dell'Amicizia (Cima SAT)
- Che Guevara (Monte Casale, 1632 m)
- Via ferrata Rino Pisetta (Dain Picol, 971 m)
- Sentiero attrezzato Gerardo Sega (Malga Cola)
- Monte Albano (Mori)

== Literature ==
- Kompass Karte (1:50,000 scale), Alpi di Ledro, Valli Giudicarie, Innsbruck, 2003, ISBN 978-3-85491-560-7
- Eugen E. Hülser, Hülsers Klettersteigführer Gardasee, Bruckmann, Munich, ISBN 3-7654-3940-1
