= Monte Bondone =

Mountain in Italy

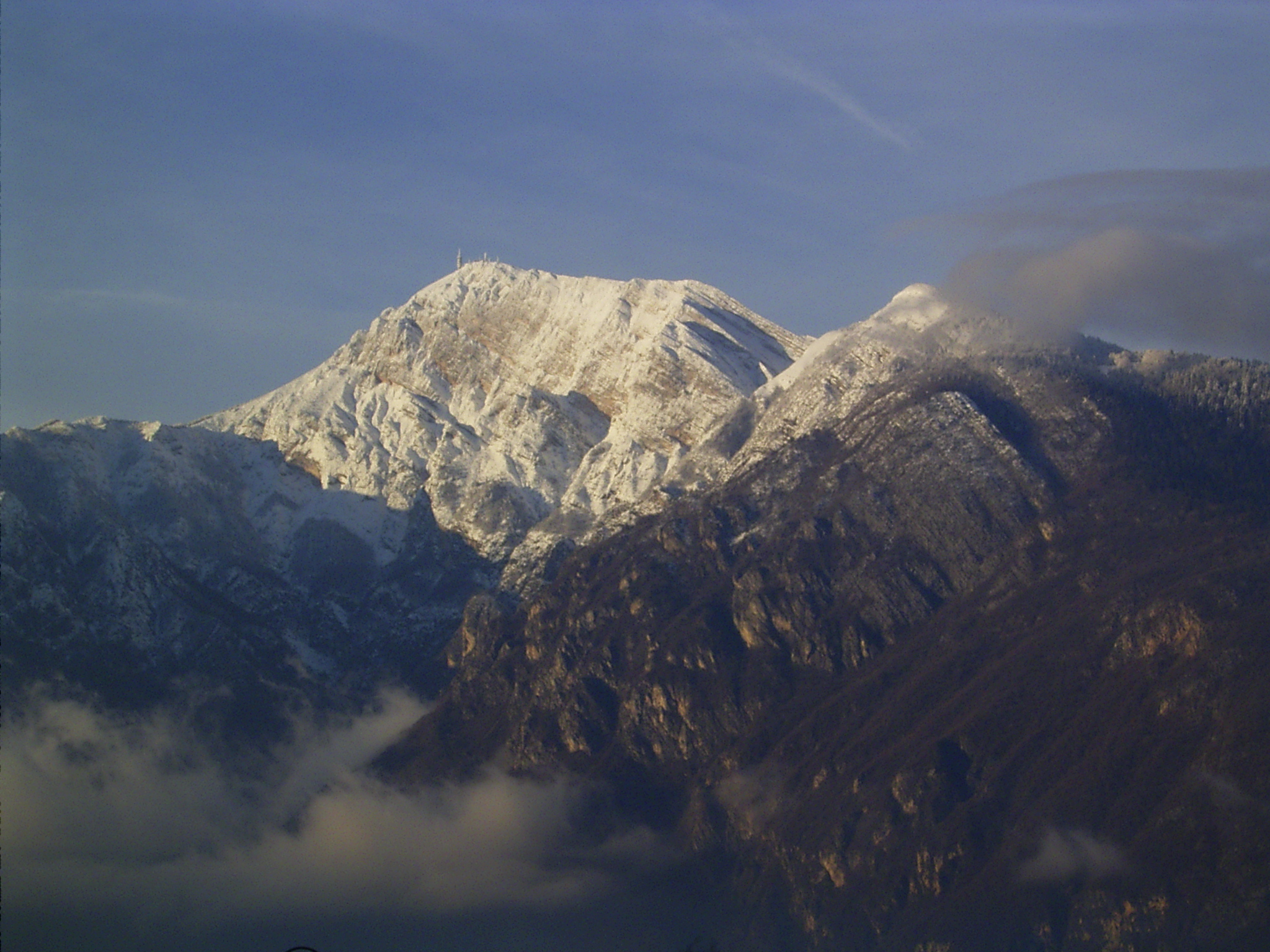
- Monte Bondone seen from Povo.

Highest point
- Elevation: 2,180 m (7,150 ft)
- Prominence: 1,685 m (5,528 ft)
- Isolation: 16.48 km (10.24 mi)
- Listing: Ultra
- Coordinates: 45°59′17″N 11°1′51″E

Geography
- Location within Alps
- Location: Trentino, Italy
- Parent range: Garda Mountains

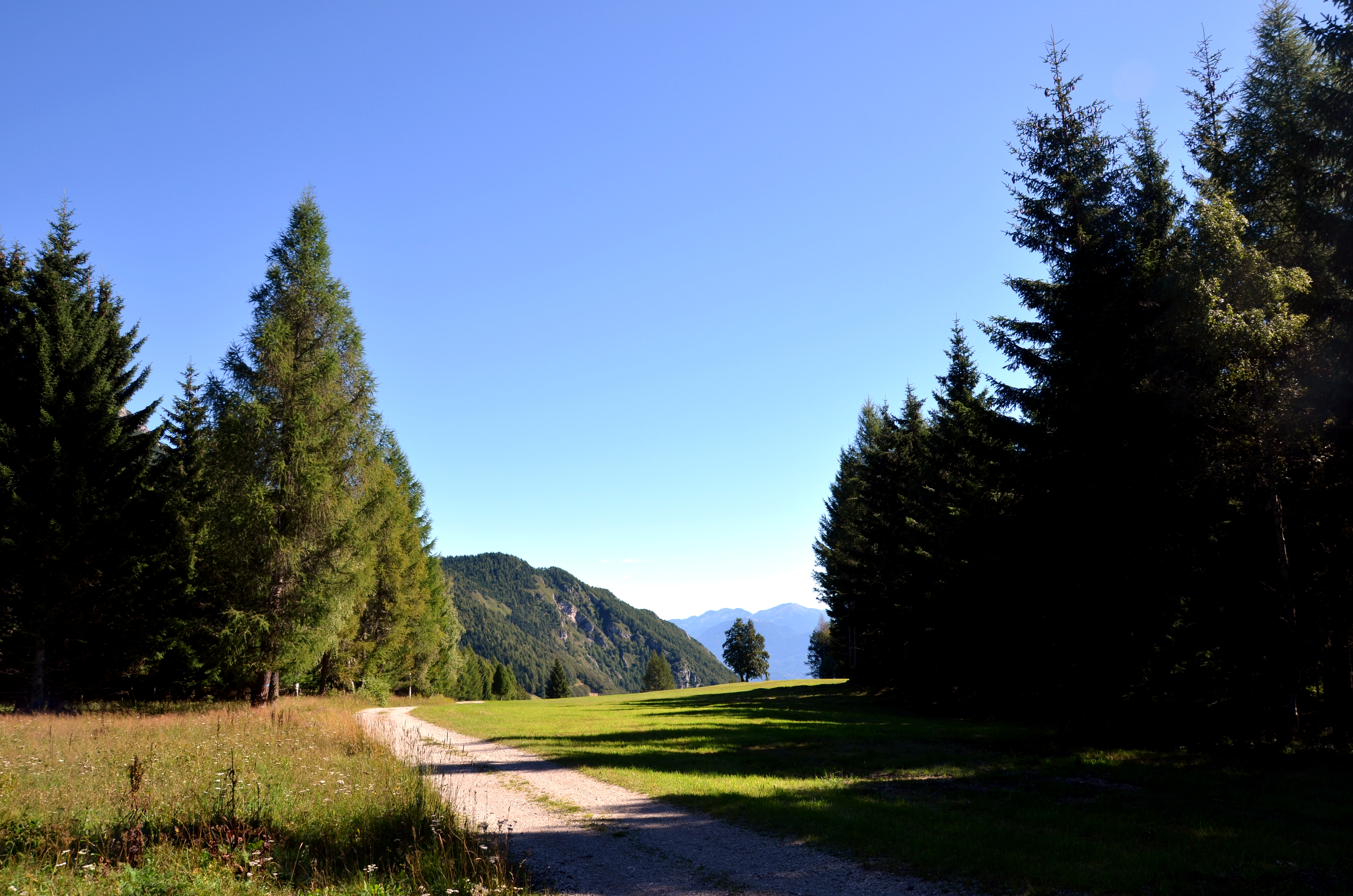
Viote Landscape

Monte Bondone is a mountain of Trentino, northern Italy, located west of the provincial capital of Trento. It has an elevation of 2,180 metres (7,152 ft) and includes a ski resort on one side. It is the highest mountain of the Garda Prealps and with a prominence of 1,685 metres (5,528 ft) qualifies as an Ultra. It lies between the Etschtal valley in the east and the Sarca valley in the west. Due to its location high above the city, it is often called the mountain of Trento.
