= Monte Tremalzo =

Mountain in Italy

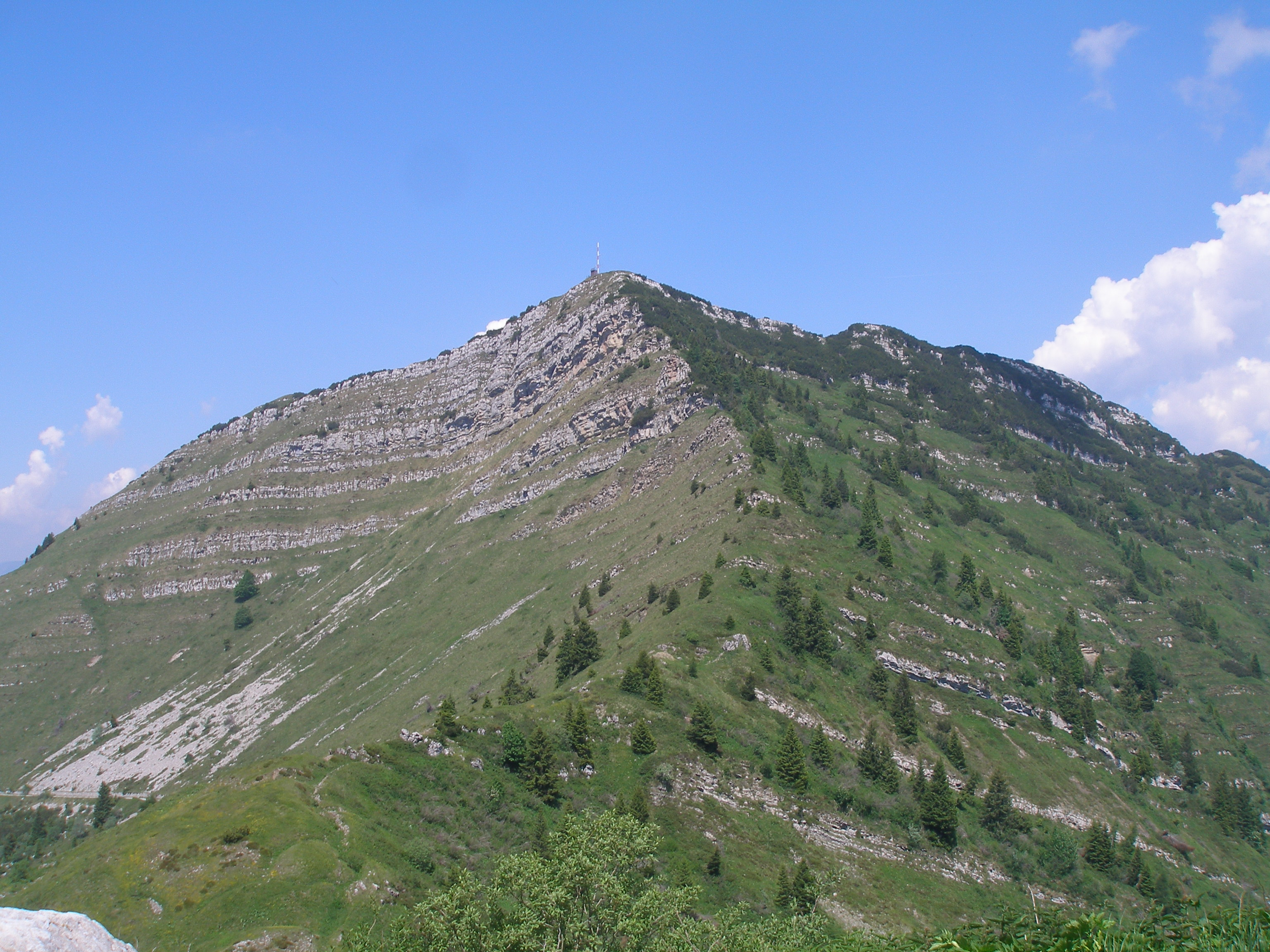
- Monte Tremalzo from the southeast.

Highest point
- Elevation: 1,975 m (6,480 ft)
- Prominence: 544 m (1,785 ft)
- Coordinates: 45°50′32″N 10°14′58″E

Geography
- Location within Alps
- Location: Lombardy / Trentino-Alto Adige/Südtirol, Italy
- Parent range: Garda Mountains

Monte Tremalzo is a mountain between Lombardy and Trentino Alto Adige, Italy.

== SOIUSA classification ==
According to the SOIUSA (International Standardized Mountain Subdivision of the Alps) the mountain can be classified in the following way:

- main part = Eastern Alps
- major sector = Southern Limestone Alps
- section = Brescia and Garda Prealps
- subsection = Prealpi Gardesane
- supergroup = Prealpi Gardesane Sud-occidentali
- group = Gruppo del Tremalzo
- code = II/C-30.II-B.3
