= Monte Tombea =

Mountain in Italy

Coordinates: 45°48′22″N 10°37′38″E

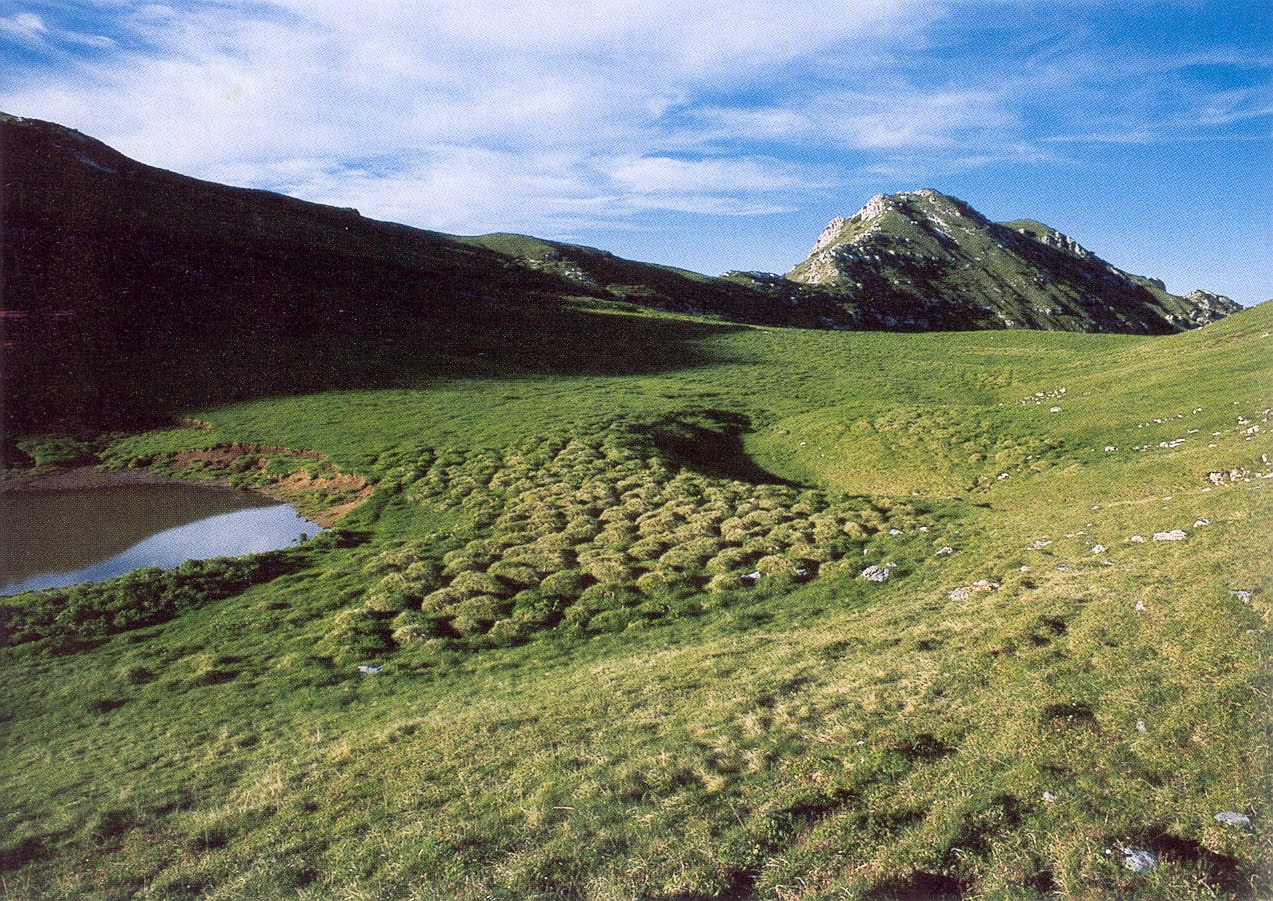

Highest point
- Elevation: 1,976 m (6,483 ft)

Geography
- Location: Lombardy, Italy
- Parent range: Brescia and Garda Prealps

Monte Tombea is a mountain of Lombardy, Italy. It has an elevation of 1,976 metres.

== SOIUSA classification ==
According to the SOIUSA (International Standardized Mountain Subdivision of the Alps) the mountain can be classified in the following way:

- main part = Eastern Alps
- major sector = Southern Limestone Alps
- section = Brescia and Garda Prealps
- subsection = Prealpi Gardesane
- supergroup = Prealpi Gardesane Sud-occidentali
- group = Gruppo Tombea-Manos
- subgroup = Gruppo della Cima Tombea
- code = II/C-30.II-B.5.a

== See also ==
- Cima Rest
- Monte Camiolo
