= Tignale =

Tignale Tignàl (Lombard)
- Comune
- Comune di Tignale
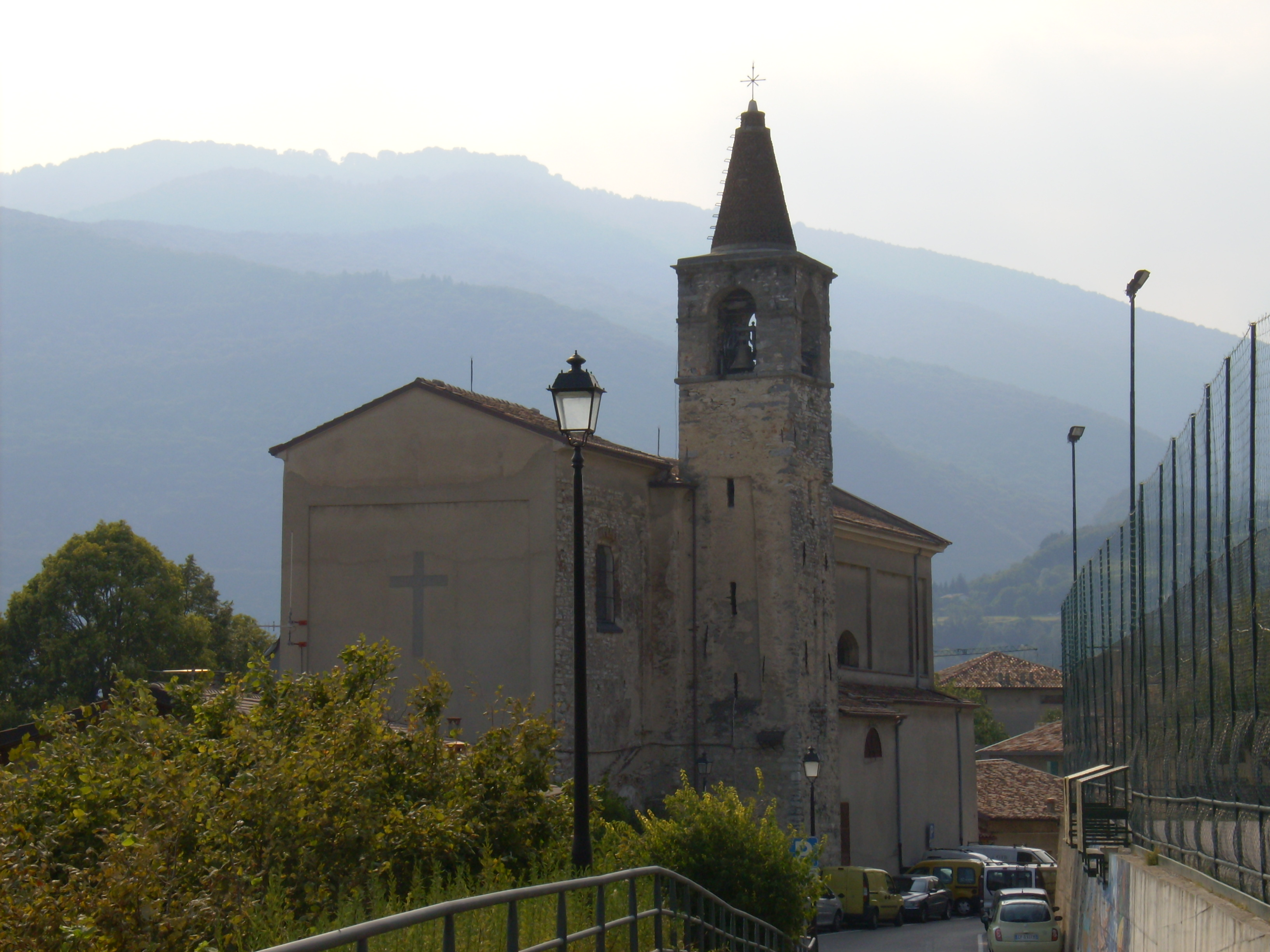

- Coat of arms

- Location within Italy Location within Lombardy
- Coordinates: 45°44′N 10°43′E
- Country: Italy
- Region: Lombardy
- Province: Brescia (BS)
- Frazioni: Aer, Gardola (communal seat), Oldesio, Olzano Piovere, Prabione

Government
  - Mayor: Franco Negri

Area
  - Total: 48 km^{2} (19 sq mi)
- Elevation: 555 m (1,821 ft)

Population (30 June 2011)
  - Total: 1,317
  - Density: 27/km^{2} (71/sq mi)
- Demonym: Tignalesi
- Time zone: UTC+1 (CET)
  - Summer (DST): UTC+2 (CEST)
- Postal code: 25080
- Dialing code: 0365
- ISTAT code: 017185
- Saint day: 8 September
- Website: Official website

Tignale (locally Tignàl) is a comune in the province of Brescia, in Lombardy, northern Italy. It is an international tourist center on the Lake Garda.

It is formed by a series of villages located from up to 1600 m of altitude to the shores of the lake (none of them is called Tignale). The communal seat is at Gardola. Sights include the sanctuary of Montecastello, on a cliff commanding the Lake Garda, and remains of World War I fortifications.
