= Monte Caplone =

Mountain in Italy

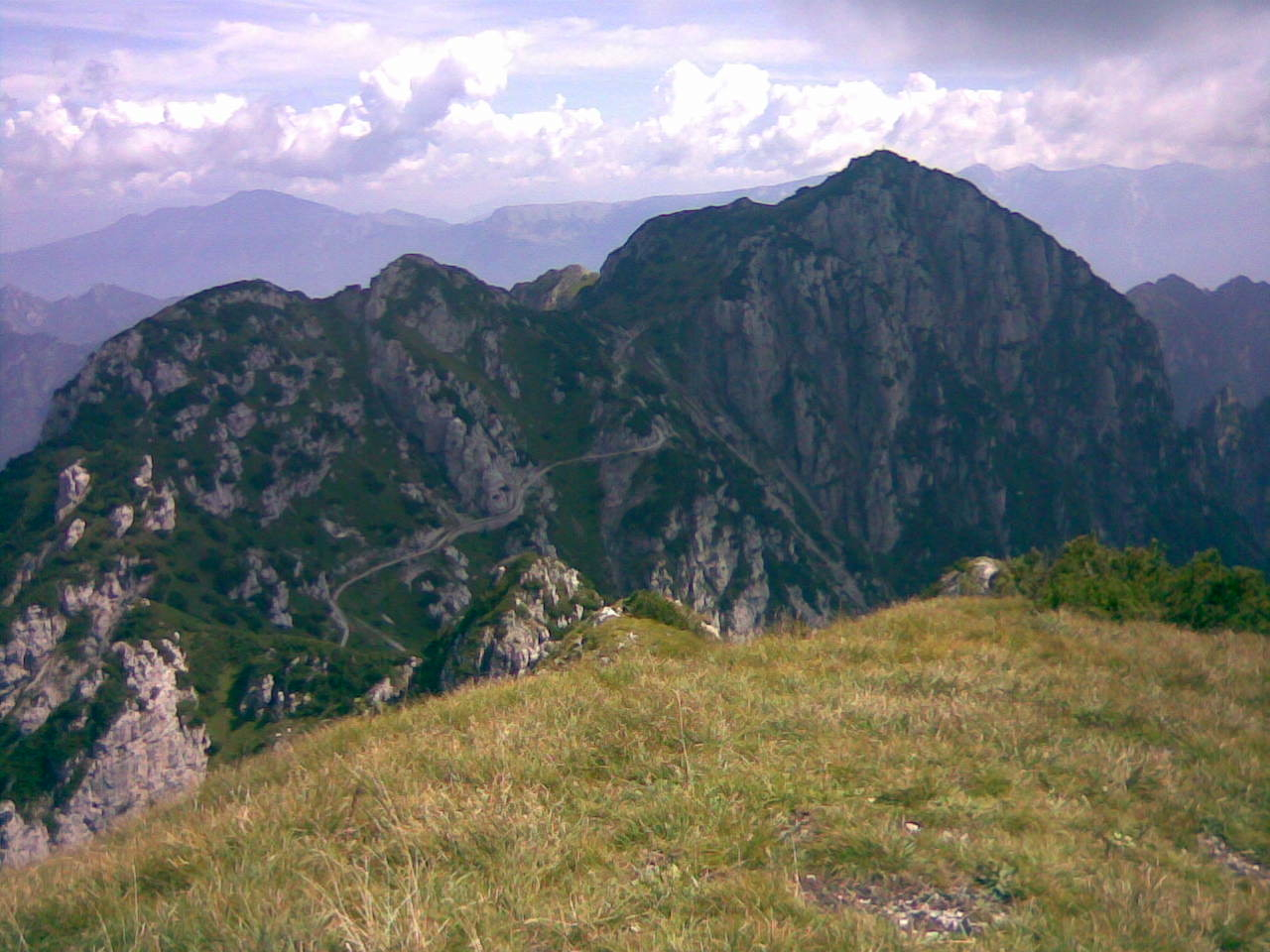
- Monte Caplone

Highest point
- Elevation: 1,976 m (6,483 ft)
- Prominence: 1,234 m (4,049 ft)
- Isolation: 13.06 km (8.12 mi)
- Coordinates: 45°48′07″N 10°38′29″E

Geography
- Location within Alps
- Location: Lombardy-Trentino-Alto Adige/Südtirol, Italy
- Parent range: Garda Mountains

Monte Caplone is a mountain between Lombardy and Trentino-Alto Adige/Südtirol, Italy. It has an elevation of 1,976 metres.

== SOIUSA classification ==
According to the SOIUSA (International Standardized Mountain Subdivision of the Alps) the mountain can be classified in the following way:

- main part = Eastern Alps
- major sector = Southern Limestone Alps
- section = Brescia and Garda Prealps
- subsection = Prealpi Gardesane
- supergroup = Prealpi Gardesane Sud-occidentali
- group = Gruppo del Caplone
- code = II/C-30.II-B.4
