= Tremosine sul Garda =

Tremosine sul Garda Tremuzen (Lombard)
- Comune
- Comune di Tremosine sul Garda
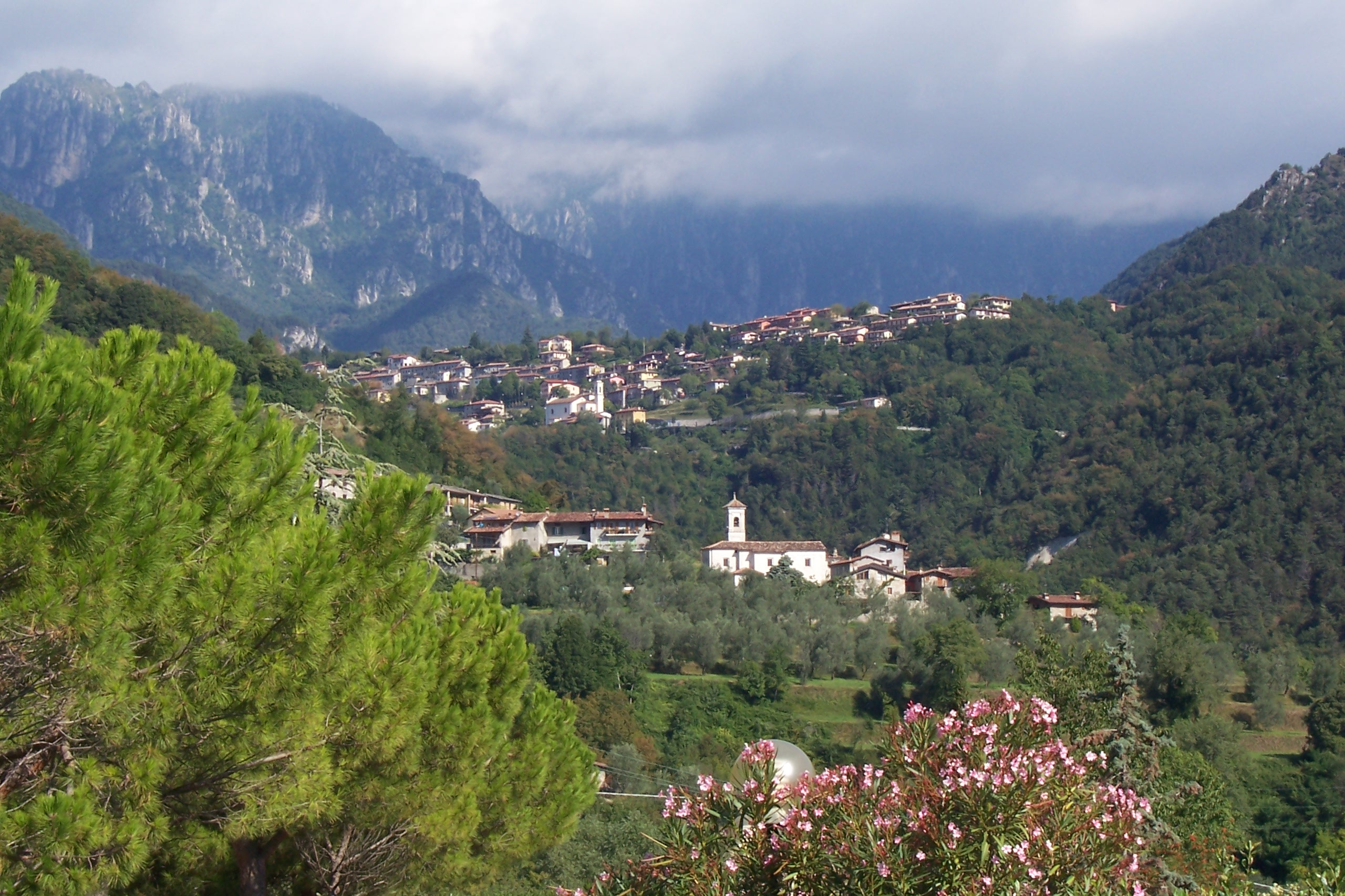
- Tremosine

- Location within Italy Location within Lombardy
- Coordinates: 45°46′20″N 10°45′30″E
- Country: Italy
- Region: Lombardy
- Province: Brescia (BS)
- Frazioni: See list

Government
  - Mayor: Diego Ardigò

Area
  - Total: 72 km^{2} (28 sq mi)
- Elevation: 414 m (1,358 ft)

Population (2011)
  - Total: 2,152
  - Density: 30/km^{2} (77/sq mi)
- Demonym: Tremosinesi
- Time zone: UTC+1 (CET)
  - Summer (DST): UTC+2 (CEST)
- Postal code: 25010
- Dialing code: 0365
- Patron saint: John the Baptist
- Saint day: 24 June
- Website: Official website

Tremosine sul Garda (Brescian: Tremuzen) is a comune in the Italian province of Brescia, in Lombardy, near Lake Garda. It is one of I Borghi più belli d'Italia ("The most beautiful villages of Italy"). It is divided into 18 frazioni; Pieve is the frazione which has the town hall. Vesio is the biggest one. Campione is a frazione famous for aquatic sport, such as kitesurfing, and it is the only one on the shore of Lake Garda.

== History ==
The first human settlement dates back to Neolithic times. Rich vegetation and abundant water encouraged migration from south of Lake Garda. There is no information about the period from 3000 BC to the Roman era. During the Ancient Roman period, rich Romans owned villas in Tremosine.

It became part of the Republic of Venice in 1426. The main activities in Tremosine were agriculture (olive trees, grapevines and fruit) and farming (goats, cows and donkeys). There were also a little iron industry and a manganese cave in Sermerio. In San Michele and Val di Brasa there were metallurgic centres where it was possible to utilize hydraulic energy.

== Frazioni ==
Arias, Bazzanega, Cadignano, Campione, Castone, Mezzema, Musio, Pieve (the main Frazione), Pregasio, Priezzo, Secastello, Sermerio, Sompriezzo, Ustecchio, Vesio, Villa, Voiandes, Voltino

== Twin City ==
- (United States) North Adams, Massachusetts, USA (since 2005)
