= Lake Garda =

Lake in Italy

- Lago di Garda (Italian); Benaco (Italian); Lach de Garda (Lombard); Ƚago de Garda (Venetian)
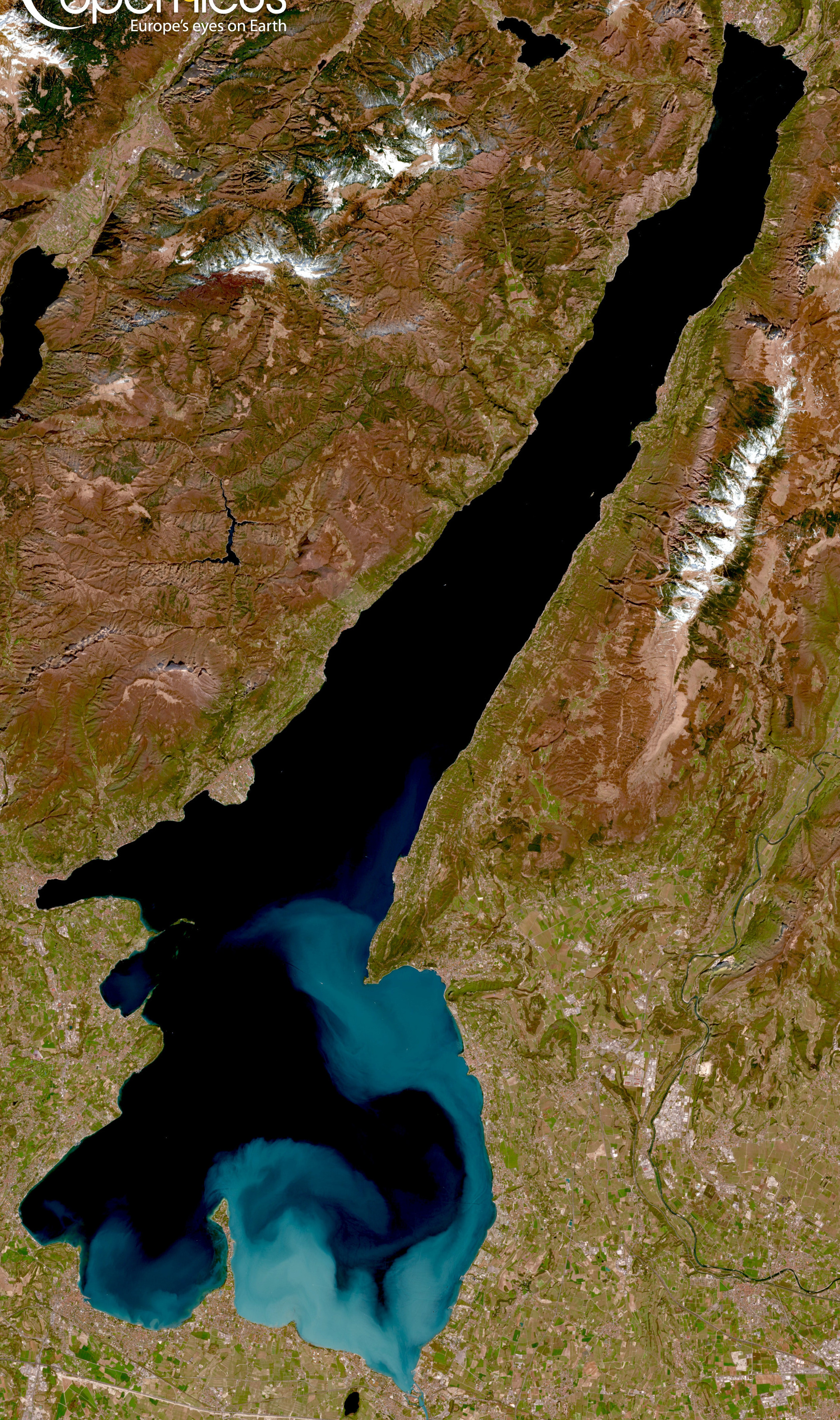
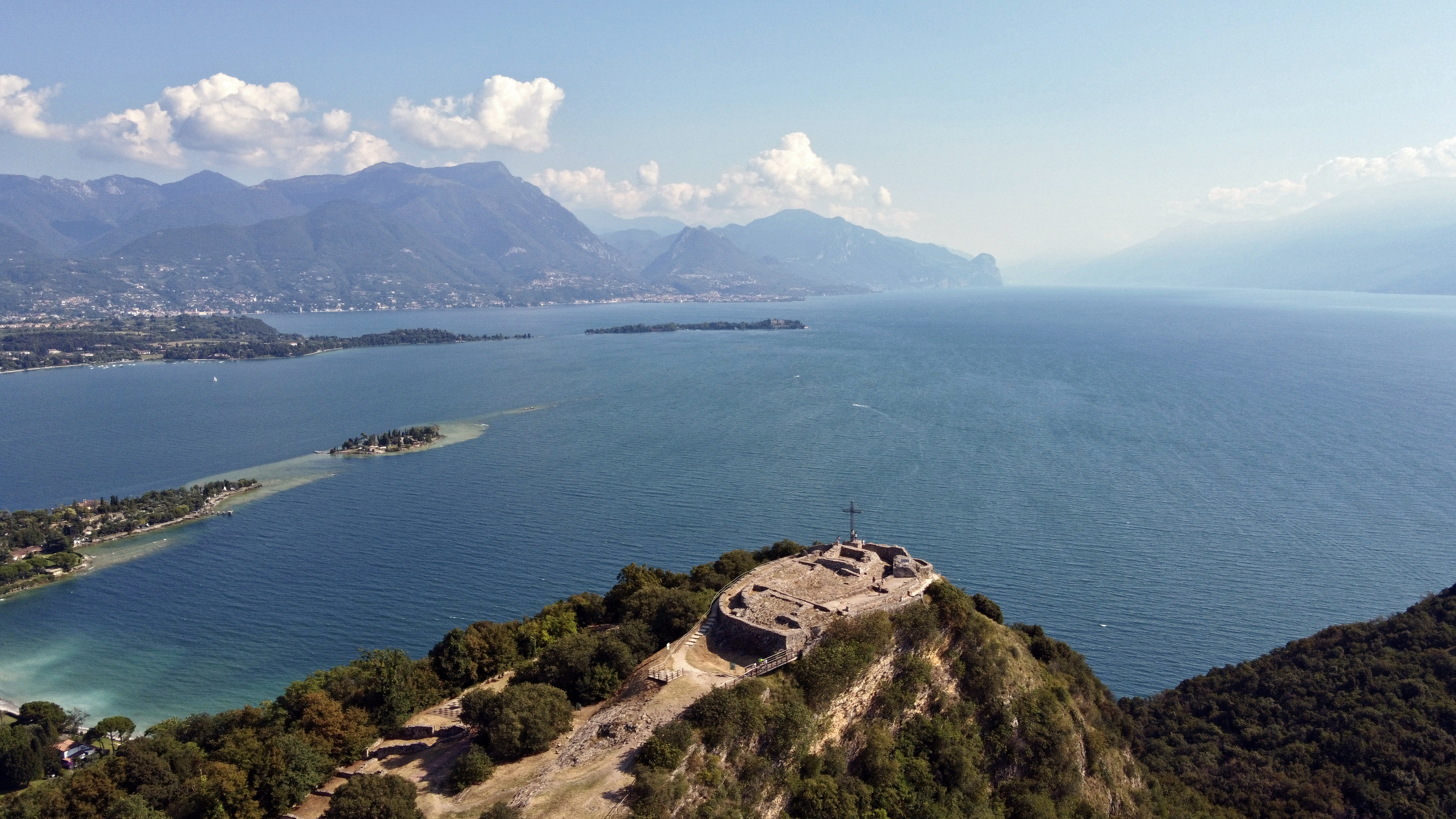
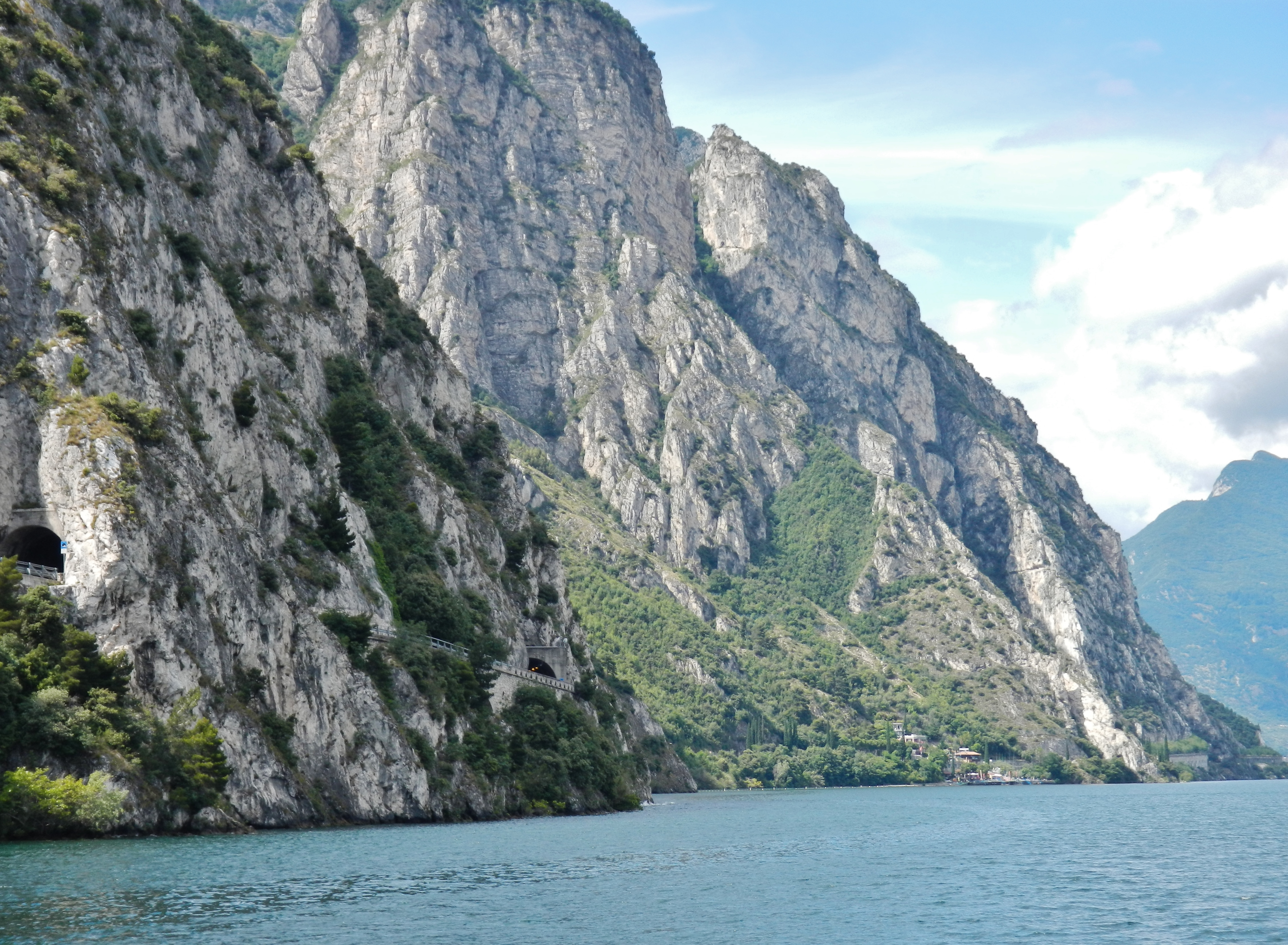
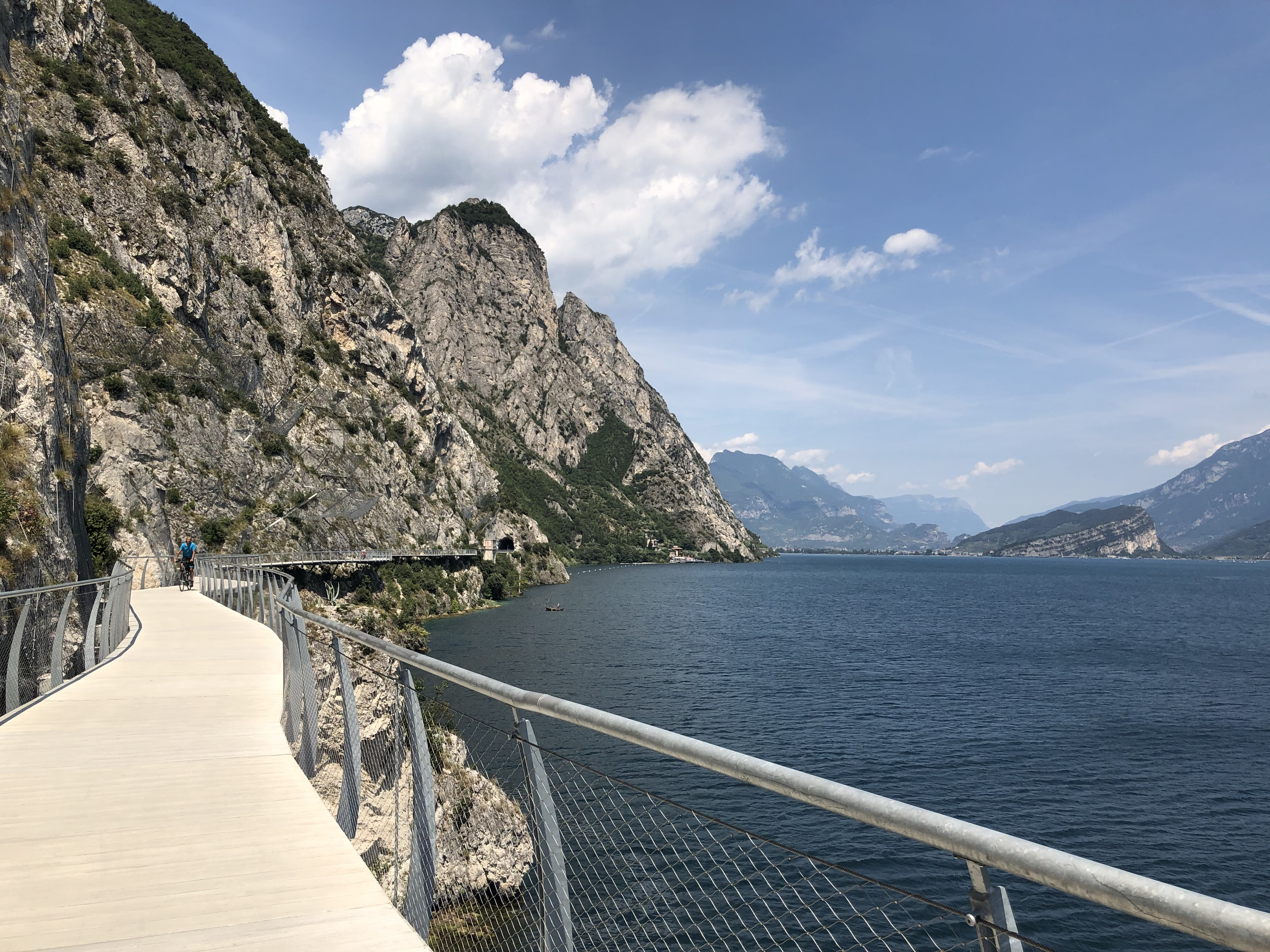
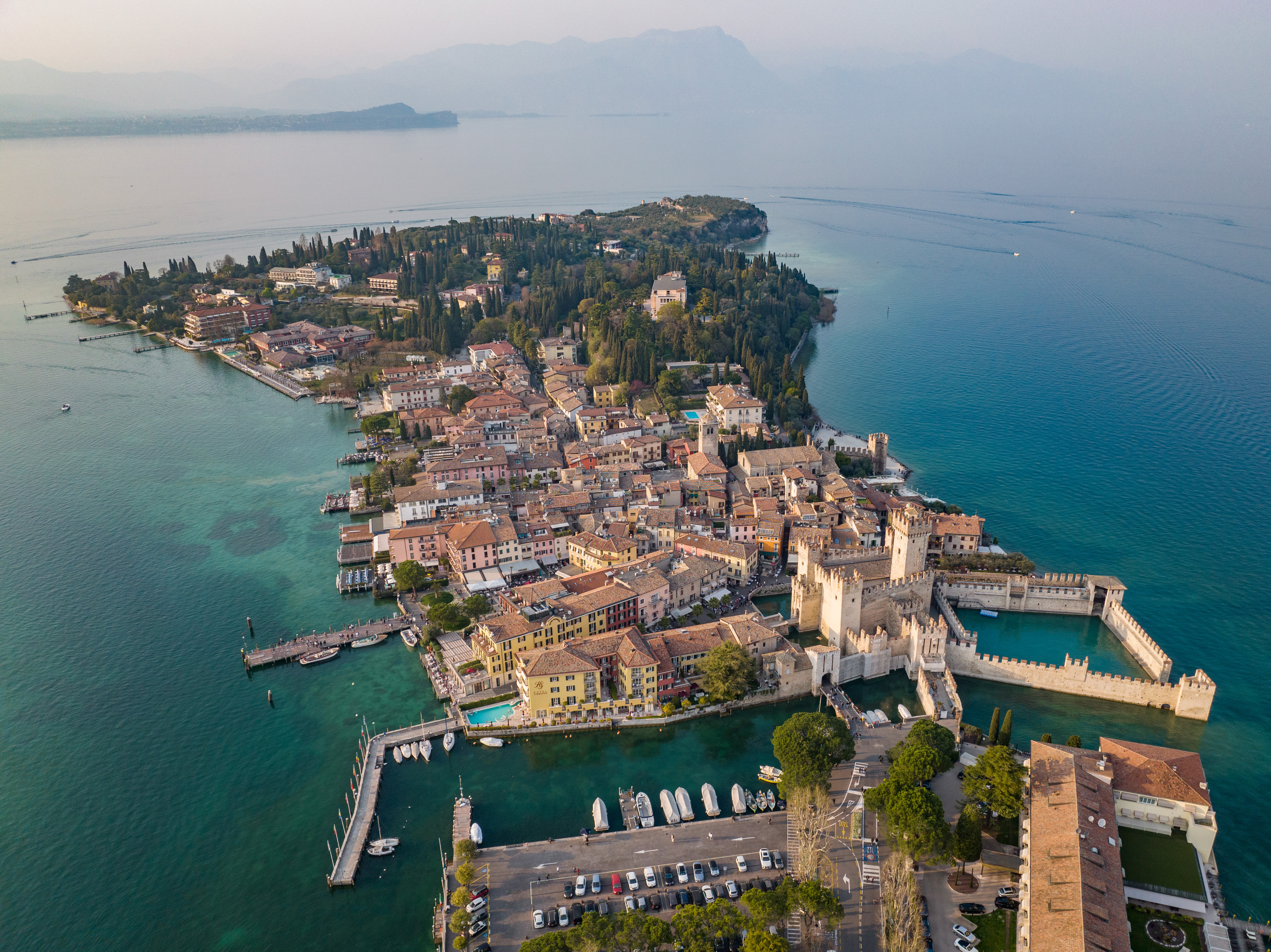
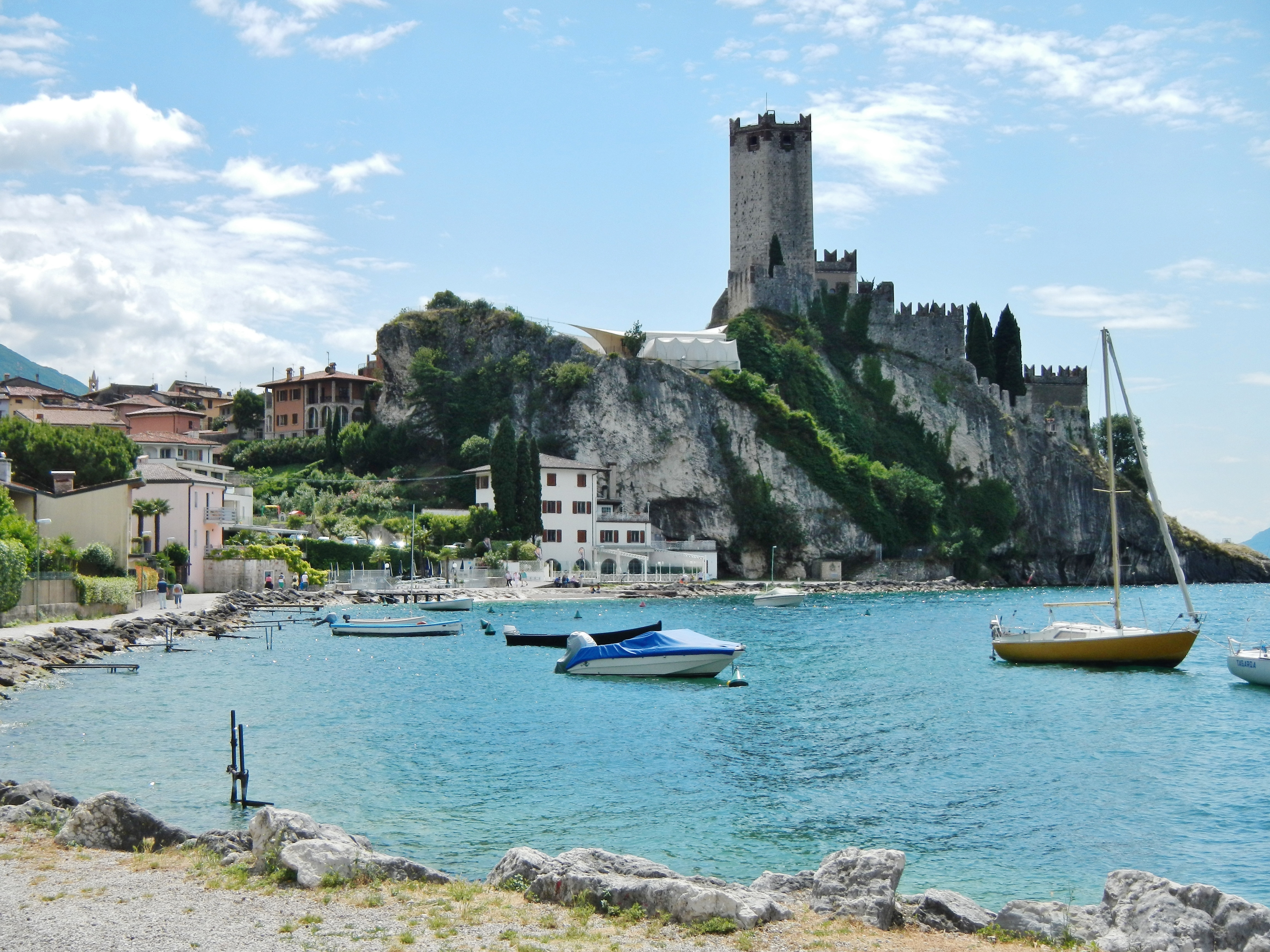
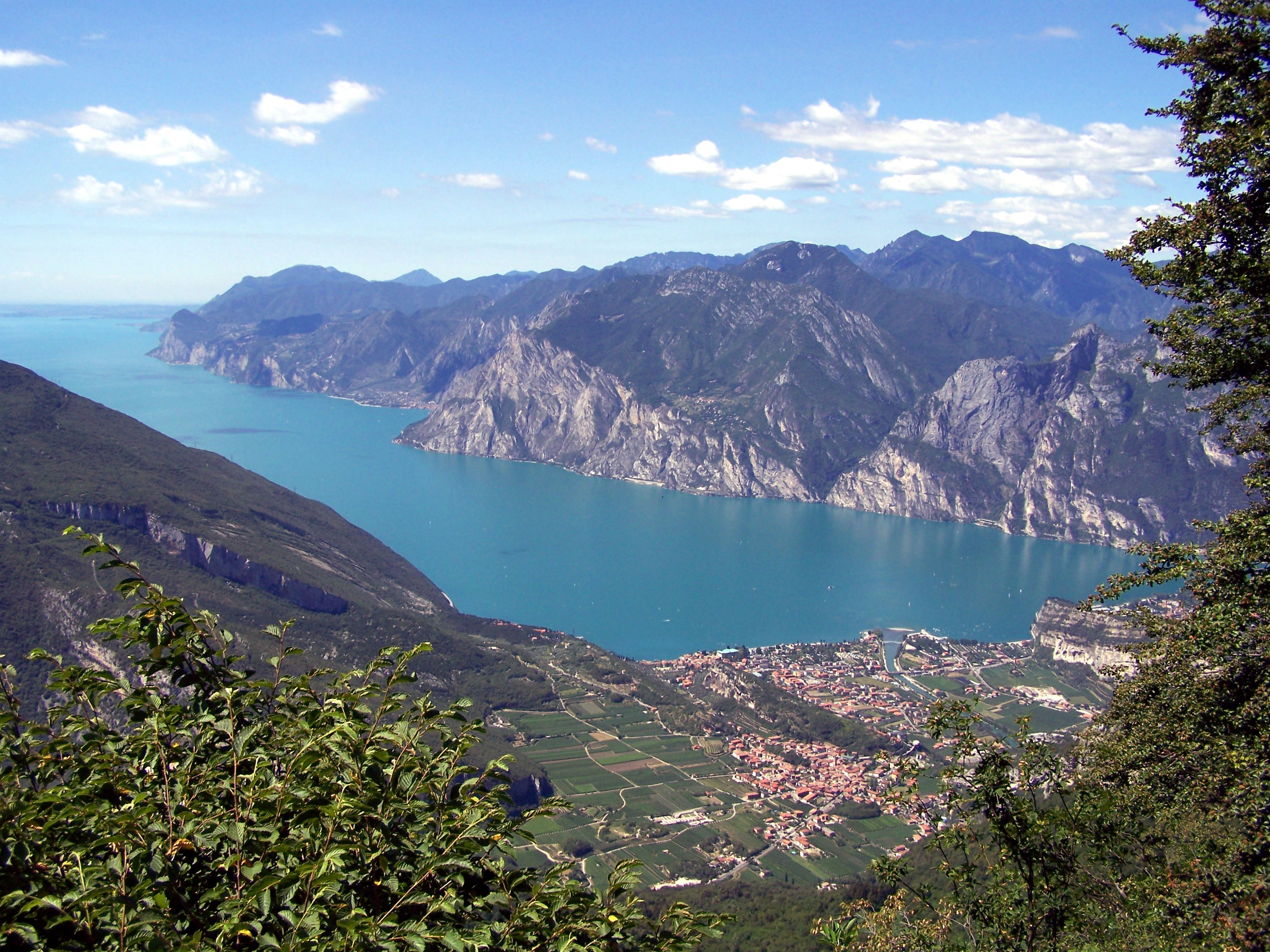
- Clockwise from top: Sentinel-2 satellite image of the lake; view of the lake from Manerba; mountains nearby Limone and shared-use path of Garda; panorama of Sirmione; Castel of Malcesine; and panorama of northern-most part of Lake Garda from Nago-Torbole

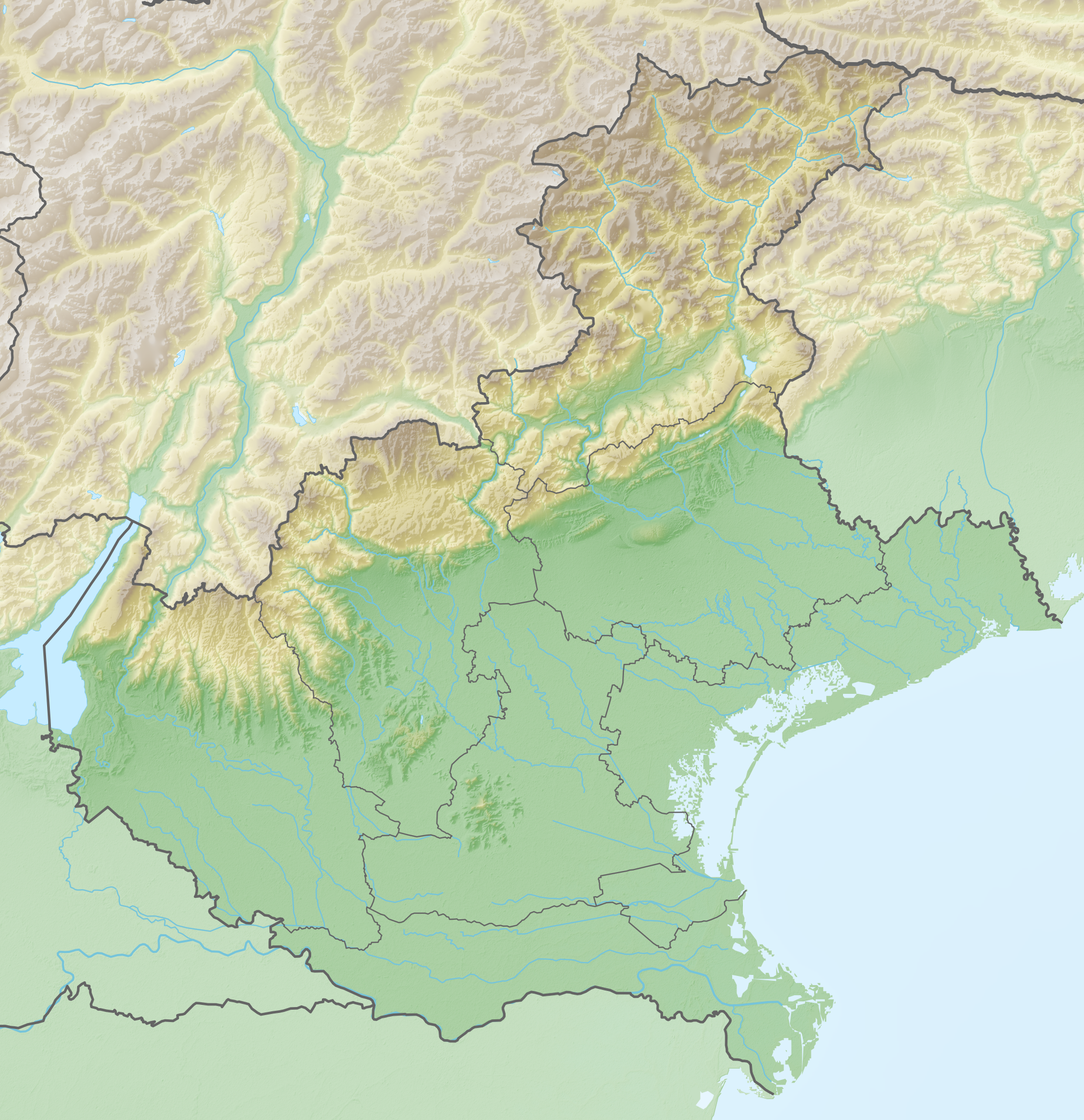
- Location within Lombardy Location within Veneto Location within Alps
- Coordinates: 45°38′N 10°40′E
- Primary inflows: Sarca
- Primary outflows: Mincio
- Catchment area: 2,350 km^{2} (910 sq mi)
- Basin countries: Italy
- Max. length: 51.6 km (32.1 mi)
- Max. width: 16.7 km (10.4 mi)
- Surface area: 369.98 km^{2} (142.85 sq mi)
- Average depth: 136 m (446 ft)
- Max. depth: 346 m (1,135 ft)
- Water volume: 50.35 km^{3} (40,820,000 acre⋅ft)
- Residence time: 26.8 years
- Shore length^{1}: 158.4 km (98.4 mi)
- Surface elevation: 65 m (213 ft)
- Islands: 5 (incl. Isola del Garda, Isola San Biagio)
- Settlements: See article
- ^{1} Shore length is not a well-defined measure.

Lake Garda (Italian: Lago di Garda, Italian: [ˈlaːɡo di ˈɡarda], or (Lago) Benaco, Italian: [beˈnaːko]; Eastern Lombard: Lach de Garda; Venetian: Ƚago de Garda) is the largest lake in Italy. It is a popular holiday location in northern Italy, between Brescia and Milan to the west, and Verona and Venice to the east. The lake cuts into the edge of the Italian Alps, particularly the Alpine sub-ranges of the Garda Mountains and the Brenta Group. Glaciers formed this alpine region at the end of the last ice age. The lake and its shoreline are divided between the provinces of Brescia (to the south-west), Verona (south-east) and Trentino (north).

== Etymology ==
In Roman times the lake was known as Benacus and by some it was revered as god Benacus, the personification of the lake, sometimes associated with the cult of Neptune. Today it is better known as Lake Garda, a toponym of Germanic origin attested since the Middle Ages and deriving from that of the homonymous town on the Veronese shore of the lake, which, together with another famous locality of the lake, Gardone Riviera, and others less known – such as Gàrdola, Gardoncino, Gardoni, Guàrdola and Le Garde – testifies to the Germanic presence in the area from the 6th to the 8th century CE, in particular the Lombard one. The name Garda derives from the Germanic word warda, meaning "place of guard", "place of observation" or "place of safety".

The classic toponym of the lake, Benācus lacus (Benaco), is almost certainly of Celtic origin, therefore prior to romanization, and probably derives from bennacus, comparable with the Irish bennach, which means "horned". The term may derive from the many promontories of the lake.

== Geography ==
=== Morphology and hydrography ===
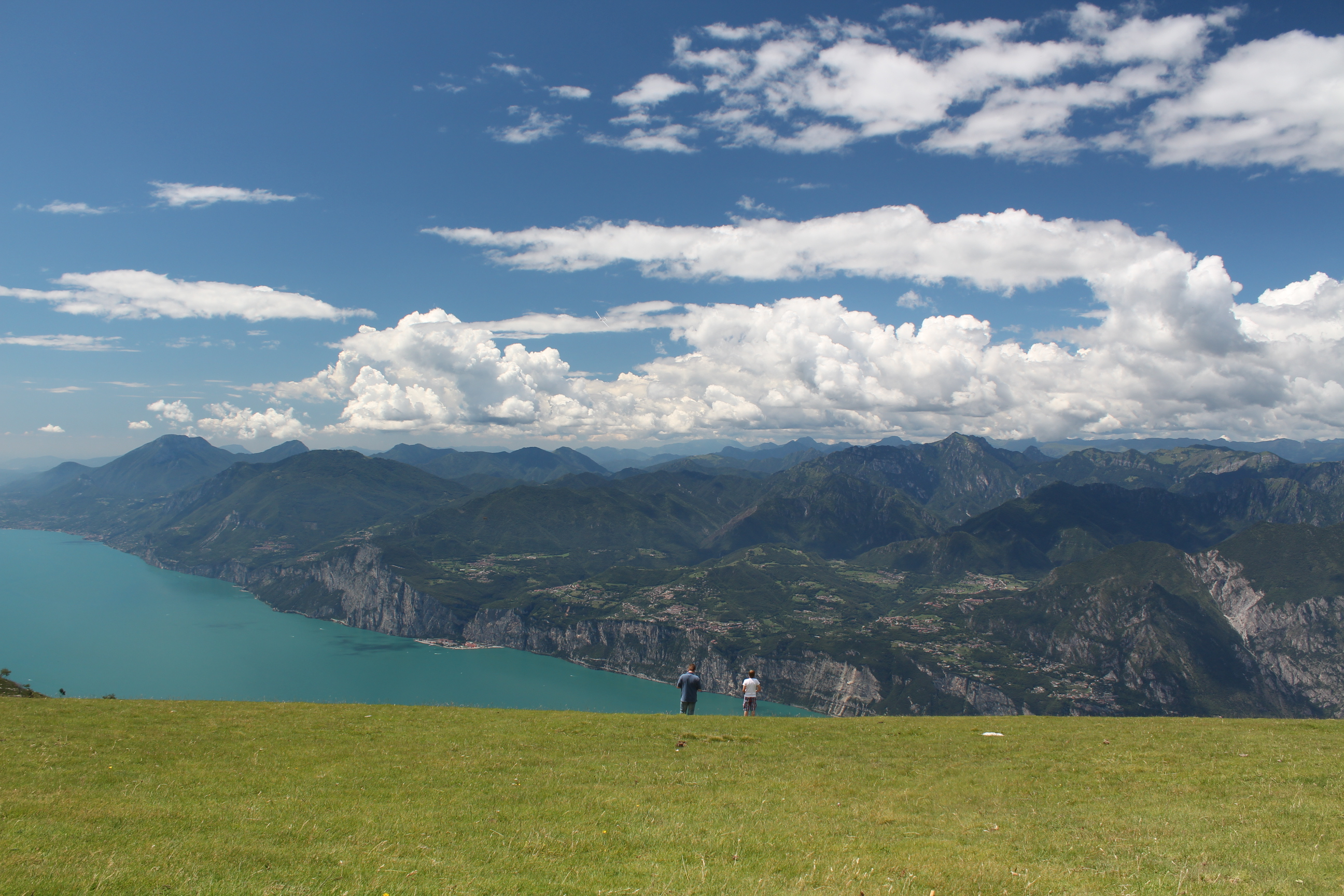
Lake Garda seen from Monte Baldo

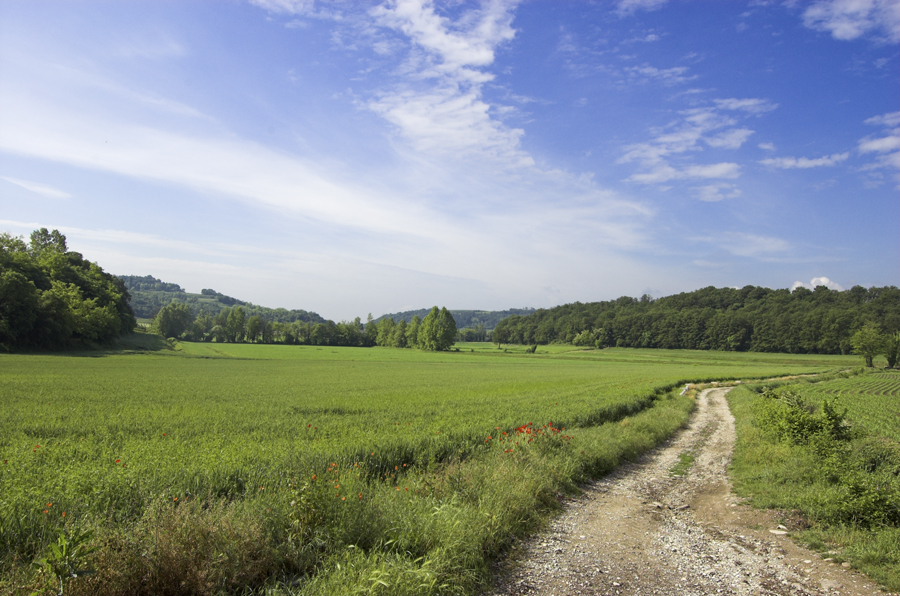
Moraine hills are typical of the southern part of Lake Garda.

The northern part of the lake is located in a depression that insinuates itself inside the Alps, while the southern part occupies an area of the upper Pianura Padana. The shape is typical of a moraine valley, probably having been formed under the action of a Paleolithic glacier. Although traces of the glacier's actions are evident today, in more recent years it has been hypothesised that the glacier occupied a previously existing depression, created by stream erosion 5 to 6 million years ago.

A characteristic of Garda is the limited size of the hydrographic basin (2,290 square kilometres or 880 square miles) compared to the lake surface: at a length of 52 kilometres (32 mi) of the lake corresponds the 95 kilometres (59 mi) of the basin, while the respective widths are 16 kilometres (9.9 mi) and 42 kilometres (26 mi). The eastern watershed of the Benacense basin has a direction parallel to the axis of the lake, while the western one has a more sinuous course. Within the basin, the major peaks are Presanella (3,556 metres or 11,667 feet) and Adamello (3,554 metres or 11,660 feet). Morphologically, the Garda hydrographic basin can be divided into four areas: the plain of about 200 square kilometres (77 sq mi), the lake surface of about 370 square kilometres (140 sq mi), the western portion of about 500 km^{2} and the eastern one of approximately 1,040 square kilometres (400 sq mi).

To the south of Lake Garda, between Brescia, Mantua and Verona, a large morainic amphitheatre develops: a succession of hilly circles with small flat areas interposed, in some cases marshy, originated thanks to the transport and storage action of the great Garda glacier. These morainic deposits were formed during the glaciations Günz, Mindel, Riss and Würm: very limited morainic deposits are attributed to the two oldest, Günz and Mindel, while the outer morainic circles are attributed to the Riss glaciation and the inner ones to the Würm glaciation. The morphology of the hills is gentle and with delicate lines; from the highest points, it is possible to perceive the relationships that link the hills to the mountains as well as the circular amphitheatre shape of the hills, which seem to embrace the southern part of the lake.

The main tributary of Lake Garda is the Sarca River, others include the Ponale River (fed by Lago di Ledro), the Varone/Magnone River (via the Cascate del Varone) and various streams from both mountainsides, while the only outlet is the Mincio River (79 metres or 259 feet, at Peschiera). The subdivision is created by the presence of a fault submerged between Sirmione and Punta San Vigilio which is almost a natural barrier that hampers the homogenization between the water of the two zones.

If the water level of the Adige River is excessive, water is diverted to the lake through the Mori-Torbole tunnel.

=== Geology ===
The Lake Garda area is considered one of the most seismic in Italy. The oldest known earthquake that struck the Garda region seems to have occurred in 243 (or perhaps 245): it was so disastrous that the city of Benaco, located where Toscolano Maderno stands today, suddenly disappeared. The disappearance of the town is probably due to the cracking and landslide of the mountain above Toscolano, which caused the flooding of a small lake enclosed by the mountains, whose waters submerged the populous town.

Other earthquakes, more or less intense, followed one another periodically: in 793, when according to the chroniclers it caused great calamities, especially in the Baldo area; in 1457, during which a mountain above Salò lowered; in 1703, when it caused the fall of numerous houses and caused many victims; in 1810, an earthquake particularly hit Malcesine where it caused a clouding of the waters and the formation of a crack 200 metres (660 feet) long and 18 centimetres (7.1 inches) wide in the town square; in 1836, when the tremors caused some landslides in Mount Tomè, in the northernmost part of Monte Baldo, which in turn caused a strong eruption of water.

In 1866 a rather long period of seismic agitation began in the Baldo area, with earthquakes of varying intensity, tremors, shaking and other phenomena of lesser importance, which saw as the most important event the earthquake of 5 January 1892, which shook the entire Garda region with extraordinary violence, causing the fall of chimneys and walls.

Other earthquakes more recently hit Salò and its surroundings, in particular, the earthquake of 31 October 1901 caused widespread damage to buildings, some collapses and cracks in the ground, while another earthquake in 2004 caused damage to some buildings.

=== Islands ===
The lake has also numerous small islands and five main ones, the largest being Isola del Garda. Nearby to the south is San Biagio island, also known as the Isola dei Conigli ("island of the rabbits"). Both are offshore of San Felice del Benaco, on the lake's western side. The three other main islands are Isola dell'Olivo, Isola di Sogno, and Isola di Trimelone, all farther north near the eastern side.

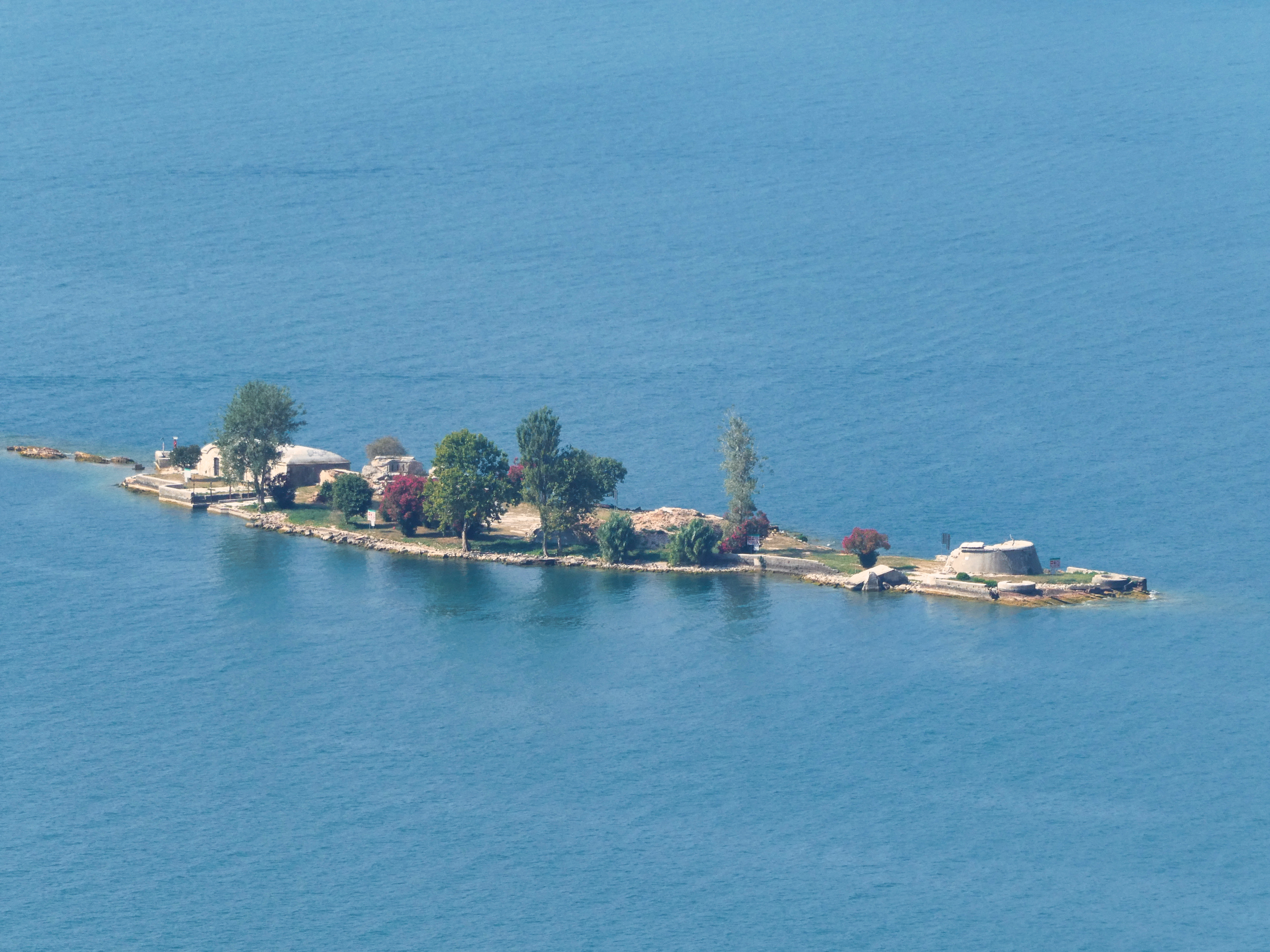
Isola di Trimelone

Isola di San Biagio and Isola del Garda

=== Climate ===
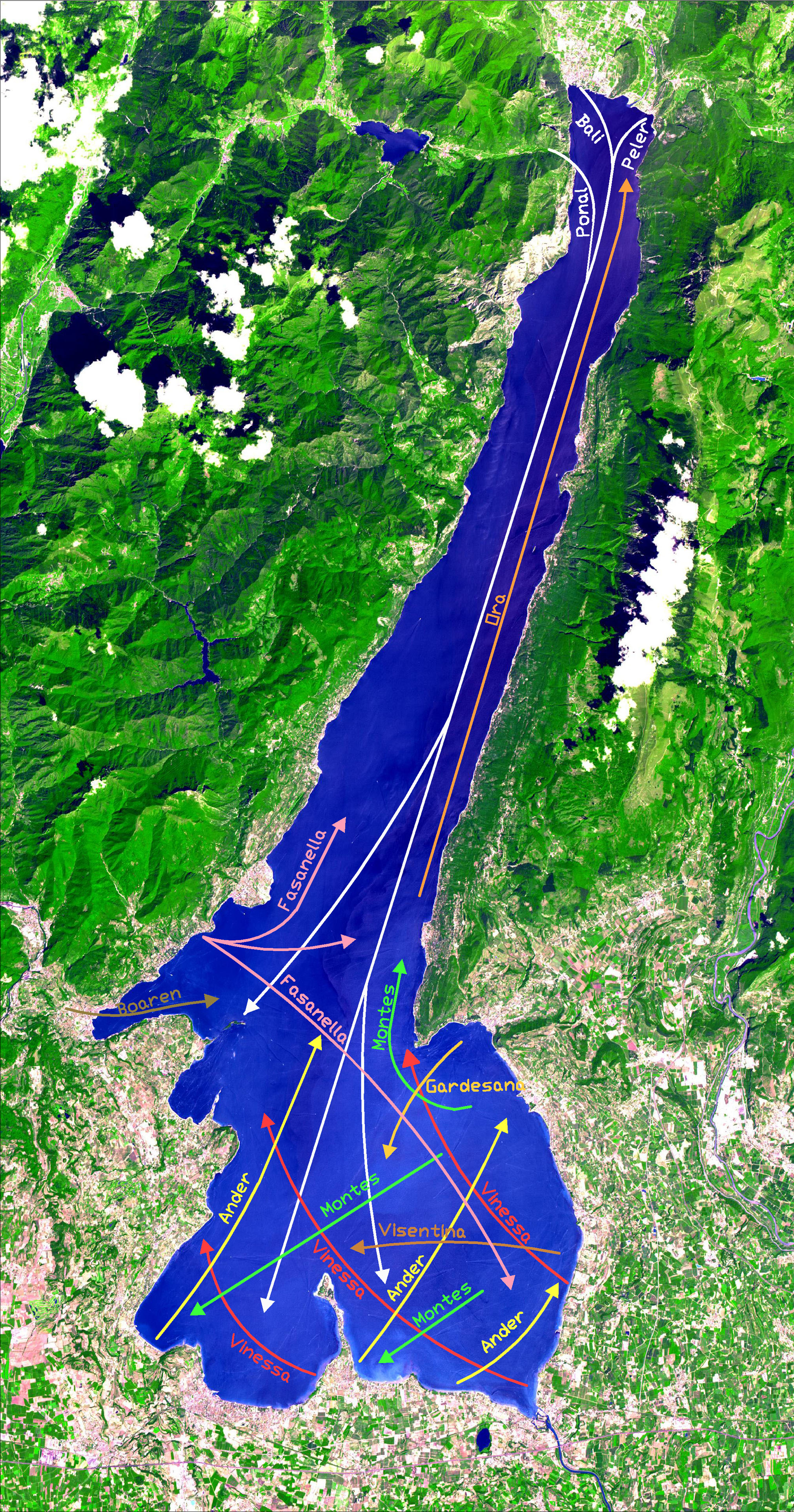
Lake Garda with its wind pattern

The particularly mild climate favours the growth of some hardy Mediterranean plants, including the olive tree, parasol pine, Mediterranean cypress, Chinese windmill palm and Canary Island date palm. Some hardy citrus trees, such as hardy lemons and satsuma can also be found, which are extremely rare at this latitude (46° North). In ancient times, poets like Catullus wrote about "Lacus Benacus" with its mild climate vivified by the winds. The lake is oriented from north to south towards the Po Valley, so many winds typical of the lake are the result of a difference between lower and higher altitude temperatures. Due to this, winds are generated that descend from the mountains to the plains in the morning and go back to the mountains in the afternoon. The bottleneck formed by the lake basin affects the timing of the winds, many of which happen on a regular daily basis. The winds are all named, most in regional Italian dialect so a single wind may have different names.

Climate data for Lake Garda (Salò) (1981–2010)
| Month | Jan | Feb | Mar | Apr | May | Jun | Jul | Aug | Sep | Oct | Nov | Dec | Year |
|---|---|---|---|---|---|---|---|---|---|---|---|---|---|
| Mean daily maximum °C (°F) | 7.3 (45.1) | 8.8 (47.8) | 13.4 (56.1) | 17.4 (63.3) | 22.8 (73.0) | 26.7 (80.1) | 29.4 (84.9) | 28.7 (83.7) | 23.8 (74.8) | 17.8 (64.0) | 11.9 (53.4) | 8.1 (46.6) | 18.0 (64.4) |
| Daily mean °C (°F) | 4.5 (40.1) | 5.5 (41.9) | 9.5 (49.1) | 13.2 (55.8) | 18.2 (64.8) | 21.9 (71.4) | 24.5 (76.1) | 24.0 (75.2) | 19.7 (67.5) | 14.7 (58.5) | 9.0 (48.2) | 5.4 (41.7) | 14.2 (57.5) |
| Mean daily minimum °C (°F) | 1.6 (34.9) | 2.2 (36.0) | 5.6 (42.1) | 9.0 (48.2) | 13.5 (56.3) | 17.1 (62.8) | 19.5 (67.1) | 19.2 (66.6) | 15.7 (60.3) | 11.6 (52.9) | 6.2 (43.2) | 2.7 (36.9) | 10.3 (50.6) |
| Average precipitation mm (inches) | 77 (3.0) | 67 (2.6) | 86 (3.4) | 86 (3.4) | 106 (4.2) | 95 (3.7) | 90 (3.5) | 115 (4.5) | 89 (3.5) | 120 (4.7) | 106 (4.2) | 68 (2.7) | 1,105 (43.4) |
| Average precipitation days (≥ 1.0 mm) | 7 | 6 | 8 | 9 | 11 | 10 | 7 | 8 | 6 | 8 | 9 | 6 | 95 |
Source 1: Istituto Superiore per la Protezione e la Ricerca Ambientale
Source 2: Enea-Casaccia (precipitation) Climi e viaggi (precipitation days)

=== Fauna and flora ===
Lake Garda is rich in biodiversity. Salmo carpio, also known as the carpione (carpione del Garda or Lake Garda carpione) is a rare salmonid fish endemic to Lake Garda. It has been introduced to a number of other lakes in Italy and elsewhere but unsuccessfully in all cases. The population in Lake Garda has been strongly declining, and is considered critically endangered (IUCN 3.1). The main threats are due to overfishing, pollution and possibly competition from introduced species such as Coregonus and other Salmonidae.

Adult lake trout outside the mating season are silvery with very few black spots on the body and almost none on the head. During the mating season, some males develop a dark mottled body colouration. Garda lake trout reach a length of up to 50 centimetres (20 inches). They live primarily in depths of 100 to 200 metres (330 to 660 feet). They feed on zooplankton and bottom-dwelling crustaceans in summer. Males and females reach sexual maturity at two or three years. The mating takes place every one to two years. The spawning takes place in 50 to 300 metres (160 to 980 feet) depth in the vicinity of underwater springs. The maximum age is five years.

Areas around Lake Garda, inhabited since prehistoric times, are an environment of great naturalistic value, with vegetation typical of the Mediterranean climate such as olive trees, vines, lemon trees, agave and other plants, which thrive thanks to the microclimate created by the Garda basin, which makes winter particularly mild. During the spring wildflowers such as primroses, iris, violets and red lilies are born, while in summer some bloom varieties of wild orchids. Thanks to the presence of protected areas, hares and small wild mammals, water birds and birds of prey survive, while ponds and ditches are populated by pike, carp and eels. The herds of cattle, horses and other domestic animals give a bucolic aspect to the hilly landscape.

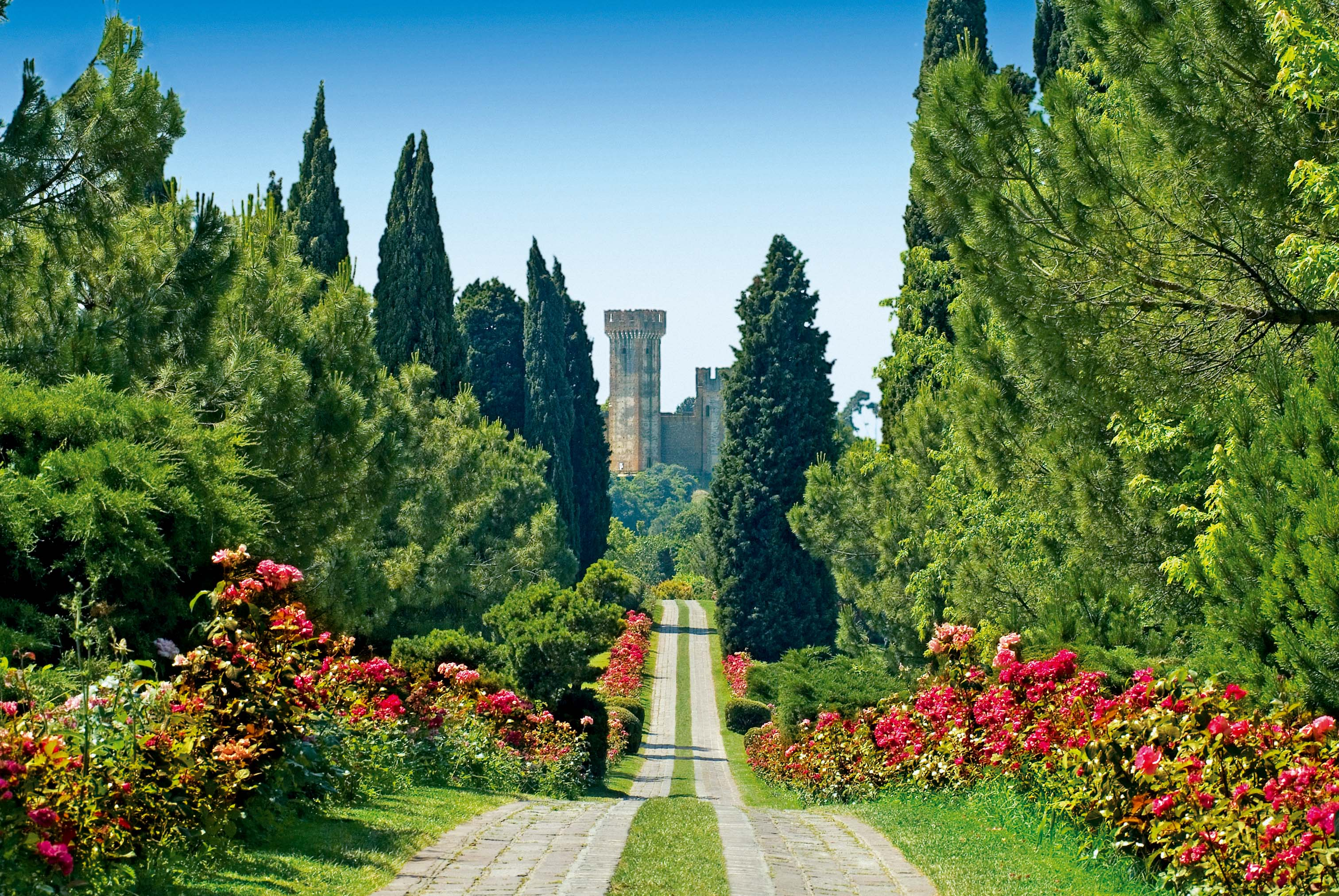
Parco Giardino Sigurtà is a naturalistic park that is home to many different species of plants and flowers.

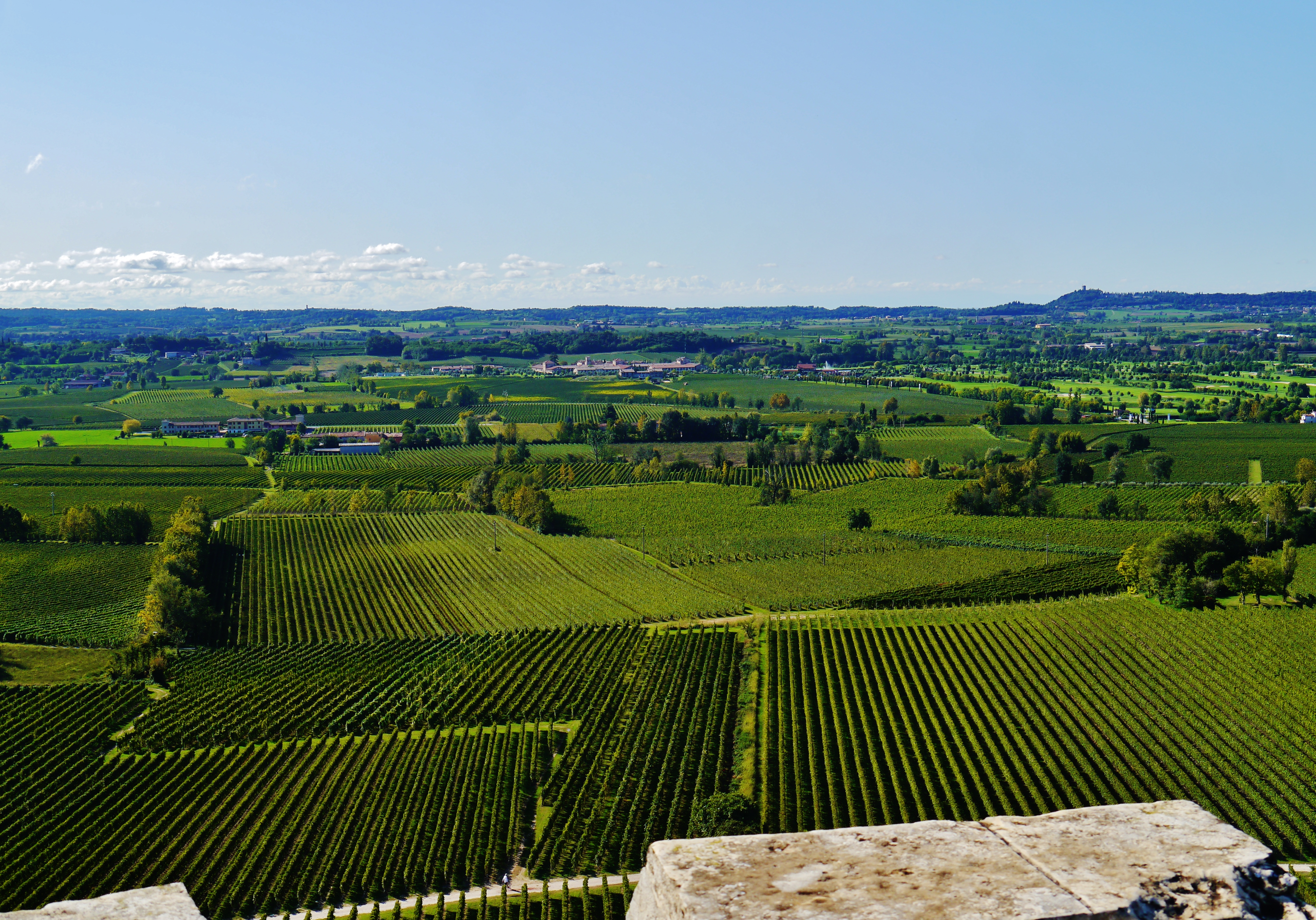
Countryside around Desenzano. Vines are common in the southern part of the Lake.

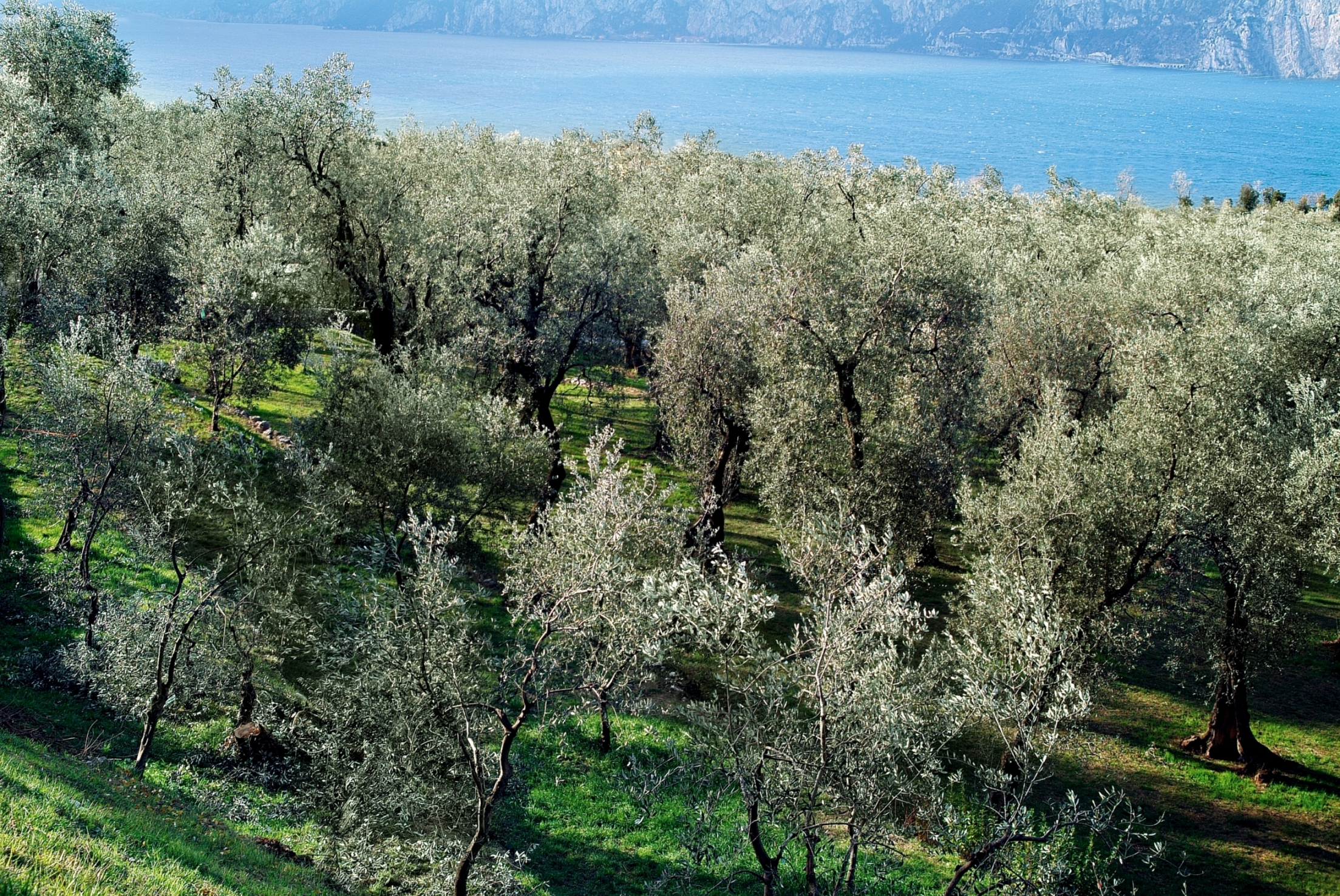
Olive trees

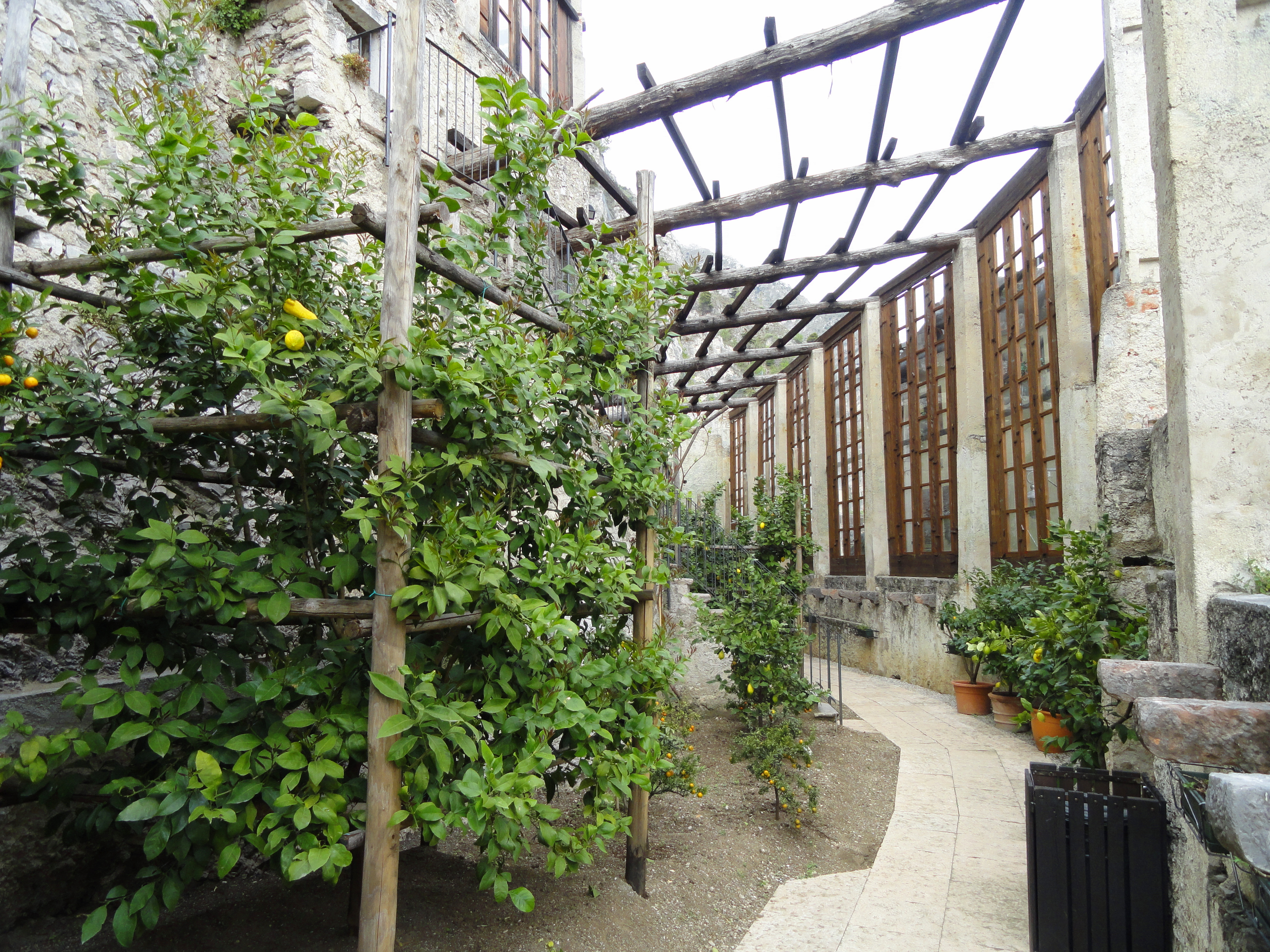
Lemon trees in Limone

== History ==
Traces of human presence around the lake have been found related to the Middle Paleolithic, in particular flint tools, but only above certain altitudes, as at lower altitudes, the actions of the glaciers have cancelled all the clues that could have proved the presence of man. There are some signs of encampments from Upper Paleolithic, in particular on the slopes of Monte Baldo and Stivo. In the Neolithic the populations that inhabited the lake came into contact with the square-mouthed vases culture, as evidenced by the objects accompanying some tombs from this period found near Arco.

=== Bronze and Iron ages ===
The greatest evidence of human presence in prehistoric times dates back to the Bronze Age, when numerous aggregates of stilt houses arose in the lower lake before being abandoned during the Iron Age in favour of more strategic points. Lake Garda was a meeting point between the populations of Reti and Veneti, whose presence is testified in particular by the necropolis of Garda, as well as that of the Etruscans who came to trade in these areas. Also plausible is the presence of the Cenomani, who would have settled in the area between Brescia and the lake around the 6th century BC, leaving their traces mostly in the Lombard toponymy.

=== Roman times ===
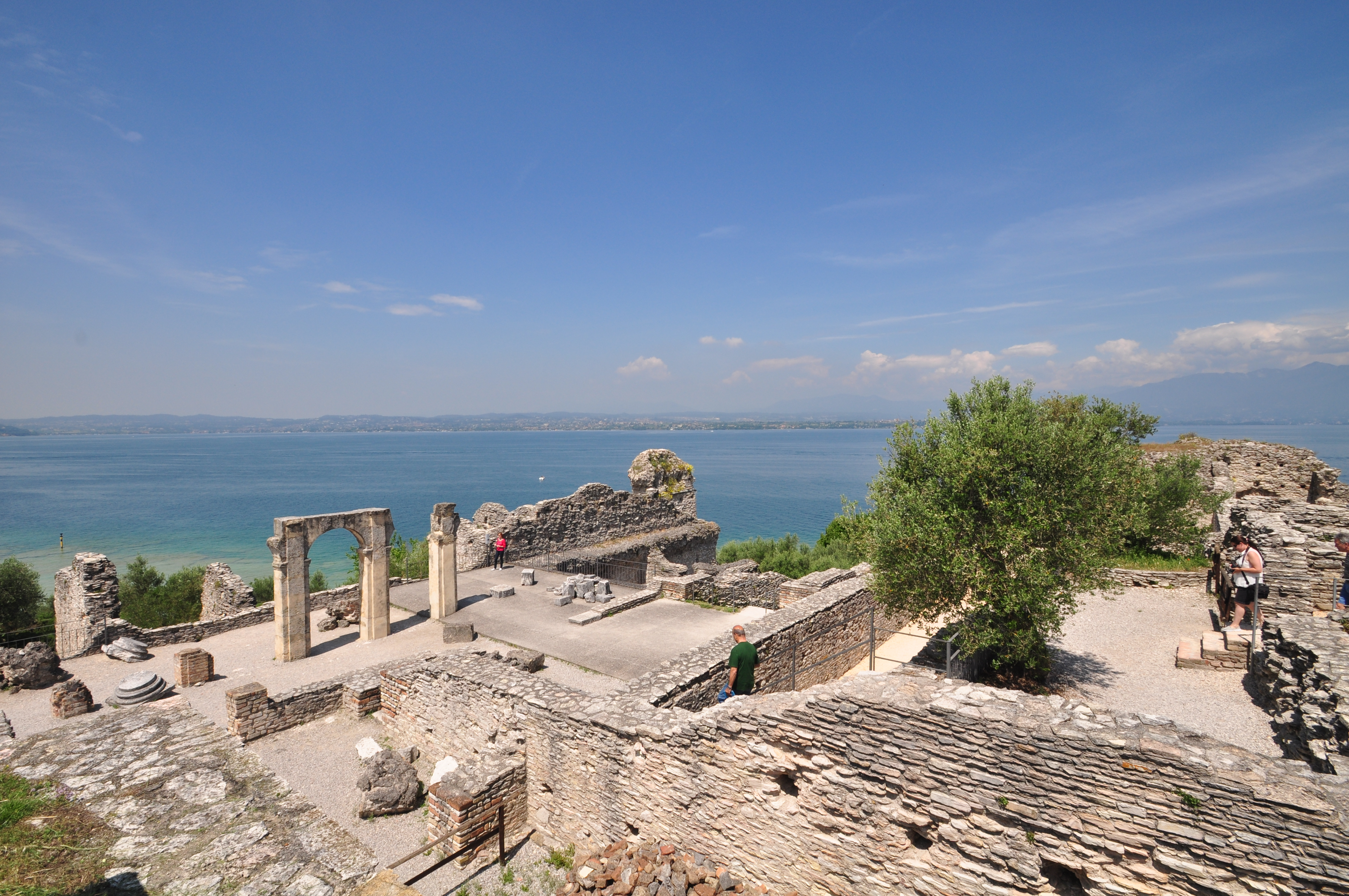
Grottoes of Catullus in Sirmione

The integration between Romans and Cenomani, who controlled the Garda area, probably began in 225 BC, when there was a treaty of alliance between Cenomani, Veneti and Romans, even if the actual Romanization of the territory took place between the 2nd and 1st centuries BC. In 89 BC the rights of Latin cities were granted to the Garda areas by the will of the Roman consul Gnaeus Pompeius Strabo, while forty years later Roman citizenship was finally granted to Brixia (whose countryside included the western and northern banks of the Benaco) and Verona (which instead included the eastern shore). During the 1st century AD many roads were built, such as the via Gallica, which connected Verona to Milan passing through Peschiera (the ancient Arilica), and the via Claudia Augusta, which connected the plain with the Resia pass and therefore the northernmost territories, as well as some minor roads that connected the Adige valley with the Garda. Two pagi were also established: pagus Benacenses on Brescia and pagus Claudienses on Verona.

In 268 AD the Battle of Lake Benacus was fought between the army of the Roman Empire, commanded by the future emperor Claudius Gothicus, and the German federation of the Alamanni. The overwhelming victory obtained by the Romans allowed the expulsion of Alemanni from northern Italy, due to the very serious losses they suffered during the battle.

The Roman presence is amply testified also by settlements, villas (in particular the notes Grottoes of Catullus), by the remains of centuriation still visible today, by the remains of sanctuaries, tombstones and epigraphic testimonies.

=== Middle Ages ===
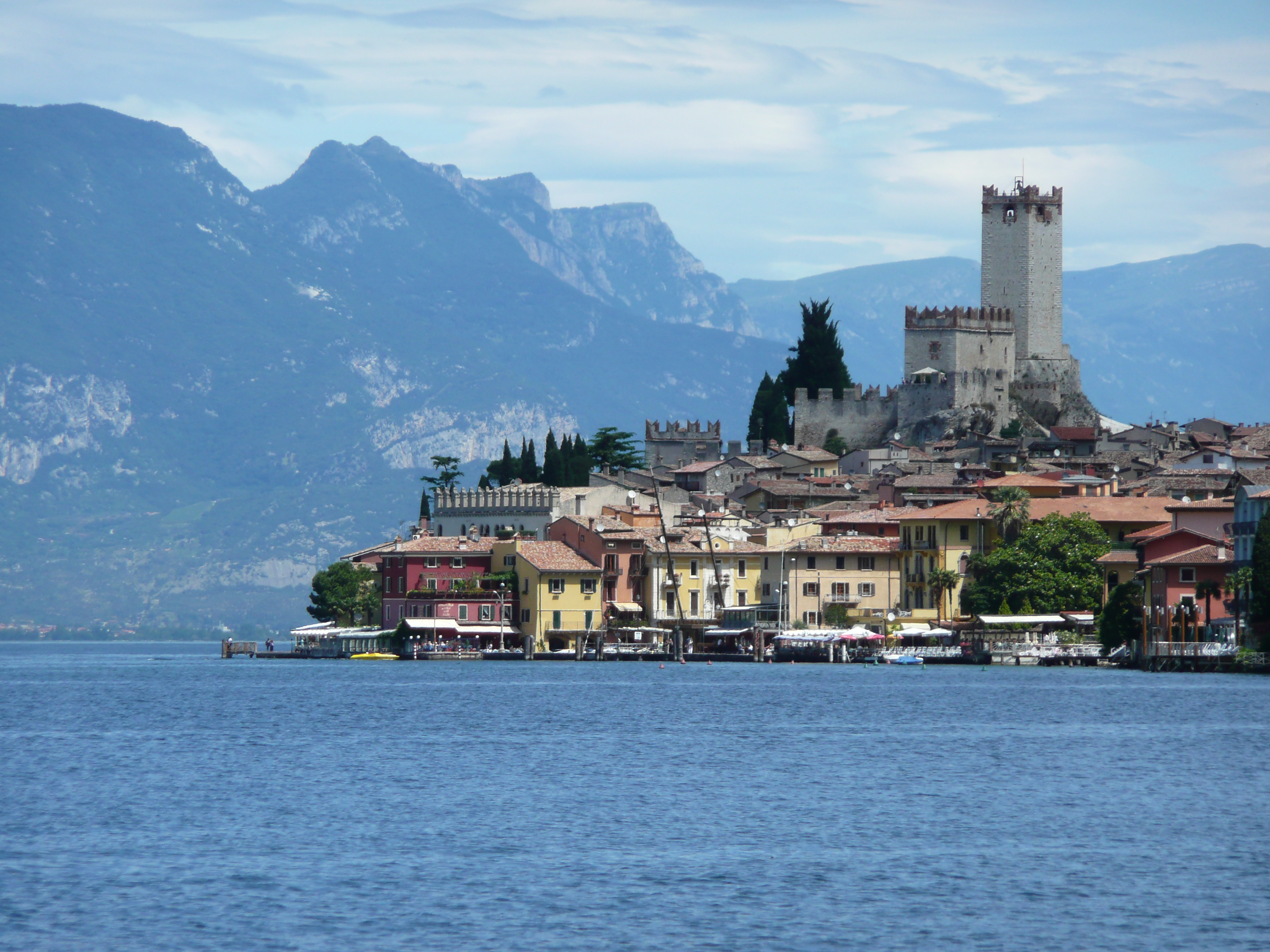
Scaliger Castle of Malcesine

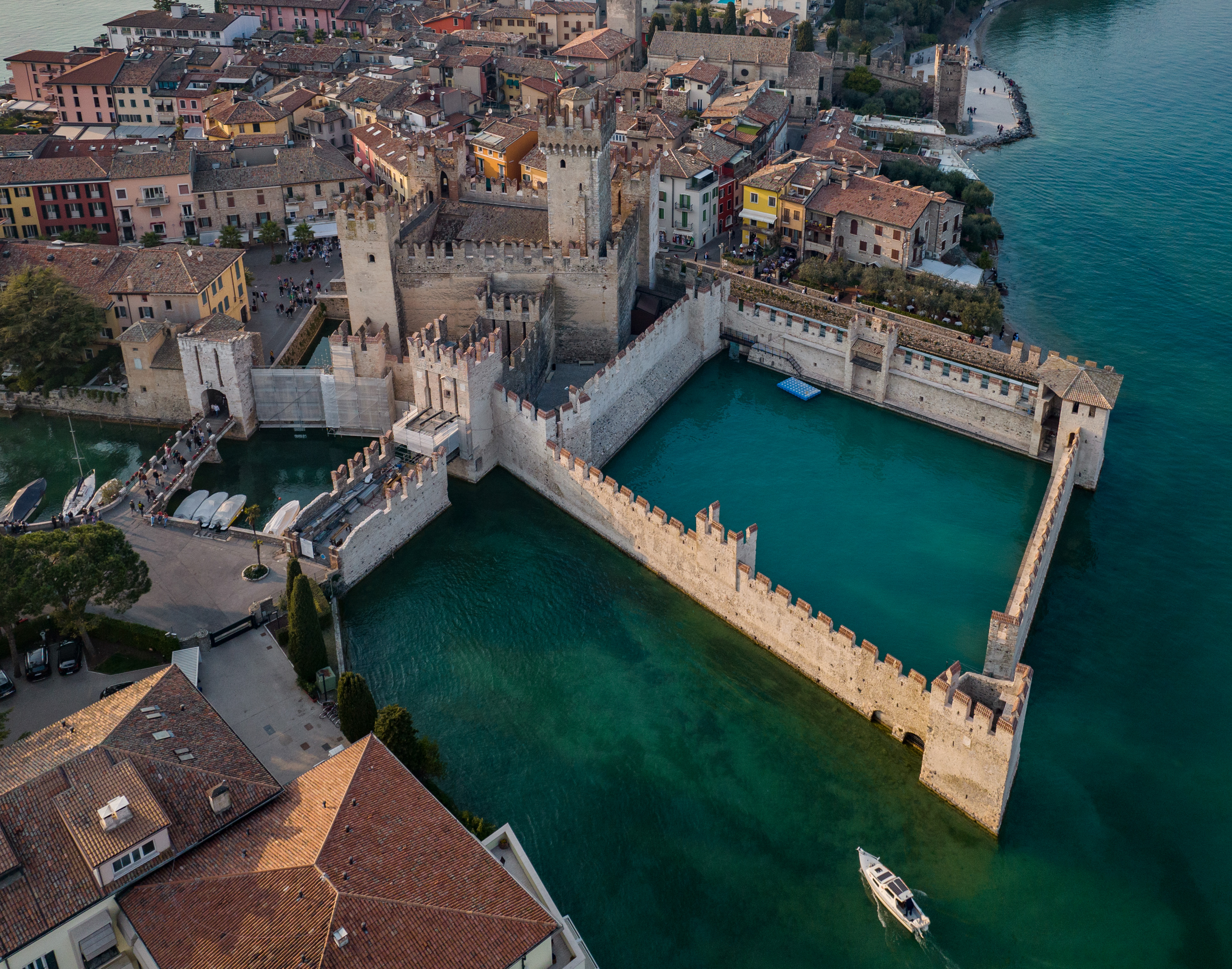
Scaliger Castle of Sirmione

In the Middle Ages Lake Garda was described by Dante in his Divine Comedy:

Suso in Italia bella giace un laco,
a piè de l'Alpe che serra Lamagna
sovra Tiralli, c'ha nome Benaco.

Translation:

Above in beauteous Italy lies a lake,
At the Alp's foot that shuts in Germany
Over Tyrol, and has the name Benaco.

After the collapse of the Roman Empire, the Garda region witnessed the passage of numerous Germanic populations, but the first one that settled there, after a long migration, was that of the Lombards. Their testimonies are mostly present along the southern and eastern shores, preferred to other areas due to their strategic importance: from here it was possible to control both the waterways of Garda and Mincio, and the Adige valley. During the Lombard hegemony, there was a first administrative reorganization, as well as the definitive Christianization of the area, begun in the previous centuries by Vigilius of Trent and Zeno of Verona. The lake remained on the border between three powerful Lombard duchies: Brescia, Verona and Trento.

The first documents that testify the presence of a Fines Gardenses, an entity with its own officials for the administration of justice, even if not autonomous with respect to the Count of Verona, date back to 825, while after the year 1000 county of Garda was established by the emperor Henry II. Starting from the 11th century, towns around the lake began to develop a differentiated policy compared to that of the major centres of influence – Brescia, Verona and Trento – and this greater autonomy meant that many centres became free communities. These possessed comfortable economic conditions compared to the inland countries and a strong social awareness and sense of community.

In the 13th century, however, the rule of the Scaliger family was established and they soon subdued the eastern shore of the lake. The Scaliger built numerous defensive constructions, in particular, they built the castles of Sirmione, Malcesine and Riva, reinforced the port structures of Lazise and Torri del Benaco, and built a great defense system called Serraglio, the only one of its kind in Italy. This fortified system, completed by Cangrande II in 1355, included isolated castles in Ponti sul Mincio and Monzambano, serious continuous and uninterrupted castles and towers connected by defensive walls starting from the fortress of Valeggio sul Mincio and then continuing up to Nogarole Rocca. The Seraglio remained practically intact until the mid-19th century when it was partially dismantled.

=== Early modern history ===
In 1387, following the defeat of Antonio della Scala, the whole Garda area was subjected to the Visconti; as early as 1405 the eastern shore passed into the hands of the Republic of Venice, while the western shore remained afflicted by the struggles between Guelphs and Ghibellines. In 1426 the Visconti lost Brescia and the western shore of the lake, which thus passed into the hands of Venice: gathered under the flag of the Republic of Venice, the 34 Benacense municipalities obtained ample autonomy. The war returned in 1438, due to the struggle between Venice and Milan: an exceptional event, remembered with the name of Galeas per montes, was the passage of a fleet composed of six galleys and twenty-five ships on the slopes of Monte Baldo, pulled by 2,000 oxen. This fleet sailed on Adige and almost reached Rovereto, from where it was transported to Lake Garda by land through the valley of Lake Loppio. The fleet was then used to counter the Milanese one and had its greatest success in a battle at Riva del Garda, which was followed by the capitulation of the city.

In 1508 the League of Cambrai was formed against Venice who then strengthened the castles of its mainland domains, including those of Salò and Padenghe, and sent several galleys to the lake, as well as having new ones built directly on Lake Garda. During the war the Venetians lost part of their domains which were however recovered in 1512. In 1516 emperor Maximilian I came to Italy and the lake returned to German hands again, allowing Venice to recover the lost territories.

In 1796 the territories of the Venetian Republic were involved in the Napoleonic Wars: at the end of May, the French advanced to the lake and defeated the Austrians at Borghetto sul Mincio, conquering Peschiera. At the end of July, the French were defeated and had to retreat beyond Salò, which was then occupied by the Austrians. Numerous clashes took place between the adversaries on the battlefield of Lake Garda. In 1797 the French occupied Mantua, while Brescia valleys and towns on the lake rose up against the Napoleonic forces, even if the Republic of Venice maintained its neutral status and did not send aid to rescue. The Veronese, on the other hand, autonomously organized expeditions against the centres occupied by the French, but were defeated and forced to retreat to Verona, where on 17 April the anti-French insurrections called "Pasque Veronesi" (Pasque Veronesi) began. ". On 17 October the Treaty of Campoformio was signed: the southwestern shores went to the French, while the north-eastern ones went to the Austrians. In 1799 the war continued until the following year the lake returned to French hands: it became part of the Cisalpine Republic (later transformed into Italian Republic and then again in Kingdom of Italy, always under French control.

In 1815 following the definitive defeat of Napoleon Bonaparte, during the Congress of Vienna it was decided to create the Kingdom of Lombardy–Venetia: in this way, the whole Garda region returned to Austrian hands.

=== Later modern and contemporary history ===
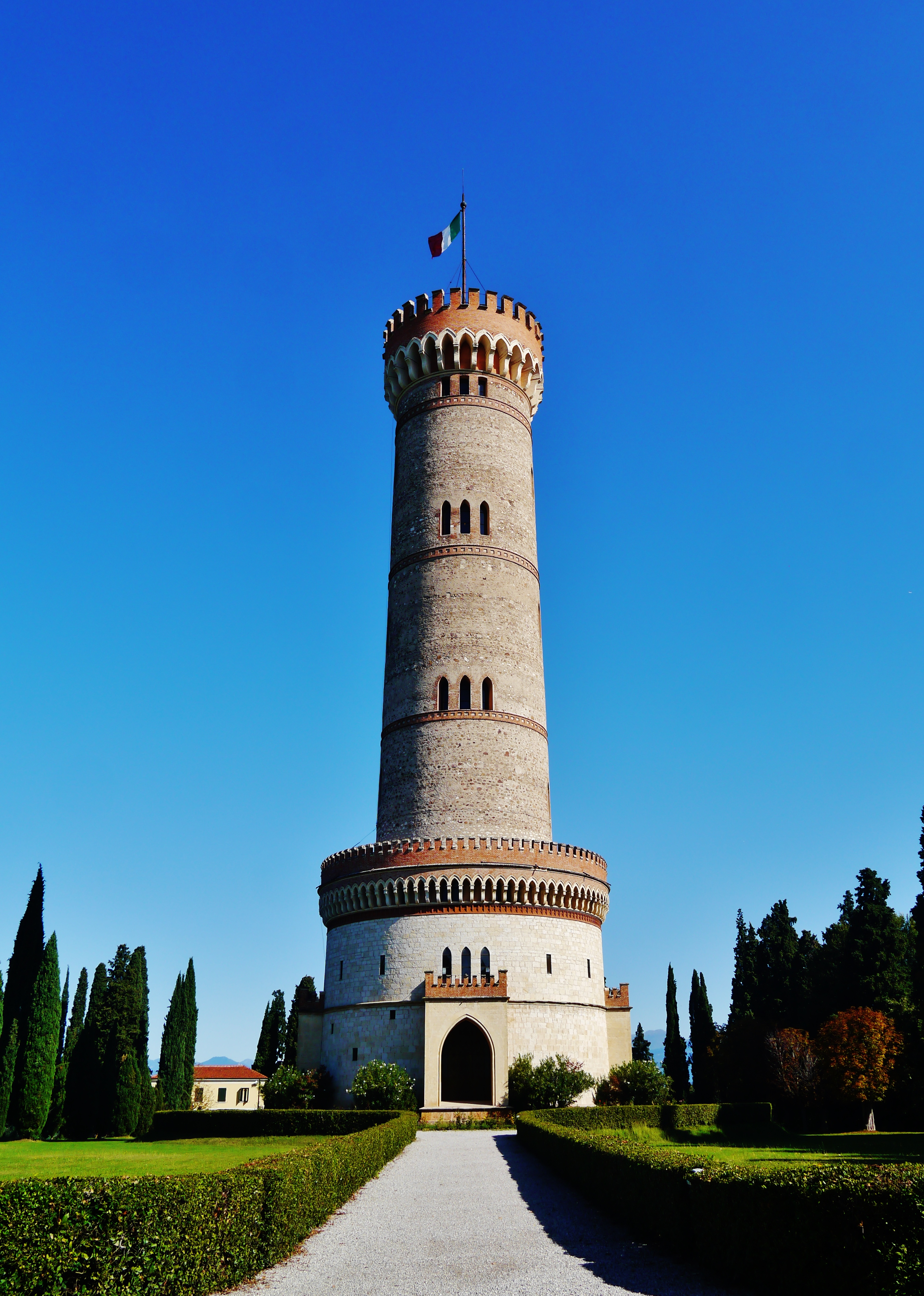
Tower of San Martino della Battaglia, built on the site of the battle of San Martino, part of battle of Solferino (1859)

The First Italian War of Independence saw an initial slow advance of the Piedmontese army towards the lake: at the news of its approach, Salò rebelled against the Austrians, several soldiers were taken prisoner and the Austrian insignia demolished. During the events also Riva del Garda and several towns on the Veronese side rose up. The Austrian army was forced to retreat to the Mincio line due to the advance of the Piedmontese troops and on 4 April the Austrians were driven out of Lonato and Desenzano, while the Piedmontese attempt to conquer Peschiera was unsuccessful. After the Piedmontese defeat of Custoza the pre-war status quo was restored. In 1859 the Second War of Independence began; on 18 June the Hunters of the Alps managed to enter Salò, from where Giuseppe Garibaldi wanted to leave to continue the advance towards Veneto crossing the lake with some boats, but new orders forced him to move the troops in the Brescia valleys. However, the Italian troops managed to sink an Austrian steamship before leaving Salò. Shortly after the battle of Solferino and San Martino was won by the Franco-Savoyards and Peschiera was besieged. With the armistice of Villafranca the war was put to an end: Garda returned to be a land border, on this occasion between Italians and Austrians. During the Third War of Independence Garibaldi returned to Salò again and from there he invaded Trentino. Meanwhile, the Austrians repeatedly bombarded Gargnano and tried to impose their dominance. Despite the humiliating Italian defeat, in 1866 Veneto was finally handed over to the Kingdom of Italy, except for the northern part of the lake which still remained under Austrian control.

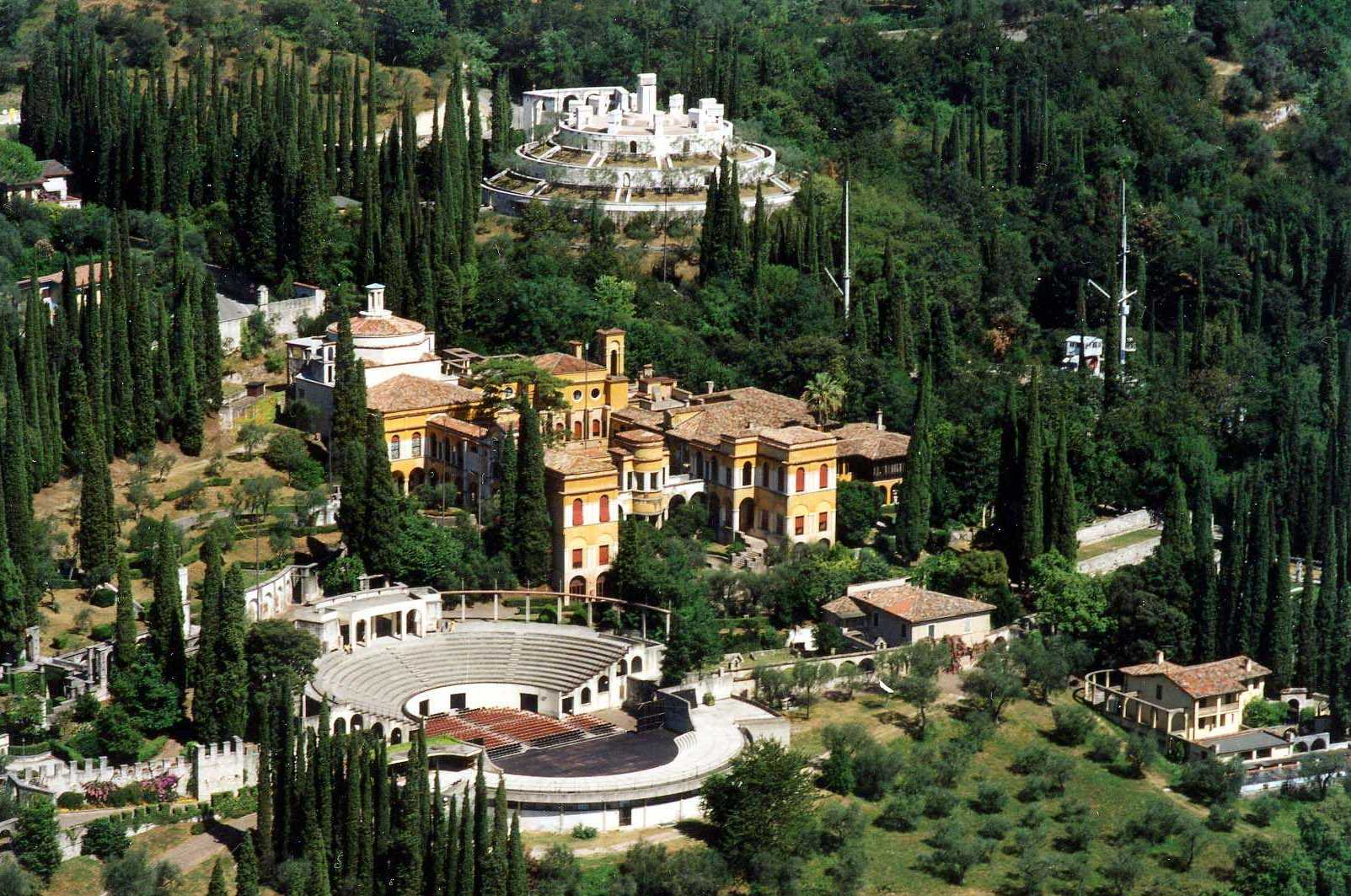
Areal view of Vittoriale degli Italiani

During the First World War towns on Lake Garda were attacked by aerial bombardment several times. The first took place on 23 July 1915, when Riva del Garda was hit. The steamers of the lake were requisitioned by the Italian army and were re-equipped as warships. The following year some guns and artillery batteries were installed, but on 20 February 1916, Riva was hit again by air. The following day three Austrian planes bombed Desenzano, while on 27 February bombs fell in Nago and Torbole. In 1918 Riva was bombed again. Later Limone and, once again, Riva were targeted, but with the end of the war, Trentino was also passed into Italian hands.

In the period between the two wars the poet Gabriele D'Annunzio settled in Gardone Riviera, where the "Vittoriale degli Italiani", his residence and now a museum, would later be built.

Until 1943 the events of Second World War did not particularly affect the lake region, but following the birth of the Italian Social Republic (a German puppet state and Fascist Italian rump state), the German command settled in Limone and, on 10 October, that of Benito Mussolini in Gargnano. The Ministry of Defense was located in Desenzano; the Ministry of Foreign Affairs, the Ministry of Popular Culture and the press agencies settled in Salò, which became the capital of the newborn Fascist Italy. Fasano was the seat of the German embassy and Gardone of the Japanese one, while the Ministry of the Interior and the seat of the Republican Fascist Party (PFR) found accommodation in Maderno. The upper part of the lake was also occupied militarily by the Wehrmacht. In April 1945 the lake was freed by the Allies and later became part of the Republic of Italy. The award-winning documentary film The Lost Mountaineers looks at the tragic events that happened in the last days of the war in northern Lake Garda.

== Myth and legend ==
According to the Greco-Roman mythology, the River Mincius was the child of the Lake Benacus.

In ancient German Sagas, Garda was home to Ortnit.

== Towns and villages on the lake ==
Around Lake Garda there are 26 comuni, the most populated being Desenzano del Garda (29,179 inhabitants), followed by Arco (17,857) and Riva del Garda (17,518).

Comuni of Lake Garda
| Lombardy | Veneto | Trentino-Alto Adige/Südtirol |
| Province of Brescia (clockwise: south to north) | Province of Verona (clockwise: north to south) | Autonomous Province of Trento (clockwise: west to east) |
|---|---|---|
| Sirmione; Desenzano del Garda; Lonato del Garda; Padenghe sul Garda; Moniga del Garda; Manerba del Garda; San Felice del Benaco; Salò; Gardone Riviera; Toscolano-Maderno; Gargnano; Tignale; Tremosine; Limone sul Garda | Malcesine; Brenzone; Torri del Benaco; Garda; Bardolino; Lazise; Castelnuovo del Garda; Peschiera del Garda | Riva del Garda; Arco; Nago–Torbole |

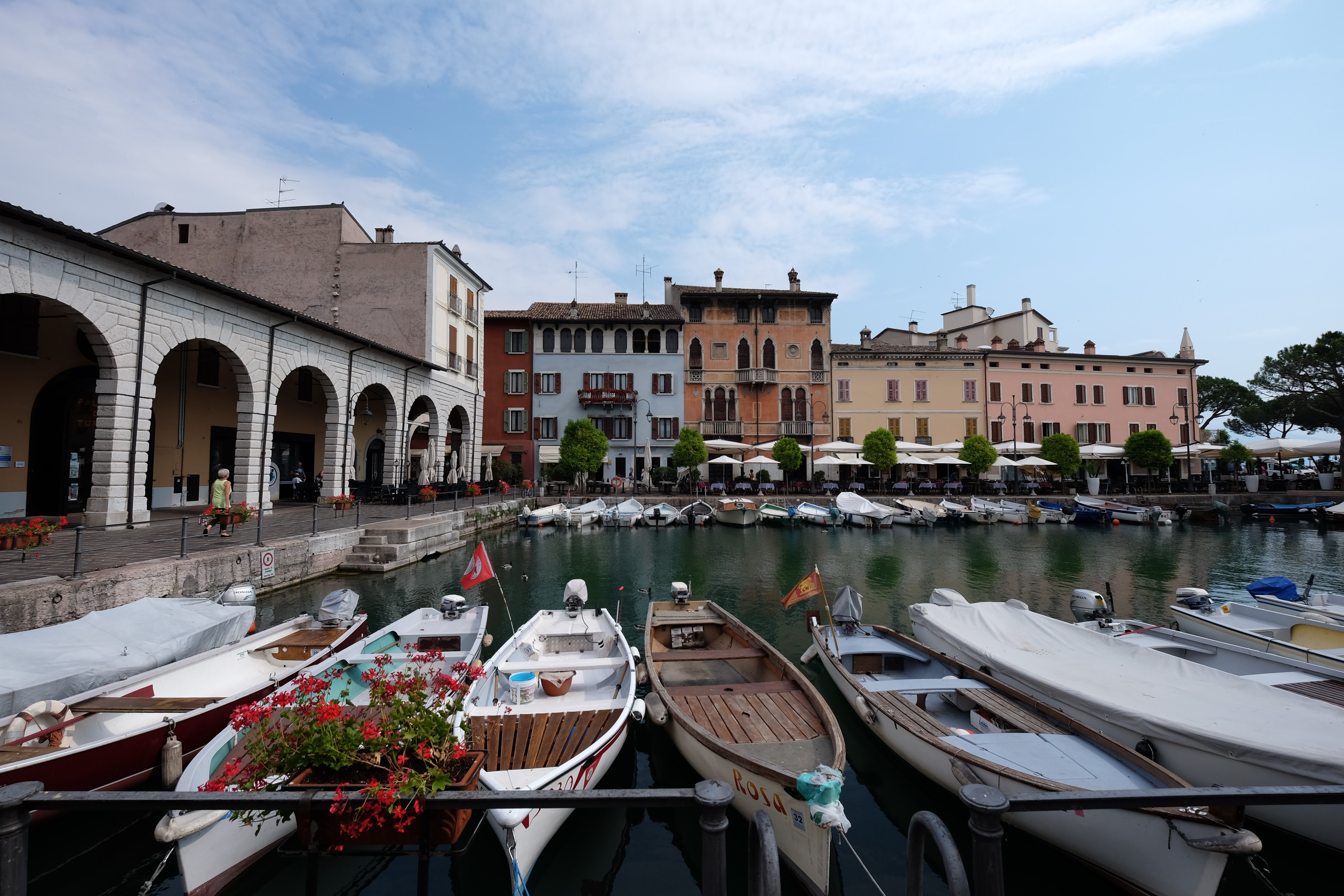
Desenzano

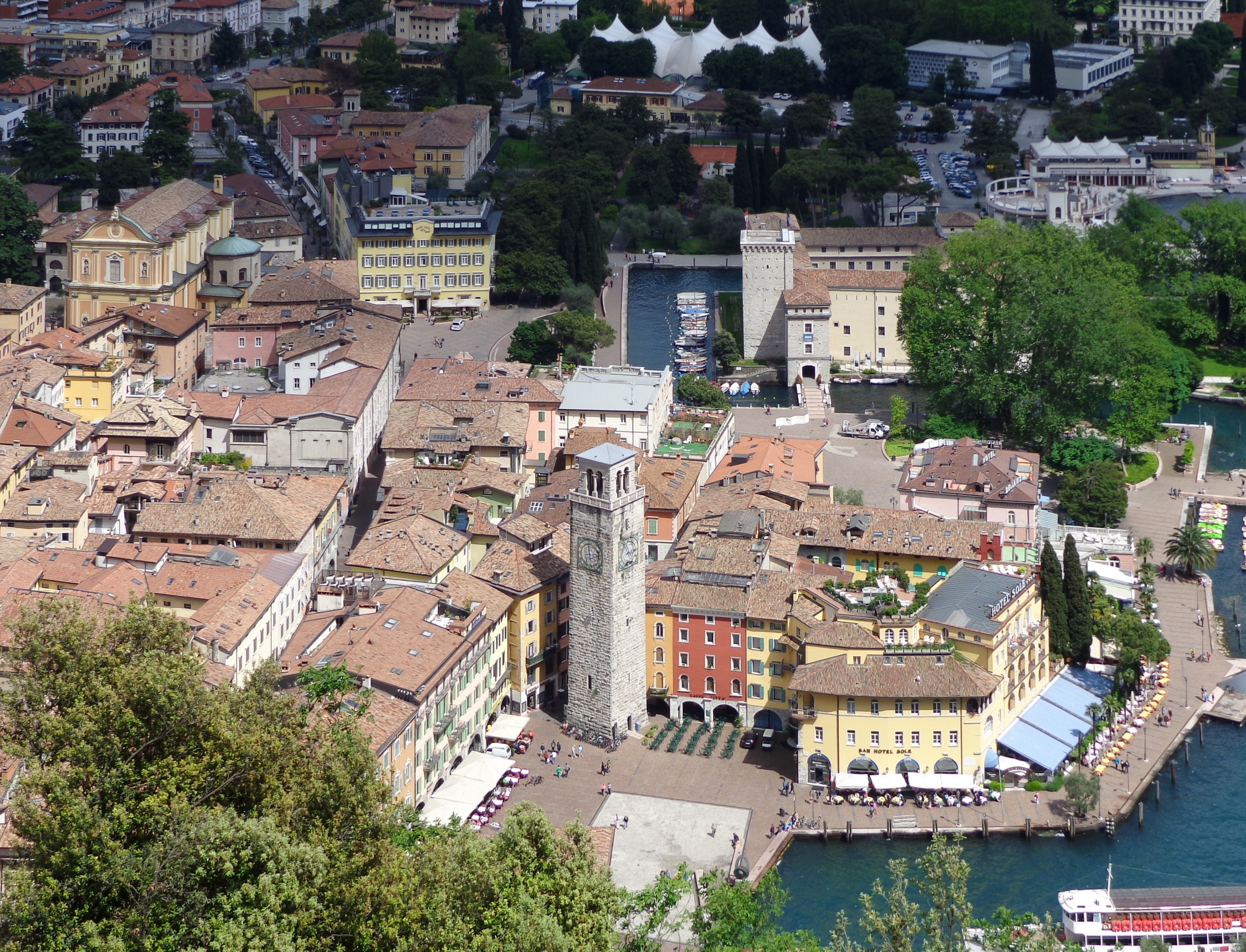
Riva

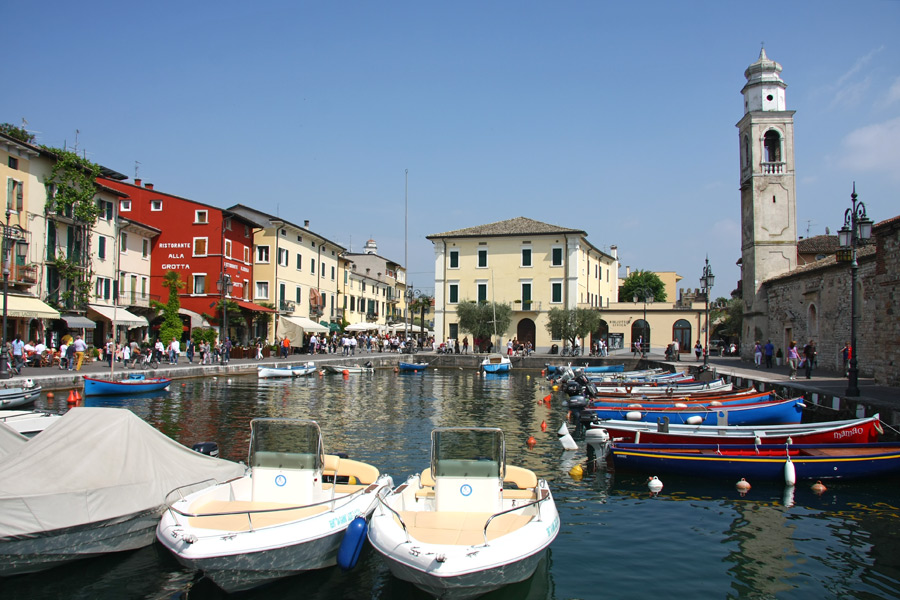
Lazise

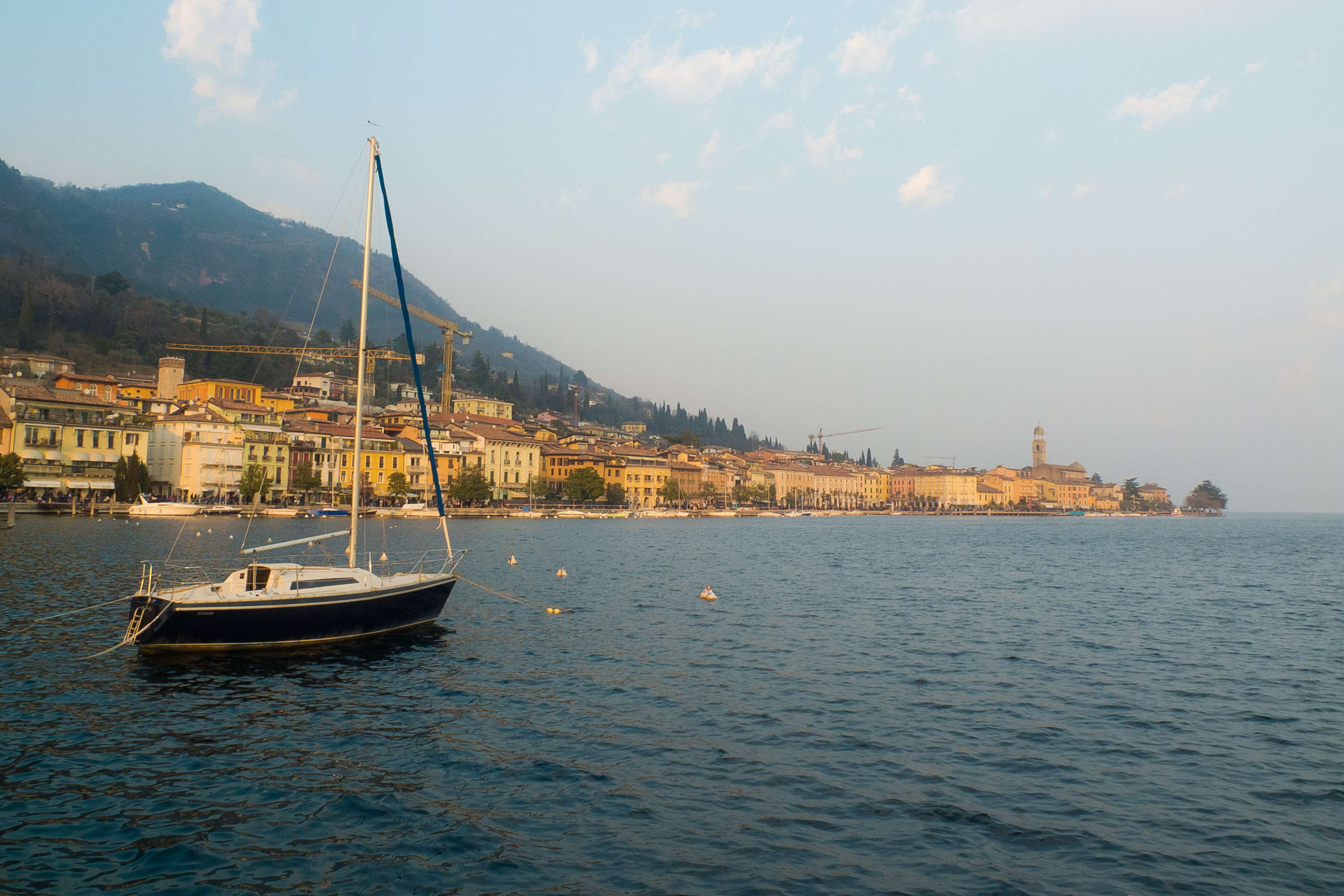
Salò

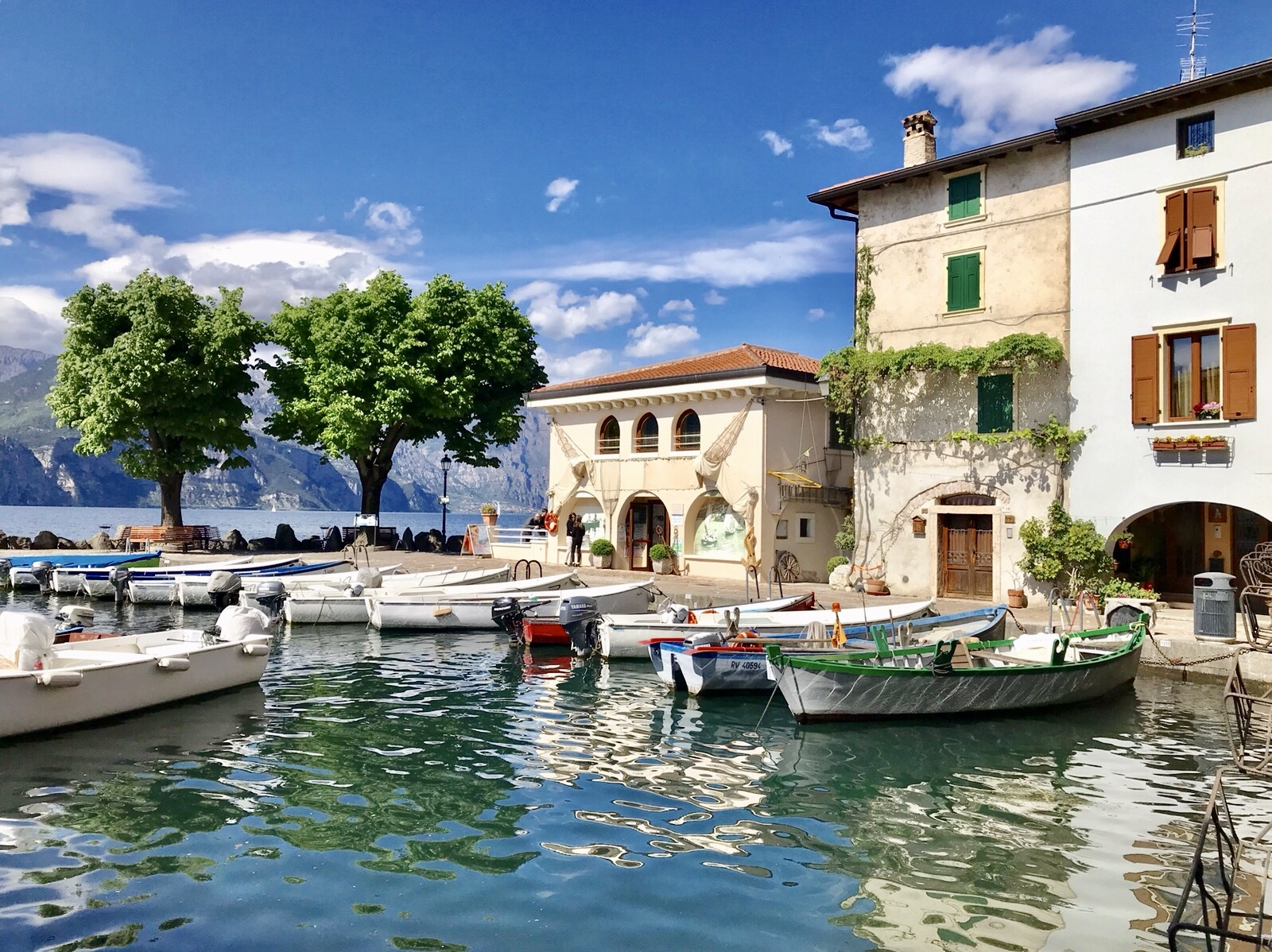
Malcesine

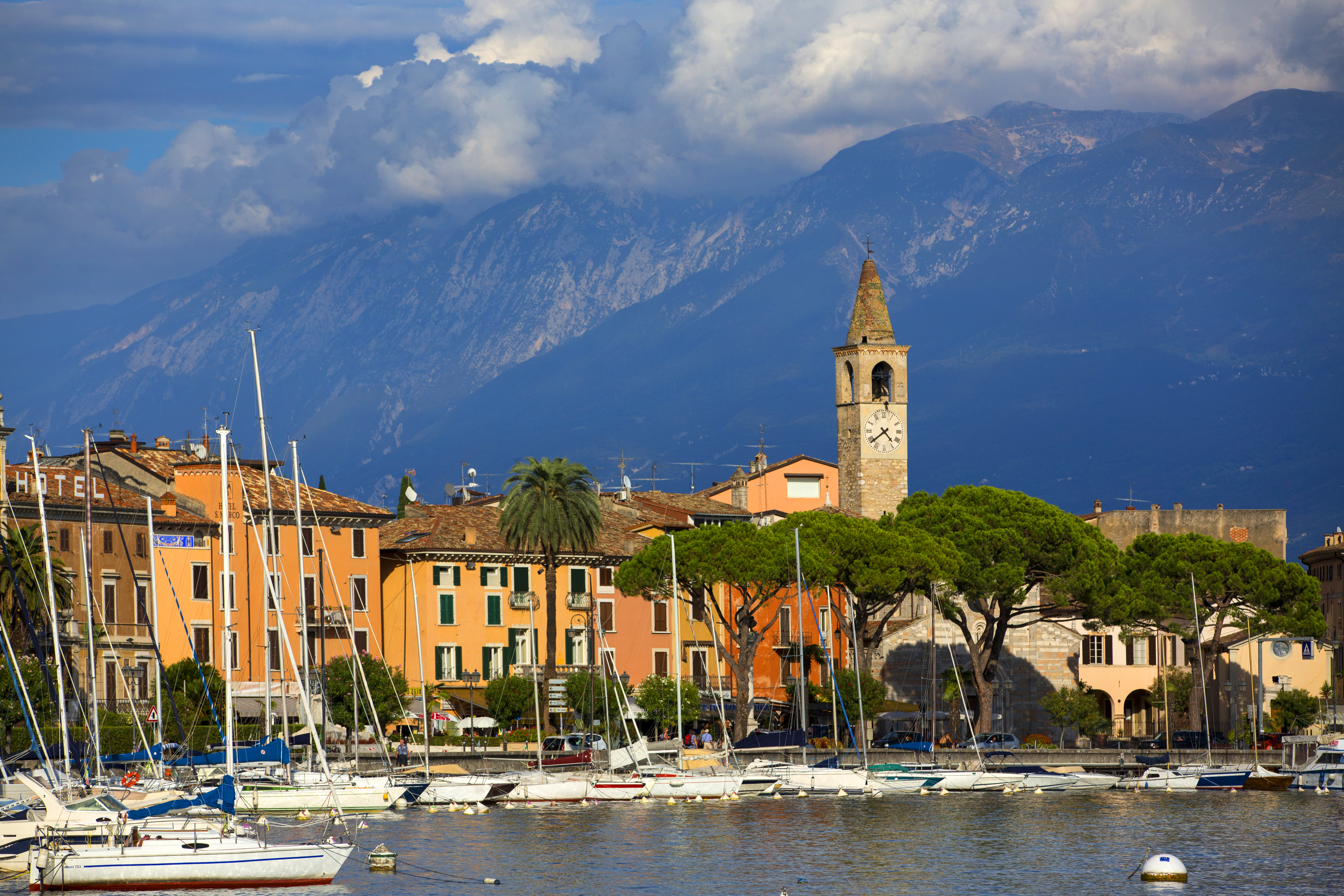
Toscolano Maderno

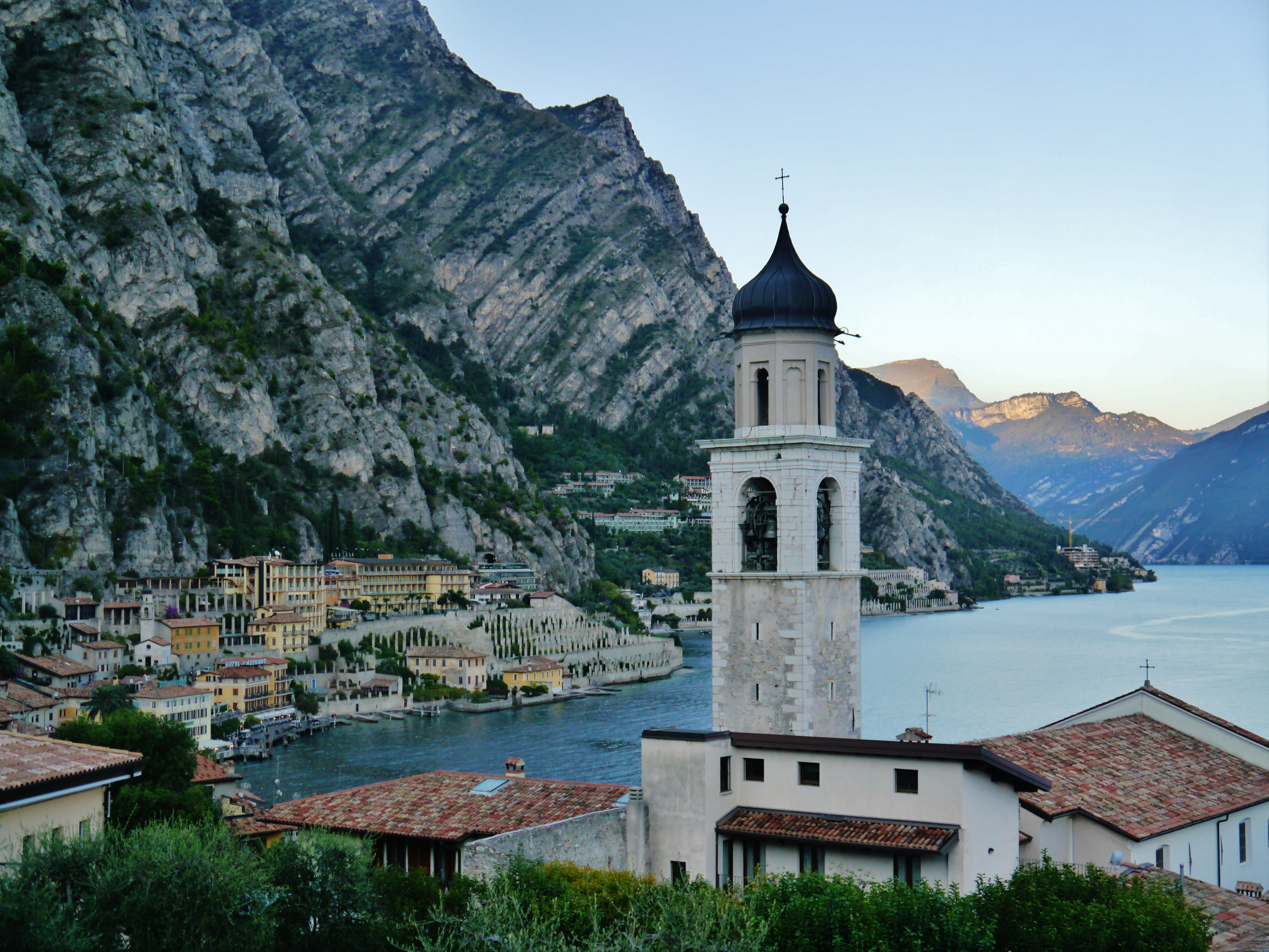
Limone

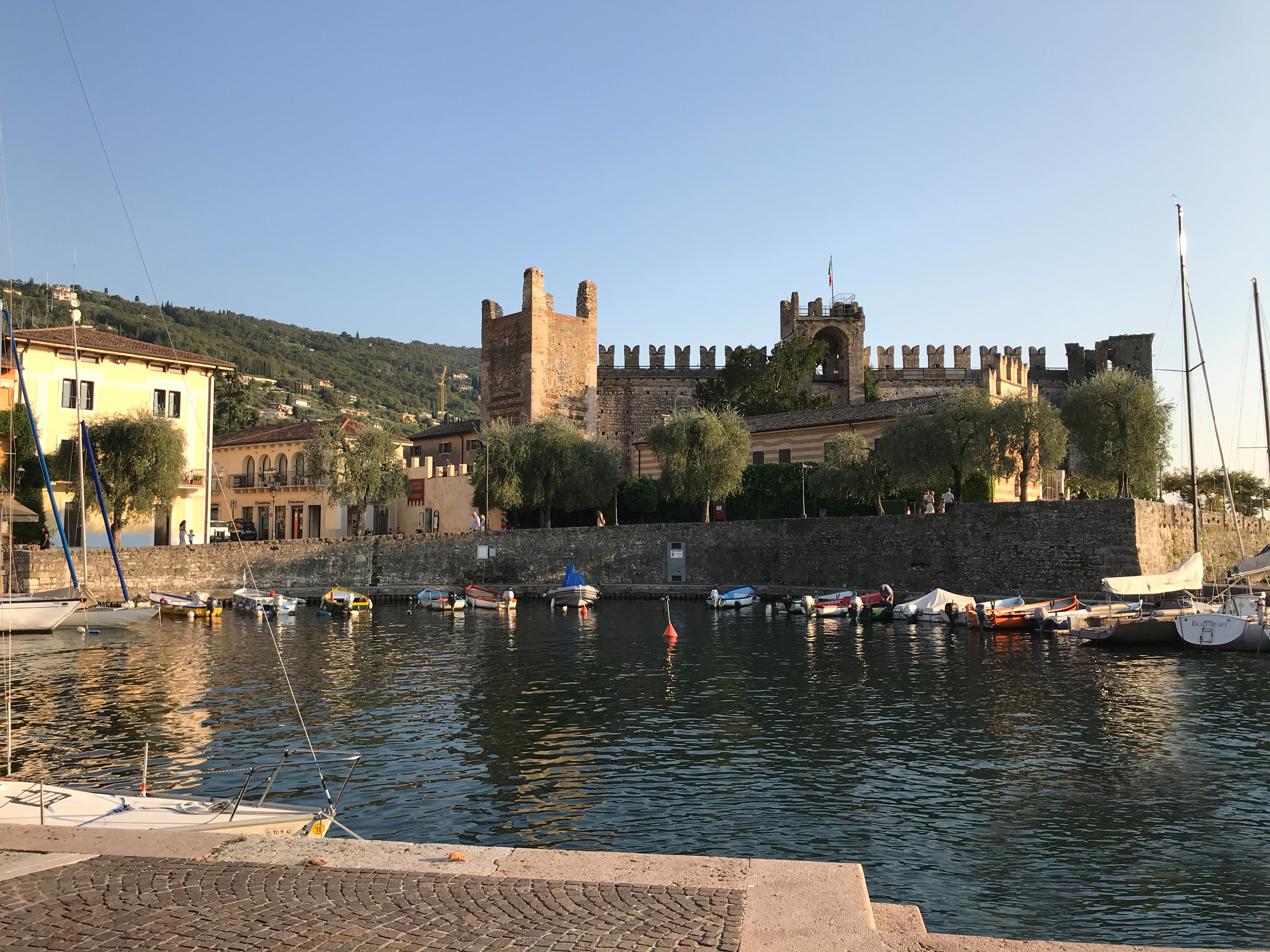
Torri del Benaco

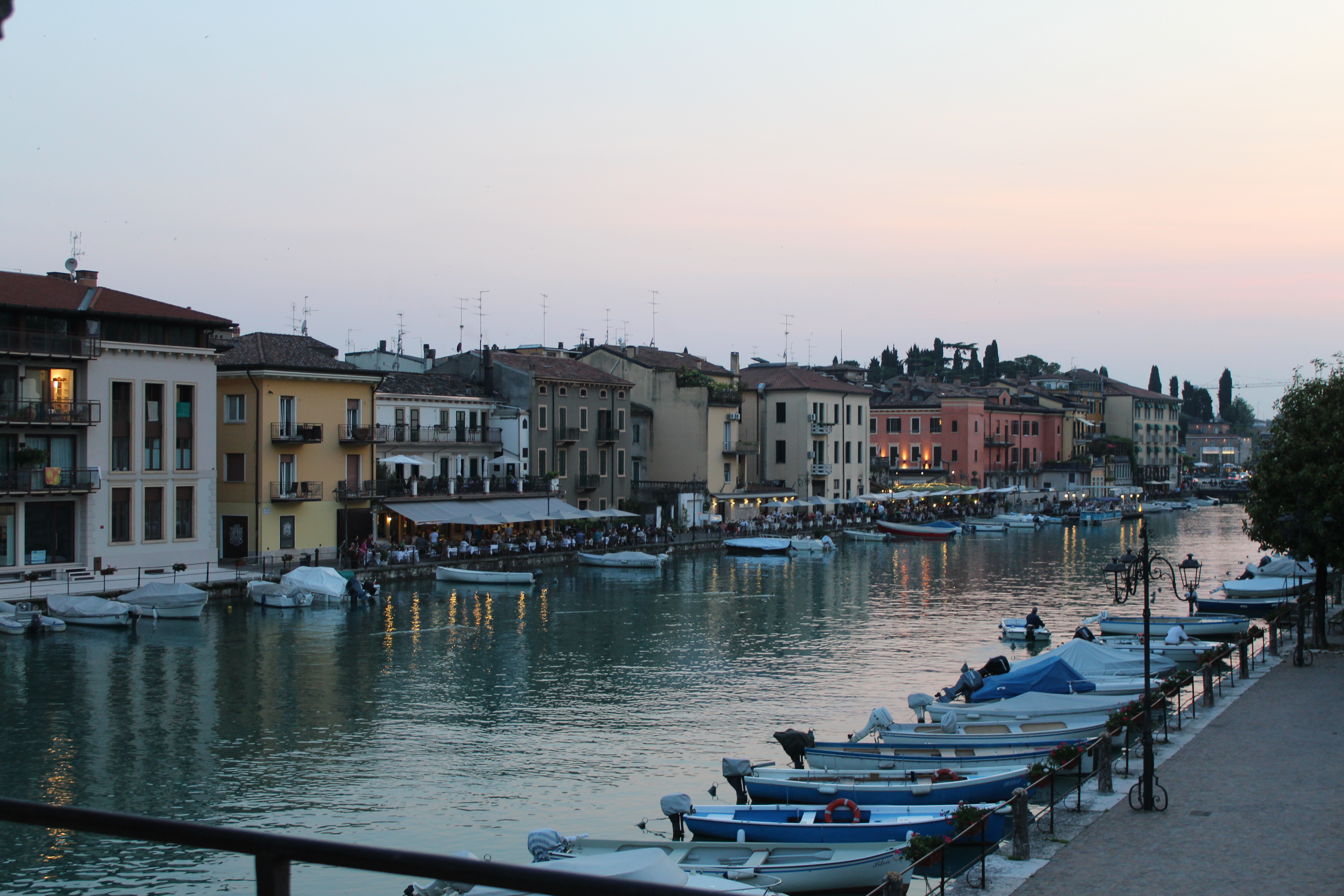
Peschiera

== Economy ==
=== Tourism ===
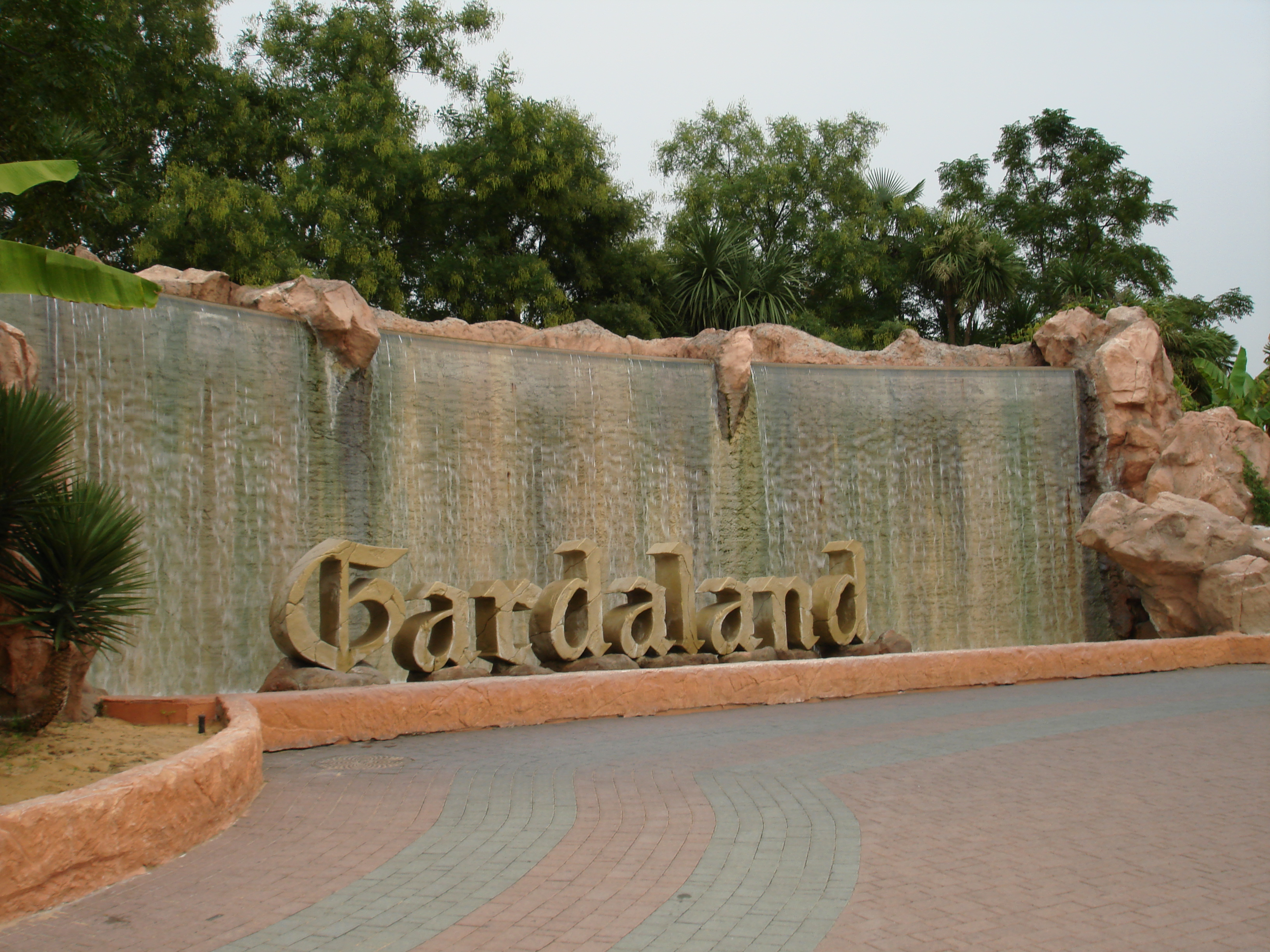
Gardaland, the most visited theme park in Italy

Garda's economy is mostly dependent on tourism. Back to Roman times, especially from the early imperial age, magnificent villas were present on the shores of the lake, conceived as places dedicated to otium, an activity actually reserved for the ruling classes. In particular Sirmione was a privileged place for the presence of sulphurous springs that allowed thermal use. Starting from the Renaissance the lake returned to be populated with noble villas.

Tourism in the modern conception of the term, however, developed from the end of the 19th century, when elite tourism concerned almost exclusively the north-western area of the lake. One of the first tourist resorts was Gardone Riviera, where the first small hotel was built. Expanded over time, it became one of the buildings that made up the luxurious Grand Hotel Gardone Riviera. Restaurant Gardone Riviera remains an internationally renown destination restaurant, known for its lake views and pasta dishes.

In vicinity of Hotel Gardone Riviera other small hotels and villas slowly arose and, after the poet Gabriele D'Annunzio had the Vittoriale degli Italiani built here, the fame of the place grew further. On the Veronese shore, tourism arrived much later, around the 1930s, when the current Strada Gardesana Orientale was built along the shores of the lake. With the arrival of tourists, "lakeside promenades" were planned. Since the 1950s tourism has undergone a sort of transformation: tourism with a long stay has been accompanied by "hit and run" tourism, with a short stop, just for the weekend or even for a few hours. The first is fed by tourists who want to spend their holidays on the lake, coming from different areas (in addition to Italians, numerous Germans, French, Swiss and Dutch), while the second is fed by those who live a short distance from the lake and who want to spend a few hours there. Both types of tourism have caused notable changes in the organization of the territory and the inhabited centres.

Furthermore, in the second half of the 20th century, a real entertainment industry was formed along Lake Garda as a series of parks were built. The most important is Gardaland, the biggest Italian theme park which hosts numerous tourist attractions.

Lake Garda is also a popular destination for sport tourism. Riva, Torbole and Campione are famous for winds that attract people who practice sail, windsurf and kiteboard. The Centomiglia Regatta also sailed there every year.

== Transport ==
=== Ferries ===
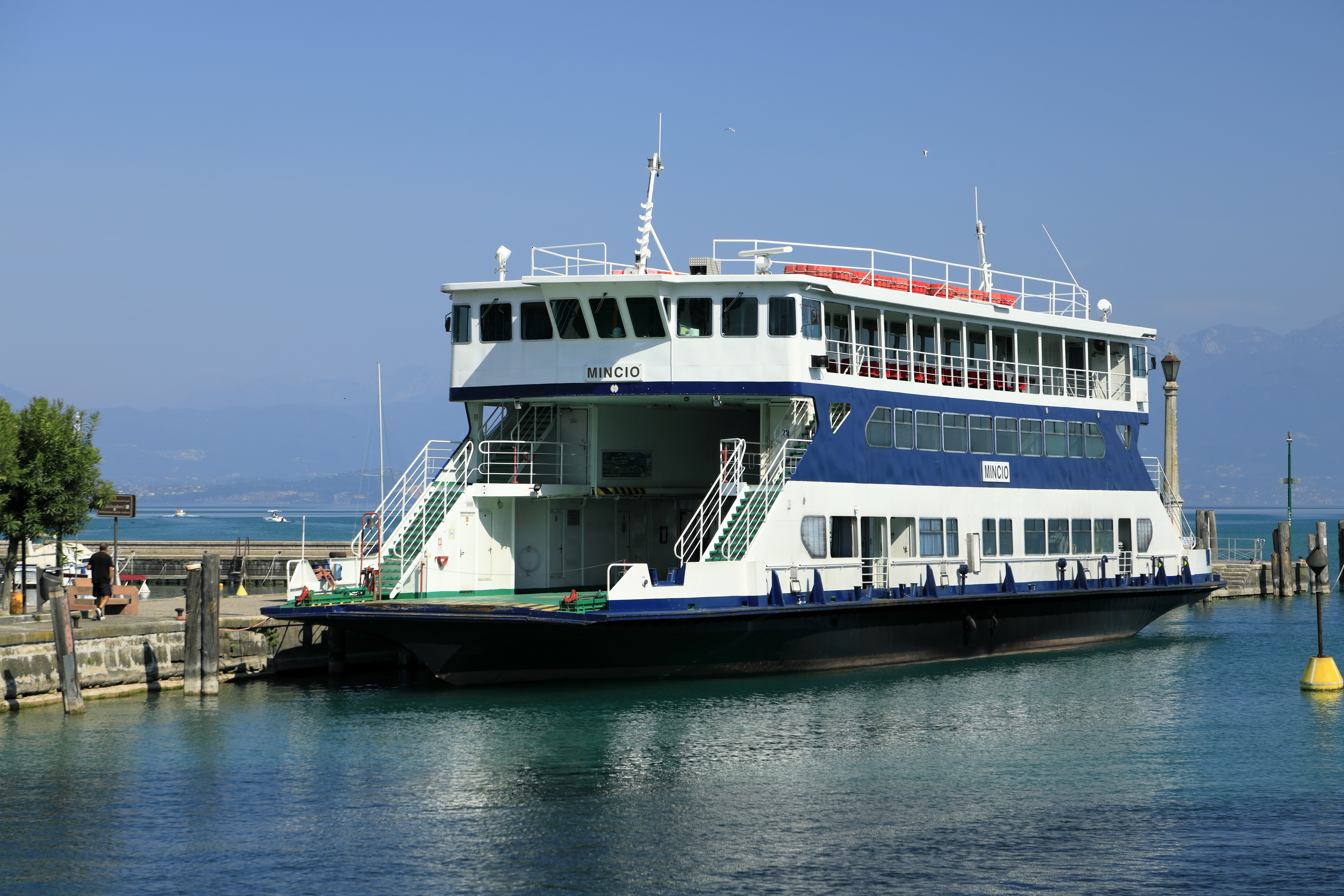
Ferry on service on the lake

Ship transport is provided by Navigazione Laghi. A daily ferry service connects major towns on the eastern and western shores of Lake Garda. The service runs from Desenzano del Garda to Riva del Garda, via Peschiera del Garda, Salò and Malcesine.

=== Railway ===
The region can be reached directly via the Milan-Venice railway, with Desenzano-Sirmione and Peschiera railway station.

=== Buses ===
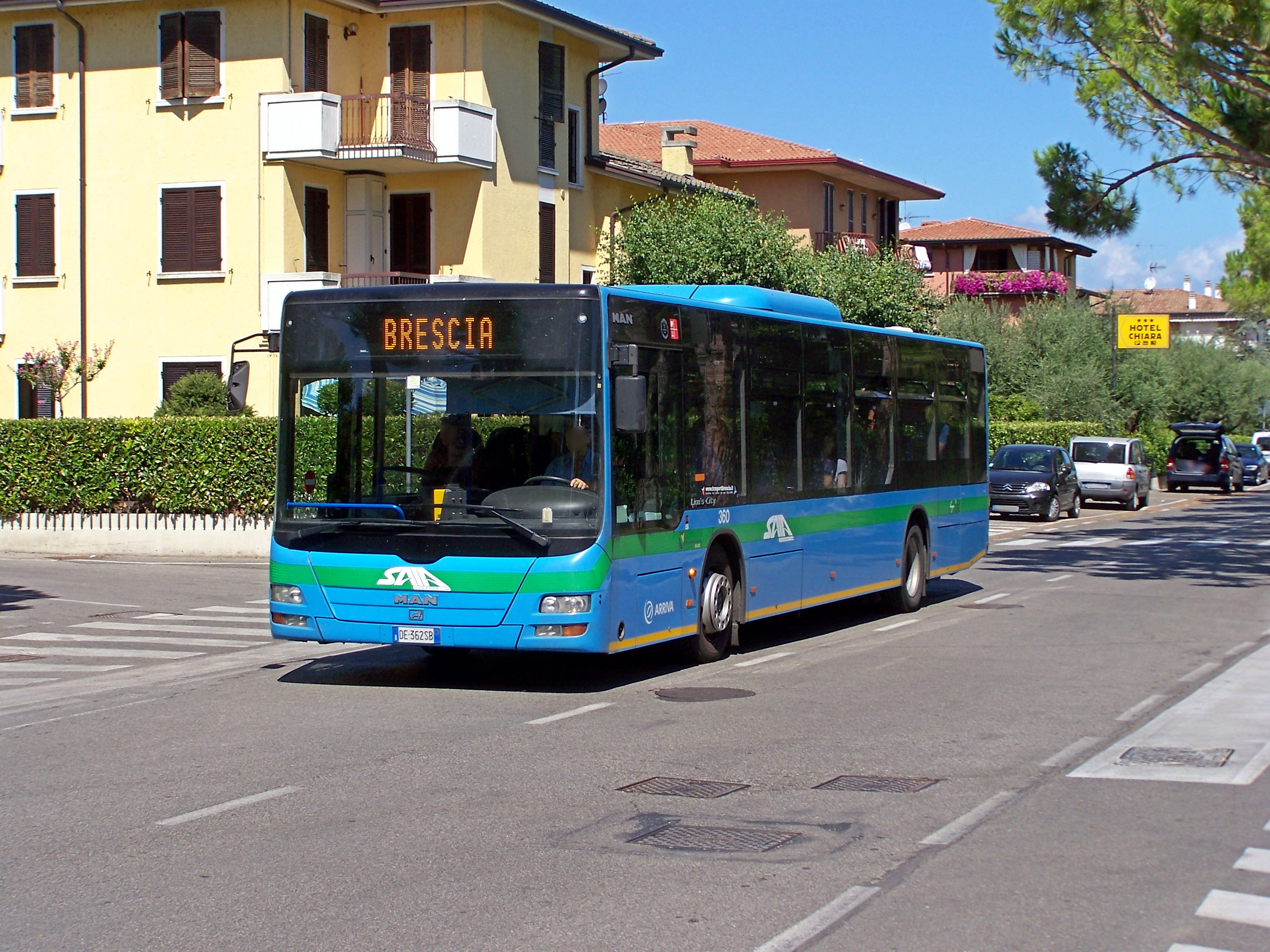
Bus directed to Brescia in Sirmione

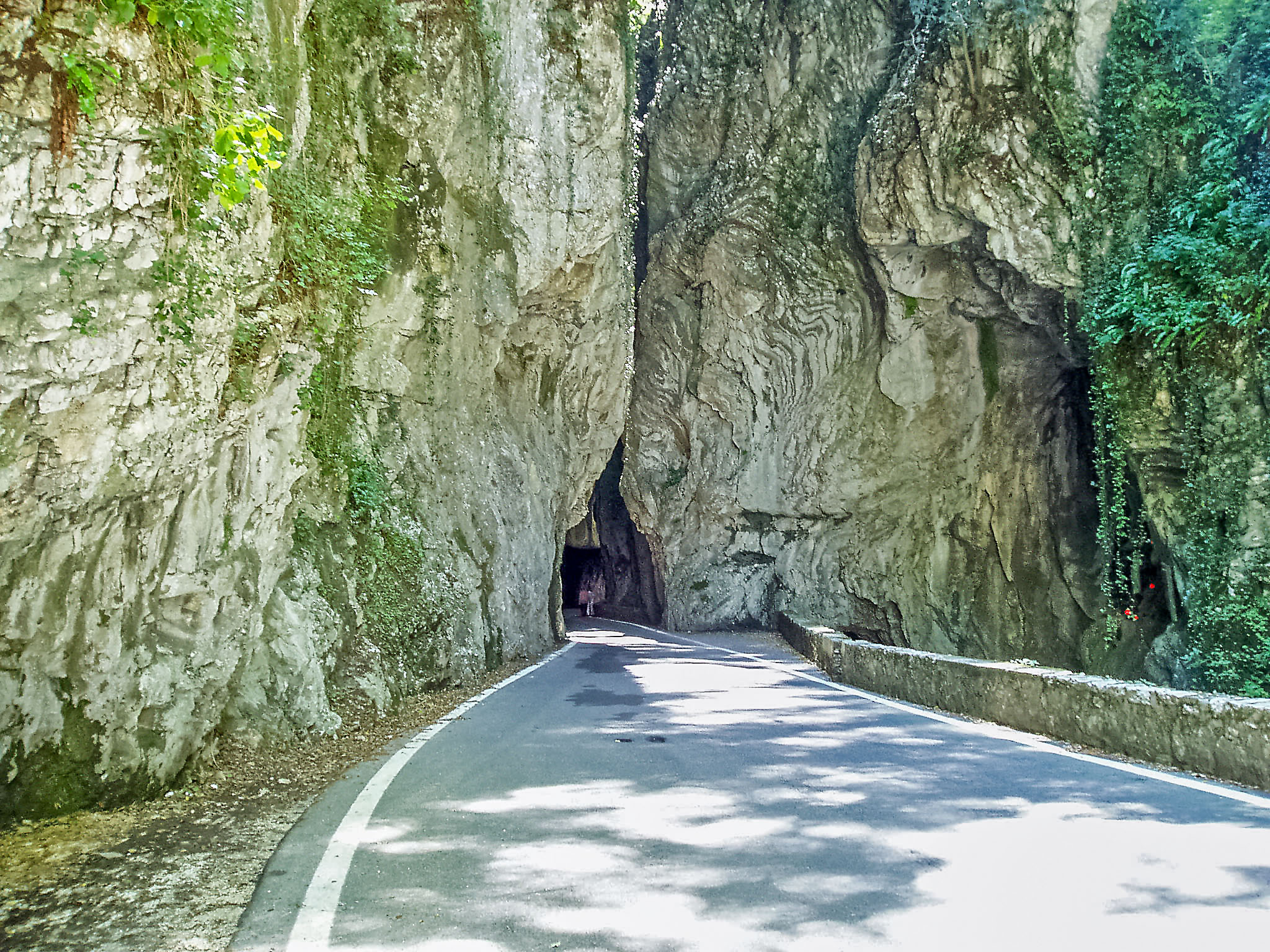

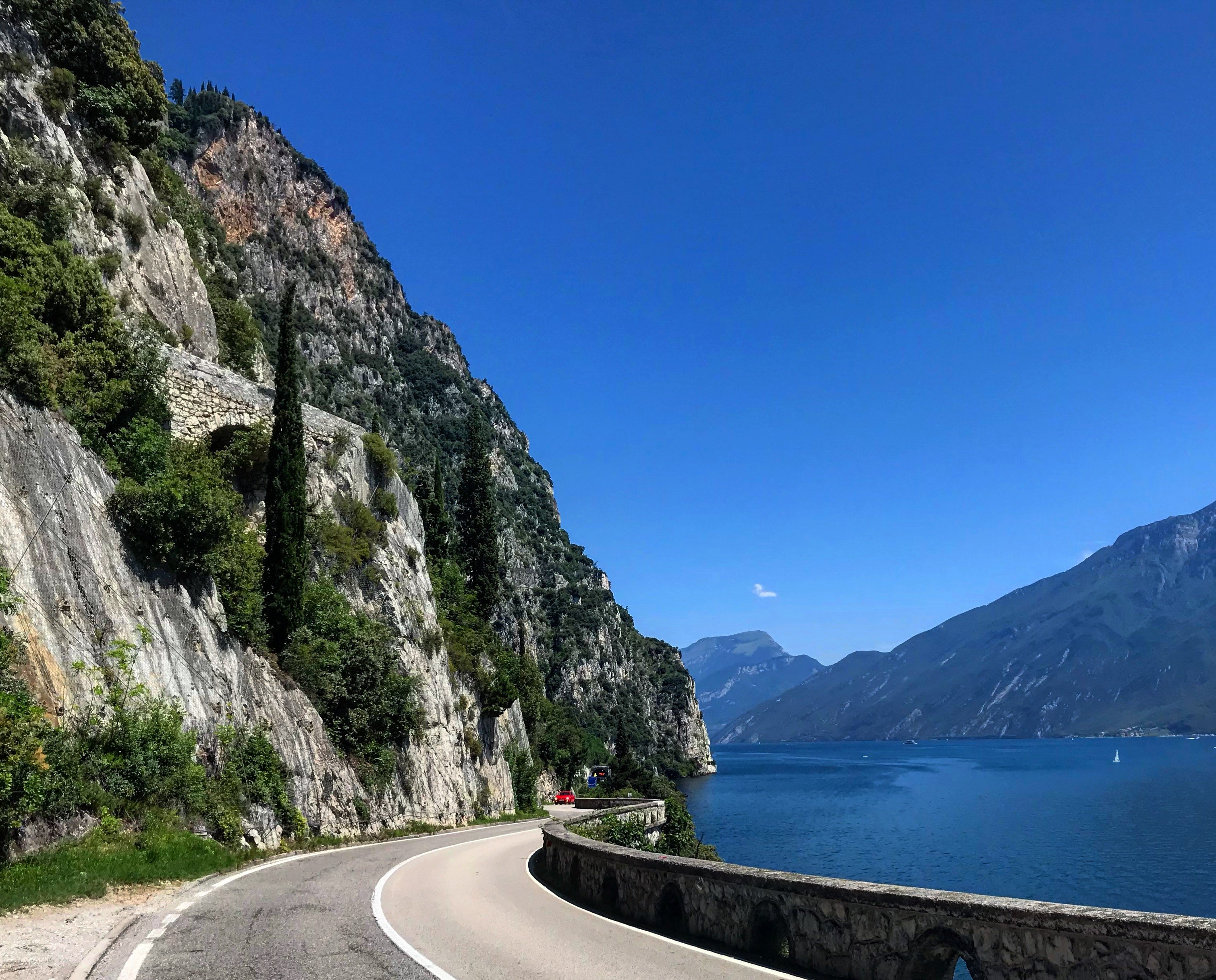
Strada della Forra in Tremosine is part of the State Highway that connects Salò to Riva del Garda. Due to its scenographic aspect in 2008, it was selected as one of the filming locations of the movie Quantum of Solace.

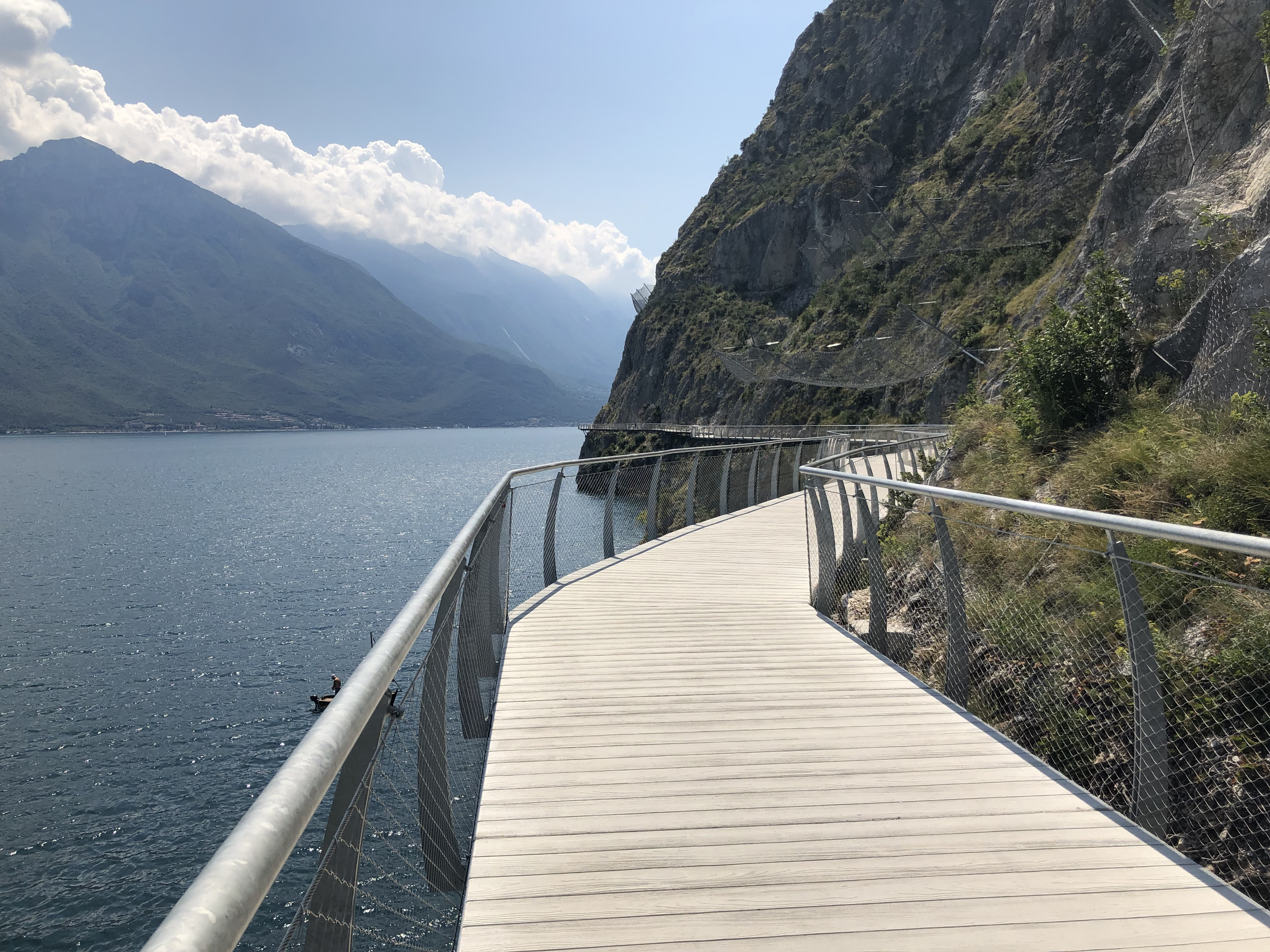
Ciclopista del Garda opened in 2018 is a shared-use path for bikes and pedestrians which runs from Limone to Riva.

Buses are faster alternatives to ferry services. On the eastern coast, ATV (Verona Transport Company) provides at least five daily bus routes between Verona and Garda, with one route extending to Riva del Garda. Trentino Transporti provides daily bus routes between Riva del Garda and Rovereto or Trento. On the western coast, SAIA (Brescia Mobilità) provides regular bus services between Desenzano del Garda, Salò, Gargnano and Brescia.

=== Highways ===
The lake is located at the centre of a crucial node between Brescia, Verona and Trento, and is therefore easily reachable via the transversal infrastructures of the Po Valley and those of the Brenner-Rome axis:

A4 TURIN – TRIESTE
| Type | Exit | ↓km↓ | ↑km↑ | Province | European Route |
| | Brescia Est; Brescia-Montichiari | 228.8 | 413.5 | BS | |
| | Parking Area "Campagnola" | 232.2 | 409.1 | BS | |
| | Desenzano | 243.9 | 397.4 | BS | |
| | Service Area "Monte Alto" | 244.6 | 396.7 | BS | |
| | Sirmione | 251.3 | 390.0 | BS | |
| | Peschiera | 258.8 | 382.5 | VR | |
| | Castelnuovo del Garda (under construction); Strada Statale 450 di Affi | 266.3 | 375.0 | VR | |
| | Parking Area "Val di Sona" | 268.4 | 372.9 | VR | |
| | Sommacampagna; Verona-Villafranca | 270.4 | 370.9 | VR | |
| | Service Area "Monte Baldo" | 271.7 | 369.6 | VR | |
| | Autostrada A22 | 275.3 | 366.0 | VR | |
A22 MODENA – BRENNERO
| | Autostrada A4 | 86 | 228 | VR | |
| | Verona nord Verona-Villafranca | 88 | 226 | VR | |
| | Service Area "Garda" | 104 | 210 | VR | |
| | Affi–Lago di Garda sud | 108 | 206 | VR | |
| | Service Area "Adige" | 128 | 186 | VR | |
| | Ala–Avio | 135 | 179 | TN | |
| | Rovereto sud–Lago di Garda nord | 147 | 167 | TN | |

=== Roads ===
Lake Garda is also served by a road network that runs along the entire lake and is made up of the following infrastructures:

- State Highway 11 Padana Superiore, from Desenzano del Garda to Peschiera del Garda
- State Highway 45bis Gardesana Occidentale, from Salò to Riva del Garda
- State Highway 249 Gardesana Orientale, from Peschiera del Garda to Riva del Garda
- State Highway 572 di Salò, from Desenzano del Garda to Salò

== Panoramas ==
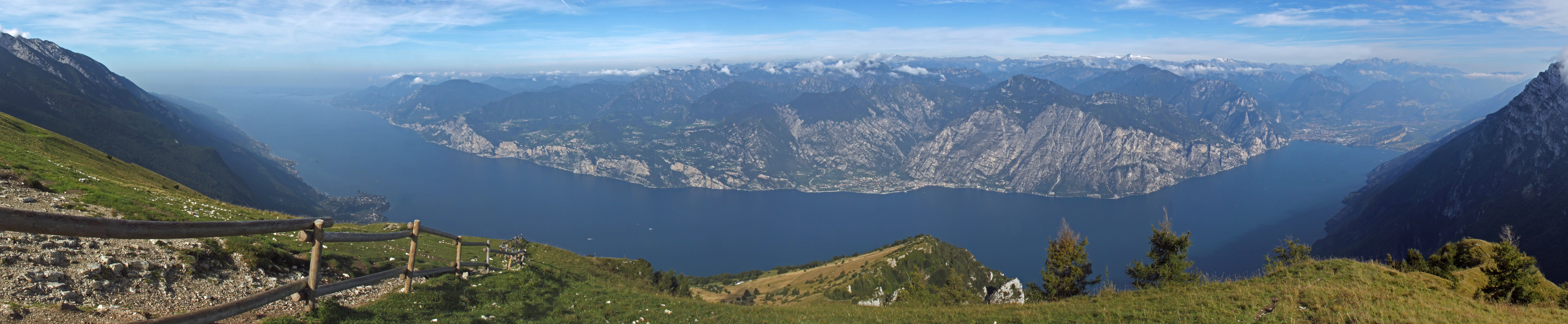
Panoramic view from Monte Baldo of Lake Garda
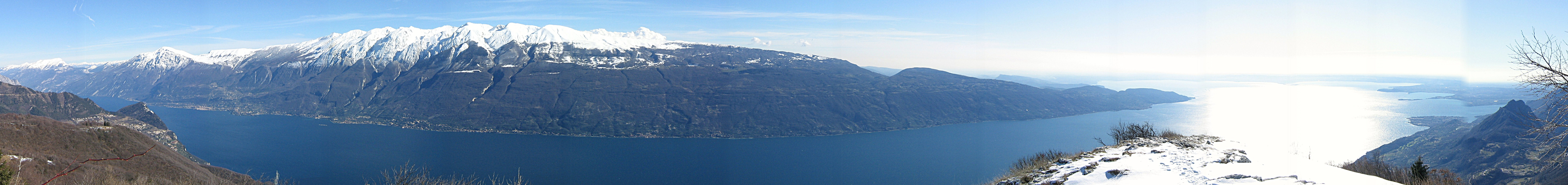
Panoramic view of Lake Garda from Cima Comer

== See also ==
- Sirmio – Promontory at Lake Garda
- Rocca di Manerba del Garda – Rocky promontory in Lombardy, Italy
- Italian Lakes
- List of lakes of Italy
- Centomiglia Regatta
