= Bocca di Navene =

Mountain pass in Italy

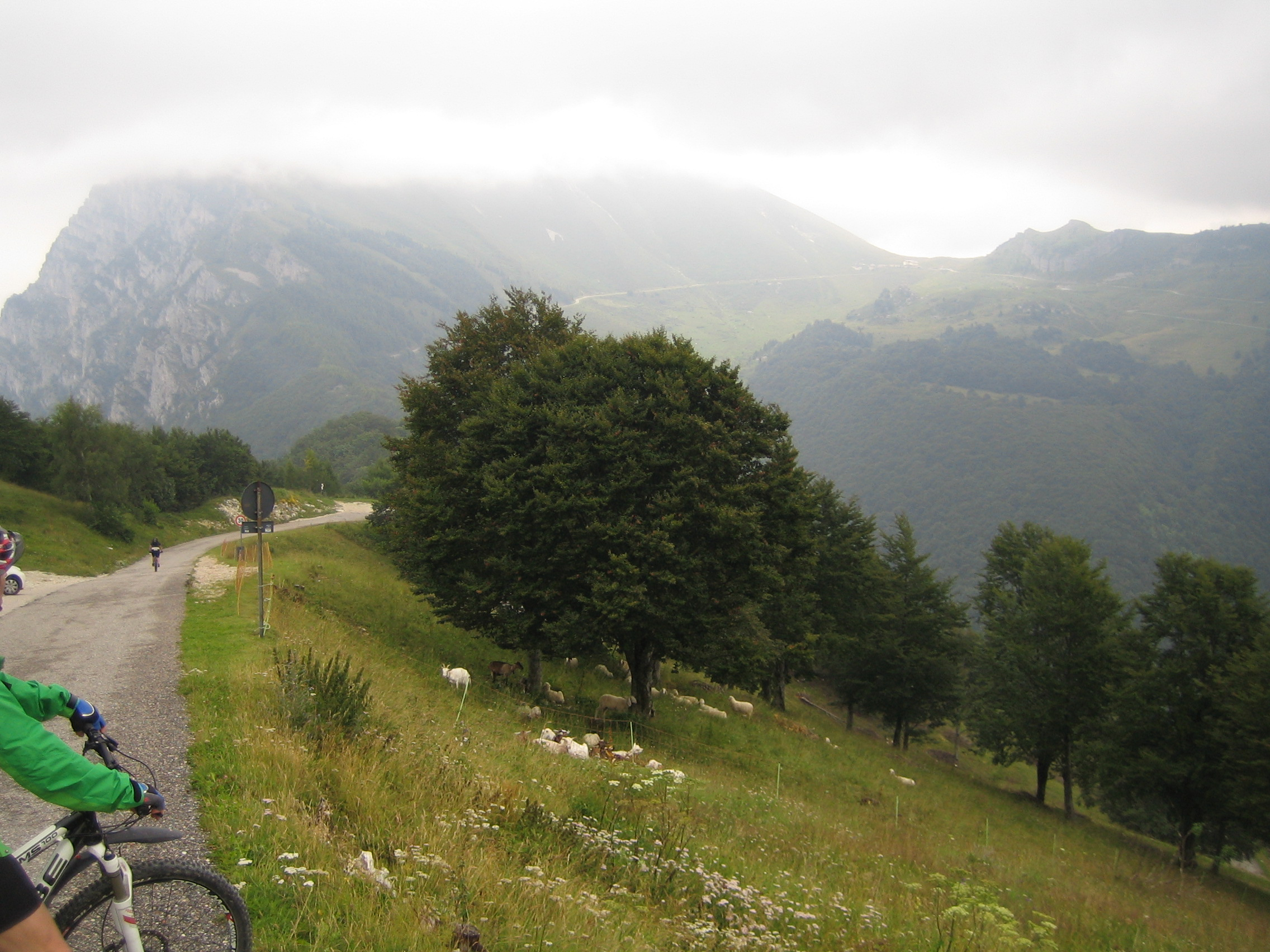
- Bocca di Navene from the south. In the background Altissimo di Nago in clouds.

- Location within Alps
- Elevation: 1,420 metres (4,660 ft)

Third Approach
- Location: Italy
- Range: Monte Baldo
- Coordinates: 45°47′17″N 10°52′22″E

Bocca di Navene is a mountain saddle in the Monte Baldo range in the Garda Mountains in northern Italy. The saddle separates the more solitary Monte Altissimo di Nago (2078 m) in the north from the rest of the range with the long ridge with Cima Valdritta (2292 m) in the south.

On the western side a steep hiking path leads down to lake Garda, while at the eastern side the slopes are more gentle and fall down to the small barrier lake Lago di Prà della Stua.

Bocca di Navene is also at the border between the Italian provinces of Trentino and Veneto.

== Tourism ==
The highway Strada Provinciale del Monte Baldo leads over the saddle and there is a mountain hut Rifugio Bocca di Navene directly at the saddle point.

== See also ==
- List of highest paved roads in Europe
- List of mountain passes
