= Riva del Garda =

- Comune
- Comune di Riva del Garda
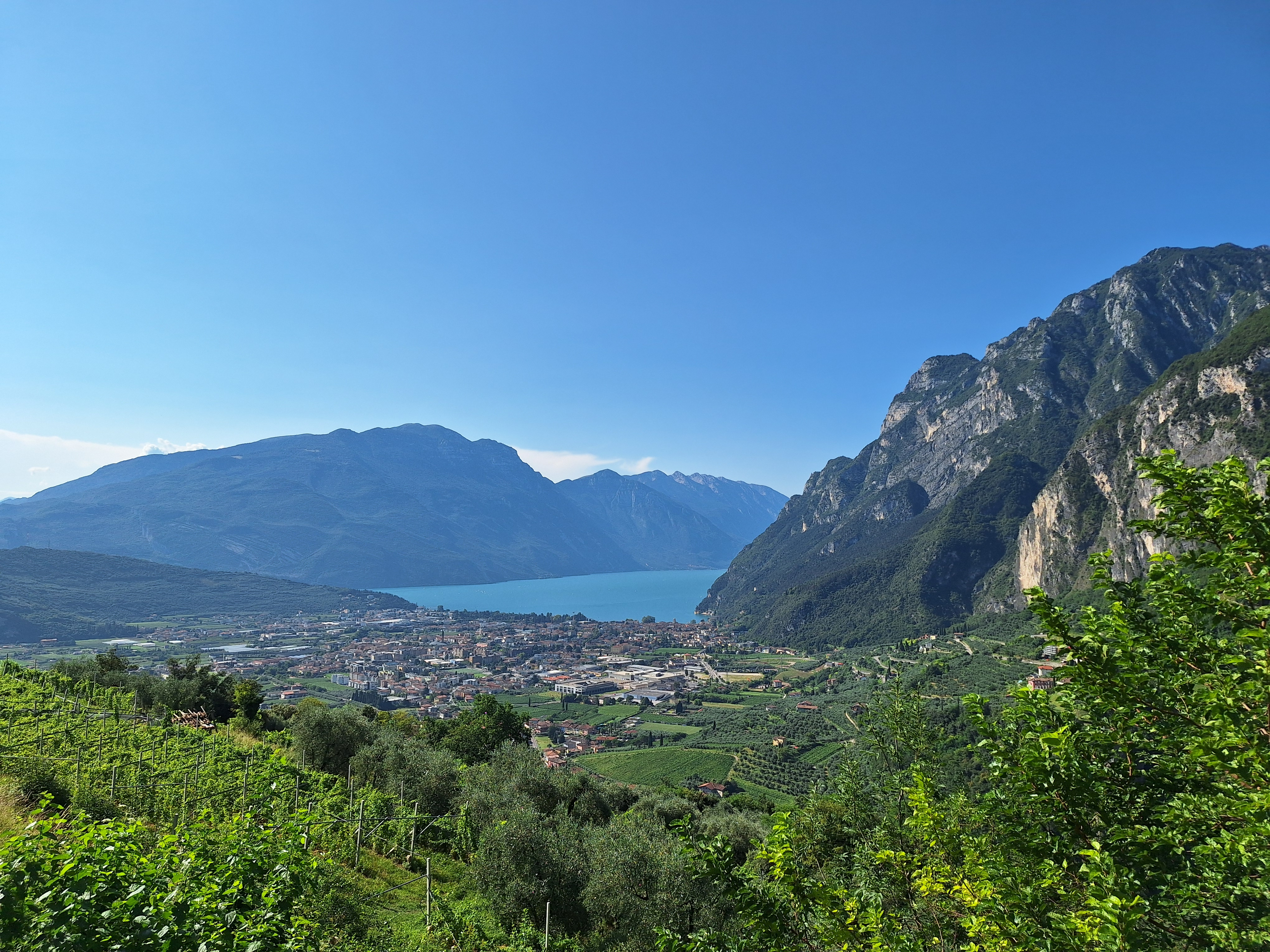
- Riva del Garda seen from the north

- Coat of arms

- Location within Trentino-Alto Adige/Südtirol Location within Italy
- Coordinates: 45°53′N 10°51′E
- Country: Italy
- Region: Trentino-Alto Adige/Südtirol
- Province: Trentino (TN)
- Frazioni: Campi, Pregasina, Rifugio Capanna Grassi, Rifugio Nino Pernici, San Nazzaro, Sant'Alessandro, Varone

Government
  - Mayor: Alessio Zanoni

Area
  - Total: 40.73 km^{2} (15.73 sq mi)
- Elevation: 70 m (230 ft)

Population (31 October 2017)
  - Total: 17,331
  - Density: 425.5/km^{2} (1,102/sq mi)
- Demonym: Rivani
- Time zone: UTC+1 (CET)
  - Summer (DST): UTC+2 (CEST)
- Postal code: 38066
- Dialing code: 0464
- Patron saint: Assumption of Mary
- Saint day: August 15
- Website: www.comune.rivadelgarda.tn.it

Riva del Garda (Rìva in local dialect) is a town and comune in the northern Italian province of Trento of the Trentino Alto Adige region. It is also known simply as Riva and is located at the northern tip of Lake Garda.

== History ==
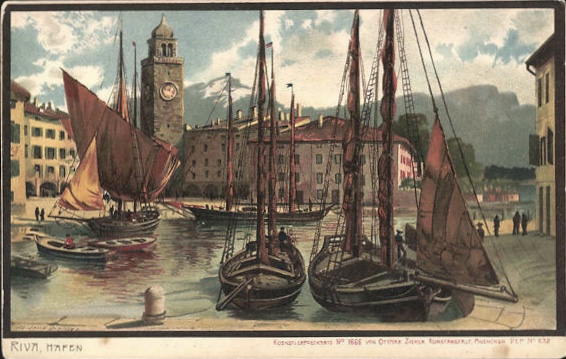
The harbour by Michael Zeno Diemer (c. 1902)

Riva del Garda belonged to the Republic of Venice, the Bishopric of Trent, the Napoleonic Kingdom of Italy and later (1815–1918) to the Austro-Hungarian Empire (when it was known as Reiff am Gartsee). During the Third Italian War of Independence, Riva del Garda was an important supply base for the Austrian navy and was the only town on the lake captured by Italian forces. In 1918, after the end of World War I, Riva del Garda, with the rest of the Trentino, became part of the Kingdom of Italy.

Riva was the terminus for the 24 kilometres (15 miles) long Mori–Arco–Riva railway line, opened in 1891. However, the railway line closed in 1936 and the railway terminus has been converted into a restaurant.

Austrian statesman Kurt Schuschnigg was born in the town in 1897 and was of Carinthian Slovene descent.

== Geography ==
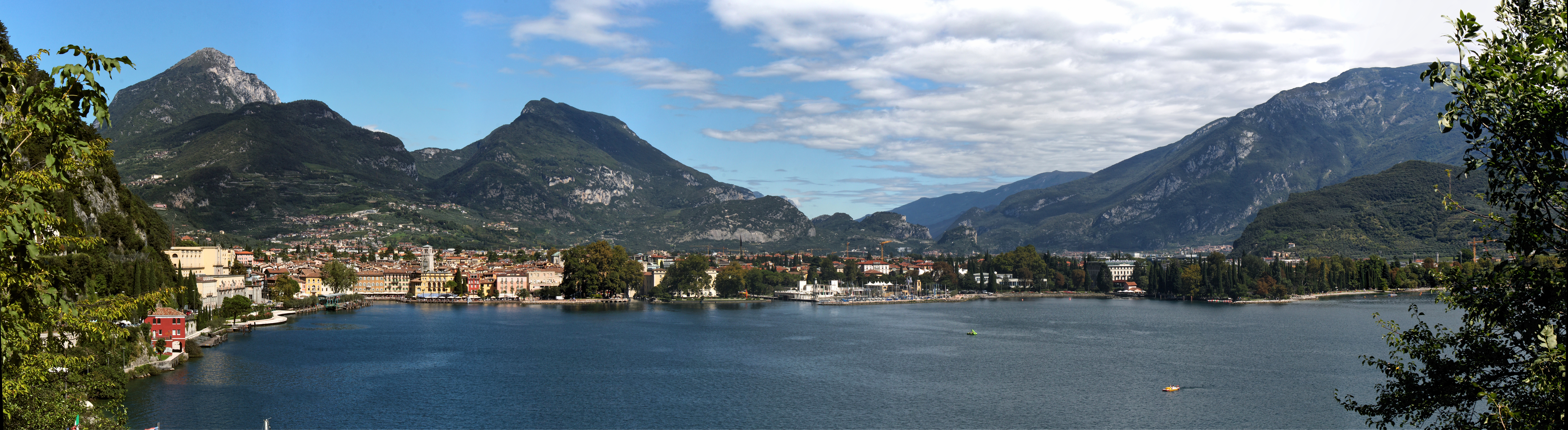
A panoramic image of the Riva del Garda's lakefront

Riva del Garda is located at the north-western corner of Lake Garda, approximately 70 metres (230 feet) above sea level. The town is located at the southern edge of the Italian Alps near the Dolomites. It is bordered by Monte Rocchetta to the west and Monte Brione, 376 metres (1,234 ft) above sea level, to the east. East of Riva del Garda is the village Torbole, bordered by Monte Baldo.

=== Climate ===
Winters are chilly and relatively sunny; snow isn't rare, although since the late 1980s Riva has seen a noticeable decrease of snowfalls and yearly amounts (like the rest of northern Italy) due to the warming trends of the winter in the past 30 years. Summers are warm but rarely hot and/or muggy, mainly thanks to the local and mild lake breeze in the afternoon hours and some scattered thunderstorms in the late afternoon.

January averages are −1 to 6 °C (30 to 43 °F), while July are 17 to 28 °C (63 to 82 °F).

The average of the yearly precipitations is 1,064 mm (41.9 in) (1871–2020), while the yearly snow averages 27 cm (11 in) (1925–2020), with a record of 124 cm (49 in) in the winter 1984–1985; the highest snowcover on the ground has been about 75 cm (30 in) by the Christmas of 1938 and, later, 60–65 cm (24–26 in) during a significant snowfall between January 13 and 17, 1985.

== Economy ==
Tourism is one of the most important activities of the town. The town is also home to industries such as paper manufacturing.

== Main sights ==
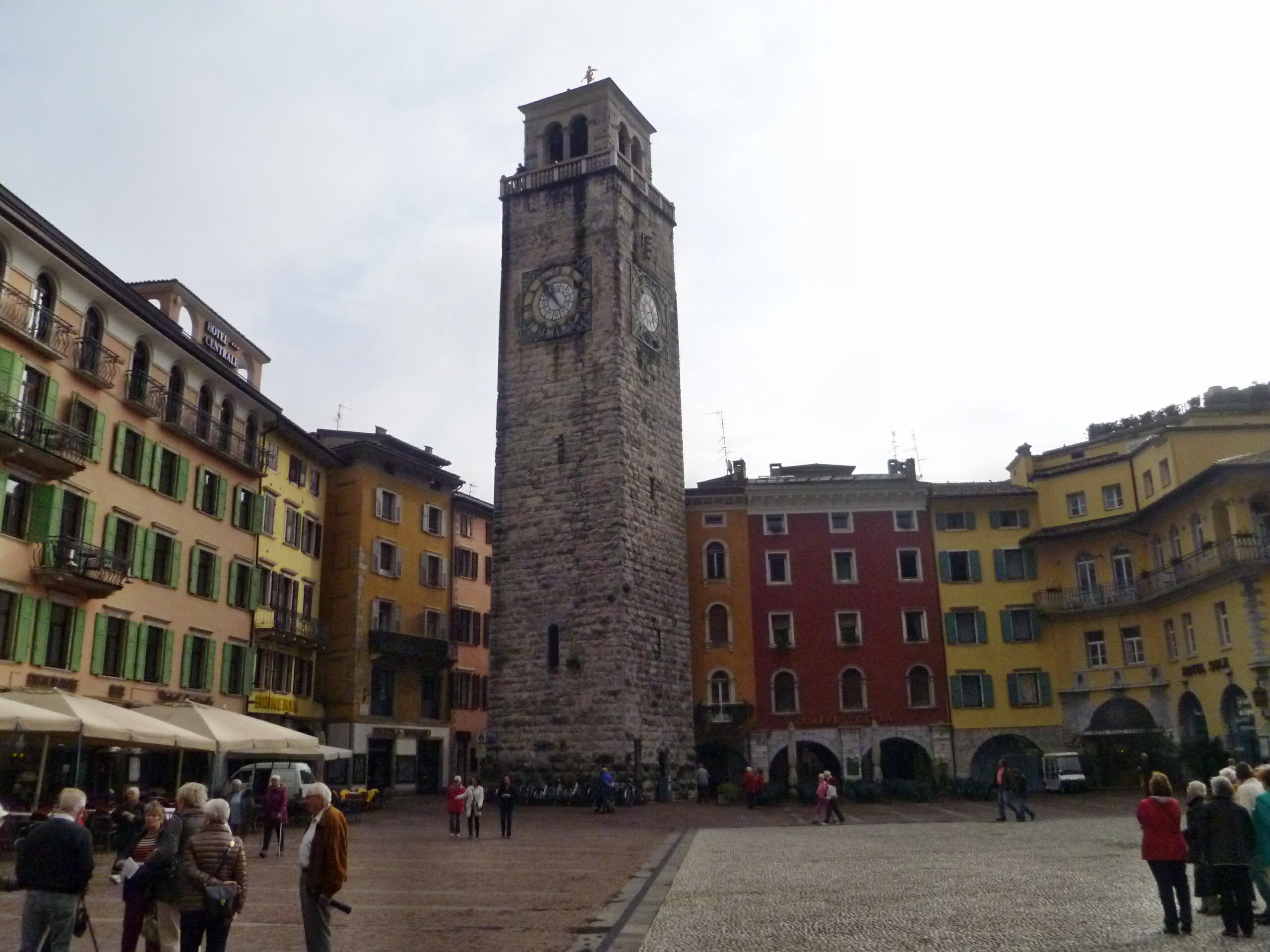
Torre Apponale tower and city

The Museo Civico is located in the Rocca, a medieval fortress with quadrangular bastions, placed on the lake, bounded by a canal with drawbridge. It was the fortress of the noble family Scaligeri (1124), who became the Lords of Verona. It was rebuilt several times and it was used by the Austrians as barracks in the 18th century. It is frequently the seat of cultural activities, especially during the summer months. The medieval Torre Apponale is a medieval tower first mentioned in 1273, but probably older. It belonged to the first fortress of Riva, that no longer exists. Modifications were made in 1555 and it was raised to 34 metres (112 ft). The Piazza III Novembre is situated between the tower and the harbour. The city hall comprises the Palazzo Pretorio from 1375 (the former cantonal courthouse) and the Palazzo del Provveditore (the governor's palace), built between 1472 and 1485.

The city gates Porta San Marco (11th century), built by the Venetians, and Porta San Michele (13th century), at the Piazza Cavour, are remnants of the medieval city walls. The Porta San Michele has a small battlemented belfry for the parochial church of Maria Assunta. This church was originally a romanesque-gothic building from the 14th century (attested by a medieval relief at its southern side), but was rebuilt in baroque style in 1728. It has a single nave and nine baroque altars. The altarpieces were made by local artists, such as Ignazio Martino Oliari da Riva, Giuseppe Craffonara da Riva and Giovanni Caliari da Verona. The fresco in the dome is by the 17th century Baroque painter Giuseppe Alberti.

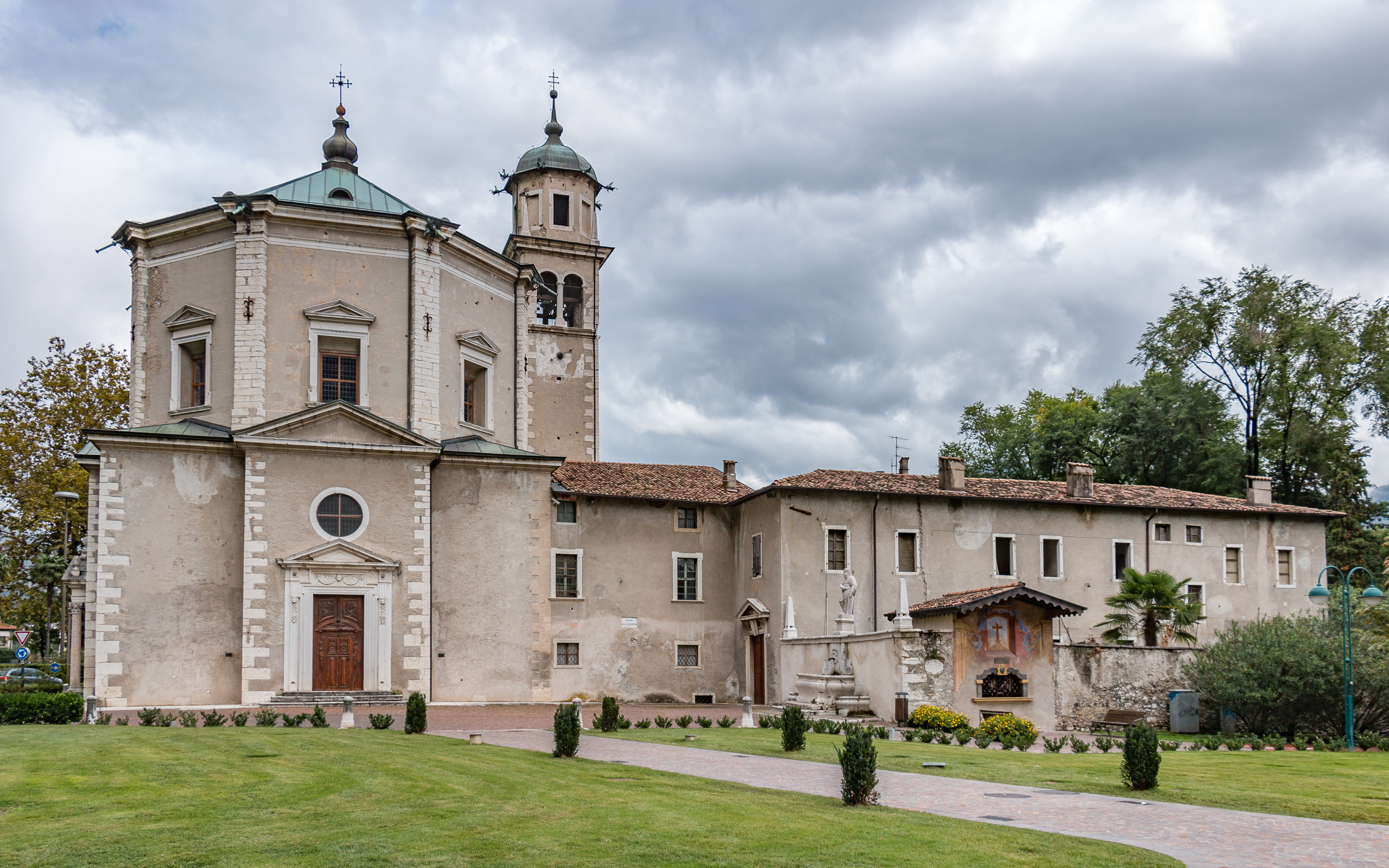
Church of Inviolata

The Chiesa dell'Inviolata, dominating Largo Marconi, is considered among the most beautiful baroque churches in Trentino. It is an octagonal building with the belfry next to it. It contains the altarpieces "San Carlo Borromeo" and "San Gerolamo" by the Mannerist painter Palma il Giovane. In the middle of the octagonal dome is a Baroque fresco "The coronation of Maria in Heaven".

Places of geological interest in the vicinity include Tenno Lake, Lago di Ledro (with its paleoethnographic museum), and the Varone falls.

== Sport ==
With its two harbours, Riva del Garda is popular for sailing and windsurfing. Rock climbing and mountain biking are also common activities. Basketball is a sport enjoyed in the town; there are two teams in the regional league, Virtus Riva and GS Riva. In the winter months, skiing is available, with a couple of ski-resorts located just 20-30 driving minutes from the town and others about 45–60 minutes away.

Via ferrata for rock climbing Via dell'Amicizia, which is 650 metres (2,130 ft) high, ends at the height of 1,200 metres (3,900 ft) meters (route starts approximately at the middle of the mountain at about 600 metres (2,000 ft) meters above the town) and lasts about 2:40 hrs. on average.

== Sister cities ==
- Bensheim, Germany

== Sources ==
- Helders, Stefan (2010), "Riva", Profile of geographical entity including name variants, Germany: World Gazetteer
