= Monte Altissimo di Nago =

Mountain in Italy

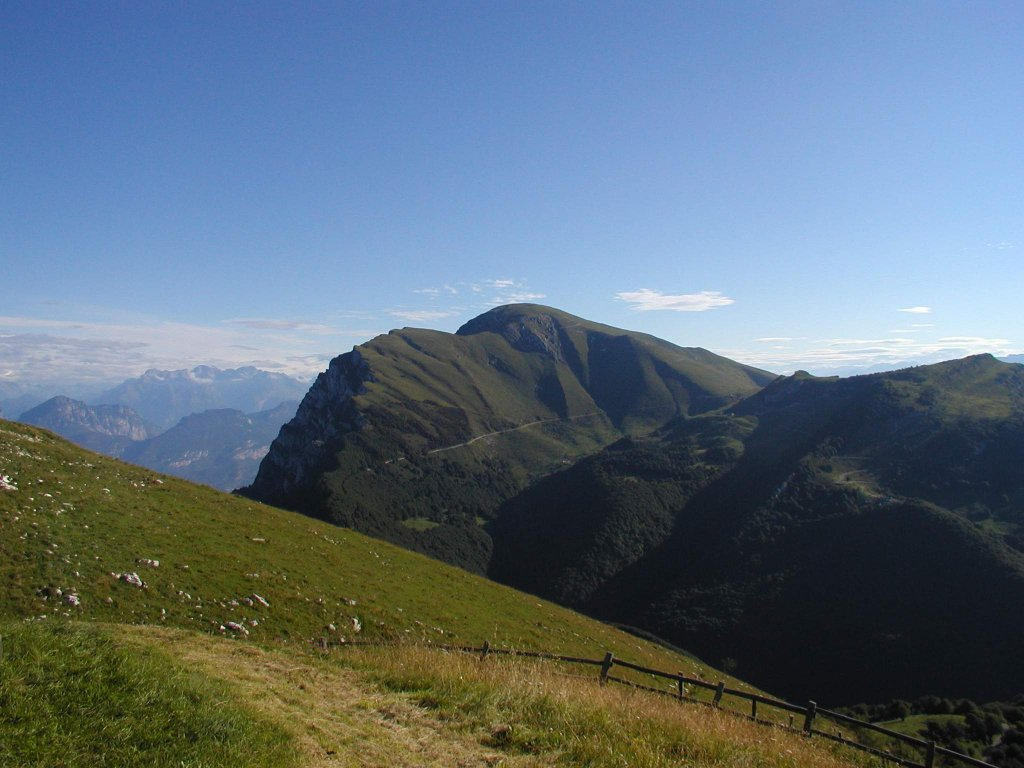
- View from the south

Highest point
- Elevation: 2,078 m (6,818 ft)
- Coordinates: 45°48′38″N 10°53′17″E

Geography
- Location within Italy
- Location: Trentino, northern Italy
- Parent range: Alps, Brescia and Garda Prealps

Climbing
- Easiest route: mountain hike

Monte Altissimo di Nago is one of the highest summits of the Monte Baldo mountain range and thereby part of the Garda Mountains in northern Italy.

== Morphology ==
The Altissimo is the highest peak in the northern part of the Monte-Baldo range, which stretches roughly from north to south. Other important peaks in the range are Punta Telegrafo to the south and the highest peak of the range Cima Valdritta. The saddle Bocca di Navene separates the southern part from the northern part.

== Alpinism ==
On top of the Altissimo there is a mountain hut, the Rifugio Damiano Chiesa. The easiest way to reach the top is a hike over a dirt road from Strada Provinciale del Monte Baldo, also a prominent mountain-biking route. The important alpine long-distance hiking Peace Trail (Sentiero della Pace) also leads over the top of the Altissimo.

== History ==
Besides the mountain hut, there are also leftover military installations from World War I and a chapel for remembrance to the wars victims.
