= Fort Nago =

Austro-Hungarian fortification in Trentino, Italy

Coordinates: 45°52′26″N 10°53′10″E

Fort Nago (Italian: Forte Nago, German: Strassensperre Nago) is an Austro-Hungarian fortification built in Northern Italy. Between 1860–62, Nago was built to guard the local pass. At the time of its construction, Nago was considered the best design for a road block, using a smaller, lower structure at the roadside which was supported by a larger structure up the hill. The higher structure could watch the road from farther up, but the lower structure at the roadside was blind to anything not almost on top of it. The lower structure could physically cut off the road using a large iron door. Both structures were built out of chiseled limestone.

== Armament ==
- 6 M63 10 cm guns in the upper fortification
- 4 M73 12 cm guns (Upper)
- 1 M61 15cm gun (Upper)
- 2 10cm guns in the lower fortification

From 1881 till 1900, Nago was supported by the "Sagron" Battery on Monte Baldo, just to the south. Nago's garrison was 5 officers and 148 enlisted men. At the start of hostilities with Italy in May 1915, Nago's guns were removed and placed in a cave battery nearby.

== Post-war to today ==
In 1969, work was started to restore the upper fort and slightly modified the structure. In the late 1990s, the municipality of Nago–Torbole, with support from the Superintendency for Architectural Heritage, began restoring Nago. In 2000, restoration wrapped up and the upper floor of the upper fortification now houses a restaurant, while the bottom floor is an exhibition space. The lower fortification at the road level is for catering now.
