= Cascate del Varone =

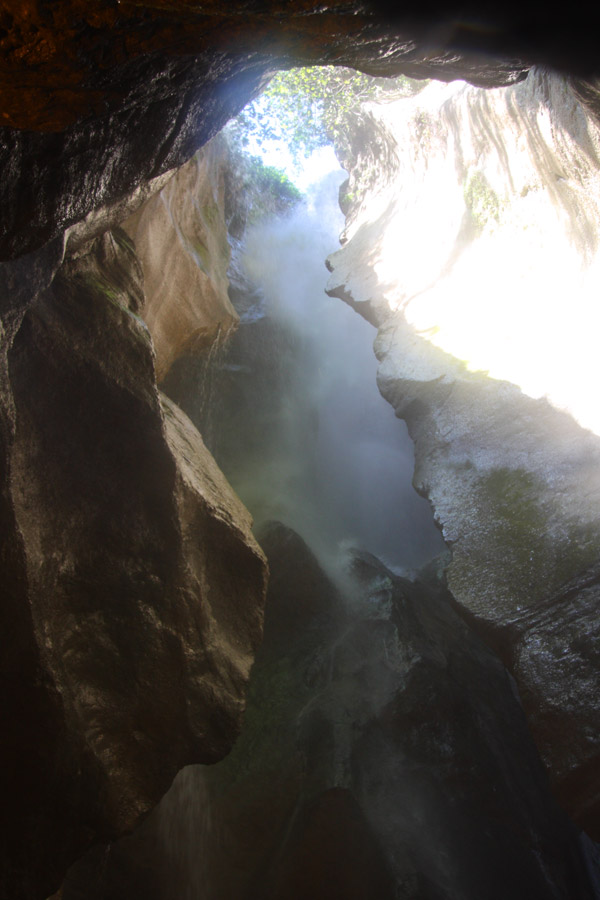
- The cave of the waterfall

- Location within Italy
- Location: Riva del Garda Italy
- Coordinates: 45°54′41″N 10°50′04″E
- Type: Cascade
- Total height: 100 m (330 ft)

The Cascate del Varone (Varone Waterfalls) are pair of waterfalls that fall into a vertical cave 3 kilometers north-west of the northern end of Lake Garda and the city of Riva del Garda in northern Italy. The name Varone has its origin from the town of Varone a short distance away.

== The formation of the falls ==
During the Quaternary period the great Garda glacier retreated. Its slow course scooped and flattened the area now known as the Lower Cerca Valley and Lake Garda. After the glacier retreated completely, the rivers could flow towards Lake Garda without interruption, continuing with greater force the work of erosion that the glacier had begun. The water flowed to the place where the entrance to the cave stands today, before the channel was created. For a period of about 20,000 years and more, the water steadily eroded, along with the load of sand, pebbles and gravel, the bedrock (hard limestone from the Jurassic period).

While the erosion was slow at first, once the first fissure was carved, the quarrying effect became increasingly efficient and rapid, as it tended to concentrate on this line of weakness of the crack in the rock. On such hard rock, the erosion took the form of deep, narrow cuts. The erosion work continues even today and the water wears away the rock at a rate of two millimeters per year. The fall track therefore gradually moves back upstream towards the mountain as part of the headward erosion. As a result, the eddies also move deeper into the channel. Varone Cave is an example of a backwash waterfall. This means that the phenomenon of drifting on the surface of the rock behind the waterfall causes the waterfall to constantly retreat.

Over the thousands of years, large, unstable slabs of rock, stones and piles of detritus were sometimes detached and washed forward, causing and still causing the current design of the channel. Today the river penetrates into the cave in the mountain and the waterfall drops a total of 98 meters down the channel.

== Geography ==
The falls are fed by the waters of the Magnone River, which originates in the nearby Lake Tenno, which is north-northwest of the falls. The lake is at an altitude of 550 meters above sea level, while Lake Garda into which the river flows is located at an altitude of only 70 meters. The waterfalls are at an intermediate height of about 200 meters above sea level, that is, over 350 meters below Lake Tenno. The waters of the lake leak into its rocky infrastructure – a typical phenomenon in a Karst environment for natural water reservoirs that lack drainage on the surface. This water rises to the surface several kilometers south of the lake, forming the Magnone River which falls into the Varona Cave and forms the Varone Falls on their way to Lake Garda.

== The tourism site ==
The falls were not accessible to the general public until the inauguration of a regulated tourist site on the spot. There were only steep cliffs in the place and the waterfall was only accessible to climbers up the waterfall itself, or to those who dangled using ropes, an action that only experienced mountaineers felt safe enough to do. In the middle of the 19th century, the development of the place began with the aim of making them accessible to the public. The tourist site at Varona Falls was inaugurated with great pomp on June 20, 1874. The guest of honor at the ceremony was Prince Nikola of Montenegro, who happened to be by the lake at that time. Since then, the falls have been an attraction for every visitor to the northern area of Lake Garda, and have been the destination of many celebrities: Names of artists and writers appearing in the visitors books include Prince Umberto II of Savoy, Gabriele D'Annunzio, the Emperor Franz Joseph I of Habsburg, Franz Kafka, Thomas Mann and many others. Thomas Mann often visited Riva del Garda between 1901 and 1904, apparently drawing inspiration for some sections of his novel The Magic Mountain from the falls, for example the phrase "The water pours down with a deafening noise at the back of the deep, narrow chasm formed by paunchy, bare, slippery rocks that resemble huge fish bellies." Today the place is highly developed, with a botanical garden on the way to it, and a convenient tourist road, which allows access to an upper observation on the upper waterfall, and a lower observation on the lower waterfall.

== See also ==
- List of waterfalls
