= Staia gens =

Ancient Roman family

The gens Staia was an obscure plebeian family at ancient Rome. Few members of this gens are mentioned by ancient writers, but a number are known from inscriptions. The most illustrious of the Staii was Lucius Staius Murcus, governor of Syria in 44 BC, and a military commander of some ability who served under several leading figures of the period.

== Origin ==
The nomen Staius is of Oscan origin, and belongs to a large class of gentilicia formed using the suffix -aius. The first of the Staii appearing in history was a Samnite, as were many of the other Staii known from inscriptions. The nomen is frequently confused with that of Statius.

== Praenomina ==
The earliest Staii bore Oscan praenomina, such as Minatus and Ovius, but in subsequent generations they bore praenomina more typical at Rome, including Numerius and Tiberius. In imperial times, the chief names used by the Staii were Lucius, Marcus, and Gaius, the most common praenomina at all periods of Roman history. They occasionally used other common names, such as Publius, Gnaeus, and Sextus.

== Members ==
This list includes abbreviated praenomina. For an explanation of this practice, see filiation.

- Minatus Staius, (Note: His correct nomenclature is not certain; in different editions of Livy, his name is given alternately as Staius or Statius Minatius or Minacius. Both Statius and Minatus are Oscan praenomina; Statius is also a gentile name, as is Staius. Pauly-Wissowa regards Minatus Staius as the most likely possibility, in part because a later inscription mentions a person with precisely this name.) a Samnite general during the Third Samnite War, who was captured and sent to Rome in 296 BC.
- Minatus Staius Ov. f., named in an inscription from Delos in Achaia, dating to the third quarter of the second century BC.
- Tiberius Staius Min. l., a freedman mentioned in an inscription from Delos, dating from 125 BC.
- Staia Ov. f., named in a sepulchral inscription from Cumae in Campania, dating from the first half of the first century BC.
- Lucius Staius Sex. f. Murcus, (Note: Frequently given as "Statius".) one of Caesar's legates during the Civil War. He served in the African War, and was probably Praetor in 45. The following year, he was sent as proconsul to Syria, where he and Quintus Marcius Crispus defeated the Pompeian Quintus Caecilius Bassus. He later served under Gaius Cassius Longinus and Sextus Pompeius, who betrayed and murdered him about 39.
- Staius Esdragassi f. Vobenatis, a prefect in the Trumplinian cohort serving under the tribune Gaius Vibius Pansa in 43 BC, was buried at Trumplini in Venetia and Histria, with a monument from his wife, Messava.
- Lucius Staius L. f., buried at Saepinum in Samnium, along with his wife, Herennia, and daughter, Staia, in a tomb dating to the latter half of the first century BC.
- Staia M. f., the mother of Gaius Paccius Balbus, who had been praetor and proconsul, according to an inscription dating from the reign of Augustus.
- Numerius Staius N. f., the patron of Numerius Staius Cosmus, a freedman who built a family sepulchre at Casilinum in Campania for his patron, the freedwoman Staia Dynamis, and his daughter, Staia Cosmilla, dating to the first century BC, or first century AD.
- Numerius Staius N. l. Cosmus, a freedman who dedicated a family sepulchre at Casilinum for himself, his patron, Numerius Staius, daughter, Staia Cosmilla, and the freedwoman Staia Dynamis.
- Staia N. l. Dynamis, a freedwoman buried at Casilinum, in a family sepulchre built by Numerius Staius Cosmus for himself, his daughter, Staia Cosmilla, Staia Dynamis, and his patron, Numerius Staius.
- Staia N. l. Cosmilla, a freedwoman buried at Casilinum, in a family sepulchre built by her father, Numerius Staius Cosmus, for his daughter, the freedwoman Staia Dynamis, and his patron, Numerius Staius.
- Marcus Staius M. f. Rufus, one of the municipal duumviri jure dicundo at Pompeii in Campania, circa AD 3.
- Staius, tribune of a cohort in the Praetorian Guard in AD 24, was dispatched to the neighbourhood of Brundisium, where he took custody of Titus Curtisius, a discontented ex-soldier who had sought to instigate a slave revolt, and delivered him to Rome.
- Staia Ampliata, named in a bronze inscription from Matrice, dating from the first half of the first century.
- Staia P. l. Felicula, a freedwoman named in an inscription from Rome, dating to the first half of the first century.
- Staia L. l. Quarta, a freedwoman buried at Venafrum in Samnium, along with Gaius Laelius, in a tomb dating to the first half of the first century.
- Marcus Staius Tyrannus, named in a sepulchral inscription from Rome, dating to the first half of the first century.
- Marcus Staius Flaccus, one of the municipal duumvirs at Nola in Campania in AD 31.
- Staia Secundilla, dedicated a tomb at Abellinum in Campania, dating to the early or middle part of the first century, for herself, her daughter, Annia Tertulla, and Avillius Anthus.
- Gaius Staius C. l. Felix, a freedman at Rome, who together with the freedwoman Pomponia Prima, made an offering to the gods of the underworld, dating between AD 14 and 50.
- Staia, mentioned in a first-century dedicatory inscription from Luceria in Apulia.
- Staia L. l., a freedwoman buried in a first-century tomb at Casinum, together with the freedmen Petillius Herma and Lucius Petillius Hilarus.
- Lucius Staius L. l. Apollonius, a freedman buried in a first-century tomb at Venafrum.
- Staia Apricula, buried in a first-century tomb at Venafrum, aged twenty-four.
- Marcus Staius M. Ɔ. l. Lygdamus Apollinaris, a freedman who donated fifteen thousand sestertii to the Seviri Augustales at Luceria during the first century.
- Numerius Staius N. l. Remissus, a freedman named in a first-century inscription from Aeclanum in Samnium.
- Titus Staius M. f. Titinius, buried in a first-century tomb at Bovianum Vetus in Samnium, dedicated by his son, Staius Titinius.
- Staius T. f. M. n. Titinius, dedicated a first century tomb at Bovianum Vetus for his father, Titus Staius Titinius.
- Lucius Staius Proculus, named in an inscription from Pompeii in Campania.
- Marcus Staius Pietas, a priest of Ceres, named in an inscription from Teanum Sidicinum, dating between AD 20 and 70.
- Staia M. f., the daughter of Marcus Staius Pietas, the priest of Ceres, named in an inscription from Teanum Sidicinum, dating between AD 20 and 70.
- Staia L. l. Quinta, a freedwoman named in an inscription from the sanctuary of Diana at Aricia in Latium, dating to the middle part of the first century.
- Staia Ɔ. l. Salvia, a freedwoman named in a sepulchral inscription from Casilinum, dating to the middle or latter part of the first century, along with the freedmen Gaius Epillius Alexander, a materiarius (woodsman or woodworker), and Gaius Epillius Felix.
- Staia Daphne, buried at Rome in a second- or early third-century tomb dedicated by her husband, whose name has not been preserved.
- Gaius Staius C. l. Hilarus, buried at Bovianum Undecimanorum in Samnium, in a first- or second-century tomb dedicated by his mother, whose name has not been preserved.
- Marcus Staius Felix, dedicated a tomb at Teanum Sidicinum in Campania, dating between AD 70 and 200, for his freedwoman, whose name has not been preserved.
- Sextus Staius Modestus, dedicated a second-century tomb at Tegianum in Lucania for his daughter, Staia Casta, and his wife, Antonia Apollonia.
- Staia Sex. f. Casta, the daughter of Sextus Staius Modestus and Antonia Apollonia, was buried at Tegianum, aged twenty-two, in a second-century sepulchre dedicated by her parents. Her mother is also buried there.
- Staius Fructio, dedicated a second-century monument at Bovianum Undecimanorum for his wife, whose name has not been preserved.
- Staia Justa, dedicated a second-century tomb at Cales in Campania for her husband of eleven years, Marcus Ennius Cerealis, one of the Seviri Augustales of that city, aged thirty-one years, five months.
- Marcus Staius Cosmus, buried at Aeclanum in Samnium during the middle portion of the second century.
- Staia Procula, along with her sons, Raius Proculus and Raius Clemens, dedicated a tomb at Terventum in Samnium, dating to the second century, or the early part of the third, for her husband, Marcus Raius Fronto, aged sixty-eight.
- Staius Silvanus, dedicated a tomb at Rome, dating to the late second century, for his wife, Venuleia Vitulia.
- Staia Thisbe, the wife of Gaius Numisius Elenchus, with whom she dedicated a late second-century tomb at Aufidenia in Samnium for their son, Gaius Numisius Elenchus, aged five.
- Lucius Staius L. l. Repentinus, a small child buried at Rome, aged two, in a tomb dating to the late second or early third century.
- Lucius Staius L. f. Herodotus, made an offering to Silvanus at the site of modern Monte Rocchetta, formerly part of Venetia and Histria, dating between the late second and middle of the third century.
- Staia Quartilla, buried at Atina in Lucania, aged thirty-five years, eleven months, and eighteen days, with a monument from her husband, Antonius Felicianus, dating from the late second century, or the first half of the third.
- Lucius Staius L. f. Scrateius Manilianus, one of the municipal duumvirs at Beneventum in Samnium in AD 231.
- Staia Grumentina, buried in a third-century tomb at Atina, with a monument from her husband, Gaius Apidius Faustus.
- Staia, buried at Rome in a tomb dedicated by Simplicius, her husband of thirty years, and dating to the latter half of the fourth century.

=== Undated Staii ===
- Staia, a woman buried at Rome.
- Staius Primus, a veteran named in an inscription from Brixia in Venetia and Histria.
- Marcus Staius Achilleus, one of the Seviri Augustales, dedicated a tomb for Sextus Sammius Firminus at the present site of Jongieux, formerly part of Gallia Narbonensis.
- Marcus Staius Aeschinus, buried at Lugdunum in Gallia Lugdunensis.
- Publius Staius Agathopus, together with Lucius Passienus Eros, dedicated a sepulchre at Rome for themselves and their families.
- Lucius Staius L. l. Antigonus, a freedman at Narbo in Gallia Narbonensis, who dedicated a sepulchre for Staia Do[...].
- Gnaeus Staius Cn. l. Castus, a freedman buried in a family sepulchre at Rome, along with Gnaeus Staius Servius, Staia Thalea, and Staia Maxima.
- Staia Do[...], buried at Narbo, in a tomb dedicated by Lucius Staius Antigonus.
- Staius Eudromus, buried at the present site of Conjux, formerly part of Gallia Narbonensis, with a monument from his wife, Amatia Marcella.
- Publius Staius Eutychianus, made a donation to Jupiter at Pagus Veianus in Samnium.
- Staius Felix, buried at Compsa in Samnium, with a monument from his wife, Herennia Secunda.
- Lucius Staius L. f. Herodotus, buried at Beneventum, aged five years, eight months, and fifteen days, with a monument from hs brother, Lucius Staius Rutilius Manilius.
- Staia Hilaritas, dedicated a monument at Larinum in Samnium to her son, Staius Maximianus.
- Staius Justinus, buried at Casinum, in a tomb dedicated by his wife, Aemilia Tertia.
- Staia Lycaethis, dedicated a tomb at Rome for her sister, Philete.
- Staia Cn. l. Maxima, a freedwoman buried in a family sepulchre at Rome, along with Gnaeus Staius Servius, Staia Thalea, and Gnaeus Staius Castus.
- Staius Maximianus, buried at Larinum, aged eighteen, with a monument from his mother, Staia Hilaritas.
- Publius Staius P. l. Meridianus, a freedman buried at Ebora in Lusitania.
- Staia Musa, along with her son-in-law, Fructus, dedicated a monument at Rome to her daughter, Staia Verula.
- Lucius Staius L. f. Nema, buried at Pisaurum in Umbria, along with Teia Galla.
- Staia Nysias, the wife of Gaius Staius Priscus, with whom she dedicated a tomb at Ostia in Latium for their son, Gaius Staius Victor.
- Staia M. f. Prisca, named in an inscription from Rome.
- Gaius Staius Priscus, along with his wife Staia Nysias, dedicated a tomb at Ostia for their son, Gaius Staius Victor.
- Lucius Staius L. f. Rutilius Manilius, dedicated a tomb at Beneventum to his young brother, Lucius Staius Herodotus.
- Staius Saecillus, named in a sepulchral inscription from Brixia.
- Staia Saturnina, named in a sepulchral inscription from Vienna in Gallia Narbonensis.
- Gnaeus Staius Cn. l. Servius, a freedman buried in a family sepulchre at Rome, along with Staia Thalea, Staia Maxima, and Gnaeus Staius Castus.
- Staia Cn. l. Thalea, a freedwoman buried in a family sepulchre at Rome, along with Gnaeus Staius Servius, Staia Maxima, and Gnaeus Staius Castus.
- Staia Verula, buried at Rome, with a monument from her mother, Staia Musa, and husband, Fructus.
- Gaius Staius C. f. Victor, an infant buried at Ostia, aged one year, ten months, and eleven days, with a monument from his parents, Gaius Staius Priscus and Staia Nysias.

== See also ==
- List of Roman gentes

== Bibliography ==
- Marcus Tullius Cicero, Epistulae ad Atticum, Epistulae ad Brutum, Epistulae ad Familiares, Philippicae.
- Gaius Julius Caesar, Commentarii de Bello Civili (Commentaries on the Civil War).
- Titus Livius (Livy), History of Rome.
- Marcus Velleius Paterculus, Roman History.
- Flavius Josephus, Antiquitates Judaïcae (Antiquities of the Jews), Bellum Judaïcum (The Jewish War).
- Publius Cornelius Tacitus, Annales.
- Appianus Alexandrinus (Appian), Bellum Civile (The Civil War).
- Lucius Cassius Dio Cocceianus (Cassius Dio), Roman History.
- Dictionary of Greek and Roman Biography and Mythology, William Smith, ed., Little, Brown and Company, Boston (1849).
- Theodor Mommsen et alii, Corpus Inscriptionum Latinarum (The Body of Latin Inscriptions, abbreviated CIL), Berlin-Brandenburgische Akademie der Wissenschaften (1853–present).
- Giovanni Battista de Rossi, Inscriptiones Christianae Urbis Romanae Septimo Saeculo Antiquiores (Christian Inscriptions from Rome of the First Seven Centuries, abbreviated ICUR), Vatican Library, Rome (1857–1861, 1888).
- René Cagnat et alii, L'Année épigraphique (The Year in Epigraphy, abbreviated AE), Presses Universitaires de France (1888–present).
- August Pauly, Georg Wissowa, et alii, Realencyclopädie der Classischen Altertumswissenschaft (Scientific Encyclopedia of the Knowledge of Classical Antiquities, abbreviated RE or PW), J. B. Metzler, Stuttgart (1894–1980).
- George Davis Chase, "The Origin of Roman Praenomina", in Harvard Studies in Classical Philology, vol. VIII, pp. 103–184 (1897).
- Paul von Rohden, Elimar Klebs, & Hermann Dessau, Prosopographia Imperii Romani (The Prosopography of the Roman Empire, abbreviated PIR), Berlin (1898).
- La Carte Archéologique de la Gaule (Archaeological Map of Gaul, abbreviated CAG), Académie des Inscriptions et Belles-Lettres (1931–present).
- Inscriptiones Italiae (Inscriptions from Italy), Rome (1931-present).
- T. Robert S. Broughton, The Magistrates of the Roman Republic, American Philological Association (1952–1986).
- Giuseppe Camodeca, "Nuove iscrizioni funerarie latine di epoca tardorepubblicana da Cumae" ("New Latin Funerary Inscriptions from Late Republican Cumae"), in Colonie e municipi nell'era digitale, pp. 47–70, Tivoli (2017).
- Manfred Clauss, Anne Kolb, Wolfgang A. Slaby, & Barbara Woitas, Epigraphik-Datenbank Clauss/Slaby (EDCS), University of Zürich.
