= Malga Artillone =

Mountain pasture located on Monte Baldo

Coordinates: 45°44′01″N 10°52′03″E

The Artillone hut (or Artilone or Artilóm ) is one of the mountain pastures located on Monte Baldo, in the municipality of Avio, in the autonomous province of Trento, Italy. It is called Bubeskopf in Germany.

== History ==
The area has been attested since 1762 by the historical cartography of Trentino, but its being frequented since the Bronze Age has been evidenced by the discovery of a bronze knife with an open handle and terminal ring, dating between the 12th and the 11th century BC. The name of the place seems to derive from the Gallic root arto- translated as "bear", indicating a probable presence of this type of animal at the time of the Celtic population of the area.

The area was the seat of the Austrian high command during some clashes that took place between May and July 1796 near Monte Baldo and saw the troops of General von Melas pitted against part of the Italian Army, in the context of the Italian Campaign.

The use of the mountain pasture has continued throughout the 19th century and until today.

== Description ==
The land is bordered by a wooden fence without a gate and contains three buildings. The main building is characterized by a long, narrow structure, made of plastered concrete with a double-pitched roof, made of wood covered with metal sheets. A second building, behind it, has a concrete skeleton with wooden parts, and is used as a stable. All around lies the Artilon, a vast wooded and pasture area from Cima Pozzette to the Monte Baldo provincial road.
