= Peace Trail =

Peace Trail may refer to:

- Peace Trail (hiking trail), an Alpine hiking trail in northern Italy
- Peace Trail (album), a 2016 album by Neil Young
- Peace Trail (Wisconsin), a bike trail in Janesville, Wisconsin
