= Lago di Prà della Stua =

Lake in Italy

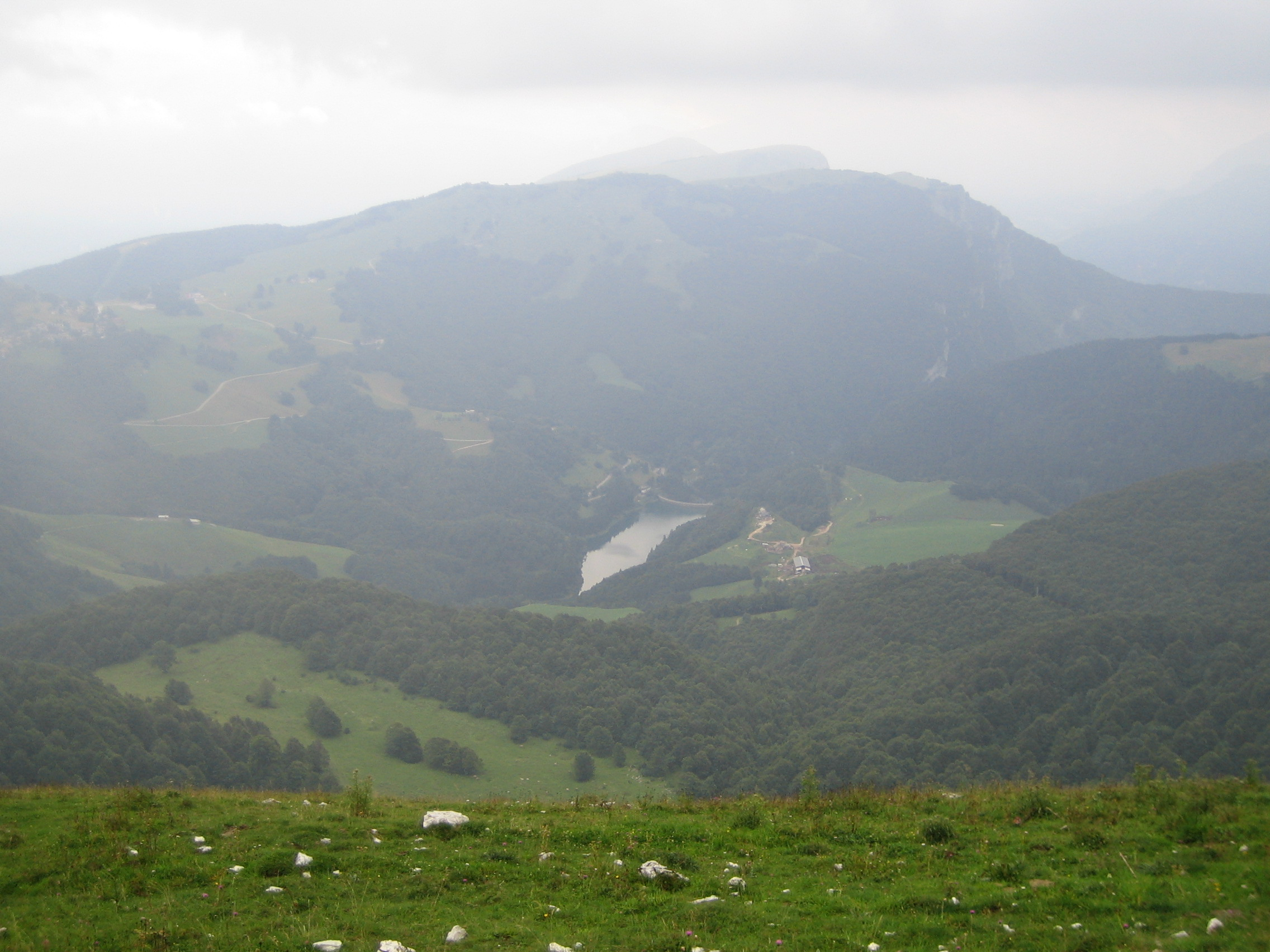
- Lake seen from country road SP3 with peak Corno della Paura in the background.

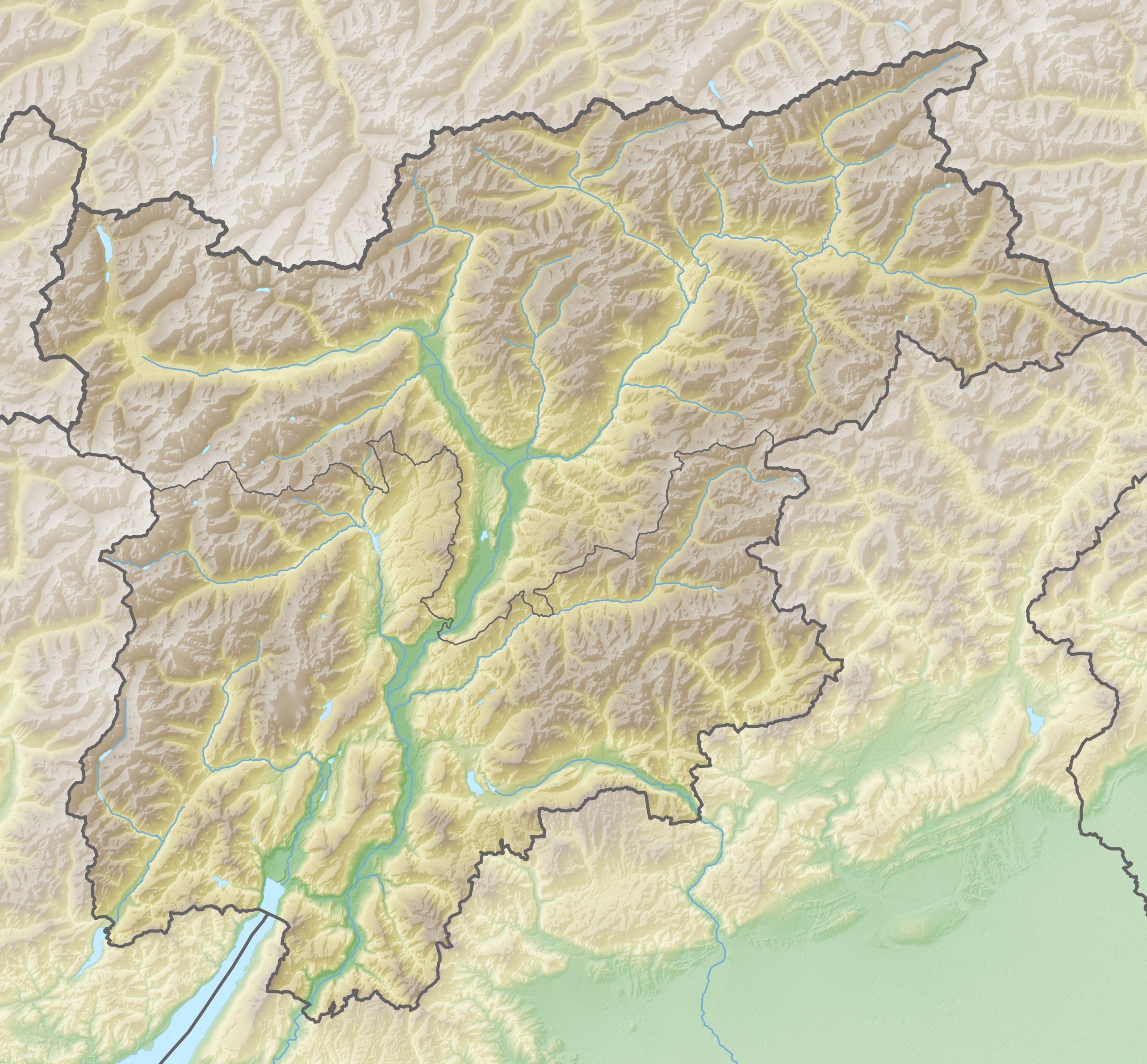
- Location within Trentino-Alto Adige/Südtirol
- Location: Trentino
- Coordinates: 45.773°N 10.899°E
- Type: Reservoir
- Primary inflows: Torrente Aviana
- Primary outflows: Torrente Aviana → Etsch
- Basin countries: Italy
- Max. length: 0.600 km (0.373 mi)
- Max. width: 0.050 km (0.031 mi)
- Surface elevation: 1,050 m (3,440 ft)
- Islands: 0
- Settlements: San Valentino

Lago di Prà della Stua is a barrier lake in Trentino, Italy. The lake is at an elevation of 1050 m and retains the waters of the stream Torrente Aviana close to the country road Strada Provinciale dei Dossioli. Besides the Lago di Loppio this is the only major body of water in the Monte Baldo massif.
