= Cima delle Pozzette =

Mountain in Italy

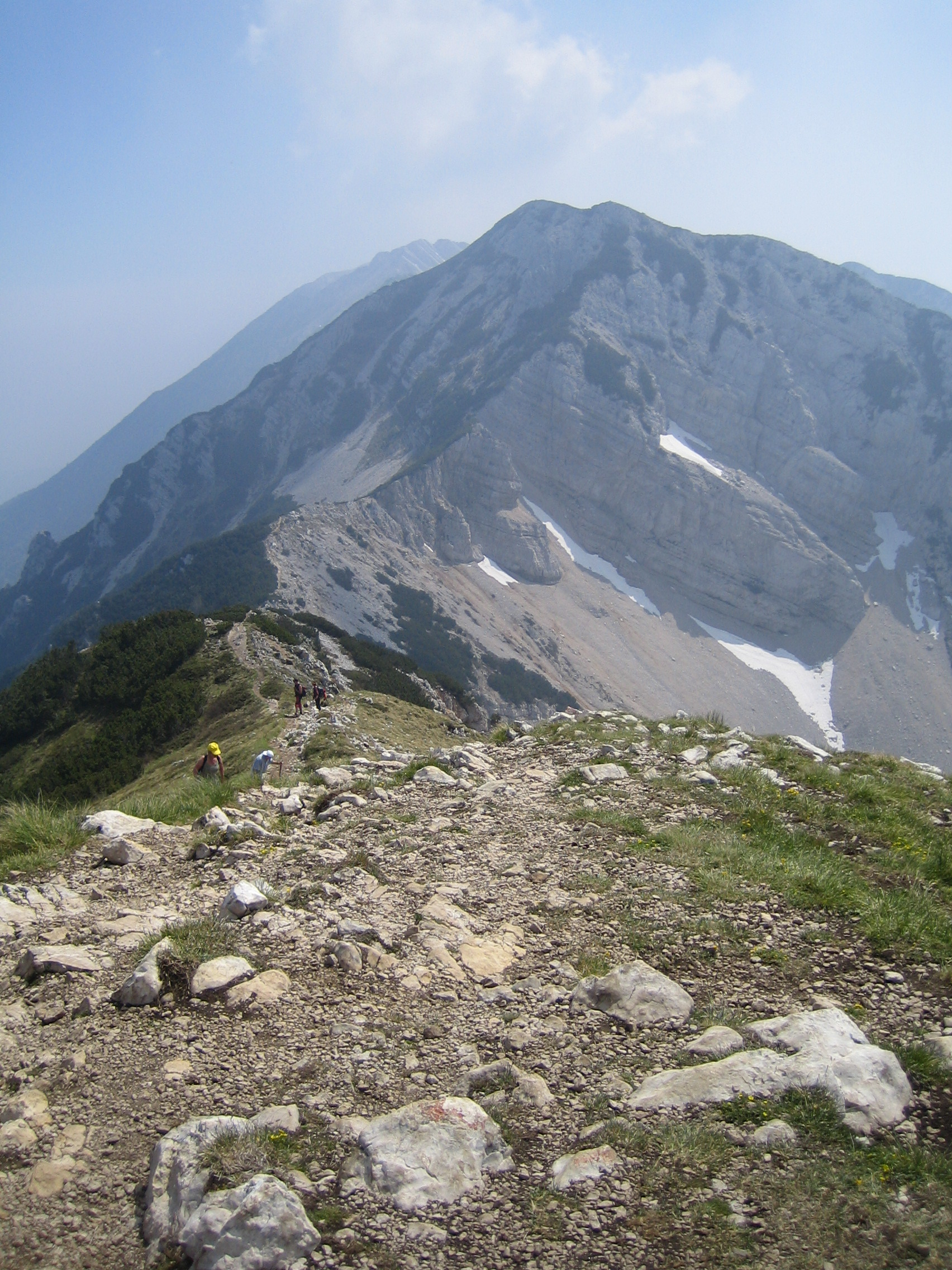
- Cima delle Pozzette summit with view to the south to Cima Valdritta

Highest point
- Elevation: 2,132 m (6,995 ft)
- Coordinates: 45°44′04″N 10°50′59″E

Geography
- Location within Italy
- Location: Veneto, northern Italy
- Parent range: Alps, Brescia and Garda Prealps

Climbing
- Easiest route: rock/snow climb

Cima delle Pozzette is one of the highest summits of the Monte Baldo mountain range and thereby part of the Garda Mountains in northern Italy.

== Morphology ==
Cima delle Pozzette is one of the highest peaks of the Monte Baldo range, that roughly extends from north to south. Other prominent peaks in the range are Punta Telegrafo and Cima Valdritta to the south.

== Access ==
The summit can be reached from the south via Punta Telegrafo passing Cima Valdritta as a long hike over the Monte Baldo mountain ridge, or easiest from north from the summit station of the cable car from Malcesine.

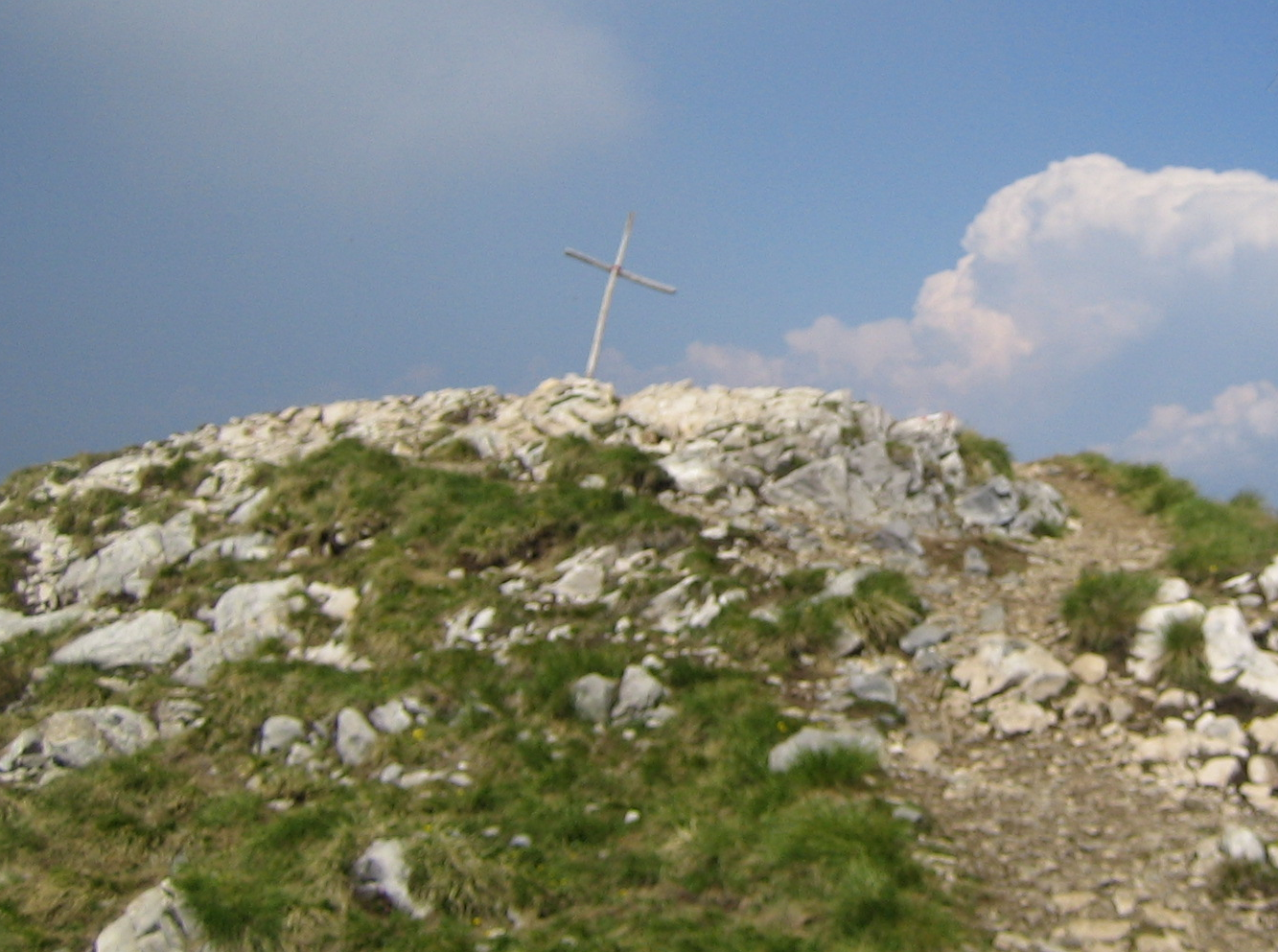
Cross at summit.
