= Nago–Torbole =

Nago-Torbole
- Comune
- Comune di Nago-Torbole
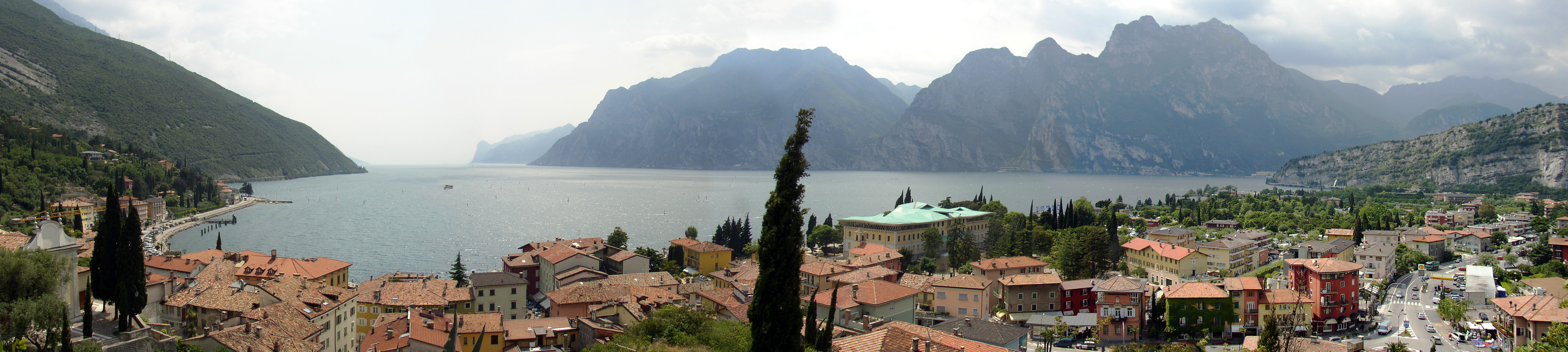

- Location within Italy Location within Trentino-Alto Adige/Südtirol
- Coordinates: 45°52′N 10°53′E
- Country: Italy
- Region: Trentino-Alto Adige/Südtirol
- Province: Trentino (TN)
- Frazioni: Torbole, Nago, Tempesta

Government
  - Mayor: Gianni Morandi

Area
  - Total: 28.39 km^{2} (10.96 sq mi)
- Elevation: 65 m (213 ft)

Population (2026)
  - Total: 2,732
  - Density: 96.23/km^{2} (249.2/sq mi)
- Demonym(s): Torbolani, Naghesi
- Time zone: UTC+1 (CET)
  - Summer (DST): UTC+2 (CEST)
- Postal code: 38060, 38069
- Dialing code: 0464
- Website: Official website

Nago–Torbole (Nach e Tùrbule in local dialect) is a comune (municipality) in Trentino in the northern Italian region Trentino-Alto Adige/Südtirol, located about 30 kilometres (19 miles) southwest of Trento on the north shore of Lake Garda.

The municipality of Nago–Torbole contains the frazioni (subdivisions, mainly villages and hamlets) Torbole (Turbel), Nago (Naag), and Tempesta. The villages cling to the limestone rocks on the extreme north-west slope of Monte Baldo; it lies close to the mouth of the river Sarca and its houses are set as an amphitheater around the small bay, in front of Monte Rocchetta and the Ledro Alps.

Nago–Torbole borders the following municipalities: Arco, Riva del Garda, Mori, Ledro, Brentonico, and Malcesine.

== Torbole ==
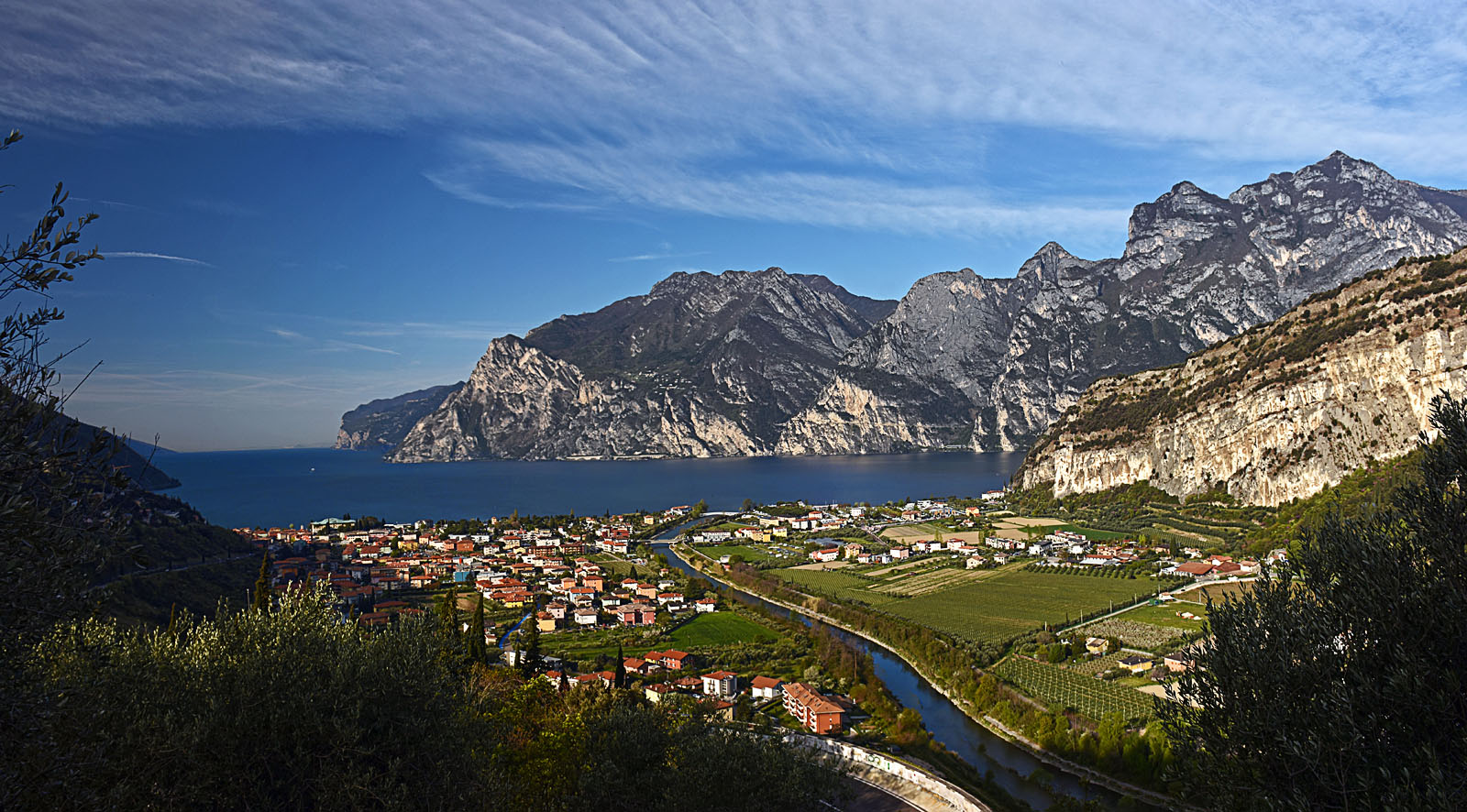
Torbole from above

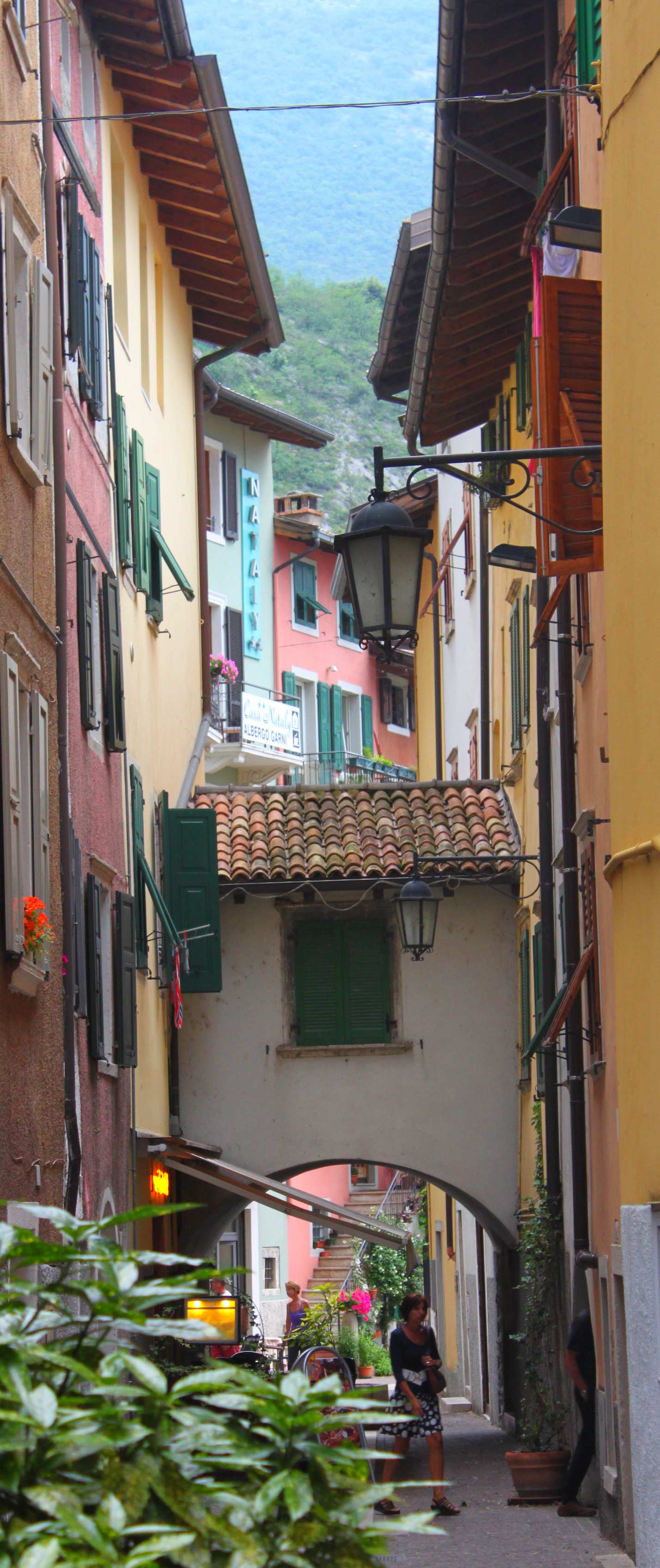
Via Segantini, a back street in Torbole.

Torbole, at 67 metres (220 ft) above sea level, is situated on the extreme north-western appendix of the Baldo chain and it is set as an amphitheatre on Lake Garda. The lake, once only valuable to fishermen and traders, is still the most precious resource together with 2,079-metre (6,821 ft) high Monte Baldo, which was once a seemingly inexhaustible mine of firewood and game though now it is a protected area for its rare flora, some of which are endemic to the area.

== Nago ==
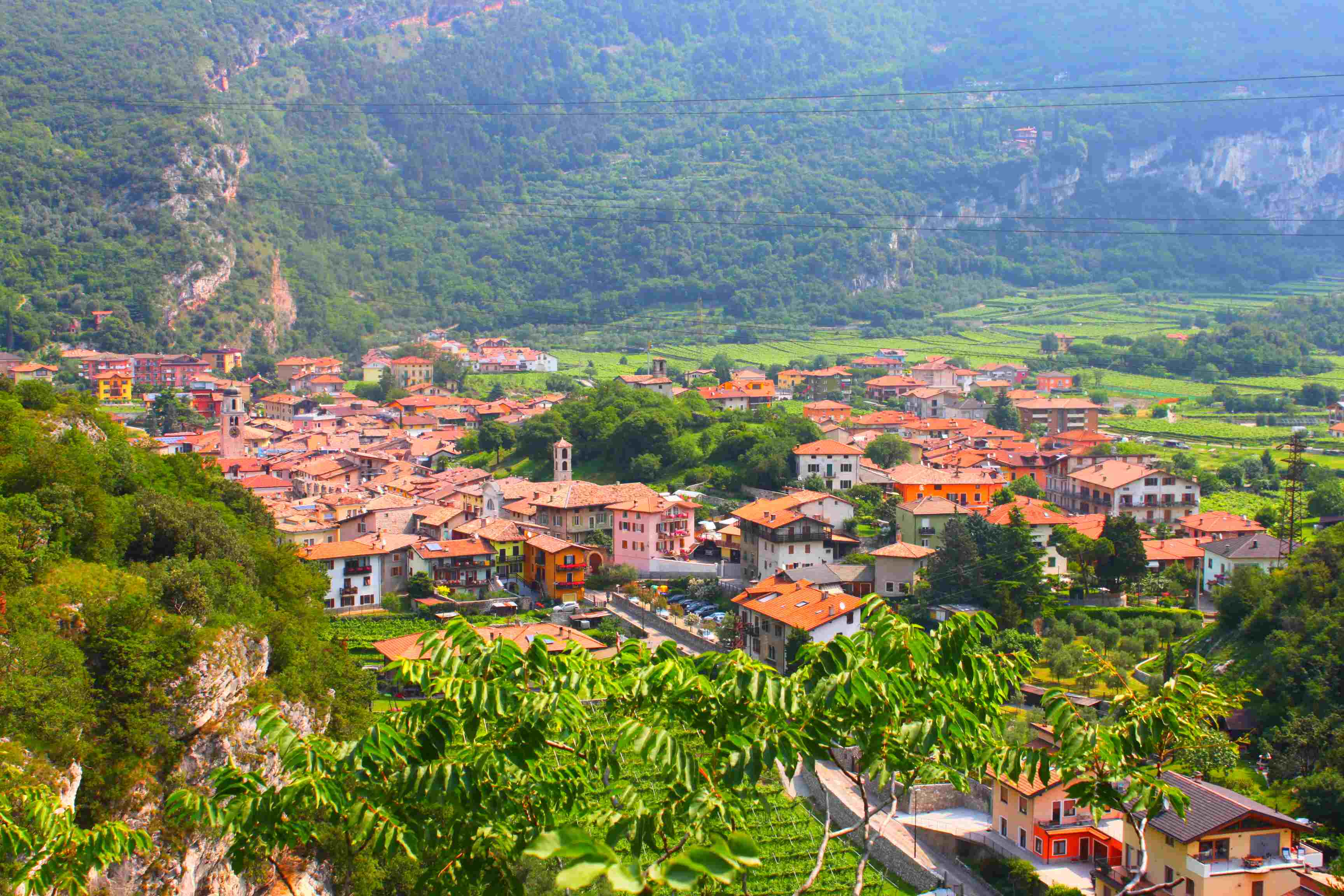
A view of Nago from Penede castle.

Situated on the hills above Torbole sits Nago. The parish church of Nago, San Vigilio, is located on the town's main road. The present building dates from the late 16th century, but the first church probably dates from the early Christian period. It is mentioned for the first time in 1203, in a document relating to a dispute between the people of Nago and the Bishop of Trento, Conrad II de Beseno. It is called "collegiate" in the document and its importance at the time must have been considerable.

== History ==
Venetian domination (1440–1510) is evident in the old harbor: a typical toll house placed on a lake-front wharf. Goethe, who stopped here in September 1786, described in his writings a longing and passionate image of this place. During Austrian domination (1810–1918), tourism grew during the Belle Époque.

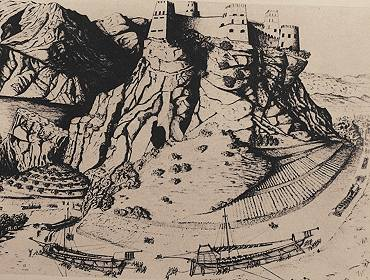
15th century print of Venetian ships.

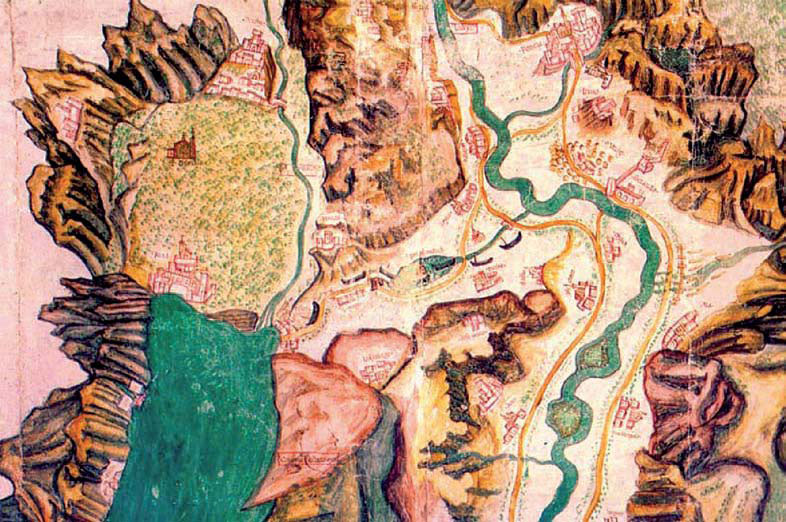
Map of the route taken by the Venetian fleet through the valley of Loppio, by the Adige River to the Lake Garda.

This area was populated in prehistoric times and colonized during the Imperial Roman times; it formed a community with Nago, castle residence of the Counts d'Arco. In 1439 Torbole was involved in the Third Lombard War (1438), between the Duchy of Milan and the Republic of Venice. The latter dominated the eastern side of the lake (the Riviera). In order to gain supremacy on Lake Garda and help the Venetian condottiero Gattamelata, in freeing Brescia from the Milanese siege, the Venetians transported twenty-five boats and six galleys from the Adriatic Sea up the River Adige to the fluvial harbour of Mori. From here the boats were hauled further by oxen and manual labour until they could be launched into Lake Loppio, then further hauled along the slopes of Monte Baldo into Lake Garda at Torbole. This exploit cost 240 oxen and 15,000 ducats. In April 1440 the small Venetian fleet destroyed Visconti's fleet and conquered Riva del Garda.

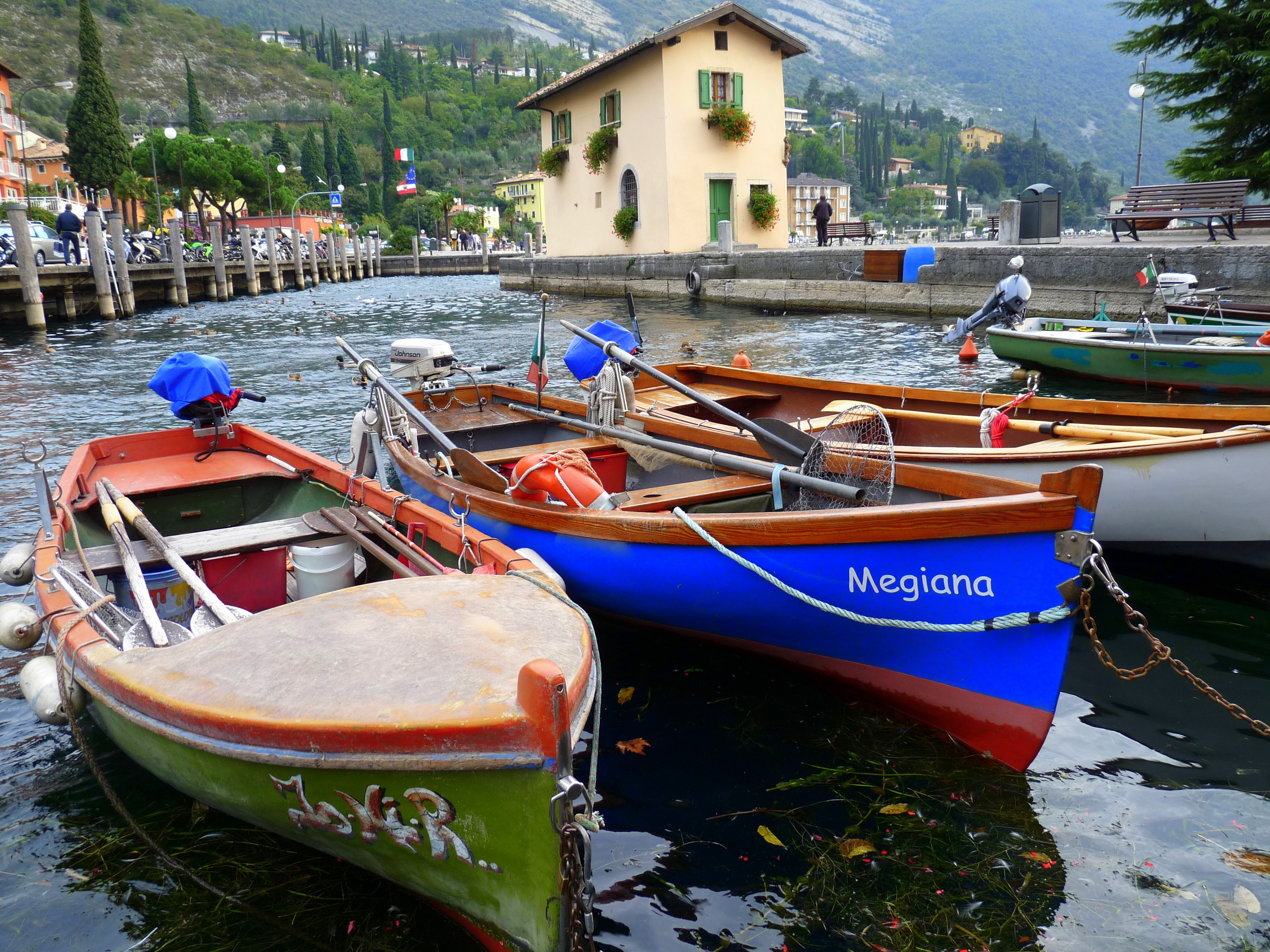
Lake Garda at Torbole's harbor.

Torbole, as early as the 15th century, was a stop for European travelers passing through on the Atesina road from Germany to Italy. Montaigne visited it in 1580. Goethe arrived here from Rovereto in the afternoon of 12 September 1786, four days after having crossed Brenner Pass. Goethe was 37 years old and upon seeing the blue expanse of Lake Garda and the silver olive-groves, he experienced for the first time the atmosphere and mild climate of the places extolled by the Classics, and he wrote that he had achieved happiness. The Brescian Cesare Arici, idyllic rural poet, exalted the "fishy Torbole". The painter Hans Lietzmann bought a large olive grove on the lake's shore (behind the Hotel Paradiso) and opened a school of nude art.

== World War II and Liberation ==
Late April 1945: As Allied forces advanced, German troops began retreating from northern Italy, including Nago–Torbole, facing pressure from both the Allies and Italian partisans.

April 28–29, 1945: Nago–Torbole experienced significant activity during these final days. Partisan groups and local residents took control of key positions, anticipating the arrival of Allied forces.

Skirmishes and Resistance: Skirmishes occurred between retreating German units and partisans. Some German forces attempted to hold their positions but faced overwhelming pressure from both the partisans and the approaching Allied troops.

Liberation: On April 29, 1945, elements of the U.S. 10th Mountain Division reached Nago–Torbole after advancing through the Po Valley and the foothills of the Alps. The Allied troops were welcomed by local residents and partisans, whose collaboration was instrumental in ensuring a relatively swift and smooth liberation. By the end of April, most of the remaining German forces in the region had either surrendered or fled. The formal surrender of German forces in Italy occurred on May 2, 1945, marking the end of hostilities in the region.

Col. William O. Darby: The Assistant Division Commander of the 10th Mountain Division, Col. William O. Darby, was killed in action in Torbole on April 30, 1945, along with his aide, Sgt. Major John T. Evans, when struck by enemy artillery fire. Darby was posthumously promoted to Brigadier General, the only officer of that rank to be killed in Europe during World War II. A monument in Piazza Lietzmann, in front of the Church of Santa Maria, commemorates Col. Darby and twenty-five U.S. soldiers of the division who remain missing in action after the Lake Garda DUKW sinking. A separate plaque in the courtyard of the former Hotel Geier marks the exact site where Darby and Evans were killed.

U.S. Army Air Corps Aircraft: Above Nago, a U.S. Army Air Corps aircraft crashed during the final days of the war. In the following decades, local residents and the surviving pilot's family commemorated the event with memorial visits and ceremonies.

Associazione Benàch: The Associazione Benàch is a non-profit organization based in Nago–Torbole that studies and preserves local World War II history. It operates a Welcome and Research Centre and has been involved in educational programs, exhibitions, publications, and documentary projects related to the 10th Mountain Division and the region's wartime history. The organization has also proposed the creation of a "Museum of War and Peace" in Torbole to document the local impact of both World Wars.

Annual 40-Mile Challenge: Since 2010, the annual Col. William O. Darby 40-Mile Challenge has been held to honor Col. Darby and the soldiers of the 10th Mountain Division. The event was initiated by Rick Tscherne in collaboration with Ben Appleby and the Associazione Benàch, and has grown into a successful endurance march retracing the division's final advance from the Po Valley to Lake Garda. The challenge typically takes place on or around April 30, the anniversary of Darby's death, attracting civilians, veterans, and serving military personnel from Italy and the United States.

Sister City Relationship: Torbole maintains a sister-city relationship with Fort Smith, Arkansas, Darby's hometown, in recognition of his legacy and the shared commemoration of the 10th Mountain Division.

The Lost Mountaineers Documentary: The award-winning documentary The Lost Mountaineers (2022) recounts these events and their modern remembrance.

== See also ==
- 10th Mountain Division (United States)
- William O. Darby
- Fort Smith, Arkansas
- Lake Garda in World War II

== Main sights ==
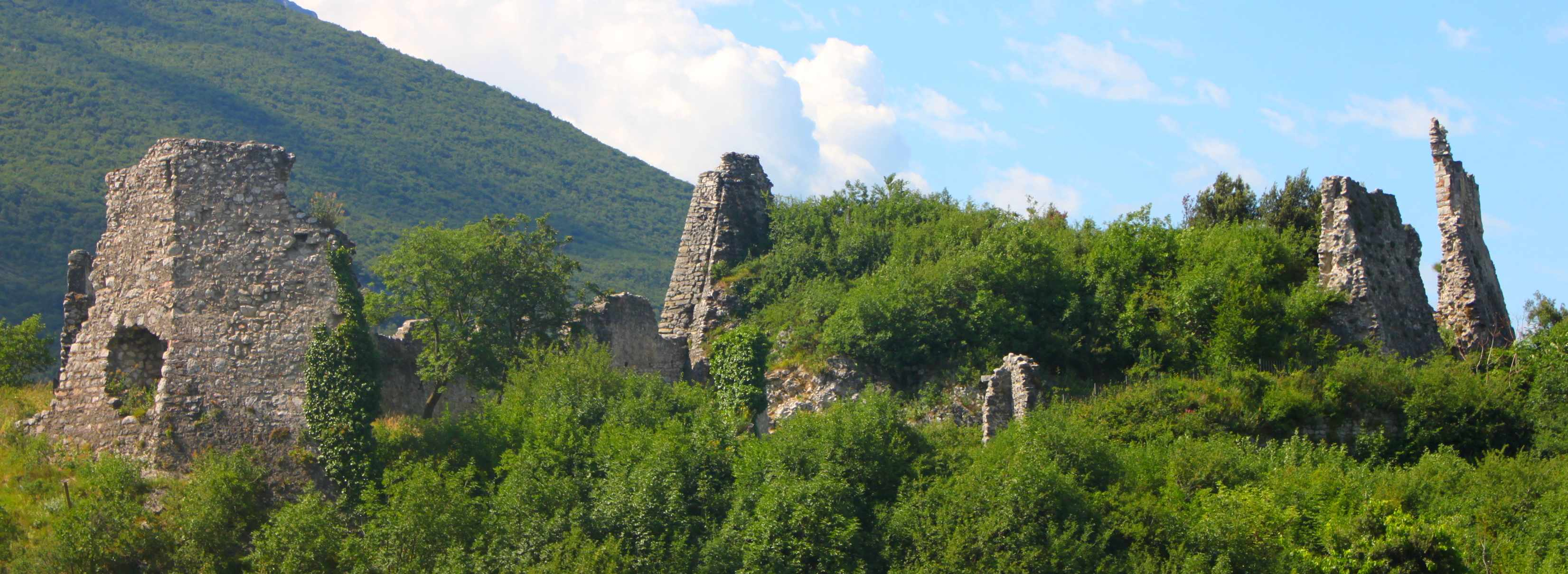
The ruins of Penede castle.

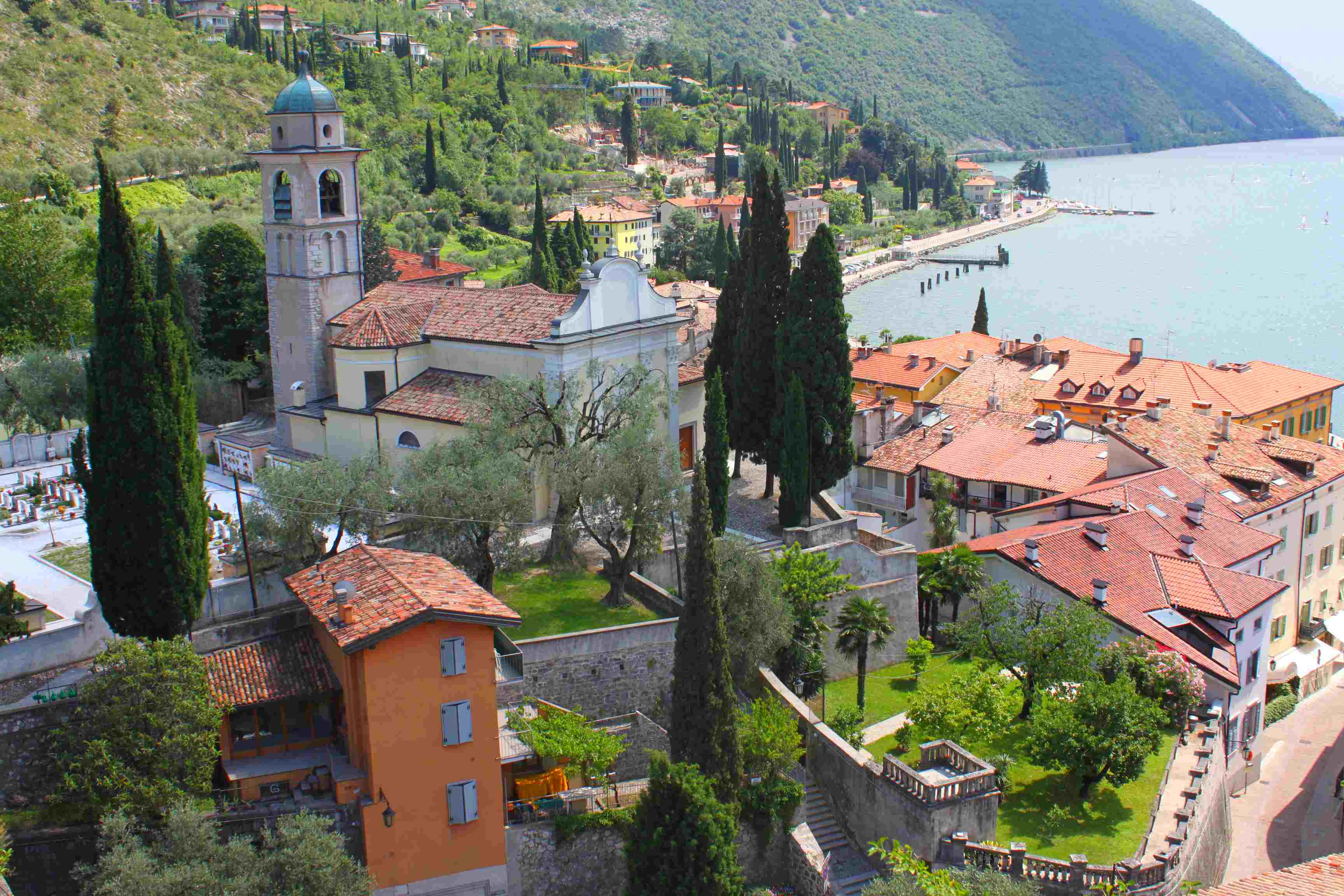
The Saint Andrea church.

The church of Sant'Andrea is first mentioned in a document dated 1175. In 1183 the Pope Lucius III assigned it, together with the surrounding olive grove, to the Cistercian Abbey of Saint Lorenzo in Trento, Italy. In 1497 some of the properties of the Church were given for the support of a priest who would look after the Torbole Community. In 1741 the curate of Torbole had been founded and in 1839 the church was officially consecrated. After being ravaged by French troops in 1703, the church was rebuilt in the Late Baroque style, but some architectural elements have been recovered, as testified by the dates sculptured on the base of the two rocky arches of the transept. The altar piece in the apse represents the martyrdom of Saint Andrea, by Giambettino Cignaroli. A painted vertical sundial can be seen on the church's lake facing wall and on the opposite side is a small cemetery. The parish Saint Andrea church is divided into three naves and keeps a wooden chorus. Another artwork is the 18th-century canvas by Giambettino Cignaroli representing the Saint Andrea martyrdom.

A walk brings to the ruins of Penede castle, which was destroyed in the 18th century. It had been owned by the Arco earls, by the Castelbanco's and by the Republic of Venice.

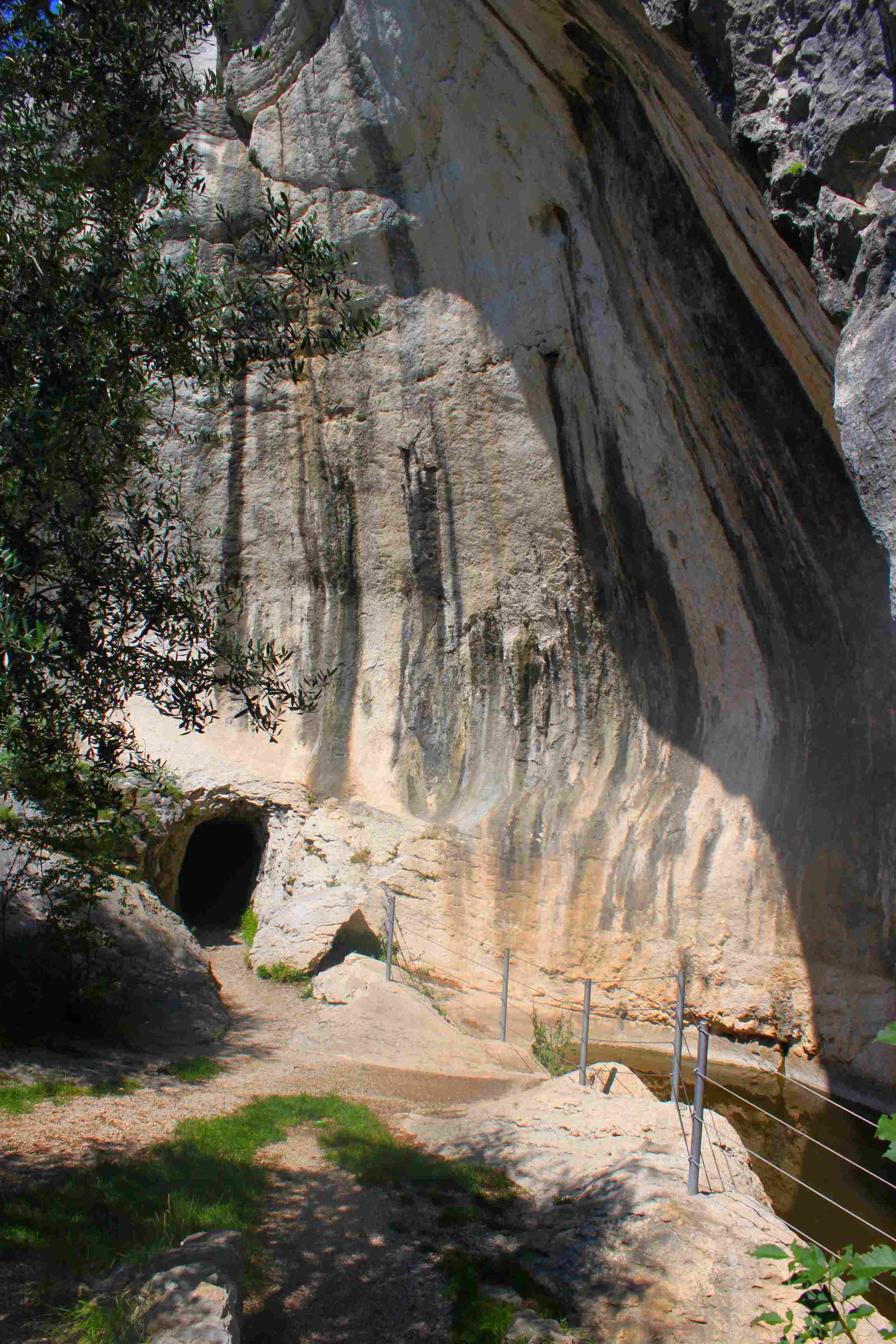
Cliff wall on road to Nago.

In the Hairpin bends of the road that brings to Nago are the so-called Giant's pot (Italian: Marmitte dei Giganti) representing the evidence of erosive phenomena from the glacial era, which occurred when a wide glacier covered the territories. Those so called Marmitte are sunken glacial era wells, set out by the stones and glacial, quick whirling, detritus coming down from the superior layers.

== Cuisine ==
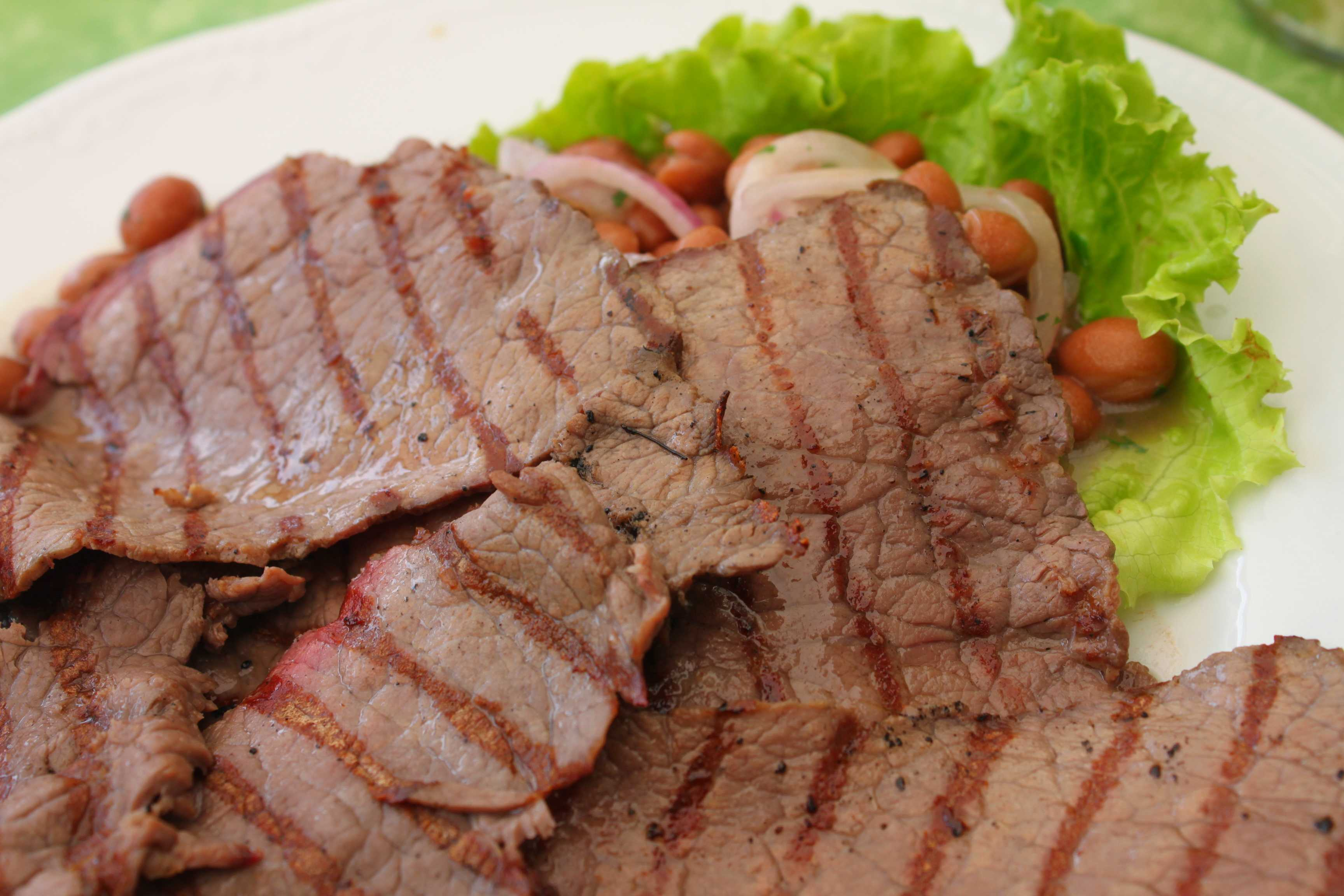
Carne Salada and beans.

Local cuisine is based on some typical elements of the Trentino simple plain fare such as polenta and game.

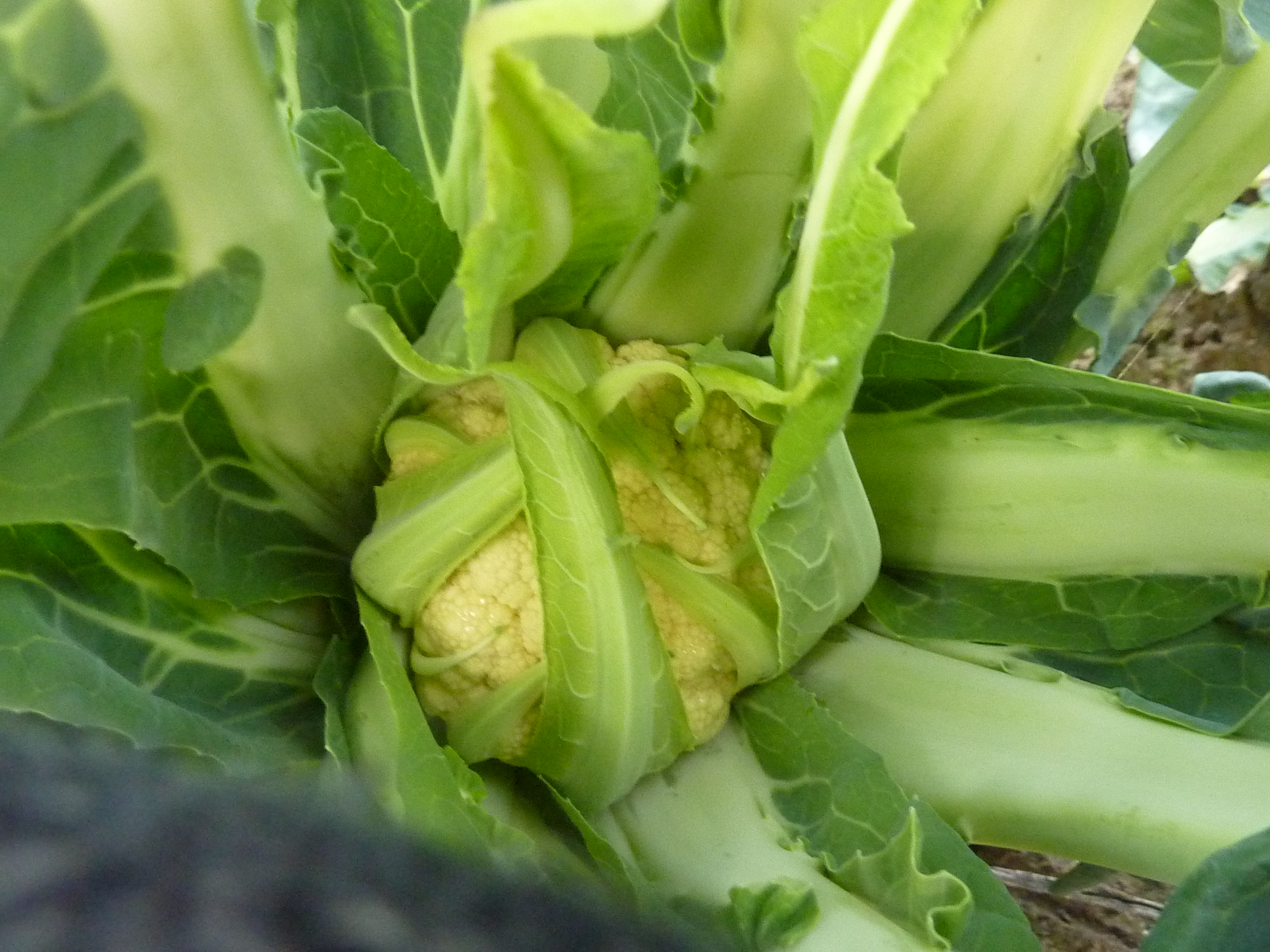
Il Broccolo di Torbole

The broccoli di Torbole (Brassica oleracea var. botrytis) are a variety of cauliflower or broccoflower imported from Verona around the mid-18th century. Inside the large cabbage family, broccoli di Torbole has become separate variety in its cultivar group. After its seedling stage, it grows rapidly and without special care, but needs to be watered frequently. Maturation begins at the beginning of November and ends in April. It has a small estimated harvest of 30,000 heads per year.

== Sports ==
The lake is a windsurfing, kiteboarding and sailing destination, with many sports centres available to visitors and championships running throughout the year.

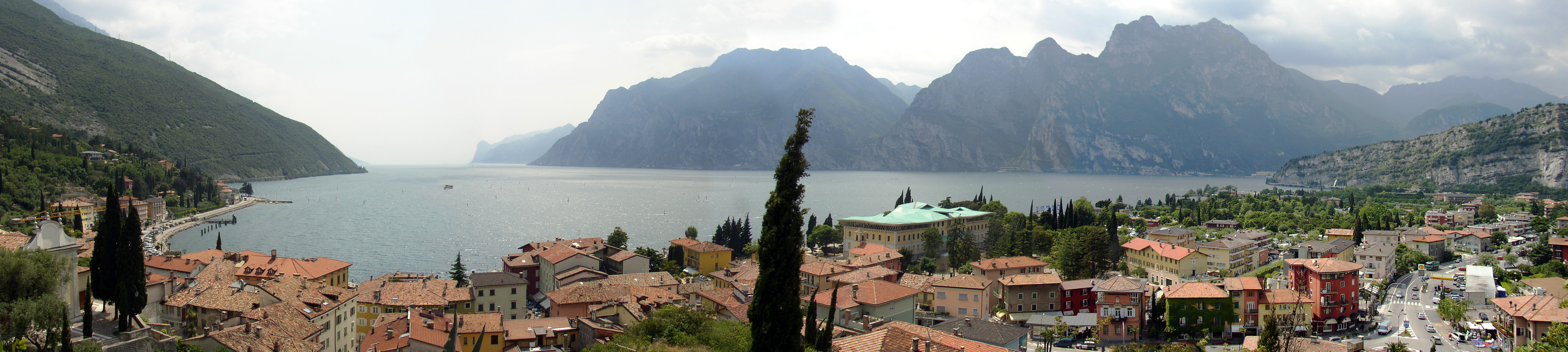
Panoramic view of Torbole.

=== Windsurf and Sailing ===
The main winds on the north of Lake Garda are the Ora and the Peler. The Ora is a south wind, which starts at noon and blows until the early evening hours. The Pelér (also known under the name Vento (ital. for wind) is a north wind, which starts blowing in the second half of the night and continues until late morning. Those winds make Torbole an ideal place for sailing and windsurfing for both, beginners and advanced riders.

The sailing center (Circolo Vela Torbole) founded in 1964 counts 180 associates. It is one of the most important nationally known in Europe. Its regattas usually host international champions and national teams.

The windsurfing club (Circolo Surf Torbole) founded in 1979 and counts 250 associates, including the Olympic champion Alessandra Sensini. Among the national and international events hosted, three editions of the world championships are especially remembered (1988, 1992 and 2006).
