= Cima Valdritta =

Mountain in Italy

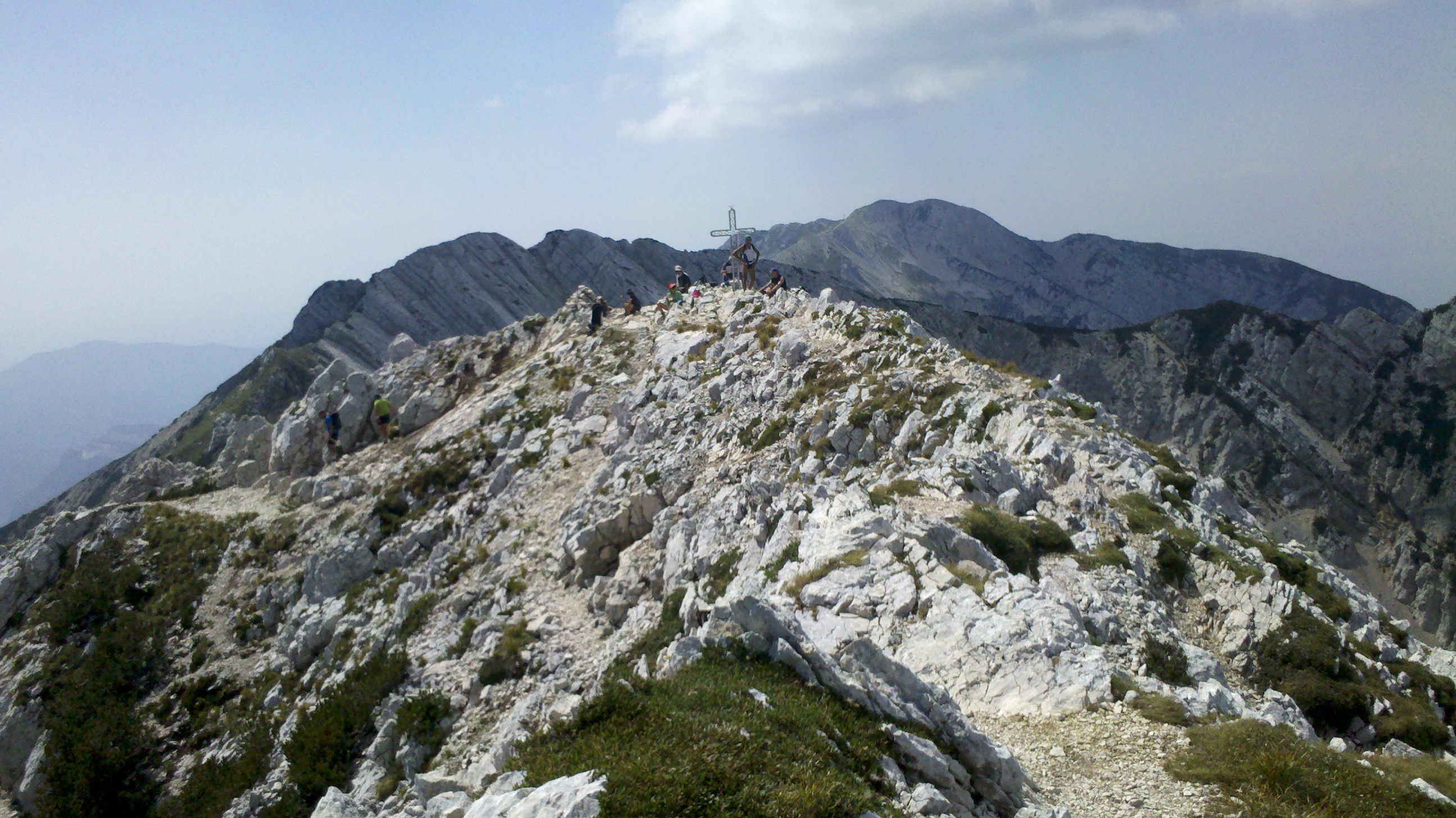
- Cima Valdritta summit

Highest point
- Elevation: 2,218 m (7,277 ft)
- Prominence: 1,950 m (6,400 ft)
- Listing: Ultra
- Coordinates: 45°43′35″N 10°50′38″E

Geography
- Location within Italy
- Location: Veneto, northern Italy
- Parent range: Alps, Brescia and Garda Prealps

Climbing
- Easiest route: rock/snow climb

Cima Valdritta is the highest summit of the Monte Baldo mountain range and thereby part of the Garda Mountains in northern Italy.

== Morphology ==
The Cima Valdritta summit is the highest peak of the Monte Baldo range, that roughly extends from north to south. Other prominent peaks in the range are Punta Telegrafo to the south and Cima delle Pozzette to the north. On the western slopes is the impressive Valdritta cirque. The summit is rocky and just above the tree line.

== Hiking ==
The summit can be reached from the south via Punta Telegrafo, from the north as a long hike over the Monte Baldo mountain ridge, from the west through the Valdritta cirque or fastest from the east, a steep track starting at the country road SP3.

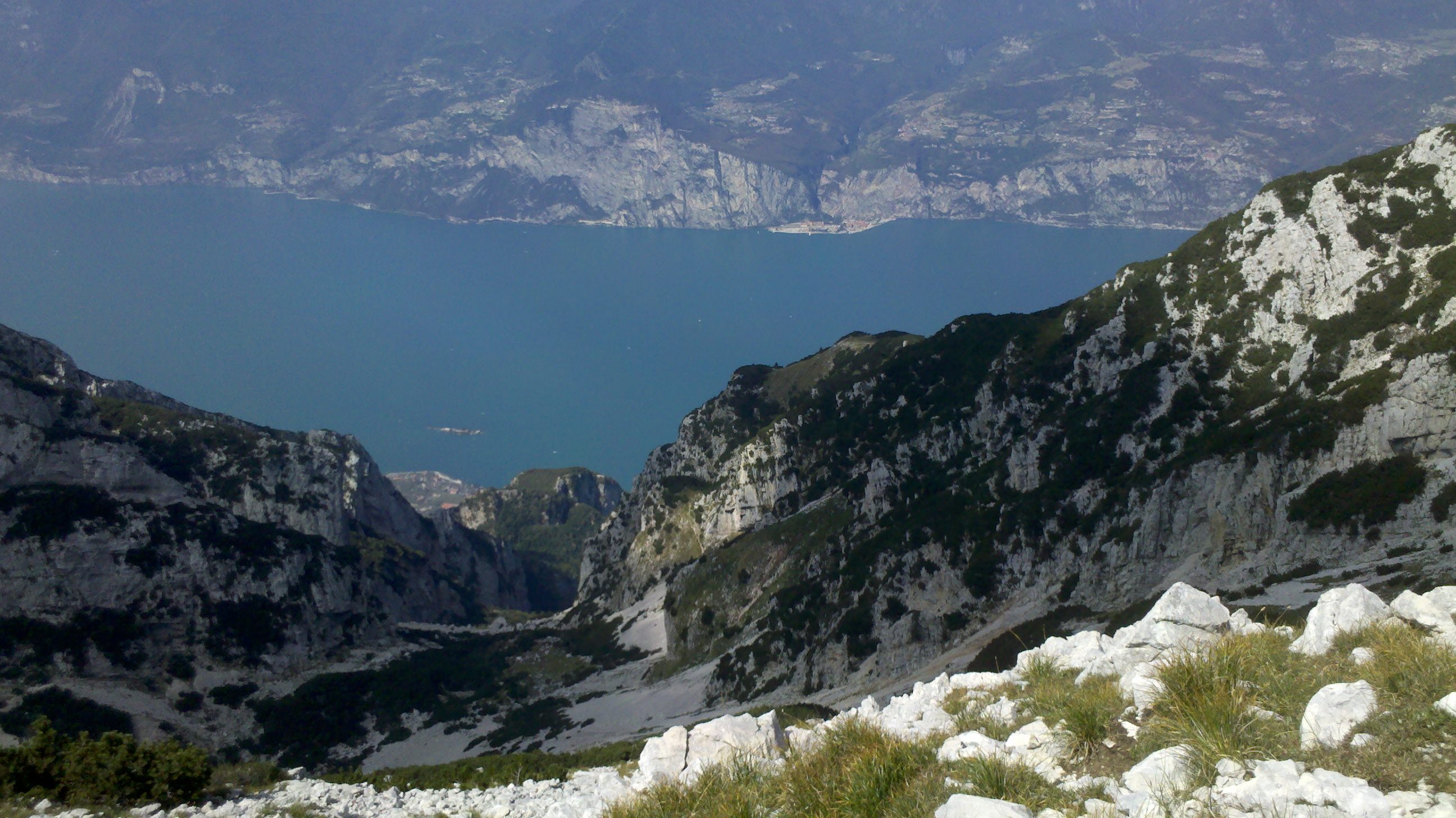
View into Valdritta cirque down to Lake Garda

== See also ==
- List of Alpine peaks by prominence
