= Monte Rocchetta =

Mountain in Italy

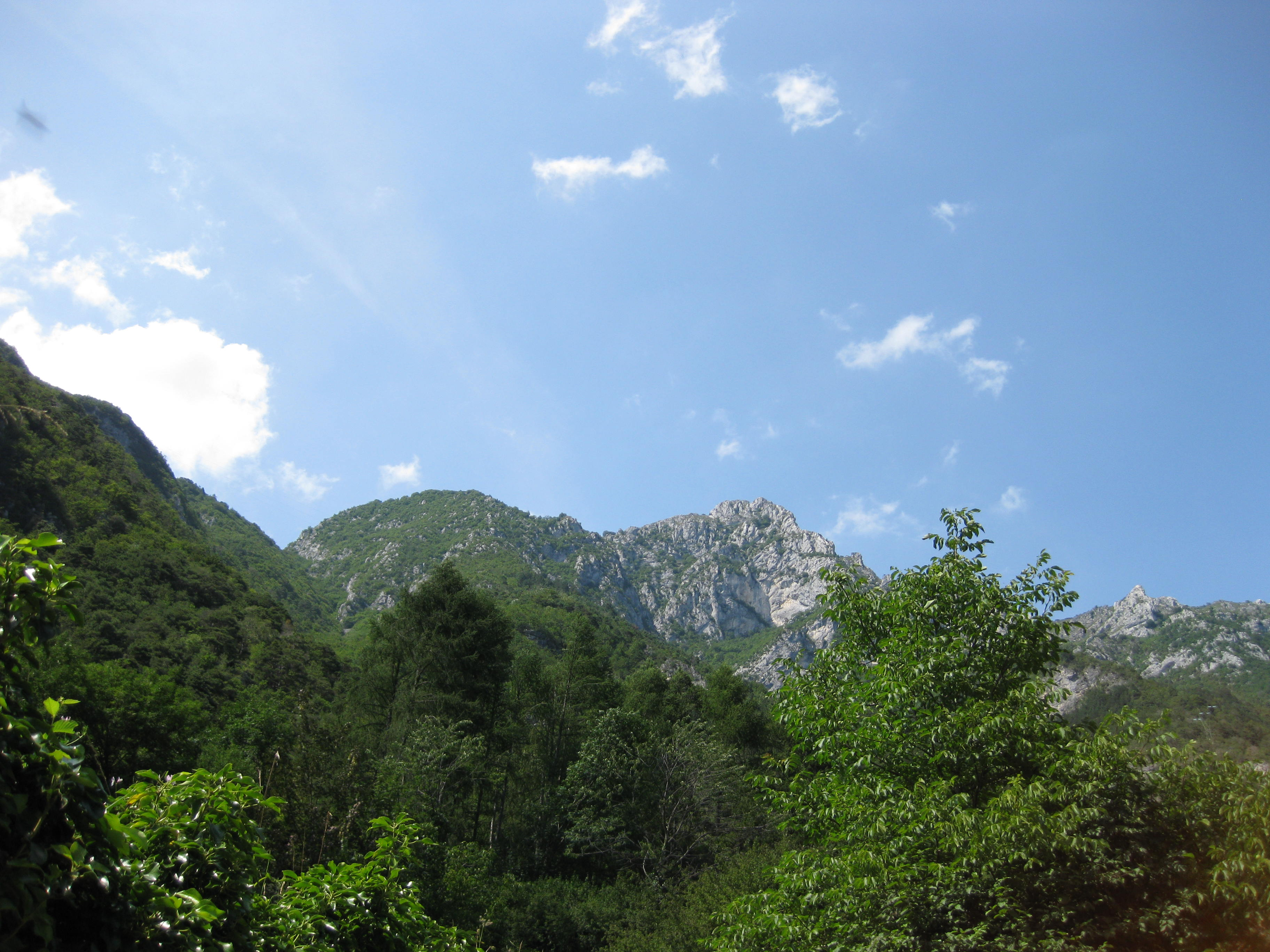
- Monte Rocchetta, view from the road between Biacesa di Ledro and Bochet de Concoli.

Highest point
- Elevation: 1,575 m (5,167 ft)
- Coordinates: 45°53′13″N 10°48′51″E

Geography
- Location within Italy
- Location: Lake Garda, Italy

Monte Rocchetta is a 1,575 m mountain near Lake Garda, close to the city of Riva del Garda in the Trentino province of Italy.
