= Lago di Tenno =

Lake in Italy

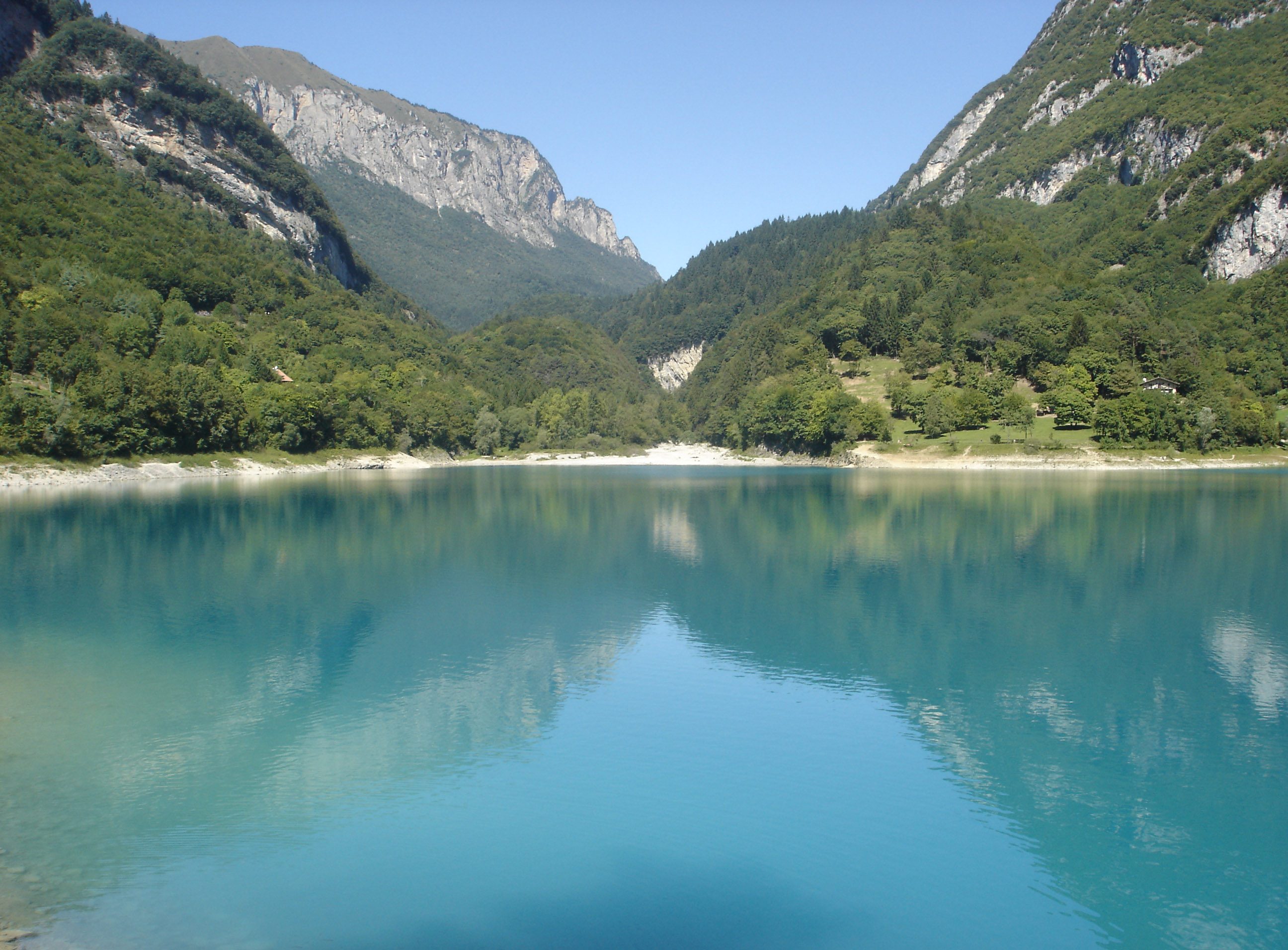

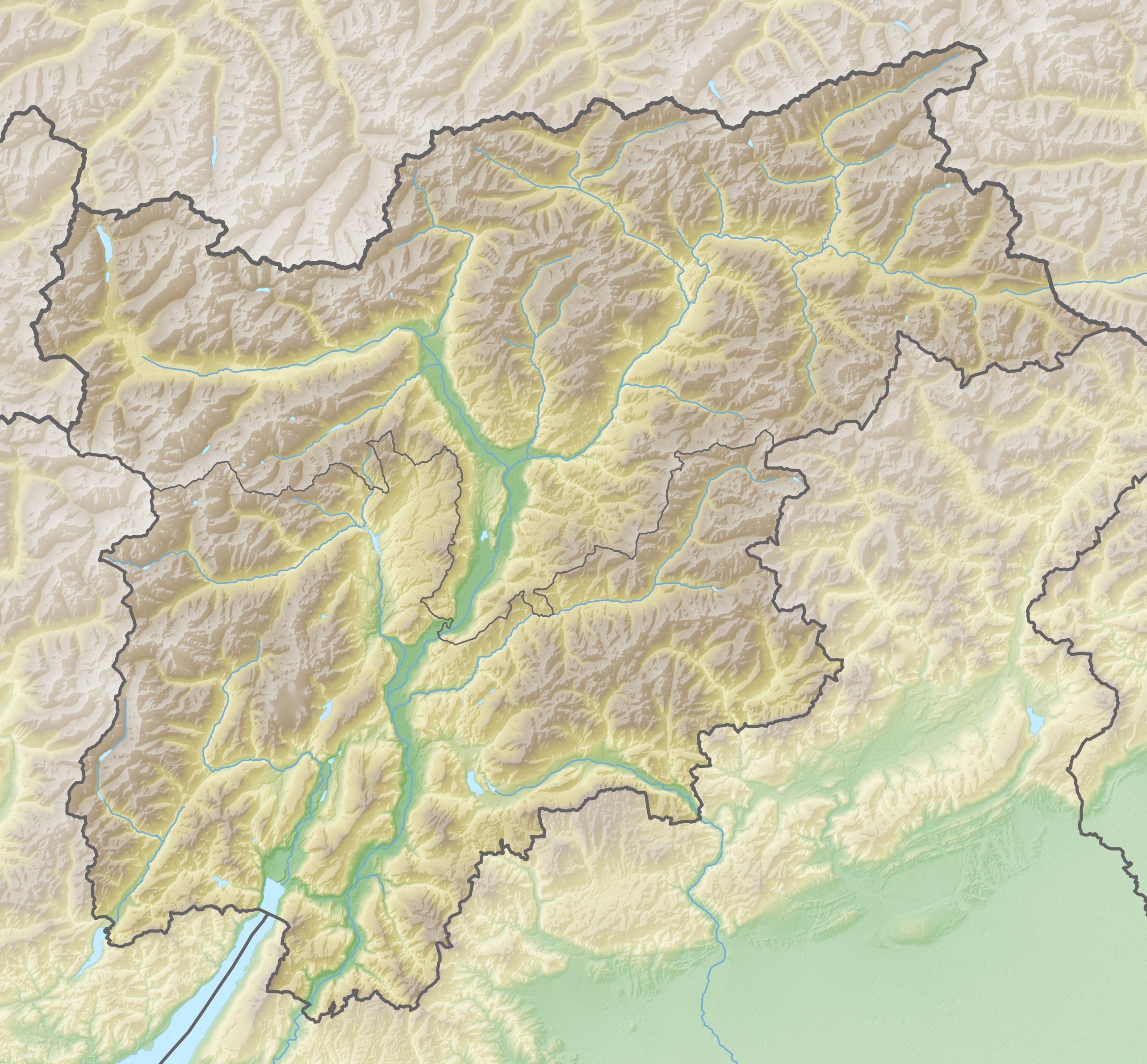
- Location within Trentino-Alto Adige/Südtirol
- Location: Tenno, Trentino
- Coordinates: 45°56′17″N 10°48′57″E
- Primary inflows: Rì Sec, Laurino (locally called Laurel)
- Primary outflows: Picinino
- Basin countries: Italy
- Surface area: 0.25 km^{2} (0.097 sq mi)
- Surface elevation: 570 m (1,870 ft)

Lago di Tenno is a lake at Tenno in Trentino, Italy. At an elevation of 570 m, its surface area is 0.25 km^{2}. The lake was formed around the year 1100 following a large landslide that blocked the course of the river Rì Sec, which is currently the main tributary of the lake. In the southern portion of the lake, there is a small island. The level of the lake varies over the years depending on the flow rate of the tributaries. In the years when the water level is low this island becomes a promontory. This area is protected as a biotope by the Autonomous Province of Trento .
