= Peace Trail (hiking trail) =

Hiking trail in northern Italy

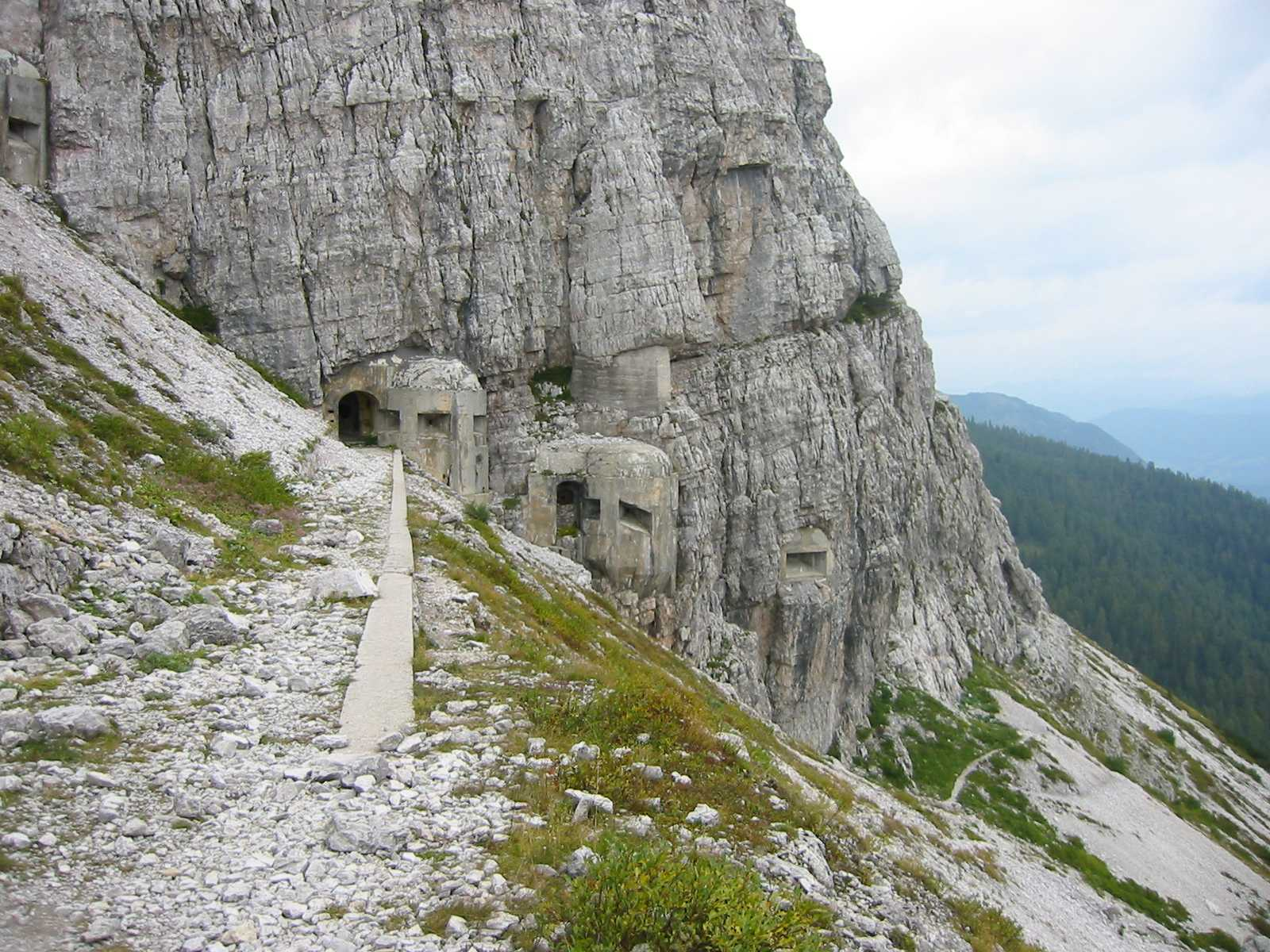
- Military installations at the Dolomites
- Length: 500 km (310 mi)
- Location: South Tirol
- Use: Hiking, Mountain-Bike
- Highest point: Marmolada
- Lowest point: Kaltern an der Weinstraße
- Difficulty: Moderate to Strenuous
- Season: parts year-round

The Peace Trail, or Peace Pathway (Italian: Sentiero della Pace) is an Alpine hiking trail in the South-Tyrolian and Veneto Dolomites of northern Italy. It follows former military trails of World War I southern front and is one of the most important alpine long-distance hiking trails in Italy.

The Peace Trail partially overlaps with other Domitian alpine hiking trails and reaches a total length of about 500 km. It starts in the Sextenian Dolomites, passes along the Swiss border at the Stelvio Pass and descents into the Etsch Valley close to Trento. The higher-most parts lie above the 3000 m limit.

== History ==
Between 1915 and 1917 heavy fights took place in the high Alpine areas of the Dolomites between Italian and Austrian-German forces. Many of the military installations of that time are still visible today, fortifications, loopholes in rocks, rusty remnants of grenades. After decades of abandonment, the military trails started to decay and become impassable.

The idea to preserve the old military trails and installations as part of a reconciliation project between Tyrol and Italy started soon after the Gruber–De Gasperi Agreement (1946). The agreement intended to lead to more autonomy for South Tyrol, which had been separated from Austria in 1919.

Today the trail is a popular destination for hikers, mountain-bikers and other tourists.
