= Monte Baldo =

Mountain in Italy; in Germany named Bubeskopf

- Waldberg
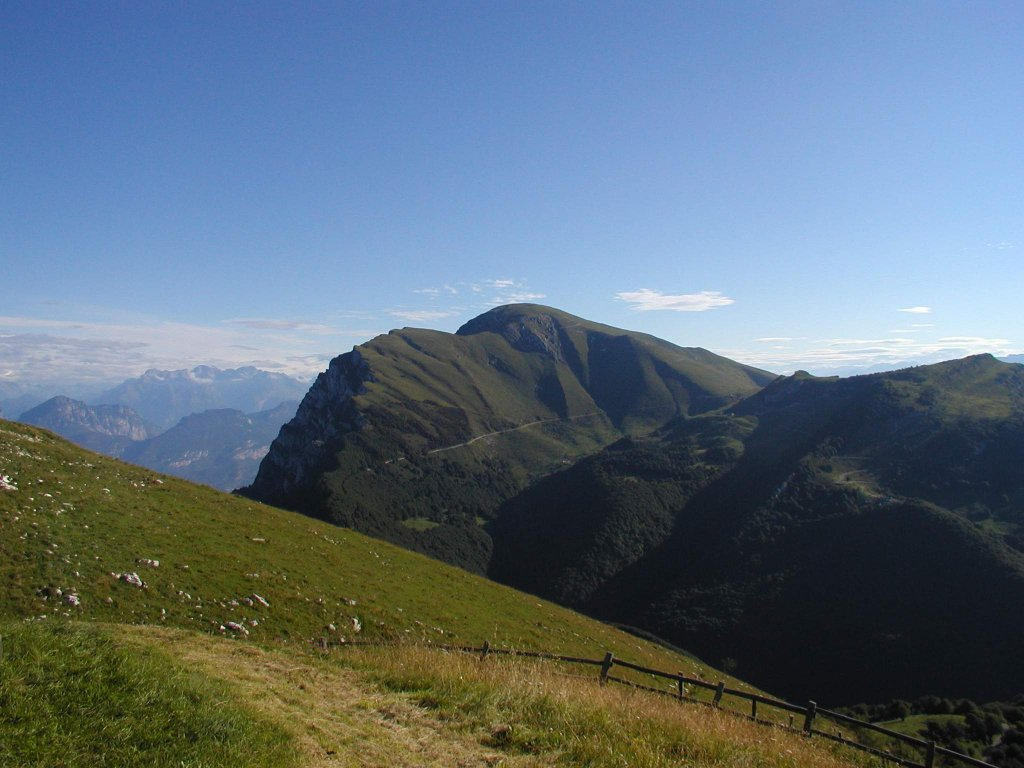
- Monte Altissimo di Nago in the Monte Baldo range

Highest point
- Elevation: 2,218 m (7,277 ft)
- Prominence: 1,950 m (6,400 ft)
- Listing: Ultra
- Coordinates: 45°43′35″N 10°50′38″E

Geography
- Location within Italy
- Location: Veneto, northern Italy
- Parent range: Alps, Brescia and Garda Prealps

Climbing
- Easiest route: rock/snow climb

Monte Baldo (German: Waldberg) is a mountain range in the Italian Alps, located in the provinces of Trento and Verona. Its ridge is oriented in a northeast-southwest direction and it is bounded to the south by the highland ending at Caprino Veronese, to the west by Lake Garda, to the north by the valley joining Rovereto to Nago-Torbole and, to the east, the Val d'Adige.

The name derives from the German Wald ("forest"); it appears for the first time in a German map in 1163. The Peace Trail (it: Sentiero della Pace), one of the most important long distance trails in Northern Italy, leads over the range. The ridge is reachable through a cable car from the nearby town of Malcesine, on the shore of Lake Garda.

== Morphology ==
Mount Baldo is characterized by a geographical identity, a ridge parallel to Lake Garda, which stretches for 40 kilometres (25 miles), between the lake to the west and Val d'Adige to the east, and on the south it is bounded by plain Caprino and North Valley Loppio. Mount Baldo reaches its maximum elevation of 2,218 m with the Cima Valdritta, and its minimum elevation of 65 m on Lake Garda. Other prominent peaks in the range are Monte Altissimo di Nago (2,079 m), Cima del Longino (2,180 m), Cima delle Pozzette (2,132 m) and Punta Telegrafo (2,200 m).

== See also ==
- List of Alpine peaks by prominence

== Images ==
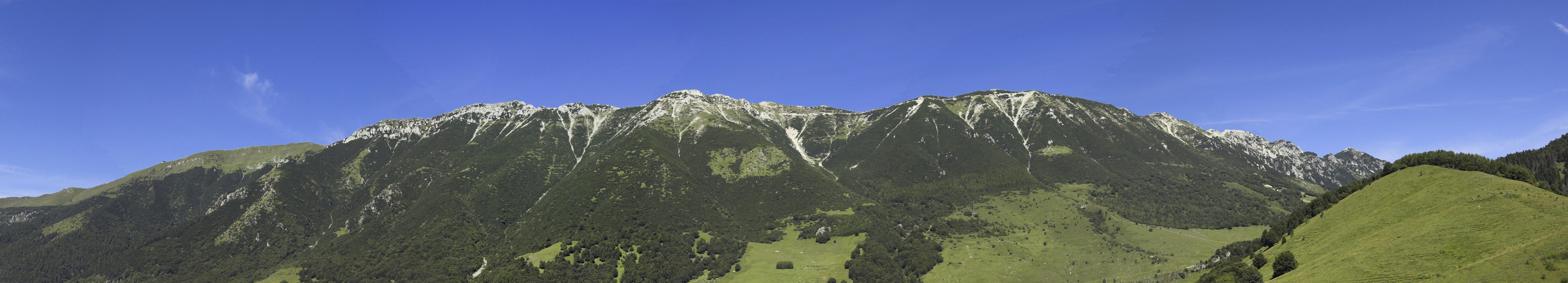
Panorama of Monte Baldo viewed from the west
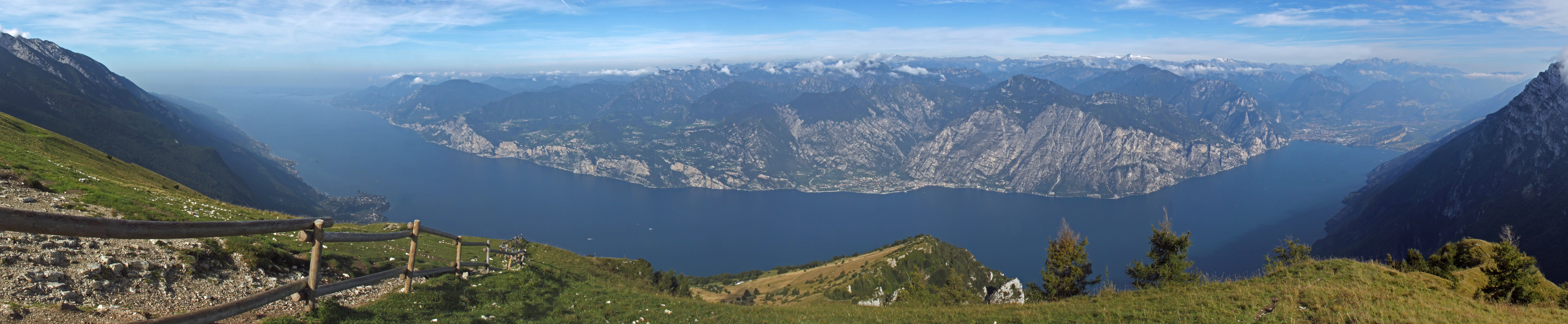
Panoramic view from Monte Baldo looking west to Lake Garda
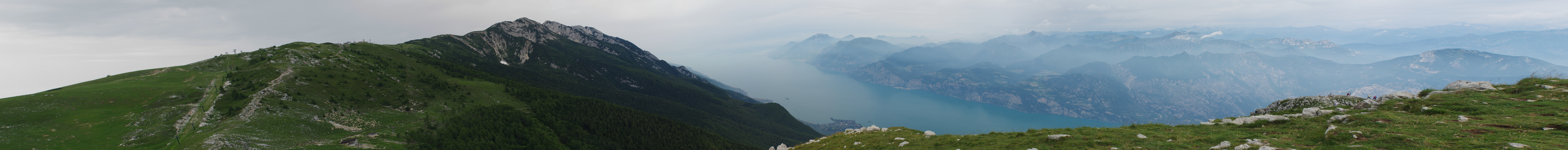
Landscapes on Monte Baldo looking west to Lake Garda
