= Scaligero Castle =

Scaligero Castle or Castello Scaligero may refer to:

- Scaligero Castle (Sirmione), near Sirmione, Lombardy, Italy
- Castello Scaligero (Malcesine), Malcesine, Verona, Italy
