= Sirmio =

Promontory at Lake Garda

Sirmio is a promontory at the southern end of Lake Garda, projecting 3.3 kilometers (2.1 mi) into the lake. It is celebrated in connection with the Roman poet Catullus, as the large ruins of a Roman villa known as the Grottoes of Catullus on the promontory have been supposed to be his country house. Catullus, upon his return home from a long voyage, joyously describes Sirmio as Paene insularum, Sirmio, insularumque ocelle ("Sirmio, jewel of peninsulas and of islands") in his Carmen XXXI, Ad Sirmium insulam. A post station bearing the name Sirmio stood on the highroad between Brixia (modern Brescia) and Verona, near the southern shore of the lake. On the shore below is the village of Sirmione, with sulfur baths.

In 1880, the poet Alfred, Lord Tennyson visited what he called "Sweet Catullus's all-but-island, olive-silvery Sirmio" in his poem "Frater Ave Atque Vale", the title referring to the last line of a famous elegy of Catullus, on the death of his brother.
