= Benedetta Bianchi Porro =

Italian Roman Catholic (1936–1964)

Blessed Benedetta Bianchi Porro
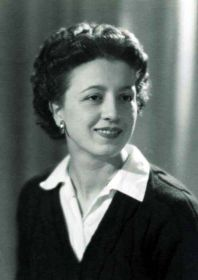

Virgin
- Born: 8 August 1936; Dovadola, Forlì, Kingdom of Italy
- Died: 23 January 1964 (aged 27); Sirmione, Brescia, Italy
- Resting place: Chiesa di Sant'Andrea, Italy
- Venerated in: Roman Catholic Church
- Beatified: 14 September 2019, Forlì, Italy by Cardinal Giovanni Angelo Becciu
- Feast: 23 January

Benedetta Bianchi Porro (8 August 1936 – 23 January 1964) was an Italian Roman Catholic from Romagna. In her teenage years, she contracted polio, which greatly impacted her health. Nevertheless, Porro endeavored to pursue a career in medicine, distinguishing herself as an exceptional student. However, the aggressive progression of her illness ultimately forced her to relinquish her medical ambitions. In a bid to improve her health, she underwent multiple surgeries, but these interventions failed to alleviate her health problems, leading to a rapid deterioration of her health.

She was proclaimed Venerable on 23 December 1993 on the account of her good deeds and model life. Pope Francis confirmed a miracle attributed to her intercession in a decree on 7 November 2018; she was beatified on 14 September 2019.

== Life ==
Benedetta Bianchi Porro was born at Dovadola as the second of six children to Guido Bianchi Porro and Elsa Giammarchi. Her siblings were Gabriele (b. 1938), Manuela (b. 1941), Corrado (b. 1946) and Carmen (b. 1953); her half-sister was Leonida (b. 1930). She was baptized "in necessity" at the request of her mother with water from Lourdes; she received formal baptism on the following 13 August in the name of "Benedetta Bianca Maria". Three months after her birth she fell ill with polio and required a brace on her left leg and an orthopedic shoe in order to prevent her spine from deforming; Doctor Vittorio Putti from Bologna diagnosed her illness. From March to May 1937 she was hit with repeated bronchitis.

From the age of five she began to keep a journal in which to record experiences; one such entry was at the age of seven: "The universe is enchanting! It is great to be alive!" Porro attended grammar school in Desenzano that the Ursulines managed. Her secondary schooling was also overseen by the Ursulines in Brescia in the Istituto Santa Maria degli Angeli. Porro always was homesick while away at school. In 1942, the family moved to Sirmione.

During her childhood on one particular occasion, her brother Gabriele was involved in a brawl with a boy who mockingly called Porro a cripple, and while the mothers of both boys separated them both, she said: "He called me 'the cripple' – what is wrong with that? It's the truth!"

In May 1944 she received her First Communion in the Church of the Annunciation where she received a rosary that she would always keep with her. She later received Confirmation a fortnight later from the Bishop of Modigliana Maximilian Massimiliani. For the 1950 Holy Year convoked by Pope Pius XII, she and her aunt Carmen travelled on pilgrimages to Assisi, Rome and Loreto. She enjoyed reading and she preferred Tolstoy since she liked Russian literature, and also liked Horace and William Shakespeare.

At the age of thirteen she began to lose her hearing and began to notice this on 15 February 1953 when questioned by a teacher in Latin class; she was unable to hear all the questions put to her. Porro also began to stagger and required the use of a cane in order to walk more easily.

In October 1953 – at the age of seventeen — she travelled to Milan where she went to enroll in a physics course in order to appease her father, but she instead discovered that her true calling was to medicine; she also realized that her vocation was to engage with others as a doctor to help those who needed aid the most. Some of her teachers opposed having a pre-medical student who was partially deaf, but she proved to be a brilliant student. On 26 April 1955 she asked for permission to do her biochemistry and microbiology examinations, and received that permission to do so not long after; her human anatomy examinations were done well, with a result of 23 out of 30. Her illness progressed to the point where she was admitted into a nursing home on 12 July 1955 for a femur condition and for the subsequent rehabilitation. On the following 26 October, she asked for permission to enroll in clinical medicine and pathology courses. In November 1955, she was permitted to retake an oral examination from the previous summer, but she did so in writing instead and passed with excellent results.

In 1957 her studies reached the point where she could diagnose herself: it was soon discovered that she had fallen victim to the rare Von Recklinghausen's disease, which would leave her blind and deaf. Due to her illness, she was forced to leave medical school. Confined to her home, she began to evangelize to others through correspondences to others in which she discussed faith and love of God. Friends from medical school visited her on a frequent basis.

Her first operation in 1958 caused partial paralysis on the left side of her face; a second operation in August 1959 left her completely paralyzed and reliant on a wheelchair. she also began to lose the five senses on a gradual level.

In May 1962 she undertook a pilgrimage to Lourdes seeking a miracle for her ailments. There, she met 22-year-old Maria who was sobbing beside her. Porro took her hand and urged her to beseech the Blessed Virgin Mary for her intercession, at which point Maria was healed. Porro went back on 24 June 1963 where she discovered that her ailments would increase and that she would die of them.

She underwent several operations on her head and confided her fear of such operations on 27 February 1963; the last left her blind as well as rendering her immobile save for moving her right hand, and she could barely speak. The number of people who visited her increased steadily as word of her holiness and gentle understanding of love of God spread.

Her health took a dramatic decline after her pilgrimage to Lourdes, and on the night of 22 January 1964 said to her nurse: "Emilia, tomorrow I will die. I feel very ill". Porro died in the morning of 23 January 1964 after receiving Communion and Reconciliation, and was buried in the cemetery of Sirmione; her remains were later transferred to the Church of Saint Andrew in Dovádola.

== Beatification ==
The process for beatification was approved on 12 July 1975 which bestowed Porro with the title Servant of God. This signified the beginning of the first phase of the beatification proceedings; the process spanned from 25 January 1976 and 9 July 1977. The Congregation for the Causes of Saints decreed the process was valid and allowed for the opening of the so-called "Roman Phase" on 5 June 1981.

Pope John Paul II declared her to be Venerable on 23 December 1993 on the account of her model life based on exercising heroic virtue to a high degree.

The miracle needed for her beatification was investigated and was declared valid on 20 June 2014 in order for its evaluation to take place in Rome. It was reported that the beatification could have taken place in 2017 since the miracle requires the approval of the Congregation for the Causes of Saints and the pope. Pope Francis confirmed the miracle attributed to her intercession in a decree issued on 7 November 2018; she was beatified on 14 September 2019. The current postulator of the cause is Father Guglielmo Camera.
