= Sirmione =

Sirmione Sirmiù (Lombard) Sirmion (Venetian)
- Comune
- Comune di Sirmione
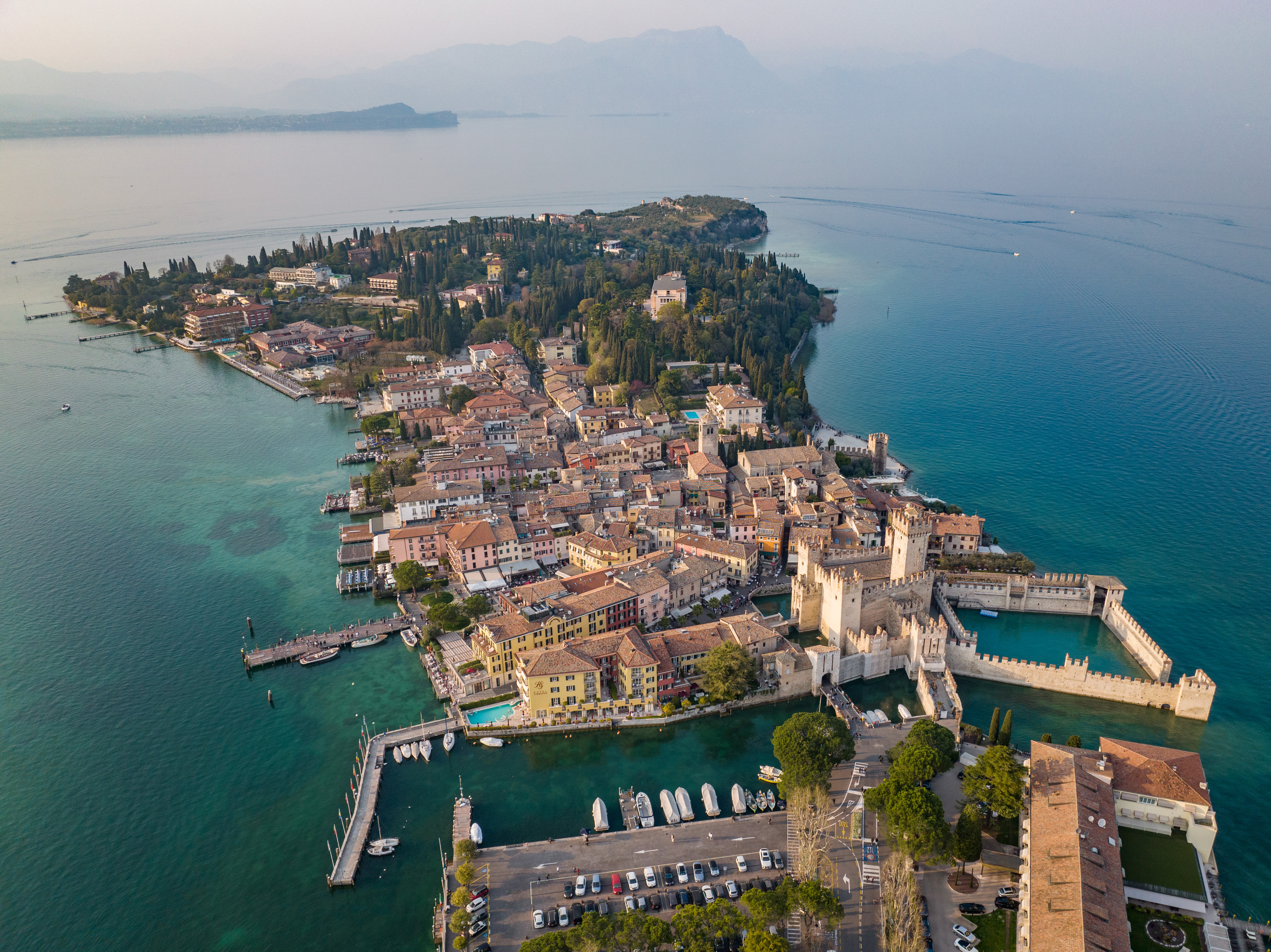
- View of Sirmione

- Coat of arms

- Location within Italy Location within Lombardy
- Coordinates: 45°29′33″N 10°36′30″E
- Country: Italy
- Region: Lombardy
- Province: Brescia (BS)
- Frazioni: Colombare di Sirmione, Lugana, Rovizza

Government
  - Mayor: Luisa Lavelli (FI)

Area
  - Total: 33 km^{2} (13 sq mi)
- Elevation: 68 m (223 ft)

Population (2011)
  - Total: 8,230
  - Density: 250/km^{2} (650/sq mi)
- Demonym: Sirmionesi
- Time zone: UTC+1 (CET)
  - Summer (DST): UTC+2 (CEST)
- Postal code: 25019, 25010
- Dialing code: 030
- Website: Official website

Sirmione (Brescian: Sirmiù; Venetian: Sirmion) is a comune in the province of Brescia, in Lombardy in northern Italy. It is bounded by Desenzano del Garda (Lombardy) and Peschiera del Garda in the province of Verona and the region of Veneto. It has a historical centre which is located on the Sirmio peninsula that divides the lower part of Lake Garda.

== History ==
Map showing Sirmione in the Province of Brescia.

The first traces of human presence in the area of Sirmione date from the 6th–5th millennia BC. Settlements on palafitte existed in the 3rd and 2nd millennia BC.

Starting from the 1st century BC, the area of the Garda, including what is now Sirmione, became a favourite resort for rich families coming from Verona, then the main Roman city in north-eastern Italy. The poet Catullus praised the beauties of the city and spoke of a villa he had in the area.

In the late Roman era (4th–5th centuries AD) the city became a fortified strongpoint defending the southern shore of the lake. A settlement existed also after the Lombard conquest of northern Italy: in the late years of the Lombard kingdom, the city was capital of a judiciary district directly subordinated to the king. Ansa, wife of King Desiderius, founded a monastery and a church in the city.

Around the year 1000, Sirmione was probably a free comune, but fell into the hands of the Scaliger in the early 13th century. Mastino I della Scala was probably the founder of the castle. In the same period, Sirmione was refuge for Patarines hereticals. The military role of the city continued until the 16th century, but a garrison remained in the castle until the 19th century.

Sirmione was a possession of the Venetian Republic from 1405 until 1797, when it was acquired by the Habsburg Empire. It became part of the Kingdom of Italy in 1860.

== Main sights ==
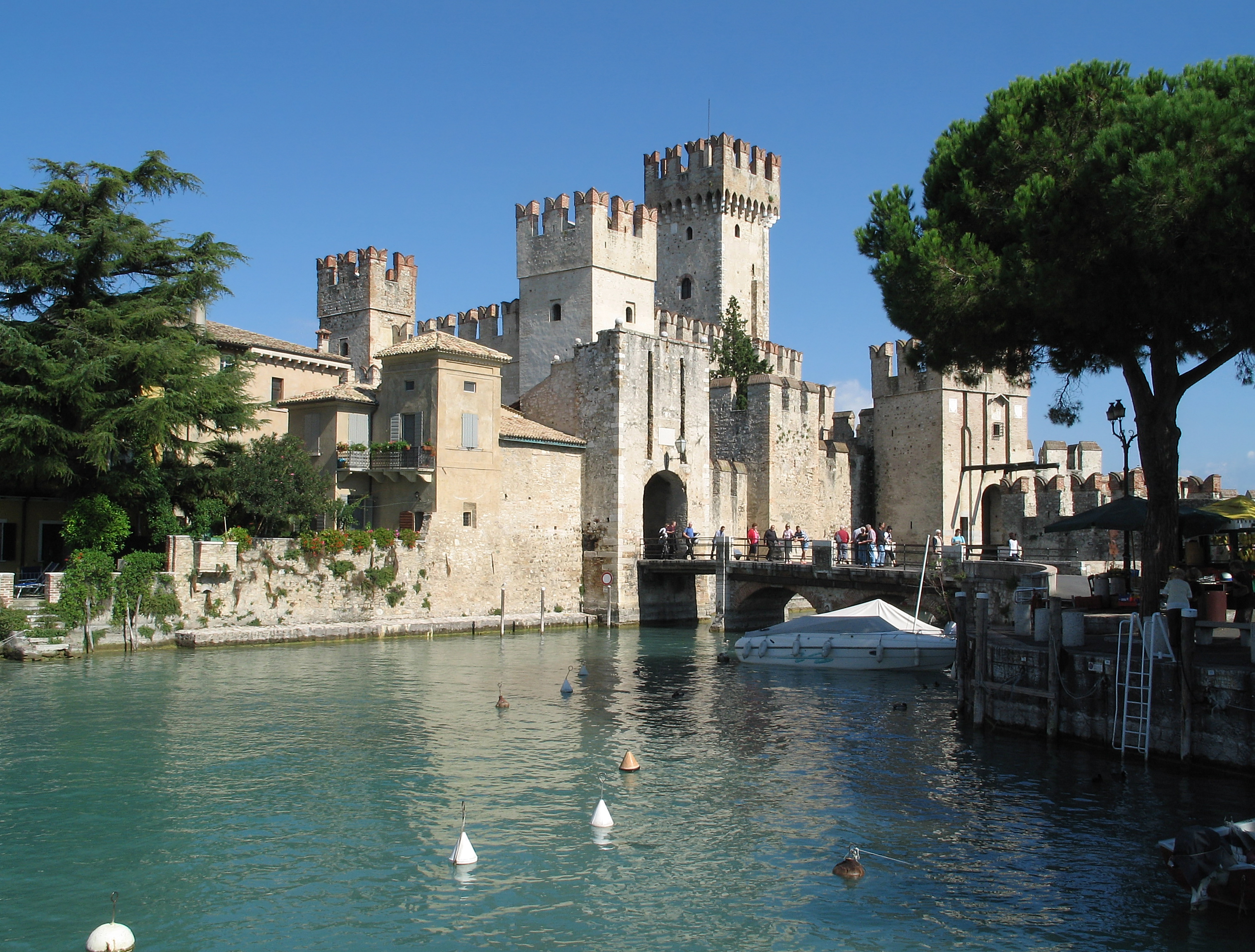
Sirmione Castle

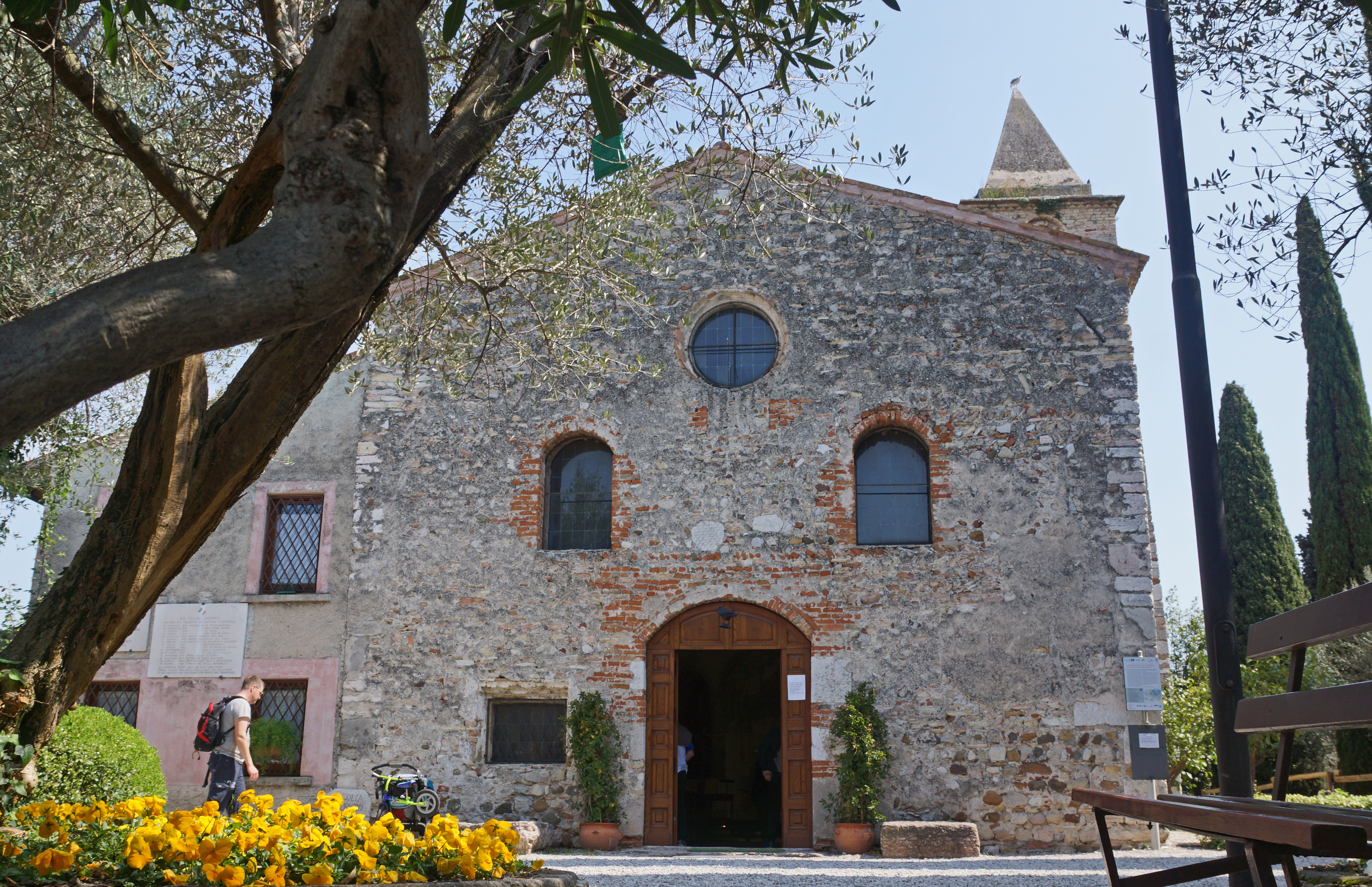
San Pietro in Mavino church

- The main historical landmark of Sirmione is the so-called Grottoes of Catullus (Grotte di Catullo), the most striking example of a Roman private edifice discovered in northern Italy. The edifice had a rectangular plan and measured 167 by 105 metres (548 ft × 344 ft).
- The Scaligero Castle (13th century). This is a rare example of medieval port fortification, which was used by the Scaliger fleet. The building of this complex started in 1277 by Mastino I della Scala. It presents the typical Ghibelline swallowtail merlons and the curtain-walls (with three corner towers) in pebbles alternating with two horizontal bands of brick courses. The walls on the inside were finished with plaster with graffiti, simulating blocks of stone. The castle stands at a strategic place at the entrance to the peninsula. It is surrounded by a moat and it can only be entered by two drawbridges. The castle was established mainly as a protection against enemies, but also against the locals. The main room houses a small museum with local finds from the Roman era and a few medieval artifacts.
- The small church of Sant’Anna della Rocca, next to the castle. It dates from the 12th century and was used mainly by the garrison and the few local villagers. The frescoes in the church date from the 14th–17th century.
- The church of San Pietro in Mavino, built in Lombard times (AD 765) but renovated in the early 14th century. At the portal one can see a brick wall with the date 1320. It is secluded from the town and is situated on the hill. The term mavino refers to the Latin phrase in summas vineas (up in the vineyards). The church has a rectangular plan and is oriented east–west. The chancel contains three apses. The one in the middle shows a Christ Pantocrator in Byzantine tradition; the one on the left a Madonna Enthroned; the one on the right a Crucifixion. The ceiling is made of wooden beams. The church contains frescoes from the 12th–16th centuries. The Romanesque bell tower dates from 1070. The church has been used in the past as a military hospital and its surroundings as a cemetery for plague victims.
- The church Santa Maria Maggiore (late 15th century) is located in the town centre. It stands on the site of the former Lombard church of San Martino (second half of the 8th century). It has a rectangular shape with a polygonal apse and is oriented east–west. It has a single nave, divided by three arches. It is decorated with early 15th-century frescoes. The frescoes at the bottom of the north wall even belong to an earlier period. The contemporary wooden statue of the Madonna Enthroned is also of special interest.

== World Heritage Site ==
The prehistoric settlement at Lugana Vecchia is part of the Prehistoric Pile dwellings around the Alps, a UNESCO World Heritage Site.

== Municipal government ==
Sirmione is headed by a mayor (sindaco) assisted by a legislative body, the consiglio comunale, and an executive body, the giunta comunale. Since 1995, the mayor and members of the consiglio comunale are directly elected together by resident citizens, while from 1945 to 1995 the mayor was chosen by the legislative body. The giunta comunale is chaired by the mayor, who appoints others members, called assessori. The offices of the comune are housed in a building usually called the municipio or palazzo comunale.

Since 1995, the mayor of Sirmione is directly elected by citizens, originally every four, then every five years. The current mayor is Luisa Lavelli (FI), who in May 2018 as deputy mayor replaced the former mayor Alessandro Mattinzoli, elected regional councillor. Lavelli was finally elected mayor on 26 May 2019 with the 50.1% of the votes and re-elected on 10 June 2024 with 33% of the votes.

Mayor	Term start	Term end	Party
Mario Arduino	24 April 1995	14 June 1999	PDS
Maurizio Ferrari	14 June 1999	8 June 2009	AN
Alessandro Mattinzoli	8 June 2009	29 May 2018	FI
Luisa Lavelli	29 May 2018	incumbent	FI

== Notable people ==
- The poet Gaius Valerius Catullus (c. 84 - c. 54 BCE) lived in the 1st century BC. His family owned a villa in Sirmione.
- Alfred Tennyson described his impressions of Sirmione in the summer of 1880 in his poem Frater Ave atque Vale. (Note: Row us out from Desenzano, to your Sirmione row! So they row'd, and there we landed-"O venusta Sirmio" There to me through all the groves of olive in the summer glow, There beneath the Roman ruin where the purple flowers grow, Came that 'Ave atque Vale' of the Poet's hopeless woe, Tenderest of Roman poets nineteen-hundred years ago, 'Frater Ave atque Vale' - as we wandered to and fro Gazing at the Lydian laughter of the Garda Lake below Sweet Catullus's all-but-island, olive-silvery Sirmio! — Alfred Tennyson, Frater Ave atque Vale)
- Italian writers who wrote about Sirmione include Giosuè Carducci, Antonio Fogazzaro and Gabriele D'Annunzio.
- Ezra Pound and James Joyce met in the city in 1920.
- Maria Callas had a villa in Sirmione.
- English writer Naomi Jacob lived in Sirmione until her death in 1964. A small plaque in Sirmione commemorates her.
- Blessed Benedetta Bianchi Porro lived in Sirmione, when her family moved in the 1940s, where her father, Guido was in charge of the hot spring aqueducts. She died on 23 January 1964; a small plaque is placed in the town to commemorate her presence, especially that she is now closer to becoming a Saint of the Catholic Church.

== Gallery ==
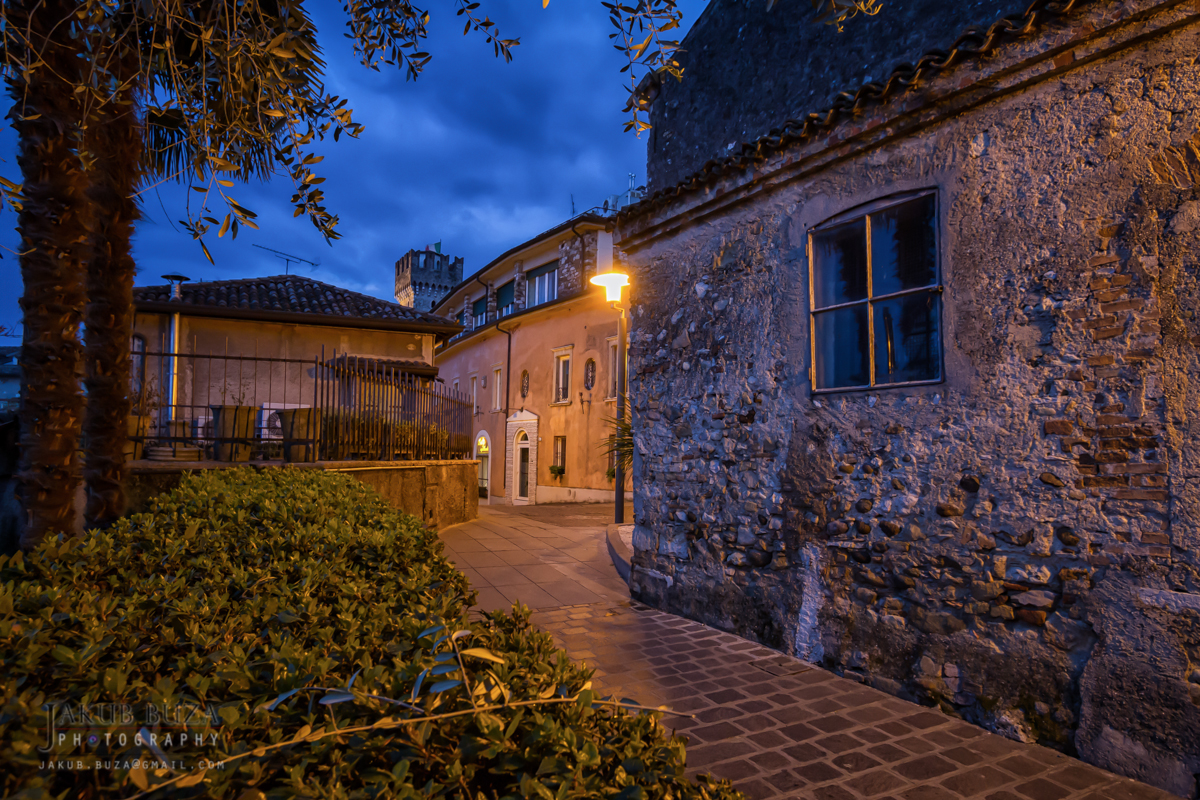
Sirmione old town

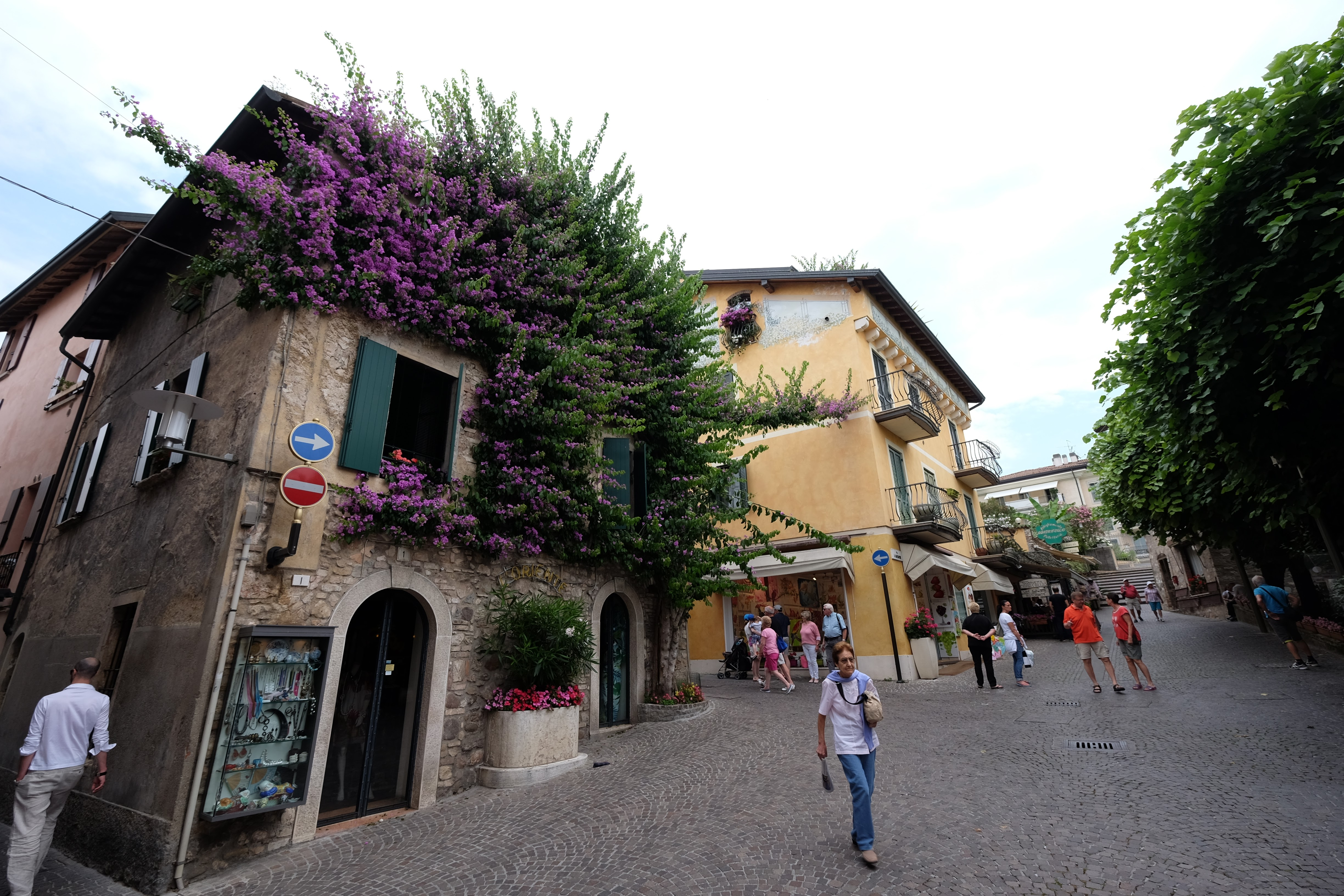
House in the old town

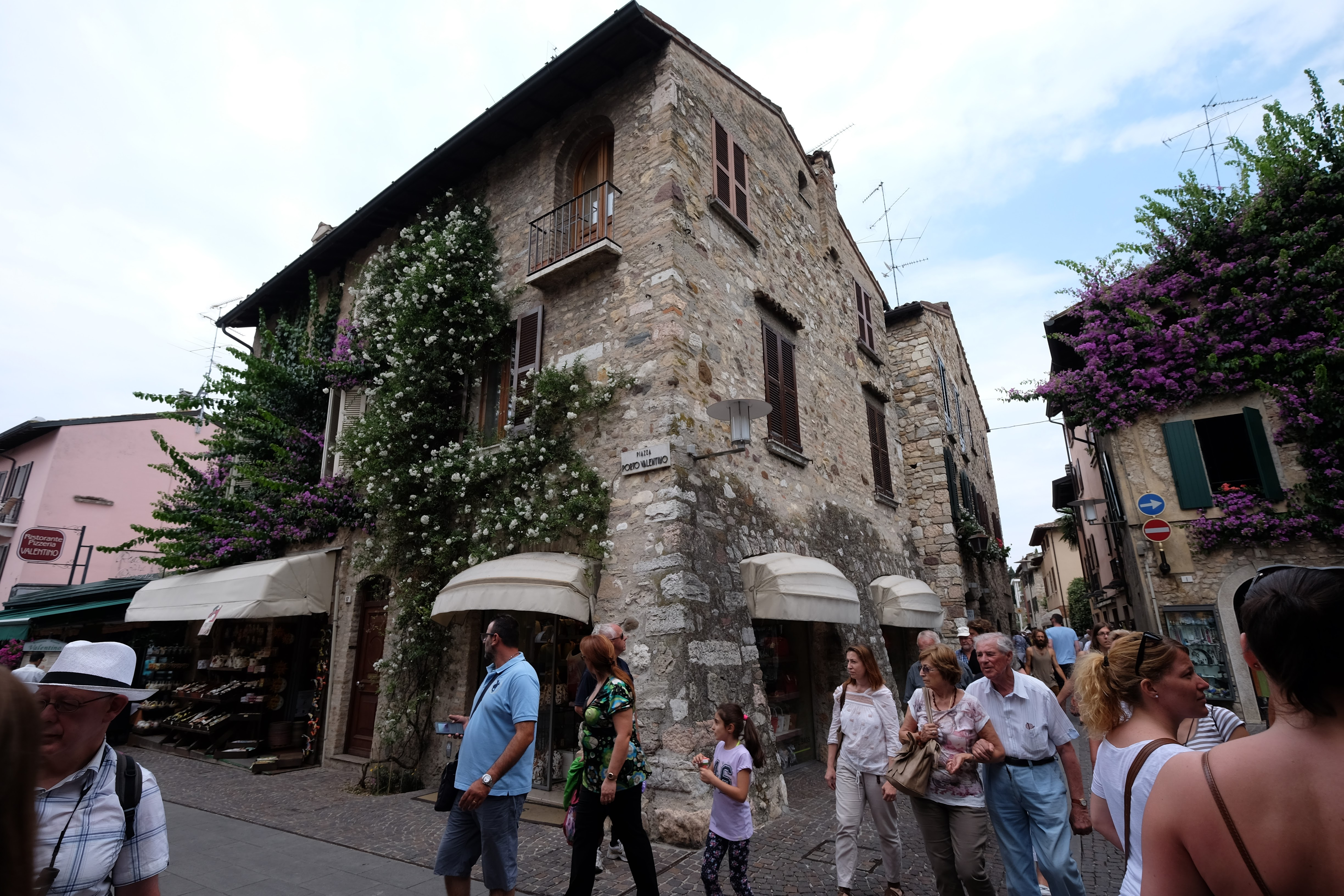
House in the old town

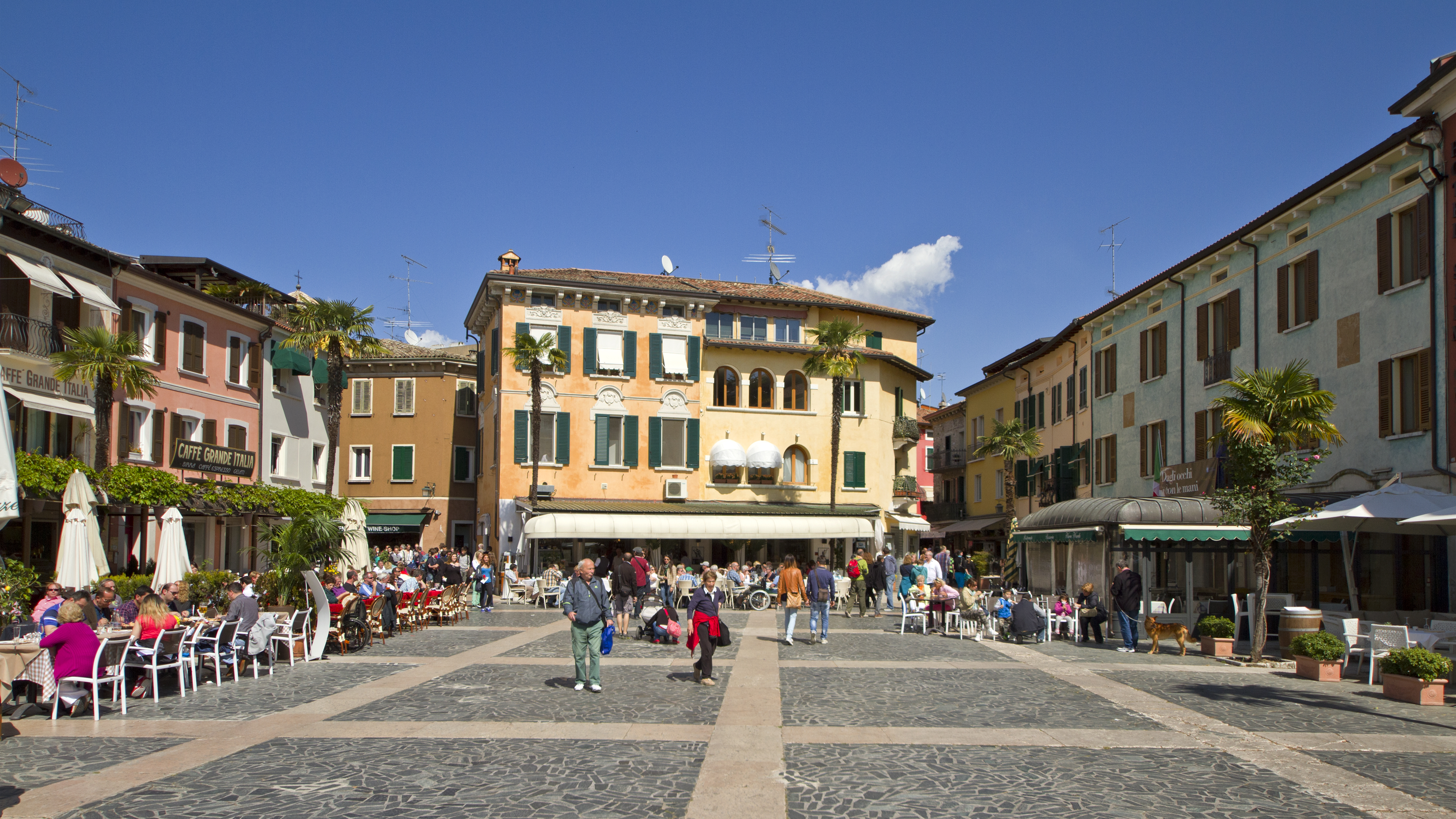
Piazza Carducci is the main square in the old town

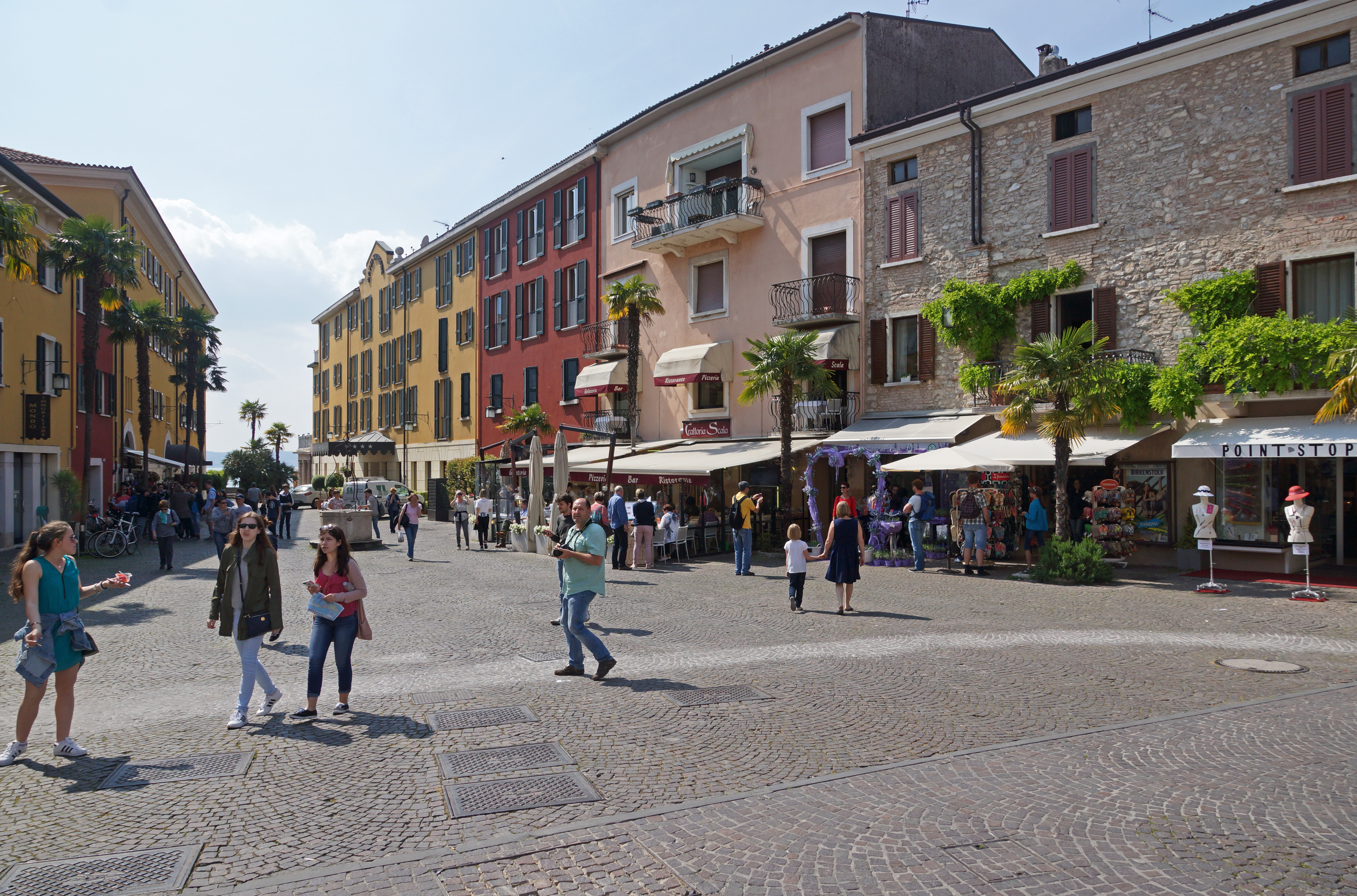
Main street in the old town

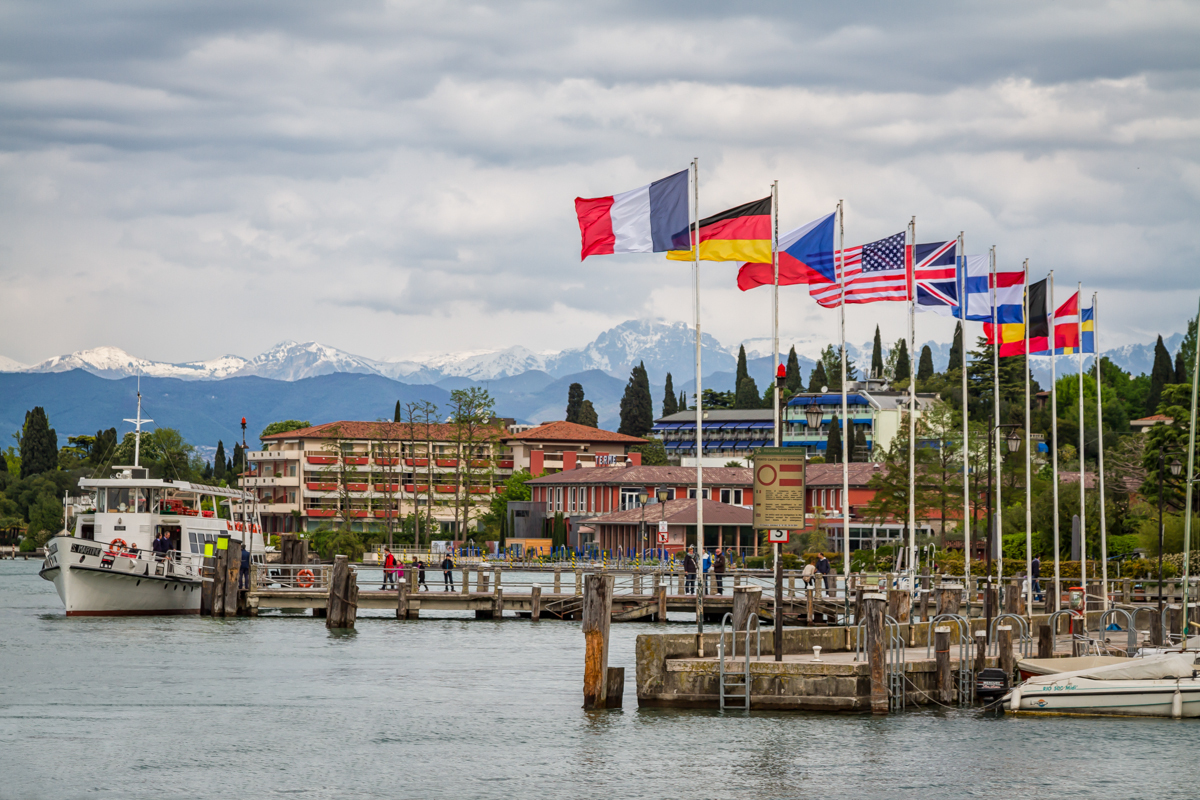
Sirmione harbor with the Alps on the background

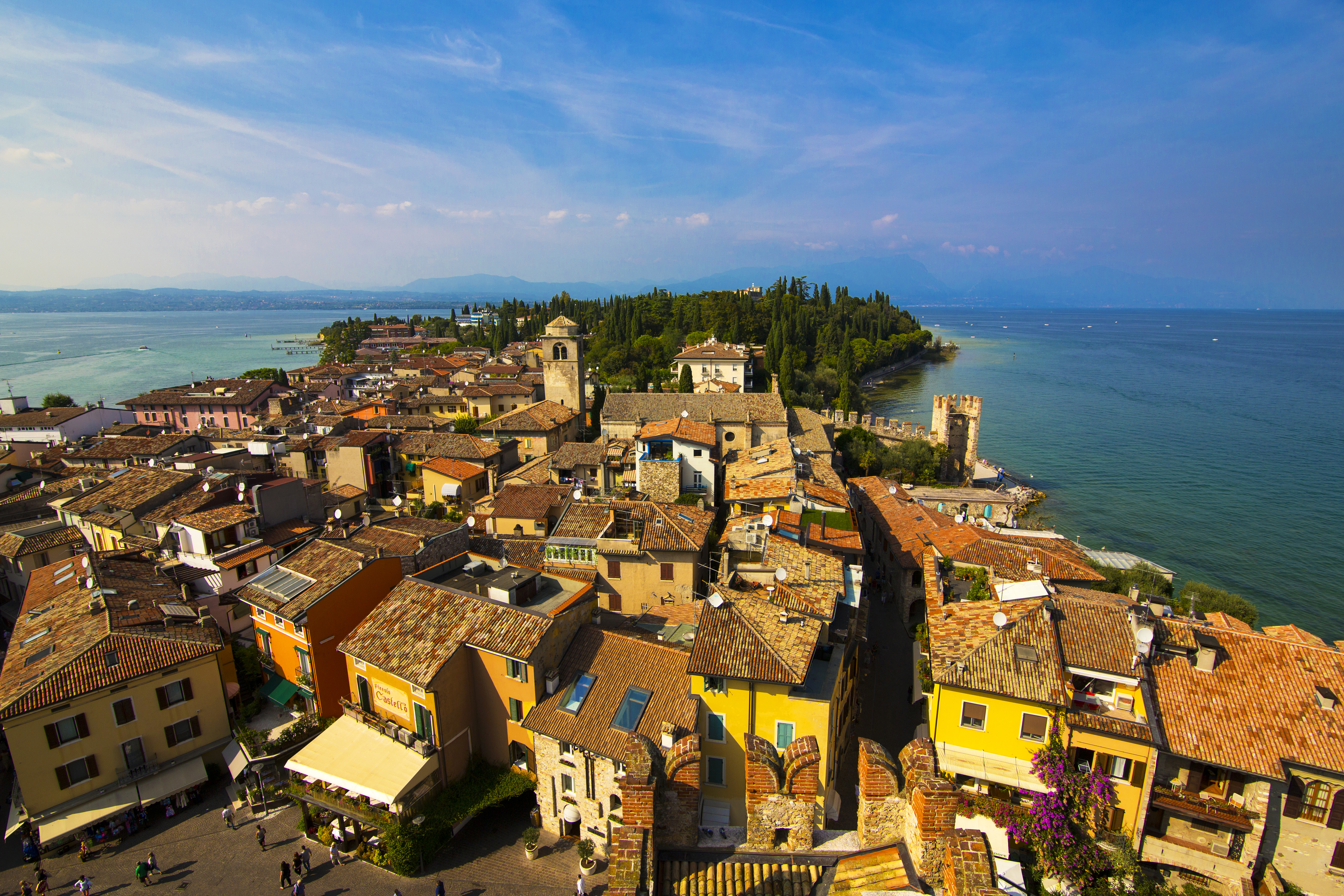
View of Sirmione historical center from the castle

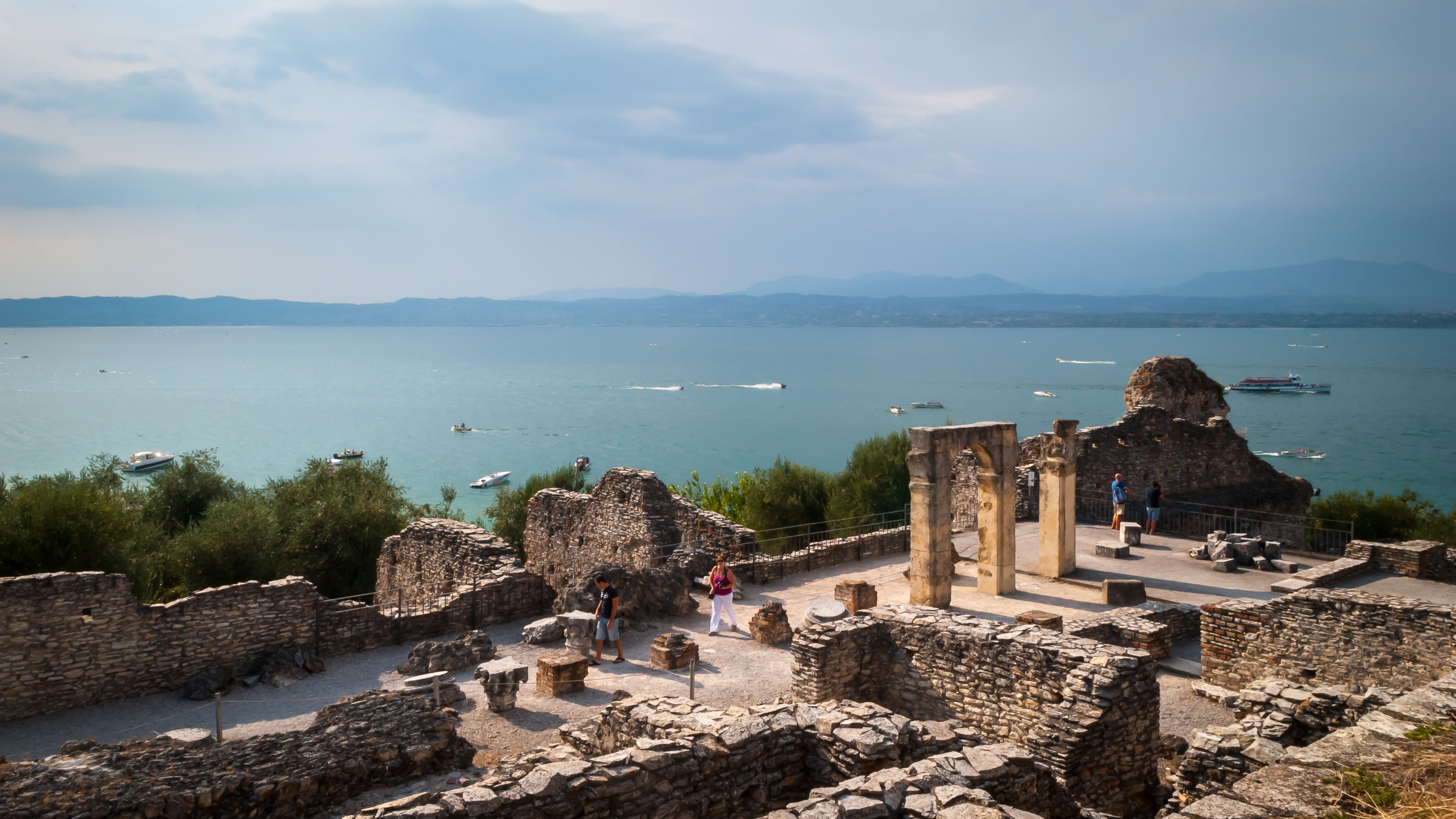
Grottoes of Catullus

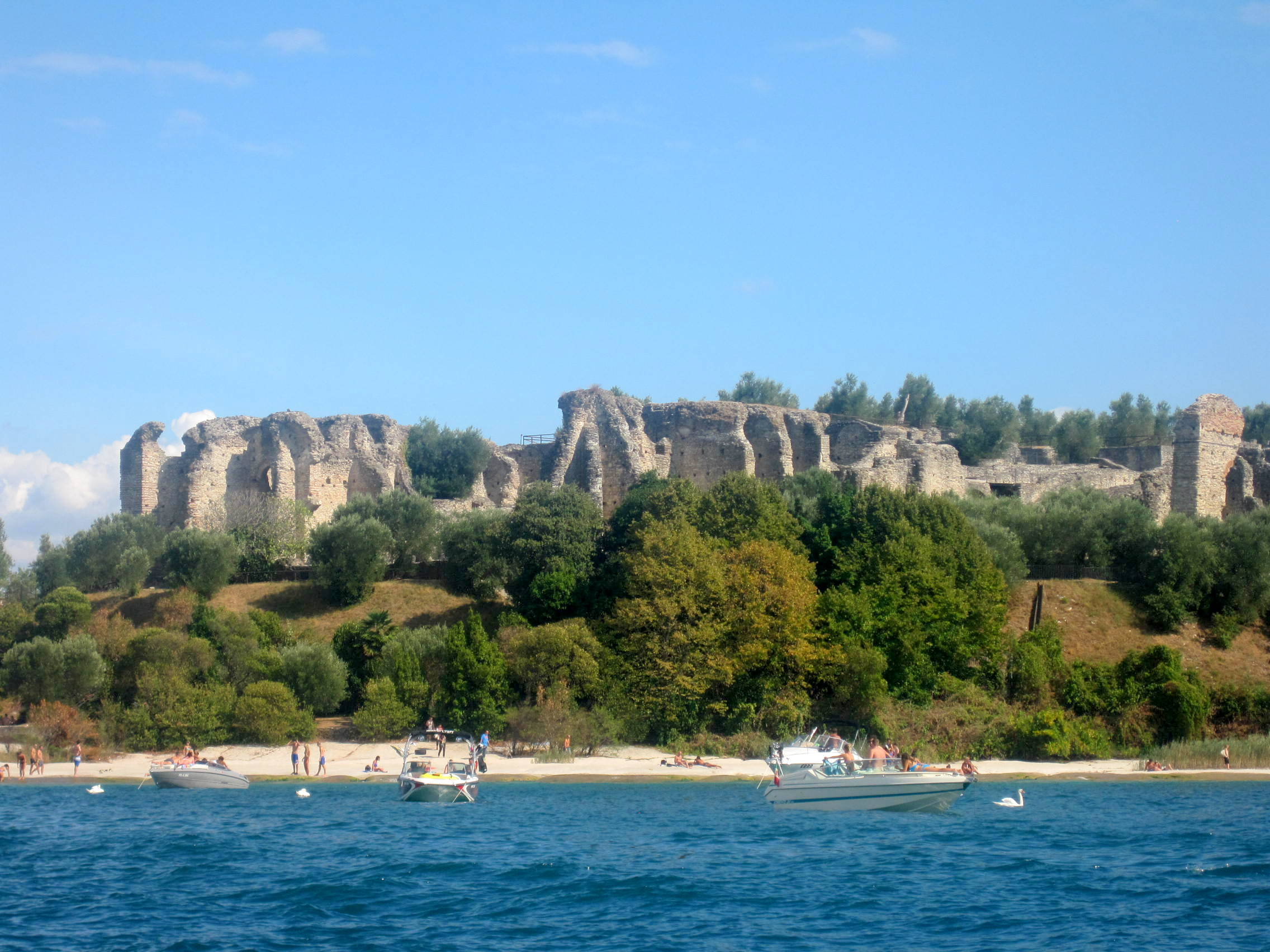
Grottoes of Catullus seen from the lake

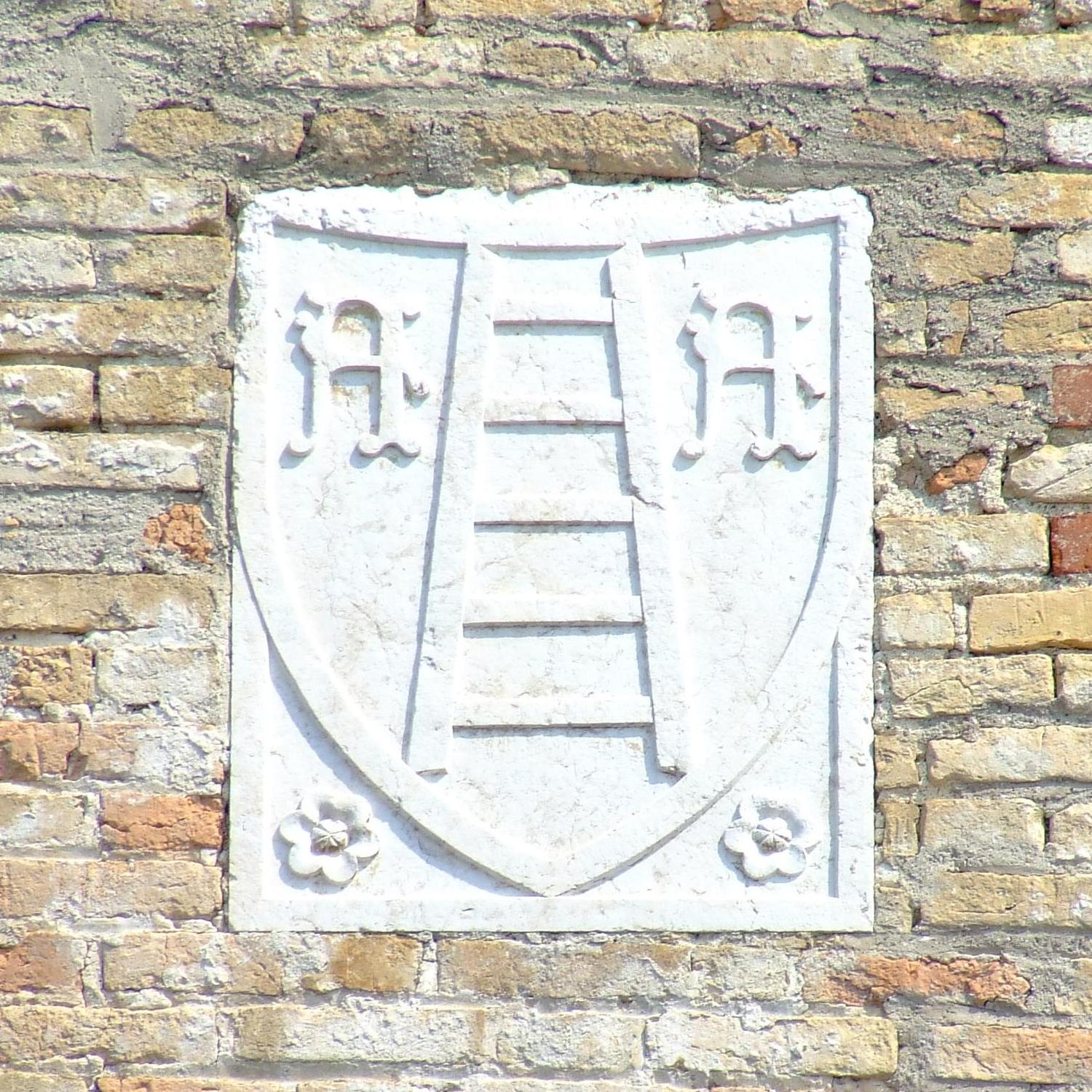
The Scaliger insignia on the Sirmione Castle

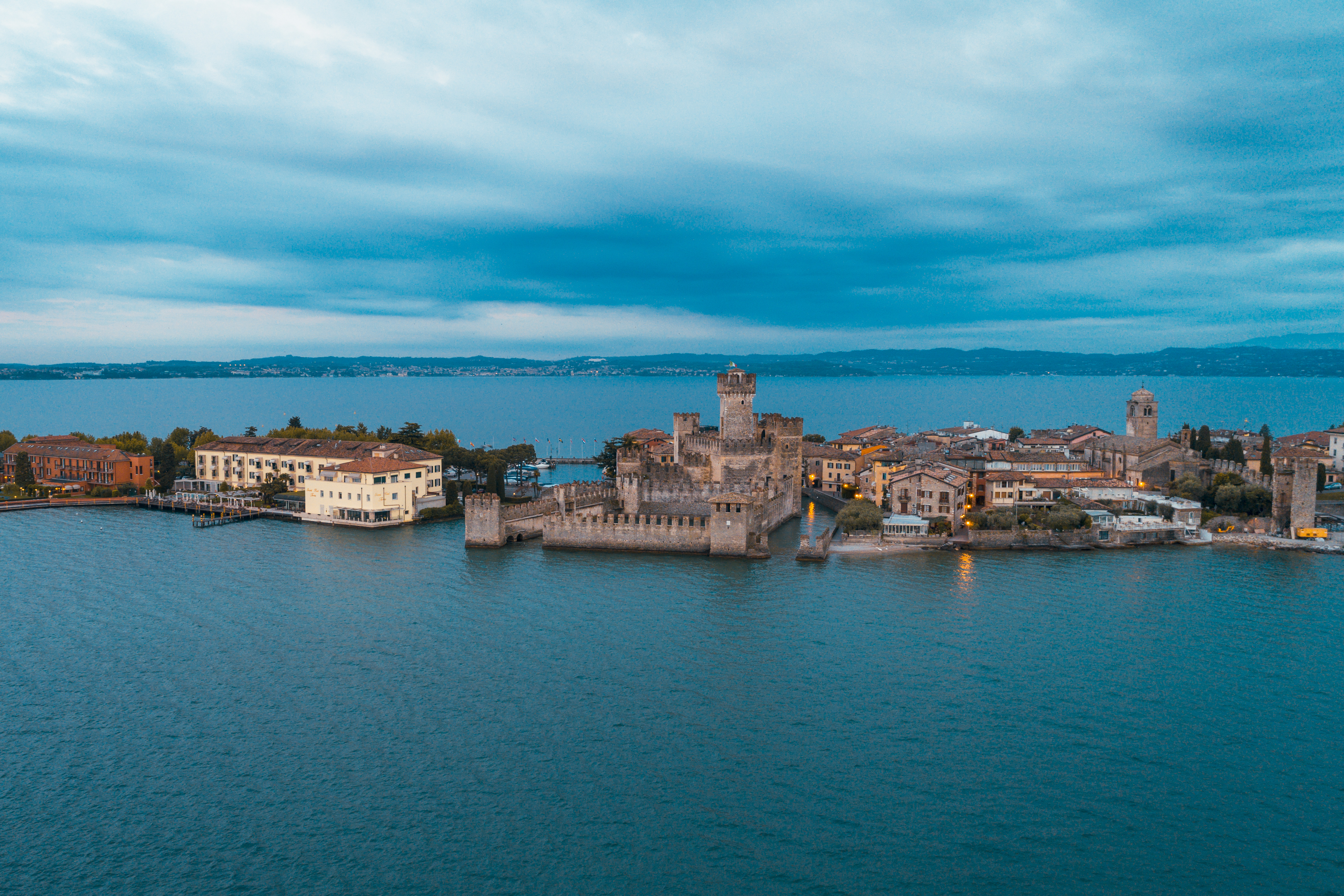
Sirmione seen from the lake

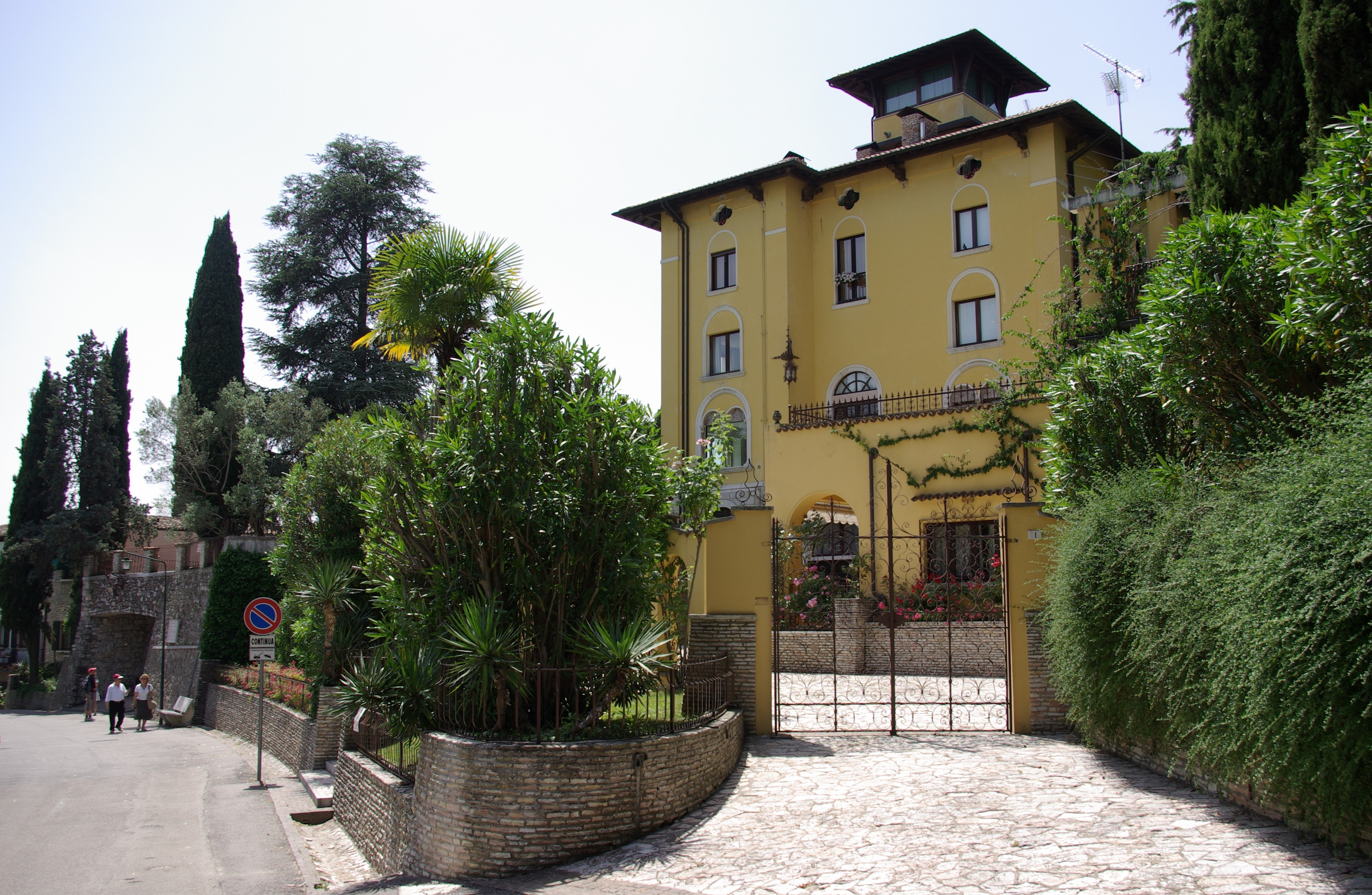
Villa Maria Callas

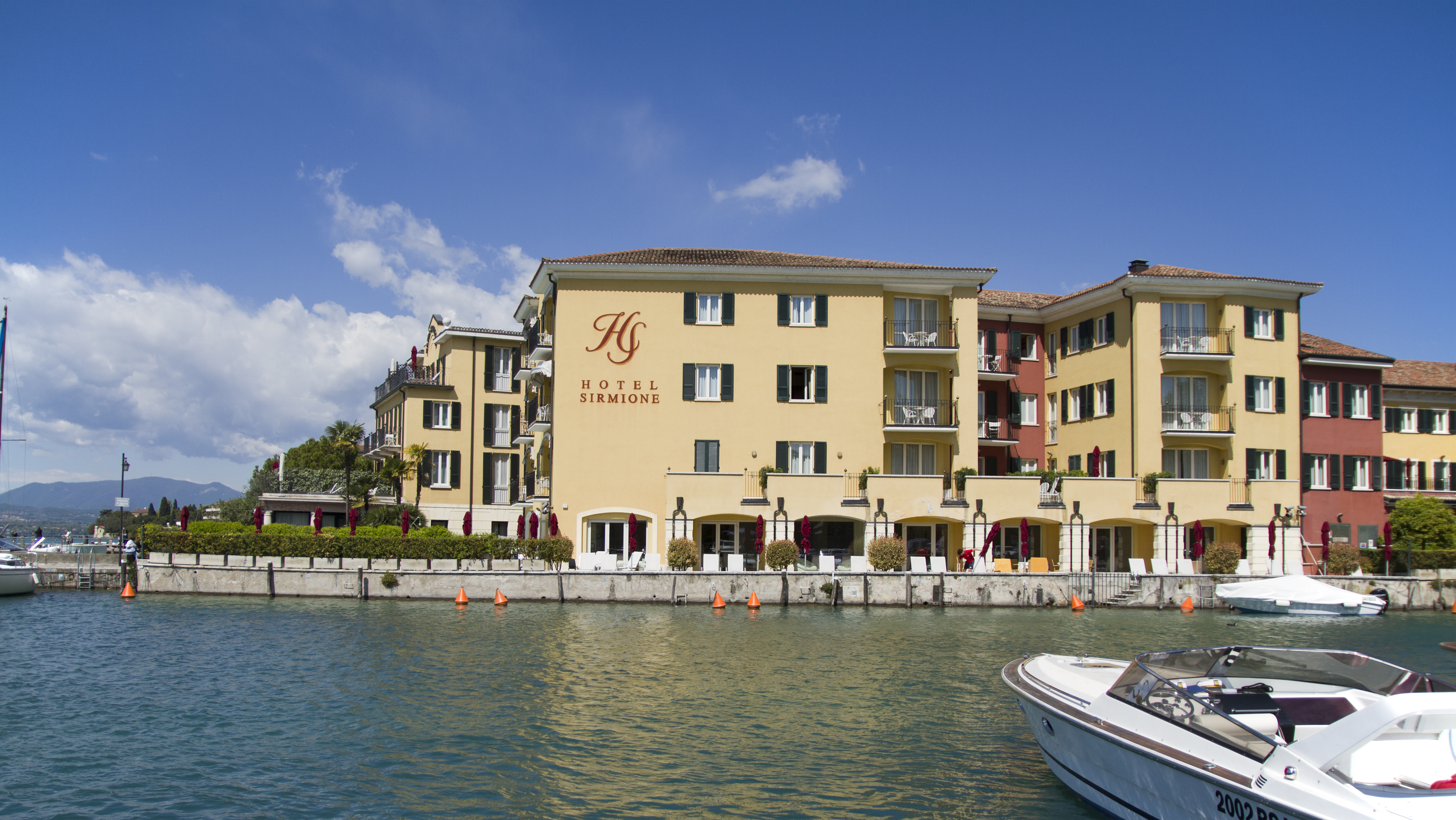
Hotel in Sirmione

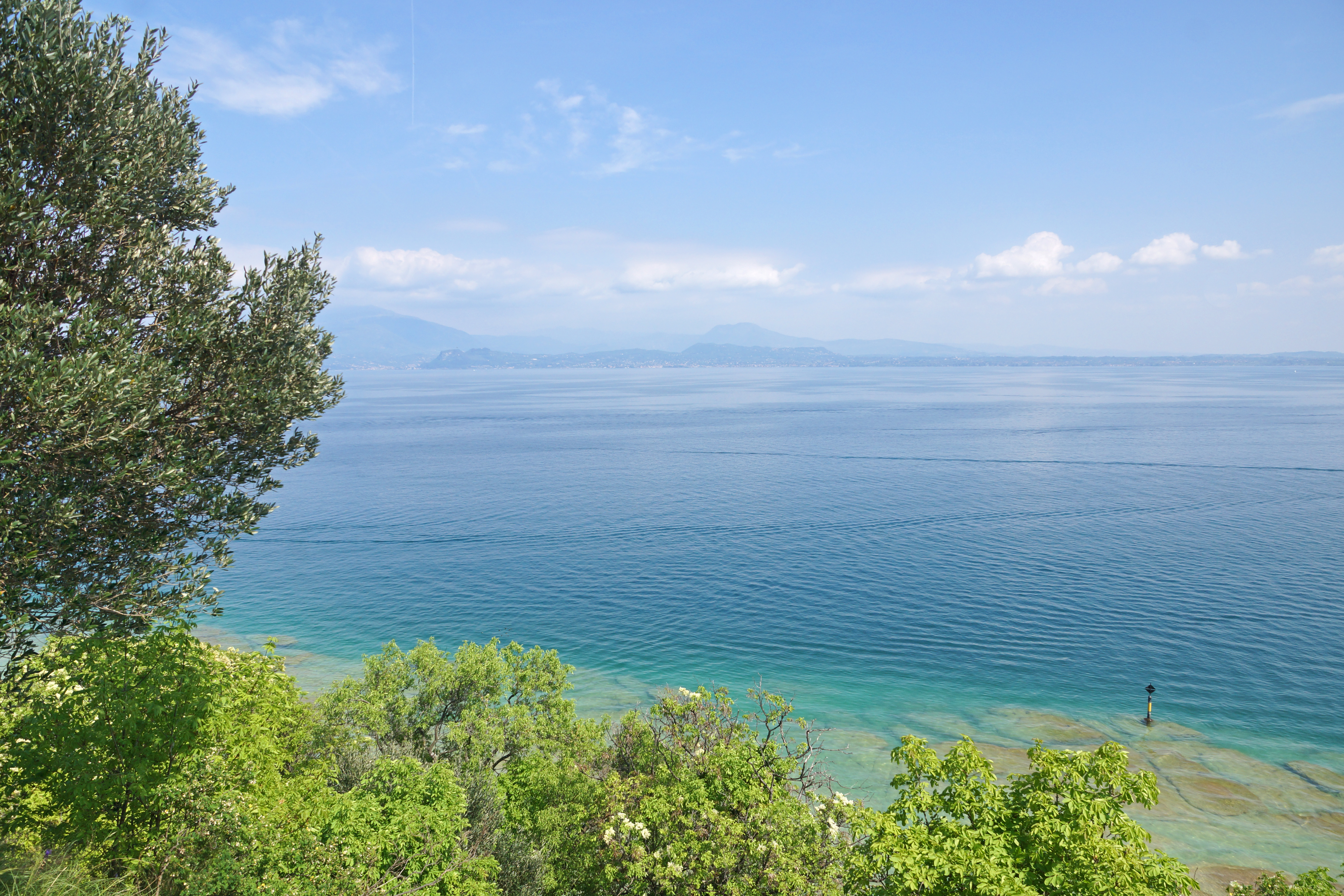
The lake seen from the northern part of the peninsula
