= Scaligero Castle (Sirmione) =

Castle on Lake Garda in Sirmione, Italy

Scaligero Castle of Sirmione
- Castello scaligero di Sirmione
- Lombardy; Near Sirmione in Italy
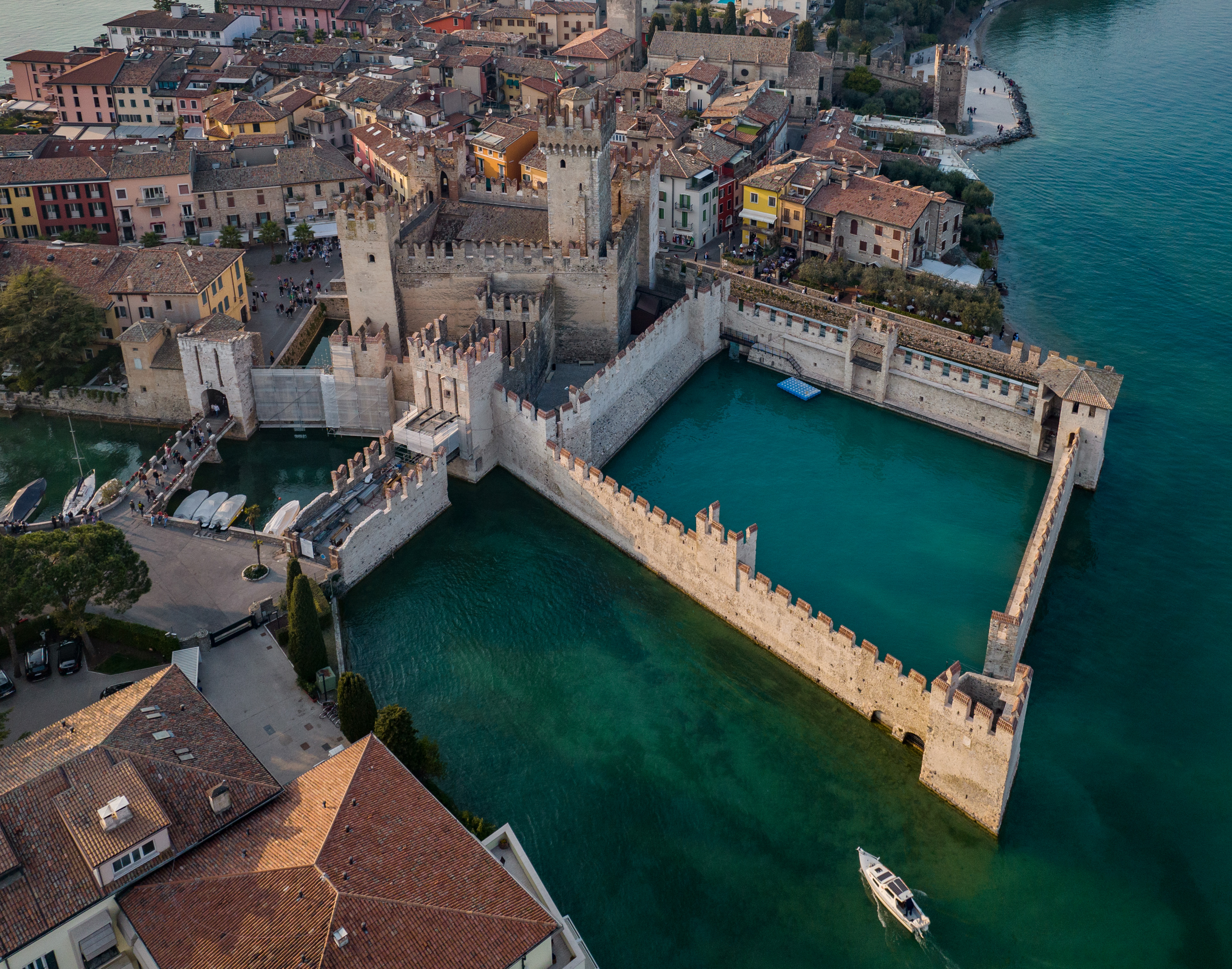

Site information
- Owner: Scaligeri
- Open to the public: Yes

Location
- Coordinates: 45°29′31″N 10°36′30″E

Site history
- Built: 13th century
- In use: 14th century
- Materials: bricks, stone and mortar

The Scaligero Castle or Scaligero Castle of Sirmione (Italian: Castello scaligero di Sirmione) is a fortress from the Scaliger era, an access point to the historical centre of Sirmione, on Lake Garda. It is one of Italy's best-preserved castles. In 2024, it was the 29th most visited attraction in Italy, with 262,095 visitors, and a total gross income of €1,125,881.

== History ==
It was built in the latter half of the 14th century on the southernmost part of Lake Garda in Northern Italy. Construction was initiated on behalf of the Della Scala family of Verona, who are known as the Scaligeri, from which it takes its name. The family ruled Verona and a large part of the Venetian area from the years 1259 to 1387.

The castle was later controlled by the Republic of Venice from the 15th century after the Della Scala family submitted to Venice in 1405. It continued to be an important fortification in the area. Its decline in importance began with the completion of the nearby fortress in Peschiera del Garda in the 16th century.

It continued to be used as an armory and fortification until the Unification of Italy when it became the office of the local government of Sirmione. Restoration began after World War I in 1919, when it became a museum and tourist attraction. However, it was not fully restored until 2018 when the internal waters of the castle were cleared. The internal docks are the only surviving example of a 14th-century fortified port.

== In culture ==
In 1980, the Italian Post Office dedicated a 600 lire stamp to the castle, part of the collection known as " Castelli d'Italia ".

== See also ==
- List of castles in Italy
