= Grottoes of Catullus =

Ruins of a Roman villa in Sirmione, Italy

- Grotte di Catullo
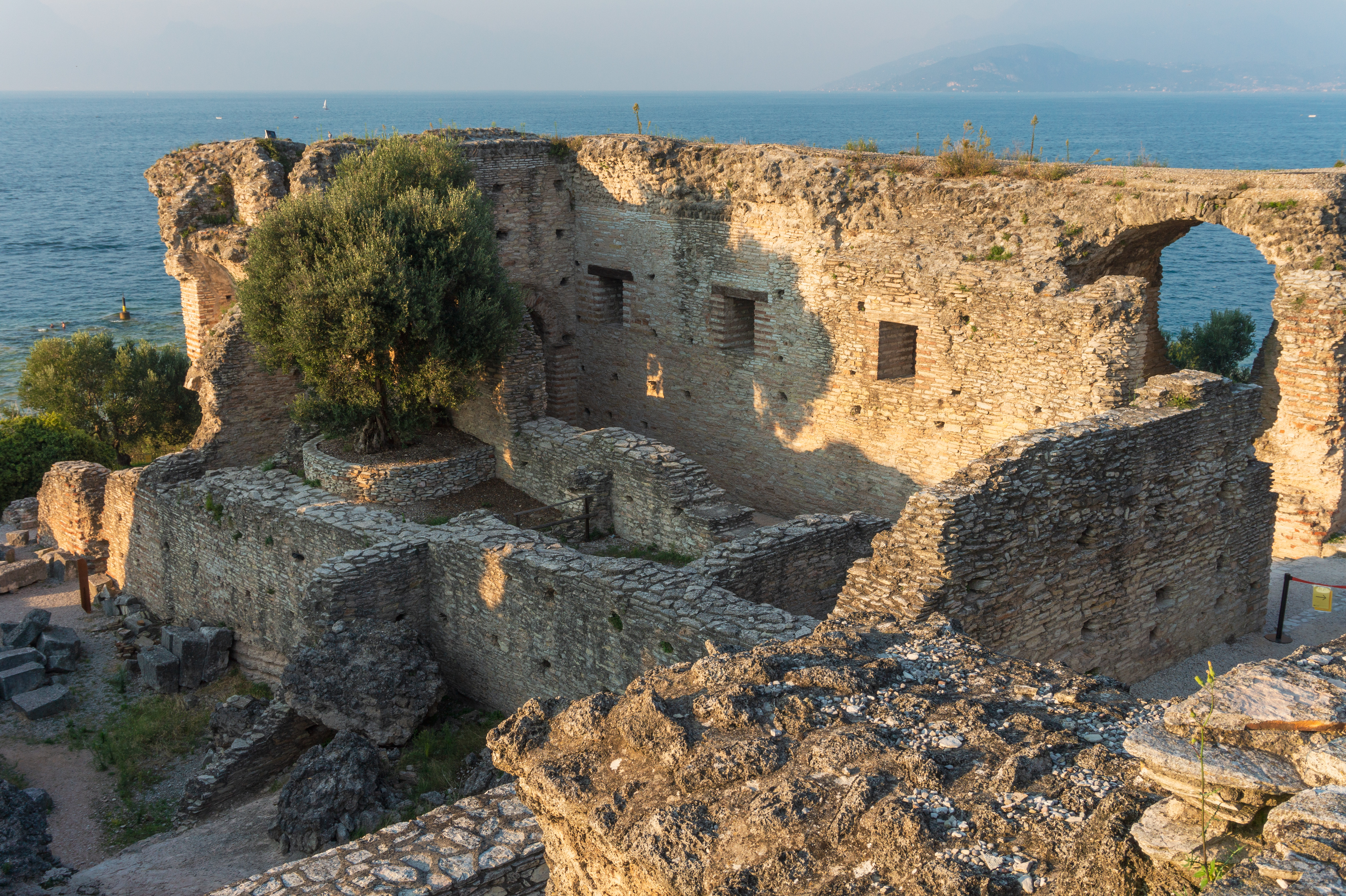
- Residential area of the villa

- Location within Italy
- 45°30′6″N 10°36′22″E
- Type: Dwelling
- Periods: Roman Imperial
- Cultures: Roman
- Location: Sirmione, Province of Brescia, Lombardy, Italy

Site notes
- Condition: Ruined
- Owner: Public
- Public access: Yes
- Website: Grotte di Catullo

Grottoes of Catullus is the name given to the ruins of a Roman villa built between the end of the 1st century BC and the beginning of the 1st century AD at the northernmost end of the Sirmione peninsula on the southern shore of Lake Garda.

The archaeological complex, which always remained uncovered over time, has been the subject of academic research since the 15th century. Today, it is the most valuable testament of the Roman period in Sirmione's territory and an exceptional find of a Roman villa in northern Italy. The site, which includes the archaeological museum of Sirmione, was the twenty-seventh most visited Italian site in 2013, with 215,961 visitors and a total gross income of €504,700.

== Etymology ==
The name dates to the 15th century. The rediscovery of Catullus's lyric poems of that time—in the 31st poem, the poet describes his return to his beloved house in Sirmione—inspired the connection with the Roman villa. Its remains there still visible, although mostly covered with vegetation and buried to the point that it looked like a cave.

The first to attribute the villa to Catullus was Marino Sanuto the Younger in 1483. This hypothesis was later taken up by erudite and scholars, even though the villa visible today was built after the Veronese poet's death. There is no hard evidence to identify Catullus's house; however, the term has remained and is still used today.

Famous travellers visited the villa, including the Marquise of Mantua Isabella d'Este (in 1514 and 1535) and the Italian architect Andrea Palladio, who studied the villa's construction techniques.

== History ==
Botteghe (substructions on the western side of the villa)

The large villa, under which structures of the 1st century BC were found, was built at the beginning of the 1st century AD. The villa must have been abandoned in the 3rd century when part of its architectural decoration was reused in the other Roman villa in Sirmione located on the present-day via Antiche Mura. Between the 4th and 5th centuries, the villa's imposing surviving structures were included in the fortifications that enclosed the Sirmione peninsula and burials were built inside the remains of the Roman building, used as a cemetery.

Over the centuries, several chroniclers and travellers visited the ruins. However, the first comprehensive studies were conducted in 1801 by General Lacombe-Saint-Michel, the Napoleonic army commander. Subsequently, the Veronese count Giovanni Girolamo Orti Manara performed some excavations and surveys published in 1856.

In 1939, the National Superintendence for Archaeological Heritage started an extensive excavations and restorations program; it acquired the entire area in 1948 to guarantee adequate protection of the complex and its natural environment. During the 1990s, further studies confirmed that the construction was carried out through a unitary project, which defined the orientation and distribution of the internal spaces according to a precise axiality and symmetry criterion. An archaeological museum collecting finds from the area was inaugurated in 1999.

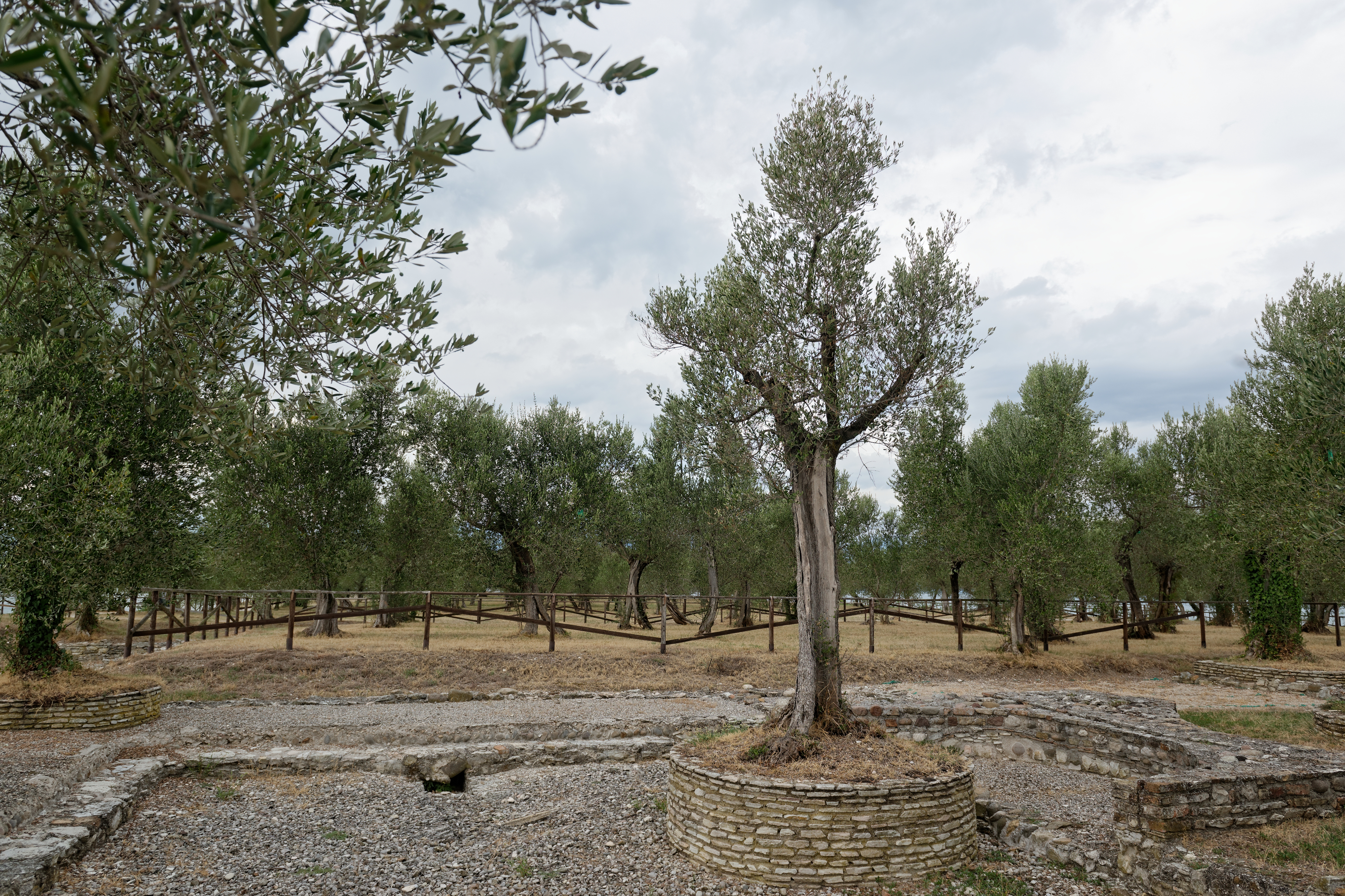
Grande oliveto ("Large olive grove")

In the 2010s, a recovery program of the historic olive grove has been completed. About 1500 olive trees, some centuries old, are currently present across the whole site, belonging to three different varieties typical of the area (casaliva, leccino and gargnà). The olive harvest to produce extra virgin olive oil resumed in 2012.

== Site description ==
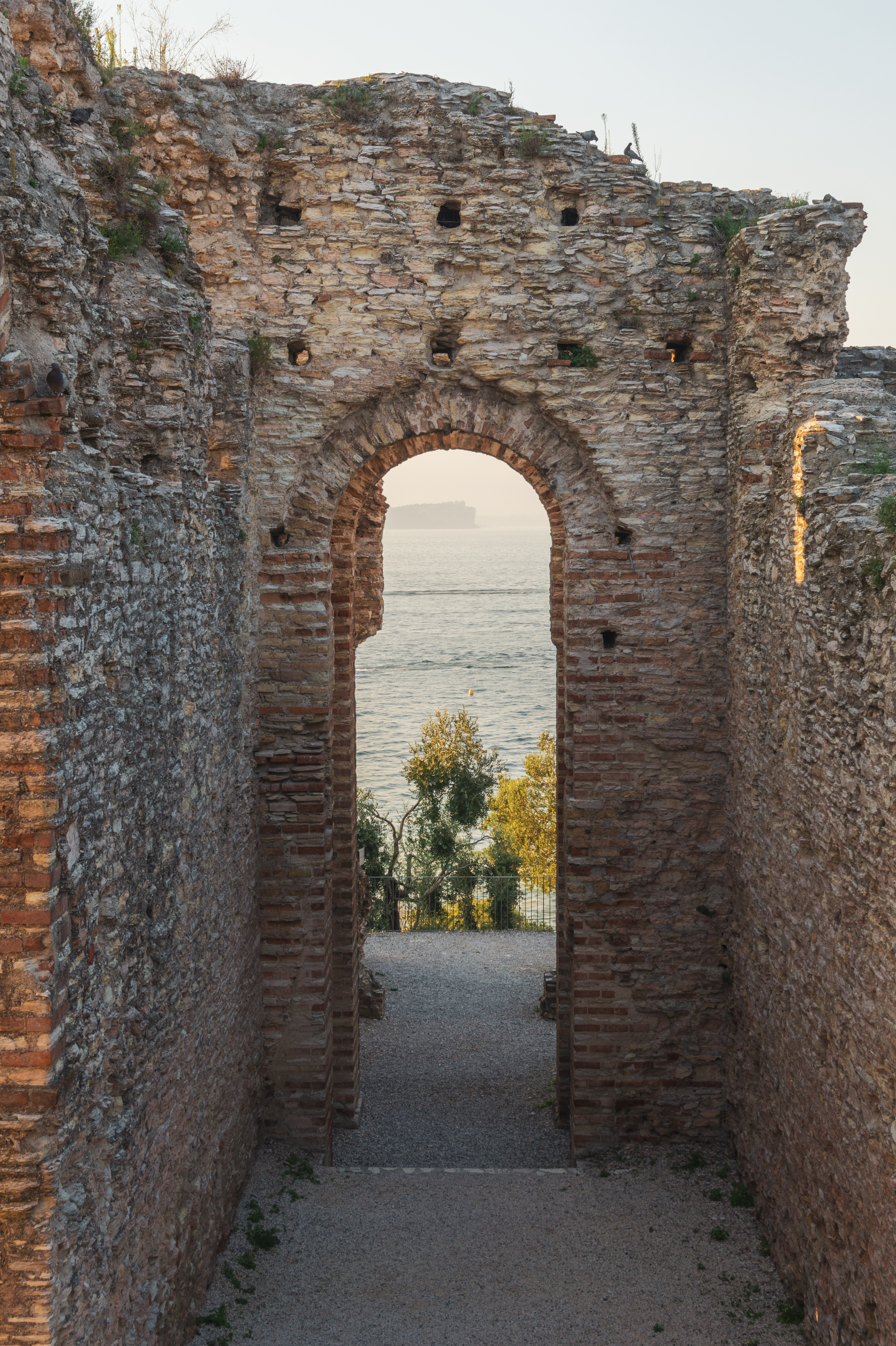
Northern substructions of the residential building

The archaeological complex, still partially unearthed today, covers an area of about two hectares. The villa has a rectangular plan of 167 × 105 m with two foreparts on the north and south sides. To overcome the inclination of the rocky bank on which the building was set, large support structures, called substructions, were created in the northern part, and substantial cuts were made to model the rocky bank.

The main floor, corresponding to the owner's home, is the most damaged, both because it was the most exposed and because the villa, after its abandonment, has been a quarry for materials for several centuries. The intermediate and lower floors instead are better preserved.

The main entrance to the building was in the southern forepart. The villa was characterized by long porches and terraces open towards the lake along the east and west sides, communicating to the north with a large belvedere terrace, equipped with a velarium.

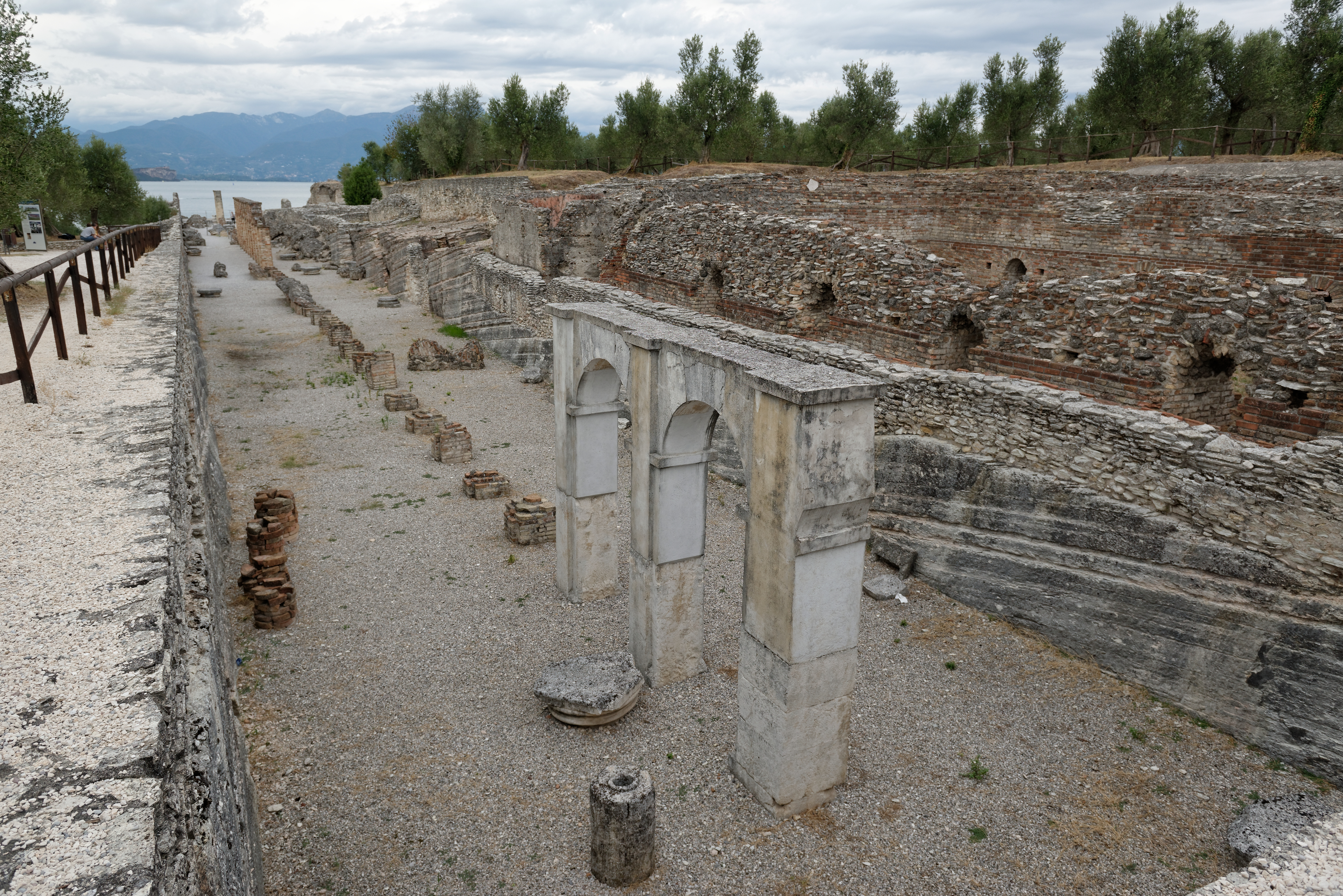
The cryptoporticus on the western side

Along the western side, there is a cryptoporticus, a long walk once covered. The residential parts of the building were in the north and south areas, while the central region, made up today of the grande oliveto, was occupied by a garden. On the southern side, under an opus spicatum floor, there is a large cistern almost forty-three meters long, which collected the water necessary for daily use. The extensive thermal sector of the villa, consisting of several rooms located in the south-western area, including a swimming pool, was probably obtained at the beginning of the 2nd century.

The various rooms of the villa have suggestive conventional names, derived from established local tradition or interpretations formulated during the first excavations. On the northern side of the ruins can be found l'Aula dei tre pilastri ("The three-pillar hall"), il lungo corridoio ("The long corridor"), la trifora del paradiso ("The trifora of heaven"), il grande pilone ("The big pylon"), la grotta del cavallo ("The horse cave") and l'aula dei giganti ("The hall of giants").

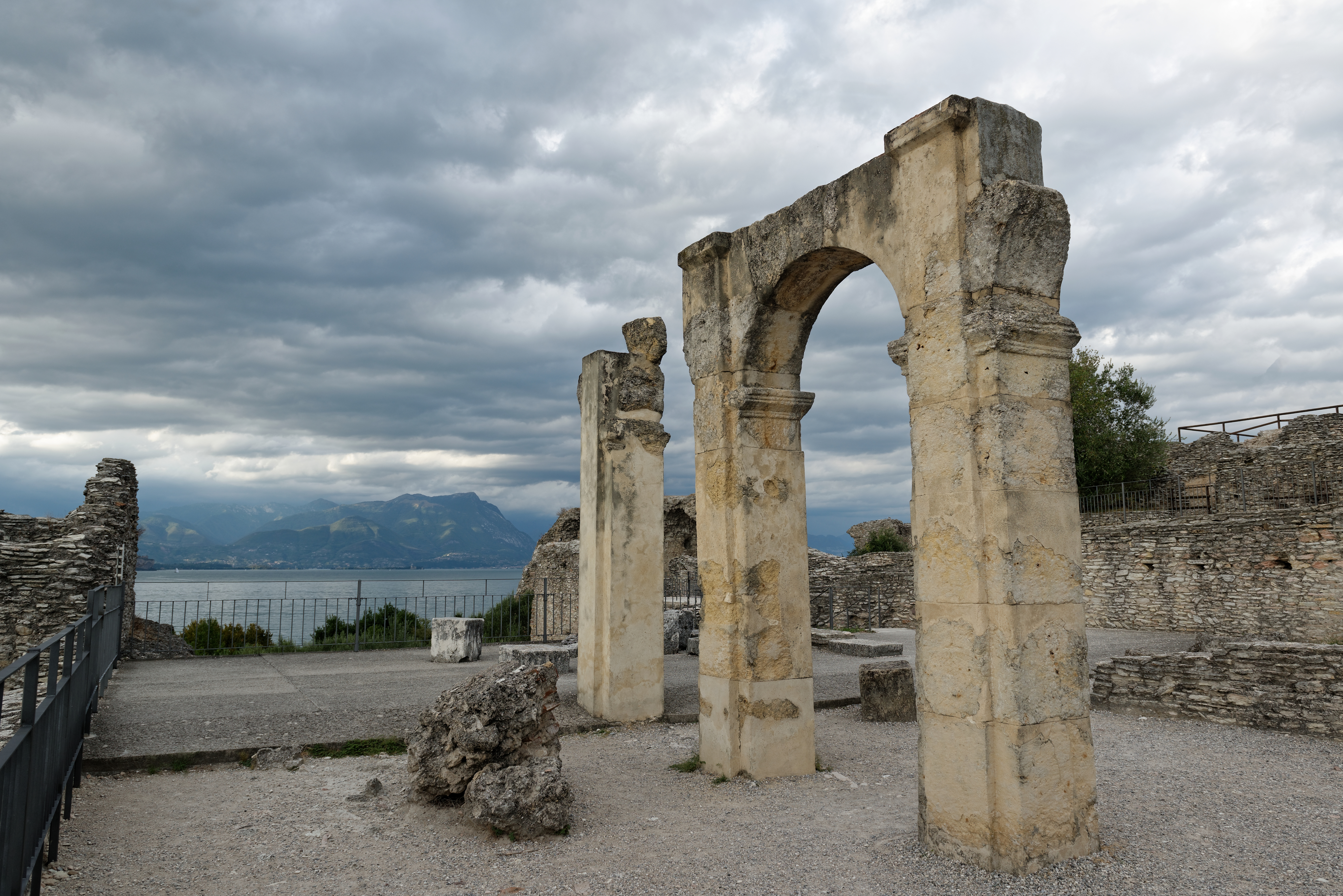
Arco imperiale
Imperial arch

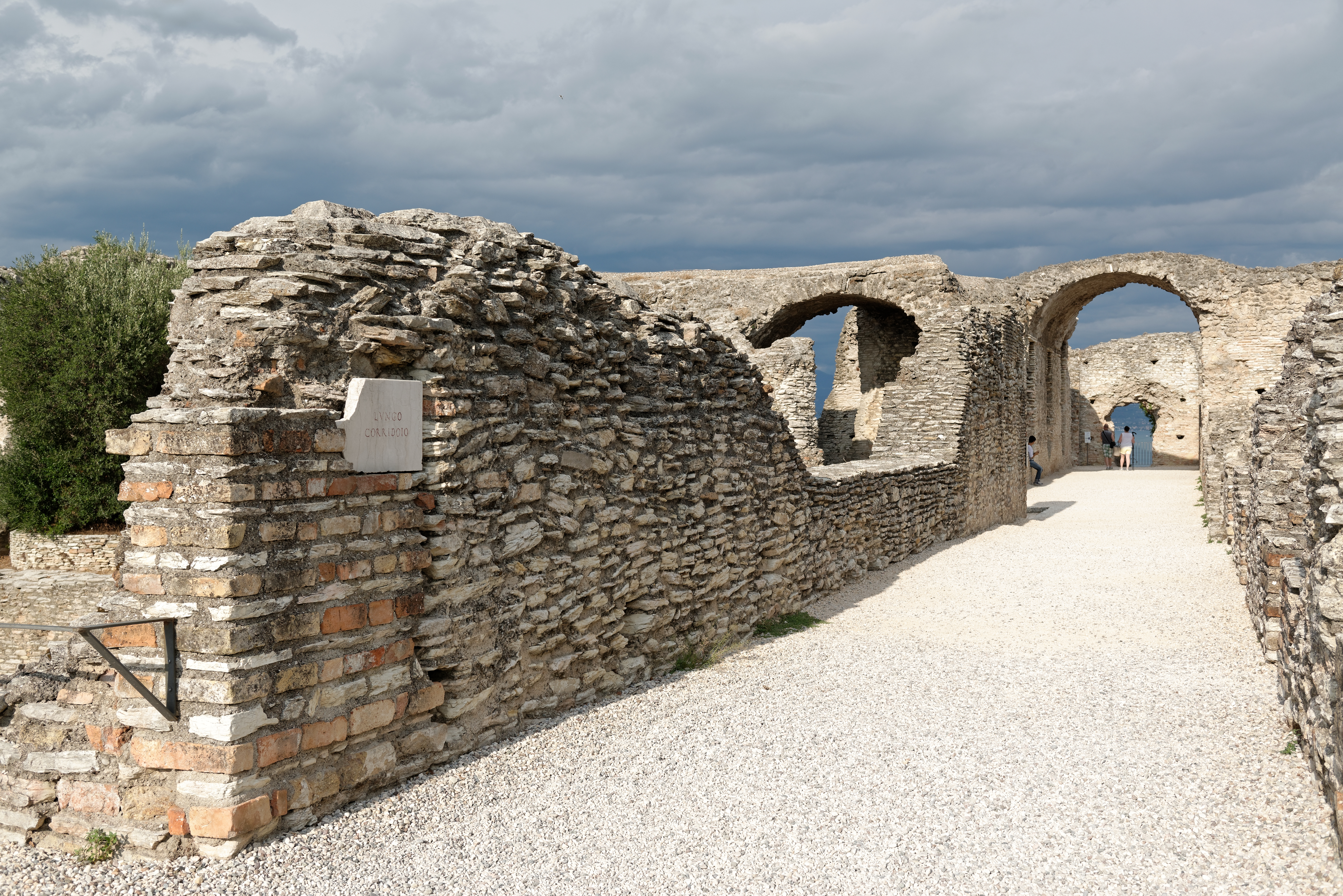
Il lungo corridoio
"Long corridor"

Trifora del paradiso
"Trifora of heaven"

== In popular culture ==
The site was one of the sets in the 2017 movie Call Me by Your Name (recipient of four nominations and one Academy award).

== Gallery ==
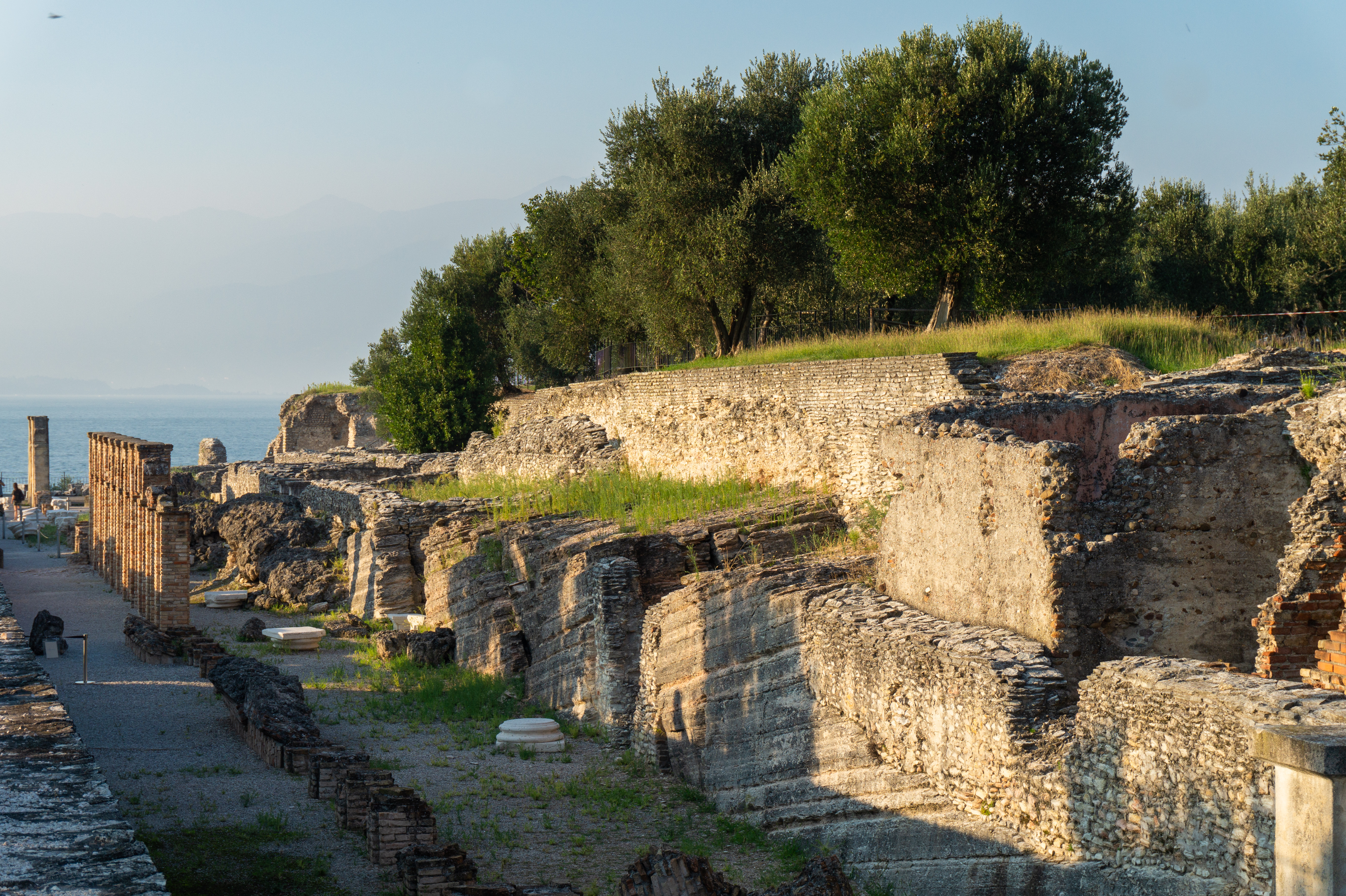
Ruins of the double cryptoporticus

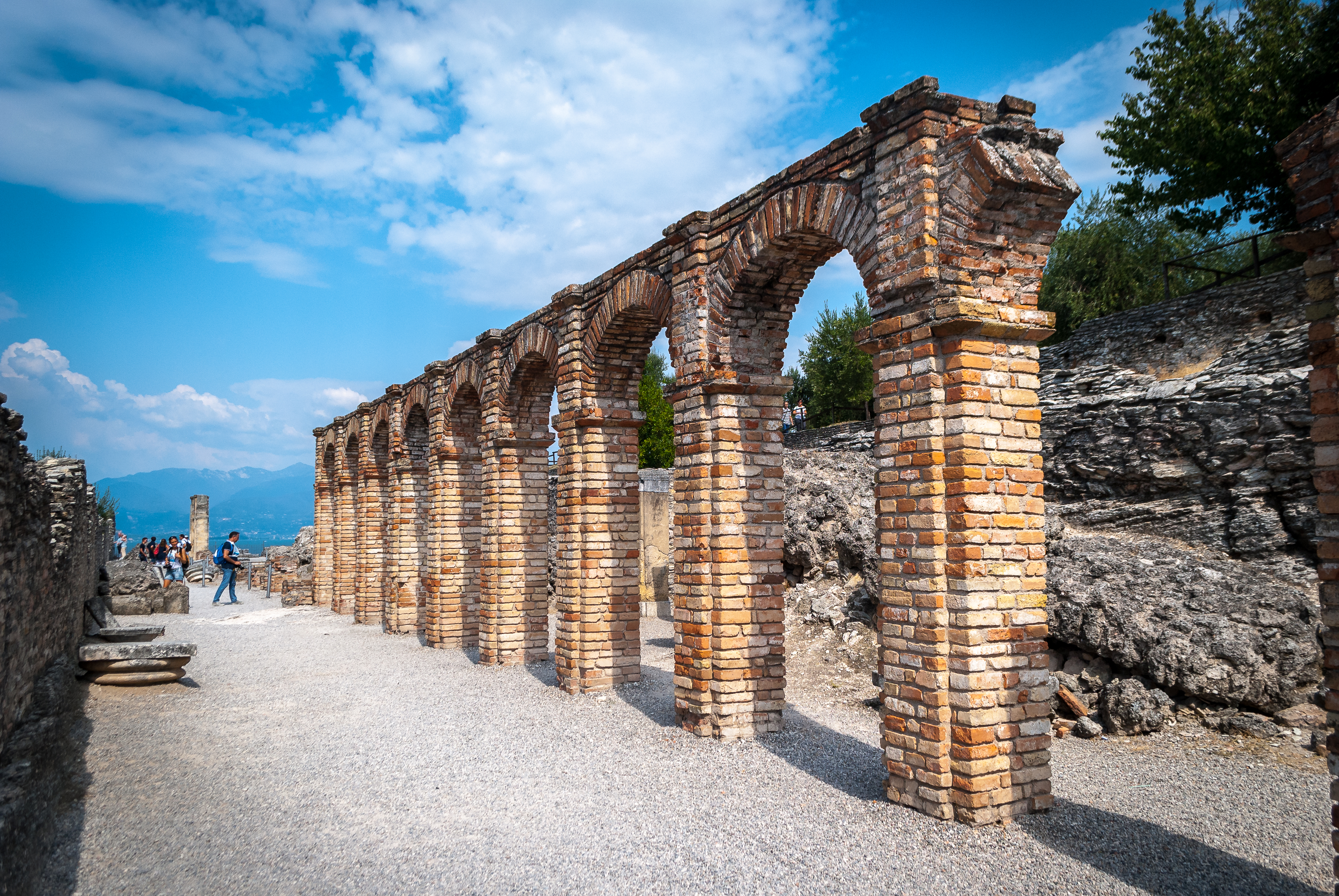
The cryptoporticus seen at ground level

Residential area crossed by the Lungo corridoio

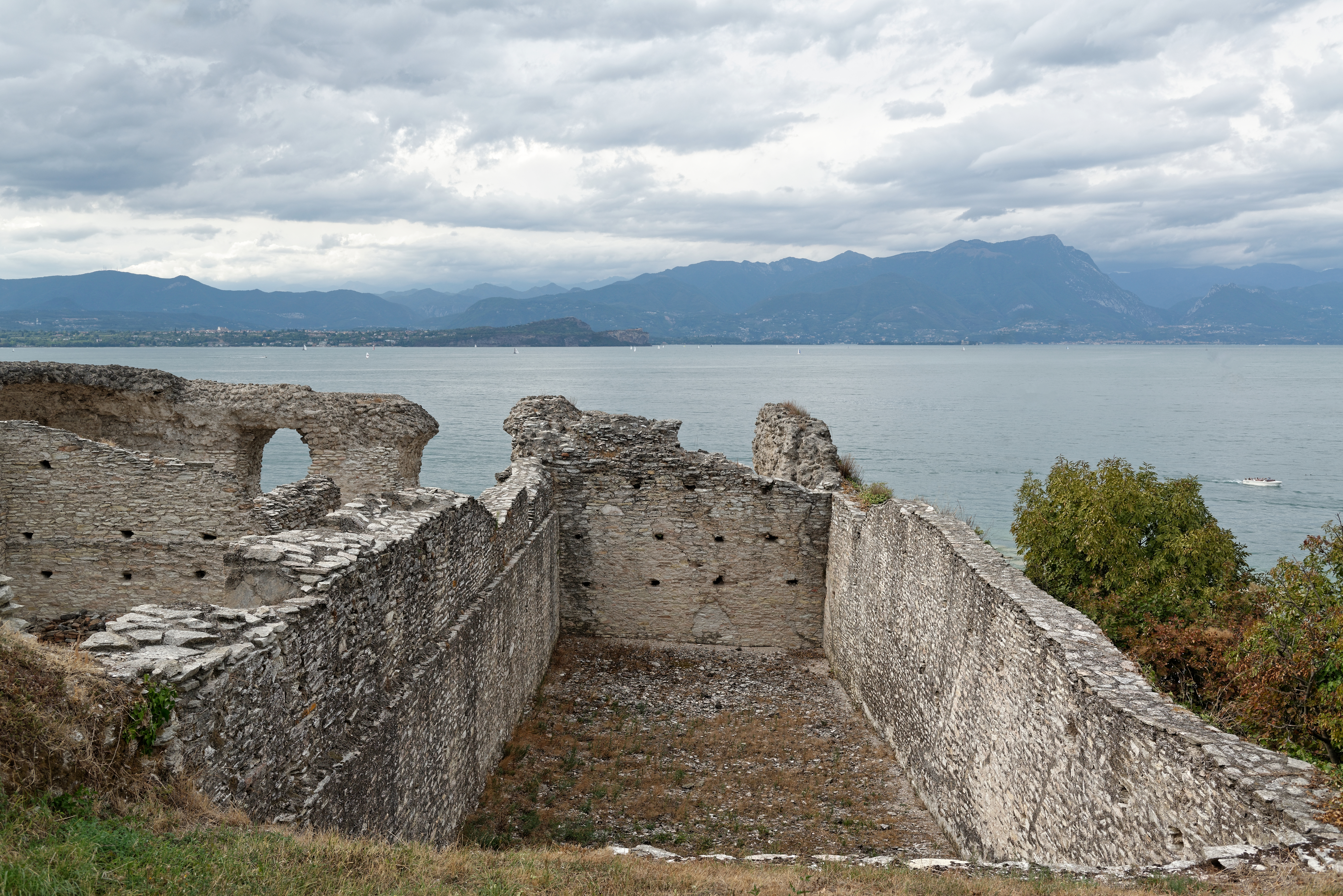
Substructions in the residential area

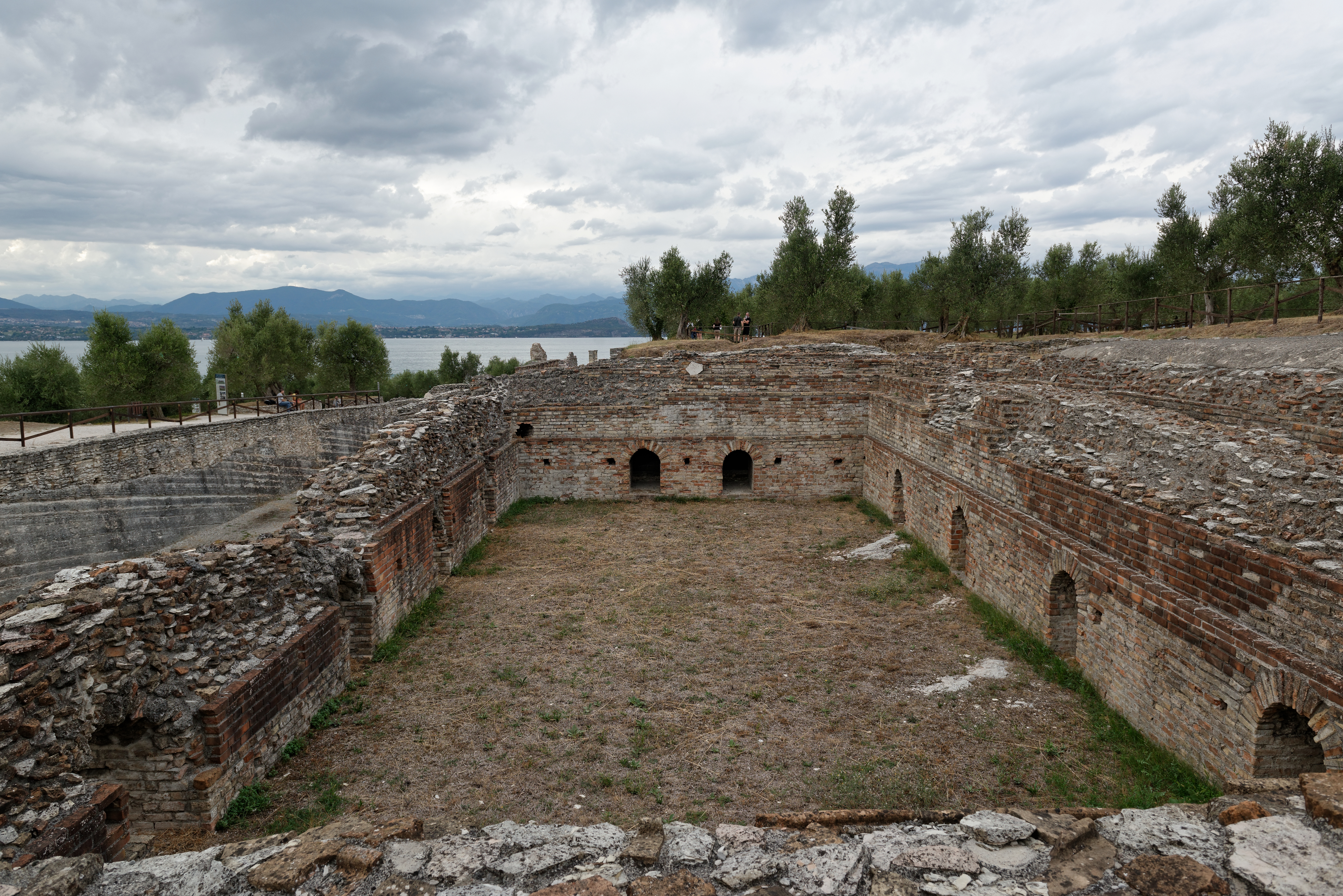
Swimming pool

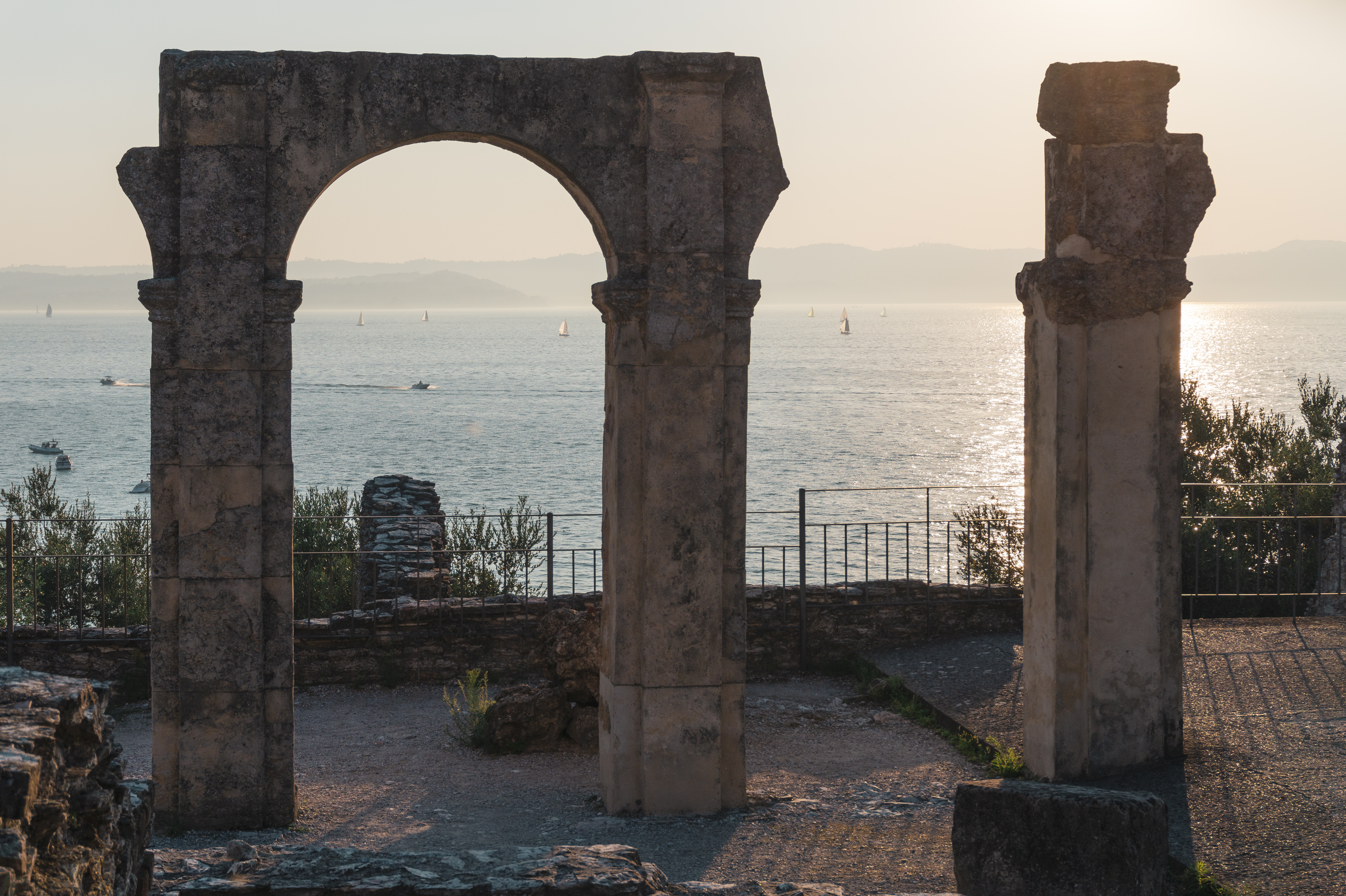
The Arco imperiale facing Lake Garda

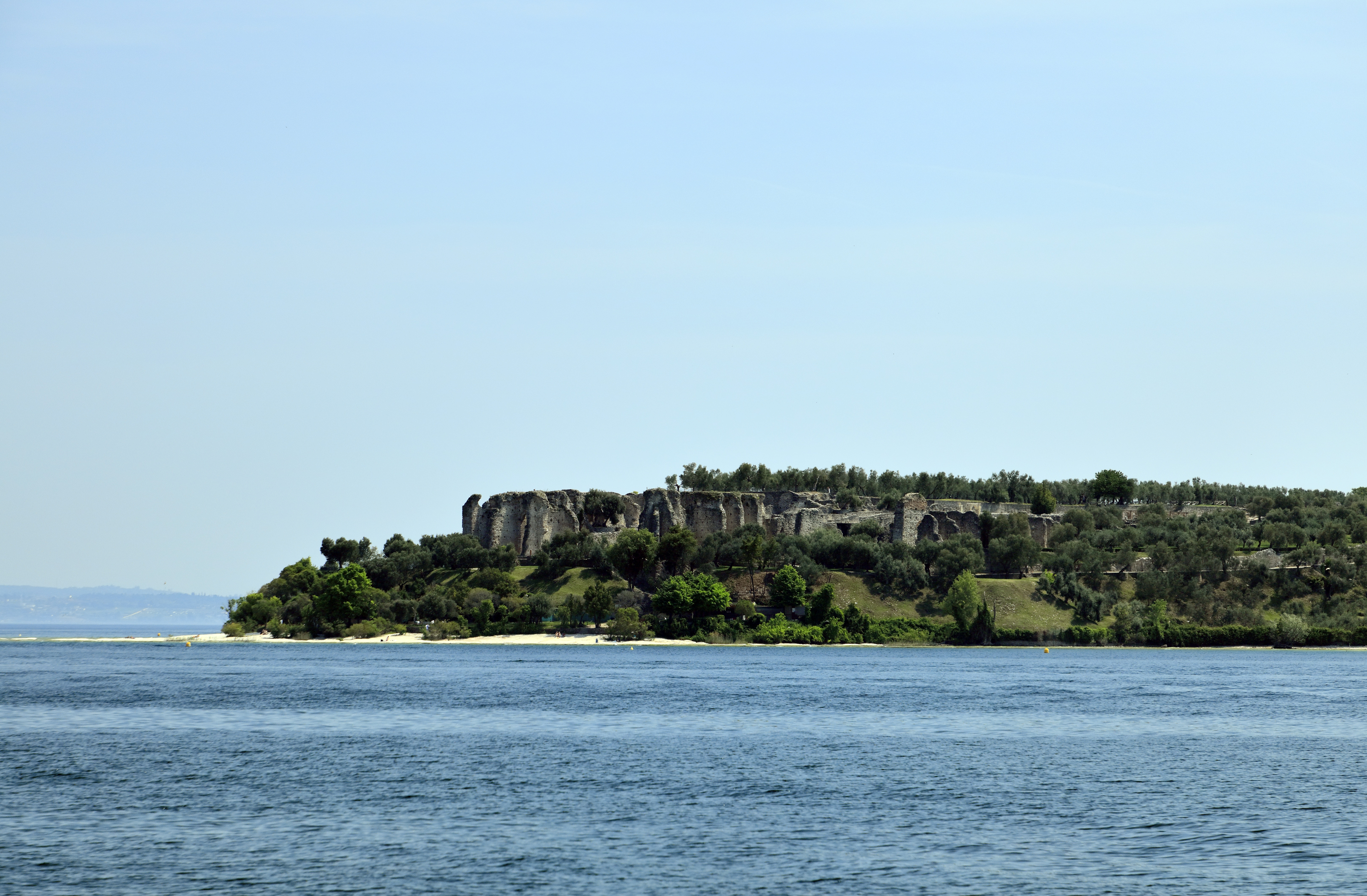
View from the lake
