= Loděnice (river) =

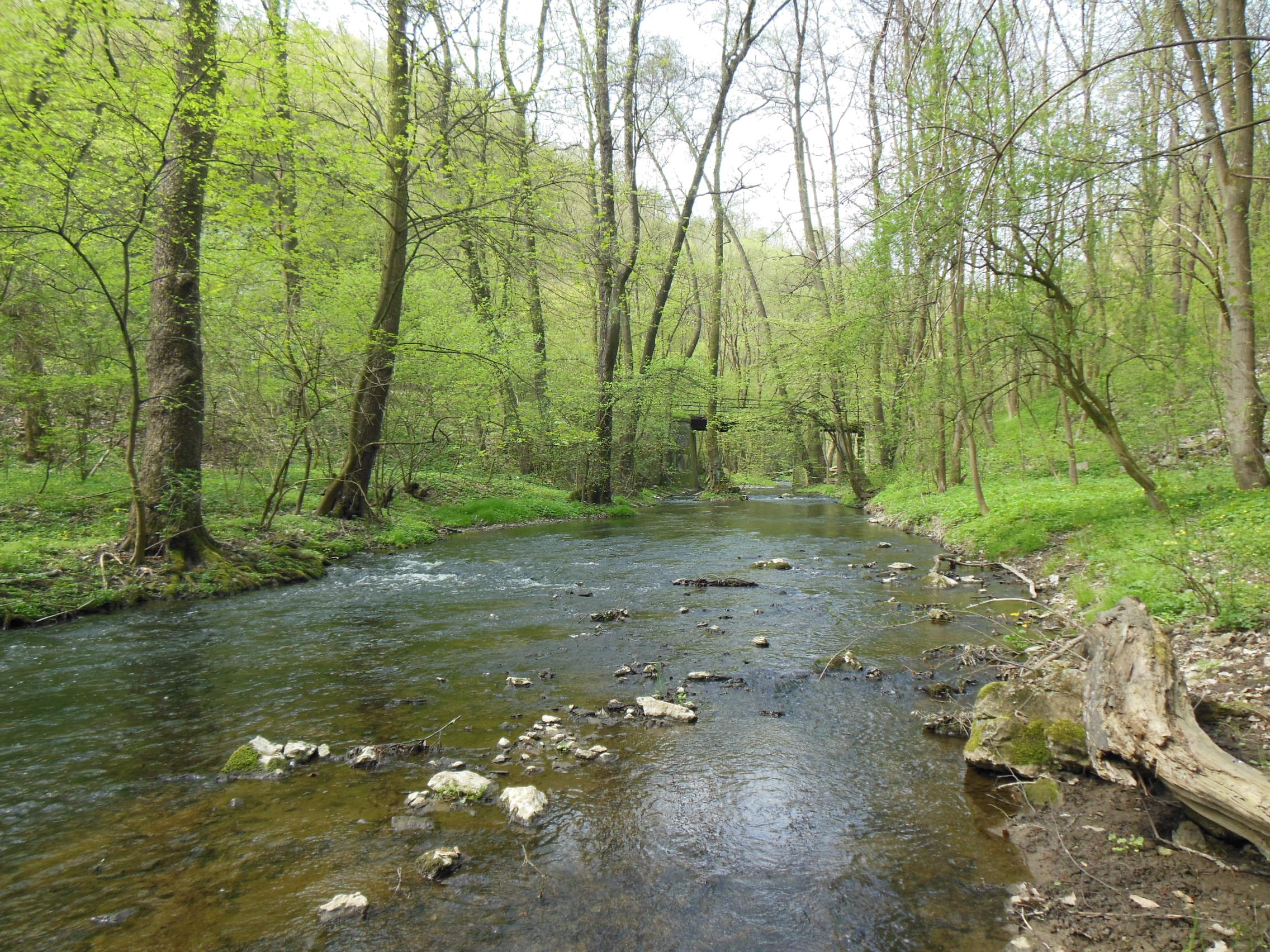
- The Loděnice in Beroun-Hostim

Location
- Country: Czech Republic
- Region: Central Bohemian

Physical characteristics
- Source
  - location: Řevničov, Džbán
  - coordinates: 50°12′7″N 13°45′58″E
  - elevation: 497 m (1,631 ft)
- Mouth
  - location: Berounka
  - coordinates: 49°56′53″N 14°7′38″E
  - elevation: 210 m (690 ft)
- Length: 64.7 km (40.2 mi)
- Basin size: 270.2 km^{2} (104.3 sq mi)
- Discharge
  - average: 0.53 m^{3}/s (19 cu ft/s) near estuary

Basin features
- Progression: Berounka→ Vltava→ Elbe→ North Sea

The Loděnice (Czech pronunciation: [ˈloɟɛɲɪtsɛ]) is a river in the Czech Republic, a left tributary of the Berounka River. It flows through the Central Bohemian Region. It is 64.7 km (40.2 mi) long.

== Etymology ==
The name literally means 'shipyard' in Czech, but this is just a coincidence. The name is derived from the word loď (i.e. 'boat', 'ship') and the old Czech adjective loděná (řeka), meaning "the river on which boats are ridden". The river is also sometimes called Kačák, after the village of Kačice.

== Characteristic ==
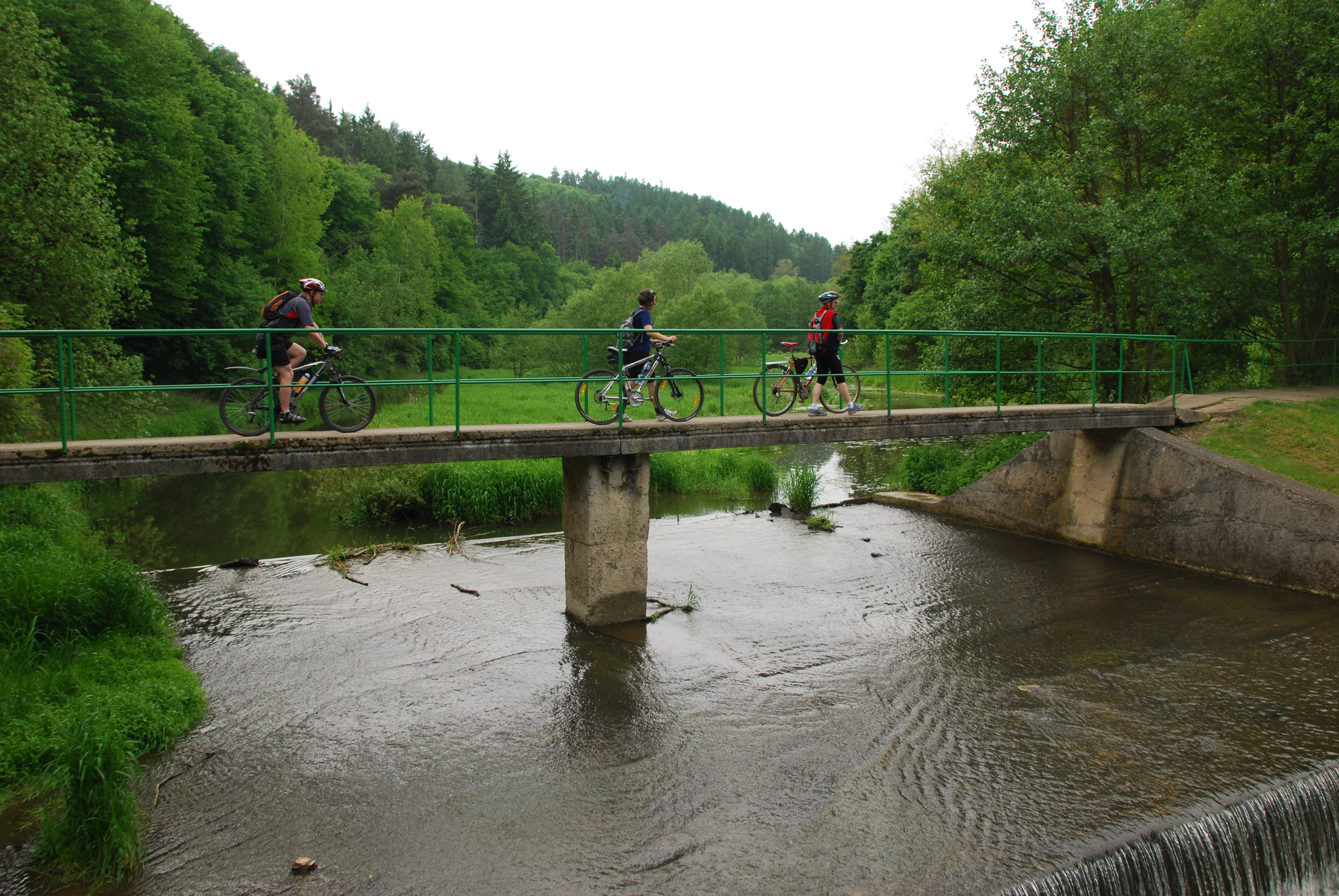
Bridge over the Loděnice near Unhošť

The Loděnice originates in the territory of Řevničov in the Džbán range at an elevation of 497 m (1,631 ft) and flows to Srbsko, where it enters the Berounka River at an elevation of 210 m (690 ft). It is 64.7 km (40.2 mi) long. Its drainage basin has an area of 270.2 km^{2} (104.3 sq mi).

The Loděnice has no significant tributaries. The longest tributaries of the Loděnice are:

Tributary	Length (km)	Side
Černý potok	7.8	left
Výskyta	6.7	right
Tuchlovický potok	6.7	right

== Course ==
The most populated municipality located directly on the river is Loděnice, named after the river. The river also briefly crosses the territory of the town of Beroun. The river flows through the municipal territories of Řevničov, Třtice, Mšec, Mšecké Žehrovice, Stochov, Kačice, Tuchlovice, Kamenné Žehrovice, Doksy, Družec, Bratronice, Horní Bezděkov, Malé Kyšice, Chyňava, Unhošť, Svárov, Ptice, Nenačovice, Chrustenice, Loděnice, Svatý Jan pod Skalou, Beroun and Srbsko.

== Bodies of water ==
There are 229 bodies of water in the basin area. Many fishponds are built on the Loděnice, especially on its upper and middle course. The largest of them is Turyňský rybník with an area of 51 ha (130 acres).

== Protection of nature ==
The Loděnice alternately flows through several protected areas. The upper course is located within the Džbán Nature Park. The middle course in protected as the Povodí Kačáku Nature Park. The lower course flows through the Bohemian Karst Protected Landscape Area. In addition to the large-scale protected areas, the river flows through several small-scale specially protected areas:

- V Bahnách Nature Reserve (area 8.6 ha (21 acres); peat and bog deposits with aquatic, wetland and meadow communities of plants and animals, including rare species);
- Záplavy Nature Reserve (area 23.7 ha (59 acres); an important nesting site and migration stop for water birds and wetland birds);
- Kalspot Nature Monument (area 3.6 ha (9 acres); a wetland biotope rich in amphibians);
- Karlštejn National Nature Reserve (area 1,547.1 ha (3,823 acres); an extensive example of the typical nature of the Bohemian Karst).

== See also ==
- List of rivers of the Czech Republic
