= List of twin towns and sister cities in Italy =

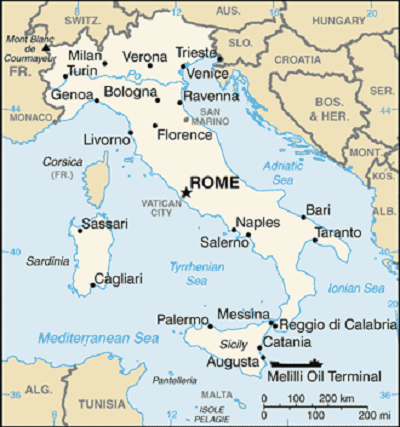
Map of Italy

This is a list of municipalities in Italy which have standing links to local communities in other countries known as "town twinning" (usually in Europe) or "sister cities" (usually in the rest of the world).

== A ==
Abano Terme

- Bad Füssing, Germany
- Lipik, Croatia
- Molos-Agios Konstantinos, Greece
- Shibukawa, Japan

Acquaviva delle Fonti

- San Miguel de Allende, Mexico

Adria

- Chieri, Italy
- Ermont, France
- Lampertheim, Germany
- Maldegem, Belgium
- Rovinj, Croatia

Agrigento

- Perm, Russia
- Tampa, United States
- Valenciennes, France

Alba

- Arlon, Belgium
- Banská Bystrica, Slovakia
- Beausoleil, France
- Böblingen, Germany
- Giresun, Turkey
- Medford, United States
- Sant Cugat del Vallès, Spain

Albano Laziale

- Białogard, Poland
- Homburg, Germany
- Koszalin, Poland

Alessandria

- Alba Iulia, Romania
- Argenteuil, France
- Hradec Králové, Czech Republic
- Jericho, Palestine
- Karlovac, Croatia
- Rosario, Argentina
- Ryazan, Russia

Alghero

- Balaguer, Spain
- Encamp, Andorra
- Palma de Mallorca, Spain
- Tarragona, Spain

Anagni

- Gniezno, Poland
- L'Isle-sur-la-Sorgue, France

Ancona

- Çeşme, Turkey
- Galaţi, Romania
- Split, Croatia
- Zadar, Croatia

Anzio

- Bad Pyrmont, Germany
- Brooklyn (New York), United States
- Caen, France
- Paphos, Cyprus

Aosta

- Albertville, France
- Chamonix-Mont-Blanc, France
- Kaolack, Senegal
- Narbonne, France
- Sinaia, Romania

Aprilia

- Ben Arous, Tunisia
- Mostardas, Brazil
- Tulcea, Romania

L'Aquila

- Bariloche, Argentina
- Bernalda, Italy
- Bistrița, Romania
- Cento, Italy
- Cuenca, Spain
- Figueira da Foz, Portugal
- Foggia, Italy
- Hobart, Australia
- Rottweil, Germany
- Sant'Angelo d'Alife, Italy
- Zielona Góra, Poland

Arco

- Belœil, Belgium
- Bogen, Germany
- Roccella Ionica, Italy
- Rýmařov, Czech Republic
- Schotten, Germany

Arenzano

- El Jadida, Morocco
- Loutraki-Perachora, Greece
- Pontoise, France
- Tata, Hungary

Arezzo

- Burbank, United States
- Norman, United States
- Oświęcim, Poland
- Viseu, Portugal

Ariccia

- Cournon-d'Auvergne, France
- Lichtenfels, Germany
- Prestwick, Scotland, United Kingdom
- Santa Margherita di Belice, Italy

Arona

- Arona, Spain
- Compiègne, France
- Huy, Belgium

Ascoli Piceno

- Massy, France
- Trier, Germany

Assago

- Nozay, France
- Střelice, Czech Republic

Assisi

- Bethlehem, Palestine
- San Francisco, United States
- Santiago de Compostela, Spain
- Wadowice, Poland

Asti

- Biberach an der Riß, Germany
- Delano, United States
- Ma'alot-Tarshiha, Israel
- Miami, United States
- Valence, France
- Veliko Tarnovo, Bulgaria

Avezzano

- Ayacucho, Peru
- Belén, Argentina
- Câmpulung Moldovenesc, Romania
- Santa María, Argentina

== B ==
Bagnacavallo

- Aix-Villemaur-Pâlis, France
- Neresheim, Germany
- Strzyżów, Poland

Barberino Tavarnelle

- Béboto, Chad
- Bodo, Chad
- Edchera, Western Sahara
- Fălticeni, Romania
- Gagny, France
- Hatvan, Hungary
- Schliersee, Germany
- Tangermünde, Germany

Barga

- East Lothian, Scotland, United Kingdom
- Gällivare, Sweden
- Hayange, France

Bari

- Banja Luka, Bosnia and Herzegovina
- (Georgia (country)) Batumi, Georgia
- Corfu, Greece
- Durrës, Albania
- Guangzhou, China
- Kostroma, Russia
- Mar del Plata, Argentina
- Monte Sant'Angelo, Italy
- Palma de Mallorca, Spain
- Patras, Greece
- Podgorica, Montenegro
- San Giovanni Rotondo, Italy
- Słupsk, Poland
- Szczecin, Poland

Barletta

- Herceg Novi, Montenegro

Bassano del Grappa

- Mostar, Bosnia and Herzegovina
- Mühlacker, Germany
- Nova Bassano, Brazil
- Voiron, France

Bellagio is a member of the Douzelage, a town twinning association of towns across the European Union, alongside with:

- Agros, Cyprus
- Altea, Spain
- Asikkala, Finland
- Bad Kötzting, Germany
- (Republic of Ireland) Bundoran, Ireland
- Chojna, Poland
- Granville, France
- Holstebro, Denmark
- Houffalize, Belgium
- Judenburg, Austria
- Kőszeg, Hungary
- Marsaskala, Malta
- Meerssen, Netherlands
- Niederanven, Luxembourg
- Oxelösund, Sweden
- Preveza, Greece
- Rokiškis, Lithuania
- Rovinj, Croatia
- Sesimbra, Portugal
- Sherborne, England, United Kingdom
- Sigulda, Latvia
- Siret, Romania
- Škofja Loka, Slovenia
- Sušice, Czech Republic
- Tryavna, Bulgaria
- Türi, Estonia
- Zvolen, Slovakia

Bergamo

- Bengbu, China
- Bucha, Ukraine
- Cochabamba, Bolivia
- Greenville, United States
- Ludwigsburg, Germany
- Mulhouse, France
- Olkusz, Poland
- Pueblo, United States
- Tver, Russia

Biella

- Arequipa, Peru
- Kiryū, Japan
- Tourcoing, France
- Weihai, China

Bientina

- Saint-Rémy-de-Provence, France

Bologna

- Coventry, England, United Kingdom
- Kharkiv, Ukraine
- Leipzig, Germany
- La Plata, Argentina
- Portland, United States
- Saint-Louis, Senegal
- San Carlos, Nicaragua
- St. Louis, United States
- Thessaloniki, Greece
- Toulouse, France
- Tuzla, Bosnia and Herzegovina
- Valencia, Spain
- Zagreb, Croatia

Bolzano

- Erlangen, Germany
- Sopron, Hungary

Borgo San Lorenzo

- Várpalota, Hungary

Bracciano

- Châtenay-Malabry, France
- Neusäß, Germany

Brescia

- Bethlehem, Palestine
- Darmstadt, Germany
- Logroño, Spain
- Troyes, France

Brixen

- Bled, Slovenia
- Havlíčkův Brod, Czech Republic
- Regensburg, Germany

Brugherio

- Le Puy-en-Velay, France

Bruneck

- Brignoles, France
- Groß-Gerau, Germany
- Szamotuły, Poland
- Tielt, Belgium

== C ==
=== Ca ===
Cagli

- Spokane, United States

Caltanissetta

- Popayán, Colombia
- Rochester, United States

Camaiore

- Carpentras, France
- Castel di Casio, Italy
- L'Hôpital, France
- Rovinj, Croatia
- Überherrn, Germany

Campi Bisenzio

- Bir Lehlou, Western Sahara
- North Lanarkshire, Scotland, United Kingdom
- Orly, France
- Pallagorio, Italy

Cantù

- Dumfries, Scotland, United Kingdom

Capannori

- La Gaude, France
- Losheim am See, Germany
- Pillnitz (Dresden), Germany
- Pirna, Germany

Capo d'Orlando

- Culver City, United States
- Fremantle, Australia

Cappella Maggiore

- Earlston, Scotland, United Kingdom

Carmagnola

- Opatija, Croatia
- Río Tercero, Argentina

Carpi

- Oyonnax, France
- Wernigerode, Germany

Carrara

- Grasse, France
- Ingolstadt, Germany
- Kragujevac, Serbia
- Opole, Poland
- Yerevan, Armenia
- Yunfu, China

Casalecchio di Reno

- Pápa, Hungary
- Romainville, France
- Trenčín, Slovakia

Cascinette d'Ivrea

- Nový Bydžov, Czech Republic

Cassino

- Cavarzere, Italy
- Falaise, France
- Kolbuszowa, Poland
- North York (Toronto), Canada
- Ortona, Italy
- Richmond Valley, Australia
- Senglea, Malta
- Steglitz-Zehlendorf (Berlin), Germany
- Sterling Heights, United States
- Tychy, Poland
- Užice, Serbia

Castel San Pietro Terme

- Bad Salzschlirf, Germany
- Lovran, Croatia
- Matulji, Croatia
- Opatija, Croatia

Castelfranco Emilia

- Marktredwitz, Germany

Castelfranco Veneto

- Guelph, Canada

Castellarano

- Bruntál, Czech Republic
- Štúrovo, Slovakia

Castenaso

- Kamëz, Albania
- Rethymno, Greece

Castiglione del Lago

- Kopřivnice, Czech Republic
- Lempäälä, Finland
- Trappes, France

Catania

- Alexandria, Egypt
- Borgo Maggiore, San Marino
- Grenoble, France
- Kaliningrad, Russia
- Oświęcim County, Poland
- Ottawa, Canada
- Phoenix, United States

Catanzaro

- Bethlehem, Palestine

Cava de' Tirreni

- Gorzów Wielkopolski, Poland
- Kaunas, Lithuania
- Pittsfield, United States
- Schwerte, Germany

=== Ce–Ci ===
Ceprano

- Almendralejo, Spain

Cento

- L'Aquila, Italy
- Székesfehérvár, Hungary
- Vicente López, Argentina

Cerveteri

- Almuñécar, Spain
- Fürstenfeldbruck, Germany
- Livry-Gargan, France

Cesenatico

- Aubenas, France
- Schwarzenbek, Germany
- Sierre, Switzerland
- Zelzate, Belgium

Cherasco

- Aksakovo, Bulgaria
- Cefa, Romania
- Möckmühl, Germany
- Piliscsaba, Hungary
- Villars-sur-Var, France

Chieri

- Adria, Italy
- Épinal, France
- Nanoro, Burkina Faso
- Tolve, Italy

Cittadella

- Guben, Germany
- Noblesville, United States
- Nova Prata, Brazil

Civitanova Marche

- Esine, Italy
- General San Martín, Argentina
- Šibenik, Croatia
- Skawina, Poland

=== Co–Cu ===
Cogoleto

- Ober-Ramstadt, Germany
- Olympia, Greece
- Saint-André-les-Vergers, France

Collegno

- Antony, France
- Cerdanyola del Vallès, Spain
- Havířov, Czech Republic
- Neubrandenburg, Germany
- Oueslatia, Tunisia
- Rocchetta Sant'Antonio, Italy
- San Gregorio Magno, Italy
- Sarajevo, Bosnia and Herzegovina
- Sárospatak, Hungary
- Volzhsky, Russia

Comacchio

- Cres, Croatia

Como

- Fulda, Germany
- Jelgava, Latvia
- Nablus, Palestine
- Netanya, Israel
- Tōkamachi, Japan

Conselice

- Bitritto, Italy
- Bourgoin-Jallieu, France

Conselve

- Jászberény, Hungary
- Torcy, France

Corato

- Grenoble, France

Corsico

- Malakoff, France
- Mataró, Spain
- San Giovanni a Piro, Italy

Cortona

- Athens, United States
- Carmel, United States
- Château-Chinon, France
- Krujë, Albania
- San José de los Remates, Nicaragua
- Valletta, Malta

Crema

- Melun, France
- Nanning, China

Cuneo

- Fürstenberg/Havel, Germany
- Nice, France
- Richard Toll, Senegal
- Santa Fe, Argentina

== D ==
Delia

- Vaughan, Canada

Desenzano del Garda

- Amberg, Germany
- Antibes, France
- Sal, Cape Verde
- Wiener Neustadt, Austria

Dolceacqua

- Alpicat, Spain
- Monaco, Monaco

Dueville

- Calatayud, Spain
- Schorndorf, Germany
- Tulle, France

Duino-Aurisina

- Buje, Croatia
- Ilirska Bistrica, Slovenia
- Kolín, Czech Republic

== E ==
Erba

- Fellbach, Germany
- Tain-l'Hermitage, France
- Tournon-sur-Rhône, France

Ercolano

- Heist-op-den-Berg, Belgium
- Xi'an, China

Este

- Bad Windsheim, Germany
- Bethlehem, Palestine
- Fredericksburg, United States
- Leek, England, United Kingdom
- Pertuis, France
- Rijeka, Croatia
- Tapolca, Hungary

== F ==
Fabro

- Bas-en-Basset, France

Faenza

- Bergerac, France
- Gmunden, Austria
- Jingdezhen, China
- Marousi, Greece
- Rijeka, Croatia
- Schwäbisch Gmünd, Germany
- Talavera de la Reina, Spain
- Timișoara, Romania
- Toki, Japan

Fanano

- Fairbanks, United States

Fano

- Gandia, Spain
- Rastatt, Germany
- St Albans, England, United Kingdom
- Stříbro, Czech Republic
- Wieliczka, Poland

Feltre

- Bagnols-sur-Cèze, France
- Braunfels, Germany
- Carcaixent, Spain
- Dudelange, Luxembourg
- Eeklo, Belgium
- Kiskunfélegyháza, Hungary
- Newbury, England, United Kingdom

Ferentino

- Raszyn, Poland
- Rockford, United States
- San Severino Marche, Italy
- Yekaterinburg, Russia

Fermo

- Ansbach, Germany
- Bahía Blanca, Argentina
- Berat, Albania

Ferrara

- Broni, Italy
- Buenos Aires, Argentina
- Formia, Italy
- Giessen, Germany
- Highland Park, United States
- Kallithea, Greece
- Kaufbeuren, Germany
- Koper, Slovenia
- Krasnodar, Russia
- Lleida, Spain
- Prague 1 (Prague), Czech Republic
- Saint-Étienne, France
- Sarajevo, Bosnia and Herzegovina
- Swansea, Wales, United Kingdom
- Szombathely, Hungary
- Toledo, United States

Fidenza

- Herrenberg, Germany
- Kremnica, Slovakia
- Kutná Hora, Czech Republic
- Sisteron, France

Florence

- Bethlehem, Palestine
- Budapest, Hungary
- Dresden, Germany
- Edinburgh, Scotland, United Kingdom
- Fez, Morocco
- Kassel, Germany
- Kyiv, Ukraine
- Kuwait City, Kuwait
- Kyoto, Japan
- Nanjing, China
- Nazareth, Israel
- Philadelphia, United States
- Puebla, Mexico
- Reims, France
- Riga, Latvia
- Salvador, Brazil
- Sydney, Australia
- Tirana, Albania
- Turku, Finland
- Valladolid, Spain

Foggia

- L'Aquila, Italy
- Forlì, Italy
- Göppingen, Germany
- Pescasseroli, Italy
- Quimper, France
- Wałbrzych, Poland

Foligno

- Gemona del Friuli, Italy
- La Louvière, Belgium
- Shibukawa, Japan

Fondi

- Dachau, Germany

Forlì

- Aveiro, Portugal
- Bourges, France
- Elektrėnai, Lithuania
- Foggia, Italy
- Kaliningrad, Russia
- Peterborough, England, United Kingdom
- Płock, Poland
- Szolnok, Hungary

Formia

- Ferrara, Italy
- Fleury-les-Aubrais, France
- Gračanica, Bosnia and Herzegovina
- Haninge, Sweden
- Santeramo in Colle, Italy

Formigine

- (Republic of Ireland) Kilkenny, Ireland
- Saumur, France

Fossano

- Camponogara, Italy
- Długołęka, Poland
- Rafaela, Argentina

Fossombrone

- Entraigues-sur-la-Sorgue, France

Frascati

- Bad Godesberg (Bonn), Germany
- Kortrijk, Belgium
- Obninsk, Russia
- Saint-Cloud, France
- Windsor and Maidenhead, England, United Kingdom

Fratta Polesine

- Tulcea, Romania

Fucecchio

- Nogent-sur-Oise, France

Fusignano

- Biddulph, England, United Kingdom

== G ==
Gaeta

- Cambridge, United States
- Frontignan, France
- Somerville, United States

Gallipoli

- Bethlehem, Palestine
- Monfalcone, Italy

Gela

- Elefsina, Greece
- Nordkapp, Norway
- Wittingen, Germany

Gemona del Friuli

- Foligno, Italy
- Laakirchen, Austria
- Velden am Wörther See, Austria

Genoa

- Beyoğlu, Turkey
- Columbus, United States
- Marseille, France
- Murcia, Spain
- Odesa, Ukraine
- Rijeka, Croatia
- Ryazan, Russia

Genzano di Roma

- Châtillon, France
- Merseburg, Germany

Gioia del Colle

- Târgoviște, Romania

Gorizia

- Klagenfurt, Austria
- Lienz, Austria
- Sassari, Italy
- Zalaegerszeg, Hungary

Greve in Chianti

- Auxerre, France
- Brtonigla, Croatia
- Farsia, Western Sahara
- Greve, Denmark
- Jasenice, Croatia
- Rehoboth Beach, United States
- Sonoma, United States
- Ulvik, Norway
- Ushiku, Japan
- Veitshöchheim, Germany

Grosseto

- Birkirkara, Malta
- Cottbus, Germany
- Dimitrovgrad, Bulgaria
- Kashiwara, Japan
- Narbonne, France
- Saintes-Maries-de-la-Mer, France

Grottaferrata

- Bethlehem, Palestine
- Patmos, Greece
- Vandœuvre-lès-Nancy, France

Gualdo Tadino

- Audun-le-Tiche, France
- Krosno, Poland

Gubbio

- Godmanchester, England, United Kingdom
- Huntingdon, England, United Kingdom
- Jessup, United States
- Livinallongo del Col di Lana, Italy
- Salon-de-Provence, France
- Thann, France
- Wertheim, Germany

== I ==
Imola

- Colchester, England, United Kingdom
- Gennevilliers, France
- Piła, Poland
- Pula, Croatia
- Weinheim, Germany

Imperia

- Friedrichshafen, Germany
- Newport, United States
- Rosario, Argentina

Iseo

- Tamsweg, Austria

== J ==
Jesi

- Mayenne, France
- Waiblingen, Germany

== L ==
Lainate

- Rosice, Czech Republic
- Strenči, Latvia

Lanciano

- Berazategui, Argentina
- Qala, Malta
- Vaughan, Canada
- Visegrád, Hungary

Langhirano

- Cavaillon, France
- Espalion, France
- Nove, Italy
- Tauste, Spain

Latina

- Farroupilha, Brazil
- Nova Gorica, Slovenia
- Palos de la Frontera, Spain

Lecce

- Benevento, Italy
- Murcia, Spain
- Ostrów Wielkopolski, Poland
- Skopje, North Macedonia
- Valladolid, Spain

Lecco

- Igualada, Spain
- Mâcon, France
- Mytishchi, Russia
- Overijse, Belgium
- Szombathely, Hungary

Ledro

- Buštěhrad, Czech Republic
- Chyňava, Czech Republic
- Doksy, Czech Republic
- Milín, Czech Republic
- Nový Knín, Czech Republic
- Příbram, Czech Republic
- Ptice, Czech Republic
- Všeň, Czech Republic

Livorno

- Bat Yam, Israel
- Guadalajara, Spain
- Haiphong, Vietnam
- Novorossiysk, Russia
- Oakland, United States

Longano

- Bridgeport, United States

Lucca

- Abingdon-on-Thames, England, United Kingdom
- Colmar, France
- Schongau, Germany
- Sint-Niklaas, Belgium
- South San Francisco, United States

Lugo

- Agustín Codazzi, Colombia
- Choisy-le-Roi, France
- Kulmbach, Germany
- Nervesa della Battaglia, Italy
- (Republic of Ireland) Wexford, Ireland
- Yokneam Illit, Israel

== M ==
=== Ma–Me ===
Macerata

- Issy-les-Moulineaux, France
- Floriana, Malta
- Kamëz, Albania
- Weiden in der Oberpfalz, Germany

Mantua

- Charleville-Mézières, France
- Madison, United States
- Nevers, France
- Ōmihachiman, Japan
- Oradea, Romania
- Pushkin, Russia
- Weingarten, Germany

Marino

- Boulogne-Billancourt, France
- Irving, United States
- Neukölln (Berlin), Germany

Marostica

- Kronstadt, Russia
- Montigny-le-Bretonneux, France
- São Bernardo do Campo, Brazil
- Tendō, Japan

Marsciano

- Jablonec nad Nisou, Czech Republic
- Loropéni, Burkina Faso
- Orosei, Italy
- Tremblay-en-France, France

Massa

- Bad Kissingen, Germany
- Vernon, France

Matera

- Gáldar, Spain
- Mashhad, Iran
- Oulu, Finland
- Petra, Jordan
- Toms River, United States

Medicina

- Romilly-sur-Seine, France
- Škofja Loka, Slovenia

Merano

- Pardubice, Czech Republic
- Salzburg, Austria

Messina

- Kronstadt, Russia
- Messini, Greece

=== Mi–Mo ===
Milan

- Bethlehem, Palestine
- Birmingham, England, United Kingdom
- Chicago, United States
- Daegu, South Korea
- Dakar, Senegal
- Frankfurt am Main, Germany
- Kraków, Poland
- Lyon, France
- Melbourne, Australia
- Osaka, Japan
- Saint Petersburg, Russia
- São Paulo, Brazil
- Shanghai, China
- Tel Aviv, Israel
- Toronto, Canada

Mira

- Leibnitz, Austria

Mirandola

- Ostfildern, Germany
- Villejuif, France

Modena

- Almaty, Kazakhstan
- Benxi, China
- Highland Park, United States
- Linz, Austria
- Londrina, Brazil
- Novi Sad, Serbia
- Saint Paul, United States

Moena

- Kirkwall, Scotland, United Kingdom

Molfetta

- Fremantle, Australia
- Görlitz, Germany

Monopoli

- Lugoj, Romania
- Lyss, Switzerland

Monreale

- San Ġwann, Malta

Monselice

- Niepołomice, Poland
- Parkano, Finland
- Poreč, Croatia

Monsummano Terme

- Décines-Charpieu, France

Montebelluna

- Chișineu-Criș, Romania
- Dammarie-lès-Lys, France
- Eppelheim, Germany
- Kocs, Hungary
- Oberkochen, Germany
- Tata, Hungary

Montecarlo

- Althen-des-Paluds, France
- Karlštejn, Czech Republic
- Reichenbach im Vogtland, Germany

Montecchio Maggiore

- Alton, England, United Kingdom
- Passau, Germany

Montegrotto Terme

- Alajuela, Costa Rica
- Băile Herculane, Romania
- Berettyóújfalu, Hungary
- Bordano, Italy
- Mason City, United States
- Mostar, Bosnia and Herzegovina
- Termas de Río Hondo, Argentina

Montesarchio

- Bethlehem, Palestine
- La Garde, France

Montesilvano

- Gradiška, Bosnia and Herzegovina
- Hajdúböszörmény, Hungary
- Trogir, Croatia

Montespertoli

- Caronia, Italy
- Épernay, France
- Neustadt an der Aisch, Germany
- Santo Stefano di Cadore, Italy

Montevarchi

- Bethlehem, Palestine
- Bir Lehlou, Western Sahara
- Kitzingen, Germany
- Roanne, France

Monza

- Indianapolis, United States
- Prague 1 (Prague), Czech Republic

== N ==
Naples

- Baku, Azerbaijan
- Gafsa, Tunisia
- Kagoshima, Japan
- Marseille, France
- Nablus, Palestine
- Nosy Be, Madagascar
- Palma de Mallorca, Spain
- Santiago de Cuba, Cuba

Nardò

- Atlit (Hof HaCarmel), Israel
- Atri, Italy
- Conversano, Italy
- Fiorano Modenese, Italy
- Gyumri, Armenia
- Zitsa, Greece

Nettuno

- (Republic of Ireland) Ardee, Ireland
- Bandol, France
- Traunreut, Germany
- Wehr, Germany

Nichelino

- Caluire-et-Cuire, France
- Victoria, Malta

Noceto

- Cricova, Moldova
- Noyers, France
- Walnut Creek, United States

Nonantola

- Les Mureaux, France
- Olesa de Montserrat, Spain

Novara

- Chalon-sur-Saône, France
- Koblenz, Germany

Novellara

- Neve Shalom (Mateh Yehuda), Israel
- Nový Jičín, Czech Republic
- Sancti Spíritus, Cuba
- Santa Gertrudes, Brazil
- Santo Stefano di Cadore, Italy

== O ==
Ozzano dell'Emilia

- Staffanstorp, Sweden

== P ==
=== Pa–Pe ===
Padua

- Beira, Mozambique
- Boston, United States
- Coimbra, Portugal
- Freiburg im Breisgau, Germany
- Handan, China
- Iaşi, Romania
- Nancy, France
- Oxford, England, United Kingdom
- Zadar, Croatia

Palazzolo Acreide

- Sikyona, Greece

Palermo

- Bethlehem, Palestine
- Bizerte, Tunisia
- Bukavu, Democratic Republic of the Congo
- Chengdu, China
- Düsseldorf, Germany
- Grand-Bassam, Ivory Coast
- Hanoi, Vietnam
- Khan Yunis, Palestine
- Miami, United States
- Montpellier, France
- Palermo, Colombia
- Samara, Russia
- Santiago de Cuba, Cuba
- Sestu, Italy
- (Georgia (country)) Tbilisi, Georgia
- Timișoara, Romania
- Valletta, Malta
- Yaroslavl, Russia

Parabiago

- Samobor, Croatia

Parma

- Bourg-en-Bresse, France
- Corfu, Greece
- Ljubljana, Slovenia
- Shijiazhuang, China
- Stockton, United States
- Szeged, Hungary
- Tours, France
- Worms, Germany

Pavia

- Ayamé, Ivory Coast
- Besançon, France
- Bethlehem, Palestine
- Hersbruck, Germany
- Hildesheim, Germany
- Vilnius, Lithuania
- Zakynthos, Greece

Pavia di Udine

- Finkenstein am Faaker See, Austria

Pergine Valsugana

- Amstetten, Austria

Perugia

- Aix-en-Provence, France
- Bratislava, Slovakia
- Grand Rapids, United States
- Potsdam, Germany
- Seattle, United States
- Tübingen, Germany

Pesaro

- Kakegawa, Japan
- Keita, Niger
- Ljubljana, Slovenia
- Nanterre, France
- Qinhuangdao, China
- Rafah, Palestine
- Reșița, Romania
- Watford, England, United Kingdom

Pescantina

- Siedlce, Poland

Pesche

- Woodstock, Canada

Pescia

- Nerja, Spain
- Oullins, France

=== Pi–Pr ===
Piacenza

- Jajce, Bosnia and Herzegovina
- Plasencia, Spain
- Strumica, North Macedonia
- Tolyatti, Russia

Pietrasanta

- Écaussinnes, Belgium
- Grenzach-Wyhlen, Germany
- Montgomery, United States
- Villeparisis, France
- Zduńska Wola, Poland

Pinerolo

- Derventa, Bosnia and Herzegovina
- Gap, France
- San Francisco, Argentina
- Traunstein, Germany

Pisa

- Acre, Israel
- Akademgorodok (Novosibirsk), Russia
- Angers, France
- Hangzhou, China
- Iglesias, Italy
- Kolding, Denmark
- Niles, United States
- Ocala, United States
- Rhodes, Greece
- Santiago de Compostela, Spain
- Unna, Germany
- Valletta, Malta

Pistoia

- Kruševac, Serbia
- Pau, France
- Zittau, Germany

Poggibonsi

- Marcq-en-Barœul, France
- Werne, Germany

Pomezia

- Çanakkale, Turkey
- Itápolis, Brazil
- Singen, Germany

Pompei

- Gyeongju, South Korea
- Latiano, Italy
- Noto, Italy
- Tarragona, Spain
- Xi'an, China

Ponsacco

- Brignais, France
- Treuchtlingen, Germany

Pontassieve

- Griesheim, Germany
- Saint-Genis-Laval, France
- Znojmo, Czech Republic

Ponte San Nicolò

- Crest, France
- Dobra, Poland

Porcia

- Berettyóújfalu, Hungary
- Spittal an der Drau, Austria

Pordenone

- Ōkawa, Japan
- Poprad, Slovakia
- Spittal an der Drau, Austria

Porto Ceresio

- Augustów, Poland

Prato

- Albemarle County, United States
- Bir Lehlou, Western Sahara
- Changzhou, China
- Ebensee am Traunsee, Austria
- Nam Định, Vietnam
- Roubaix, France
- Sarajevo, Bosnia and Herzegovina
- Wangen im Allgäu, Germany

== Q ==
Quartu Sant'Elena

- Los Alcarrizos, Dominican Republic

== R ==
Racalmuto

- Hamilton, Canada

Ragusa

- Dubrovnik, Croatia
- Mosta, Malta
- Rădăuți, Romania

Ravenna

- Chartres, France
- Chichester, England, United Kingdom
- Speyer, Germany

Reggio Emilia

- Beit Jala, Palestine
- Bydgoszcz, Poland
- Chișinău, Moldova
- Dijon, France
- Fort Worth, United States
- Girona, Spain
- Kragujevac, Serbia
- Pemba, Mozambique
- Polokwane, South Africa
- Schwerin, Germany
- Zadar, Croatia

Rieti

- Itō, Japan
- Nordhorn, Germany
- Saint-Pierre-lès-Elbeuf, France

Rimini

- Fort Lauderdale, United States
- Saint-Maur-des-Fossés, France
- Seraing, Belgium
- Sochi, Russia
- Yangzhou, China
- Ziguinchor, Senegal

Rivoli

- Kranj, Slovenia
- Mollet del Vallès, Spain
- Montélimar, France
- Ravensburg, Germany

Rome

- Paris, France

Ronchi dei Legionari

- Metlika, Slovenia
- Wagna, Austria

Rovereto

- Bento Gonçalves, Brazil
- Dolní Dobrouč, Czech Republic
- Forchheim, Germany
- Kufstein, Austria
- Zabrze, Poland

Rovigo

- Bedford, England, United Kingdom
- Tulcea, Romania
- Viernheim, Germany

== S ==
=== Sa ===
Sabaudia

- Saint-Médard-en-Jalles, France
- El Vendrell, Spain

Salerno

- Legnago, Italy
- Pazardzhik, Bulgaria
- Rouen, France
- Tōno, Japan

Salsomaggiore Terme

- Baikonur, Kazakhstan
- Hammam-Lif, Tunisia
- Luxeuil-les-Bains, France
- Yalta, Ukraine

Salzano

- Villefontaine, France

San Benedetto del Tronto

- Alfortville, France
- Chicago Heights, United States
- Mar del Plata, Argentina
- Šibenik, Croatia
- Steyr, Austria
- Trinidad, Cuba
- Viareggio, Italy

San Casciano in Val di Pesa

- Al Mahbes, Western Sahara
- Morgan Hill, United States
- Nieuwerkerken, Belgium
- Rosh Pinna, Israel

San Donà di Piave

- Villeneuve-sur-Lot, France

San Giuliano Milanese

- Bussy-Saint-Georges, France
- Curtea de Argeş, Romania

San Giuliano Terme

- Bad Tölz, Germany
- Vichy, France

San Giustino

- Carros, France
- Prudnik, Poland

San Miniato

- Apolda, Germany
- Bethlehem, Palestine
- Silly, Belgium
- Villeneuve-lès-Avignon, France

San Pietro in Cariano

- Ingelheim am Rhein, Germany
- Ludlow, England, United Kingdom
- Stans, Austria

San Vito al Tagliamento

- Nagyatád, Hungary
- Rixheim, France
- Sankt Veit an der Glan, Austria
- Stadtlohn, Germany

Sanremo

- Atami, Japan
- Helsingør, Denmark
- Karlskoga, Sweden

Santa Maria a Vico

- Caspe, Spain
- Gaillac, France

Santa Teresa di Riva

- Fuveau, France

Savona

- Bayamo, Cuba
- Mariupol, Ukraine
- Saona, Dominican Republic
- Villingen-Schwenningen, Germany

=== Sc–Se ===
Scandiano

- Almansa, Spain
- Blansko, Czech Republic
- Tubize, Belgium

Scandicci

- Pantin, France

Schio

- Kaposvár, Hungary
- Landshut, Germany
- Pétange, Luxembourg

Segrate

- Poreč, Croatia
- Sonsonate, El Salvador

Senigallia

- Chester, England, United Kingdom
- Lörrach, Germany
- Sens, France

Sesto Fiorentino

- Bagnolet, France
- Al Mahbes, Western Sahara
- Stefanaconi, Italy
- Wieliczka, Poland

Sesto San Giovanni

- Saint-Denis, France
- Zlín, Czech Republic

Sestri Levante

- Dole, France
- Santa Cruz, United States

=== Si–Sy ===
Siena

- Avignon, France
- Buffalo, United States
- Concord, United States
- Weimar, Germany
- Wetzlar, Germany

Signa

- Maromme, France
- Oberdrauburg, Austria
- Pukë, Albania

Solarino

- Merri-bek, Australia
- New Britain, United States

Sona

- Soyaux, France
- Wadowice, Poland
- Weiler bei Bingen, Germany

Sondrio

- Radovljica, Slovenia
- São Mateus, Brazil
- Sindelfingen, Germany

Sora

- Vaughan, Canada

Sorrento

- Eilat, Israel
- Gangneung, South Korea
- Kumano, Japan
- Mar del Plata, Argentina
- Nice, France
- San Martino Valle Caudina, Italy
- Santa Fe, United States
- Skien, Norway
- Taurasi, Italy

La Spezia

- Bayreuth, Germany
- Toulon, France
- Zhuhai, China

Spilimbergo

- La Châtre, France
- Sachsenburg, Austria

Spoleto

- Cajamarca, Peru
- Cetinje, Montenegro
- Charleston, United States
- Orange, France
- Schwetzingen, Germany

Sulmona

- Burghausen, Germany
- Constanța, Romania
- Hamilton, Canada
- Ovidiu, Romania
- Serravalle, San Marino
- Šumperk, Czech Republic
- (Greece) Zakynthos, Grece

Syracuse

- Würzburg, Germany

== T ==
Taormina

- Abadan, Iran
- Contrexéville, France
- Sunny Isles Beach, United States
- Swieqi, Malta

Taranto

- Brest, France
- Donetsk, Ukraine
- Sparta, Greece

Tarcento

- Arnoldstein, Austria
- Bovec, Slovenia
- Unterföhring, Germany

Tavullia

- Vernon, Canada

Teramo

- Aglandjia, Cyprus
- Ávila, Spain
- Berane, Montenegro
- Gorzów Wielkopolski, Poland
- Memmingen, Germany
- Prague 7 (Prague), Czech Republic
- Ribeirão Preto, Brazil
- Rishon LeZion, Israel
- Strovolos, Cyprus

Termoli

- Chorzów, Poland
- Pompano Beach, United States

Terni

- Cartagena, Spain
- Dunaújváros, Hungary
- Saint-Ouen-sur-Seine, France

Terracina

- Bad Homburg vor der Höhe, Germany
- Cabourg, France
- Chur, Switzerland
- Exeter, England, United Kingdom
- Jūrmala, Latvia
- Mayrhofen, Austria
- Mondorf-les-Bains, Luxembourg
- Pécs, Hungary

Thiene

- Apt, France

Tolfa

- Biograd na Moru, Croatia
- (Republic of Ireland) Dingle, Ireland
- Għajnsielem, Malta
- Slovenske Konjice, Slovenia

Torremaggiore

- Buffalo, United States
- Canosa di Puglia, Italy
- Villafalletto, Italy

Tremosine sul Garda

- North Adams, United States

Trento

- Charlottenburg-Wilmersdorf (Berlin), Germany
- Kempten, Germany
- Prague 1 (Prague), Czech Republic
- San Sebastián, Spain

Trieste

- Graz, Austria
- Mykolaiv, Ukraine
- Santos, Brazil
- Southampton, England, United Kingdom

Turin

- Chambéry, France
- Cologne, Germany
- Córdoba, Argentina
- Detroit, United States
- Esch-sur-Alzette, Luxembourg
- Gaza City, Palestine
- Glasgow, Scotland, United Kingdom
- Liège, Belgium
- Lille, France
- Nagoya, Japan
- Quetzaltenango, Guatemala
- Rosario, Argentina
- Rotterdam, Netherlands
- Salt Lake City, United States
- Shenyang, China

== U ==
Udine

- Albacete, Spain
- Esslingen am Neckar, Germany
- Maribor, Slovenia
- Neath Port Talbot, Wales, United Kingdom
- Schiedam, Netherlands
- Tarnów, Poland
- Vienne, France
- Villach, Austria
- Windsor, Canada
- Yaoundé, Cameroon

== V ==
Varedo

- Champagnole, France

Varese

- Alba Iulia, Romania
- Romans-sur-Isère, France

Velletri

- Esch-sur-Alzette, Luxembourg
- Mödling, Austria
- Offenbach am Main, Germany
- Puteaux, France
- Zemun (Belgrade), Serbia

Venice

- Dubrovnik, Croatia
- Istanbul, Turkey
- Saint Petersburg, Russia
- Sarajevo, Bosnia and Herzegovina
- Suzhou, China
- Tallinn, Estonia
- Yerevan, Armenia

Verbania

- Bethlehem, Palestine
- Bourg-de-Péage, France
- Crikvenica, Croatia
- East Grinstead, England, United Kingdom
- Mindelheim, Germany
- Piatra Neamț, Romania
- Sant Feliu de Guíxols, Spain
- Schwaz, Austria

Vercelli

- Arles, France
- Tortosa, Spain

Verona

- Albany, New York, United States
- Johannesburg, South Africa
- Munich, Germany
- Nagahama, Japan
- Nîmes, France
- Pula, Croatia
- Saint-Josse-ten-Noode, Belgium
- Salzburg, Austria

Vicenza

- Annecy, France
- Bethlehem, Palestine
- Cleveland, Ohio, United States
- Guiyang, China
- Osijek, Croatia
- Pforzheim, Germany
- Zhytomyr, Ukraine

== Z ==
Zanè

- Pag, Croatia
