= Chrustenice =

- Municipality
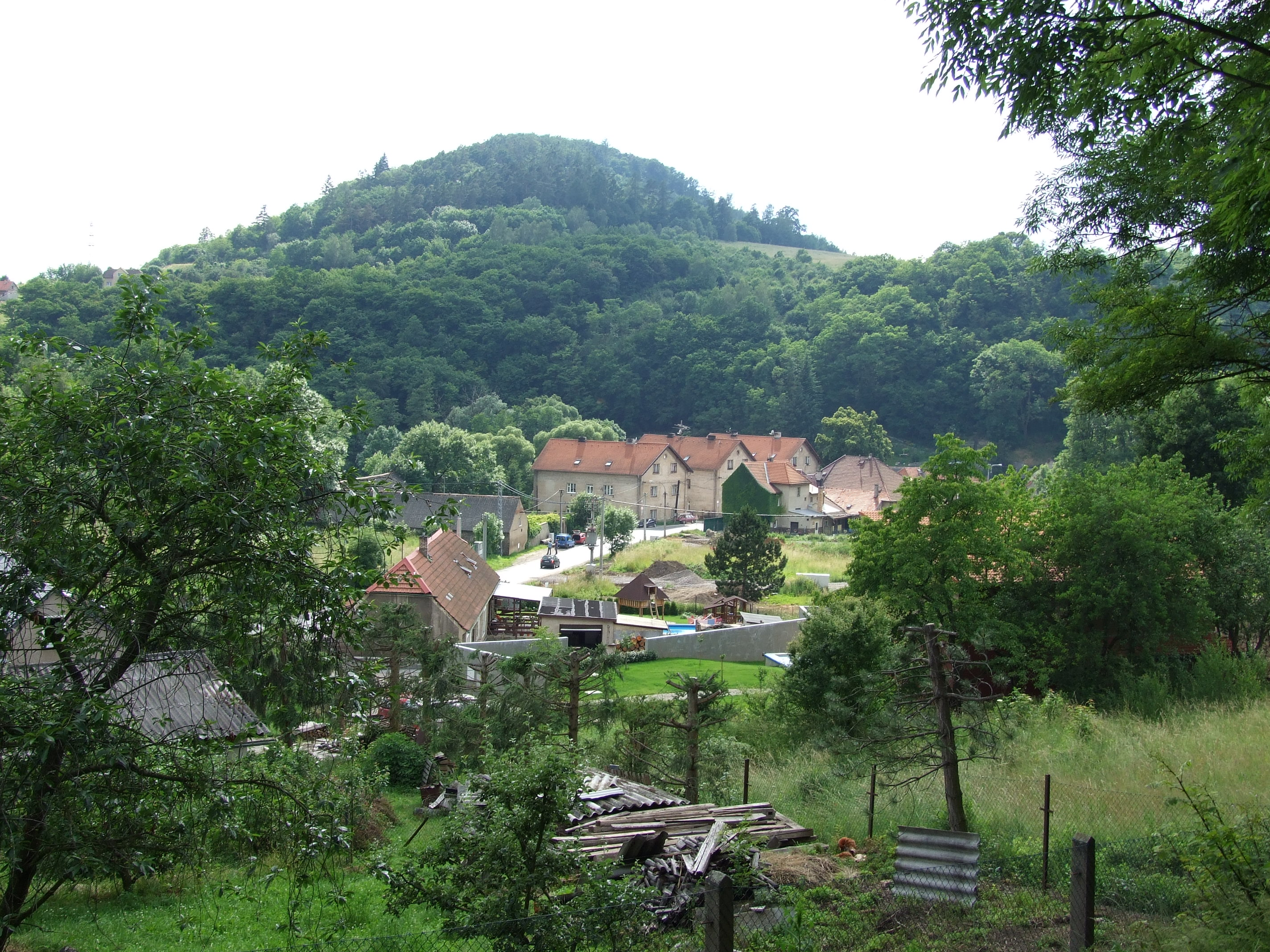
- Hřeben hill in Chrustenice

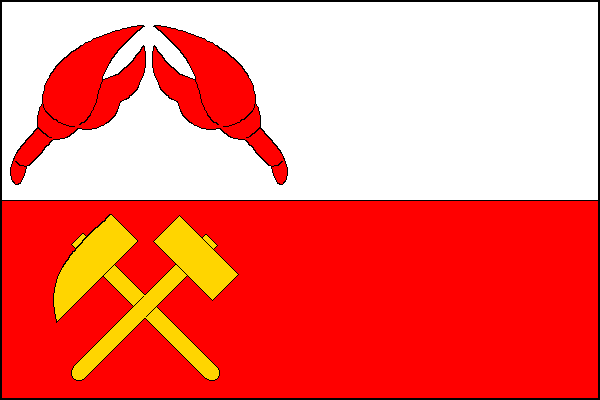
- Flag Coat of arms

- Location in the Czech Republic
- Coordinates: 50°0′22″N 14°9′8″E
- Country: Czech Republic
- Region: Central Bohemian
- District: Beroun
- First mentioned: 1037

Area
  - Total: 6.73 km^{2} (2.60 sq mi)
- Elevation: 275 m (902 ft)

Population (2026-01-01)
  - Total: 1,078
  - Density: 160/km^{2} (415/sq mi)
- Time zone: UTC+1 (CET)
  - Summer (DST): UTC+2 (CEST)
- Postal code: 267 12
- Website: www.chrustenice.cz

Chrustenice is a municipality and village in Beroun District in the Central Bohemian Region of the Czech Republic. It has about 1,100 inhabitants.

== Etymology ==
The initial name of the village was Chrustěnice. The name was derived from the personal name Chrustěn, meaning "the village of Chrustěn's people".

== Geography ==
Chrustenice is located about 7 kilometres (4 mi) northeast of Beroun and 17 km (11 mi) southwest of Prague. It lies in the Křivoklát Highlands. The highest point is the hill Hřeben at 431 m (1,414 ft) above sea level. The Loděnice River flows through the municipality.

== History ==
The first written mention of Chrustenice is in a deed of Duke Bretislav I from 1037.

In 1907–1965, iron ore was mined in the municipality.

== Demographics ==
Historical population

Year	Pop.	±%
1869	278	—
1880	294	+5.8%
1890	480	+63.3%
1900	475	−1.0%
1910	491	+3.4%

Year	Pop.	±%
1921	581	+18.3%
1930	689	+18.6%
1950	568	−17.6%
1961	614	+8.1%
1970	593	−3.4%

Year	Pop.	±%
1980	644	+8.6%
1991	601	−6.7%
2001	632	+5.2%
2011	861	+36.2%
2021	1,074	+24.7%

Source: Censuses

== Transport ==
The D5 motorway from Prague to Plzeň briefly crosses the municipality in the west.

== Sights ==
There are no protected cultural monuments in the municipality.

A tourist destination is Chrustenická šachta ('Chrustenice shaft'). It is an exhibition of mining technology in the former iron ore mine.

== In popular culture ==
The former mine in Chrustenice is a popular film location. Among the TV series that were shot here are The Land Gone Wild (1996–2001) and Neviditelní (2014).
