= Svárov (Kladno District) =

- Municipality
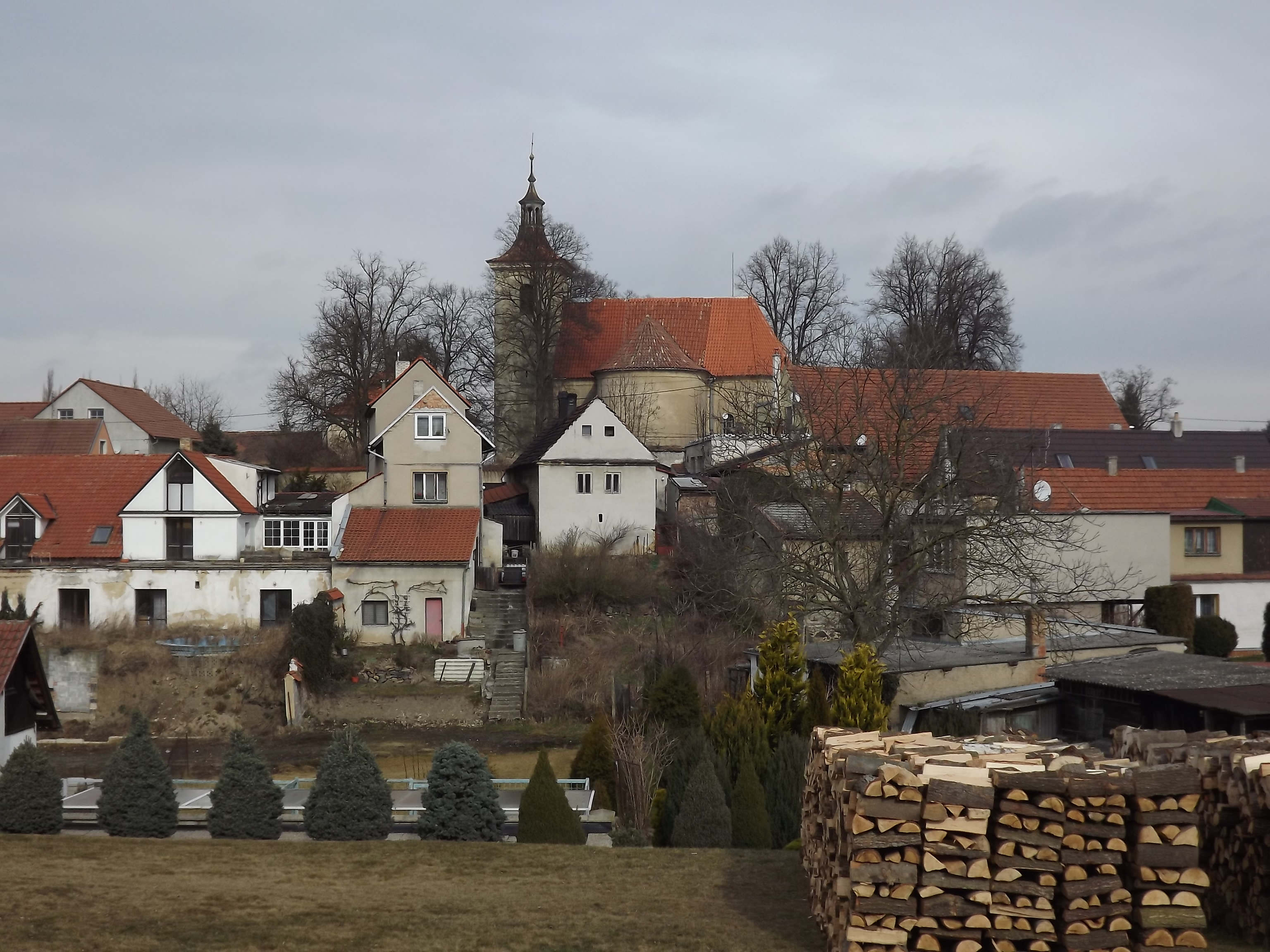
- Centre with the Church of Saint Lucas

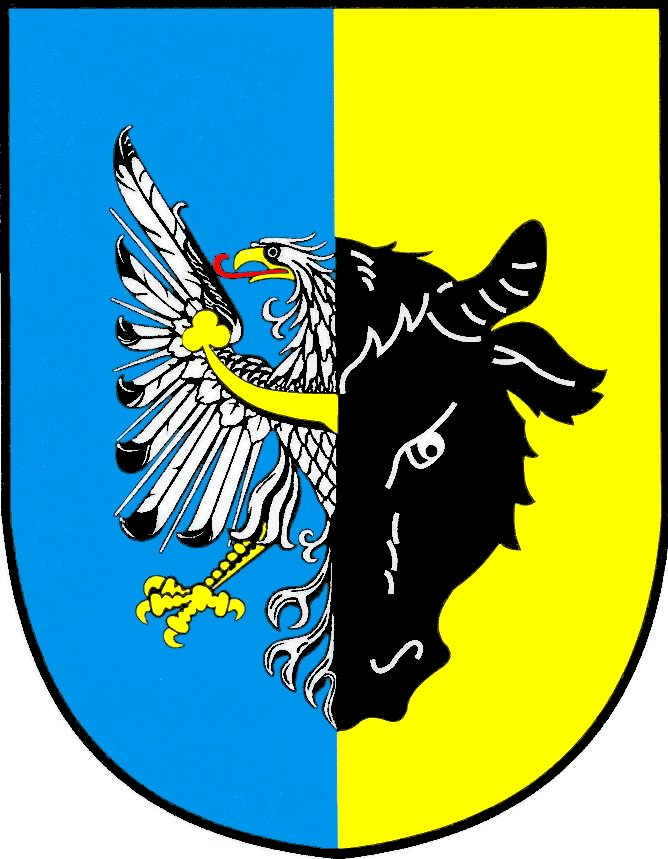
- Flag Coat of arms

- Location in the Czech Republic
- Coordinates: 50°3′43″N 14°9′2″E
- Country: Czech Republic
- Region: Central Bohemian
- District: Kladno
- First mentioned: 1249

Area
  - Total: 4.21 km^{2} (1.63 sq mi)
- Elevation: 380 m (1,250 ft)

Population (2026-01-01)
  - Total: 622
  - Density: 148/km^{2} (383/sq mi)
- Time zone: UTC+1 (CET)
  - Summer (DST): UTC+2 (CEST)
- Postal code: 273 51
- Website: www.svarov.eu

Svárov is a municipality and village in Kladno District in the Central Bohemian Region of the Czech Republic. It has about 600 inhabitants.

== Etymology ==
The name Svárov was derived from the personal name Svár, meaning "Svár's (property)".

== Geography ==
Svárov is located about 8 kilometres (5 mi) south of Kladno and 12 km (7 mi) west of Prague. It lies in the Křivoklát Highlands. The Loděnice River briefly flows through the municipal territory. In the centre of the village is the fishpond Svárovský rybník.

== History ==
The first written mention of Svárov is from 1249, when it was owned by the Břevnov Monastery. It was owned by various lesser nobles for most of its history. From 1732 until the establishment of an independent municipality in 1850, the village was part of the Buštěhrad estate.

== Demographics ==
Historical population

Year	Pop.	±%
1869	294	—
1880	323	+9.9%
1890	319	−1.2%
1900	284	−11.0%
1910	343	+20.8%

Year	Pop.	±%
1921	312	−9.0%
1930	270	−13.5%
1950	252	−6.7%
1961	260	+3.2%
1970	274	+5.4%

Year	Pop.	±%
1980	207	−24.5%
1991	164	−20.8%
2001	195	+18.9%
2011	541	+177.4%
2021	602	+11.3%

Source: Censuses

== Transport ==
There are no railways or major roads passing through the municipality.

== Sights ==
The main landmark of Svárov is the Church of Saint Lucas. It was first documented in 1352, but it has a Romanesque core, which indicates an older origin. The church was probably extended in the late Renaissance period, then it was baroque rebuilt.
