= Kačice =

- Municipality
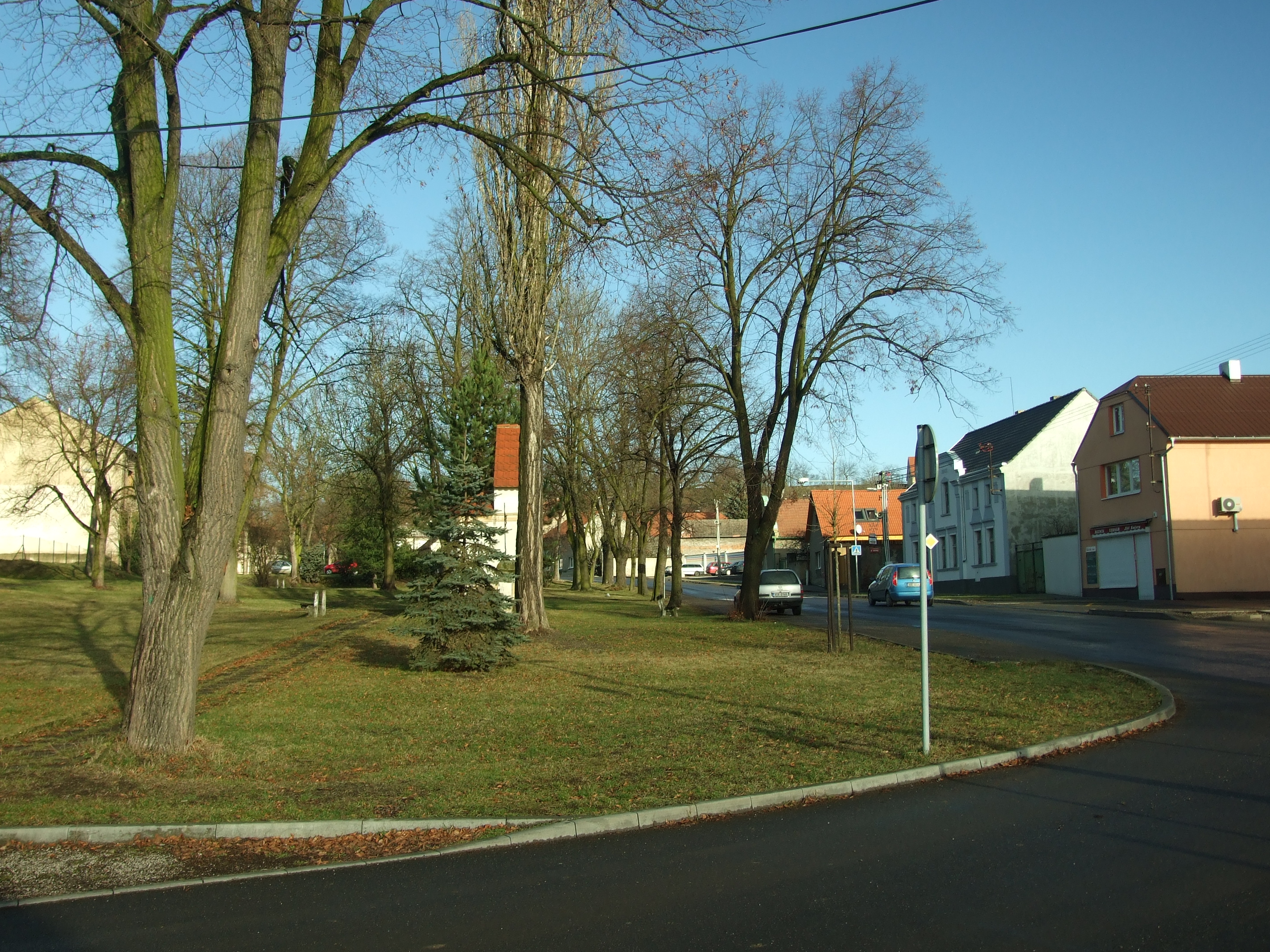
- Centre of Kačice

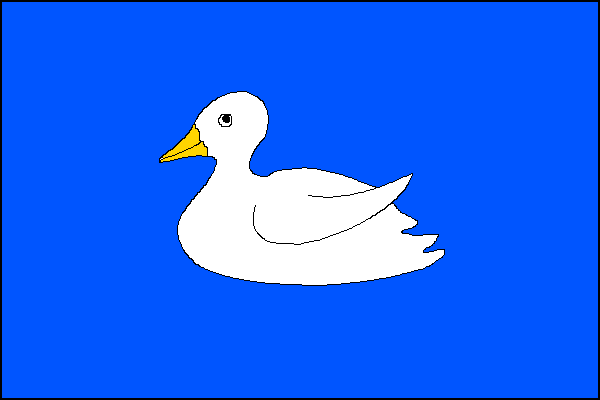
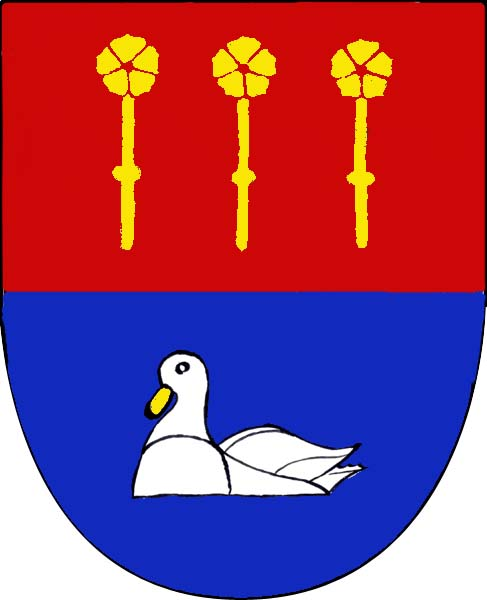
- Flag Coat of arms

- Location in the Czech Republic
- Coordinates: 50°9′46″N 13°59′18″E
- Country: Czech Republic
- Region: Central Bohemian
- District: Kladno
- First mentioned: 1318

Area
  - Total: 6.43 km^{2} (2.48 sq mi)
- Elevation: 388 m (1,273 ft)

Population (2026-01-01)
  - Total: 1,236
  - Density: 192/km^{2} (498/sq mi)
- Time zone: UTC+1 (CET)
  - Summer (DST): UTC+2 (CEST)
- Postal code: 273 04
- Website: www.kacice.cz

Kačice is a municipality and village in Kladno District in the Central Bohemian Region of the Czech Republic. It has about 1,200 inhabitants.

== Etymology ==
The surname of the first inhabitant of the village was probably Kačice and the village was named after him. The surname was derived from the feminine name Káča, Kačena (variation of the name Kateřina, Czech form of Catherine) or from the Old Czech word kačice ('duck').

== Geography ==
Kačice is located about 8 kilometres (5 mi) west of Kladno and 27 km (17 mi) northwest of Prague. It lies in the Džbán range. The highest point is at 435 m (1,427 ft) above sea level. The Loděnice River flows along the southwestern municipal border.

== History ==
The first written mention of Kačice is from 1318. Until 1550, it was owned by various lesser noblemen. In 1550–1551, both parts of Kačice were bought by the Martinic family and annexed to the Smečno estate.

== Demographics ==
Historical population

Year	Pop.	±%
1869	674	—
1880	684	+1.5%
1890	765	+11.8%
1900	809	+5.8%
1910	1,186	+46.6%

Year	Pop.	±%
1921	1,245	+5.0%
1930	1,250	+0.4%
1950	1,198	−4.2%
1961	1,279	+6.8%
1970	1,263	−1.3%

Year	Pop.	±%
1980	1,134	−10.2%
1991	1,037	−8.6%
2001	1,132	+9.2%
2011	1,244	+9.9%
2021	1,195	−3.9%

Source: Censuses

== Transport ==
The D6 motorway from Prague to Karlovy Vary runs south of the village, just outside the municipal territory.

Kačice is located on the railway line Kladno–Rakovník.

== Sights ==
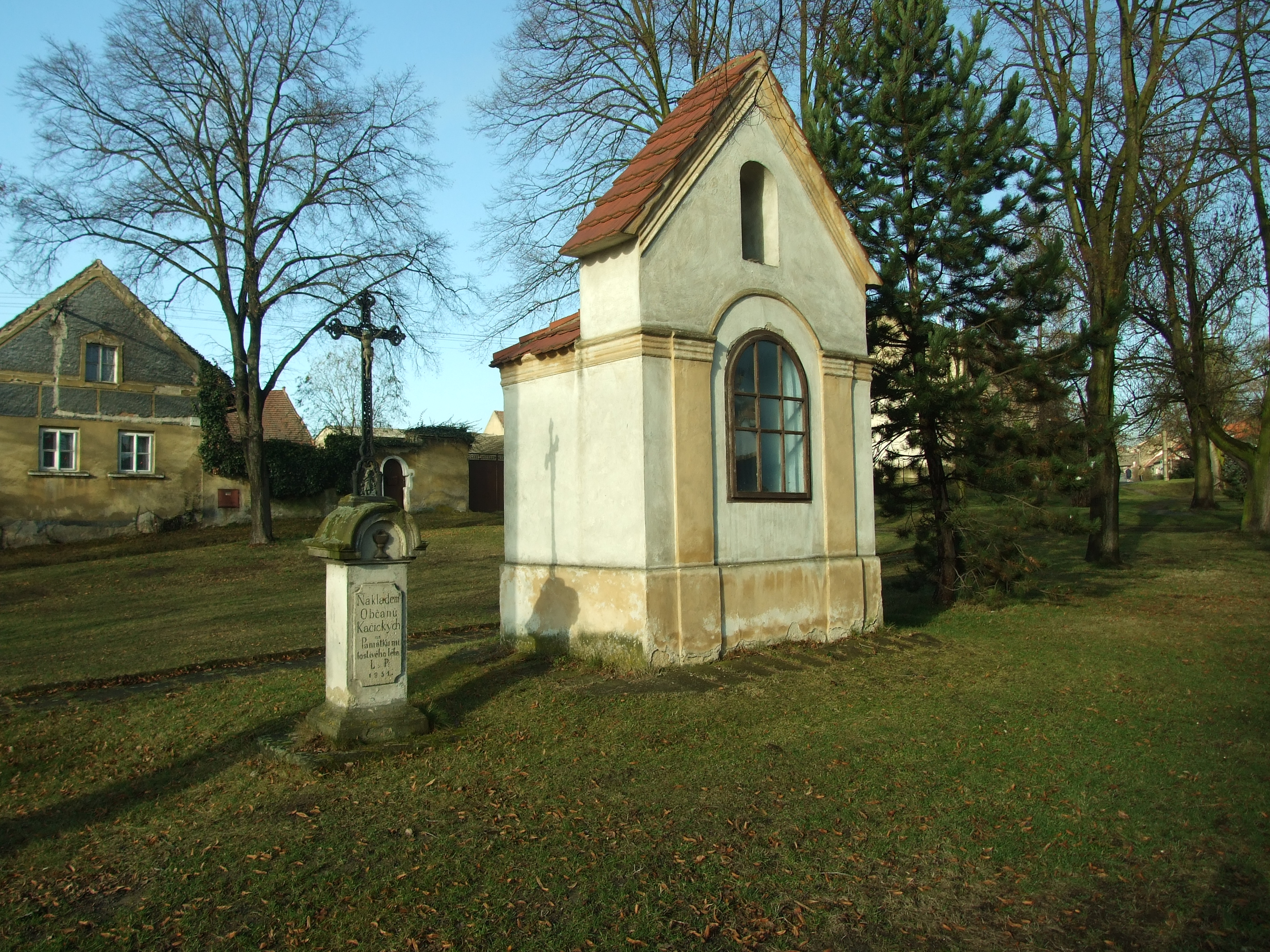
Chapel of Saint John of Nepomuk

The main landmark of Kačice is the Chapel of Saint John of Nepomuk. It is a small pseudo-Gothic niche chapel, dating from 1851. Next to the chapel is a cast iron cross. Other protected cultural monuments are a statue of a bishop from the first half of the 18th century and a rural homestead from the turn of the 18th and 19th centuries.
