= Svatý Jan pod Skalou =

- Municipality
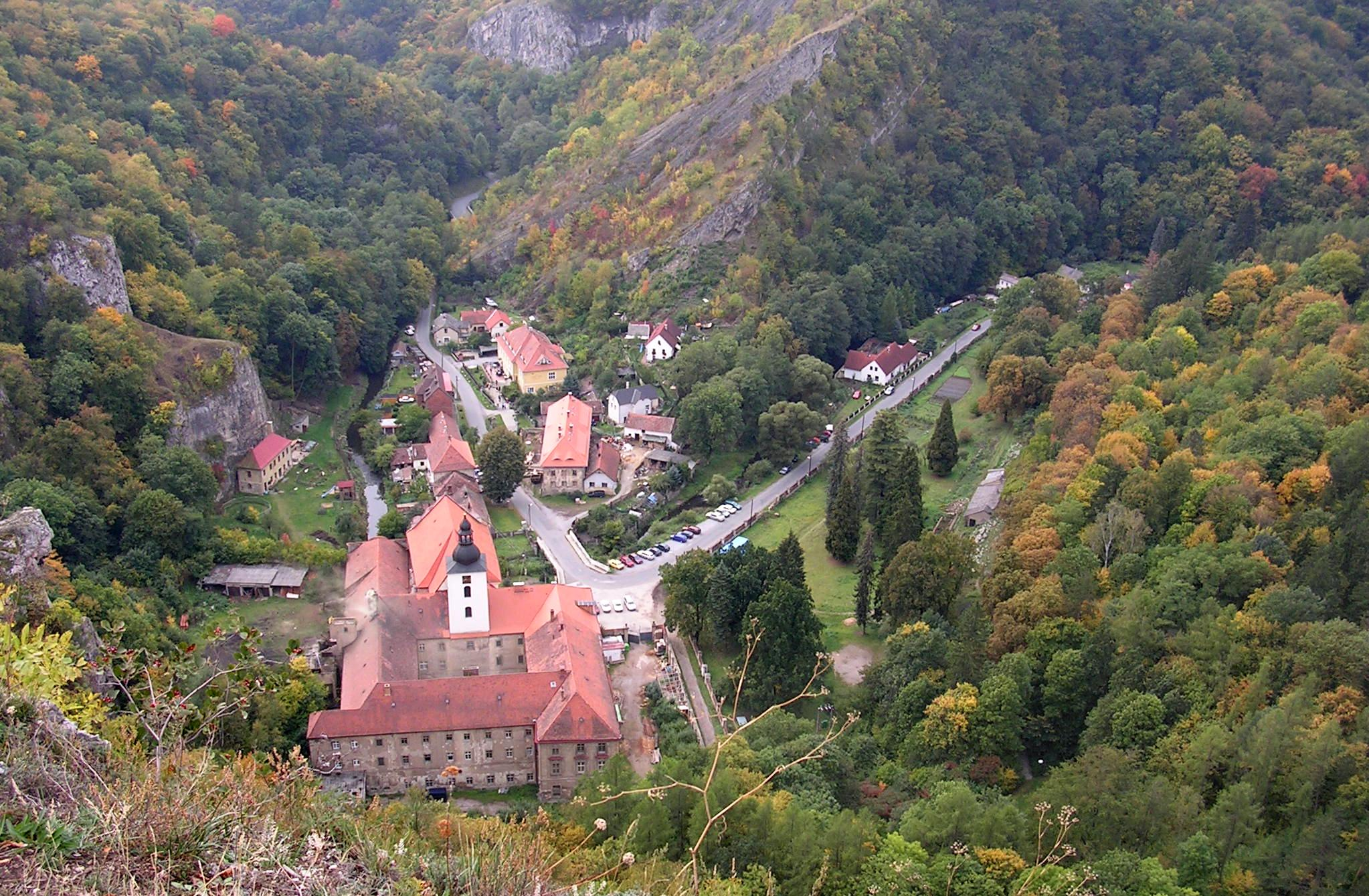
- General view of the village and the monastery

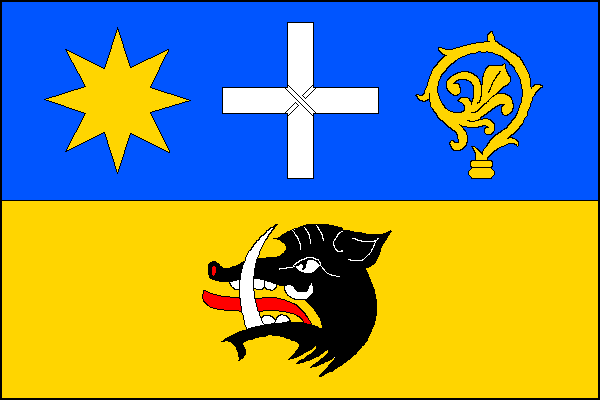
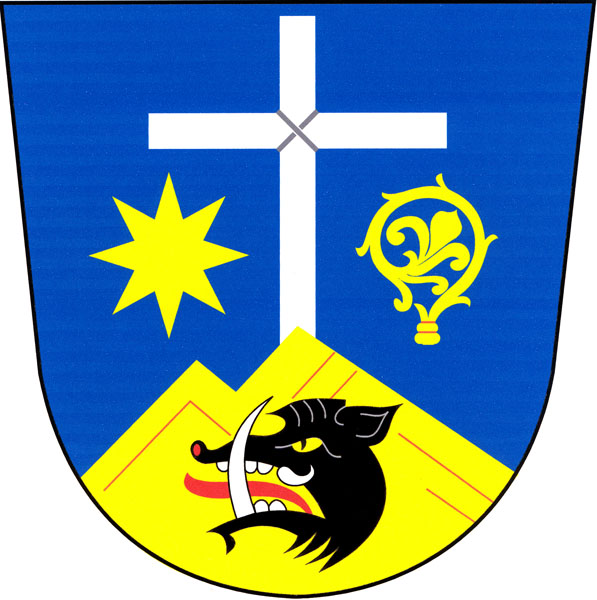
- Flag Coat of arms

- Location in the Czech Republic
- Coordinates: 49°58′8″N 14°8′0″E
- Country: Czech Republic
- Region: Central Bohemian
- District: Beroun
- First mentioned: 1037

Area
  - Total: 4.06 km^{2} (1.57 sq mi)
- Elevation: 233 m (764 ft)

Population (2026-01-01)
  - Total: 213
  - Density: 52.5/km^{2} (136/sq mi)
- Time zone: UTC+1 (CET)
  - Summer (DST): UTC+2 (CEST)
- Postal code: 266 01
- Website: www.svatyjan.cz

Svatý Jan pod Skalou (Czech pronunciation: [ˈsvatiː ˈjan ˈpot skalou]; German: St. Johann unter dem Felsen) is a municipality and village in Beroun District in the Central Bohemian Region of the Czech Republic. It has about 200 inhabitants. The municipality is located on the Loděnice River in the Hořovice Uplands.

Svatý Jan pod Skalou is known for a Baroque complex of the former local Benedictine monastery, protected as a national cultural monument.

== Administrative division ==
Svatý Jan pod Skalou consists of three municipal parts (in brackets population according to the 2021 census):

- Svatý Jan pod Skalou (73)
- Sedlec (54)
- Záhrabská (64)

== Etymology ==
The name Svatý Jan pod Skalou means 'Saint John under the Rock' in Czech. It refers to the legend associated with the establishment of the local church.

== Geography ==
Svatý Jan pod Skalou is located about 5 kilometres (3 mi) east of Beroun and 18 km (11 mi) southwest of Prague. It lies in a hilly landscape in the Hořovice Uplands. The highest point is the hill Herinky at 440 m (1,444 ft) above sea level. The village is situated in the valley of the Loděnice River. The entire municipality is located within the Bohemian Karst Protected Landscape Area; most of the municipal territory is also protected as the Karlštejn National Nature Reserve.

== History ==
According to legend, Ivan, who is considered the first Czech Christian hermit, settled in a cave under a rock in the area of Svatý Jan in the 9th century. When he was tempted by evil spirits, Saint John the Baptist appeared to him and helped him. Ivan then visited Duke Bořivoj I and revealed to him God's message that he should build a church with St. John the Baptist as his patron saint. After Ivan's death, Duke Bořivoj had the chapel built.

The first written mention of Svatý Jan is from 1037, when Ivan's cave with hermitage, grave and chapel was acquired by the Ostrov Monastery in Davle from Duke Bretislav I. In 1310, a provostship was established here, and the property of the monastery was significantly increased at this time. In 1420, the Ostrov monastery was captured and destroyed by the Hussites, and the monks moved to Svatý Jan, then called "Svatý Jan in the rocks". In 1517, the monks settled here permanently. In 1584, the remains of St. Ivan were rediscovered and picked up, and the tradition of pilgrimages began here.

In 1785, the monastery was abolished by the reform of Emperor Joseph II. The property of the monastery was then sold at auction and gradually owned by various nobles. Part of the monastery was used for industrial production, in 1904–1912 there was also a spa. In 1949, the monastery was seized by the state, which set up a forced labor camp here, and in 1951–1955 a prison. In 1994, the monastery buildings were returned to the church.

== Demographics ==
Historical population

Year	Pop.	±%
1869	399	—
1880	412	+3.3%
1890	405	−1.7%
1900	321	−20.7%
1910	219	−31.8%

Year	Pop.	±%
1921	338	+54.3%
1930	416	+23.1%
1950	469	+12.7%
1961	258	−45.0%
1970	169	−34.5%

Year	Pop.	±%
1980	131	−22.5%
1991	92	−29.8%
2001	111	+20.7%
2011	163	+46.8%
2021	191	+17.2%

Source: Censuses

== Transport ==
There are no railways or major roads passing through the municipality.

== Education ==
The premises of the former monastery now houses St. John College – Higher Vocational School of Pedagogy. It was founded in 1995.

== Sights ==
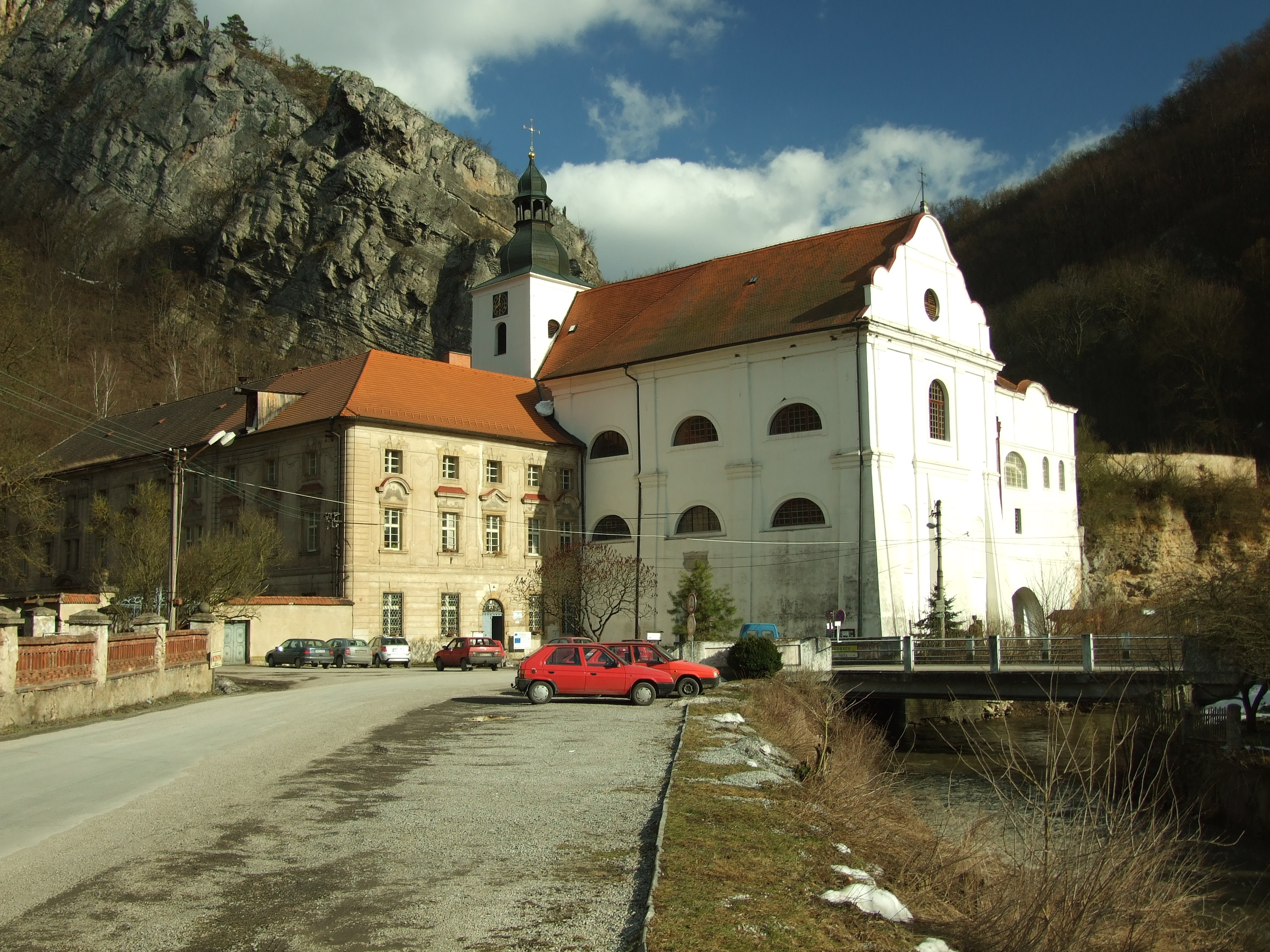
Monastery complex

The Baroque complex of the Benedictine monastery includes the Church of the Nativity of Saint John the Baptist, the rock church of the Virgin Mary and the cave and the spring of St. Ivan. In the second half of the 15th century, the Church of the Nativity of Saint John the Baptist was built next to the St. Ivan's cave. At the beginning of the 17th century, the church was expanded with a bell tower. The old church was then replaced by a new one built by Carlo Lurago in 1661, then it was reconstructed by Kilian Ignaz Dientzenhofer in 1710–1711. In the years 1728–1731, additional wings of the monastery were added under the leadership of Dientzenhofer. The baroque reconstruction of the monastery was completed by the construction of a library in 1764–1766. The monastery complex is one of the most important monuments in the region, protected as a national cultural monument.
