= Řevničov =

- Municipality
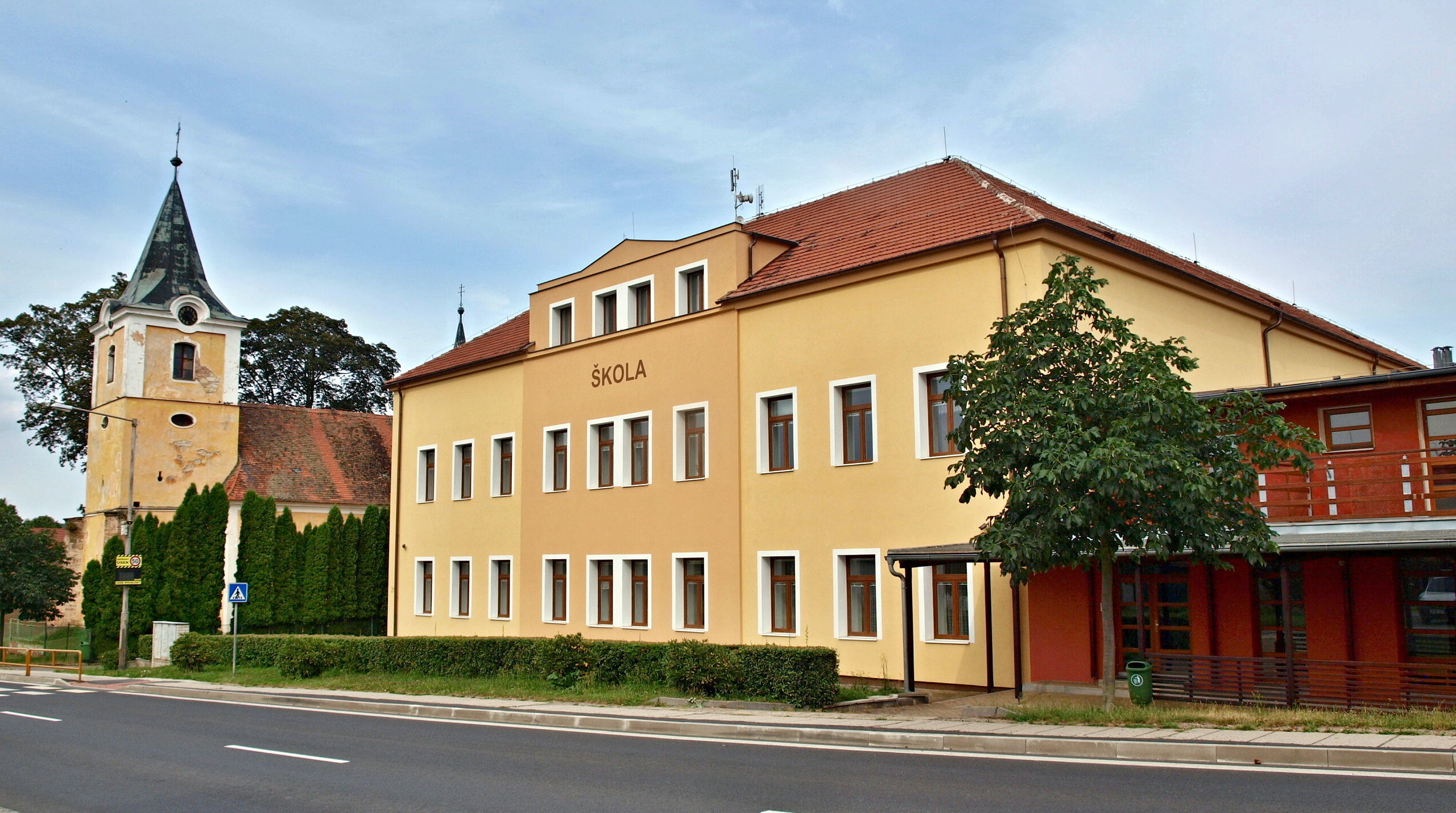
- School and Church of Saints Peter and Paul

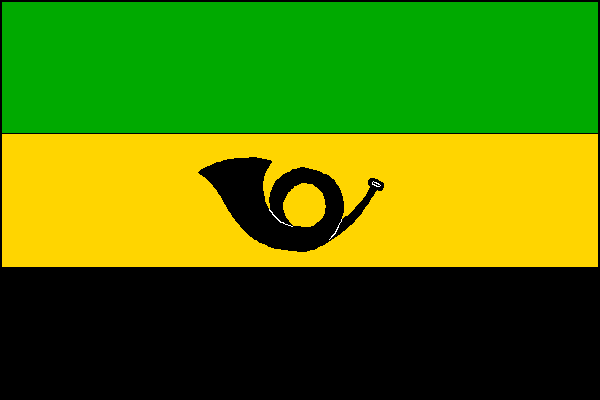
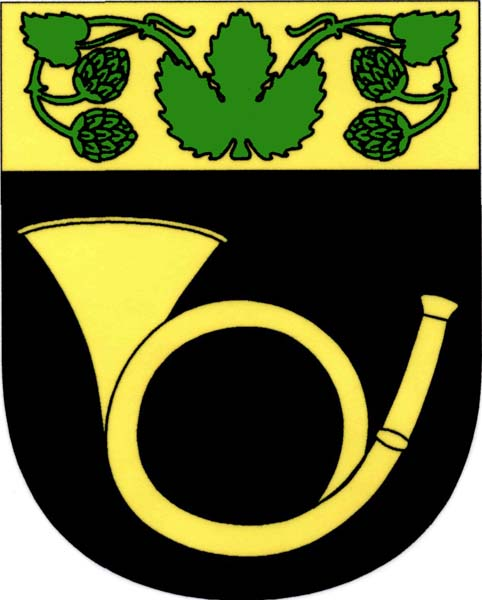
- Flag Coat of arms

- Location in the Czech Republic
- Coordinates: 50°11′6″N 13°48′30″E
- Country: Czech Republic
- Region: Central Bohemian
- District: Rakovník
- Founded: 1325

Area
  - Total: 29.23 km^{2} (11.29 sq mi)
- Elevation: 457 m (1,499 ft)

Population (2026-01-01)
  - Total: 1,537
  - Density: 52.58/km^{2} (136.2/sq mi)
- Time zone: UTC+1 (CET)
  - Summer (DST): UTC+2 (CEST)
- Postal code: 270 54
- Website: www.revnicov.cz

Řevničov is a municipality and village in Rakovník District in the Central Bohemian Region of the Czech Republic. It has about 1,500 inhabitants.

== Etymology ==
The name is derived from the personal name Řevnič, meaning "Řevnič's (court)".

== Geography ==
Řevničov is located about 10 kilometres (6 mi) northeast of Rakovník and 38 km (24 mi) west of Prague. It lies mostly in the Džbán range, only a small part of the municipal territory in the south extends into the Křivoklát Highlands and also belongs to the Křivoklátsko Protected Landscape Area. The highest point is the Louštín hill at 537 m (1,762 ft) above sea level. The Loděnice River originates in the municipal territory and flows across the municipality.

== History ==
Řevničov was founded by King John of Bohemia in 1325. The village was built at the crossroads of two trade routes.

== Demographics ==
Historical population

Year	Pop.	±%
1869	1,424	—
1880	1,587	+11.4%
1890	1,558	−1.8%
1900	1,641	+5.3%
1910	1,691	+3.0%

Year	Pop.	±%
1921	1,717	+1.5%
1930	1,704	−0.8%
1950	1,441	−15.4%
1961	1,522	+5.6%
1970	1,463	−3.9%

Year	Pop.	±%
1980	1,461	−0.1%
1991	1,441	−1.4%
2001	1,412	−2.0%
2011	1,407	−0.4%
2021	1,403	−0.3%

Source: Censuses

== Transport ==
The D6 motorway (part of the European route E48) from Prague to Karlovy Vary runs through the municipality.

Řevničov is located on the railway line Kladno–Rakovník. The train station is situated outside the built-up area.

== Sights ==
The main landmark of Řevničov is the Church of Saints Peter and Paul. The church was first documented in 1352. The Gothic building was rebuilt in the Baroque style, but kept its Gothic look.

== Notable people ==
- Josef Kadraba (1933–2019), footballer
