= Družec =

- Municipality
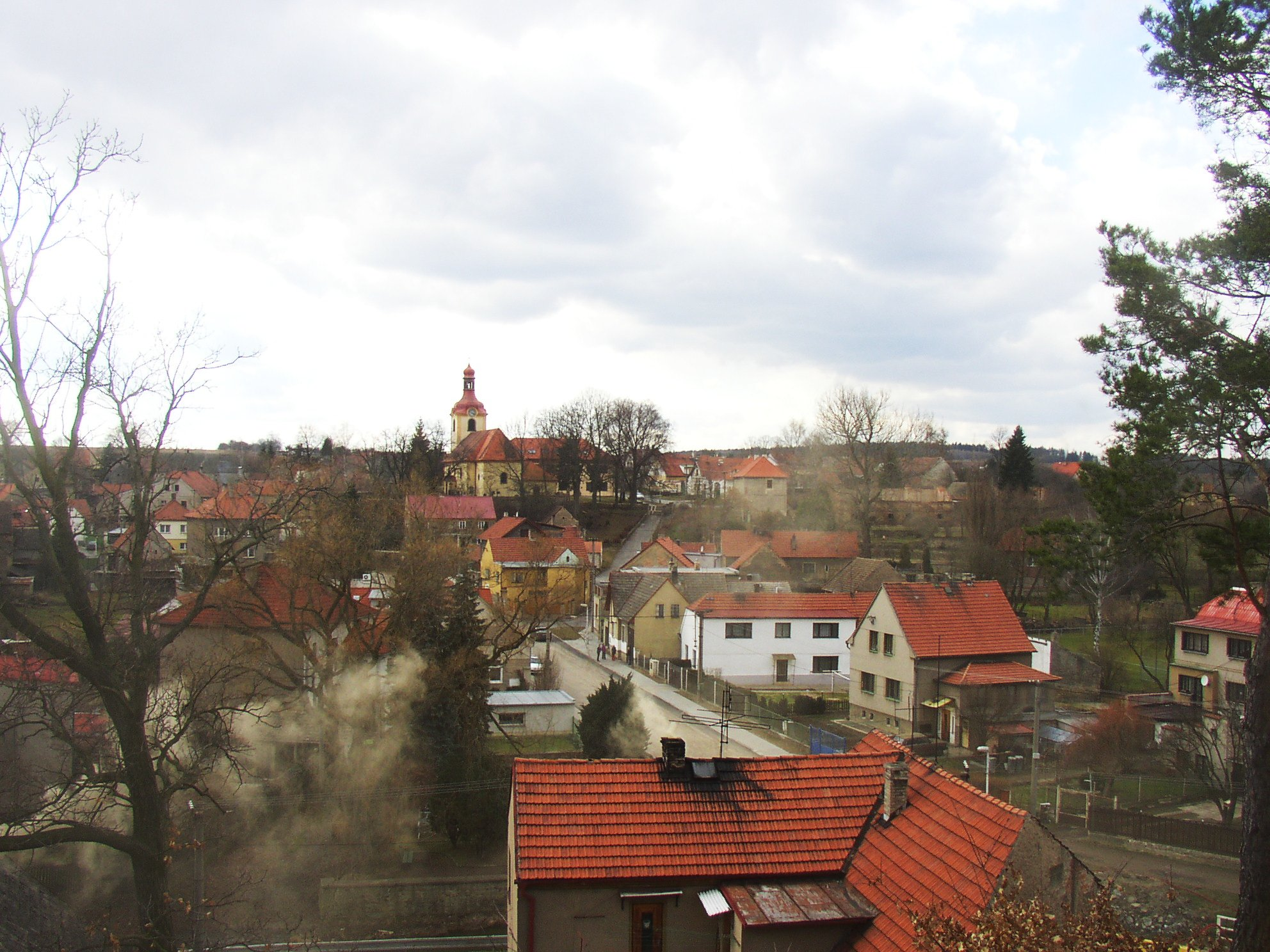
- Družec from the Calvary Rock

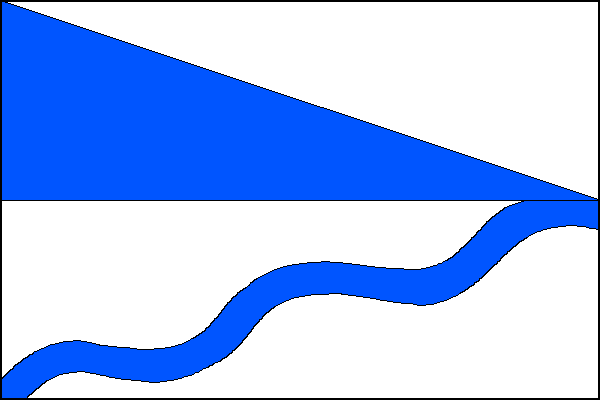
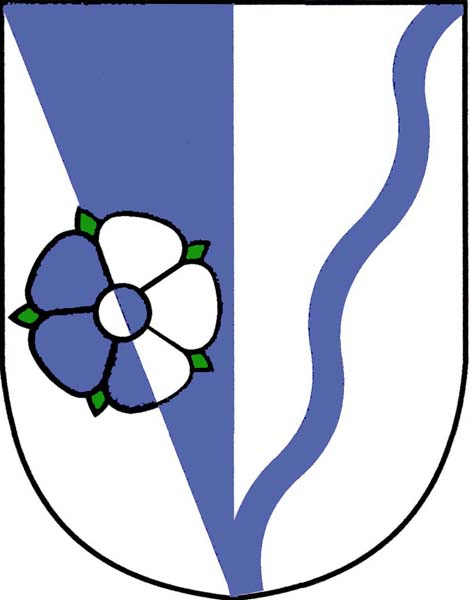
- Flag Coat of arms

- Location in the Czech Republic
- Coordinates: 50°6′11″N 14°2′44″E
- Country: Czech Republic
- Region: Central Bohemian
- District: Kladno
- First mentioned: 1320

Area
  - Total: 7.12 km^{2} (2.75 sq mi)
- Elevation: 375 m (1,230 ft)

Population (2026-01-01)
  - Total: 1,057
  - Density: 148/km^{2} (384/sq mi)
- Time zone: UTC+1 (CET)
  - Summer (DST): UTC+2 (CEST)
- Postal code: 273 62
- Website: www.obecdruzec.cz

Družec is a municipality and village in Kladno District in the Central Bohemian Region of the Czech Republic. It has about 1,100 inhabitants.

== Etymology ==
The name was originally written as Družeč and was derived from the personal name Družec, meaning "Družec's (court)".

== Geography ==
Družec is located about 6 kilometres (4 mi) southwest of Kladno and 20 km (12 mi) west of Prague. It lies in the Křivoklát Highlands. The highest point is the Dojka hill at 445 m (1,460 ft) above sea level. The Loděnice River flows through the municipality.

== History ==
The first written mention of Družec is from 1320.

== Demographics ==
Historical population

Year	Pop.	±%
1869	655	—
1880	734	+12.1%
1890	762	+3.8%
1900	855	+12.2%
1910	967	+13.1%

Year	Pop.	±%
1921	865	−10.5%
1930	904	+4.5%
1950	919	+1.7%
1961	900	−2.1%
1970	835	−7.2%

Year	Pop.	±%
1980	832	−0.4%
1991	806	−3.1%
2001	821	+1.9%
2011	1,009	+22.9%
2021	1,044	+3.5%

Source: Censuses

== Transport ==
The D6 motorway from Prague to Karlovy Vary runs through the northern part of the municipality.

== Sights ==
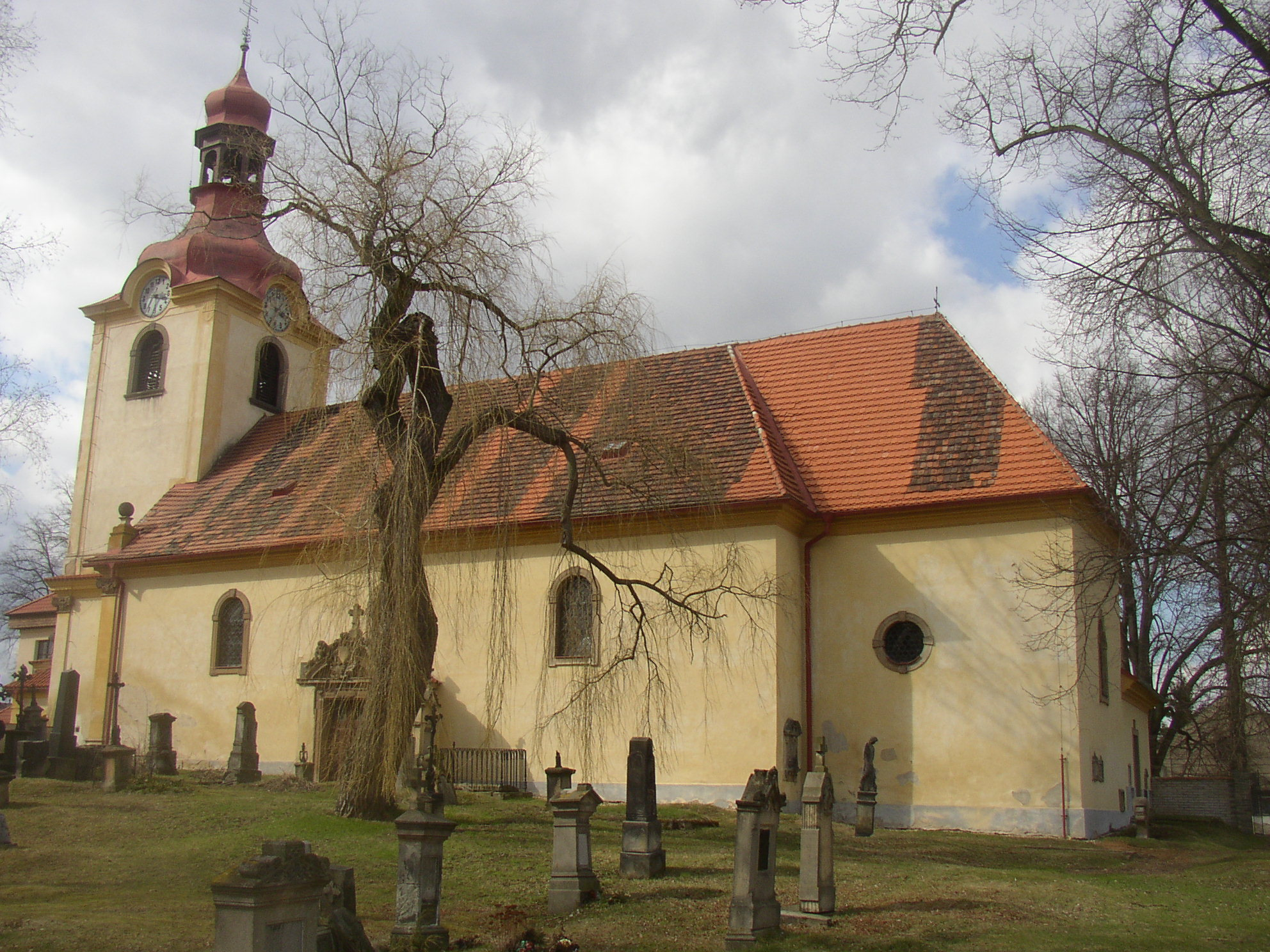
Church of the Assumption of the Virgin Mary

The main landmark of Družec is the Church of the Assumption of the Virgin Mary. It is a pilgrimage church, first mentioned in 1352. The originally Gothic church was rebuilt in the Baroque style in 1688–1689.

Next to the church there is a sandstone Marian column from 1674 and a man-sized menhir called Zkamenělec ('man-turned-into-stone'), surrounded with legends of a punished perjurer.
