= Nenačovice =

- Municipality
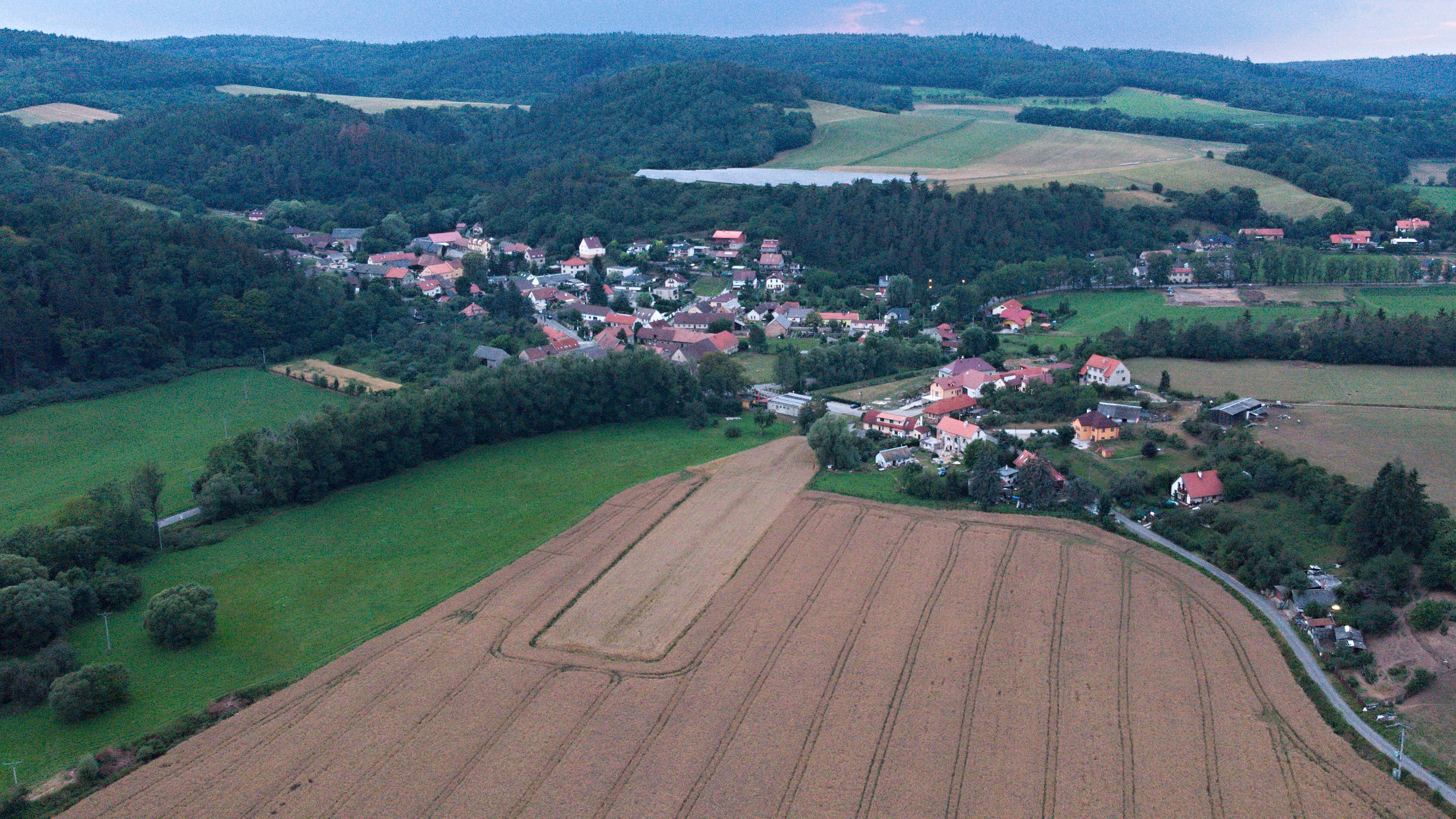
- Aerial view from the south

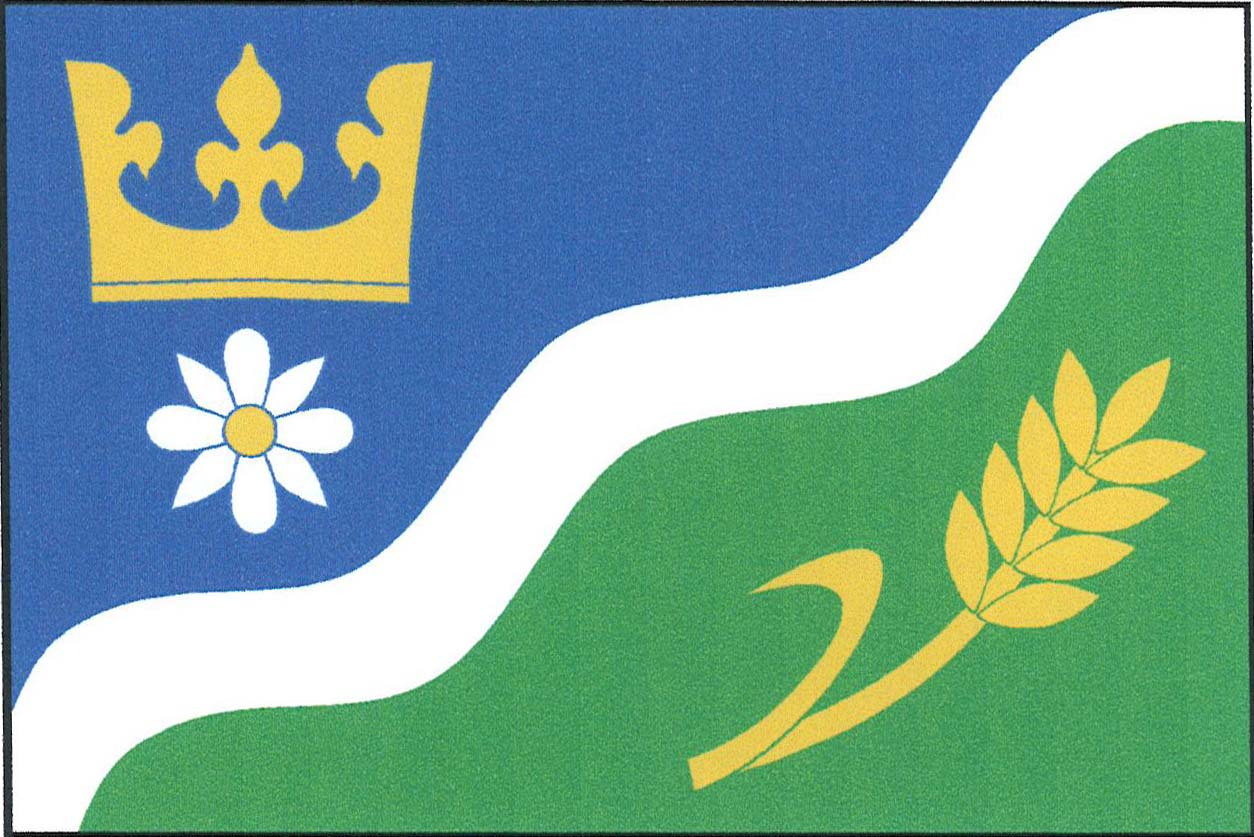
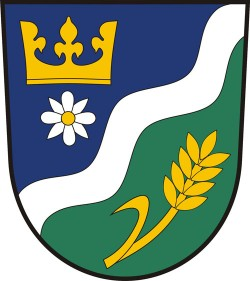
- Flag Coat of arms

- Location in the Czech Republic
- Coordinates: 50°1′9″N 14°8′21″E
- Country: Czech Republic
- Region: Central Bohemian
- District: Beroun
- First mentioned: 1357

Area
  - Total: 3.98 km^{2} (1.54 sq mi)
- Elevation: 275 m (902 ft)

Population (2026-01-01)
  - Total: 317
  - Density: 79.6/km^{2} (206/sq mi)
- Time zone: UTC+1 (CET)
  - Summer (DST): UTC+2 (CEST)
- Postal code: 266 01
- Website: www.nenacovice.cz

Nenačovice is a municipality and village in Beroun District in the Central Bohemian Region of the Czech Republic. It has about 300 inhabitants.

== Demographics ==
Historical population
Year	Pop.	±%
1869	295	—
1880	303	+2.7%
1890	304	+0.3%
1900	328	+7.9%
1910	327	−0.3%
1921	294	−10.1%
1930	292	−0.7%
1950	231	−20.9%
1961	234	+1.3%
1970	211	−9.8%
1980	196	−7.1%
1991	167	−14.8%
2001	167	+0.0%
2011	248	+48.5%
2021	292	+17.7%
Source: Censuses
