= Chyňava =

- Municipality
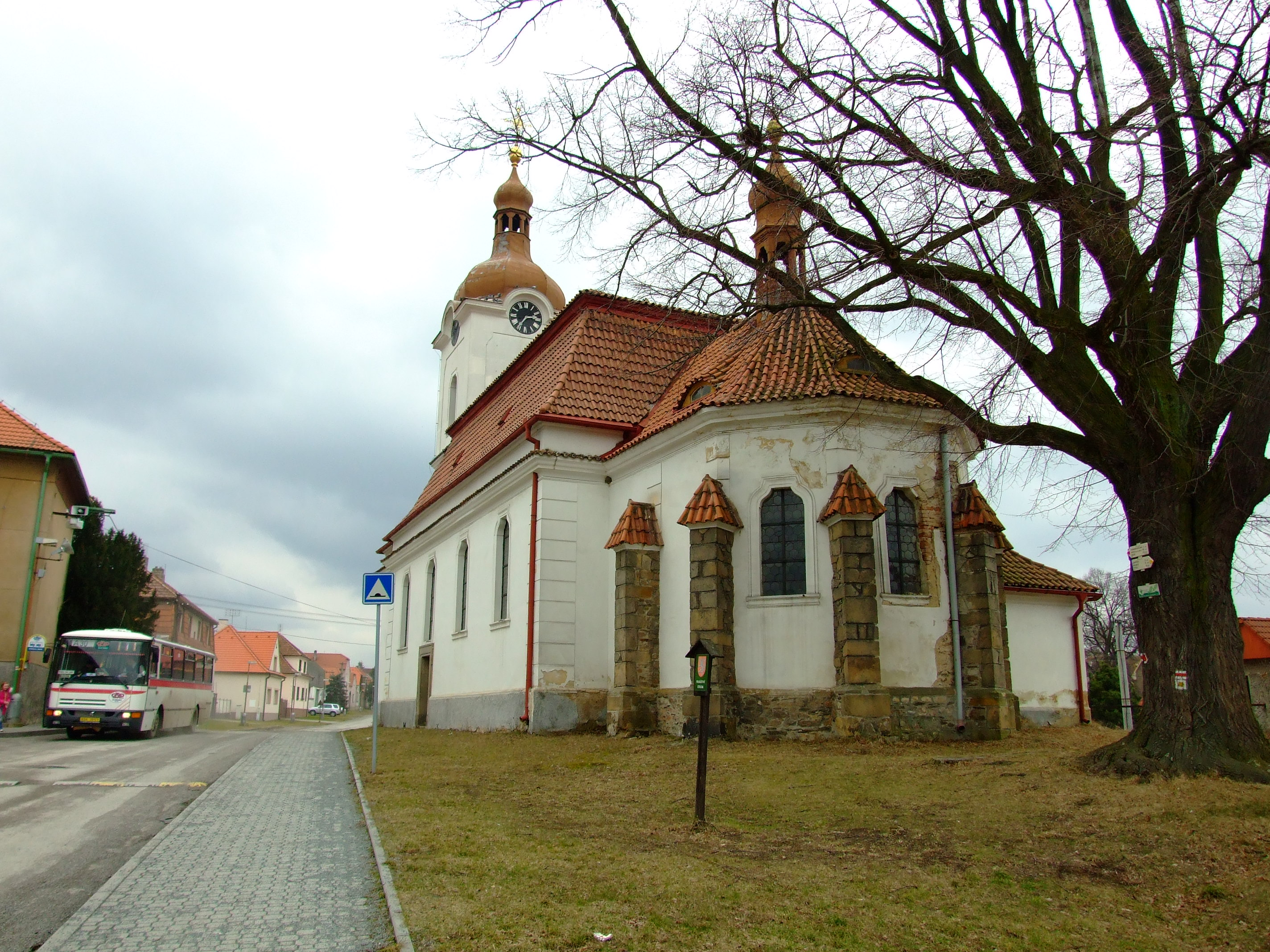
- Church of Saint Procopius

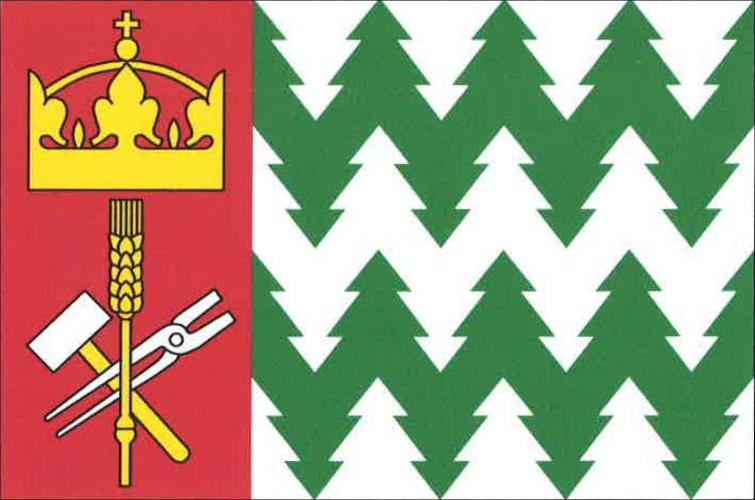
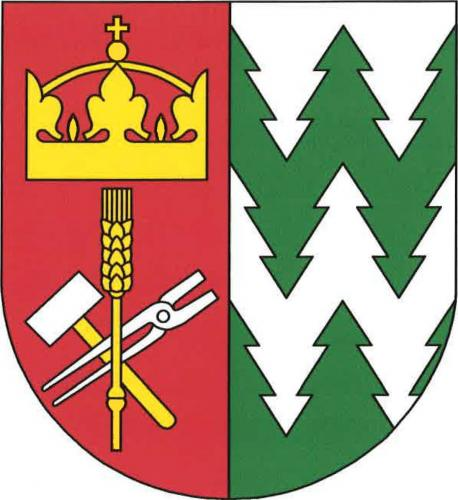
- Flag Coat of arms

- Location in the Czech Republic
- Coordinates: 50°1′39″N 14°4′27″E
- Country: Czech Republic
- Region: Central Bohemian
- District: Beroun
- First mentioned: 1341

Area
  - Total: 37.94 km^{2} (14.65 sq mi)
- Elevation: 397 m (1,302 ft)

Population (2026-01-01)
  - Total: 1,906
  - Density: 50.24/km^{2} (130.1/sq mi)
- Time zone: UTC+1 (CET)
  - Summer (DST): UTC+2 (CEST)
- Postal codes: 266 01, 267 07
- Website: www.chynava.cz

Chyňava is a municipality and village in Beroun District in the Central Bohemian Region of the Czech Republic. It has about 1,900 inhabitants.

== Administrative division ==
Chyňava consists of five municipal parts (in brackets population according to the 2021 census):

- Chyňava (1,300)
- Lhotka u Berouna (75)
- Libečov (130)
- Malé Přílepy (344)
- Podkozí (73)

== Etymology ==
The origin of the name Chyňava is uncertain. It could be derived from the Slavic verb chyniti ('to deceive', 'to pretend'). Chyňava could have been the surname of the first settler.

== Geography ==
Chyňava is located about 7 kilometres (4 mi) north of Beroun and 17 km (11 mi) west of Prague. It lies in the Křivoklát Highlands. The highest point is the hill Pelechovka at 471 m (1,545 ft) above sea level. The Loděnice River flows along the northern municipal border.

== History ==
The first written mention of Chyňava is from 1341. From 1357 to 1585, the village was part of the Karlštejn estate and shared its owners and destiny. During the Hussite Wars, Chyňava suffered and the population decreased. From 1585, Chyňava belonged to the Křivoklát estate. During the Thirty Years' War, Chyňava was heavily damaged and the population decreased significantly again, but the village slowly recovered.

== Demographics ==
Historical population

Year	Pop.	±%
1869	2,277	—
1880	2,278	+0.0%
1890	2,355	+3.4%
1900	2,432	+3.3%
1910	2,402	−1.2%

Year	Pop.	±%
1921	2,230	−7.2%
1930	2,168	−2.8%
1950	1,696	−21.8%
1961	1,699	+0.2%
1970	1,632	−3.9%

Year	Pop.	±%
1980	1,566	−4.0%
1991	1,442	−7.9%
2001	1,481	+2.7%
2011	1,762	+19.0%
2021	1,922	+9.1%

Source: Censuses

== Transport ==
There are no railways or major roads passing through the municipality.

== Sights ==
The main landmark of Chyňava is the Church of Saint Procopius. It was originally a medieval church, which was rebuilt in the Baroque style in 1779–1782 and then in the neo-Baroque style in 1914.

== Twin towns – sister cities ==
Chyňava is twinned with:

- Ledro, Italy
