= Doksy (Kladno District) =

- Municipality
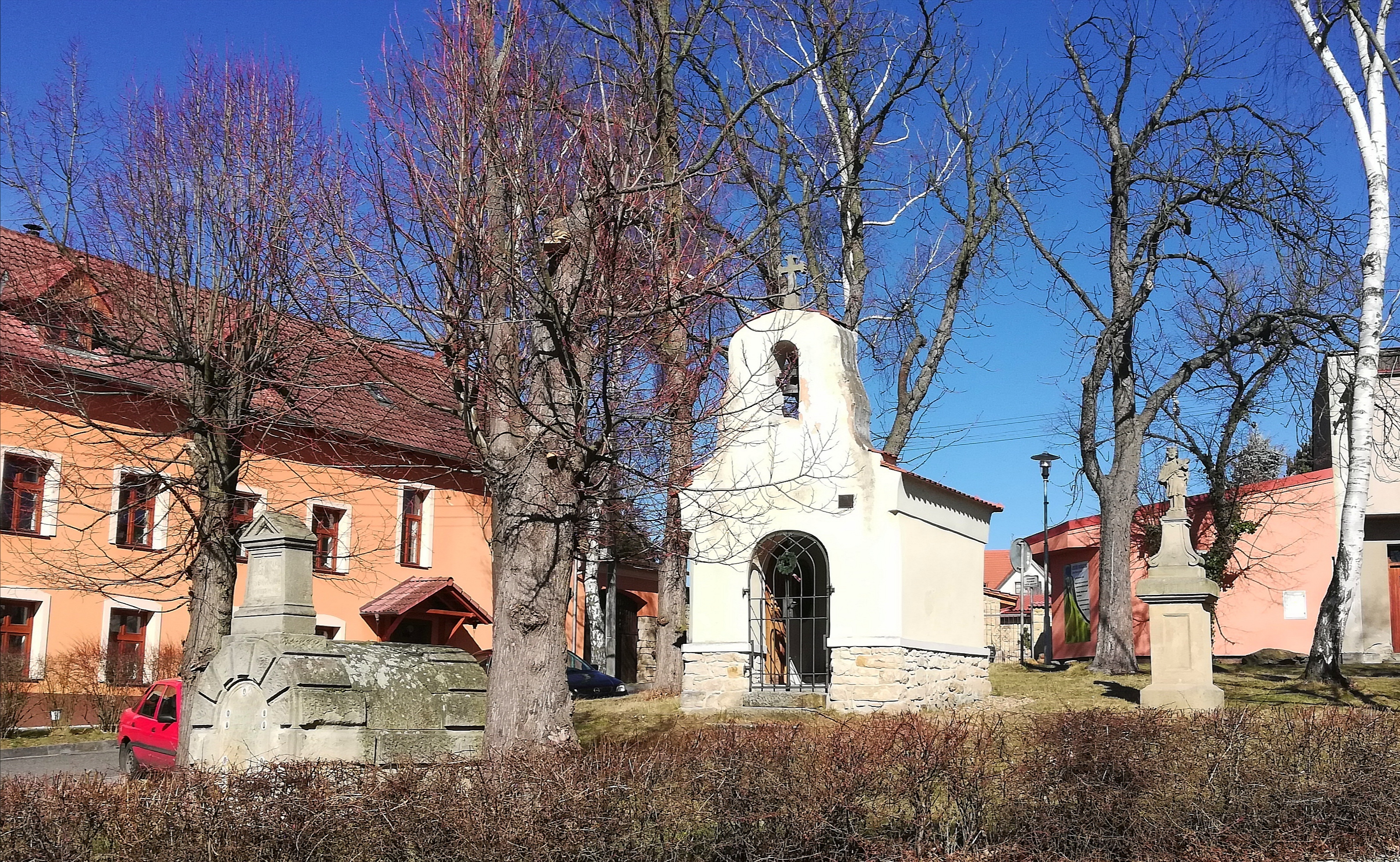
- Common with the Chapel of Saint John of Nepomuk

- Coat of arms

- Location in the Czech Republic
- Coordinates: 50°7′7″N 14°2′46″E
- Country: Czech Republic
- Region: Central Bohemian
- District: Kladno
- First mentioned: 1385

Area
  - Total: 2.92 km^{2} (1.13 sq mi)
- Elevation: 396 m (1,299 ft)

Population (2026-01-01)
  - Total: 1,734
  - Density: 594/km^{2} (1,540/sq mi)
- Time zone: UTC+1 (CET)
  - Summer (DST): UTC+2 (CEST)
- Postal code: 273 64
- Website: www.obecdoksy.cz

Doksy is a municipality and village in Kladno District in the Central Bohemian Region of the Czech Republic. It has about 1,700 inhabitants.

== Etymology ==
The village was formerly known as Dogz or Dogza, in German Doges. It is derived from an Old English word dox, i.e. 'dark'.

== Geography ==
Doksy lies about 3 kilometres (2 mi) southwest of Kladno and 20 km (12 mi) northwest of Prague. It is located in the Křivoklát Highlands. The Loděnice River flows through the southern part of the municipality and supplies the fishponds Hrázský rybník and Nohavice.

== History ==
The first written mention of Doksy is from 1385. Sandstone was quarried there at least since the 14th century. The sandstone was used for construction in nearby Prague during the reign of King Charles IV. The quarries ended activity in 1924.

== Demographics ==
Historical population

Year	Pop.	±%
1869	521	—
1880	595	+14.2%
1890	749	+25.9%
1900	1,072	+43.1%
1910	1,178	+9.9%

Year	Pop.	±%
1921	1,241	+5.3%
1930	1,373	+10.6%
1950	1,137	−17.2%
1961	1,241	+9.1%
1970	1,116	−10.1%

Year	Pop.	±%
1980	1,086	−2.7%
1991	1,099	+1.2%
2001	1,075	−2.2%
2011	1,358	+26.3%
2021	1,712	+26.1%

Source: Censuses

== Transport ==
The D6 motorway from Prague to Karlovy Vary runs through the southern part of the municipality.

== Sights ==
The only protected cultural monuments of Doksy are the Chapel of Saint John of Nepomuk from the second half of the 18th century with a statue of St. John of Nepomuk from the end of the 18th century, and a sandstone tombstone of a maid dating from 1675.

== Twin towns – sister cities ==
Doksy is twinned with:

- Ledro, Italy
