= Srbsko =

- Municipality
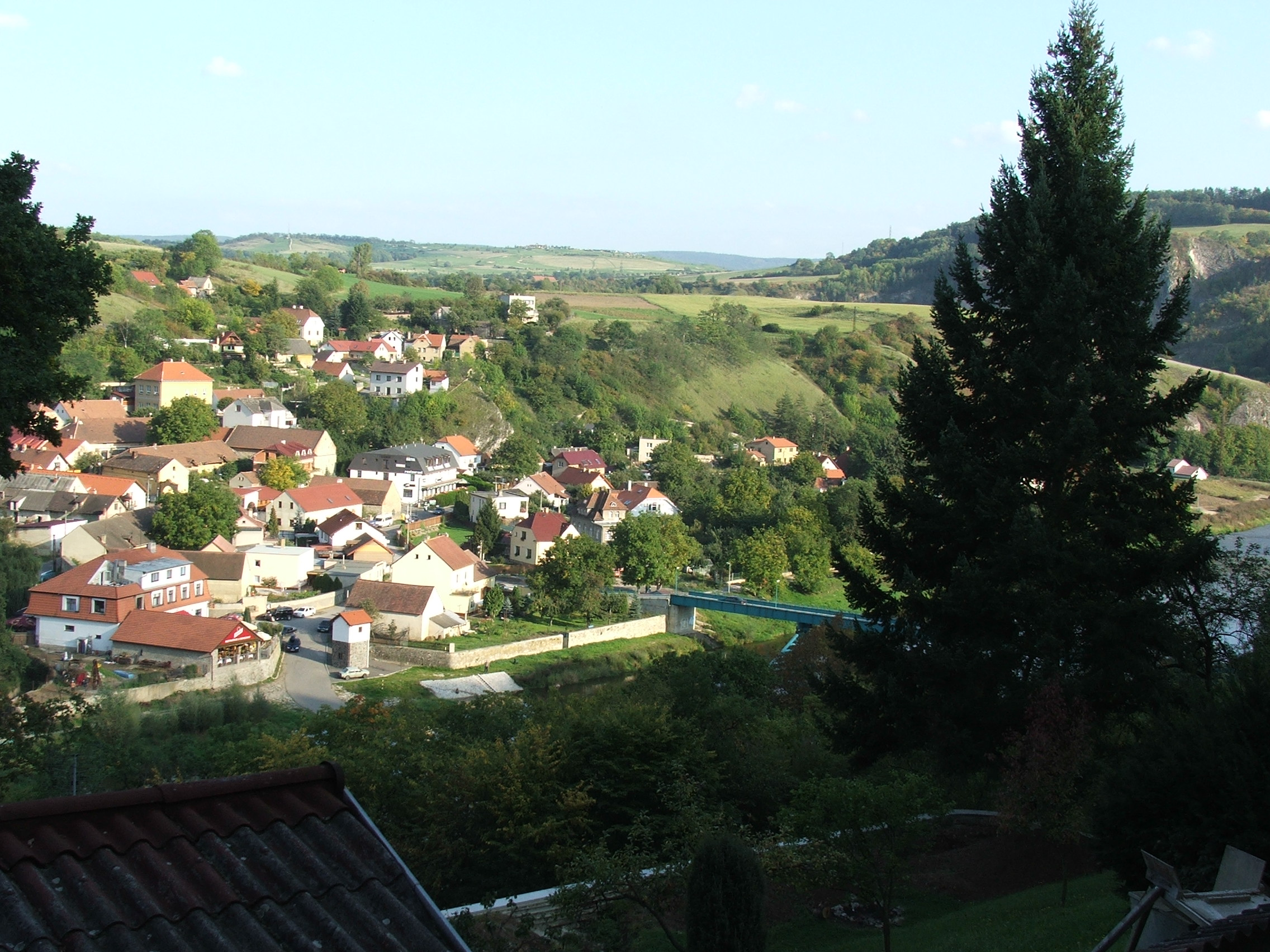
- General view

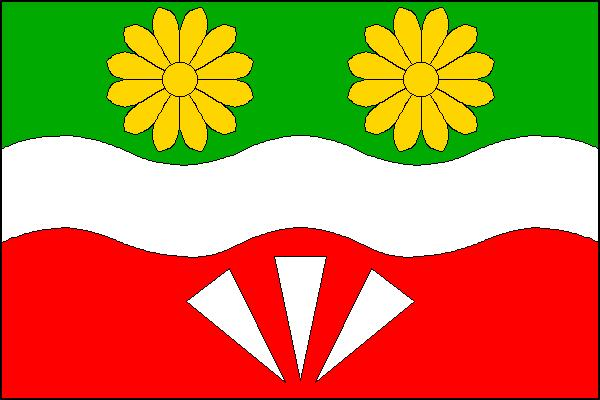
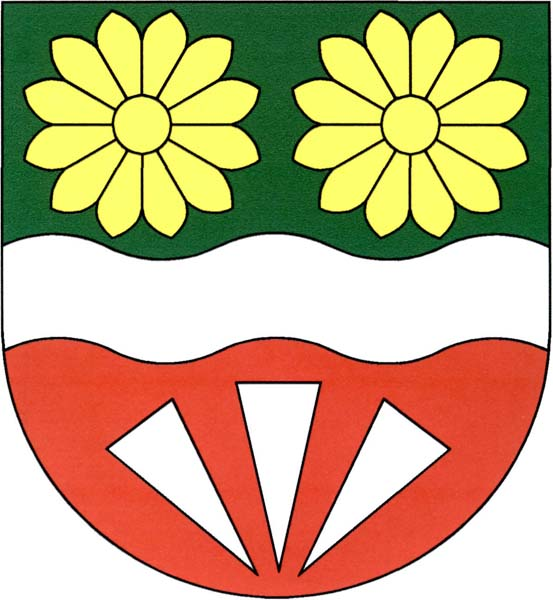
- Flag Coat of arms

- Location in the Czech Republic
- Coordinates: 49°56′14″N 14°8′10″E
- Country: Czech Republic
- Region: Central Bohemian
- District: Beroun
- First mentioned: 1428

Area
  - Total: 6.56 km^{2} (2.53 sq mi)
- Elevation: 225 m (738 ft)

Population (2026-01-01)
  - Total: 557
  - Density: 84.9/km^{2} (220/sq mi)
- Time zone: UTC+1 (CET)
  - Summer (DST): UTC+2 (CEST)
- Postal code: 267 18
- Website: www.obecsrbsko.cz

Srbsko is a municipality and village in Beroun District in the Central Bohemian Region of the Czech Republic. It has about 600 inhabitants.

== Demographics ==
Historical population
Year	Pop.	±%
1869	302	—
1880	314	+4.0%
1890	343	+9.2%
1900	380	+10.8%
1910	452	+18.9%
1921	535	+18.4%
1930	595	+11.2%
1950	578	−2.9%
1961	604	+4.5%
1970	535	−11.4%
1980	490	−8.4%
1991	441	−10.0%
2001	460	+4.3%
2011	479	+4.1%
2021	551	+15.0%
Source: Censuses
