= Třtice =

- Municipality
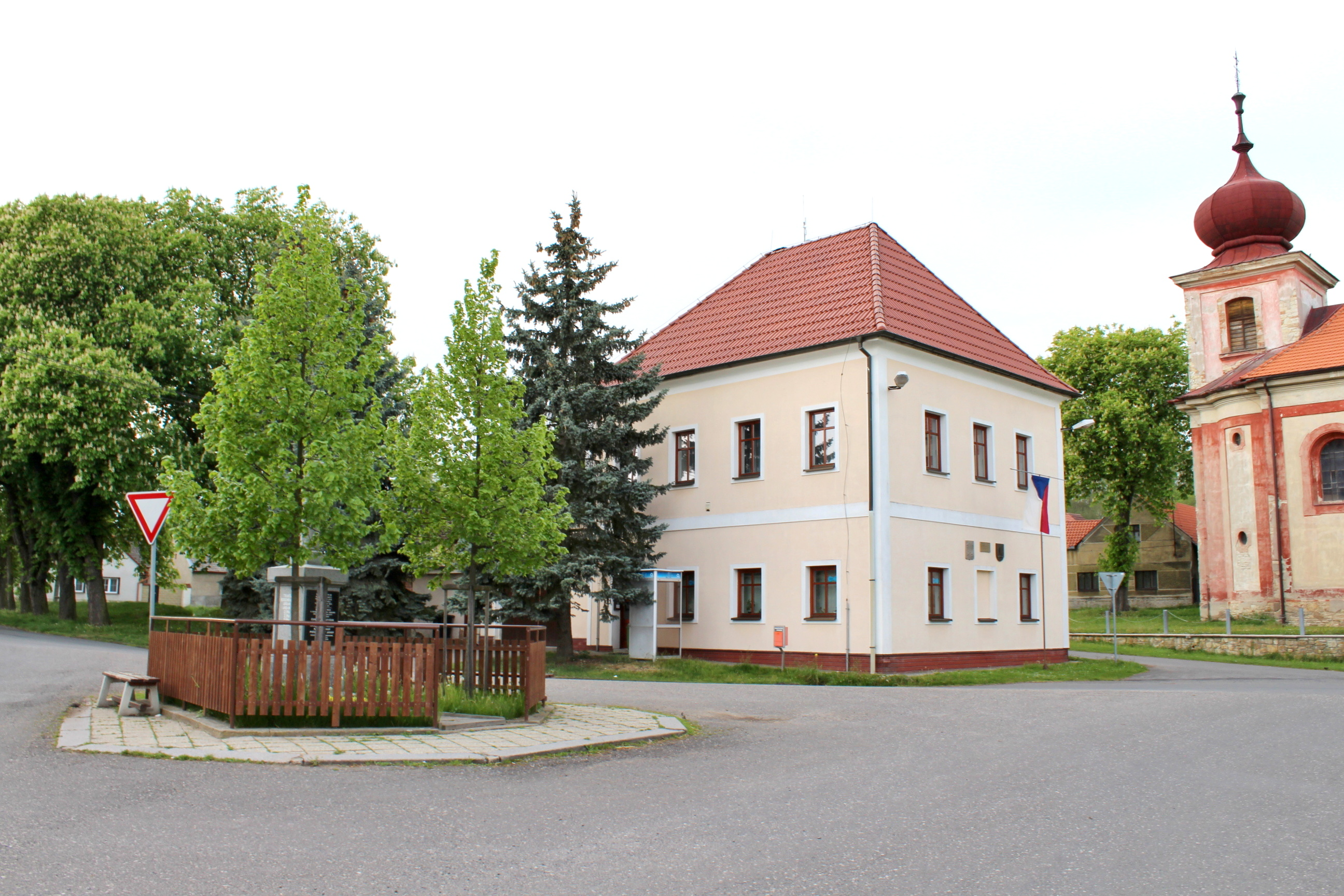
- Centre of Třtice with municipal office and Church of Saint Nicholas

- Flag Coat of arms

- Location in the Czech Republic
- Coordinates: 50°11′6″N 13°51′49″E
- Country: Czech Republic
- Region: Central Bohemian
- District: Rakovník
- First mentioned: 1352

Area
  - Total: 8.90 km^{2} (3.44 sq mi)
- Elevation: 444 m (1,457 ft)

Population (2026-01-01)
  - Total: 525
  - Density: 59.0/km^{2} (153/sq mi)
- Time zone: UTC+1 (CET)
  - Summer (DST): UTC+2 (CEST)
- Postal code: 271 01
- Website: www.trtice.cz

Třtice is a municipality and village in Rakovník District in the Central Bohemian Region of the Czech Republic. It has about 500 inhabitants.

== History ==
The first written mention of Třtice is from 1352. It belonged to the Křivoklát estate.

== Demographics ==
Historical population
Year	Pop.	±%
1869	943	—
1880	911	−3.4%
1890	805	−11.6%
1900	739	−8.2%
1910	705	−4.6%
1921	715	+1.4%
1930	759	+6.2%
1950	573	−24.5%
1961	527	−8.0%
1970	523	−0.8%
1980	490	−6.3%
1991	417	−14.9%
2001	399	−4.3%
2011	452	+13.3%
2021	499	+10.4%
Source: Censuses
