= Ptice =

- Municipality
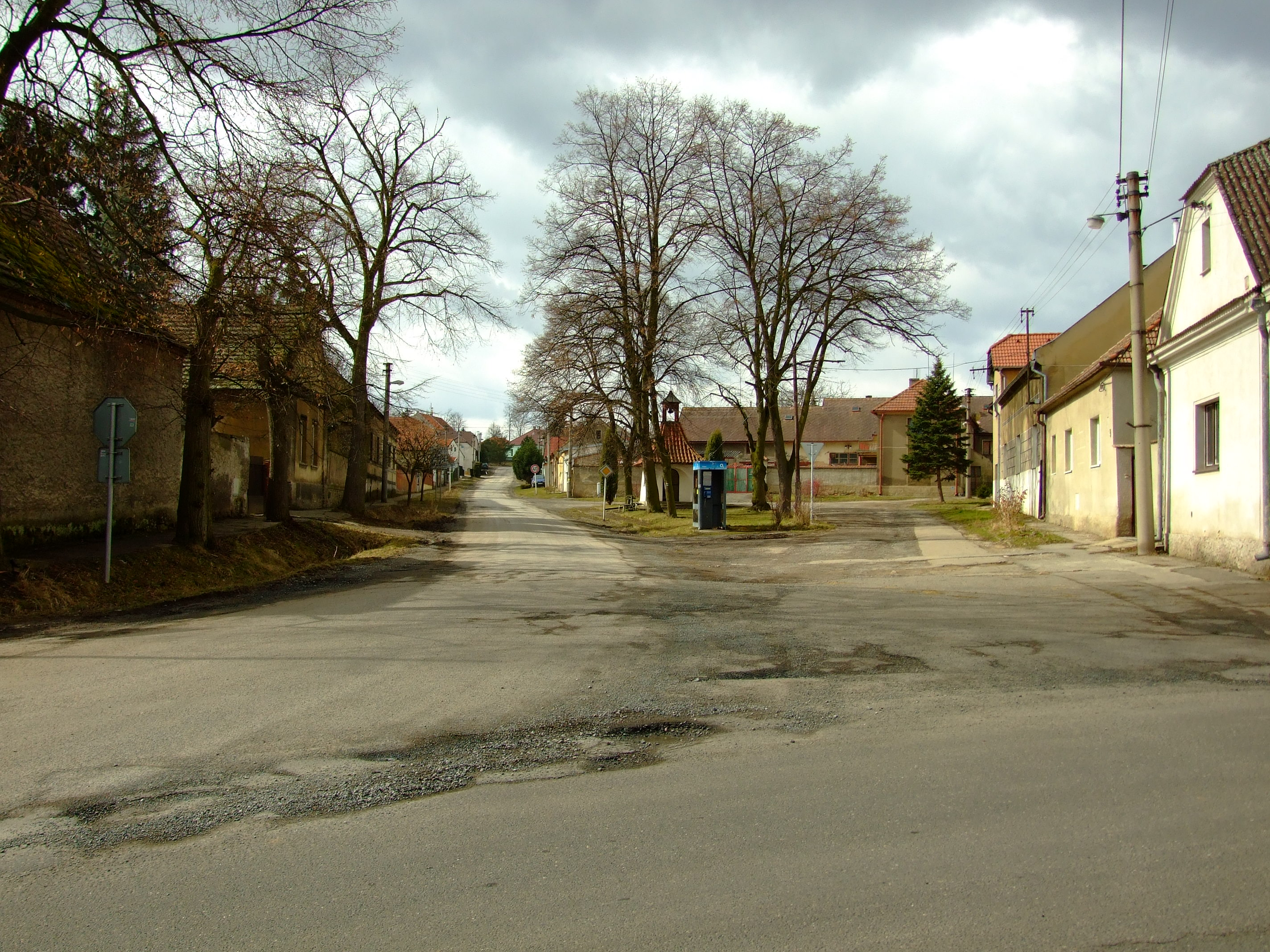
- Common in Ptice

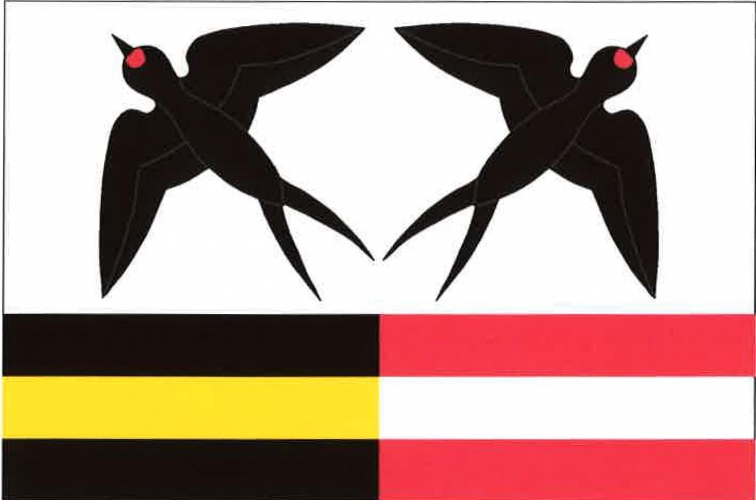
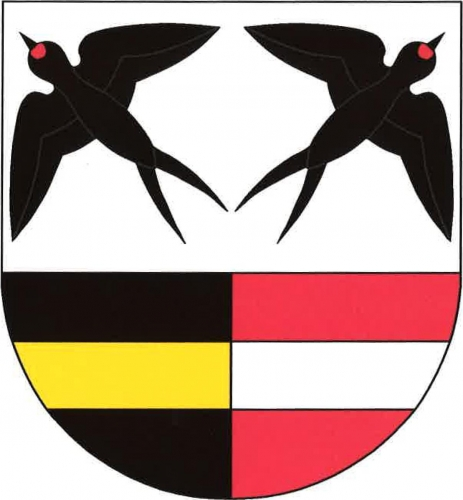
- Flag Coat of arms

- Location in the Czech Republic
- Coordinates: 50°1′39″N 14°4′27″E
- Country: Czech Republic
- Region: Central Bohemian
- District: Prague-West
- Founded: 1328

Area
  - Total: 7.82 km^{2} (3.02 sq mi)
- Elevation: 408 m (1,339 ft)

Population (2026-01-01)
  - Total: 1,015
  - Density: 130/km^{2} (336/sq mi)
- Time zone: UTC+1 (CET)
  - Summer (DST): UTC+2 (CEST)
- Postal code: 252 18
- Website: www.obecptice.cz

Ptice is a municipality and village in Prague-West District in the Central Bohemian Region of the Czech Republic. It has about 1,000 inhabitants.

== Demographics ==
Historical population
Year	Pop.	±%
1869	460	—
1880	502	+9.1%
1890	538	+7.2%
1900	544	+1.1%
1910	592	+8.8%
1921	568	−4.1%
1930	494	−13.0%
1950	438	−11.3%
1961	446	+1.8%
1970	424	−4.9%
1980	379	−10.6%
1991	346	−8.7%
2001	397	+14.7%
2011	722	+81.9%
2021	1,011	+40.0%
Source: Censuses

== Twin towns – sister cities ==
Ptice is twinned with:

- Ledro, Italy
