= 7th Bersaglieri Regiment =

Active Italian Army infantry unit

- 7° Reggimento bersaglieri
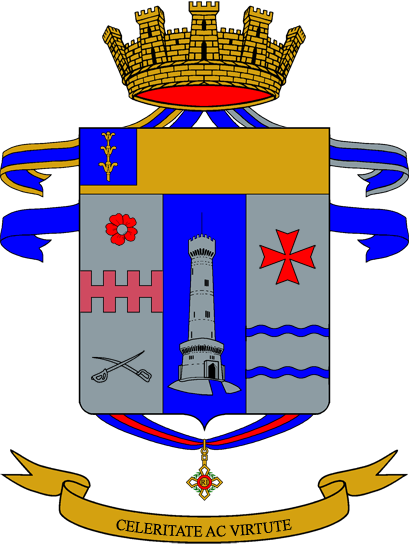
- Regimental coat of arms
- Active: 1 Jan. 1871 — 13 May 1943; 1 Aug. 1943 — 8 Sept. 1943; 21 Oct. 1975 — 15 Sept. 1992; 20 Oct. 1992 — today
- Country: Italy
- Branch: Italian Army
- Part of: Mechanized Brigade "Pinerolo"
- Garrison/HQ: Altamura
- Motto: "Celeritate ac virtute"
- Anniversaries: 18 June 1836
- Decorations: 1x Military Order of Italy; 1x Gold Medal of Military Valor; 1x Silver Medal of Military Valor; 2x Bronze Medals of Military Valor

Insignia
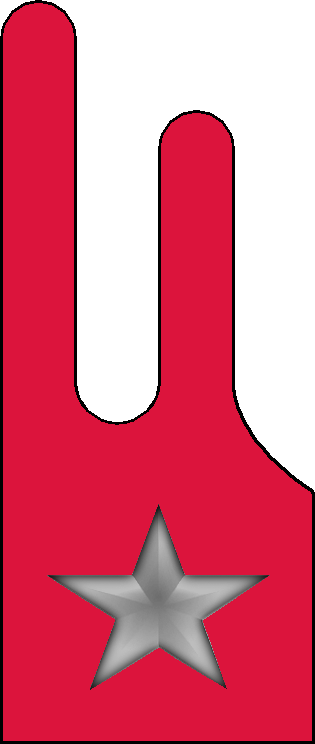
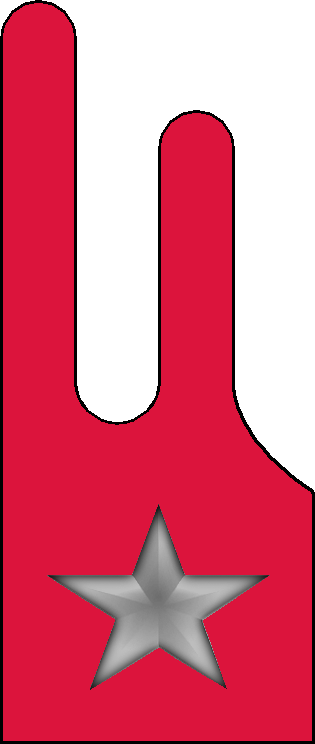
- Bersaglieri gorget patches

The 7th Bersaglieri Regiment (Italian: 7° Reggimento Bersaglieri) is an active unit of the Italian Army based in Altamura in Apulia. The regiment is part of the army's infantry corps' Bersaglieri speciality and operationally assigned to the Mechanized Brigade "Pinerolo". The regiment was formed in 1871 by the Royal Italian Army with preexisting battalions. During World War I the regiment served on the Italian front. In World War II the regiment was assigned to the 102nd Motorized Division "Trento", with which it fought in the Western Desert Campaign in North Africa. In November 1942 the regiment was destroyed during the Second Battle of El Alamein. After being reformed in Tripoli in Libya the regiment fought in the Tunisian Campaign, where it was destroyed for a second time.

In 1976 the regiment's flag and traditions were assigned to the 10th Bersaglieri Battalion "Bezzecca", which had become an autonomous unit on 21 October 1975. In 1992 the 7th Bersaglieri Regiment was reformed in Bari and assigned to the Mechanized Brigade "Pinerolo". The regiment's anniversary falls, as for all Bersaglieri units, on 18 June 1836, the day the Bersaglieri speciality was founded.

== History ==
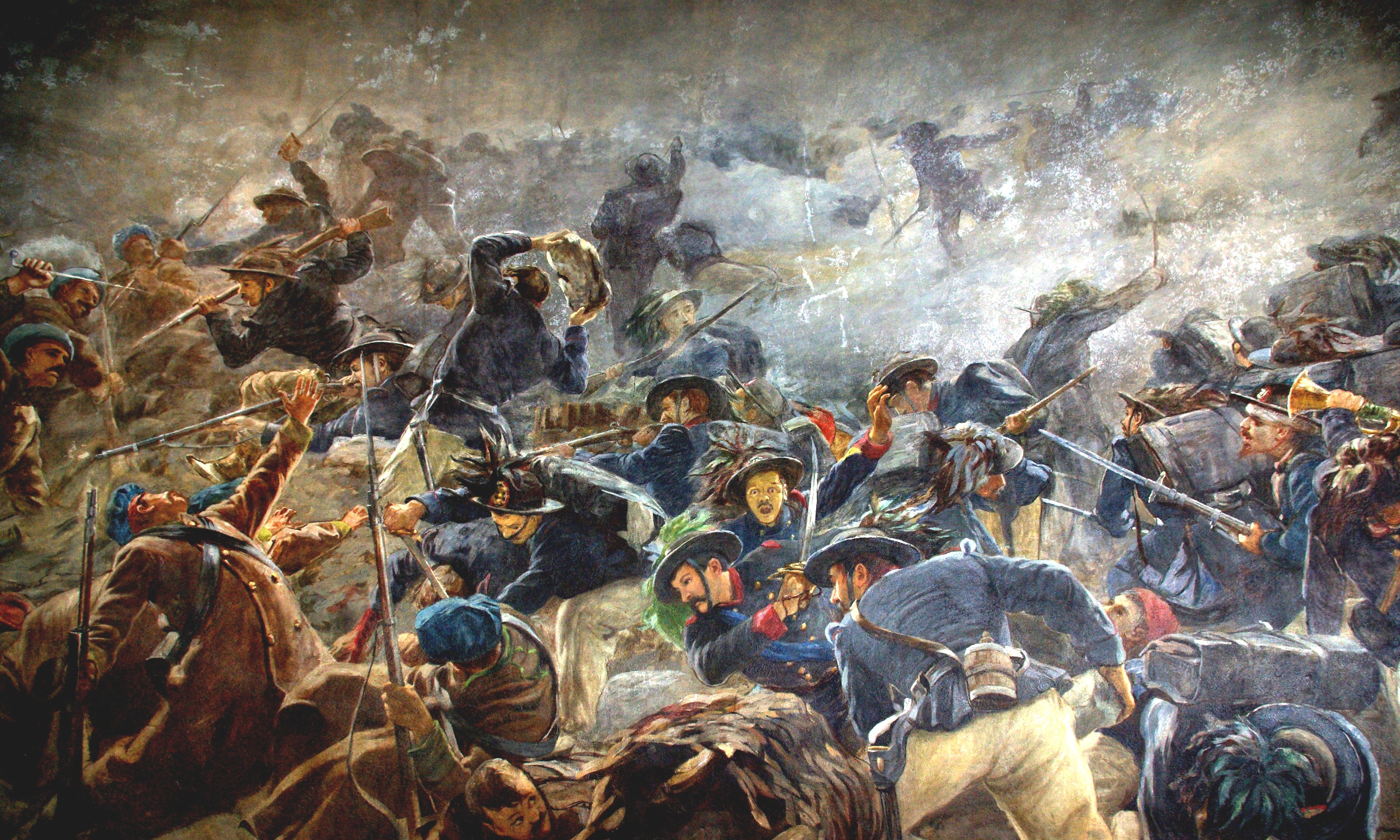
Bersaglieri halt the Russian advance during the Battle of the Chernaya in Crimea in 1855

On 1 January 1871 the 7th Bersaglieri Regiment was formed in Verona with the VIII Battalion, X Battalion, XI Battalion, and XV Battalion, which were transferred from the 2nd Bersaglieri Regiment. The four battalions were renumbered as I, II, III, and IV battalion upon entering the new regiment. On 16 September 1883 the IV Battalion was transferred to the newly formed 11th Bersaglieri Regiment. On 18 June 1886, all Bersaglieri battalions resumed their original numbering and afterwards the 7th Bersaglieri Regiment consisted of the VIII Battalion, X Battalion, and XI Battalion.

The VIII Battalion had been formed by the Royal Sardinian Army in 1850 and the X Battalion in 1852. In 1855 the VIII Battalion's 29th and 30th companies were assigned to the IV Provisional Bersaglieri Battalion, while the X Battalion's 37th and 38th companies were assigned to the V Provisional Bersaglieri Battalion. The two provisional battalions were part of the Sardinian Expeditionary Corps, which fought in the Crimean War. The two battalions fought in the Battle of the Chernaya and the Siege of Sevastopol.

In 1859 the VIII and X battalions fought in the Second Italian War of Independence. During the war the X Battalion distinguished itself in the Battle of Solferino and was awarded a Bronze Medal of Military Valor, which was affixed to the flag of the 7th Bersaglieri Regiment and added to the regiment's coat of arms, when the battalion joined the regiment. The same year the XI Battalion was formed. In 1860-61 the three battalions participated in the Sardinian campaign in central and southern Italy. In 1866 the battalions participated in the Third Italian War of Independence and fought in the Battle of Custoza, during which the VIII Battalion distinguished itself and was awarded a Bronze Medal of Military Valor. In September 1870 the X Battalion participated in the capture of Rome.

In 1887-88 the regiment's 12th Company was deployed to Eritrea for the Italo-Ethiopian War of 1887–1889. In 1895-96 the regiment provided 23 officers and 267 troops to help form the I, II, IV, and V provisional battalions, which were deployed to Eritrea for the First Italo-Ethiopian War. On 1 October 1910 the regiment's depot in Brescia formed the VII Cyclists Battalion. In 1911, the regiment's 12th Cyclists Company was deployed to Libya for the Italo-Turkish War. Furthermore the regiment provided 15 officers and 744 troops to augment units fighting in the war.

=== World War I ===
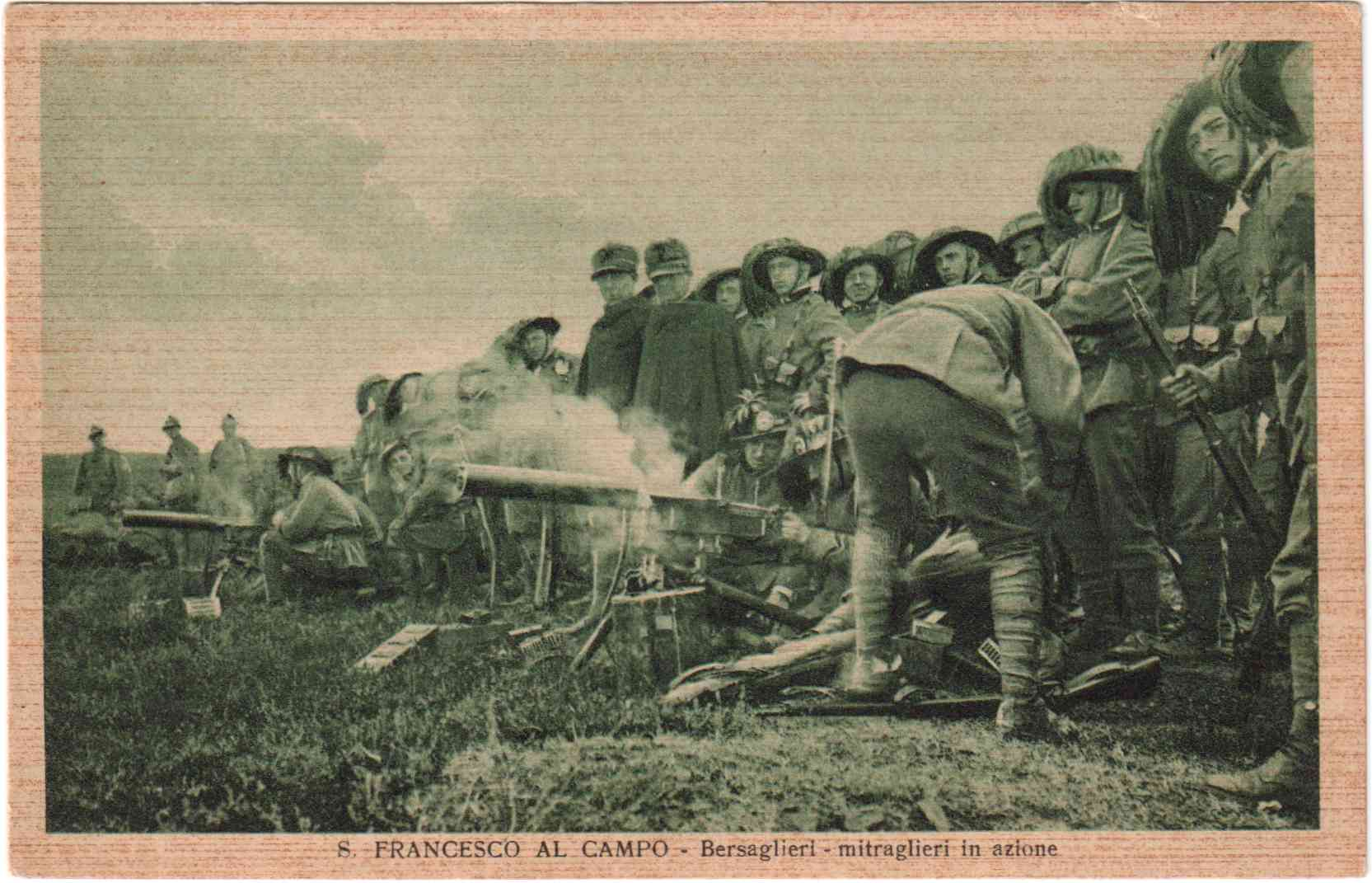
Bersaglieri train to use Fiat–Revelli Modello 1914 machine guns during World War I

At the outbreak of World War I the regiment consisted of the VIII, X, and XI battalions and the VII Cyclists Battalion, which operated as an autonomous unit throughout the war. On 11 February 1915 the regiment's XI Battalion left Italy for Italian Libya. The same month the regimental depot in Brescia formed the XI bis Battalion as replacement and the XLV Battalion, which initially operated as an autonomous unit. On 23 May 1915, the day Italy entered the war, the 7th Bersaglieri Regiment was deployed in the Ledro valley, where over the course of the summer it clashed with Austro-Hungarian forces. On 22 October 1915 the X Battalion pushed Austrian forces out of the villages of Pieve di Ledro, Locca, and Bezzecca.

On 5 January 1916 the XI bis Battalion was renumbered as XLIV Battalion. On 12 March 1916 the regiment was reinforced with the XLV Battalion. Over summer 1916 the regiment remained in the Ledro Valley. On 6 November 1916 the 7th Bersaglieri Regiment replaced the 9th Bersaglieri Regiment in the II Bersaglieri Brigade, which also included the 11th Bersaglieri Regiment. On the same date the XLV Battalion left the regiment and became an autonomous unit again. The II Bersaglieri Brigade entered the front on the Karst plateau. In May 1917 the II Bersaglieri Brigade fought at Jamiano. On 2 June 1917, the brigade was taken out of the front to rest, but only two days later it returned to the first line as on 3 June 1917 the Royal Italian Army began the Battle of Flondar, which was part of the larger Tenth Battle of the Isonzo. For its conduct at Jamiano and Flondar the 7th Bersaglieri Regiment was awarded a Silver Medal of Military Valor, which was affixed to the regiment's flag and added to the regiment's coat of arms.

In October 1917 the brigade fought in the Battle of Caporetto on Monte Piana and on Mauria Pass. In October 1918 the brigade participated in the Battle of Vittorio Veneto, initially at Serravalle and then at Revine Lago. On 1 November the brigade was taken out of the front and sent to Venice, where it boarded ships and sailed for Trieste. On 3 November the 7th Bersaglieri Regiment's X Battalion and the 11th Bersaglieri Regiment's XXXIX Battalion disembarked in Trieste and occupied the city. The rest of the brigade followed in the course of the day.

At the outbreak of the war each Royal Italian Army infantry and Bersaglieri battalion fielded one machine gun section with two Maxim 1911 machine guns, which were carried by horses. This proved quickly to be inadequate and in spring 1916 the army began to form dedicated machine gunners companies. The regimental depot of the 7th Bersaglieri Regiment in Brescia was chosen to form all Bersaglieri machine gunners Companies, which were each equipped with six Fiat–Revelli Modello 1914 machine guns. Until the end of the war the depot formed 84 Bersaglieri machine gunners Companies.

=== Interwar years ===
After World War I the Royal Italian Army reduced its forces and the VII Cyclists Battalion was disbanded in 1919. In 1920 the XLIV Battalion became a reserve unit. On 10 August 1921 the XLIV Battalion was disbanded and the X Battalion became a reserve unit. On 1 January 1923 the XI Battalion, which had just returned from Libya, was reduced to a reserve unit too. Afterwards the regiment consisted of only the VIII Battalion, and the X and XI reserve battalions. On 1 June 1923 the X Battalion was reformed as an active unit. In July 1924 the regiment became a cyclists unit.

In 1935 the regiment moved from Brescia to Bolzano. In 1936 the regiment lost its role as cyclists unit. On 22 January 1939 the regiment was assigned to the 102nd Motorized Division "Trento", which also included the 61st Infantry Regiment "Trento", 62nd Infantry Regiment "Trento", and 46th Artillery Regiment "Trento". On 1 April 1939 the XI Battalion was reformed as an active unit. On 7 April 1939 the X Battalion participated in the Invasion of Albania. On 15 July 1939 the XI Battalion was again disbanded. On 29 August 1939 the VIII and X battalions were reorganized as motorcyclists battalions.

=== World War II ===
On 4 April 1940 the regiment reformed the XI Battalion, and received the 106th Cannons Company, which was equipped with 47/32 mod. 35 anti-tank guns, and an Auto Unit. In June 1940 the regiment participated in the Invasion of France. At the time the regiment consisted of the following units:

- 7th Bersaglieri Regiment
  - Command Company
  - VIII Motorcyclists Battalion
  - X Auto-transported Battalion
  - XI Auto-transported Battalion
  - 106th Cannons Company, with 47/32 mod. 35 anti-tank guns
  - Transport Unit

In December 1940 the British Western Desert Force commenced the Operation Compass to expel the Italian 10th Army from Egypt. The British offensive resulted in the destruction of the Italian 10th Army and the conquest of Cyrenaica. In March 1941 the Trento was ordered to North Africa, where it participated in the Western Desert campaign. The division fought in Operation Sonnenblume and then participated in the Siege of Tobruk. On 18 November 1941 the British Eighth Army launched Operation Crusader to relieve the siege of Tobruk. On 6 December the Axis forces received the order to retreat westwards. On 29 December 1941 the 7th Bersaglieri Regiment, which had lost more than 50% of its men during the preceding month, left the Trento and became a corps asset of the Italian XXI Army Corps.

After reorganizing at El Agheila the German-Italian Panzer Group Africa counterattacked on 21 January 1942 and drove British forces back to Ain el Gazala. During the offensive the 7th Bersaglieri Regiment acted as the vanguard of the XXI Army Corps. In May and June 1942 the regiment fought in the Battle of Gazala, during which it participated in the Axis capture of Tobruk. On 24 June the regiment was the first Axis unit to reach Sallum in Egypt. From 26 to 29 June the regiment fought in the Battle of Mersa Matruh. On 29 June the regiment entered Mersa Matruh and accepted the surrender of 6,000 British troops and captured a great deal of supplies and equipment. In July 1942 the regiment fought in the First Battle of El Alamein during which it defeated an attack by the 9th Australian Division.

On 23 October 1942 the British Eighth Army commenced the Second Battle of El Alamein. On 28 October the regiment's XI Battalion was surrounded by British Forces and forced to surrender. On 2 November the remnants of the regiment were ordered to retreat and for the rest of the month the regiment formed the Axis' rearguard. On 25 November 1942 the 102nd Motorized Division "Trento" was declared lost due to wartime events and on 15 December the regiment arrived in Tripoli, where it was assigned to the Libya Training Center Command. The regiment's X Battalion was transferred to the 8th Bersaglieri Regiment, while the regiment's remaining troops were grouped into a single company. In Tripoli the XI Battalion was reformed with reinforcements sent from Italy, but once the battalion was combat ready it too was transferred to the 8th Bersaglieri Regiment.

In January 1943 the regiment was reformed with the V and XII battalions, which had arrived from Italy and were originally intended for the 8th Bersaglieri Regiment. The regiment then fought in the Tunisian Campaign: in March 1943 in the Battle of the Mareth Line and then in the Axis retreat towards Tunis. After having lost 60% of its personnel the regiment's remaining troops passed to the 8th Bersaglieri Regiment on 26 April. On 13 May 1943 Axis forces in Tunisia surrendered and the 7th Bersaglieri Regiment was declared lost due to wartime events.

For its service and sacrifice in North Africa the regiment was awarded a Gold Medal of Military Valor, which was affixed to the regiment's flag and added to the regiment's coat of arms. The regiment was reformed on 1 August 1943 in Bolzano with the X, XI and XLIV cyclists battalions and one motorcyclists company, but after the announcement of the Armistice of Cassibile on 8 September 1943 invading German forces disbanded the regiment.

=== Cold War ===
During the 1975 army reform the army disbanded the regimental level and newly independent battalions were granted for the first time their own flags. On 20 October 1975 the 3rd Bersaglieri Regiment was disbanded and the next day the regiment's XXV Bersaglieri Battalion in Solbiate Olona became an autonomous unit and was renamed 10th Bersaglieri Battalion "Bezzecca". The battalion was named for Bezzecca, where the 7th Bersaglieri Regiment had fought during World War I. The battalion was assigned to the 3rd Mechanized Brigade "Goito" and consisted of a command, a command and services company, three mechanized companies with M113 armored personnel carriers, and a heavy mortar company with M106 mortar carriers with 120mm Mod. 63 mortars. The battalion fielded now 896 men (45 officers, 100 non-commissioned officers, and 751 soldiers).

On 12 November 1976 the President of the Italian Republic Giovanni Leone assigned with decree 846 the flag and traditions of the 7th Bersaglieri Regiment to the battalion. Between 15 February and 13 July 1983 the battalion deployed to Lebanon as part of the Multinational Force in Lebanon.

=== Recent times ===
After the end of the Cold War Italian Army began a drawdown of its forces and the 3rd Mechanized Brigade "Goito" was scheduled to disband on 1 June 1991. On 28 February 1991 the 37th Mechanized Infantry Battalion "Ravenna" in Bologna transferred its flag to the Shrine of the Flags in the Vittoriano in Rome. The same day the companies of the 10th Bersaglieri Battalion "Bezzecca" in Solbiate Olona were disbanded and the next day, on 1 March 1991, the flag of the 10th Bersaglieri Battalion "Bezzecca" arrived in Bologna, where the battalion was reformed with the troops and equipment of the 37th Mechanized Infantry Battalion "Ravenna". The same day the battalion joined the Mechanized Brigade "Trieste".

On 31 May 1991 the Mechanized Brigade "Trieste" was disbanded and the next day the remaining units of the brigade joined the Mechanized Brigade "Friuli". On 15 September 1992 the 10th Bersaglieri Battalion "Bezzecca" transferred its flag to the Shrine of the Flags in the Vittoriano in Rome. The next day, on 16 September 1992, the troops and equipment of the 10th Bersaglieri Battalion "Bezzecca" were used to reform the 6th Bersaglieri Battalion "Palestro", which on the same day entered the reformed 6th Bersaglieri Regiment. On 19 October 1992 the flag of the 7th Bersaglieri Regiment left the Shrine of the Flags in the Vittoriano in Rome and was transferred to Bari, where the next day it replaced the flag of the 182nd Armored Infantry Regiment "Garibaldi", which had been the flag assigned to the 11th Bersaglieri Battalion "Caprera" since 1976. Subsequently the flag of the 182nd Armored Infantry Regiment "Garibaldi" was transferred to the Shrine of the Flags, and one the same day, 20 October 1992, the 7th Bersaglieri Regiment was reformed in Bari.

The reformed regiment consisted of the 11th Bersaglieri Battalion "Caprera" and was assigned to the Mechanized Brigade "Pinerolo". The three silver medals of military valor, which had been awarded to the XI Cyclists Battalion and been affixed to the flag of the 182nd Infantry Regiment "Garibaldi" since 1964, were transferred to the flag of the 7th Bersaglieri Regiment, while the Gold Medal of Military Valor, which had been awarded to the 182nd Infantry Regiment "Garibaldi", remained affixed to the flag, which was deposited in the Shrine of the Flags. The Bronze Medal of Army Valor, which had been awarded to the 11th Bersaglieri Battalion "Caprera" in 1976 was also affixed to the 7th Bersaglieri Regiment's flag. All four of the battalion's medals were also depicted on the regiment's coats of arms.

As the XI Cyclists Battalion had been a battalion of the 11th Bersaglieri Regiment the army decided to transfer the name of the 11th Bersaglieri Battalion "Caprera" to the 11th Bersaglieri Regiment. On 18 April 1997 the 27th Bersaglieri Battalion "Jamiano" of the 11th Bersaglieri Regiment was renamed 11th Bersaglieri Battalion "Caprera", while the battalion of the 7th Bersaglieri Regiment was renamed 10th Bersaglieri Battalion "Bezzecca". Consequently the three Silver Medals of Military Valor and the Bronze Medal of Army Valor of the 11th Bersaglieri Battalion "Caprera" were transferred from the flag of the 7th Bersaglieri Regiment to the flag of the 11th Bersaglieri Regiment, and the coats of arms of both regiments were updated.

== Organization ==
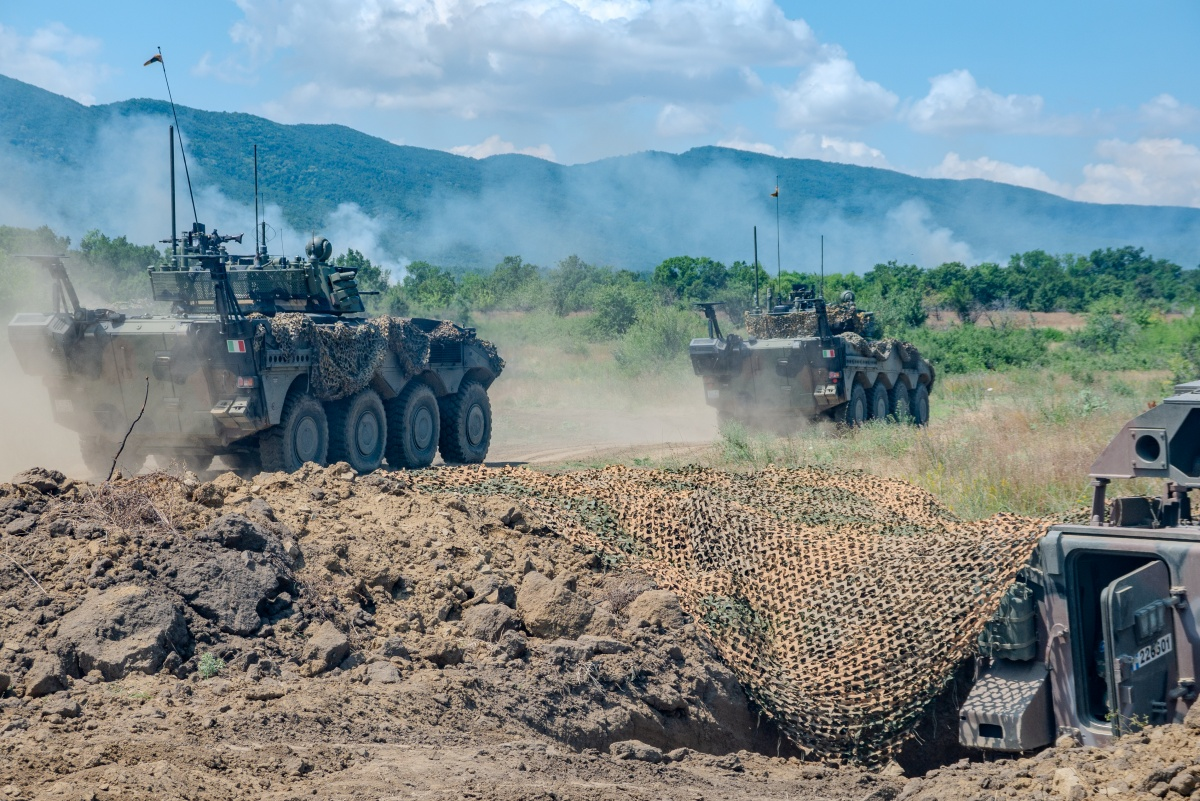
7th Bersaglieri Regiment Freccia IFVs during exercise "Alliance Wall 26" in Bulgaria in July 2026

As of 2026 the 7th Bersaglieri Regiment is organized as follows:

- 7th Bersaglieri Regiment, in Altamura
  - Command and Logistic Support Company
  - 10th Bersaglieri Battalion "Bezzecca"
    - 1st Bersaglieri Company
    - 2nd Bersaglieri Company
    - 3rd Bersaglieri Company
    - Maneuver Support Company

The regiment is equipped with Freccia wheeled infantry fighting vehicles. The Maneuver Support Company is equipped with Freccia mortar carriers with 120mm mortars and Freccia IFVs with Spike LR anti-tank guided missiles.

== See also ==
- Bersaglieri
