= Tiarno =

Tiarno may refer to 2 Italian villages of the province of Trento.

- Tiarno di Sopra, in the municipality of Ledro
- Tiarno di Sotto, in the municipality of Ledro
