= Palvico =

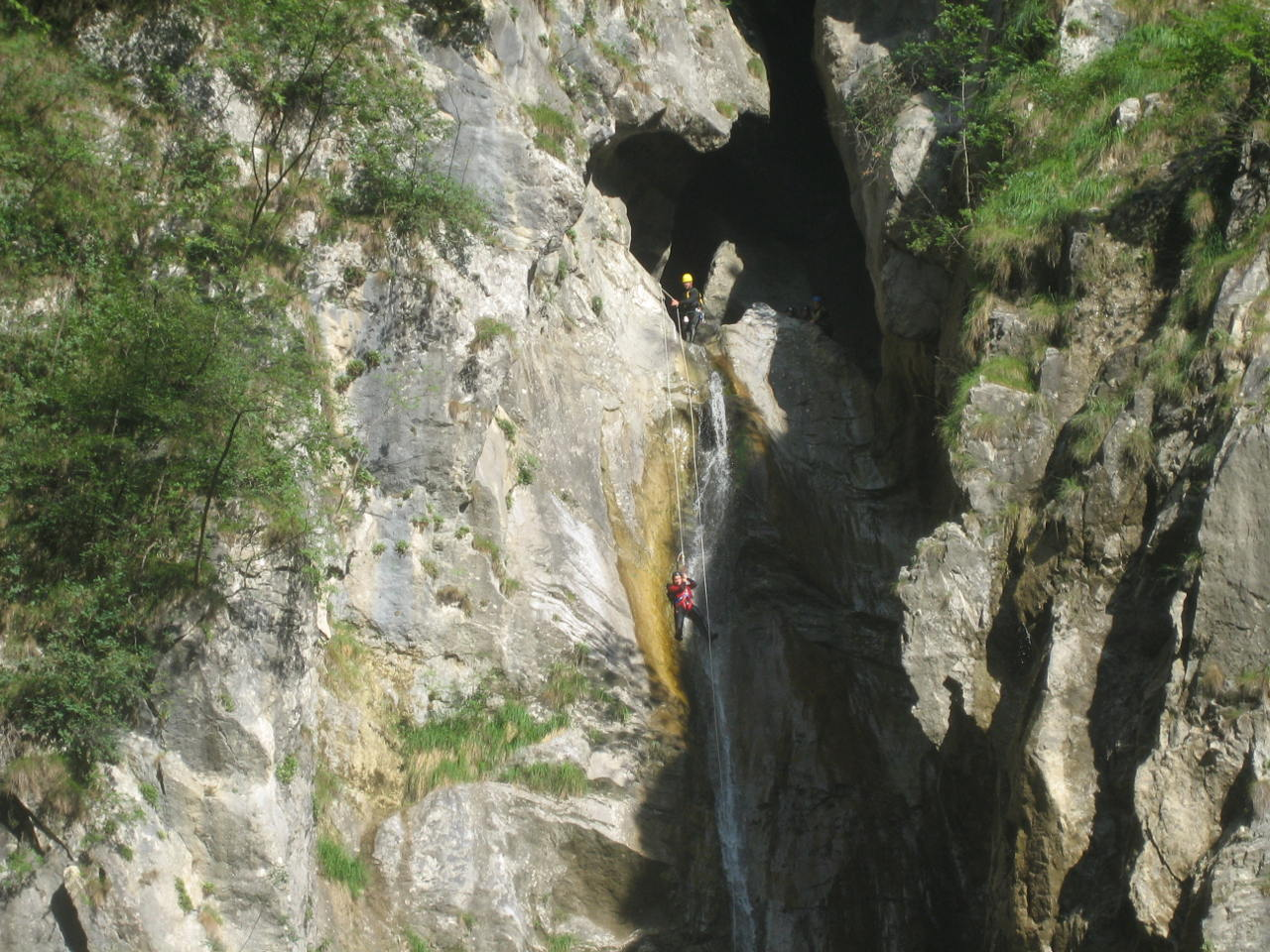
- Canyoning at the Buco della Morte

Location
- Country: Italy

Physical characteristics
- Source
  - location: Lago d'Ampola, Trentino
- Mouth
  - location: Chiese
- Length: 16 km (9.9 mi)

The Palvico stream (it. Torrente Palvico) originates as the outflow of Lake Ampola at an elevation of approximately 730 metres above sea level, in the area of Tiarno di Sopra (now part of the municipality of Ledro). It flows southwest through the valley of the same name toward Storo, descending to about 400 metres above sea level. Here it crosses the alluvial plain that it helped to form – though to a lesser extent – together with the Chiese River, into which it flows shortly before the latter empties into Lake Idro. The stream and the territory it passes through belong to the Chiese drainage basin. Among its main tributaries are the Rio Casina, Rio Bragone, Lorina stream, Rio Fontana Bianca, and Rio Retorto. The maximum discharge with a 200-year return period is 62.3 m³/s.

From Tiarno di Sopra to Storo, the Ampola Valley appears as a narrow gorge through which only the stream and the State Road 240 of Loppio and the Val di Ledro pass. As the Palvico flows toward Storo, it becomes a canyon, a popular destination for canyoning enthusiasts: after a series of small jumps, several descents of 15 to 20 metres follow, leading to a final waterfall of over 50 metres.

The “Consorzio Elettrico di Storo” (CEdiS), a cooperative society founded in 1904 by the heads of households in Storo, obtained a concession to divert water from the stream for a hydroelectric plant, which came into operation in 1905 with a modest output of 125 kW. The consortium survived the nationalization of the electricity sector in 1962.[3] It is currently authorized to draw an average of 1,303 L/s (litres per second), generating a total power of 2,524 kW, with an installed capacity of three Pelton turbines totalling 3,870 kW and one 315 kW Francis turbine. In 2008, the Palvico–Lorina hydroelectric system produced 19,447,176 kWh. For the purposes of calculating the minimum vital flow (DMV), the catchment area of the Palvico is 24.6 km², while that of its tributaries Lorina and Rio Torto is 15.4 km².

== Activities ==
The basins and drops, together with a limited waterflow make the Palvico a popular destination for canyoneers.
