= Lago d'Ampola =

Lake in Trentino, Italy

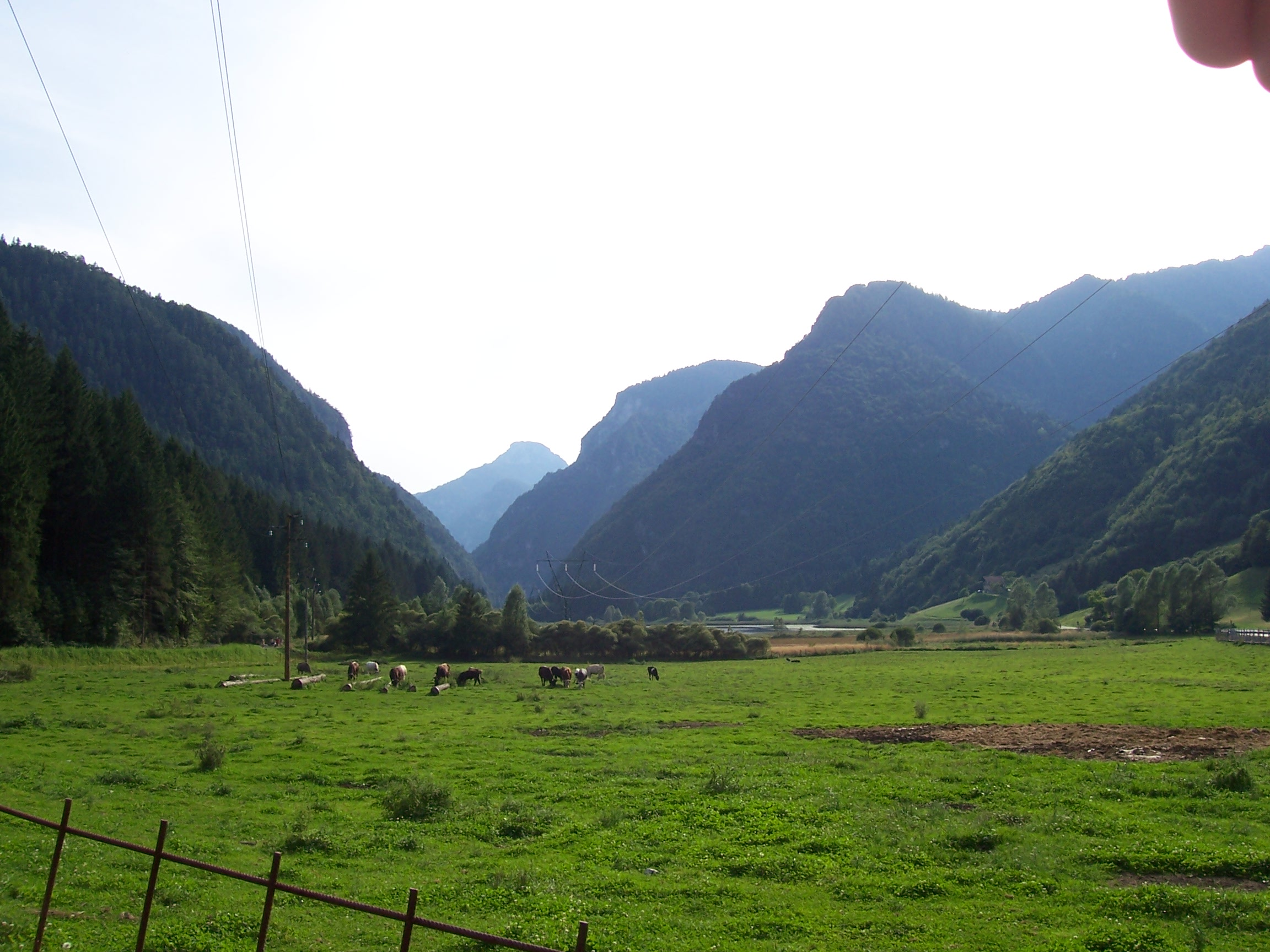

- Location within Italy
- Location: Tiarno di Sopra, Trentino
- Coordinates: 45.8706°N 10.652°E
- Primary inflows: rio valle Ovri
- Primary outflows: Palvico
- Basin countries: Italy
- Surface area: 0.5 km^{2} (0.19 sq mi)
- Surface elevation: 730 m (2,400 ft)

Lago d'Ampola is a lake at Tiarno di Sopra in Trentino, Italy. At an elevation of 730 m, its surface area is 0.5 km².

This lake and the surrounding wetland constitute a specific ecosystem hosting a peculiar flora and fauna. For that reason, the Autonomous Province of Trento declared this area as a protected biotope.
