= Ponale Hydroelectric Power Plant =

Hydroelectric power plant in Riva del Garda, Trentino, Italy

Coordinates: 45°52′59.29″N 10°50′16.92″E

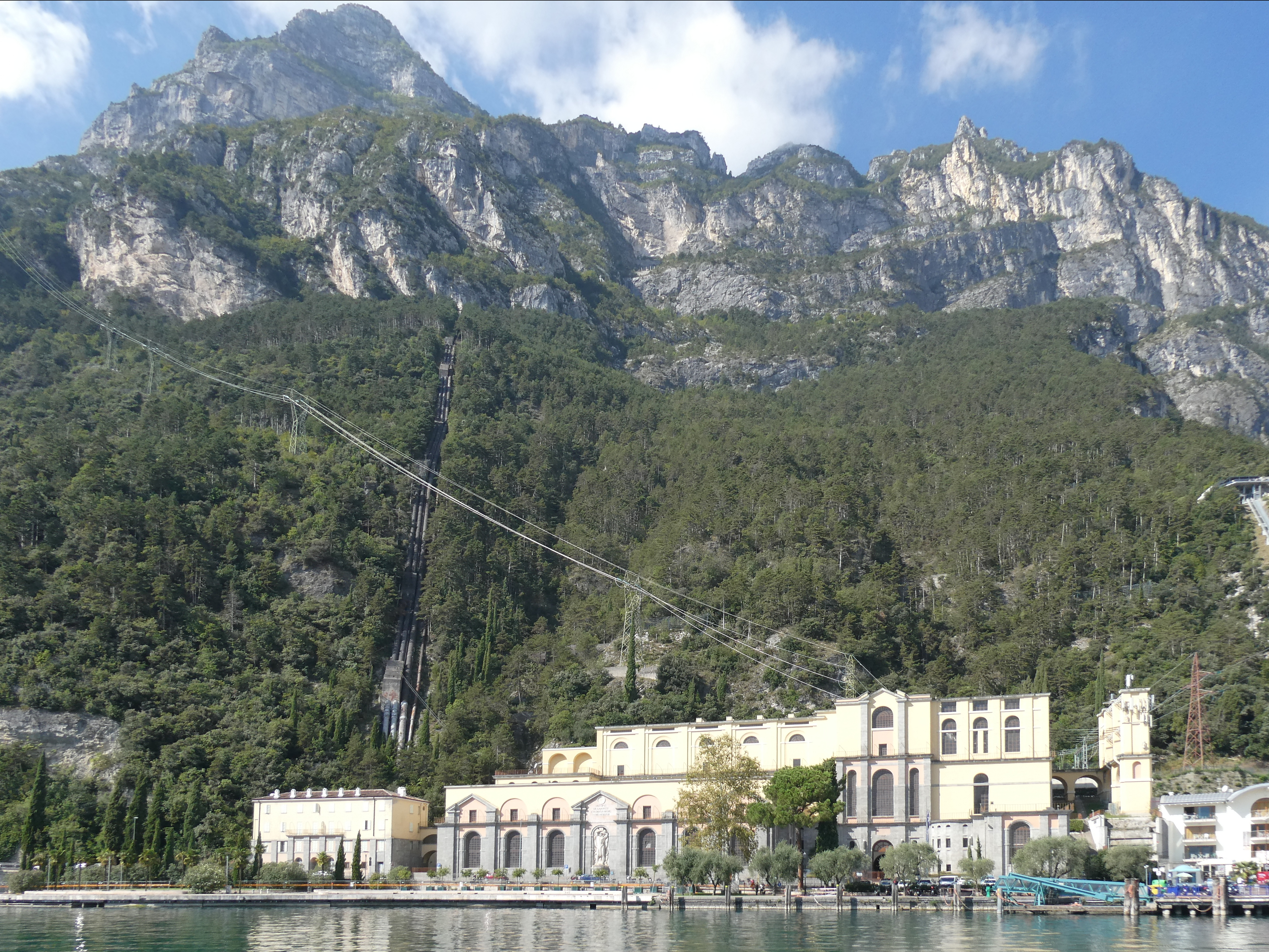

Ponale Hydroelectric Power Plant (Italian: Centrale idroelettrica del Ponale) is a pumped storage plant, located in city of Riva del Garda in the Italian province of Trentino, on River Ponale between Lake Ledro and Lake Garda. Its output capability is 76MW.

The station was built in 1925-1929 and, following rework of the pipes, underwent overhaul in 1998.

From Lake Ledro, the water is ducted several kilometers to penstocks at a point (close to the Chiesetta di Santa Barbara) almost directly above the power station buildings and machinery at Riva del Garda; from here it falls on a gradient approaching 3:1 to the turbines.

The station is known by the world record in high-rise concrete pumping during the reconstruction in 1994. The achieved record was 532m.

During construction of the plant, there was discovered the remains of a Bronze Age pile-dwelling village (over 10 000 piles) on the east of the Lake Ledro.

== See also ==
- "3D model of the station". Archived from the original on 18 October 2012.
- "Photos of the plant". Archived from the original on 4 November 2012.
