= Ponale road =

Notable trail in Italy

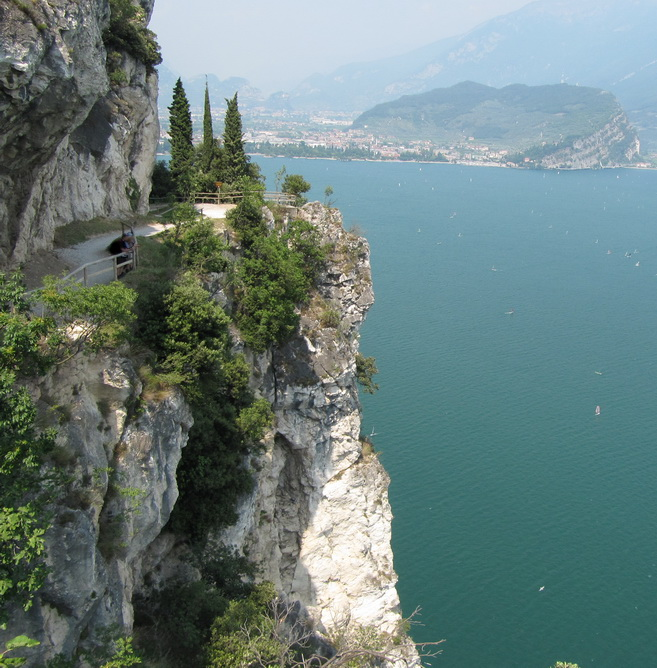
Ponale highway part with U-turns over Ponale valley

The Ponale road, Ponale highway or lately Alpine trail D 01 is a former highway that was the first road connection between the Garda Lake area and the Ledro valley.

== History ==
It was constructed by Giacomo Cis between 1848 and 1851 in the steep north-western ranges of the Garda Lake. Initially, it was fashioned out of the limestone which formed some of the rock formations on the mountains themselves. The road suffered from regular landslides, so a separate road tunnel has been built in 1998. Since then the road had been officially closed, but has been popular by hikers and mountain-bikers. In 2000 another landslide happened with various casualties, so the road had been closed again. Due to the immense popularity of the track with impressive views of the lake and its tunnels it reopened in 2004, however automobile traffic is not permitted.

The old rest station above the Ponale valley reopened in June 2014.

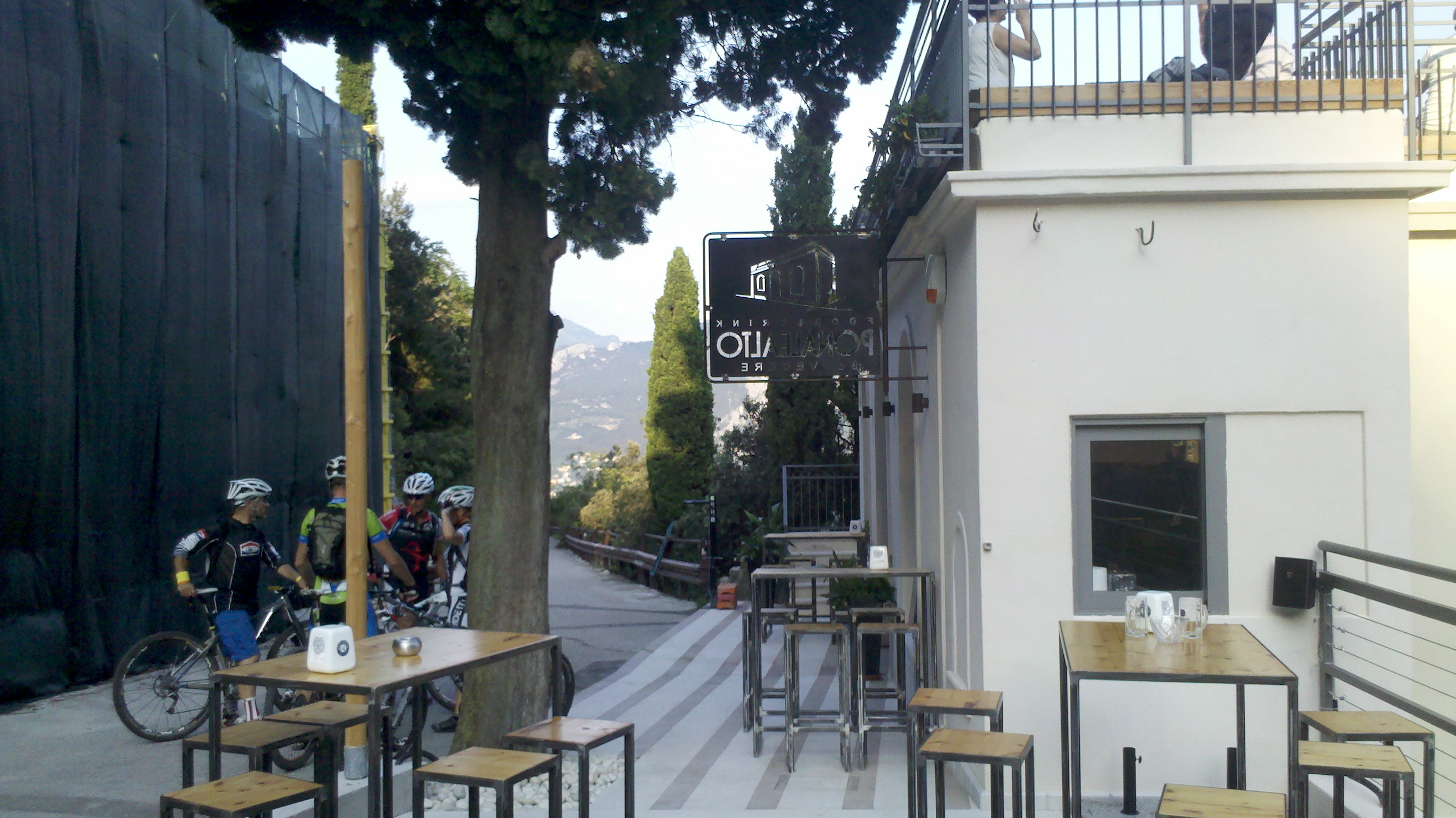
Ponale highway (Strada Ponale) with old renovated station
