= Ponale =

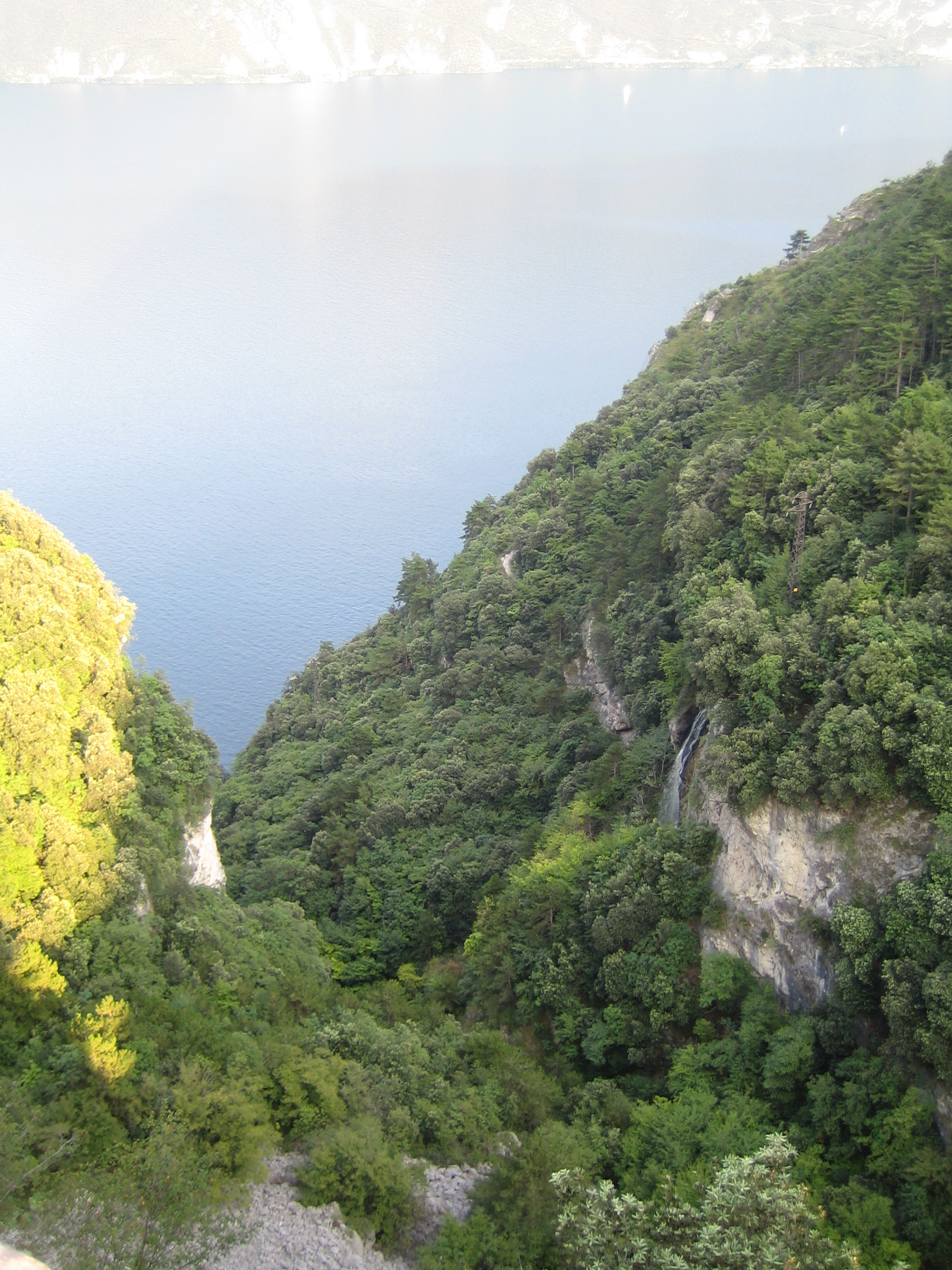
- Ponale valley close to lake Garda from old Ponale road. A tributary cascade can be seen to the right.

Location
- Country: Italy

Physical characteristics
- Source
  - location: Lake Ledro
  - elevation: 655 m (2,149 ft)
- Mouth: Lake Garda
  - coordinates: 45.8613°N 10.8328°E
  - elevation: 65 m (213 ft)
- Length: 7 km (4.3 mi)

Basin features
- Progression: Lake Garda→ Mincio→ Po→ Adriatic Sea

The Ponale is a 7-kilometre-long (4 mi) river originating in Lake Ledro (Lago di Ledro) in Trentino, Northern Italy.

The river first passes Molina di Ledro, Prè di Ledro and Biacesa, where feeding a fish farm.

Starting from Biacesa the Ponale enters a steep canyon, and after a cascade the Ponale flows into Lake Garda close to Porto del Ponale. An unpaved road, the Via Ponale, parallels the torrente, which is closed to motorists but has been used by cyclists since 2004.
