= Lago di Ledro =

Lake in Trentino, Italy

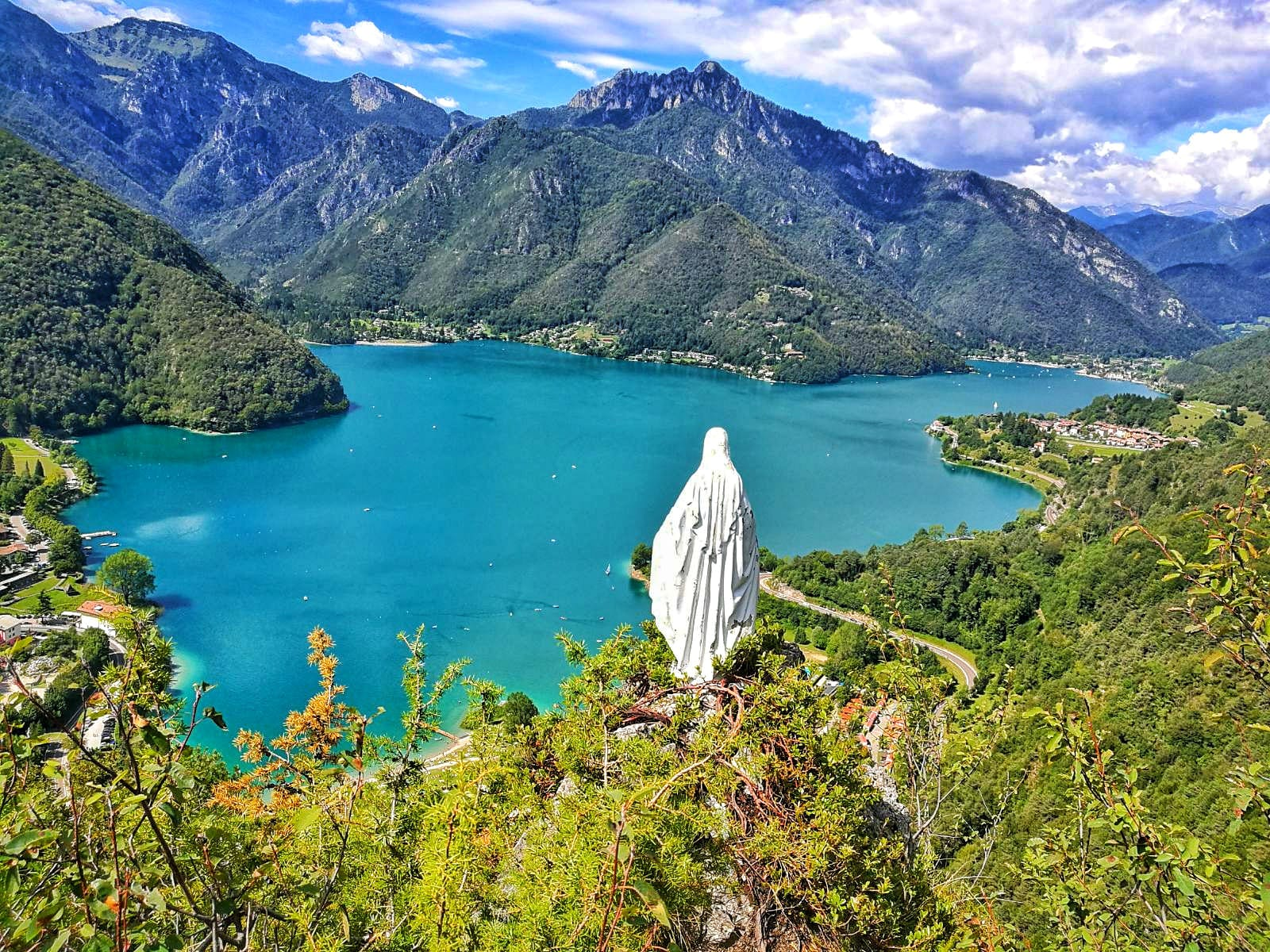

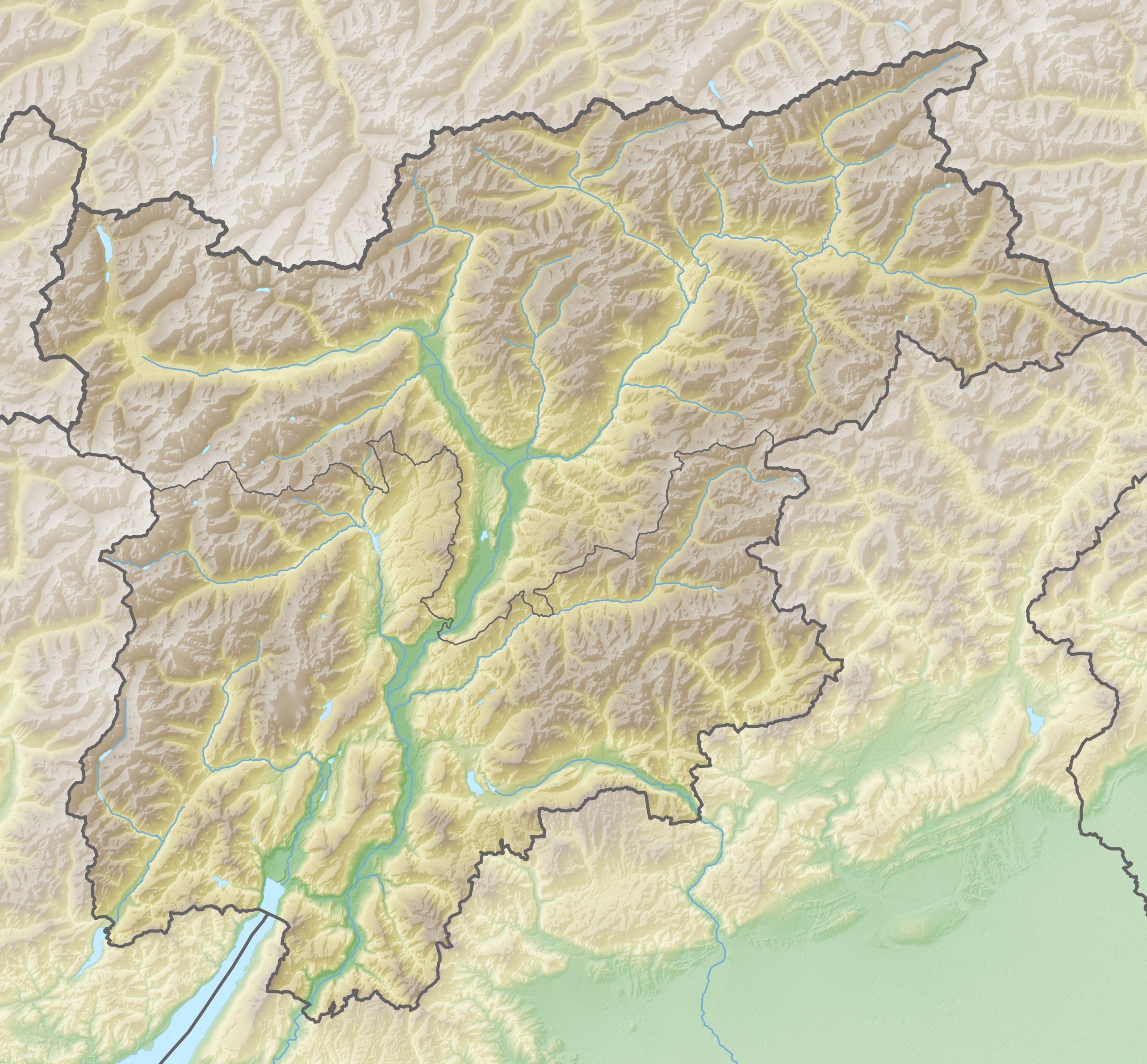
- Location within Trentino-Alto Adige/Südtirol
- Location: Trentino
- Coordinates: 45°52′36″N 10°45′2″E
- Primary inflows: Massangla, Assat di Pieve, Assat di Pur
- Primary outflows: Ponale
- Basin countries: Italy
- Max. length: 2.7 km (1.7 mi)
- Surface area: 2.187 km^{2} (0.844 sq mi)
- Average depth: 35 m (115 ft)
- Max. depth: 48 m (157 ft)
- Shore length^{1}: 8.9 km (5.5 mi)
- Surface elevation: 655 m (2,149 ft)
- ^{1} Shore length is not a well-defined measure.

Lago di Ledro is a lake in Trentino, northern Italy. The lake is at an elevation of 655 metres (2,149 ft), and its surface area is 2.187 km^{2} (0.844 sq mi).

Lake Ledro is reputed to be one of the cleanest lakes in Trentino, and during the summer it reaches a temperature of 24 °C (75 °F), attracting tourists with its four bathing banks.

In 2009 and 2011, the lake suffered from algal blooms, caused by Planktothrix.

== History ==
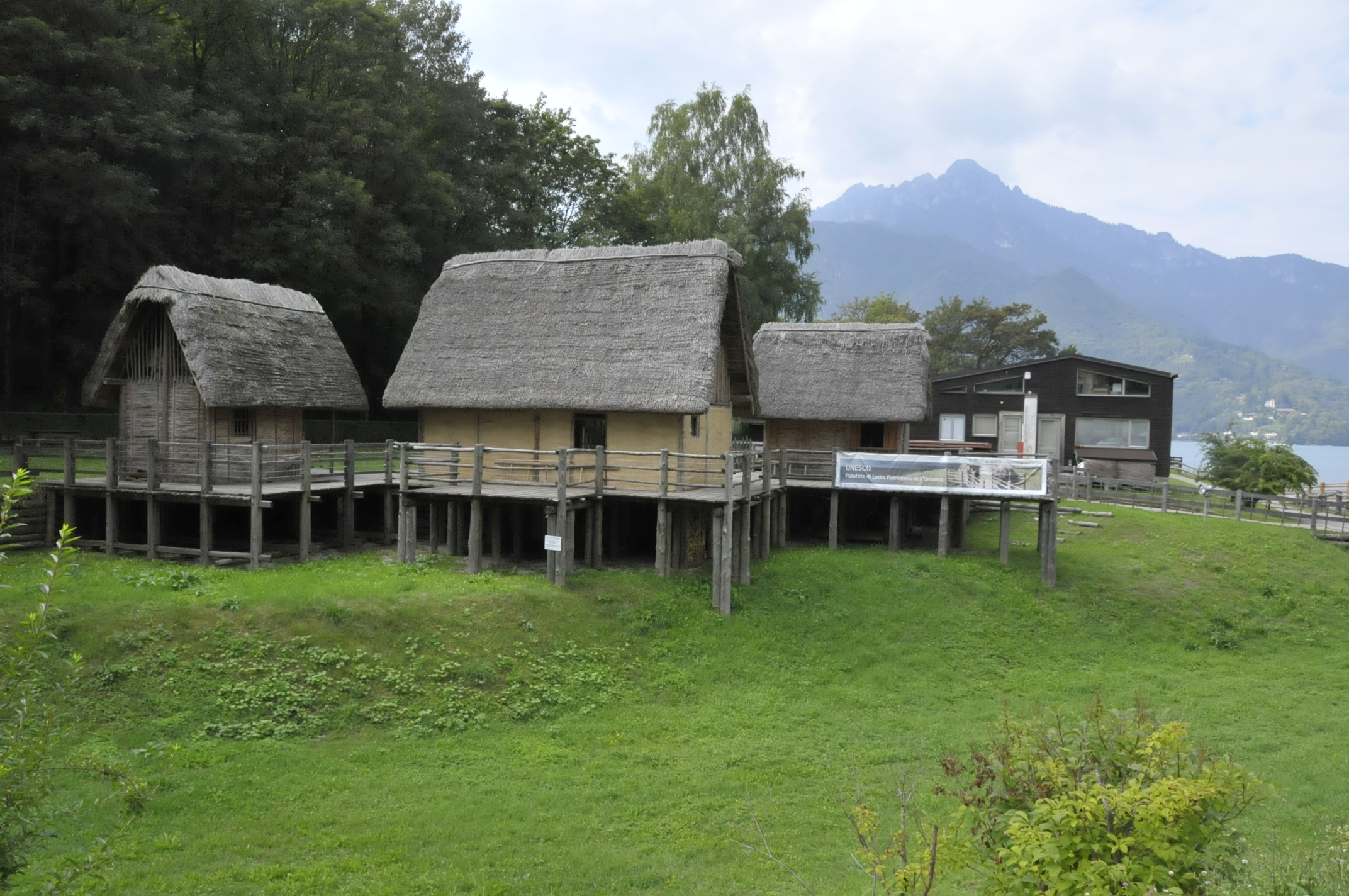
Reproductions of the prehistoric stilt houses on the bank of the Lake Ledro.

Lake Ledro originates from the deposition of a morainal bank during the fourth glacial era. Since 1929, the lake level has been regulated to suit the energy requirements of the hydroelectric power station of Riva del Garda, which uses the water of the lake to produce electricity on a pumped-storage basis.

The Lake's water sources are mainly underneath the lake. There are also tributaries (Massangla (at the West end of the lake, joined by the Torrente Assat of Pieve), Assat of Pur (from the South, at the East end of the lake), and Rio di Val Molini (at the Northern corner at the West end of the lake)), although these are dry for most of the year.

At Lake Ledro is the site of an archaeological area with an associated museum and botanical garden situated on the River Ponale flowing out of the lake to the east. The area was discovered in 1929 when the level of the lake was lowered to supply the hydroelectric plant being built at Riva del Garda. The archaeological site still shows many features and traditions of the Neolithic period, but also impulses of the Early Bronze Age. It is one of the most important in Europe for evidencing the extent and wealth of the manufactures of its time.

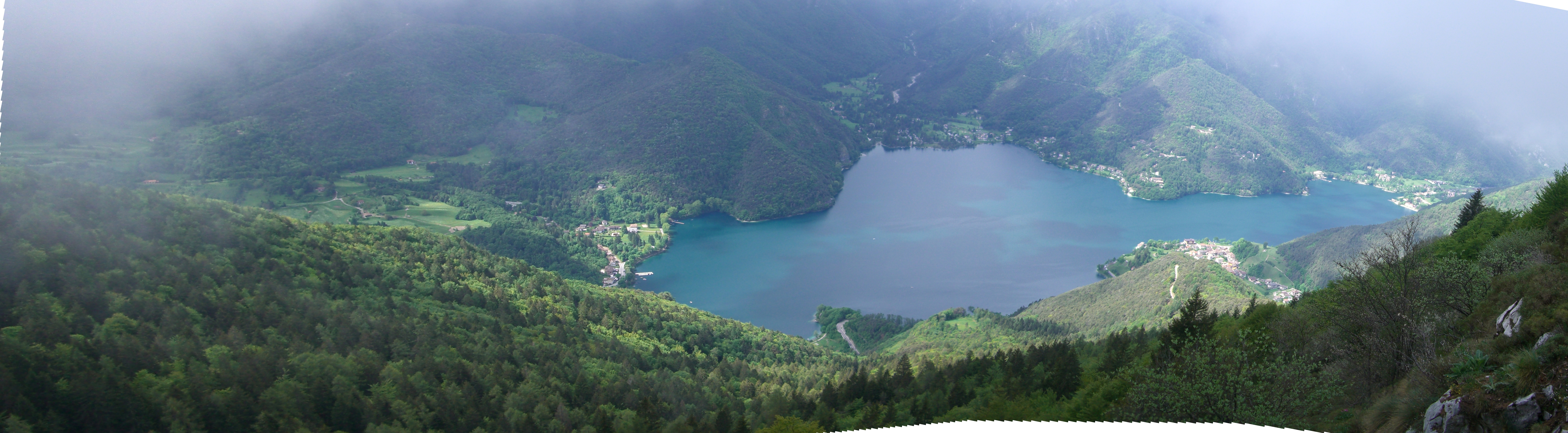
Panorama of the lake.

== Bibliography ==
- Rageth, Jürg (1974). "Der Lago di Ledro im Trentino und seine Beziehungen zu den alpinen und mitteleuropäischen Kulturen" [The Lago di Ledro in Trentino and its relationship with Alpine and Central European cultures]. Bericht der Römisch-Germanischen Kommission. 55 (1): 73–259.
