= Molina di Ledro =

- Frazione
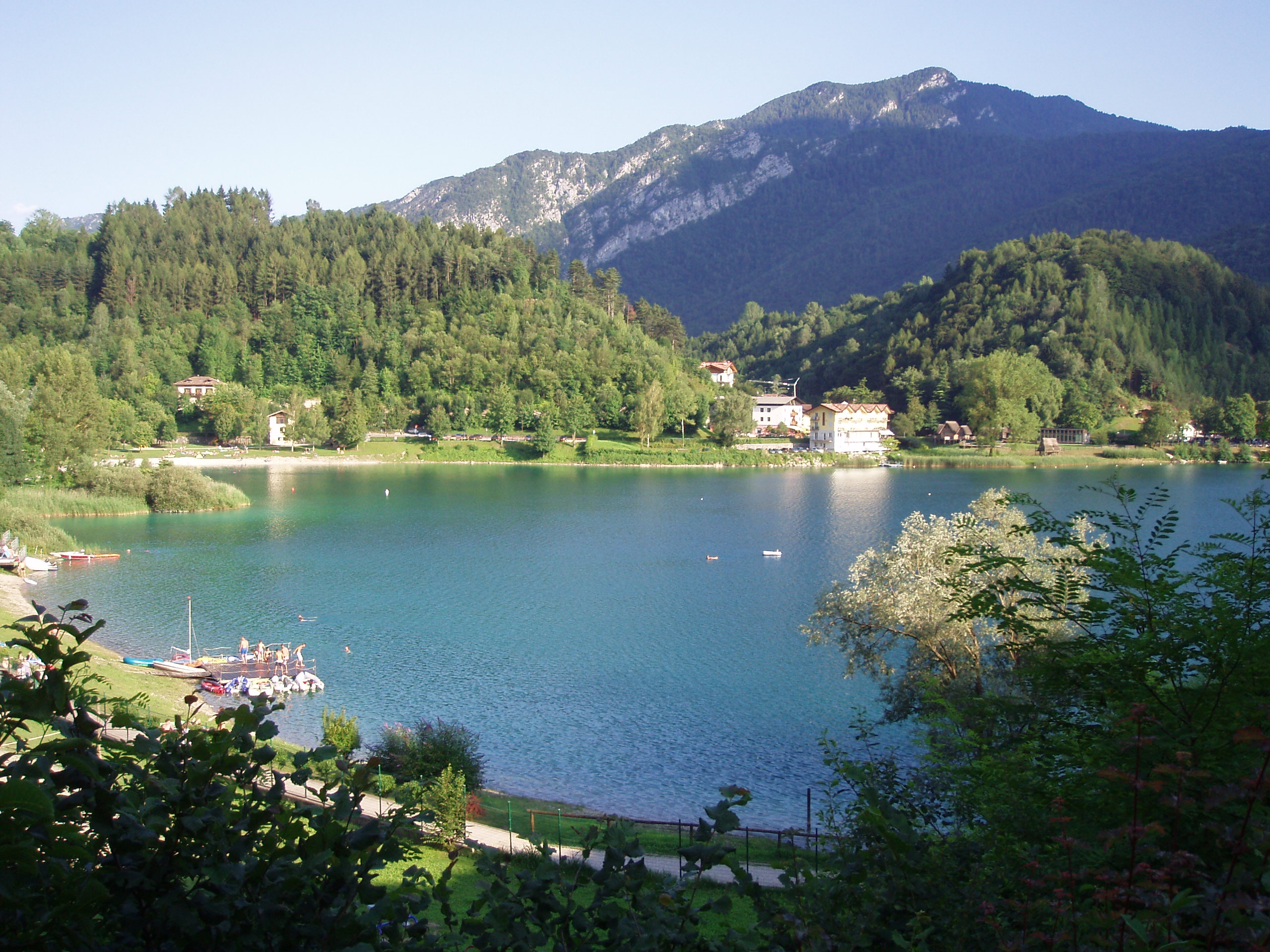
- Molina di Ledro - view

- Location of Molina di Ledro in Italy
- Coordinates: 45°52′N 10°47′E
- Country: Italy
- Region: Trentino-Alto Adige/Südtirol
- Province: Trentino (TN)
- Comune: Ledro

Area (referred to the former municipality)
  - Total: 39.5 km^{2} (15.3 sq mi)

Population (Dec. 2004)
  - Total: 1,519
  - Density: 38.5/km^{2} (99.6/sq mi)
- Time zone: UTC+1 (CET)
  - Summer (DST): UTC+2 (CEST)
- Postal code: 38060
- Dialing code: 0464

Molina di Ledro was a comune (municipality) in Trentino in the Italian region Trentino-Alto Adige/Südtirol. On January 1, 2010 it merged (with Pieve di Ledro, Bezzecca, Concei, Tiarno di Sopra and Tiarno di Sotto) in the new municipality of Ledro. It is the most populated frazione of the municipality. It is located about 35 km southwest of Trento.

== Main sights ==
- Giardino Botanico Preistorico di Molina di Ledro, a botanical garden of Bronze Age food plants

== People ==
- Andrea Maffei
