= Bezzecca =

- Frazione
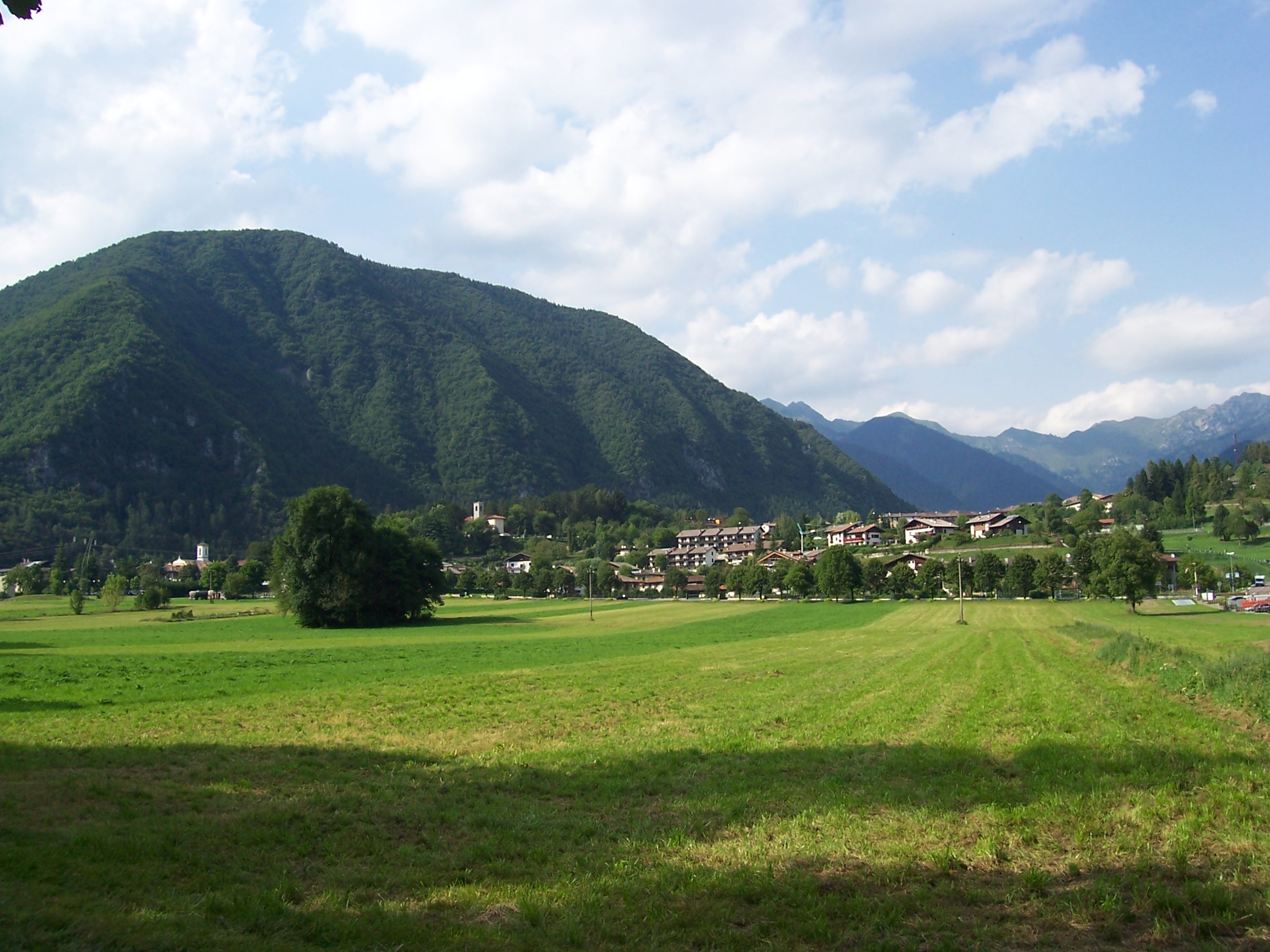
- Panoramic view

- Location of Bezzecca in Italy
- Coordinates: 45°54′N 10°43′E
- Country: Italy
- Region: Trentino-Alto Adige/Südtirol
- Province: Trentino (TN)
- Comune: Ledro

Area (referred to the former municipality)
  - Total: 17.7 km^{2} (6.8 sq mi)

Population (Dec. 2004)
  - Total: 587
  - Density: 33.2/km^{2} (85.9/sq mi)
- Time zone: UTC+1 (CET)
  - Summer (DST): UTC+2 (CEST)
- Postal code: 38060
- Dialing code: 0464

Bezzecca was a comune (municipality) in Trentino in the Italian region Trentino-Alto Adige/Südtirol. On January 1, 2010 it merged (with Pieve di Ledro, Concei, Molina di Ledro, Tiarno di Sopra and Tiarno di Sotto) in the new municipality of Ledro. It is located about 35 km southwest of Trento.

== History ==
On July 21, 1866 the village was the theatre of a battle part of the Third Italian War of Independence. It was fought after the Battle of Pieve di Ledro.
