= Ledro =

- Comune
- Comune di Ledro
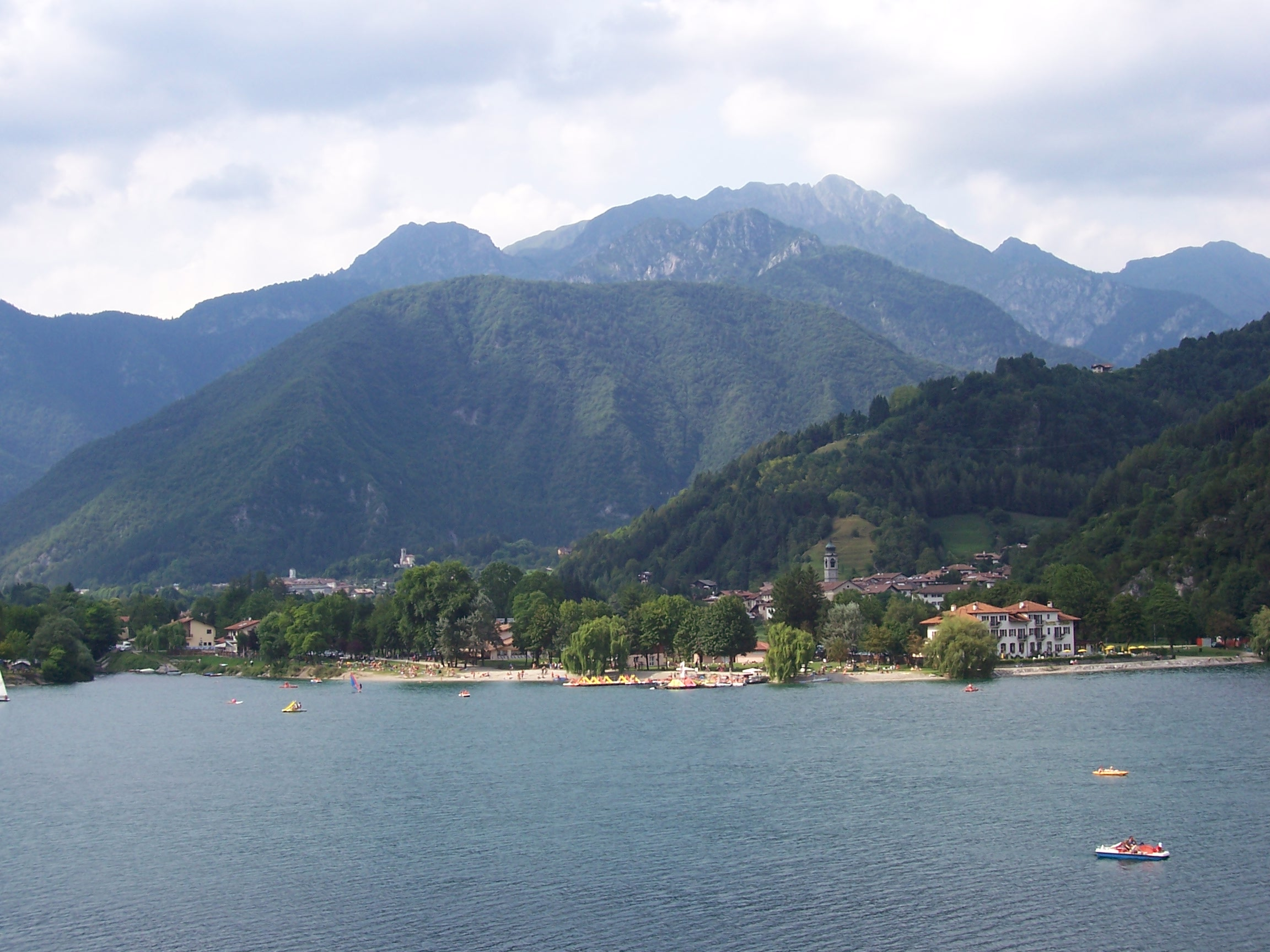
- View of Pieve di Ledro and Bezzecca on Lake Ledro

- Location within Italy Location within Trentino-Alto Adige/Südtirol
- Coordinates: 45°53′N 10°44′E
- Country: Italy
- Region: Trentino-Alto Adige/Südtirol
- Province: Trentino (TN)
- Frazioni: Bezzecca, Biacesa, Concei, Enguiso, Legos, Lenzumo, Locca, Mezzolago, Molina di Ledro, Pieve di Ledro (seat), Pré di Ledro, Tiarno di Sopra, Tiarno di Sotto.

Government
  - Mayor: Claudio Oliari

Area
  - Total: 154.6 km^{2} (59.7 sq mi)
- Elevation: 660 m (2,170 ft)

Population (2026)
  - Total: 5,478
  - Density: 35.43/km^{2} (91.77/sq mi)
- Demonym: Ledrensi
- Time zone: UTC+1 (CET)
  - Summer (DST): UTC+2 (CEST)
- Postal code: 38060
- Dialing code: 0464
- Website: Official website

Ledro (in local dialect: Léder) is an Italian comune (municipality) in Trentino in northern Italy. It was created on 1 January 2010 by the merger of the former comuni of Pieve di Ledro, Bezzecca, Concei, Molina di Ledro, Tiarno di Sopra and Tiarno di Sotto.

== History ==
The municipality was created after a referendum, called on 30 November 2008, in all the 6 comuni of the Ledro Valley.

== Geography ==
The municipality counts the civil parishes (frazioni) of Bezzecca, Biacesa, Concei, Enguiso, Legos, Lenzumo, Locca, Mezzolago, Molina di Ledro, Pieve di Ledro (the municipal seat), Pré di Ledro, Tiarno di Sopra, Tiarno di Sotto.

Ledro borders with the municipalities of Bleggio Superiore, Bondone, Cimego, Condino, Fiavè, Limone sul Garda (BS), Magasa (BS), Nago-Torbole, Riva del Garda, Pieve di Bono, Storo, Tenno, Tione di Trento, Tremosine (BS) and Zuclo.

== Main sights ==
- Lake Ledro, not too far from the Lake Garda
- Giardino Botanico Preistorico di Molina di Ledro, a botanical garden of Bronze Age food plants

== Personalities ==
- Andrea Maffei

== Twin municipalities ==
- Müllheim, Germany
- Buštěhrad, Czech Republic
- Doksy, Czech Republic
- Chyňava, Czech Republic
- Milín, Czech Republic
- Nový Knín, Czech Republic
- Příbram, Czech Republic
- Ptice, Czech Republic
- Všeň, Czech Republic

== World Heritage Site ==
It is home to one or more prehistoric pile-dwelling (or stilt house) settlements that are part of the Prehistoric Pile dwellings around the Alps UNESCO World Heritage Site.
