= Pieve di Ledro =

- Frazione
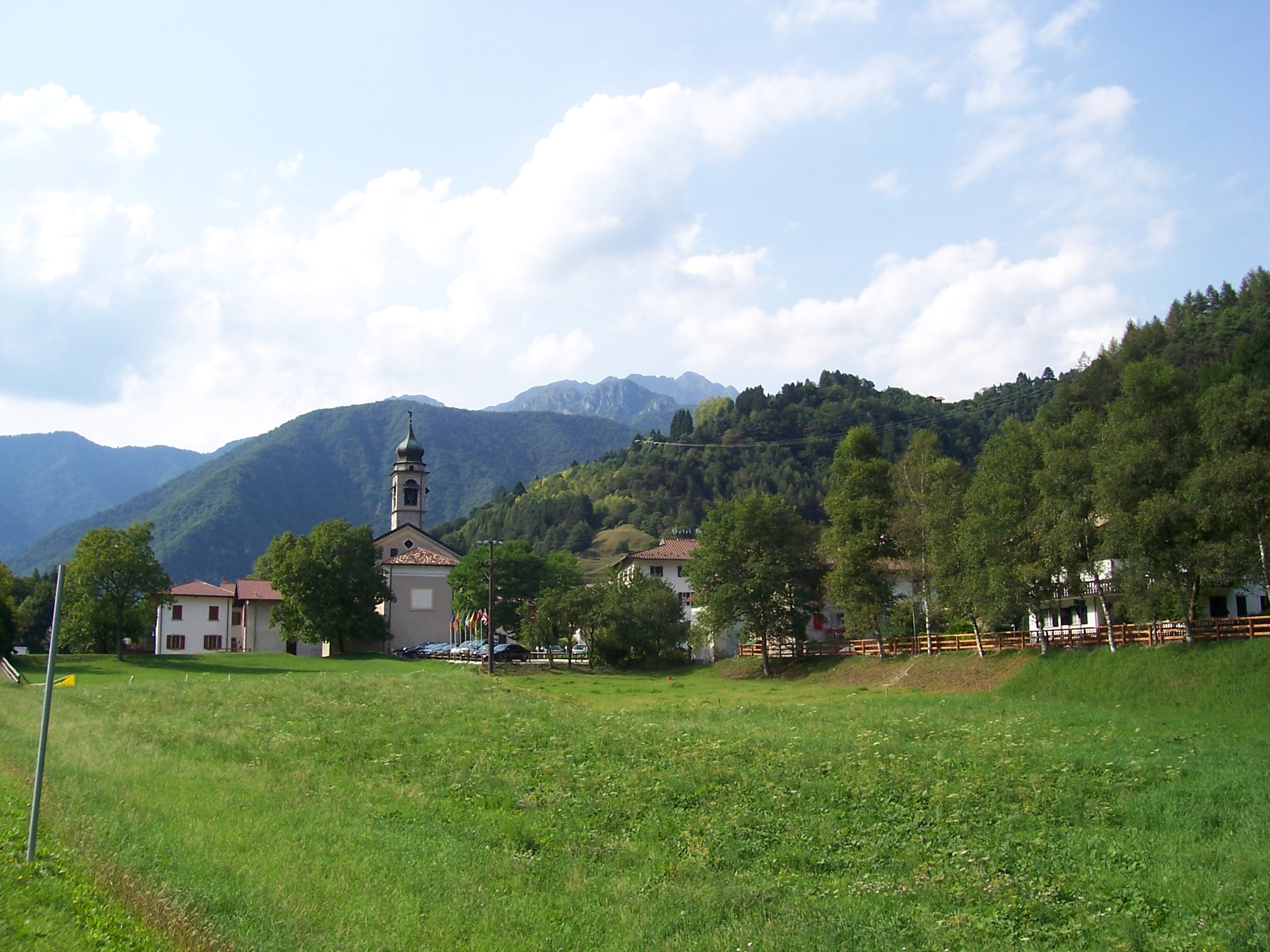
- Panoramic view

- Location of Pieve di Ledro in Italy
- Coordinates: 45°53′N 10°44′E
- Country: Italy
- Region: Trentino-Alto Adige/Südtirol
- Province: Trentino (TN)
- Comune: Ledro

Area (referred to the former municipality)
  - Total: 19.0 km^{2} (7.3 sq mi)

Population (Dec. 2004)
  - Total: 585
  - Density: 30.8/km^{2} (79.7/sq mi)
- Time zone: UTC+1 (CET)
  - Summer (DST): UTC+2 (CEST)
- Postal code: 38060
- Dialing code: 0464

Pieve di Ledro was a comune (municipality) in Trentino in the Italian region Trentino-Alto Adige/Südtirol. On 1 January 2010, it merged (with Bezzecca, Concei, Molina di Ledro, Tiarno di Sopra and Tiarno di Sotto) in the new municipality of Ledro, as its municipal seat. It is located about 35 km southwest of Trento.

On 18 July 1866, the village was the theatre of a battle part of the Third Italian War of Independence. It was the prelude of the Battle of Bezzecca.
