= Tiarno di Sotto =

- Frazione
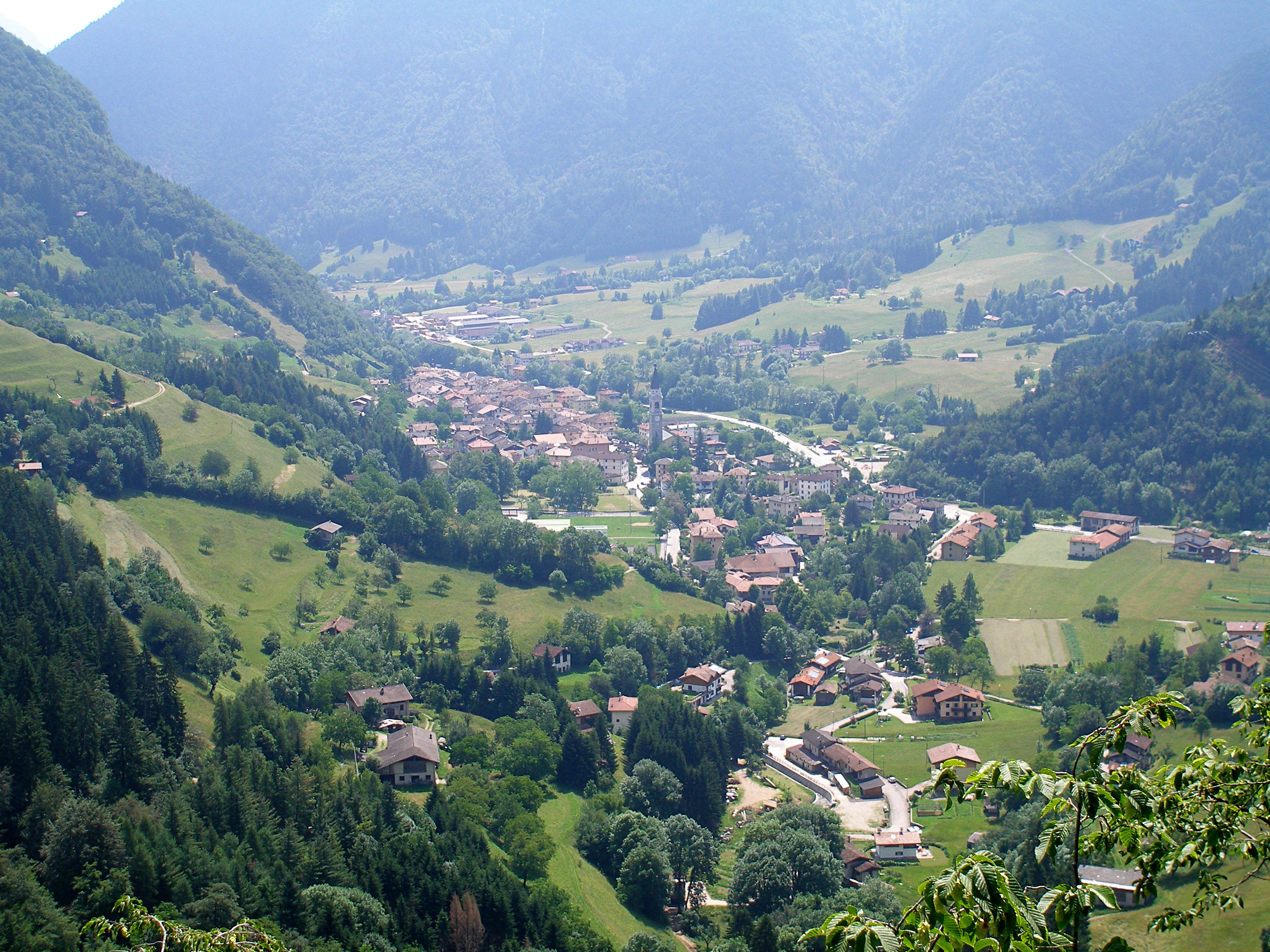

- Location of Tiarno di Sotto in Italy
- Coordinates: 45°54′N 10°41′E
- Country: Italy
- Region: Trentino-Alto Adige/Südtirol
- Province: Trentino (TN)
- Comune: Ledro

Area (referred to the former municipality)
  - Total: 9.2 km^{2} (3.6 sq mi)
- Elevation: 728 m (2,388 ft)

Population (Dec. 2004)
  - Total: 704
  - Density: 77/km^{2} (200/sq mi)
- Demonym: Tiarnesi or ledrensi
- Time zone: UTC+1 (CET)
  - Summer (DST): UTC+2 (CEST)
- Postal code: 38060
- Dialing code: 0464

Tiarno di Sotto was a comune (municipality) in the Trentino in the Italian region Trentino-Alto Adige/Südtirol. On January 1, 2010 it merged (with Pieve di Ledro, Bezzecca, Concei, Molina di Ledro and Tiarno di Sopra) in the new municipality of Ledro. It is located about 40 km southwest of Trento.
