= Tiarno di Sopra =

- Frazione
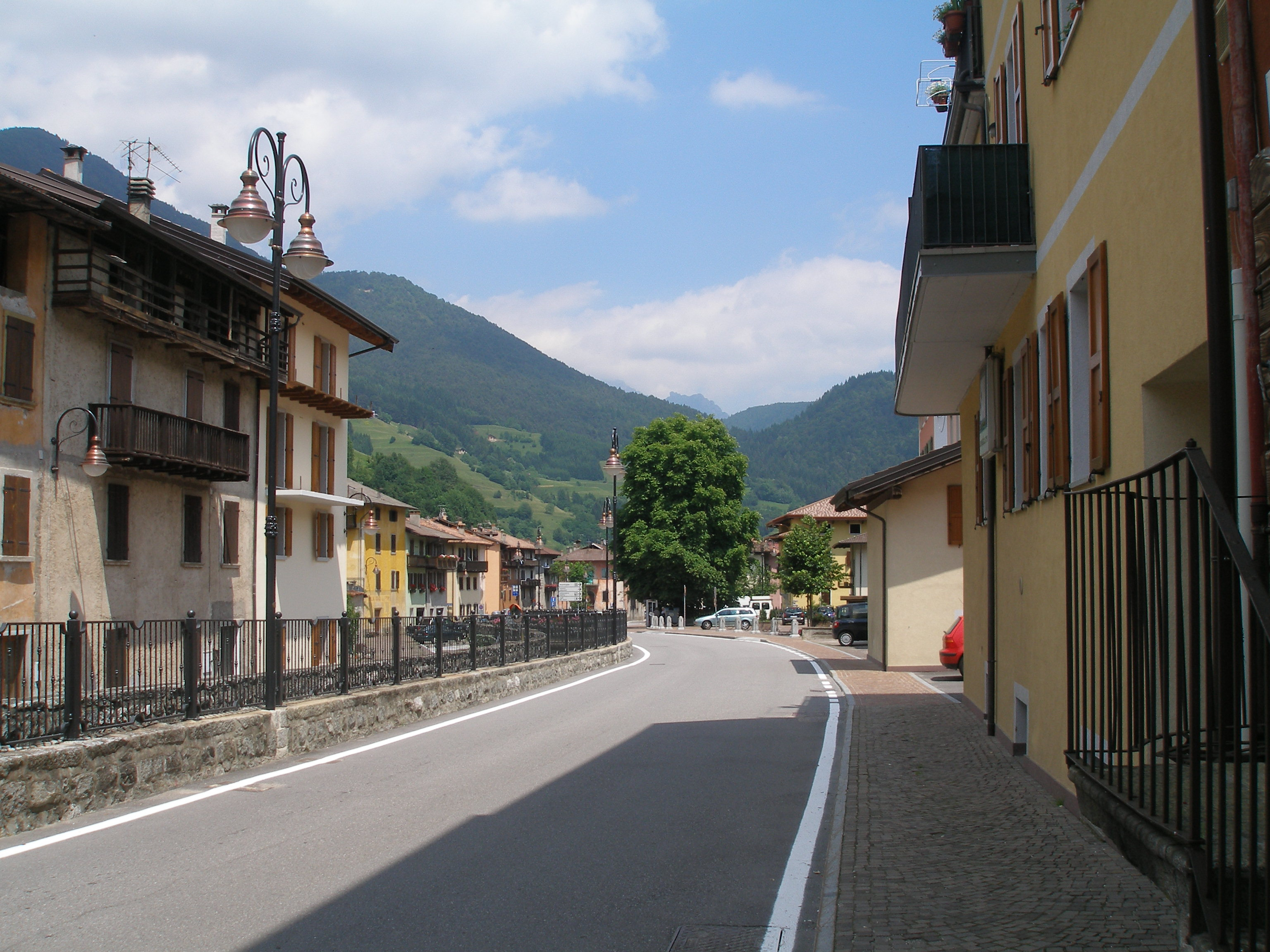

- Location of Tiarno di Sopra in Italy
- Coordinates: 45°53′N 10°40′E
- Country: Italy
- Region: Trentino-Alto Adige/Südtirol
- Province: Trentino (TN)
- Comune: Ledro

Area (referred to the former municipality)
  - Total: 38.7 km^{2} (14.9 sq mi)

Population (Dec. 2004)
  - Total: 1,019
  - Density: 26.3/km^{2} (68.2/sq mi)
- Time zone: UTC+1 (CET)
  - Summer (DST): UTC+2 (CEST)
- Postal code: 38060
- Dialing code: 0464

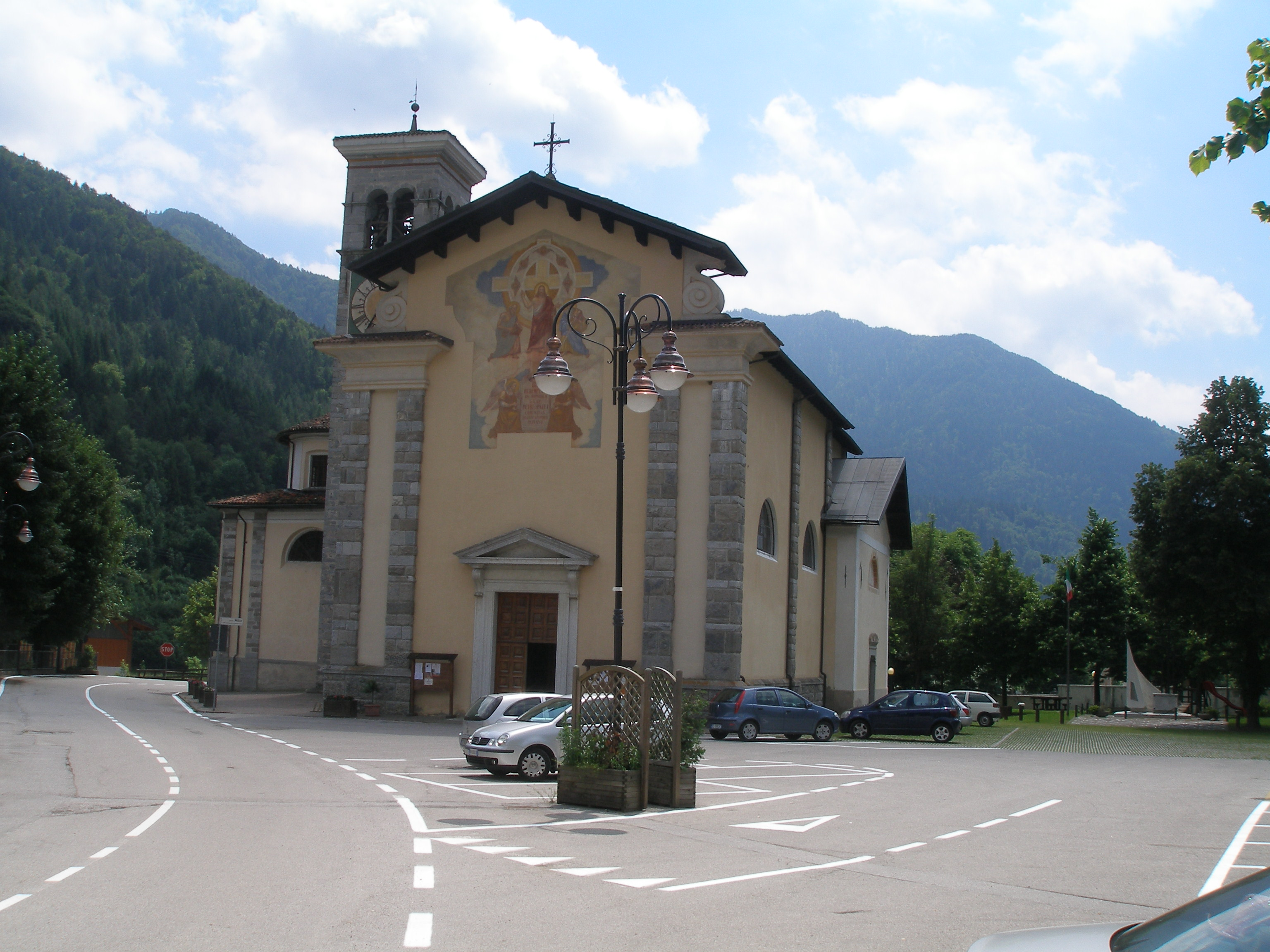
Tiarno di Sopra (Ledro, Italy) - the church of Saints Peter and Paul

Tiarno di Sopra was a comune (municipality) in Trentino in the Italian region Trentino-Alto Adige/Südtirol. On January 1, 2010, it merged (with Pieve di Ledro, Bezzecca, Concei, Molina di Ledro and Tiarno di Sotto) in the new municipality of Ledro. It is located about 40 km southwest of Trento.
