= Giardino Botanico Preistorico di Molina di Ledro =

Botanical garden in Italy

Coordinates: 45°52′N 10°47′E

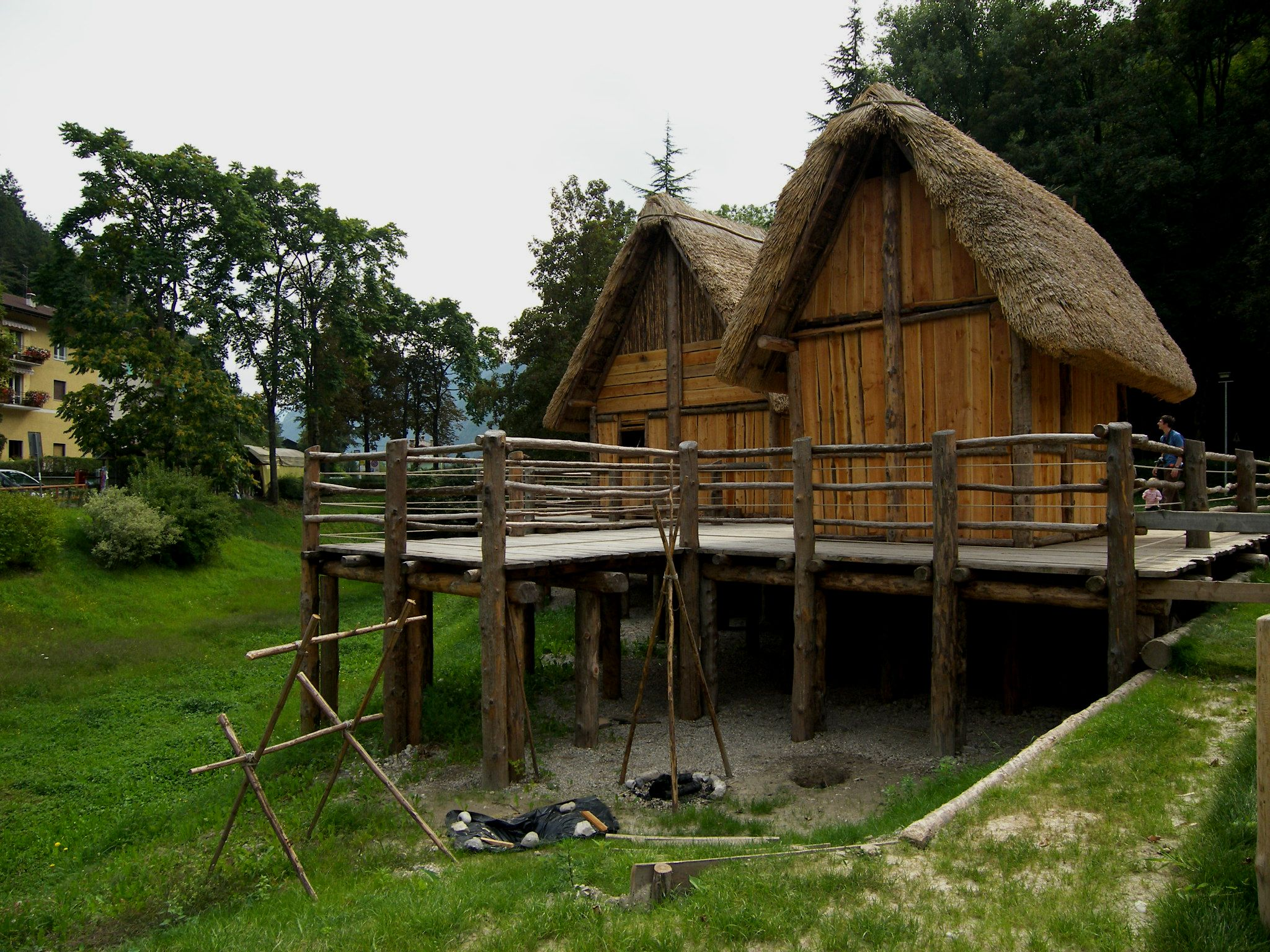
Palafitte-Lago di Ledro

The Giardino Botanico Preistorico di Molina di Ledro is a botanical garden on the grounds of the Museo delle Palafitte del Lago di Ledro, located in Val di Ledro near Lake Garda at Via Lungolago, 1, Molina di Ledro, Trentino, Italy. It is open daily in the warmer months; an admission fee is charged.

The garden was established in 1994 by the Museo delle Palafitte del Lago di Ledro, and contains cultivated plants that reflect Bronze Age archaeological finds at the site: seeds, dried fruits, and food remnants. Six flowerbeds contain archaic breeds of cereal grains, including barley and wheat, from seeds provided by institutes specializing in the conservation of plant genetic heritage. The garden also contains wild food plants such as berries and fruit.

== See also ==
- List of botanical gardens in Italy
