= List of municipalities of Trentino-Alto Adige/Südtirol =

Location of Trentino-Alto Adige/Südtirol within Italy

Provinces of Trentino-Alto Adige/Südtirol

The following is a list of the municipalities (comuni) of the autonomous region of Trentino-Alto Adige/Südtirol in Italy.

There are 282 municipalities in Trentino-Alto Adige/Südtirol as of 2026:

- 115 in the Province of South Tyrol
- 167 in the Province of Trentino

== List ==
Municipality	Province	Population (2026)	Area (km²)	Density
Ala	Trento	8,898	119.87	74.2
Albiano	Trento	1,549	9.96	155.5
Aldeno	Trento	3,360	8.97	374.6
Aldino	Bolzano	1,609	62.69	25.7
Altavalle	Trento	1,645	33.56	49.0
Altopiano della Vigolana	Trento	5,201	45.03	115.5
Amblar-Don	Trento	554	19.96	27.8
Andalo	Trento	1,237	11.38	108.7
Andriano	Bolzano	1,058	4.89	216.4
Anterivo	Bolzano	388	11.06	35.1
Appiano sulla Strada del Vino	Bolzano	15,062	59.45	253.4
Arco	Trento	17,747	63.22	280.7
Avelengo	Bolzano	823	27.40	30.0
Avio	Trento	4,118	68.90	59.8
Badia	Bolzano	3,589	83.18	43.1
Barbian	Bolzano	1,788	24.51	72.9
Baselga di Pinè	Trento	5,326	41.07	129.7
Bedollo	Trento	1,500	27.46	54.6
Besenello	Trento	2,834	25.94	109.3
Bieno	Trento	481	11.71	41.1
Bleggio Superiore	Trento	1,545	32.67	47.3
Bocenago	Trento	410	8.45	48.5
Bolzano	Bolzano	106,901	52.29	2,044.4
Bondone	Trento	627	19.19	32.7
Borgo Chiese	Trento	1,926	53.71	35.9
Borgo d'Anaunia	Trento	2,601	63.23	41.1
Borgo Lares	Trento	734	22.63	32.4
Borgo Valsugana	Trento	7,252	52.37	138.5
Braies	Bolzano	690	90.25	7.6
Brennero	Bolzano	2,434	114.29	21.3
Brentonico	Trento	4,184	57.14	73.2
Bresimo	Trento	240	41.01	5.9
Bressanone	Bolzano	23,350	84.70	275.7
Bronzolo	Bolzano	2,824	7.54	374.5
Brunico	Bolzano	17,166	45.00	381.5
Caderzone Terme	Trento	692	18.61	37.2
Caines	Bolzano	386	1.63	236.8
Calceranica al Lago	Trento	1,397	3.39	412.1
Caldaro sulla Strada del Vino	Bolzano	8,301	48.04	172.8
Caldes	Trento	1,122	20.81	53.9
Caldonazzo	Trento	4,010	21.41	187.3
Calliano	Trento	2,057	10.20	201.7
Campitello di Fassa	Trento	661	25.02	26.4
Campo di Trens	Bolzano	2,811	95.39	29.5
Campo Tures	Bolzano	5,877	163.98	35.8
Campodenno	Trento	1,532	25.02	61.2
Canal San Bovo	Trento	1,484	125.68	11.8
Canazei	Trento	1,903	67.02	28.4
Capriana	Trento	598	12.82	46.6
Carisolo	Trento	895	25.12	35.6
Carzano	Trento	518	1.82	284.6
Castel Condino	Trento	211	34.83	6.1
Castel Ivano	Trento	3,309	53.79	61.5
Castelbello-Ciardes	Bolzano	2,418	11.10	217.8
Castello Tesino	Trento	1,157	54.56	21.2
Castello-Molina di Fiemme	Trento	2,327	112.84	20.6
Castelnuovo	Trento	1,088	13.15	82.7
Castelrotto	Bolzano	7,062	117.90	59.9
Cavalese	Trento	4,026	45.38	88.7
Cavareno	Trento	1,155	9.48	121.8
Cavedago	Trento	609	10.03	60.7
Cavedine	Trento	3,103	38.23	81.2
Cavizzana	Trento	231	3.38	68.3
Cembra Lisignago	Trento	2,374	24.10	98.5
Cermes	Bolzano	1,653	6.62	249.7
Chienes	Bolzano	3,067	33.68	91.1
Chiusa	Bolzano	5,225	51.29	101.9
Cimone	Trento	743	9.81	75.7
Cinte Tesino	Trento	352	30.30	11.6
Cis	Trento	294	5.50	53.5
Civezzano	Trento	4,177	15.67	266.6
Cles	Trento	7,480	39.17	191.0
Comano Terme	Trento	3,059	68.11	44.9
Commezzadura	Trento	1,005	22.03	45.6
Contà	Trento	1,423	19.48	73.0
Cornedo all'Isarco	Bolzano	3,447	40.61	84.9
Cortaccia sulla Strada del Vino	Bolzano	2,238	29.27	76.5
Cortina sulla Strada del Vino	Bolzano	676	2.00	338.0
Corvara in Badia	Bolzano	1,438	38.92	36.9
Croviana	Trento	677	4.99	135.7
Curon Venosta	Bolzano	2,398	209.65	11.4
Dambel	Trento	391	5.15	75.9
Denno	Trento	1,246	10.64	117.1
Dimaro Folgarida	Trento	2,130	36.53	58.3
Dobbiaco	Bolzano	3,492	125.42	27.8
Drena	Trento	609	8.34	73.0
Dro	Trento	5,088	27.95	182.0
Egna	Bolzano	5,518	23.57	234.1
Fai della Paganella	Trento	941	12.13	77.6
Falzes	Bolzano	3,192	33.13	96.3
Fiavè	Trento	1,103	24.28	45.4
Fiè allo Sciliar	Bolzano	3,747	43.96	85.2
Fierozzo	Trento	454	17.94	25.3
Folgaria	Trento	3,169	71.63	44.2
Fornace	Trento	1,363	7.22	188.8
Fortezza	Bolzano	1,139	61.77	18.4
Frassilongo	Trento	336	16.68	20.1
Funes	Bolzano	2,550	81.38	31.3
Gais	Bolzano	3,283	60.62	54.2
Gargazzone	Bolzano	1,790	4.91	364.6
Garniga Terme	Trento	427	13.13	32.5
Giovo	Trento	2,518	20.81	121.0
Giustino	Trento	752	39.39	19.1
Glorenza	Bolzano	937	13.22	70.9
Grigno	Trento	2,030	46.39	43.8
Imer	Trento	1,152	27.73	41.5
Isera	Trento	2,816	14.09	199.9
La Valle	Bolzano	1,419	13.89	102.2
Laces	Bolzano	5,279	38.92	135.6
Lagundo	Bolzano	5,075	78.71	64.5
Laion	Bolzano	2,833	23.68	119.6
Laives	Bolzano	18,681	24.11	774.8
Lana	Bolzano	12,745	36.12	352.9
Lasa	Bolzano	4,182	36.12	115.8
Lauregno	Bolzano	316	110.23	2.9
Lavarone	Trento	1,205	26.32	45.8
Lavis	Trento	9,208	12.18	756.0
Ledro	Trento	5,478	156.39	35.0
Levico Terme	Trento	8,334	62.83	132.6
Livo	Trento	774	15.22	50.9
Lona-Lases	Trento	882	11.37	77.6
Luserna	Trento	263	8.20	32.1
Luson	Bolzano	1,579	74.41	21.2
Madruzzo	Trento	3,006	28.94	103.9
Magrè sulla Strada del Vino	Bolzano	1,312	13.86	94.7
Malè	Trento	2,296	26.53	86.5
Malles Venosta	Bolzano	5,246	247.43	21.2
Marebbe	Bolzano	3,221	160.32	20.1
Marlengo	Bolzano	2,910	12.86	226.3
Martello	Bolzano	840	142.80	5.9
Massimeno	Trento	134	21.03	6.4
Mazzin	Trento	616	23.63	26.1
Meltina	Bolzano	1,724	36.95	46.7
Merano	Bolzano	41,658	26.34	1,581.5
Mezzana	Trento	883	27.35	32.3
Mezzano	Trento	1,584	48.85	32.4
Mezzocorona	Trento	5,462	25.35	215.5
Mezzolombardo	Trento	7,799	13.88	561.9
Moena	Trento	2,551	82.60	30.9
Molveno	Trento	1,100	34.12	32.2
Monguelfo-Tesido	Bolzano	2,904	46.44	62.5
Montagna sulla Strada del Vino	Bolzano	1,766	19.51	90.5
Mori	Trento	10,328	40.08	257.7
Moso in Passiria	Bolzano	2,029	193.53	10.5
Nago-Torbole	Trento	2,732	28.39	96.2
Nalles	Bolzano	2,111	12.24	172.5
Naturno	Bolzano	6,101	67.11	90.9
Naz-Sciaves	Bolzano	3,522	15.96	220.7
Nogaredo	Trento	2,104	3.61	582.8
Nomi	Trento	1,360	6.49	209.6
Nova Levante	Bolzano	2,110	51.10	41.3
Nova Ponente	Bolzano	4,148	112.49	36.9
Novaledo	Trento	1,151	7.97	144.4
Novella	Trento	3,581	46.59	76.9
Ora	Bolzano	3,932	11.79	333.5
Ortisei	Bolzano	4,710	24.16	195.0
Ospedaletto	Trento	792	16.75	47.3
Ossana	Trento	826	25.25	32.7
Palù del Fersina	Trento	173	16.65	10.4
Panchià	Trento	819	20.21	40.5
Parcines	Bolzano	3,973	55.40	71.7
Peio	Trento	1,795	162.33	11.1
Pellizzano	Trento	740	48.36	15.3
Pelugo	Trento	388	22.98	16.9
Perca	Bolzano	1,768	30.36	58.2
Pergine Valsugana	Trento	21,635	54.33	398.2
Pieve di Bono-Prezzo	Trento	1,461	24.68	59.2
Pieve Tesino	Trento	666	69.23	9.6
Pinzolo	Trento	3,076	69.32	44.4
Plaus	Bolzano	760	4.87	156.1
Pomarolo	Trento	2,416	9.23	261.8
Ponte Gardena	Bolzano	271	2.33	116.3
Porte di Rendena	Trento	1,814	40.72	44.5
Postal	Bolzano	2,057	6.69	307.5
Prato allo Stelvio	Bolzano	3,866	51.00	75.8
Predaia	Trento	7,054	80.05	88.1
Predazzo	Trento	4,510	109.97	41.0
Predoi	Bolzano	508	86.36	5.9
Primiero San Martino di Castrozza	Trento	4,964	200.06	24.8
Proves	Bolzano	243	18.37	13.2
Rabbi	Trento	1,374	132.79	10.3
Racines	Bolzano	4,702	203.29	23.1
Rasun-Anterselva	Bolzano	2,936	121.57	24.2
Renon	Bolzano	8,332	111.36	74.8
Rifiano	Bolzano	1,393	35.94	38.8
Rio di Pusteria	Bolzano	3,330	83.82	39.7
Riva del Garda	Trento	17,758	40.73	436.0
Rodengo	Bolzano	1,304	29.62	44.0
Romeno	Trento	1,529	9.13	167.5
Roncegno Terme	Trento	3,020	38.08	79.3
Ronchi Valsugana	Trento	450	10.00	45.0
Ronzo-Chienis	Trento	1,004	13.21	76.0
Ronzone	Trento	515	5.30	97.2
Roverè della Luna	Trento	1,658	10.41	159.3
Rovereto	Trento	40,513	50.99	794.5
Ruffrè-Mendola	Trento	399	6.58	60.6
Rumo	Trento	783	30.85	25.4
Sagron Mis	Trento	171	11.06	15.5
Salorno	Bolzano	3,835	33.13	115.8
Samone	Trento	540	4.90	110.2
San Candido	Bolzano	3,318	79.85	41.6
San Genesio Atesino	Bolzano	3,026	68.84	44.0
San Giovanni di Fassa	Trento	3,633	99.82	36.4
San Leonardo in Passiria	Bolzano	3,680	89.03	41.3
San Lorenzo di Sebato	Bolzano	3,993	51.46	77.6
San Lorenzo Dorsino	Trento	1,565	73.92	21.2
San Martino in Badia	Bolzano	1,794	75.94	23.6
San Martino in Passiria	Bolzano	3,323	29.99	110.8
San Michele all'Adige	Trento	4,098	16.00	256.1
San Pancrazio	Bolzano	1,548	63.17	24.5
Sant'Orsola Terme	Trento	1,141	15.36	74.3
Santa Cristina Valgardena	Bolzano	2,036	31.92	63.8
Sanzeno	Trento	900	7.88	114.2
Sarentino	Bolzano	7,282	302.27	24.1
Sarnonico	Trento	783	12.19	64.2
Scena	Bolzano	3,069	48.13	63.8
Scurelle	Trento	1,381	30.00	46.0
Segonzano	Trento	1,408	20.71	68.0
Sella Giudicarie	Trento	2,985	85.76	34.8
Selva dei Molini	Bolzano	1,367	104.79	13.0
Selva di Val Gardena	Bolzano	2,630	56.24	46.8
Senale-San Felice	Bolzano	814	27.63	29.5
Senales	Bolzano	1,234	209.84	5.9
Sesto	Bolzano	1,799	80.42	22.4
Sfruz	Trento	383	11.81	32.4
Silandro	Bolzano	6,408	115.17	55.6
Sluderno	Bolzano	1,894	20.72	91.4
Soraga di Fassa	Trento	714	19.75	36.2
Sover	Trento	807	14.82	54.5
Spiazzo	Trento	1,275	71.07	17.9
Spormaggiore	Trento	1,293	30.20	42.8
Sporminore	Trento	722	17.47	41.3
Stelvio	Bolzano	1,179	141.63	8.3
Stenico	Trento	1,186	49.15	24.1
Storo	Trento	4,495	62.94	71.4
Strembo	Trento	571	38.33	14.9
Telve	Trento	1,938	64.75	29.9
Telve di Sopra	Trento	618	17.72	34.9
Tenna	Trento	1,063	3.11	341.8
Tenno	Trento	2,054	28.30	72.6
Terento	Bolzano	1,837	42.16	43.6
Terlano	Bolzano	5,017	18.57	270.2
Termeno sulla Strada del Vino	Bolzano	3,393	19.44	174.5
Terragnolo	Trento	703	39.57	17.8
Terre d'Adige	Trento	3,128	16.58	188.7
Terzolas	Trento	644	5.59	115.2
Tesero	Trento	2,996	50.55	59.3
Tesimo	Bolzano	2,083	38.13	54.6
Tione di Trento	Trento	3,772	33.45	112.8
Tires	Bolzano	1,036	42.18	24.6
Tirolo	Bolzano	2,493	25.62	97.3
Ton	Trento	1,306	26.28	49.7
Torcegno	Trento	704	15.19	46.3
Trambileno	Trento	1,519	50.70	30.0
Tre Ville	Trento	1,359	81.49	16.7
Trento	Trento	119,359	157.88	756.0
Trodena nel parco naturale	Bolzano	1,068	20.56	51.9
Tubre	Bolzano	961	46.27	20.8
Ultimo	Bolzano	2,921	208.12	14.0
Vadena	Bolzano	1,097	13.74	79.8
Val di Vizze	Bolzano	3,107	142.12	21.9
Valdaone	Trento	1,165	177.09	6.6
Valdaora	Bolzano	3,276	49.08	66.7
Valfloriana	Trento	477	39.33	12.1
Vallarsa	Trento	1,400	77.87	18.0
Valle Aurina	Bolzano	6,016	187.89	32.0
Valle di Casies	Bolzano	2,356	110.14	21.4
Vallelaghi	Trento	5,227	72.45	72.1
Vandoies	Bolzano	3,384	110.82	30.5
Varna	Bolzano	5,104	70.34	72.6
Velturno	Bolzano	3,101	24.58	126.2
Verano	Bolzano	1,013	22.01	46.0
Vermiglio	Trento	1,767	95.64	18.5
Vignola-Falesina	Trento	217	11.95	18.2
Villa Lagarina	Trento	3,865	24.13	160.2
Villabassa	Bolzano	1,607	18.03	89.1
Villandro	Bolzano	1,872	43.95	42.6
Ville d'Anaunia	Trento	4,659	89.13	52.3
Ville di Fiemme	Trento	2,633	46.15	57.1
Vipiteno	Bolzano	7,040	32.97	213.5
Volano	Trento	3,182	10.74	296.3
Ziano di Fiemme	Trento	1,752	35.75	49.0

== See also ==
- List of municipalities of Italy
