= Languages of Italy =

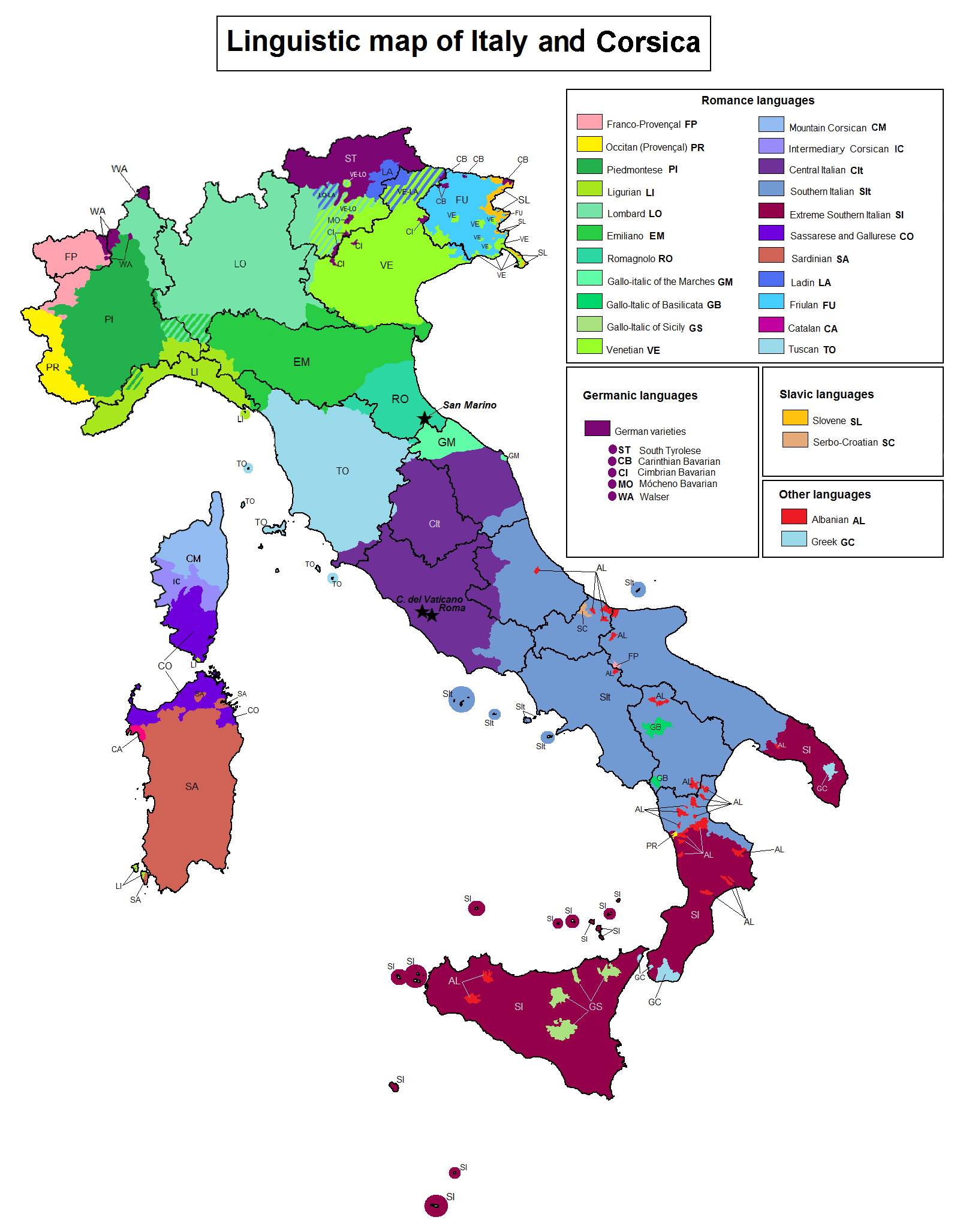
- Map of the regional and minority languages of Italy, including Corsica, Vatican City and San Marino.
- Official: Italian
- Regional: see "classification"
- Minority: see "historical linguistic minorities": Sardinian (2.5%: 1,424,000 people); Albanian (1.8%: 1,020,000 people); Friulian (1.2%: 684,000 people); Slovene/Croatian (0.4%: 203,000); Franco-Provençal (0.3%: 161,000 people); Catalan (0.3%: 149,000 people); Greek (0.2%: 140,000 people); Ladin (0.2%: 87,000 people); Occitan (0.1%: 31,000 people)
- Immigrant: Romanian; Albanian; Arabic; Chinese; Ukrainian; Filipino
- Foreign: English (58.6%: 32,879,000 people); French (33.7%: 18,897,000 people); Spanish (16.9%: 9,491,000 people); German (7.5%: 4,233,000 people); Russian (1.9%: 1,085,000 people); Arabic (1.2%: 645,000 people); Chinese (0.9%: 521,000 people); Other regional language (6%)
- Signed: Italian Sign Language
- Keyboard layout: Italian QWERTY
- Source: Special Eurobarometer, Europeans and their Languages, 2006

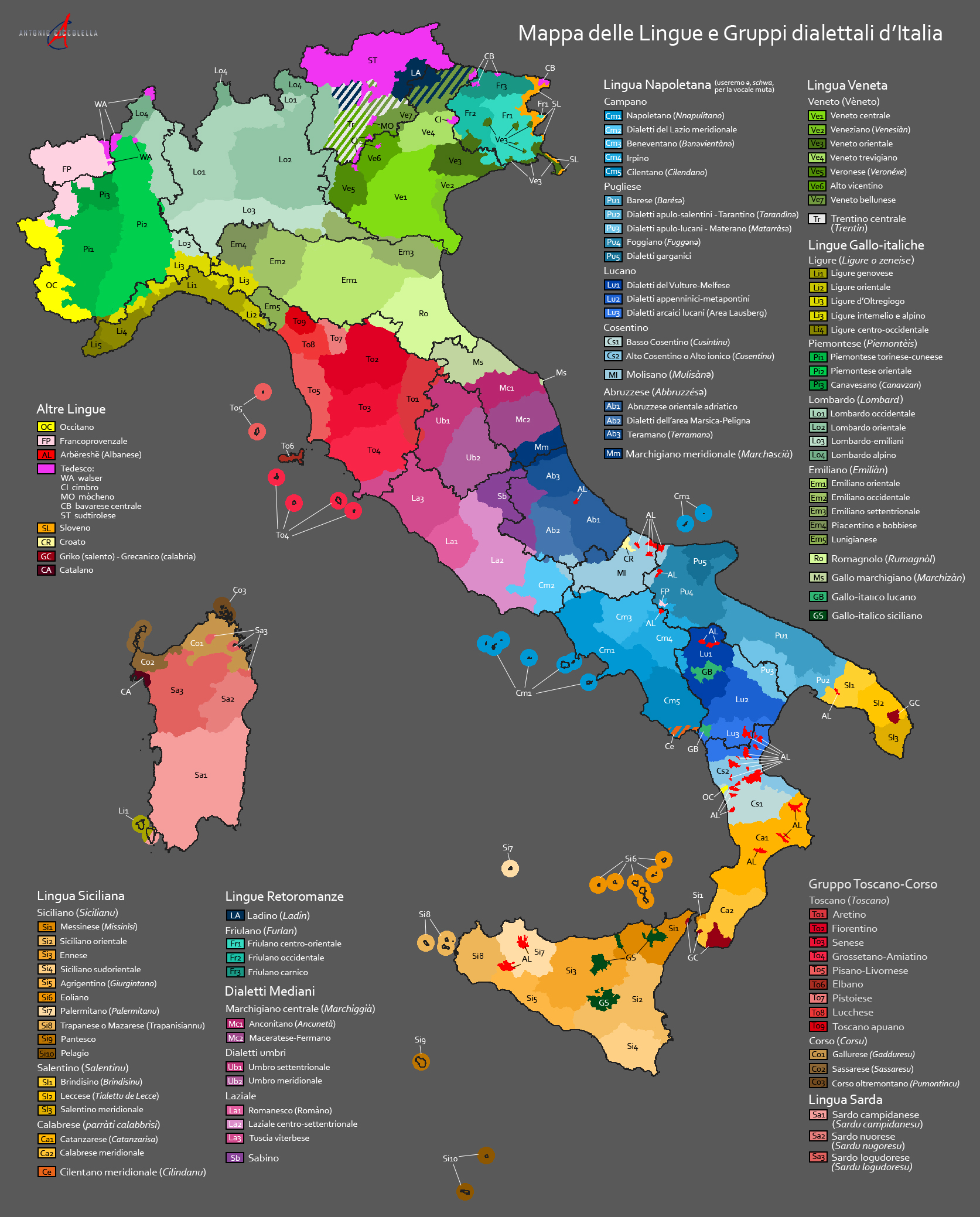

Italy is one of the most linguistically diverse areas in Europe. About 45.9% of the Italian population speak primarily Italian at home, while another 32.2% speak a local language alongside Italian. Italian is the country's national and official language, and has a standard form and regional varieties. It is the most spoken language in Italy. In addition to Italian, numerous local and regional languages are spoken; most of these, like Italian, belong to the Romance language group. In Italy, these are commonly called dialetti ("dialects"). Most of the Romance varieties of Italy often labelled as "regional" form part of a continuum, with varying degrees of transition between neighbouring varieties across different areas, regardless of administrative boundaries; speakers can typically recognize the features that distinguish their own variety from others spoken nearby.

According to Italian linguist Tullio De Mauro, at the time of the unification of Italy in 1861, 2.5% of the population spoke Italian. The language later spread widely among the general population through compulsory education, urbanization, internal migration, bureaucracy, military service, and mass media (both print and audiovisual media) from the 1950s onwards. Italian was originally based on the Tuscan spoken in Florence during the 13th and 14th centuries. Most of the local languages (dialetti) evolved from colloquial Latin independently of Tuscan, and are therefore not derived from Italian, but "sister languages" of Italian and other Romance varieties. Some local languages do not derive from Latin, but belong to other Indo-European branches. For example, Cimbrian is Germanic, Arbëresh varieties are Albanian, Slavomolisano is Slavic, and Griko is Hellenic. Other languages are spoken by more recent immigrant communities.

The second most spoken language in Italy is a dialect continuum known outside of Italy as Neapolitan language, spoken by about 11 million people in most of Southern Italy, excluding Sicily and Sardinia. The Neapolitan language was classified with this name by UNESCO as an endangered language, and it is also the term used by Ethnologue, while Glottolog uses "Continental Southern Italian". In Italy, the term Intermediate Southern Italian (meridionale intermedio) is preferred, as the word napoletano only refers to the varieties spoken in the city of Naples and its immediate surroundings.

Twelve languages are officially recognized as spoken by linguistic minorities: Albanian, Catalan, German, Greek, Slovene, Croatian, French, Franco-Provençal, Friulian, Ladin, Occitan and Sardinian. Sardinian is considered one of the largest of these, with approximately one million speakers, even though the number of speakers is overall declining.

== Ancient languages of Italy ==
Ethnolinguistic map of Italy in the Iron Age, before the Roman expansion and conquest of Italy

Numerous languages were spoken in ancient Italy. These included Etruscan and the Italic branch of the Indo-European languages, consisting of Latino-Faliscan and Osco-Umbrian languages. Furthermore, Celtic languages were spoken in Cisalpine Gaul and ancient Greek was spoken in Magna Graecia. Latin emerged out of the Latino-Faliscan group and replaced the other languages spoken in Italy following the Romanization of the whole peninsula; it is the ancestor of all the Romance languages, the only living subgroup of the Italic languages.

== Language or dialect ==
Almost all of the Romance languages spoken in Italy are native to the area in which they are spoken. Apart from Standard Italian, these languages are often referred to as dialetti "dialects", both colloquially and in scholarly usage; however, the term may coexist with other labels like "minority languages" or "vernaculars" for some of them. The label "dialect" may be understood erroneously to imply that the native languages spoken in Italy are "dialects" of Standard Italian in the prevailing English-language sense of "varieties or variations of a language". This is not the case in Italy, as the country's long-standing linguistic diversity does not actually stem from Standard Italian. Most of Italy's variety of Romance languages predate Italian and evolved locally from Vulgar Latin, independently of what would become the standard national language, long before the fairly recent spread of Standard Italian throughout Italy. In fact, Standard Italian itself can be thought of as either a continuation of, or a language heavily based on, the Florentine dialect of Tuscan. Thus, the Romance languages of Italy that are commonly referred to as "dialects" are described as such in a sociolinguistic sense: they are languages that are socially subordinate to Standard Italian, which is the politically and culturally dominant language.

The indigenous Romance languages of Italy are therefore classified as separate languages that evolved from Latin just like Standard Italian, rather than "dialects" or variations of the latter. Conversely, with the spread of Standard Italian throughout Italy in the 20th century, local varieties of Standard Italian have also developed throughout the peninsula, influenced to varying extents by the underlying local languages, most noticeably at the phonological level; though regional boundaries seldom correspond to isoglosses distinguishing these varieties, these variations of Standard Italian are commonly referred to as regional Italian (italiano regionale).

Twelve languages have been legally granted official recognition as of 1999, but their selection to the exclusion of others is a matter of some controversy. Daniele Bonamore argues that many regional languages were not recognized in light of their communities' historical participation in the construction of the Standard Italian language: Giacomo da Lentini's and Cielo d'Alcamo's Sicilian, Guido Guinizelli's Bolognese, Jacopone da Todi's Umbrian, Neapolitan, Carlo Goldoni's Venetian and Dante's Tuscan are considered to be historical founders of the Standard Italian linguistic majority; outside of such epicenters are, on the other hand, Friulian, Ladin, Sardinian, Franco-Provençal and Occitan, which are recognized as distinct languages. Michele Salazar found Bonamore's explanation "new and convincing".

== Legal status of Italian ==
Italian was first declared Italy’s official language during the Fascist period, more specifically through a Royal Decree-Law (R.D.L.) that applied to the entire Italian empire. It was adopted on 15 October 1925, under the title: "Sull'Obbligo della lingua italiana in tutti gli uffici giudiziari del Regno, salvo le eccezioni stabilite nei trattati internazionali per la città di Fiume."

The first Italian Constitution of 1948 establishes Italian as the official national language. Article 1 of Law 482/1999 states: "La lingua ufficiale della Repubblica è l’italiano" ("The official language of the Republic is Italian") Since the constitution was penned, some laws and articles have been written on the procedures of criminal cases passed that explicitly state that Italian should be used:

- Statute of the Trentino-South Tyrol (constitutional law of the northern region of Italy around Trento): "... [la lingua] italiana ... è la lingua ufficiale dello Stato." (Statuto Speciale per il Trentino-Alto Adige/Südtirol, Art. 99, "... [the language] Italian ... is the official language of the State.")
- Code for civil procedure: "In tutto il processo è prescritto l'uso della lingua italiana." (Codice di procedura civile, Art. 122, "In all procedures, the use of the Italian language is required.")
  - Exception: In the Autonomous Province of Bolzano/Bozen, German are entitled in equal status in legal proceedings under Art. 99–100 of the Special Statute for Trentino-Alto Adige and Presidential Decree D.P.R. 574/1988, that allows parties to use German or request bilingual proceedings.
- Code for criminal procedure: "Gli atti del procedimento penale sono compiuti in lingua italiana." (Codice di procedura penale, Art. 109 [169-3; 63, 201 att.], "The acts of the criminal proceedings are carried out in the Italian language.")
  - Exception: Citizens in the Province of Bolzano have the right to use their mother tongue (German or Italian) during criminal proceedings, with trial acts generated bilingually or in the language of the defendant (D.P.R. 574/1988).

== Historical linguistic minorities ==
=== Recognition by the Italian state ===
Communities recognized by Italy as historical linguistic minorities

The Republic safeguards linguistic minorities by means of appropriate measures.

— Italian Constitution, Art. 6

Art. 6 of the Italian Constitution was drafted by the Founding Fathers to show sympathy for the country's historical linguistic minorities, in a way for the newly founded Republic to let them become part of the national fabric and distance itself from the Italianization policies promoted earlier because of nationalism.

Throughout the 19th and 20th centuries, the use of standard Italian became increasingly widespread and was mirrored by a decline in the use of the dialects. An increase in literacy was one of the main driving factors (one can assume that only literates were capable of learning standard Italian, whereas those who were illiterate had access only to their native dialect). The percentage of literates rose from 25% in 1861 to 60% in 1911, and then on to 78.1% in 1951. Tullio De Mauro, an Italian linguist, has asserted that in 1861, only 2.5% of the population of Italy could speak standard Italian. He reports that in 1951, that percentage had risen to 87%. The ability to speak Italian did not necessarily mean that it was in everyday use, and most people (63.5%) still usually spoke their native dialects.

During Fascism, which even carried out a persecution of alloglots minorities, since especially from the 1930s onward, the regime began to view local varieties as a threat to the country’s cultural and linguistic unity and as a potential encouragement of autonomist claims. Yet, initially, the Fascist education reform enacted in 1923 by Giovanni Gentile, whose curricula were drafted by Giuseppe Lombardo Radice, set aside the prevailing anti-dialectal attitude in schools, aiming instead to combat illiteracy starting from the student’s linguistic background before moving on to the national language (according to the “from dialect to language” method). It was instead with the 1934 school programs (“Ercole programs”) that “dialects” once again came to be regarded solely as sources of errors to be sanctioned, as had been the case in the 1905 programs and as would be in those of 1955.

For the Constitutional Court of the Italian Republic, Article 6 of the Constitution represents "the overcoming of the closed notion of the 19th-century national State and a reversal of great political and cultural significance, compared to the nationalistic attitude manifested by Fascism" as well as being "one of the fundamental principles of the current constitutional system".

However, more than a half century passed before the Art. 6 was followed by any of the above-mentioned "appropriate measures". Italy applied in fact the Article for the first time in 1999, by means of the national law N.482/99. According to the linguist Tullio De Mauro, the Italian delay of over 50 years in implementing Article 6 was caused by "decades of hostility to multilingualism" and "opaque ignorance".

Before said legal framework entered into force, only four linguistic minorities (the French-speaking community in the Aosta Valley; the German-speaking community and, to a limited extent, the Ladin one in the Province of Bolzano; the Slovene-speaking community in the Province of Trieste and, with less rights, the Province of Gorizia) enjoyed some kind of acknowledgment and protection, stemming from specific clauses within international treaties. The other eight linguistic minorities were to be recognized only in 1999, including the Slovene-speaking minority in the Province of Udine and the Germanic populations (Walser, Mocheni and Cimbri) residing in provinces different from Bolzano. Some now-recognized minority groups, namely in Friuli-Venezia Giulia and Sardinia, already provided themselves with regional laws of their own. It has been estimated that less than 400.000 people, out of the two million people belonging to the twelve historical minorities (with Sardinian being the numerically biggest one), enjoyed state-wide protection.

Around the 1960s, the Italian Parliament eventually resolved to apply the previously neglected article of the country's fundamental Charter. The Parliament thus appointed a "Committee of three Sages" to single out the groups that were to be recognized as linguistic minorities, and further elaborate the reason for their inclusion. The nominated people were Tullio de Mauro, Giovan Battista Pellegrini and Alessandro Pizzorusso, three notable figures who distinguished themselves with their life-long activity of research in the field of both linguistics and legal theory. Based on linguistic, historical as well as anthropological considerations, the experts eventually selected thirteen groups, corresponding to the currently recognized twelve with the further addition of the Sinti and Romani-speaking populations. The original list was approved, with the only exception of the nomadic peoples, who lacked the territoriality requisite and therefore needed a separate law. However, the draft was presented to the law-making bodies when the legislature was about to run its course, and had to be passed another time. The bill was met with resistance by all the subsequent legislatures, being reluctant to challenge the widely held myth of "Italian linguistic homogeneity", and only in 1999 did it eventually pass, becoming a law. In the end, the historical linguistic minorities have been recognized by the Law no. 482/1999 (Legge 15 Dicembre 1999, n. 482, Art. 2, comma 1).

Some interpretations of said law seem to divide the twelve minority languages into two groups, with the first including the non-Latin speaking populations (with the exception of the Catalan-speaking one) and the second including only the Romance-speaking populations. Some other interpretations state that a further distinction is implied, considering only some groups to be "national minorities". Regardless of the ambiguous phrasing, all the twelve groups are technically supposed to be allowed the same measures of protection; furthermore, the Framework Convention for the Protection of National Minorities, signed and ratified by Italy in 1997, applies to all the twelve groups mentioned by the 1999 national law, therefore including the Friulians, the Sardinians, the Occitans, the Ladins etc., with the addition of the Romani.

In actual practice, not each of the twelve historical linguistic minorities is given the same consideration. All of them still bear strong social pressure to assimilate to Italian, and some of them do not even have a widely acknowledged standard to be used for official purposes. In fact, the discrimination lay in the urgent need to award the highest degree of protection only to the French-speaking minority in the Aosta Valley and the German one in South Tyrol, owing to international treaties. For example, the institutional websites are only in Italian with a few exceptions, like a French version of the Italian Chamber of Deputies. A bill proposed by former prime minister Mario Monti's cabinet formally introduced a differential treatment between the twelve historical linguistic minorities, distinguishing between those with a "foreign mother tongue" (the groups protected by agreements with Austria, France and Slovenia) and those with a "peculiar dialect" (all the others). The bill was later implemented, but deemed unconstitutional by the Constitutional Court.

=== Recognition at the European level ===
Italy is a signatory of the European Charter for Regional or Minority Languages, but has not ratified the treaty, and therefore its provisions protecting regional languages do not apply in the country. However, the Charter does not establish at what point differences in expression result in a separate language, deeming it an "often controversial issue", and citing the necessity to take into account, other than purely linguistic criteria, also "psychological, sociological and political considerations".

== Regional recognition of the local languages ==
- Aosta Valley:
  - French is officially recognised and safeguarded in the whole region, enjoying the same dignity and standing of Italian (Le Statut spécial de la Vallée d'Aoste, Titre VI^{e}, Article 38);
  - Franco-Provençal is unofficial but protected and promoted according to state and regional laws.
  - German is unofficial but recognised in the Lys Valley (Lystal) (Le Statut spécial de la Vallée d'Aoste, Titre VI^{e}, Art. 40 - bis).
- Apulia:
  - Griko, Arbëresh and Franco-Provençal are recognized and safeguarded (Legge regionale 5/2012).

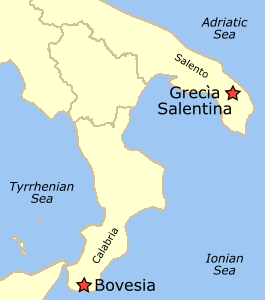
Map showing the areas where the Griko language is still spoken (Bovesia and Grecìa Salentina); the last living trace of the Greek elements that once formed Magna Graecia.

- Basilicata:
  - Arbëresh is officially recognized.
- Calabria:
  - Calabrian Greek, Arbëresh and Occitan are officially recognised and safeguarded.
- Campania: Neapolitan is "promoted" but not recognised by the region (Reg. Gen. nn. 159/I 198/I, Art. 1, comma 4).
- Friuli-Venezia Giulia:
  - Friulian, Slovene and German are "promoted", but not recognised, by the region (Legge regionale 18 dicembre 2007, n. 29, Art. 1, comma 1); (Legge regionale 16 novembre 2007, n. 26, Art. 16); (Legge regionale 20 novembre 2009, n. 20);

Comparison between the domains of the Duchy of Milan in the 14th century (in green) and the modern geographical borders of the Lombard language (in yellow)

- Lombardy:
  - Lombard is unofficial but recognised as the regional language (Legge regionale 25/2016).
- Piedmont:
  - Piedmontese is unofficial but recognised as the regional language (Consiglio Regionale del Piemonte, Ordine del Giorno n. 1118, Presentato il 30 November 1999);
  - the region "promotes", without recognising, the Occitan, Franco-Provençal, French and Walser languages (Legge regionale 7 aprile 2009, n. 11, Art. 1).
- Sardinia:
  - The region considers the cultural identity of the Sardinian people as a primary asset (l.r. N.26/97, l.r. N.22/18), in accordance with the values of equality and linguistic pluralism enshrined in the Italian Constitution and the European treaties, with particular reference to the European Charter for Regional or Minority Languages and the Framework Convention for the Protection of National Minorities (l.r. N.26/97). All the languages indigenous to the island (Sardinian, Catalan, Tabarchino, Sassarese and Gallurese) are recognised and promoted as "enjoying the same dignity and standing of Italian" (l.r. N.26/97) in their respective linguistic areas.
- Sicily:
  - Gallo-Italic of Sicily and Arbëresh are officially recognized and safeguarded.
  - Sicilian is unofficial but recognised as the regional language (Legge regionale 9/2011).
- South Tyrol:
  - German and Ladin are official (enjoying the same dignity and standing of Italian, the national language) in the province of South Tyrol (Statuto speciale per il Trentino-Alto Adige, Titolo XI, Articolo 99 and Articolo 102); German being the most spoken by the population.
- Trentino:
  - Ladin, Cimbrian, and Mòcheno are unofficial but recognised in (Statuto speciale per il Trentino-Alto Adige, Titolo XI, Articolo 102).
- Trentino-Alto Adige/Südtirol
  - German (in South Tyrolean dialect form) is officially recognized and safeguarded. In some municipalities Ladin, Mocheno, and Cimbrian are also recognized.
- Veneto:
  - Venetan is unofficial but recognised and promoted (Legge regionale 13 aprile 2007, n. 8, Art. 2, comma 2).

== Conservation status ==
Frequency of use of regional languages in Italy, as the sole or principal languages at home, based on ISTAT data from 2015

According to the UNESCO's Atlas of the World's Languages in Danger, there are 31 endangered languages in Italy. The degree of endangerment is classified in different categories ranging from 'safe' (safe languages are not included in the atlas) to 'extinct' (when there are no speakers left). The source for the languages' distribution is the Atlas of the World's Languages in Danger, unless otherwise stated, and refers to Italy exclusively.

=== Vulnerable ===
- Alemannic: spoken in the Lys Valley of the Aosta Valley and in Northern Piedmont
- Bavarian: South Tyrol
- Ladin: several valleys, comunes and villages in the Dolomites, including the Val Badia and the Gardena Valley in South Tyrol, the Fascia Valley in Trentino, and Livinallongo in the Province of Belluno
- Sicilian: Sicily, southern and central Calabria and southern Apulia
- Neapolitan: Campania, Basilicata, Abruzzo, Molise, northern Calabria, northern and central Apulia, southern Lazio and Marche as well as eastern fringes of Umbria
- Romanesco: Metropolitan City of Rome in Lazio and in some communes of southern Tuscany
- Venetian (Venetan): Veneto, parts of Friuli-Venezia Giulia

=== Definitely endangered ===
- Algherese Catalan: the town of Alghero in northwestern Sardinia; an outlying dialect of Catalan language not listed separately by the SIL International.
- Occitan Alpine Provençal: the upper valleys of Piedmont (Val Mairo, Val Varacho, Val d'Esturo, Entraigas, Limoun, Vinai, Pinerolo, Sestriere)
- Arbëresh: (i) Adriatic zone: Montecilfone, Campomarino, Portocannone and Ururi in Molise as well as Chieuti and Casalvecchio di Puglia in Apulia; (ii) San Marzano in Apulia; (iii) Greci in Campania; (iv) northern Basilicata: Barile, Ginestra and Maschito; (v) North Calabrian zone: ca. 30 settlements in northern Calabria (Plataci, Civita, Frascineto, San Demetrio Corone, Lungro, Acquaformosa etc.) as well as San Costantino Albanese and San Paolo Lucano in southern Basilicata; (vi) settlements in southern Calabria, e.g. San Nicola dell'Alto and Vena di Maida; (vii) Sicilian zone: Piana degli Albanesi and two nearby villages near Palermo; (viii) formerly also Villa Badessa in Abruzzo; an outlying dialect of Albanian
- Cimbrian: vigorously spoken in Luserna in Trentino; disappearing in Giazza (part of the commune Selva di Progno) in the Province of Verona and in Roana in the Province of Vicenza; recently extinct in several other locations in the region; an outlying Bavarian dialect
- Corsican: spoken on Maddalena Island off the northeast coast of Sardinia
- Emilian: North to Northwestern Emilia-Romagna, parts of the provinces of Pavia, Voghera, and Mantua in southern Lombardy, the Lunigiana district in northwestern Tuscany and in a zone called Traspadana Ferrarese in the Province of Rovigo in Veneto
- Romagnol: Southeastern Emilia-Romagna, the Alta Valle del Tevere district in northern part of the Province of Perugia and eastern part of the Province of Arezzo, the Province of Pesaro-Urbino in the Marche (disputed)
- Faetar: Faeto and Celle San Vito in the Province of Foggia in Apulia; a variety of Franco-Provençal not listed separately by the SIL
- Franco-Provençal: spoken in the Aosta Valley (Valdôtain dialect) and the Alpine valleys to the north and east of the Susa Valley in Piedmont
- Friulan: Friuli-Venezia Giulia except the Province of Trieste and western and eastern border regions, and Portogruaro area in the Province of Venice in Veneto

Distribution of Gallo-Italic of Sicily

- Gallo-Italic of Sicily: Nicosia, Sperlinga, Piazza Armerina, Valguarnera Caropepe and Aidone in the province of Enna, and San Fratello, Acquedolci, San Piero Patti, Montalbano Elicona, Novara di Sicilia and Fondachelli-Fantina in the province of Messina; an outlying dialect of Lombard not listed separately by the SIL; other dialects were formerly also spoken in southern Italy outside Sicily, especially in Basilicata
- Gallurese: northeastern Sardinia; an outlying dialect of Corsican
- Ligurian: Liguria and adjacent areas of Piedmont, Emilia and Tuscany; settlements in the towns of Carloforte on the San Pietro Island and Calasetta on the Sant'Antioco Island off the southwest coast of Sardinia
- Lombard: Lombardy (except the southernmost border areas) and the Province of Novara in Piedmont
- Mòcheno: Palù, Fierozzo and Frassilongo in the Fersina Valley in Trentino; an outlying Bavarian dialect
- Piedmontese: Piedmont except the Province of Novara, the western Alpine valleys and southern border areas, as well as minor adjacent areas
- Resian: Resia in the northeastern part of the Province of Udine; an outlying dialect of Slovene not listed separately by the SIL
- Romani: spoken by the Roma community in Italy
- Sardinian, consisting of both the Campidanese (southern Sardinia) and Logudorese (central Sardinia) dialects
- Sassarese: northwestern Sardinia; a transitional language between Corsican and Sardinian
- Yiddish: spoken by parts of the Jewish community in Italy

=== Severely endangered ===
- Walser German: the village of Issime in the upper Lys Valley/Lystal in the Aosta Valley; an outlying dialect of Alemannic not listed separately by the SIL. It is considered by Glottolog to be a separate language.
- Molise Croatian: the villages of Montemitro, San Felice del Molise, and Acquaviva Collecroce in the Province of Campobasso in southern Molise; a mixed Chakavian–Shtokavian dialect of Croatian not listed separately by the SIL. It is considered by Glottolog to be a separate language.
- Griko: the Salento peninsula in the Province of Lecce in southern Apulia; an outlying dialect of Greek not listed separately by the SIL. It is considered by Glottolog to be a separate language known as Apulia-Calabrian Greek.
- Gardiol Occitan: Guardia Piemontese in Calabria; an outlying dialect of Occitan Alpine Provençal. It is considered by Glottolog to be a separate language.
- Griko (Calabria): a few villages near Reggio di Calabria in southern Calabria; an outlying dialect of Greek not listed separately by the SIL. It is considered by Glottolog to be a separate language known as Apulia-Calabrian Greek.

== Classification ==
All living languages indigenous to Italy are part of the Indo-European language family. They can be divided into Romance languages and non-Romance languages. The classification of the Romance languages of Italy is controversial, and listed here are two of the generally accepted classification systems.

=== Romance languages ===
The following classification of Romance languages of Italy is based on that of Giovan Battista Pellegrini (1980), revised and updated by Touring Club Italiano in collaboration with National Research Council (1989–1992) and then by Michele Loporcaro (2009). It groups different Romance languages according to areal and identifies the following linguistic areas:

- Gallo-Italic:
  - Emilian (spoken in Emilia);
  - Romagnol (spoken in Romagna);
  - Lombard (spoken in Lombardy);
  - Western Trentino (spoken in Western Trentino)
  - Central Trentino (spoken in Central Trentino)
  - Piedmontese (spoken in Piedmont);
  - Ligurian (spoken in Liguria);
  - Northern Marchigian (spoken in Northern Marches);
  - Lunigiano (spoken in extreme Northwest of the Province of Massa-Carrara).
- Venetan:
  - Central and Northern Venetan;
  - Southern Venetan;
  - Ladin-Venetan (spoken in the surroundings of Agordo);
  - Venetian (spoken in the Venetian Lagoon);
  - Veronese (spoken in Verona district);
  - Liventino (spoken in Lower Livenza Valley);
  - Triestine (spoken in Trieste district);
  - Eastern Trentino (spoken in Eastern Trentino).
- Friulian:
  - Western Friulian (spoken in east of Pordenone);
  - Central-Eastern Friulian (spoken in Southeastern Friuli);
  - Carnico (spoken in Northern Friuli).
- Ladin:
  - Atesino Ladin (spoken in Fassa Valley, Badia Valley and Gardena Valley);
  - Cadorino Ladin (spoken in Cadore);
  - Fiammazzo Ladin (spoken in Fiemme Valley).
- Franco-Provençal:
  - Valdôtain Franco-Provençal (spoken in Aosta Valley);
  - Piedmontese Franco-Provençal (spoken in the Arpitan Valleys of Piedmont).
- Provençal:
  - Piedmontese Provençal (spoken in the Alpine valleys of Southwestern Piedmont)
- Tuscan:
  - Western Toscano (spoken in Pisa and Leghorn districts)
  - Florentine (spoken in Florence district);
  - Senese (spoken in Siena district);
  - Aretino (spoken in Arezzo district);
  - Grossetano- Amiatino (spoken in Grosseto district and Monte Amiata area);
  - Apuano (spoken in Apuan Alps);
  - Elbano (spoken in Elba island).
- Central:
  - Central Marchigian (spoken in Central Marches);
  - Northern Umbrian (spoken in Northern Umbria);
  - Western Umbrian (spoken in Western Umbria);
  - Southern Umbrian-Viterbese (spoken in Southern Umbria);
  - Northern Latian (spoken in Northern Lazio);
  - Southern Latian (spoken in Southern Lazio);
  - Romanesco (spoken in Rome);
  - Reatino-Aquilano (spoken in Rieti and extreme North-western Abruzzo).
- Upper Southern:
  - Southern Marchigian (spoken in Southern Marches);
  - Abruzzese (spoken in Northern, Eastern and Southern Abruzzo);
  - Molisan (spoken in Molise);
  - Southern Latian (spoken in Southern Lazio);
  - Apulo-Barese (spoken in Central Apulia)
  - Dauno-Appenninico (spoken in Northern Apulia with the exception of the Northern Gargano)
  - Garganico (spoken in Southern Gargano)
  - Tarantino (spoken in Taranto district)
  - Campanian (spoken in Campania)
  - Irpinian (spoked in Avellino district);
  - Neapolitan (spoken in Naples district);
  - Cilentan (spoken in Cilento)
  - Lucano (spoken in Basilicata);
  - Northern Calabrian (spoken in Northern Calabria).
- Extreme Southern:
  - Salentino (spoken in Salento);
  - Central and Southern Calabrian (spoken in Central and Southern Calabria);
  - Sicilian (spoken in Sicily).
- Sardinian (spoken in and Southern and Central Sardinia):
  - Campidanese Sardinian (spoken in Southern Sardinia)
  - Northern Logudorese (spoken in Northern Logudoro)
  - Nuorese (spoken in Nuoro district)
  - Barbaricino (spoken in Barbagia)
- Sassarese (spoken in northwestern Sardinia).
- Gallurese (spoken in northeastern Sardinia).

The following classification is proposed by Maiden and Parry:

- Northern varieties:
  - Northern Italo-Romance:
    - 'Gallo-Italian' (Piedmont, Lombardy, Liguria and Emilia-Romagna).
    - Venetan.
  - Ladin.
  - Friulian.
- Central and Southern:
  - Tuscan (with Corsican).
  - Middle Italian (Marche, Umbria, Lazio).
  - Upper Southern (Abruzzo, northern Puglia, Molise, Campania, Basilicata).
  - Extreme Southern (Salento, southern Calabria and Sicily).
- Sardinian.

=== Non-Romance languages ===
==== Albanian, Slavic, Greek and Romani languages ====
Language	Family				ISO 639-3	Dialects spoken in Italy	Notes	Speakers
Arbëresh	Albanian	Tosk			aae	According to Minority Rights Group International: "The ethnic Albanian (Arbëresh) dialects of Italy bear little resemblance to the standard language or dialects of Albania, as they have been cut off from the main language for around 500 years. Some dialects spoken in Italy are so dissimilar that ethnic Albanians use Italian as a lingua franca. Ethnic Albanians are bilingual."	recognized as a variant of the Albanian strain by UNESCO	100,000
Croatian	Slavic	South	Western		hr	Molise Croatian		1,000
Slovene (slovenščina)	Slavic	South	Western		slv	Gai Valley dialect; Resian; Torre Valley dialect; Natisone Valley dialect; Brda dialect; Karst dialect; Inner Carniolan dialect; Istrian dialect		100,000
Italiot Greek	Hellenic (Greek)	Attic			ell	Griko (Salento); Calabrian Greek		20,000
Romani	Indo-Iranian	Indo-Aryan	Central Zone	Romani	rom	By ISO 639-3 classification, Sinte Romani is the individual language most present in Italy in the Romany macrolanguage

==== High German languages ====
Language	Family		ISO 639-3	Dialects spoken in Italy	Notes	Speakers
German	Middle German	East Middle German	deu	Tyrolean dialects	Austrian German is the usual standard variety	315,000
Cimbrian	Upper German	Bavarian-Austrian	cim		sometimes considered a dialect of Bavarian, also considered an outlying dialect of Bavarian by the UNESCO	2,200
Mocheno	Upper German	Bavarian-Austrian	mhn		considered an outlying dialect of Bavarian by the UNESCO	1,000
Walser	Upper German	Alemannic	wae			3,400

== Geographic distribution ==
=== Northern Italy ===
The Northern Italian languages are conventionally defined as those Romance languages spoken north of the La Spezia–Rimini Line, which runs through the northern Apennine Mountains just to the north of Tuscany; however, the dialects of Occitan and Franco-Provençal spoken in the extreme northwest of Italy (e.g. the Valdôtain in the Aosta Valley) are generally excluded. The classification of these languages is difficult and not agreed-upon, due both to the variations among the languages and to the fact that they share isoglosses of various sorts with both the Italo-Romance languages to the south and the Gallo-Romance languages to the northwest.

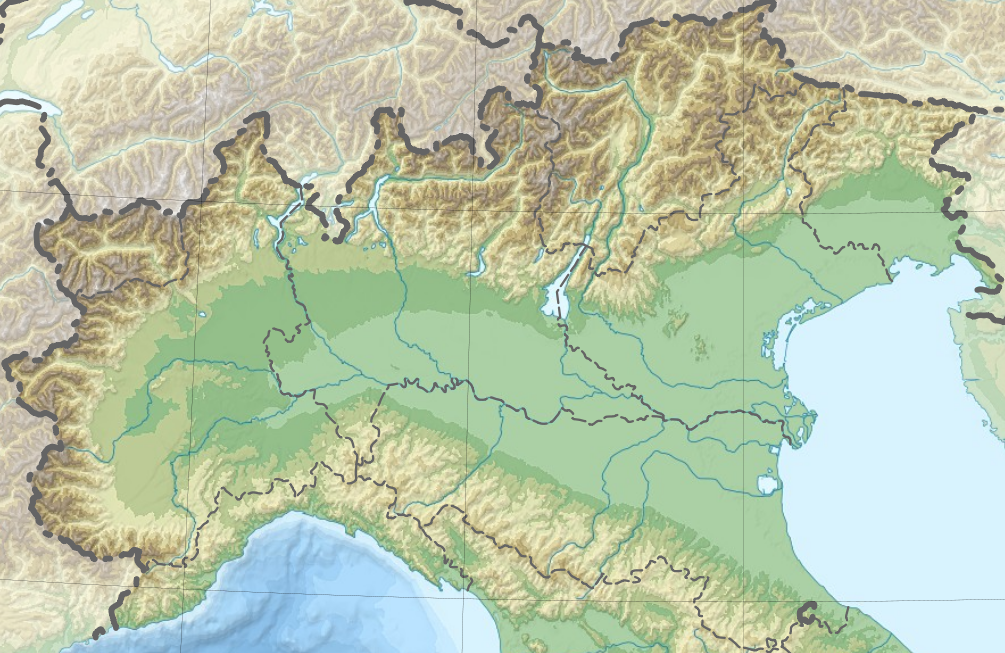

One common classification divides these languages into four groups:

- The Italian Rhaeto-Romance languages, including Ladin and Friulian.
- The poorly researched Istriot language.
- The Venetian language (sometimes grouped with the majority Gallo-Italian languages).
- The Gallo-Italian languages, including all the rest (although with some doubt regarding the position of Ligurian).

Any such classification runs into the basic problem that there is a dialect continuum throughout northern Italy, with a continuous transition of spoken dialects between e.g. Venetian and Ladin, or Venetian and Emilio-Romagnolo (usually considered Gallo-Italian). All of these languages are considered innovative relative to the Romance languages as a whole, with some of the Gallo-Italian languages having phonological changes nearly as extreme as standard French (usually considered the most phonologically innovative of the Romance languages). This distinguishes them significantly from standard Italian, which is extremely conservative in its phonology (and notably conservative in its morphology).

=== Southern Italy and islands ===
Approximate distribution of the regional languages of Sardinia and Southern Italy according to the UNESCO's Atlas of the World's Languages in Danger:

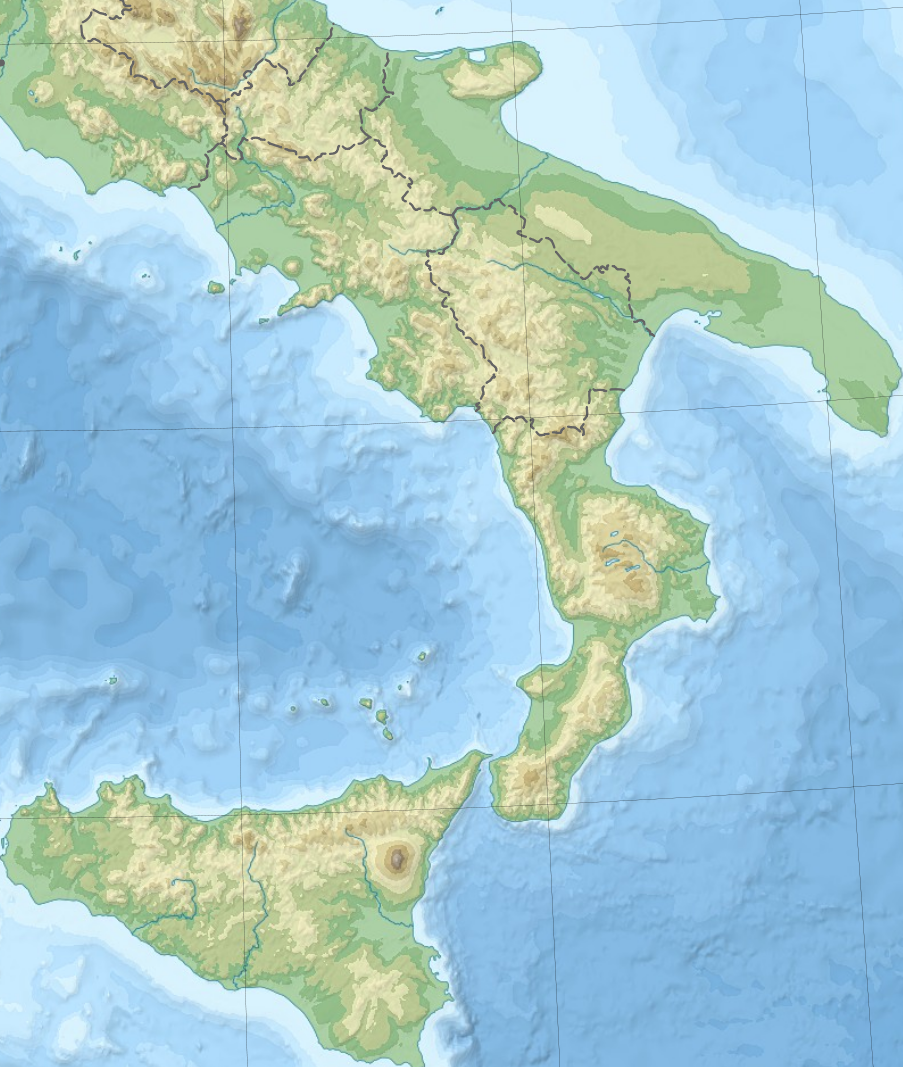

One common classification divides these languages into two groups:

- The Italo-Dalmatian languages, including Neapolitan and Sicilian, as well as the Sardinian-influenced Sassarese and Gallurese which are sometimes grouped with Sardinian but are actually of southern Corsican origin.
- The Sardinian language, usually listed as a group of its own with two main Logudorese and Campidanese orthographic forms.

All of these languages are considered conservative relative to the Romance languages as a whole, with Sardinian being the most conservative of them all.

== Mother tongues of foreign citizens in Italy ==
Language (2024)	Population
Romanian	1,073,196
Arabic	577,897
Albanian	416,229
Chinese	308,984
Ukrainian	273,484
Bengali	192,678
Hindi	170,880
Filipino	156,642
Others	210,767

== Standardised written forms ==
Although "[al]most all Italian dialects were being written in the Middle Ages, for administrative, religious, and often artistic purposes", use of local language gave way to stylized Tuscan, eventually labeled Italian. Local languages are still occasionally written, but only the following regional languages of Italy have a standardised written form. This may be widely accepted or used alongside more traditional written forms:

- Piedmontese: traditional, definitely codified between the 1920s and the 1960s by Pinin Pacòt and Camillo Brero
- Ligurian: "Grafîa ofiçiâ" created by the Académia Ligùstica do Brénno;
- Sardinian: "Limba Sarda Comuna" was experimentally adopted in 2006;
- Friulian: "Grafie uficiâl" created by the Osservatori Regjonâl de Lenghe e de Culture Furlanis;
- Ladin: "Grafia Ladina" created by the Istituto Ladin de la Dolomites;
- Venetian: "Grafia Veneta Unitaria", the official manual published in 1995 by the Regione Veneto local government, although written in Italian. It has been recently updated on 14 December 2017, under the name of "Grafia Veneta Ufficiale".

== Gallery ==
Officially recognised ethno-linguistic minorities of Italy

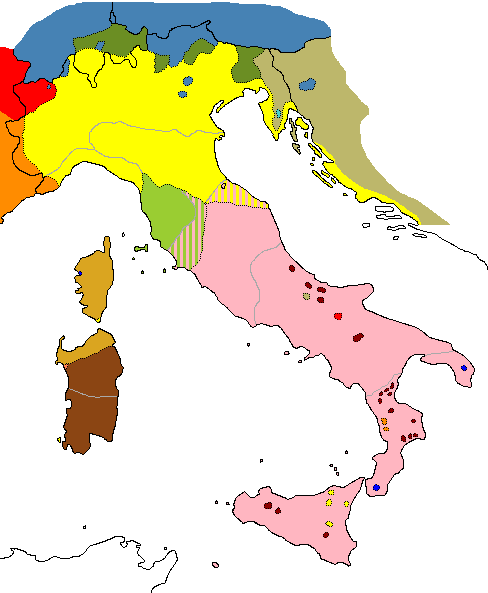
Regional languages of Italy according to Clemente Merlo and Carlo Tagliavini in 1939

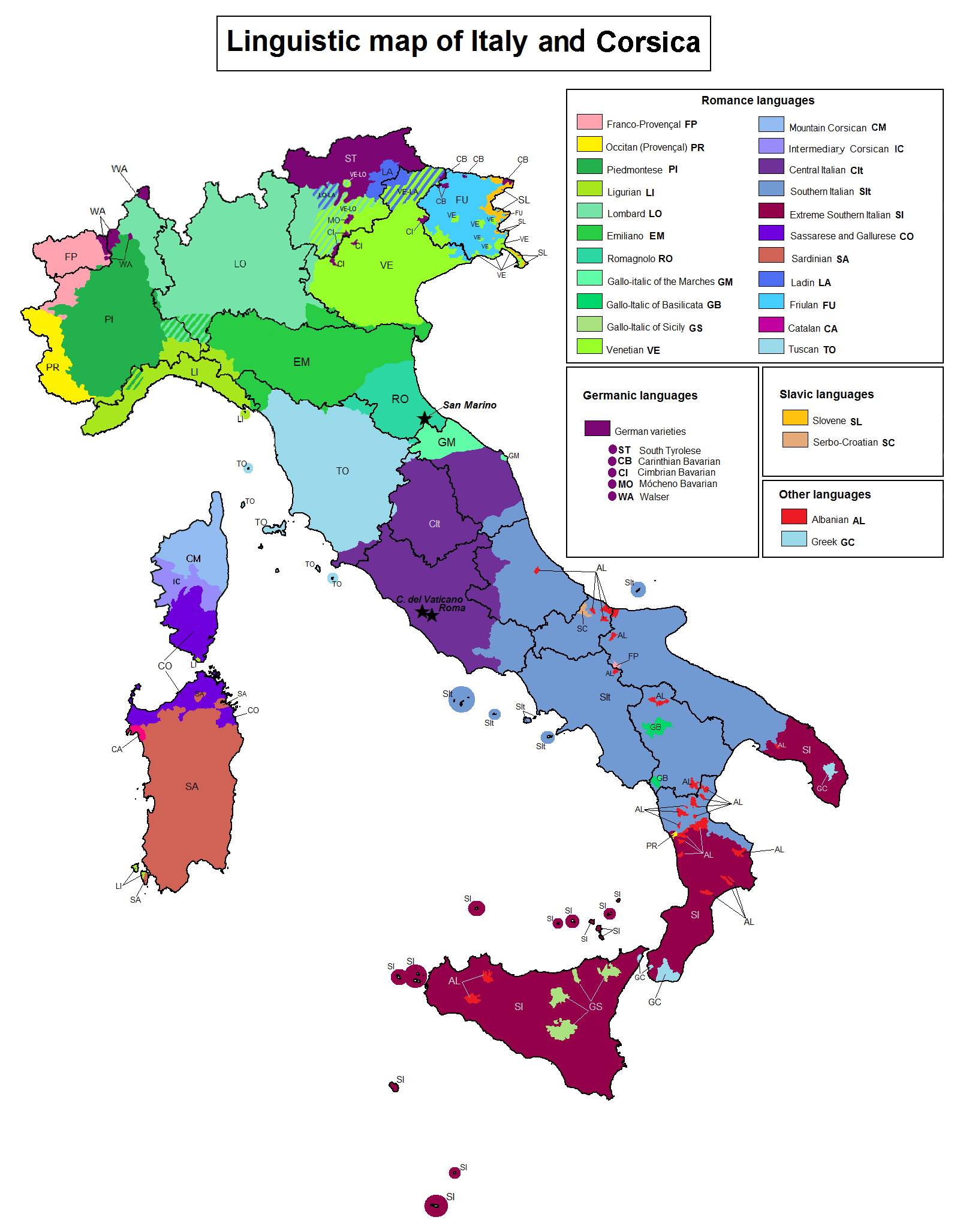
Languages and language islands of Italy

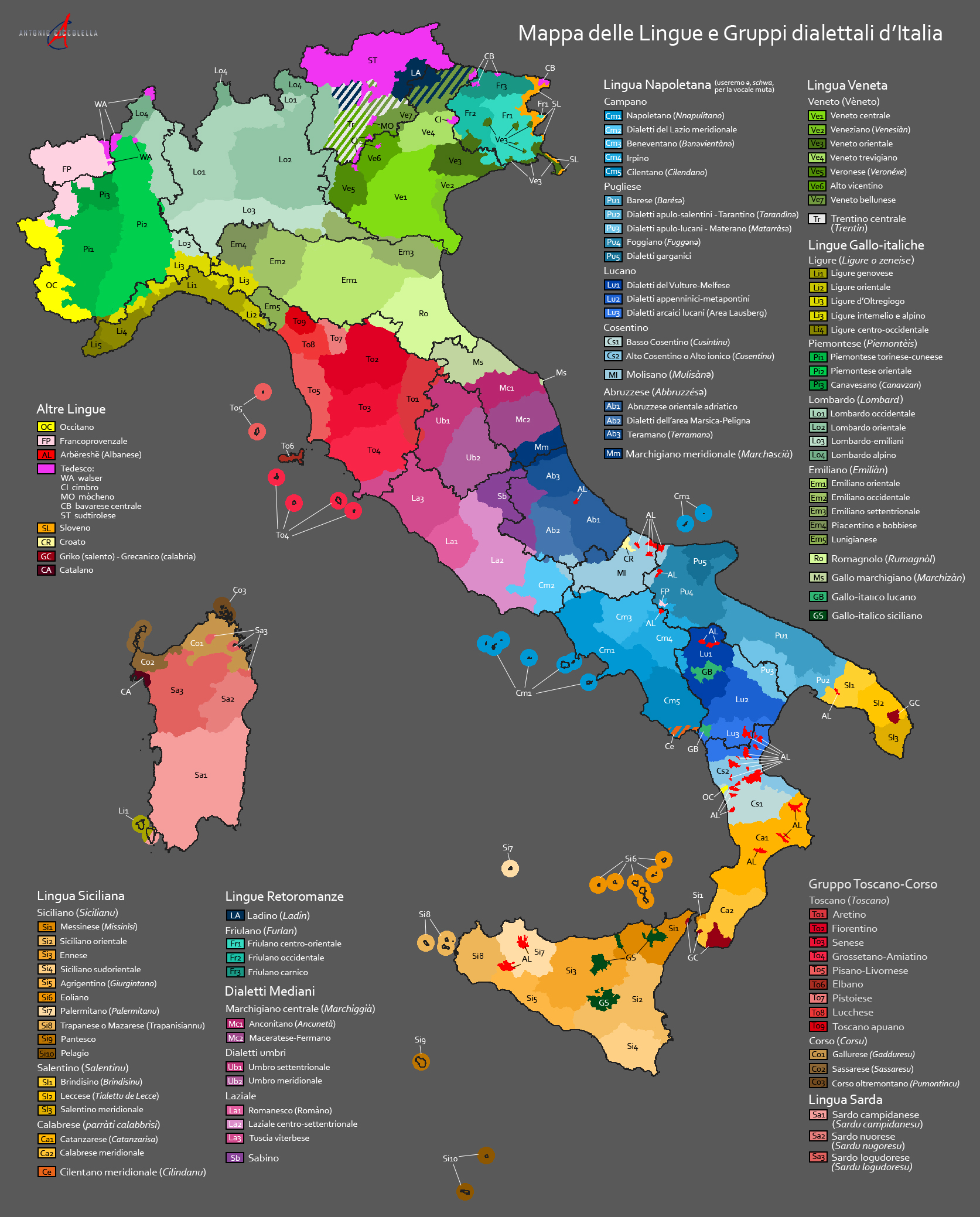
Languages of Italy

Main dialectal groups of Italy

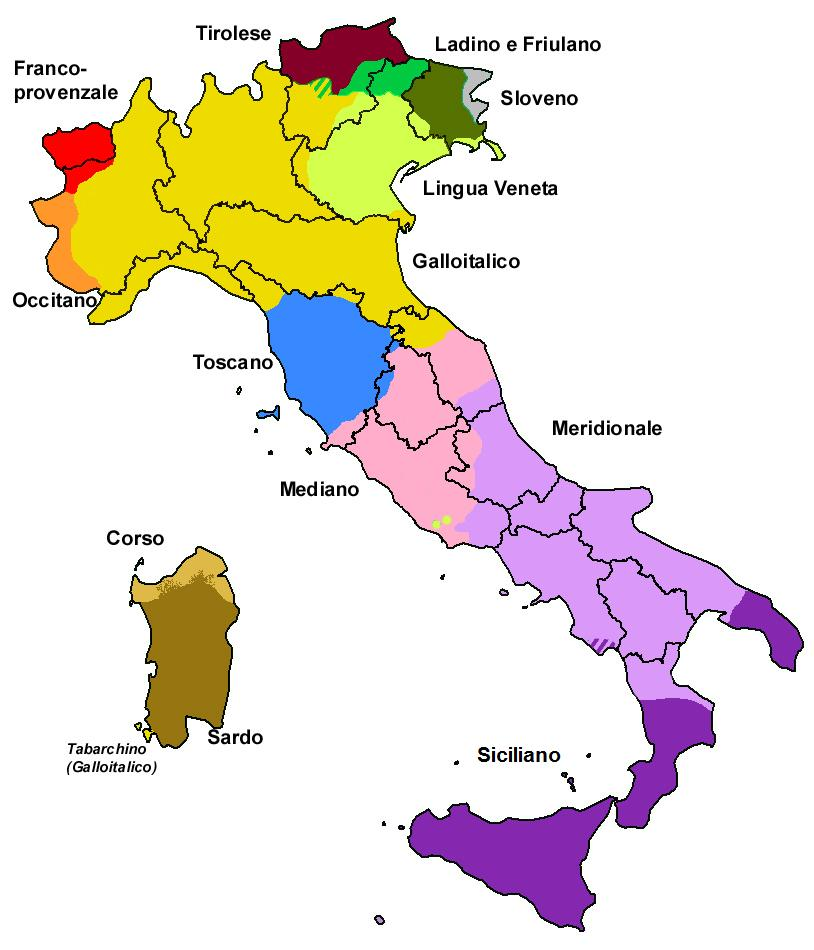
Main linguistic groups of Italy

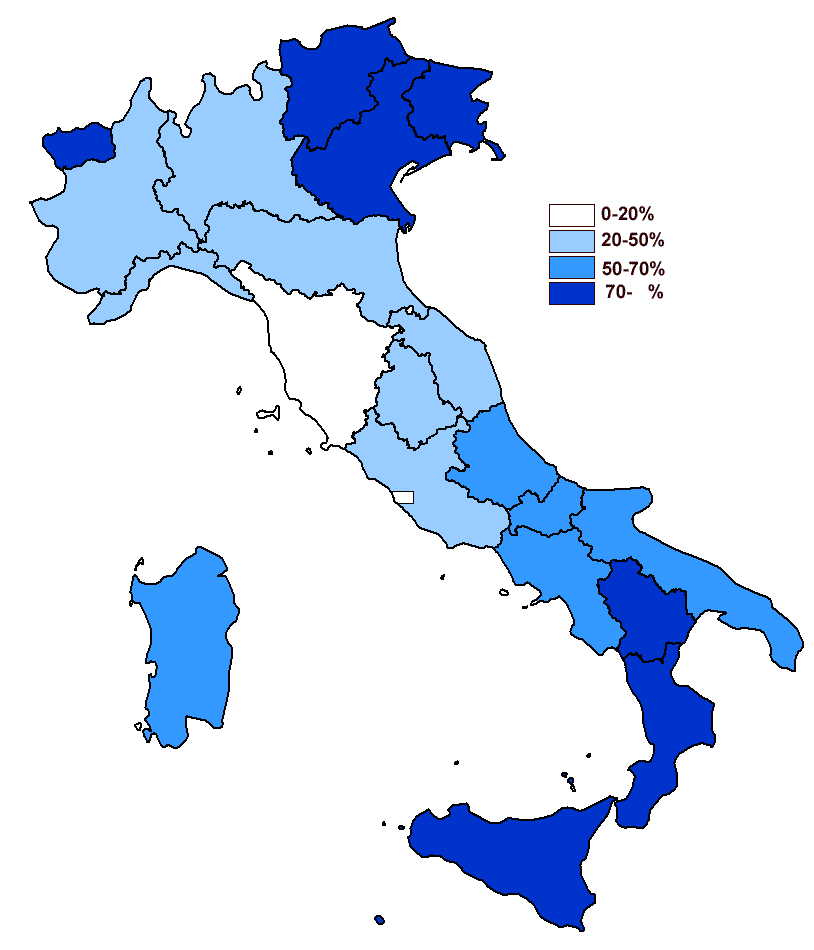
Percentage of people in Italy having a command of a regional language (Doxa, 1982; Coveri's data, 1984)

== See also ==
- Bilingual sign
- Language geography
- Regional Italian

== Bibliography ==
- Cravens, Thomas D. (2014). "Italia Linguistica and the European Charter for Regional or Minority Languages". Forum Italicum. 48 (2): 202–218. doi:10.1177/0014585814529221. S2CID 145721889.
- Hajek, John (1997), "Emilia-Romagna", in Maiden, Martin; Parry, Mair (eds.), The Dialects of Italy, London and New York: Routledge, pp. 271–278
- Loporcaro, Michele (2009). Profilo linguistico dei dialetti italiani (in Italian). Bari: Laterza.
- Maiden, Martin; Parry, Mair (1997). The Dialects of Italy. London and New York: Routledge.
- Marcato, Carla (2007). Dialetto, dialetti e italiano (in Italian). Bologna: Il Mulino.
- Posner, Rebecca (1996). The Romance languages. Cambridge: Cambridge University Press.
- Pellegrini, Giovan Battista (1977). Carta dei dialetti d'Italia (in Italian). Pisa: Pacini.
- Repetti, Lori, ed. (2000). Phonological Theory and the Dialects of Italy. Amsterdam Studies in the Theory and History of Linguistic Science, Series IV Current Issues in Linguistic Theory. Vol. 212. Amsterdam/Philadelphia: John Benjamins Publishing.
