= Bersntol =

Valley in Trentino, Italy

- Fersental; Valle del Fersina; Valle dei Mòcheni
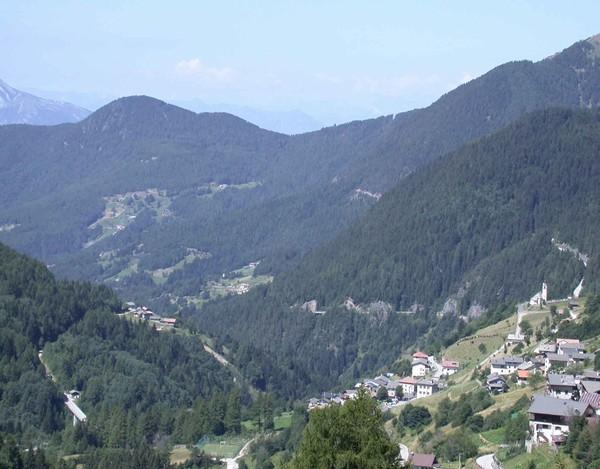
- The Bersntol, with the village of Palai en Bersntol

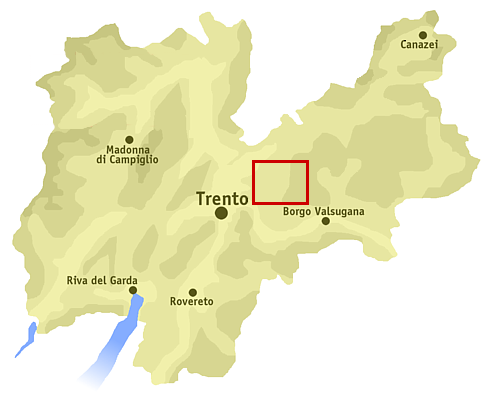
- Map of Trentino with Bernstol valley marked in red

Geography
- Location: Autonomous Province of Trento, Italy
- Population centers: Fierozzo; Frassilongo; Palù del Fersina; Sant'Orsola Terme
- Coordinates: 46°06′N 11°18′E
- Rivers: Fersina

The Bersntol (German: Fersental, Italian: Valle del Fersina) is a valley in the Autonomous Province of Trento, in north-eastern Italy. The Fersina river runs through it. It is also known as the Valle dei Mòcheni after its inhabitants, who speak the Upper German Mòcheno language.

== History ==
Since the 14th century the valley has been home to a Mòcheno-speaking population of Upper German origin, and is a language island of the Mòcheno language.

The valley is part of the district of Alta Valsugana e Bersntol.

== Population ==
The four municipalities of the valley are Vlarötz, Garait, Palai en Bersntol, and Sant'Orsola Terme. Approximately half of the valley's inhabitants declared themselves members of the Mòcheno linguistic group (the majority in the first three municipalities, and a minority in Sant'Orsola Terme, which is the most populous municipality).

The Pezzata Mòchena breed of domestic goat originates in the valley.
