= Samone =

Samone may refer to:

- Samone, Piedmont in the province of Torino, Italy
- Samone, Trentino in the province of Trento, Italy
- Samone, a subdivision of the village of Guiglia in the province of Modena, Italy
