= Ronchi Valsugana =

- Comune
- Comune di Ronchi Valsugana
- Location within Italy Location within Trentino-Alto Adige/Südtirol
- Coordinates: 46°4′N 11°26′E
- Country: Italy
- Region: Trentino-Alto Adige/Südtirol
- Province: Trentino (TN)

Government
  - Mayor: Federico Maria Ganarin

Area
  - Total: 10.0 km^{2} (3.9 sq mi)

Population (Dec. 2004)
  - Total: 380
  - Density: 38/km^{2} (98/sq mi)
- Time zone: UTC+1 (CET)
  - Summer (DST): UTC+2 (CEST)
- Postal code: 38051
- Dialing code: 0461
- Website: Official website

Ronchi Valsugana (I Rónchi in local dialect) is a comune (municipality) in Trentino in the northern Italian region Trentino-Alto Adige/Südtirol, located about 25 kilometres (16 mi) east of Trento. As of 31 December 2004, it had a population of 380 and an area of 10.0 square kilometres (3.9 mi^{2}).

Ronchi Valsugana borders the following municipalities: Torcegno, Roncegno and Borgo Valsugana.

== Demographic evolution ==
Historical population

Year	Pop.	±%
1861	?	—
1871	?	—
1881	?	—
1901	?	—
1911	?	—

Year	Pop.	±%
1921	708	—
1931	637	−10.0%
1936	546	−14.3%
1951	514	−5.9%
1961	459	−10.7%

Year	Pop.	±%
1971	429	−6.5%
1981	378	−11.9%
1991	352	−6.9%
2001	385	+9.4%

Source: Data from ISTAT
