= Borgo Valsugana =

- Comune
- Comune di Borgo Valsugana
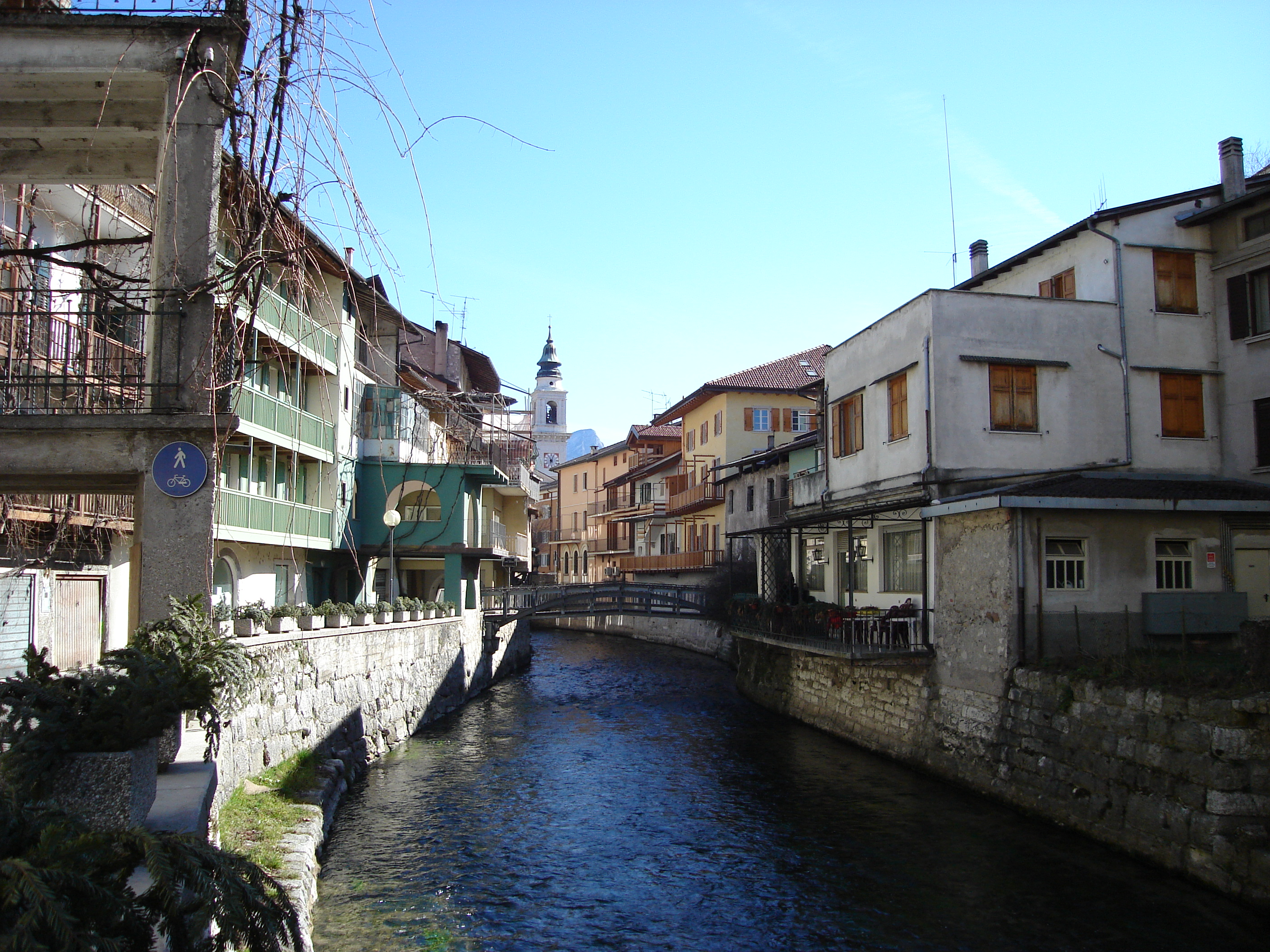
- The Brenta river in Borgo Valsugana.

- Coat of arms

- Location within Italy Location within Trentino-Alto Adige/Südtirol
- Coordinates: 46°3′N 11°27′E
- Country: Italy
- Region: Trentino-Alto Adige/Südtirol
- Province: Trentino (TN)
- Frazioni: Olle

Government
  - Mayor: Ferrai Martina

Area
  - Total: 52.3 km^{2} (20.2 sq mi)
- Elevation: 386 m (1,266 ft)

Population (2026)
  - Total: 7,252
  - Density: 139/km^{2} (359/sq mi)
- Demonym: Borghesani
- Time zone: UTC+1 (CET)
  - Summer (DST): UTC+2 (CEST)
- Postal code: 38051
- Dialing code: 0461
- Website: Official website

Borgo Valsugana (El Bórgo in local dialect) is a comune (municipality) in Trentino in the northern Italian region Trentino-Alto Adige/Südtirol, located about 30 kilometres (19 mi) east of Trento.

Borgo Valsugana borders the following municipalities: Telve, Telve di Sopra, Torcegno, Ronchi Valsugana, Roncegno, Castelnuovo, Novaledo, Levico Terme, and Asiago. It is one of I Borghi più belli d'Italia ("The most beautiful villages of Italy").

== Geography ==
Borgo is in one of the tightest parts of Valsugana, mount Ciolino and mount Rocchetta, neither very high. It grew on the two sides of river Brenta and its ancient part is the only one in Trentino to occupy both sides of a river (Trento, for instance, is located on only one side of river Adige).

== History ==
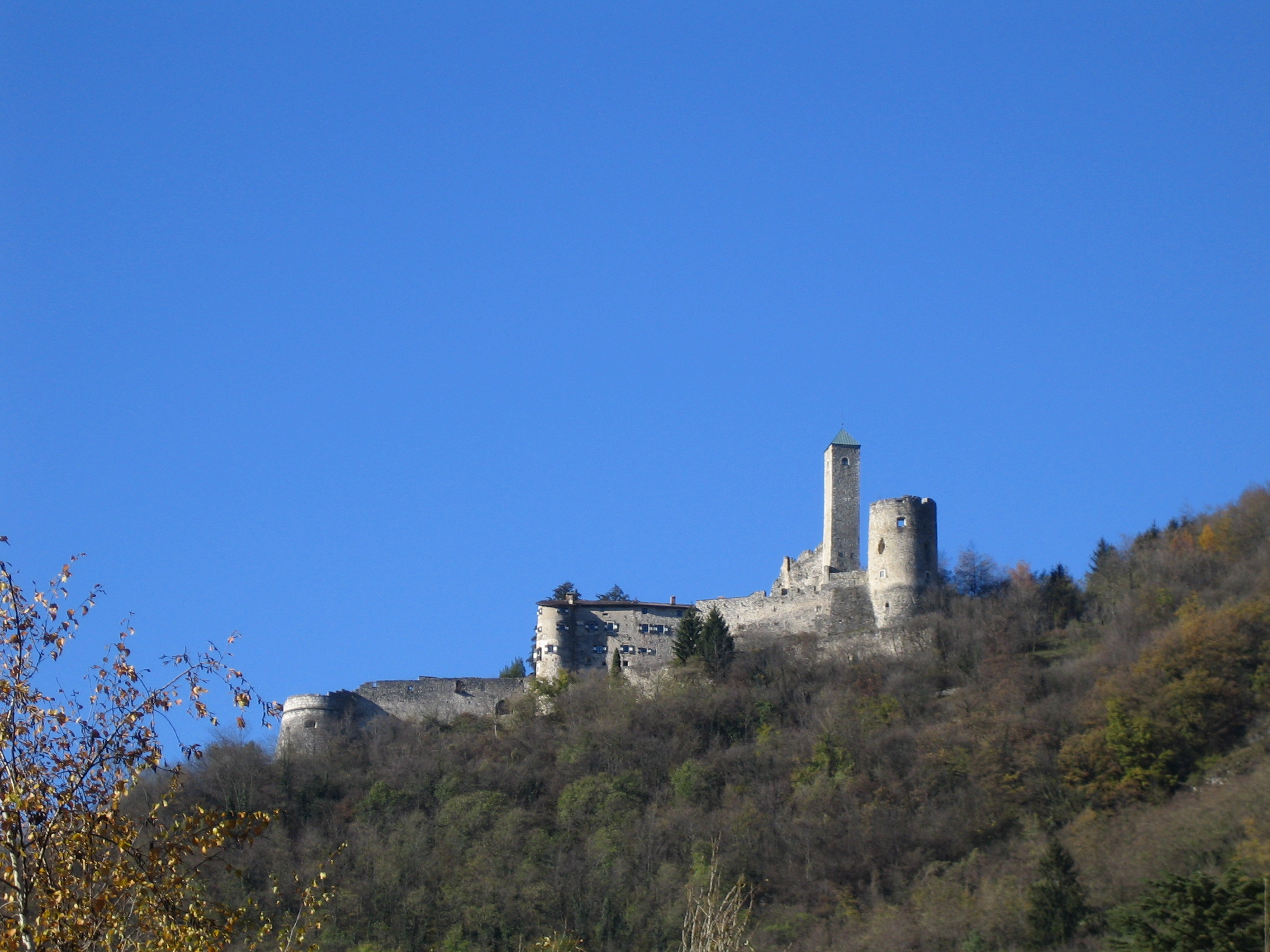
Castel Telvana

Borgo Valsugana, whose ancient name was Ausugum (the main street of the town, indeed, is named "Corso Ausugum"), used to be a Roman settlement along the Claudia Augusta Altinate road which connected Altino to Tridentum (ancient name for Trento) and then to Augsburg, nowadays in Germany.

Thanks to its location at the bottom of an open valley, the town always benefited from trade. Noblemen from Castelnuovo and Caldonazzo and the Welsperg family used to govern the town and its surroundings.

In 1862 a huge fire destroyed a large part of the town, whose buildings were largely built using wood.

From 1943 to 1945 the antifascist partisans fought in the framework of the "Gherlenda" battalion of the Garibaldine brigade "Antonio Gramsci" located in Feltre.

== People ==
- Alcide De Gasperi, president of the Council of ministers
- Matteo Trentin, professional road cyclist
