= Municipalities of Trentino =

Overview of the municipalities in Trentino

This is a list of the 166 municipalities (comuni/gemeinden) of the autonomous province of Trentino in the autonomous region of Trentino-Alto Adige/Südtirol in Italy. Some municipalities have a second official language such as German (Cimbrian and Mócheno) and Ladin. Most German names of municipalities however are historical apart from the previously mentioned communities. The Ladin variety of the Fassa Valley is currently the only officially recognized one, in contrast to the varieties of Non and Sole Valley).

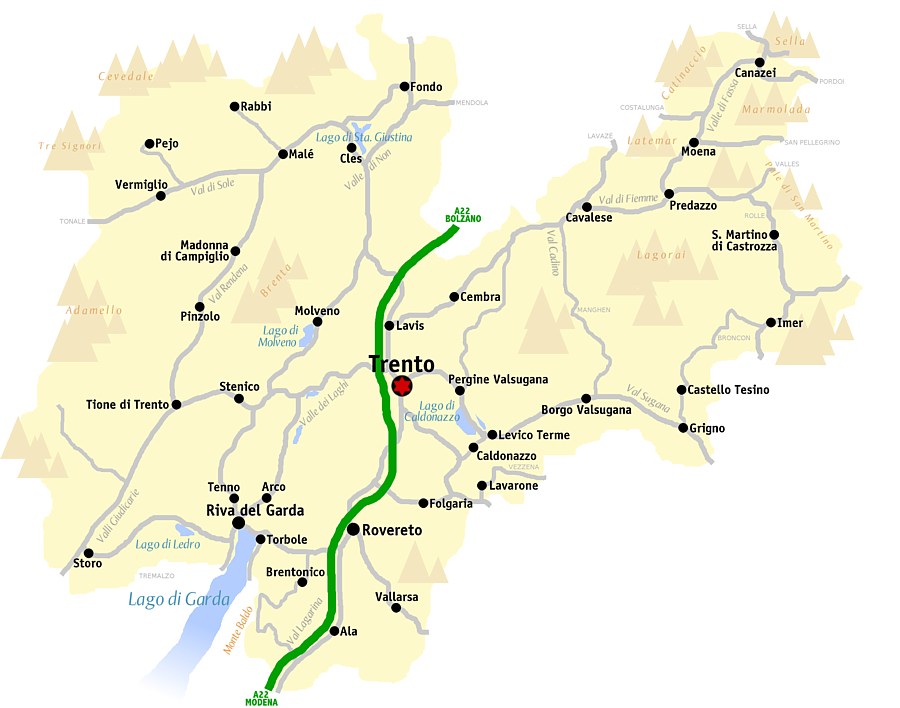
Map of Trentino

== List ==
Italian name	German name (including Cimbrian and Mócheno)	Ladin name	Population (2026)	Area (km²)	Density
Ala	Ahl am Etsch or Halla		8,898	119.87	74.2
Albiano	Albian		1,549	9.96	155.5
Aldeno	Aldein im Lagertal or Alden		3,360	8.97	374.6
Altavalle			1,645	33.56	49.0
Altopiano della Vigolana			5,201	45.03	115.5
Amblar-Don	Ambler-Thann or Daun		554	19.96	27.8
Andalo	Andel		1,237	11.38	108.7
Arco	Arch		17,747	63.22	280.7
Avio	Aue		4,118	68.90	59.8
Baselga di Pinè	Wasilig-Pineid		5,326	41.07	129.7
Bedollo	Bedull		1,500	27.46	54.6
Besenello	Bisein or Pysein		2,834	25.94	109.3
Bieno	Blein		481	11.71	41.1
Bleggio Superiore	Oberpless or Oberbletsch		1,545	32.67	47.3
Bocenago	Butschenach		410	8.45	48.5
Bondone	Bunden in Tirol		627	19.19	32.7
Borgo Chiese			1,926	53.71	35.9
Borgo d'Anaunia			2,601	63.23	41.1
Borgo Lares			734	22.63	32.4
Borgo Valsugana	Burg im Suganertal		7,252	52.37	138.5
Brentonico	Frenten		4,184	57.14	73.2
Bresimo	Brissen	Brésem	240	41.01	5.9
Caderzone Terme	St. Johann or Kaderzaun		692	18.61	37.2
Calceranica al Lago	Plaiff or Pleif or Kalkrain		1,397	3.39	412.1
Caldes	Kalteis, Kalds, Gildeis or Gilds	Chjaudes	1,122	20.81	53.9
Caldonazzo	Kalnetsch, Galnetsch or Gollnatsch		4,010	21.41	187.3
Calliano	Roßbach or Kallian		2,057	10.20	201.7
Campitello di Fassa	Kampidel im Fasstal	Ciampedèl	661	25.02	26.4
Campodenno	St. Michael or Gampden	Ciampdaden	1,532	25.02	61.2
Canal San Bovo	Kanal St. Buf		1,484	125.68	11.8
Canazei	Kanetschei, Kanzenei or Kanascheid	Cianacèi	1,903	67.02	28.4
Capriana	Kaferlan		598	12.82	46.6
Carisolo	Karezol or Karesel		895	25.12	35.6
Carzano	Carzan		518	1.82	284.6
Castel Condino	Kastelkunden		211	34.83	6.1
Castel Ivano			3,309	53.79	61.5
Castello Tesino	Kastelalt or Tasein		1,157	54.56	21.2
Castello-Molina di Fiemme	Kastell-Mühlen im Fleimstal		2,327	112.84	20.6
Castelnuovo	Neuenhaus		1,088	13.15	82.7
Cavalese	Gaßlöss	Ciavaleis	4,026	45.38	88.7
Cavareno	Gafrein or Kabarren	Ciavarén	1,155	9.48	121.8
Cavedago	Gofidach	Ciavedać	609	10.03	60.7
Cavedine	Kavedein		3,103	38.23	81.2
Cavizzana	Kavitzan or Kafitzian	Chjaviciana or Chjavizana	231	3.38	68.3
Cembra Lisignago	Zimmers or Zimber; Lisignàch		2,374	24.10	98.5
Cimone	Tschimun		743	9.81	75.7
Cinte Tesino	Zint or Zinten		352	30.30	11.6
Cis	Tscheiss		294	5.50	53.5
Civezzano	Zivernach or Ziffzen		4,177	15.67	266.6
Cles	Glöß	Clés or Cliès	7,480	39.17	191.0
Comano Terme	Komaun		3,059	68.11	44.9
Commezzadura	Kommedür	Comezadurå	1,005	22.03	45.6
Contà			1,423	19.48	73.0
Croviana	Korfelan or Karfenian		677	4.99	135.7
Dambel	Nombel	Dambel	391	5.15	75.9
Denno	Thenn	Den	1,246	10.64	117.1
Dimaro Folgarida	Diemmer or Dietmarsdorf	Dimàr	2,130	36.53	58.3
Drena	Drenn		609	8.34	73.0
Dro	Drau		5,088	27.95	182.0
Fai della Paganella	Oberpfeidt or Welsch-Faid		941	12.13	77.6
Fiavè	Flawey		1,103	24.28	45.4
Fierozzo	Florutz (Mócheno: Vlarötz)		454	17.94	25.3
Folgaria	Vielgereuth (Cimbrian: Folgrait)		3,169	71.63	44.2
Fornace	Braunstein		1,363	7.22	188.8
Frassilongo	Gereut (Mócheno: Garait)		336	16.68	20.1
Garniga Terme	Garnich		427	13.13	32.5
Giovo	Jaufen		2,518	20.81	121.0
Giustino	Zustin, Justen or Jobsten		752	39.39	19.1
Grigno	Grims		2,030	46.39	43.8
Imer	Immer or Almern		1,152	27.73	41.5
Isera	Iser		2,816	14.09	199.9
Lavarone	Lafraun (Cimbrian: Lavròu)		1,205	26.32	45.8
Lavis	Laifs		9,208	12.18	756.0
Ledro	Löder		5,478	156.39	35.0
Levico Terme	Löweneck		8,334	62.83	132.6
Livo	Lifers	Lìo or Lìu	774	15.22	50.9
Lona-Lases	Lohne-Lazes		882	11.37	77.6
Luserna	Lusern	Lusérn	263	8.20	32.1
Madruzzo			3,006	28.94	103.9
Malè	Maleit or Freienthurn		2,296	26.53	86.5
Massimeno	Maximin		134	21.03	6.4
Mazzin	Matzin	Mazin	616	23.63	26.1
Mezzana	Metzlan	Mezanå	883	27.35	32.3
Mezzano	Matzan im Taufers or Mitterdorf		1,584	48.85	32.4
Mezzocorona	Kronmetz or Deutschmetz		5,462	25.35	215.5
Mezzolombardo	Welsch-Metz		7,799	13.88	561.9
Moena	Mön or Moyen	Moéna	2,551	82.60	30.9
Molveno	Malfein		1,100	34.12	32.2
Mori	Moor in Tirol		10,328	40.08	257.7
Nago-Torbole	Naag-Turbel		2,732	28.39	96.2
Nogaredo	Schöffbrück		2,104	3.61	582.8
Nomi	Nogareit		1,360	6.49	209.6
Novaledo	Numig		1,151	7.97	144.4
Novella	Neuleit		3,581	46.59	76.9
Ospedaletto	Spittal bei Yfän		792	16.75	47.3
Ossana	Wulsan or Wulsein		826	25.25	32.7
Palù del Fersina	Palai im Fersental (Mócheno: Palai/Palae en Bersntol)		173	16.65	10.4
Panchià	Weissbach		819	20.21	40.5
Peio	Peil or Pell		1,795	162.33	11.1
Pellizzano	Pletzen		740	48.36	15.3
Pelugo	Paluch		388	22.98	16.9
Pergine Valsugana	Persen or Fersen im Suganertal		21,635	54.33	398.2
Pieve di Bono-Prezzo	Bauner Pleif-Pretz		1,461	24.68	59.2
Pieve Tesino	Tesin		666	69.23	9.6
Pinzolo	Pinzol		3,076	69.32	44.4
Pomarolo	Pommaröl		2,416	9.23	261.8
Porte di Rendena			1,814	40.72	44.5
Predaia			7,054	80.05	88.1
Predazzo	Pardatsch		4,510	109.97	41.0
Primiero San Martino di Castrozza			4,964	200.06	24.8
Rabbi	Rabben		1,374	132.79	10.3
Riva del Garda	Reiff am Gartsee		17,758	40.73	436.0
Romeno	Romein	Romen	1,529	9.13	167.5
Roncegno Terme	Rundscheinberg		3,020	38.08	79.3
Ronchi Valsugana	Raut or Rautberg		450	10.00	45.0
Ronzo-Chienis	Rontz-Klens		1,004	13.21	76.0
Ronzone	Rontzaun		515	5.30	97.2
Roverè della Luna	Eichholz or Aichholz		1,658	10.41	159.3
Rovereto	Rofreit or Rovreit		40,513	50.99	794.5
Ruffrè-Mendola	Ruffreit-Mendel		399	6.58	60.6
Rumo	Run or Räu	Rum	783	30.85	25.4
Sagron Mis	Sagraun		171	11.06	15.5
Samone	Samon		540	4.90	110.2
San Giovanni di Fassa		Sèn Jan di Fassa	3,633	99.82	36.4
San Lorenzo Dorsino	St. Lorenz Dursin		1,565	73.92	21.2
San Michele all'Adige	St. Michael an der Etsch or Welsch St. Michael		4,098	16.00	256.1
Sant'Orsola Terme	Eichberg or St. Urschl		1,141	15.36	74.3
Sanzeno	Sanzinnen am Nonsberg	Sanzen	900	7.88	114.2
Sarnonico	Sarnunich	Sarnoneć	783	12.19	64.2
Scurelle	Schurell		1,381	30.00	46.0
Segonzano	Segunzan		1,408	20.71	68.0
Sella Giudicarie			2,985	85.76	34.8
Sfruz	Sfrutz		383	11.81	32.4
Soraga di Fassa	Überwasser	Soraga, Soréga	714	19.75	36.2
Sover	Sofer		807	14.82	54.5
Spiazzo	Splatz or Pleif		1,275	71.07	17.9
Spormaggiore	Altspaur	Spogrant	1,293	30.20	42.8
Sporminore	Neuspaur	Sporpiciol	722	17.47	41.3
Stenico	Steinig or Steineck		1,186	49.15	24.1
Storo	Stauer		4,495	62.94	71.4
Strembo	Stremben		571	38.33	14.9
Telve	Telf		1,938	64.75	29.9
Telve di Sopra	Obertelf		618	17.72	34.9
Tenna	Tann or Atzenach		1,063	3.11	341.8
Tenno	Tinnebach or Thenn		2,054	28.30	72.6
Terragnolo	Leimtal (Cimbrian: Leimtal)		703	39.57	17.8
Terre d'Adige			3,128	16.58	188.7
Terzolas	Knappendorf, Terzels or Tertzeleis	Tergiolàs	644	5.59	115.2
Tesero	Teser im Fleimstal		2,996	50.55	59.3
Tione di Trento	Taun, Teyen or Tillen		3,772	33.45	112.8
Ton	Thun		1,306	26.28	49.7
Torcegno	Türtchein		704	15.19	46.3
Trambileno	Trumbeleis		1,519	50.70	30.0
Tre Ville			1,359	81.49	16.7
Trento	Trient		119,359	157.88	756.0
Valdaone			1,165	177.09	6.6
Valfloriana	Welsch-Flörian		477	39.33	12.1
Vallarsa	Brandtal (Cimbrian: Brandtal)		1,400	77.87	18.0
Vallelaghi			5,227	72.45	72.1
Vermiglio	Ulzbach, Warmei or Wermel	Verméi	1,767	95.64	18.5
Vignola-Falesina	Walzburg-Falisen		217	11.95	18.2
Villa Lagarina	Lagertaldorf		3,865	24.13	160.2
Ville d'Anaunia	Randendorf		4,659	89.13	52.3
Ville di Fiemme			2,633	46.15	57.1
Volano	Nussdorf		3,182	10.74	296.3
Ziano di Fiemme	Zanon		1,752	35.75	49.0

== See also ==
- List of municipalities of Trentino-Alto Adige/Südtirol
- List of municipalities of Italy
- Prontuario dei nomi locali dell'Alto Adige
