= Telve =

- Comune
- Comune di Telve
- Location within Italy Location within Trentino-Alto Adige/Südtirol
- Coordinates: 46°4′N 11°29′E
- Country: Italy
- Region: Trentino-Alto Adige/Südtirol
- Province: Trentino (TN)

Government
  - Mayor: Matteo Degaudenz

Area
  - Total: 64.8 km^{2} (25.0 sq mi)
- Elevation: 548 m (1,798 ft)

Population (Dec. 2004)
  - Total: 1,914
  - Density: 29.5/km^{2} (76.5/sq mi)
- Time zone: UTC+1 (CET)
  - Summer (DST): UTC+2 (CEST)
- Postal code: 38050
- Dialing code: 0461
- Website: Official website

Telve (Télve in local dialect) is a comune (municipality) in Trentino in the northern Italian region Trentino-Alto Adige/Südtirol, located about 30 kilometres (19 mi) east of Trento. As of 31 December 2004, it had a population of 1,914 and an area of 64.8 square kilometres (25.0 mi^{2}).

Telve borders the following municipalities: Castello-Molina di Fiemme, Valfloriana, Pieve Tesino, Scurelle, Baselga di Pinè, Palù del Fersina, Telve di Sopra, Carzano, Borgo Valsugana and Castelnuovo.

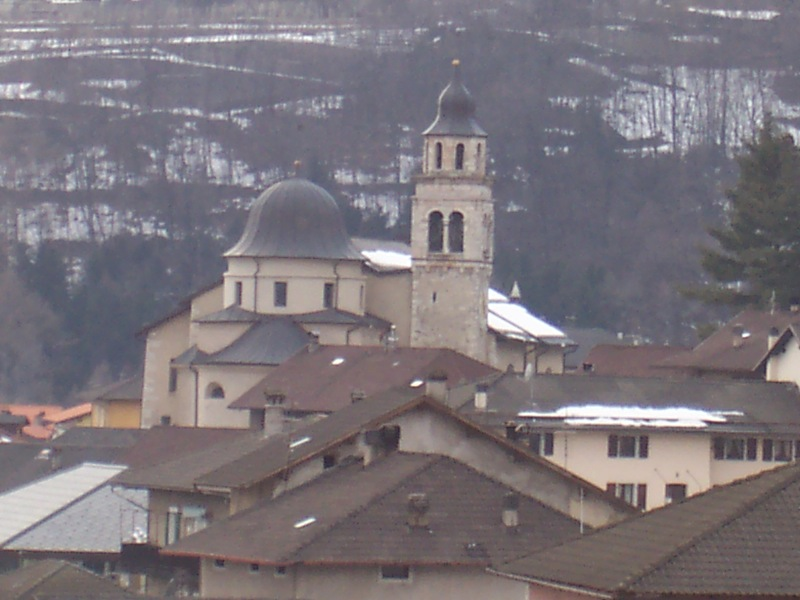
Santa Maria Assunta church

== Demographic evolution ==
Historical population

Year	Pop.	±%
1861	?	—
1871	?	—
1881	?	—
1901	?	—
1911	?	—

Year	Pop.	±%
1921	1,757	—
1931	1,737	−1.1%
1936	1,557	−10.4%
1951	1,620	+4.0%
1961	1,580	−2.5%

Year	Pop.	±%
1971	1,686	+6.7%
1981	1,740	+3.2%
1991	1,728	−0.7%
2001	1,887	+9.2%

Source: Data from ISTAT
