= Torcegno =

- Comune
- Comune di Torcegno
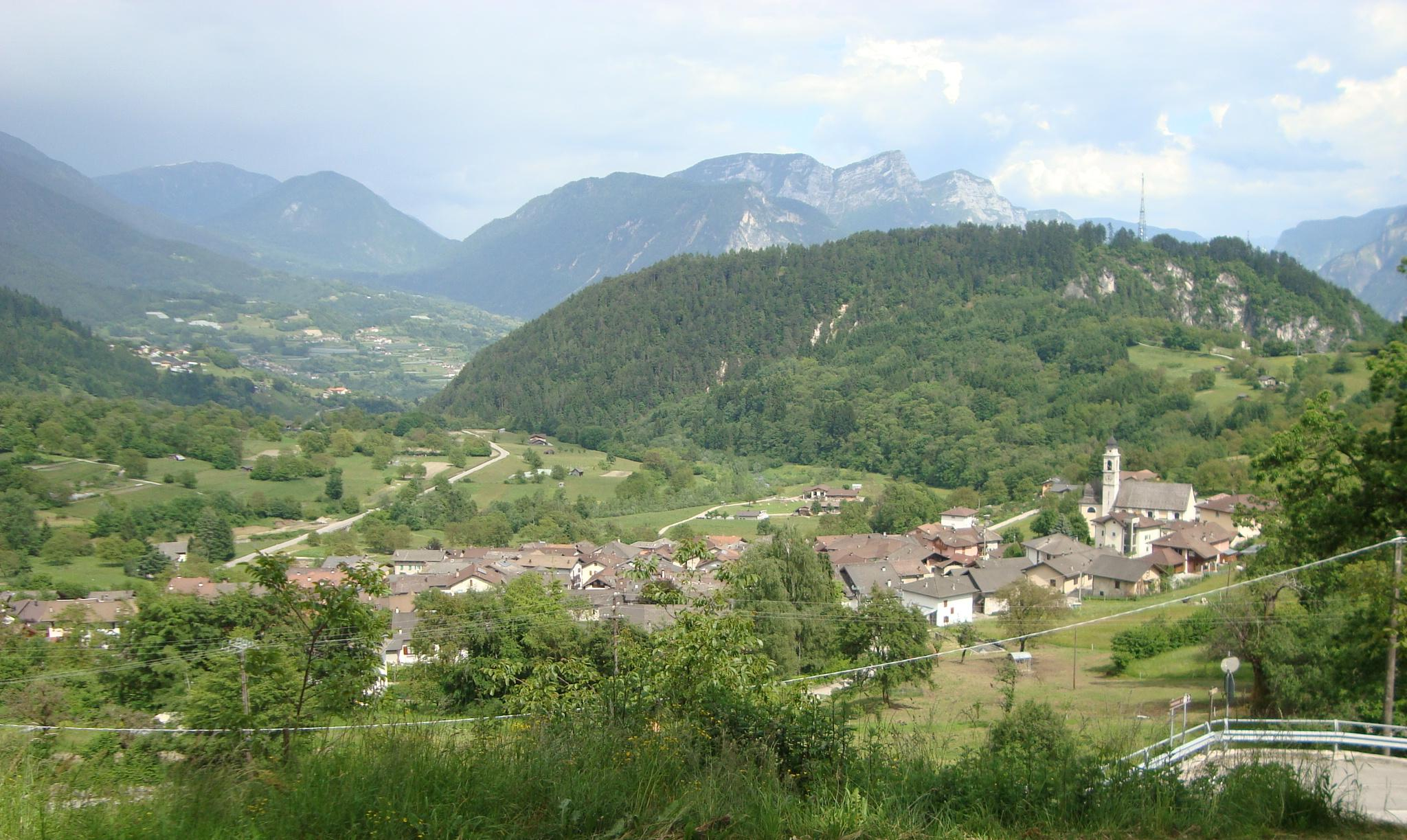

- Location within Italy Location within Trentino-Alto Adige/Südtirol
- Coordinates: 46°4′N 11°27′E
- Country: Italy
- Region: Trentino-Alto Adige/Südtirol
- Province: Trentino (TN)
- Frazioni: Campestrini, Mocchi

Government
  - Mayor: Daniela Campestrin

Area
  - Total: 15.2 km^{2} (5.9 sq mi)
- Elevation: 769 m (2,523 ft)

Population (31 December 2015)
  - Total: 697
  - Density: 45.9/km^{2} (119/sq mi)
- Demonym(s): Torcegnesi, Torsegnati
- Time zone: UTC+1 (CET)
  - Summer (DST): UTC+2 (CEST)
- Postal code: 38051
- Dialing code: 0461
- Website: Official website

Torcegno (Torzén or Traozén in local dialect) is a comune (municipality) in Trentino, in the Italian region of Trentino-Alto Adige/Südtirol, located about 35 kilometres (22 mi) east of Trento.

Torcegno borders the following municipalities: Palù del Fersina, Telve di Sopra, Fierozzo, Ronchi Valsugana, Roncegno Terme, Telve di Sopra and Borgo Valsugana.
