= Terzolas =

- Comune
- Comune di Terzolas
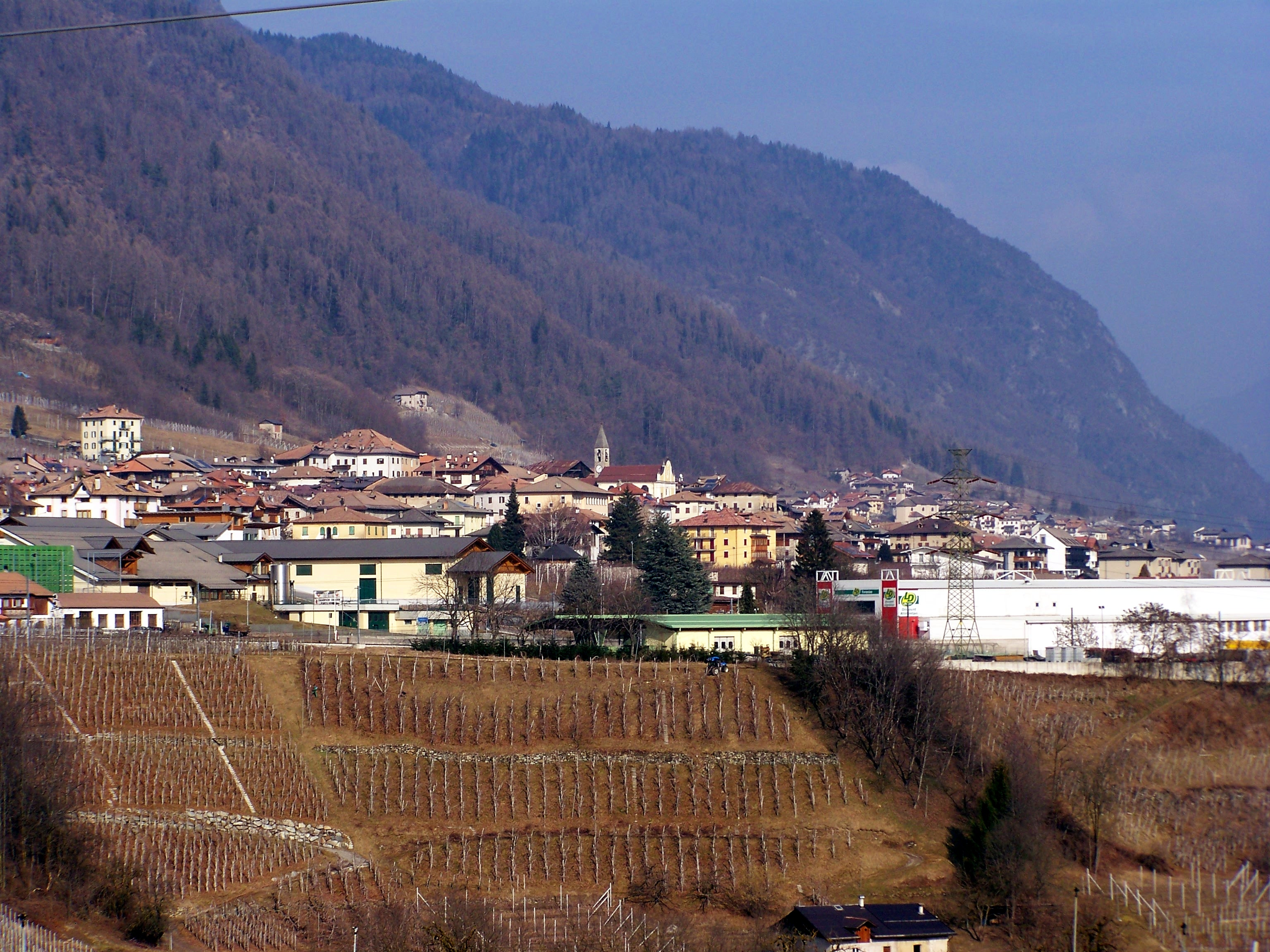

- Location within Italy Location within Trentino-Alto Adige/Südtirol
- Coordinates: 46°22′N 10°55′E
- Country: Italy
- Region: Trentino-Alto Adige/Südtirol
- Province: Trentino (TN)

Government
  - Mayor: Luciana Pedergnana

Area
  - Total: 5.4 km^{2} (2.1 sq mi)
- Elevation: 755 m (2,477 ft)

Population (Dec. 2004)
  - Total: 578
  - Density: 110/km^{2} (280/sq mi)
- Demonym: Tergiolasi
- Time zone: UTC+1 (CET)
  - Summer (DST): UTC+2 (CEST)
- Postal code: 38027
- Dialing code: 0463
- Website: Official website

Terzolas (Tergiolàs in local dialect) is a comune (municipality) in Trentino in the northern Italian region Trentino-Alto Adige/Südtirol, located about 35 kilometres (22 mi) northwest of Trento. As of 31 December 2004, it had a population of 578 and an area of 5.4 square kilometres (2.1 mi^{2}).

Terzolas borders the following municipalities: Malè, Caldes and Cles.

== Demographic evolution ==
Historical population

| Year | Pop. | ±% |
|---|---|---|
| 1861 | ? | — |
| 1871 | ? | — |
| 1881 | ? | — |
| 1901 | ? | — |
| 1911 | ? | — |

| Year | Pop. | ±% |
|---|---|---|
| 1921 | 577 | — |
| 1931 | 537 | −6.9% |
| 1936 | 530 | −1.3% |
| 1951 | 622 | +17.4% |
| 1961 | 611 | −1.8% |

| Year | Pop. | ±% |
|---|---|---|
| 1971 | 544 | −11.0% |
| 1981 | 528 | −2.9% |
| 1991 | 558 | +5.7% |
| 2001 | 558 | +0.0% |

Source: Data from ISTAT
