= Caines =

Caines may refer to:

- Caines (cigarette), Danish brand of cigarette
- Caines (surname)
- Kuens, town in Italy also known as Caines
- Tres Caínes, television series

== See also ==
- Caine (disambiguation)
