= Cavedago =

- Comune
- Comune di Cavedago
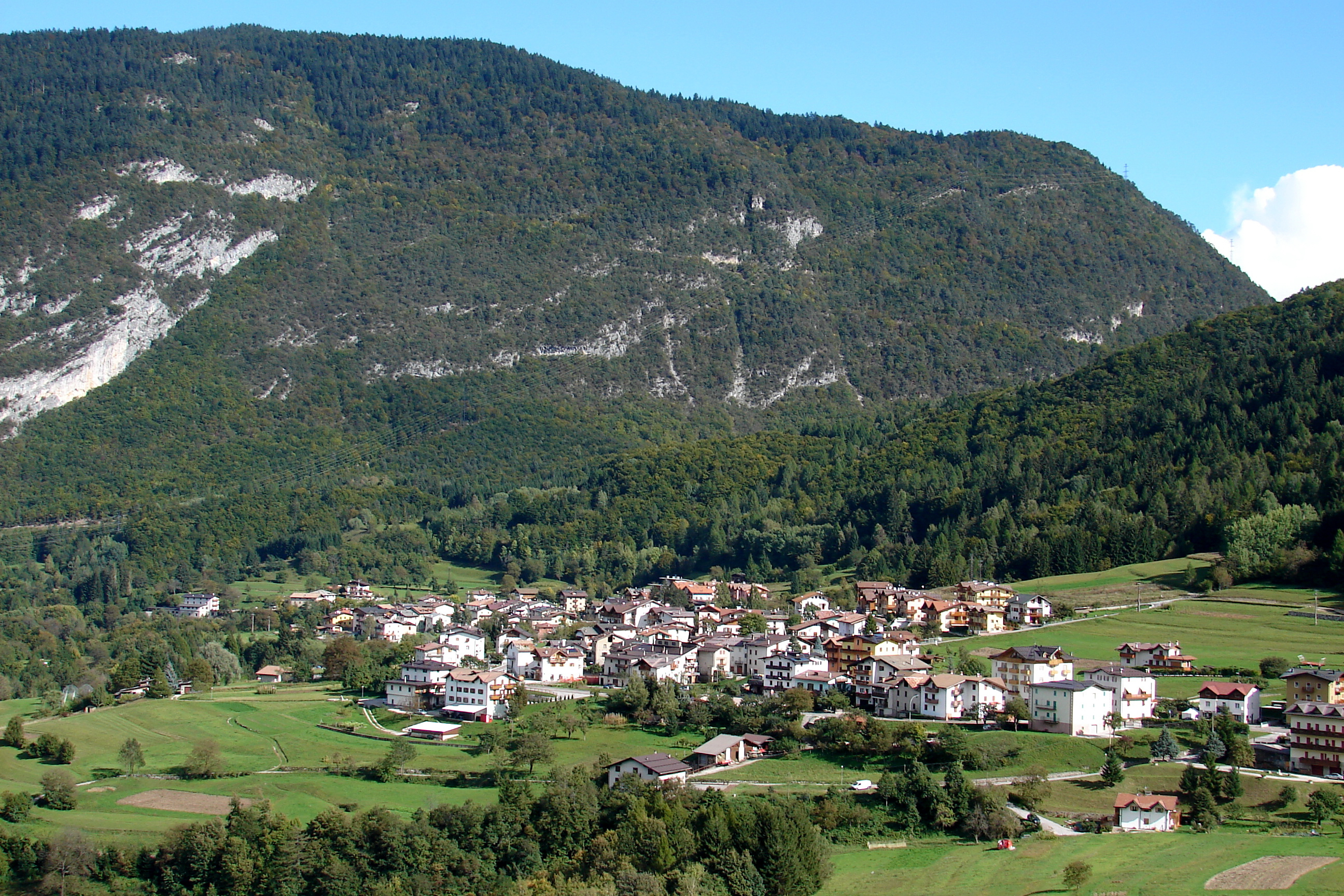

- Location within Italy Location within Trentino-Alto Adige/Südtirol
- Coordinates: 46°11′N 11°2′E
- Country: Italy
- Region: Trentino-Alto Adige/Südtirol
- Province: Trentino (TN)

Government
  - Mayor: Corrado Viola

Area
  - Total: 10.0 km^{2} (3.9 sq mi)

Population (2026)
  - Total: 609
  - Density: 60.9/km^{2} (158/sq mi)
- Time zone: UTC+1 (CET)
  - Summer (DST): UTC+2 (CEST)
- Postal code: 38010
- Dialing code: 0461
- Website: Official website

Cavedago (Ciavedàc or Ciavedài in local dialect) is a comune (municipality) in Trentino in the northern Italian region Trentino-Alto Adige/Südtirol, located about 14 kilometres (9 mi) northwest of Trento. As of 31 December 2004, it had a population of 507 and an area of 10.0 square kilometres (3.9 mi^{2}).

Cavedago borders the following municipalities: Spormaggiore, Fai della Paganella, Molveno, and Andalo.

== Demographic evolution ==
Historical population

Year	Pop.	±%
1861	?	—
1871	?	—
1881	?	—
1901	?	—
1911	?	—

Year	Pop.	±%
1921	868	—
1931	758	−12.7%
1936	687	−9.4%
1951	647	−5.8%
1961	574	−11.3%

Year	Pop.	±%
1971	520	−9.4%
1981	495	−4.8%
1991	442	−10.7%
2001	455	+2.9%

Source: Data from ISTAT
