= Sant'Orsola Terme =

Sant'Orsola Terme Oachpergh
- Comune
- Comune di Sant'Orsola Terme
- Coat of arms

- Location within Italy Location within Trentino-Alto Adige/Südtirol
- Coordinates: 46°7′N 11°18′E
- Country: Italy
- Region: Trentino-Alto Adige/Südtirol
- Province: Trentino (TN)

Government
  - Mayor: Andrea Fontanari

Area
  - Total: 15.4 km^{2} (5.9 sq mi)

Population (Dec. 2004)
  - Total: 933
  - Density: 60.6/km^{2} (157/sq mi)
- Time zone: UTC+1 (CET)
  - Summer (DST): UTC+2 (CEST)
- Postal code: 38050
- Dialing code: 0461
- Website: Official website

Sant'Orsola Terme (Mòcheno: Oachpergh) is a comune (municipality) in Trentino in the northern Italian region Trentino-Alto Adige/Südtirol, located about 15 kilometres (9 mi) northeast of Trento. As of 31 December 2004, it had a population of 933 and an area of 15.4 square kilometres (5.9 mi^{2}).

Sant'Orsola Terme borders the following municipalities: Bedollo, Baselga di Pinè, Palù del Fersina, Fierozzo, Frassilongo and Pergine Valsugana.

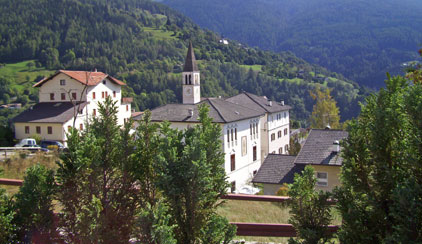
the church of Sant'Orsola Terme

== Demographic evolution ==
Historical population

Year	Pop.	±%
1861	?	—
1871	?	—
1881	?	—
1901	?	—
1911	?	—

Year	Pop.	±%
1921	1,070	—
1931	965	−9.8%
1936	961	−0.4%
1951	953	−0.8%
1961	960	+0.7%

Year	Pop.	±%
1971	904	−5.8%
1981	800	−11.5%
1991	789	−1.4%
2001	906	+14.8%

Source: Data from ISTAT
