= Cavizzana =

- Comune
- Comune di Cavizzana
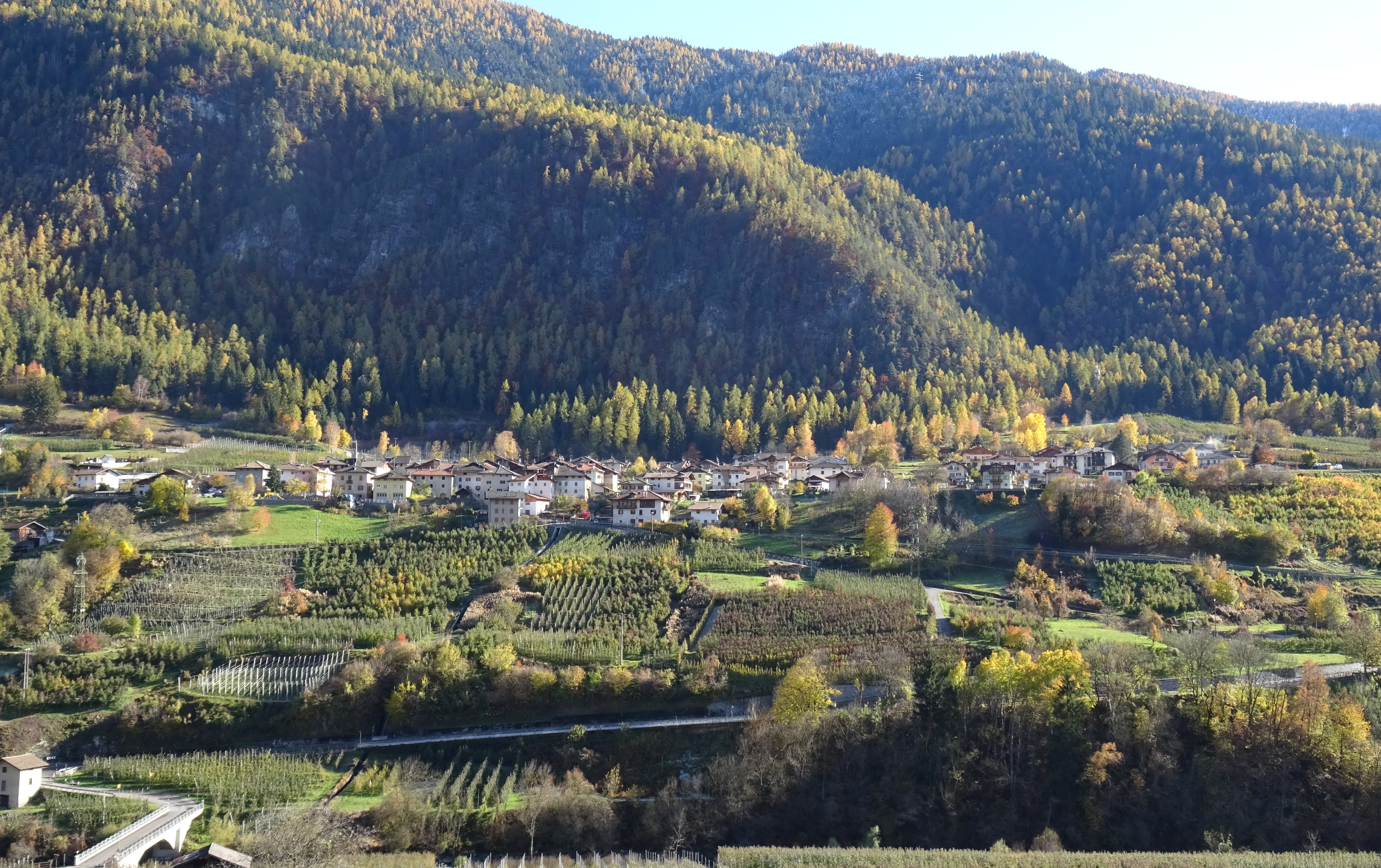

- Location within Italy Location within Trentino-Alto Adige/Südtirol
- Coordinates: 46°22′N 10°57′E
- Country: Italy
- Region: Trentino-Alto Adige/Südtirol
- Province: Trentino (TN)

Government
  - Mayor: Gianni Rizzi

Area
  - Total: 3.3 km^{2} (1.3 sq mi)

Population (2026)
  - Total: 231
  - Density: 70/km^{2} (180/sq mi)
- Time zone: UTC+1 (CET)
  - Summer (DST): UTC+2 (CEST)
- Postal code: 38022
- Dialing code: 0463
- Website: Official website

Cavizzana (Cjaviciana in local dialect) is a comune (municipality) in Trentino in the northern Italian region Trentino-Alto Adige/Südtirol, located about 35 kilometres (22 mi) northwest of Trento. As of 31 December 2004, it had a population of 239 and an area of 3.3 square kilometres (1.3 mi^{2}).

Cavizzana borders the following municipalities: Caldes and Cles.

== Demographic evolution ==
Historical population

Year	Pop.	±%
1861	?	—
1871	?	—
1881	?	—
1901	?	—
1911	?	—

Year	Pop.	±%
1921	296	—
1931	297	+0.3%
1936	258	−13.1%
1951	276	+7.0%
1961	289	+4.7%

Year	Pop.	±%
1971	245	−15.2%
1981	212	−13.5%
1991	199	−6.1%
2001	226	+13.6%

Source: Data from ISTAT
