= Telve di Sopra =

- Comune
- Comune di Telve di Sopra
- Location within Italy Location within Trentino-Alto Adige/Südtirol
- Coordinates: 46°4′N 11°28′E
- Country: Italy
- Region: Trentino-Alto Adige/Südtirol
- Province: Trentino (TN)

Government
  - Mayor: Bonella Giampaolo

Area
  - Total: 17.8 km^{2} (6.9 sq mi)

Population (Dec. 2004)
  - Total: 619
  - Density: 34.8/km^{2} (90.1/sq mi)
- Time zone: UTC+1 (CET)
  - Summer (DST): UTC+2 (CEST)
- Postal code: 38050
- Dialing code: 0461
- Website: Official website

Telve di Sopra (Tèlve de Sóra in local dialect) is a comune (municipality) in Trentino in the northern Italian region Trentino-Alto Adige/Südtirol, located about 25 kilometres (16 mi) east of Trento. As of 31 December 2004, it had a population of 619 and an area of 17.8 square kilometres (6.9 sq mi).

Telve di Sopra borders the following municipalities: Telve, Palù del Fersina, Torcegno and Borgo Valsugana.

== Demographic evolution ==
Historical population

Year	Pop.	±%
1861	?	—
1871	?	—
1881	?	—
1901	?	—
1911	?	—

Year	Pop.	±%
1921	605	—
1931	636	+5.1%
1936	619	−2.7%
1951	653	+5.5%
1961	659	+0.9%

Year	Pop.	±%
1971	645	−2.1%
1981	609	−5.6%
1991	619	+1.6%
2001	612	−1.1%

Source: Data from ISTAT
