= Mòcheno language =

Upper German variety of Italy

Mòcheno
- Bersntolerisch, Bersntoler sproch
- Native to: Italy
- Region: Bersntol
- Native speakers: 1,397 (2021)
- Language family: Indo-European: Germanic; West Germanic; Elbe Germanic; (High German); Upper German; Bavarian; Southern; Mòcheno

Language codes
- ISO 639-3: mhn
- Glottolog: moch1255
- ELP: Mócheno

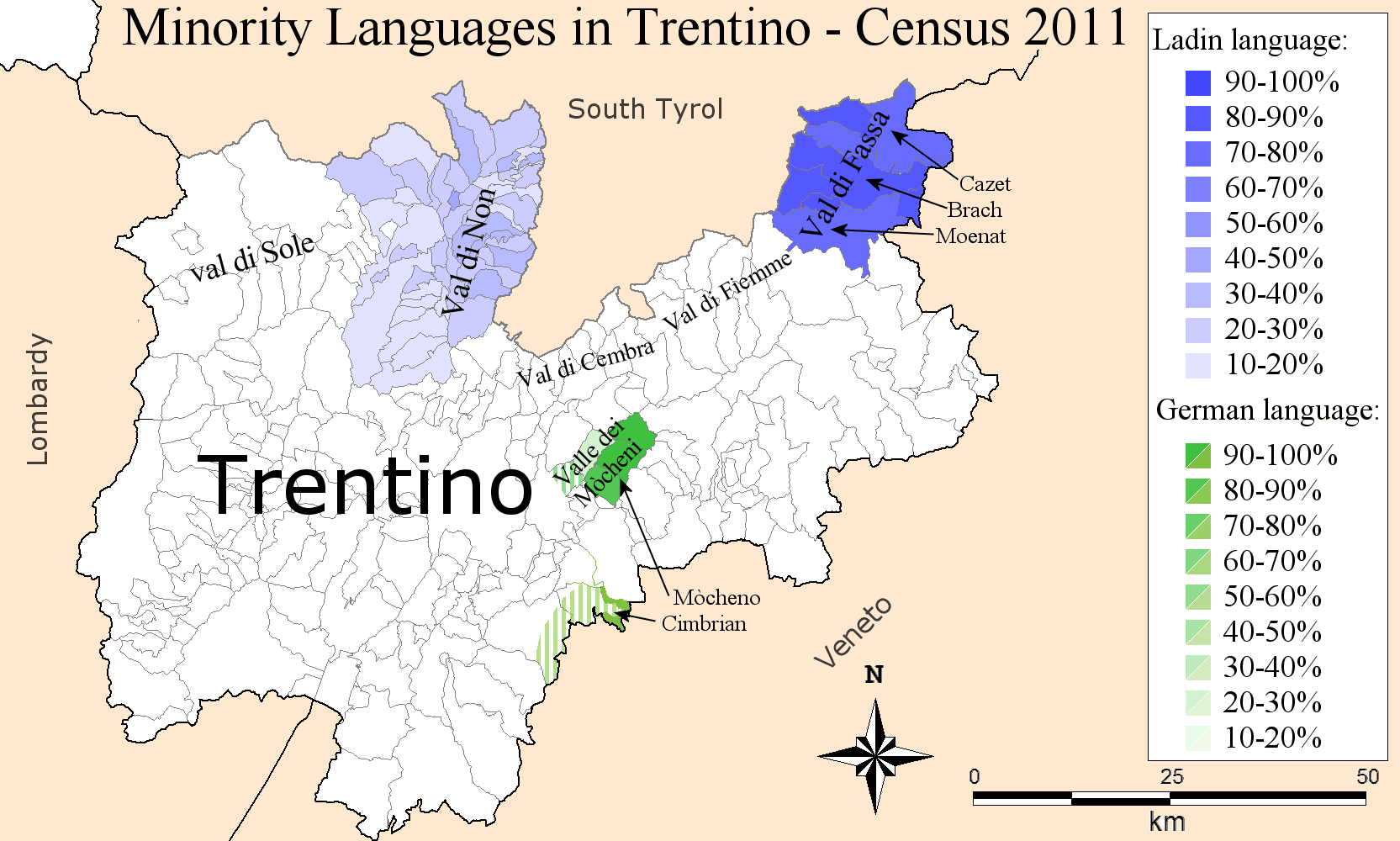
Mòcheno communities in Trentino

Mòcheno (Italian pronunciation: [ˈmɔːkeno]; German: Fersentalerisch; Bavarian: Bersntolerisch) is an Upper German variety spoken in three towns of the Bersntol (German: Fersental; Italian: Valle del Fersina), in Trentino, northeastern Italy.

Mòcheno is closely related to Bavarian and is variously classified either as a Southern Bavarian variety or a separate language of its own. It has also been posited that it may be descended from Lombardic (with influence from nearby dialects). Mòcheno speakers reportedly partially understand Bavarian, Cimbrian, or Standard German. However, many essential differences in grammar, vocabulary, and pronunciation render it difficult for speakers of Standard German to understand.

== Name ==
The name Mòcheni used by bilingual Italian- and Ladin-speaking neighbours to refer to the speakers of the language has been coined from the verb mòchen "to make", often used to build compound predicates in the language.

== Geographic distribution ==
According to the census of 2001, the first in which data on native languages were recorded, Mòcheno was spoken by a majority in the following municipalities (numbers of members of the Mòcheno linguistic group): Fierozzo/Florutz/Vlarotz (423 people, 95.92%), Palù/Palai/Palae (184 people, 95.34%), Frassilongo/Gereut/Garait (340 people, 95.24%, including the village of Roveda/Eichleit/Oachlait). In other municipalities of Trentino 1,329 persons declared themselves members of the Mòcheno linguistic group, a total of 2,276 in Trentino. In the 2011 census, the total number of speakers in the province decreased to 1,660.

== Status ==
Mòcheno is officially recognised in Trentino by provincial and national law. Starting in the 1990s, various laws and regulations have been passed by the Italian parliament and provincial assembly that put the Mòcheno language and culture under protection. A cultural institute was founded by decree, whose purpose is to safeguard and raise awareness of the language. School curricula were adapted in order to teach in Mòcheno, and Italian street signs are being changed to bilingual Mòcheno/Italian.

== Sample text ==
Mòcheno	German	English
Vatar ingar en Himbl, gahailegt kimmp der dai Núm. der dai Raich schellt kemmen.	Vater unser im Himmel, geheiligt werde Dein Name. Dein Reich komme.	Our Father in heaven, hallowed be Thy name. Thy kingdom come.
