= Samone, Trentino =

Samone
- Comune
- Comune di Samone
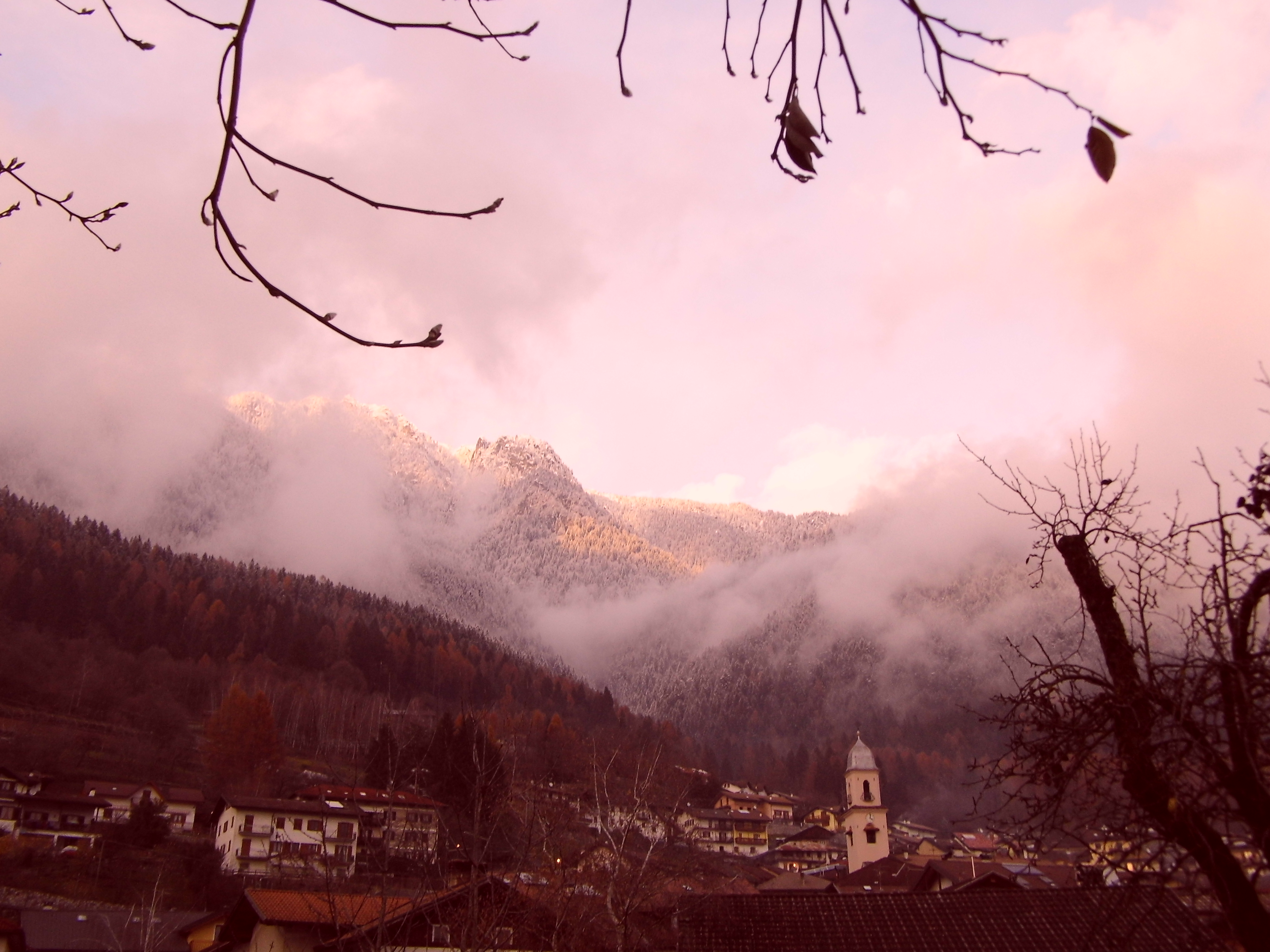

- Coat of arms

- Location within Italy Location within Trentino-Alto Adige/Südtirol
- Coordinates: 46°5′N 11°31′E
- Country: Italy
- Region: Trentino-Alto Adige/Südtirol
- Province: Trentino (TN)

Government
  - Mayor: Zanghellini Sergio

Area
  - Total: 4.9 km^{2} (1.9 sq mi)
- Elevation: 700 m (2,300 ft)

Population (31 August 2007)
  - Total: 532
  - Density: 110/km^{2} (280/sq mi)
- Demonym: Samonati
- Time zone: UTC+1 (CET)
  - Summer (DST): UTC+2 (CEST)
- Postal code: 38050
- Dialing code: 0125
- Website: Official website

Samone (Samón in local dialect) is a comune (municipality) in Trentino in the northern Italian region Trentino-Alto Adige/Südtirol, located about 30 kilometres (19 mi) east of Trento.

Samone is an enclave in the Castel Ivano municipality.
