= Fierozzo =

- Comune
- Comune di Fierozzo
- Coat of arms

- Location within Italy Location within Trentino-Alto Adige/Südtirol
- Coordinates: 46°7′N 11°19′E
- Country: Italy
- Region: Trentino-Alto Adige/Südtirol
- Province: Trentino (TN)

Government
  - Mayor: Lorenzo Moltrer

Area
  - Total: 17.9 km^{2} (6.9 sq mi)

Population (2026)
  - Total: 454
  - Density: 25.4/km^{2} (65.7/sq mi)
- Time zone: UTC+1 (CET)
  - Summer (DST): UTC+2 (CEST)
- Postal code: 38050
- Dialing code: 0461
- Website: Official website

Fierozzo (Mócheno: Vlarotz) is a comune (municipality) in Trentino in the northern Italian region Trentino-Alto Adige/Südtirol, located about 15 kilometres (9 mi) northeast of Trento. As of 31 December 2004, it had a population of 456 and an area of 17.9 square kilometres (6.9 mi^{2}). In the census of 2001, 423 inhabitants out of 441 (95.9%) declared themselves members of the Mócheno linguistic group.

Fierozzo borders the following municipalities: Palù del Fersina, Sant'Orsola Terme, Torcegno, Frassilongo and Roncegno.

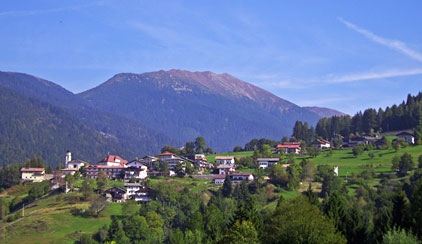
the town of Fierozzo

== Demographic evolution ==
Historical population

Year	Pop.	±%
1861	?	—
1871	?	—
1881	?	—
1901	?	—
1911	?	—

Year	Pop.	±%
1921	767	—
1931	678	−11.6%
1936	665	−1.9%
1951	601	−9.6%
1961	552	−8.2%

Year	Pop.	±%
1971	447	−19.0%
1981	438	−2.0%
1991	437	−0.2%
2001	441	+0.9%

Source: Data from ISTAT
