= Palù del Fersina =

- Comune
- Comune di Palù del Fersina
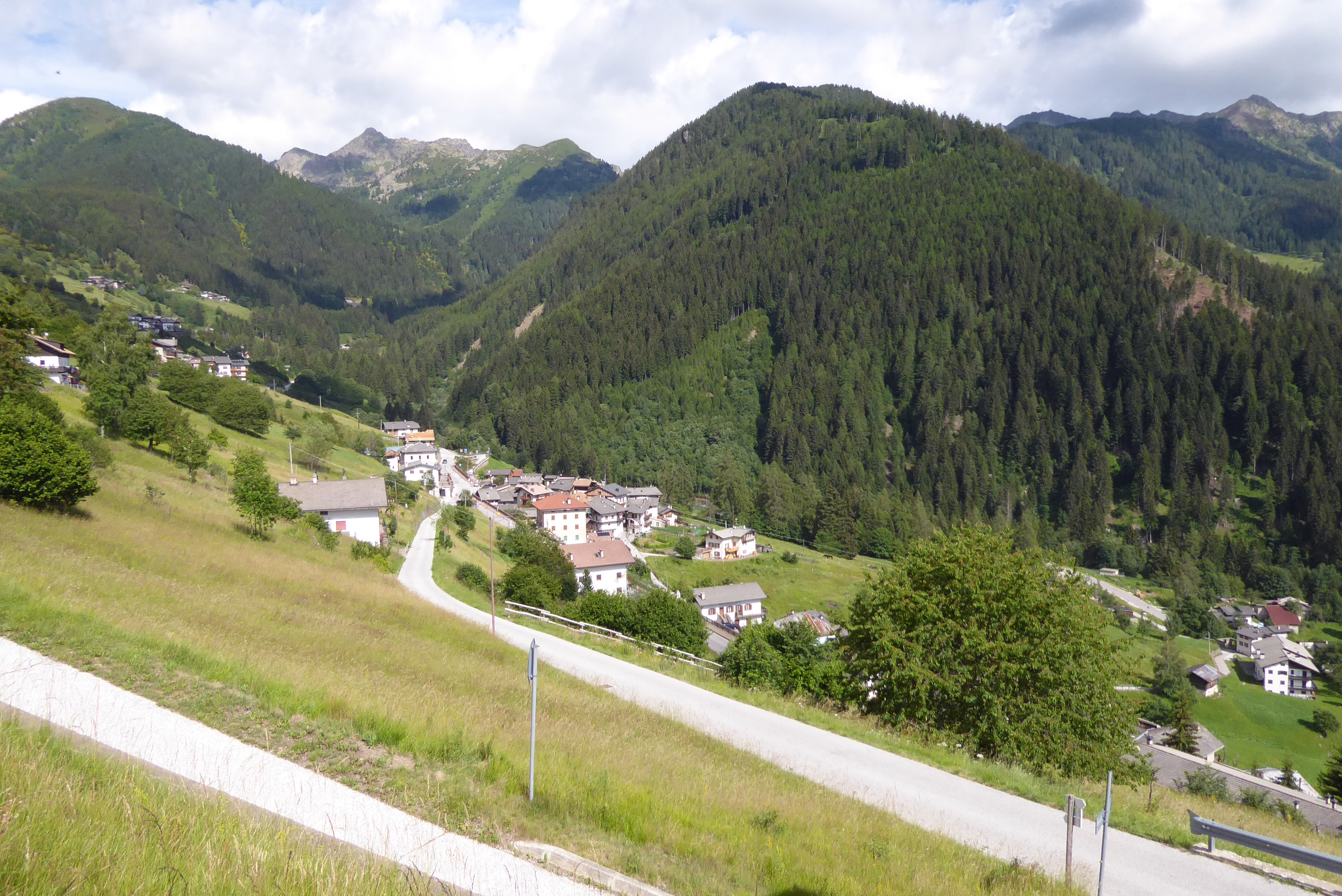

- Coat of arms

- Location within Trentino-Alto Adige/Südtirol Location within Italy
- Coordinates: 46°8′N 11°21′E
- Country: Italy
- Region: Trentino-Alto Adige/Südtirol
- Province: Trentino (TN)

Government
  - Mayor: Franco Moar

Area
  - Total: 16.7 km^{2} (6.4 sq mi)

Population (Dec. 2004)
  - Total: 183
  - Density: 11.0/km^{2} (28.4/sq mi)
- Time zone: UTC+1 (CET)
  - Summer (DST): UTC+2 (CEST)
- Postal code: 38050
- Dialing code: 0461
- Website: Official website

Palù del Fersina (Mocheno: Palai/Palae en Bersntol, German: Palai im Fersental) is a comune (municipality) in Trentino in the northern Italian region Trentino-Alto Adige/Südtirol, located about 20 kilometres (12 mi) northeast of Trento. As of 31 December 2004, it had a population of 183 and an area of 16.7 square kilometres (6.4 mi^{2}).

Palù del Fersina borders the following municipalities: Bedollo, Telve, Baselga di Pinè, Telve di Sopra, Sant'Orsola Terme, Fierozzo and Torcegno.

In the census of 2001, 184 inhabitants out of 195 (94.4%) declared themselves members of the Mócheno linguistic group.

== Demographic evolution ==
Historical population

Year	Pop.	±%
1861	?	—
1871	?	—
1881	?	—
1901	?	—
1911	?	—

Year	Pop.	±%
1921	413	—
1931	360	−12.8%
1936	358	−0.6%
1951	340	−5.0%
1961	337	−0.9%

Year	Pop.	±%
1971	323	−4.2%
1981	287	−11.1%
1991	221	−23.0%
2001	195	−11.8%

Source: Data from ISTAT
