= Roncegno Terme =

- Comune
- Comune di Roncegno Terme
- Location within Italy Location within Trentino-Alto Adige/Südtirol
- Coordinates: 46°3′3″N 11°24′36″E
- Country: Italy
- Region: Trentino-Alto Adige/Südtirol
- Province: Trentino (TN)
- Frazioni: Marter, Monte di Mezzo, S. Brigida e 44 Masi

Government
  - Mayor: Corrado Giovannini

Area
  - Total: 38.08 km^{2} (14.70 sq mi)
- Elevation: 535 m (1,755 ft)

Population (31 December 2015)
  - Total: 2,879
  - Density: 75.60/km^{2} (195.8/sq mi)
- Demonym: Roncegnesi (Ronzegnari)
- Time zone: UTC+1 (CET)
  - Summer (DST): UTC+2 (CEST)
- Postal code: 38050
- Dialing code: 0461
- Patron saint: Saint Peter and Saint Paul
- Saint day: 29 June
- Website: Official website

Roncegno Terme (Ronzégno in local dialect) is a comune (municipality) in Trentino in the northern Italian region Trentino-Alto Adige/Südtirol, located about 20 kilometres (12 mi) east of Trento.
