= Brocon Pass =

Mountain pass in Trentino, Italy

- Location within Alps
- Elevation: 1,616 m (5,302 ft)

Location
- Location: Trentino, Italy
- Range: Dolomites
- Coordinates: 46°7′7″N 11°41′18″E

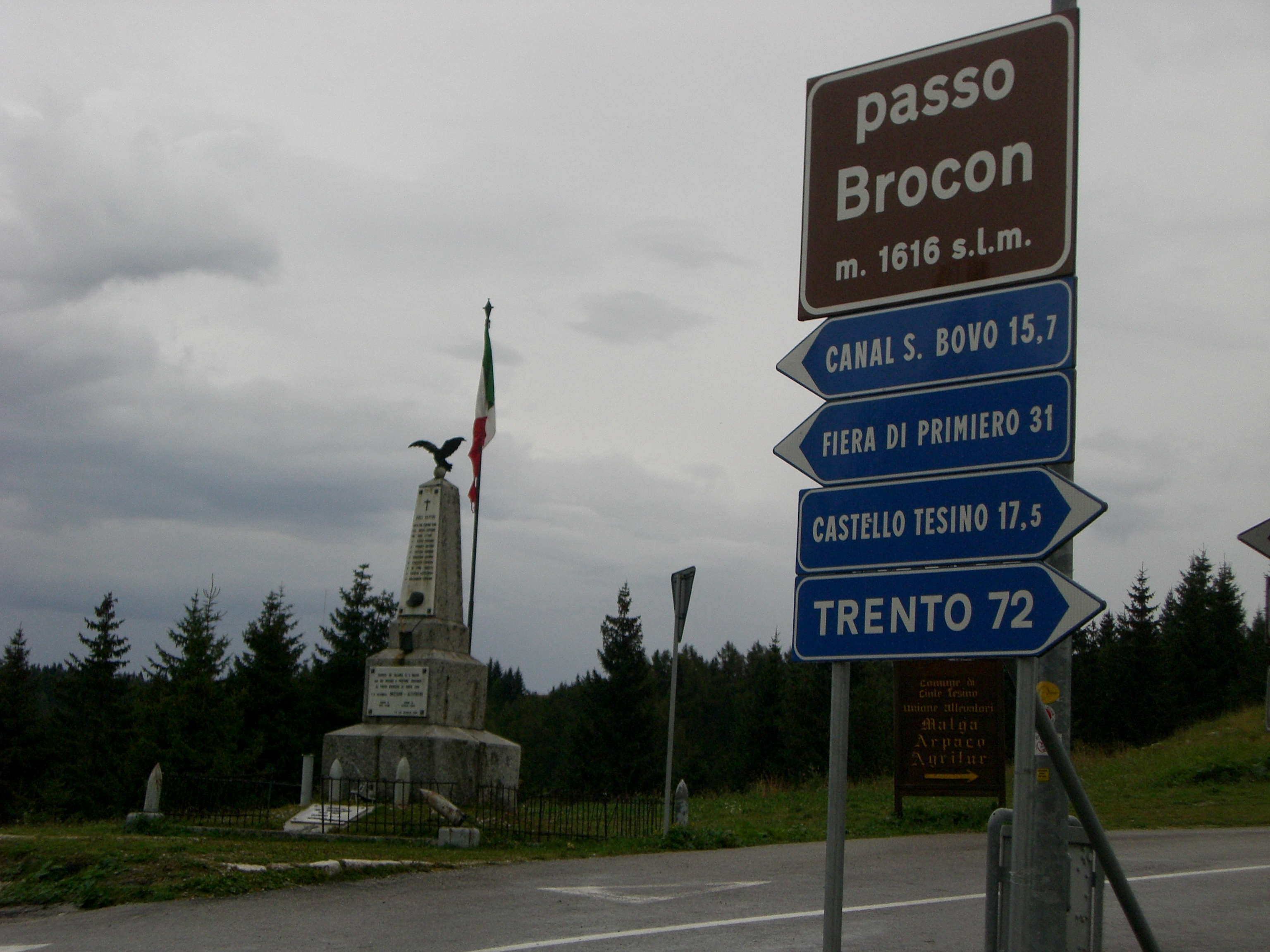

The Brocon Pass (Italian: Passo Brocon) (1616 m) is a high mountain pass in the Dolomites in the eastern part of Trentino in Italy. The pass takes its name, ‘Brocon’, from the local dialects of Trentino and Veneto in northern Italy, in which the term refers to heather. The approach road from the south actually reaches 1663 metres altitude, before gently descending to the col itself.

It connects the Vanoi valley with the Tesino plateau, linking Castello Tesino and Canal San Bovo.

The pass road was built between 1905 and 1908.

== See also ==
- List of highest paved roads in Europe
- List of mountain passes
