= Cinte Tesino =

- Comune
- Comune di Cinte Tesino
- Location within Italy Location within Trentino-Alto Adige/Südtirol
- Coordinates: 46°3′N 11°37′E
- Country: Italy
- Region: Trentino-Alto Adige/Südtirol
- Province: Trentino (TN)

Government
  - Mayor: Leonardo Ceccato

Area
  - Total: 25.9 km^{2} (10.0 sq mi)

Population (2026)
  - Total: 352
  - Density: 13.6/km^{2} (35.2/sq mi)
- Time zone: UTC+1 (CET)
  - Summer (DST): UTC+2 (CEST)
- Postal code: 38050
- Dialing code: 0461
- Website: Official website

Cinte Tesino (Sinte, Zinte, Thinte or Finte in local dialect) is a comune (municipality) in Trentino in the northern Italian region Trentino-Alto Adige/Südtirol, located about 40 kilometres (25 mi) east of Trento. As of 31 December 2004, it had a population of 392 and an area of 25.9 square kilometres (10.0 mi^{2}).

Cinte Tesino borders the following municipalities: Canal San Bovo, Pieve Tesino, Castello Tesino, Scurelle, Lamon, Ospedaletto, and Grigno.

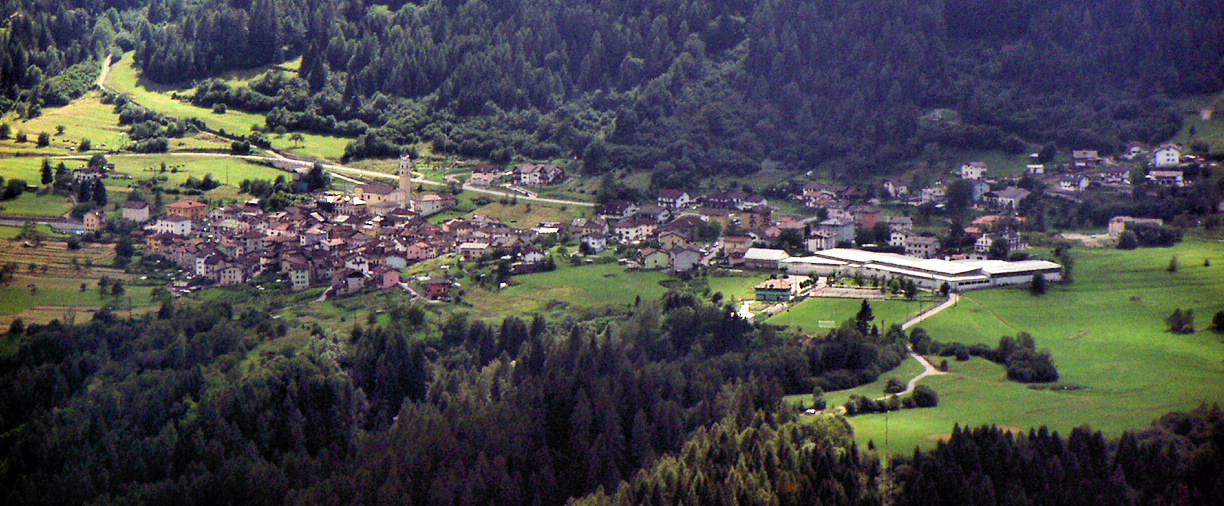
Cinte Tesino in spring

== Demographic evolution ==
Historical population

Year	Pop.	±%
1861	?	—
1871	?	—
1881	?	—
1901	?	—
1911	?	—

Year	Pop.	±%
1921	922	—
1931	860	−6.7%
1936	771	−10.3%
1951	763	−1.0%
1961	748	−2.0%

Year	Pop.	±%
1971	614	−17.9%
1981	508	−17.3%
1991	451	−11.2%
2001	406	−10.0%

Source: Data from ISTAT
