= Lamon =

- Comune
- Comune di Lamon
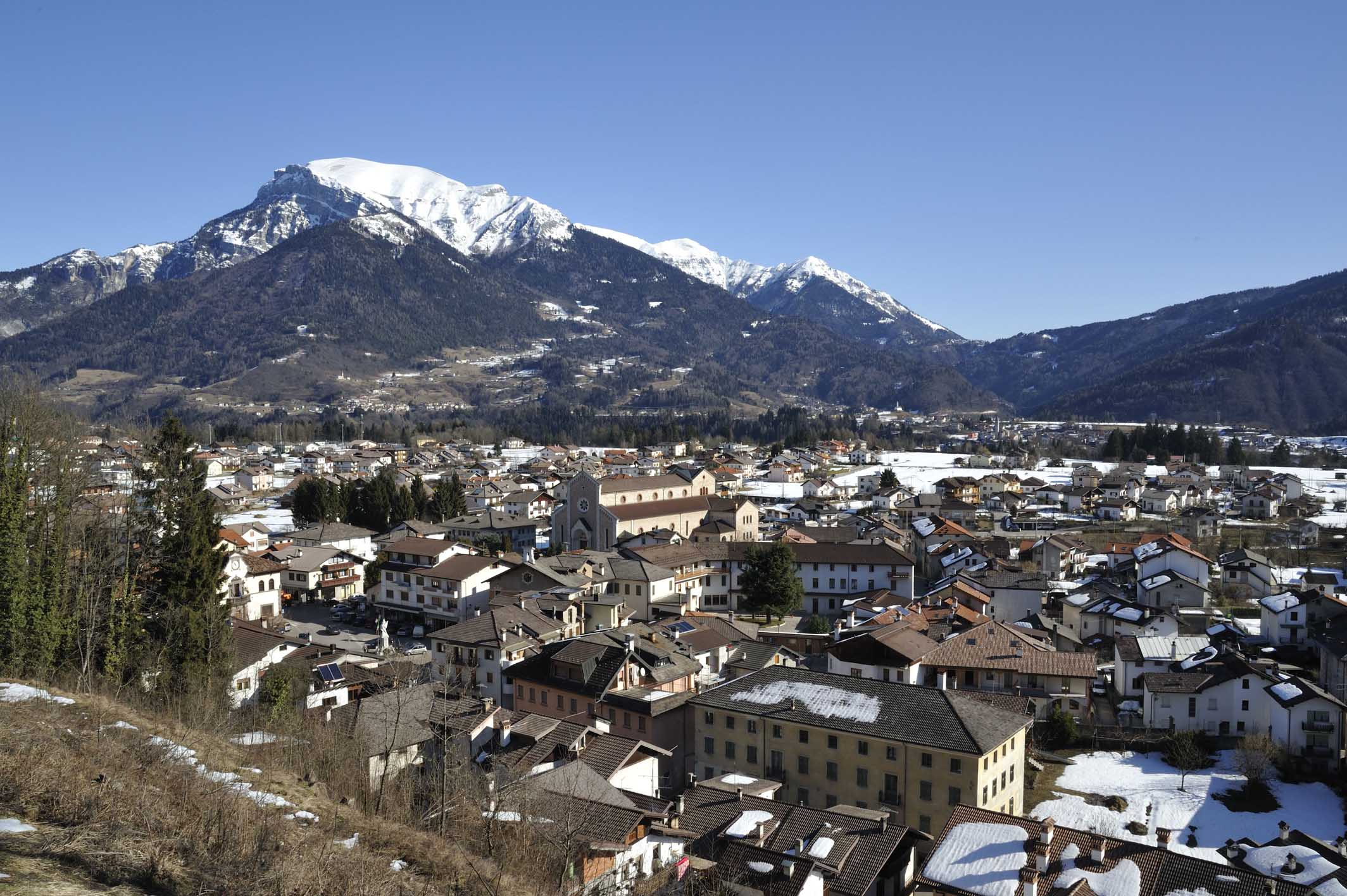

- Location within Italy Location within Veneto
- Coordinates: 46°02′50″N 11°44′56″E
- Country: Italy
- Region: Veneto
- Province: Province of Belluno (BL)
- Frazioni: Arina, Bellotti, Cess, Chioè, Oltra, Piei, Pian del vescovo, Rugna, Ronche, San Donato, Sala, Zavena

Area
  - Total: 54.3 km^{2} (21.0 sq mi)
- Elevation: 594 m (1,949 ft)

Population (Dec. 2004)
  - Total: 3,322
  - Density: 61.2/km^{2} (158/sq mi)
- Demonym: Lamonesi
- Time zone: UTC+1 (CET)
  - Summer (DST): UTC+2 (CEST)
- Postal code: 32033
- Dialing code: 0439
- Website: Official website

Lamon is a comune (municipality) in the province of Belluno in the Italian region of Veneto, located about 80 kilometres (50 mi) northwest of Venice and about 35 kilometres (22 mi) west of Belluno. As of 31 December 2004, it had a population of 3,322 and an area of 54.3 square kilometres (21.0 mi^{2}).

The municipality of Lamon contains the frazioni (subdivisions, mainly villages and hamlets) Arina, Bellotti, Cess, Chioè, Oltra, Piei, Pian del vescovo, Rugna, Ronche, San Donato, Sala, and Zavena.

Lamon borders the following municipalities: Arsiè, Canal San Bovo, Castello Tesino, Cinte Tesino, Fonzaso, Sovramonte.

== Geography ==
The territory of Lamon is located between two long valleys, with the Cismon tributary to the east and the Senaiga tributary to the south, which flows into the Cismon tributary leading to the Lago di Senaiga. The municipality borders the municipalities of Belluno of Arsiè, Fonzaso and Sovramonte and the Trentino municipalities of Canal San Bovo, Castello Tesino and Cinte Tesino. The large territory of the municipality, which extends for over 54 km^{2}, is divided into three hamlets corresponding to the historic communities of Lamon, San Donato and Arina.

The territory of Lamon starts at 360m asl in the Maoli hamlet and culminates at the Monte Coppolo, 2069m. The climate is alpine, with cold and dry winters and moderately hot summers with frequent breezes. The central plateau, which rises to about 600m asl, houses the capital and more than half of the entire municipal population.

At a first geographical analysis, the vast and mountainous Lamonese territory presents the particular characteristics of a marked asperity and discontinuity between the various low, medium and high mountain areas. With the exception of the plateau and other small flat alluvial terraces, the morphology of the soil is alternated by steep slopes, grandiose ridges, sunny ridges and rocky buttresses that slope down between narrow valleys of wild and rare beauty.

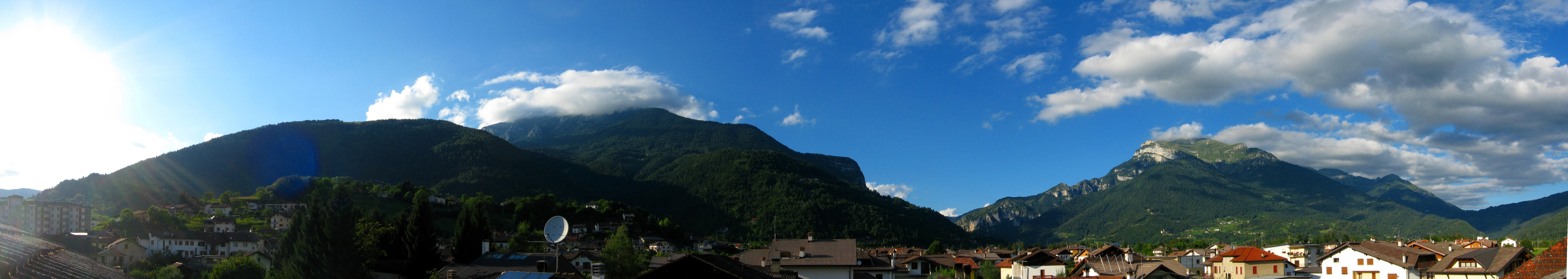

== Origins of the name ==
In the seventeenth century, a derivative exegesis of Castrum Ammonis was given, in reference to an alleged (and never proven) cult of Giove Ammone (Jupiter) on the hill of San Pietro.

In fact, the toponym Lamon could refer to the proto-Italian lama, attributable to the Etruscan lumena and the Latin lima ("pond", but also "landslide"). Evidence of this comes from the geological formation of the vast plateaus of Lamon and Sovramonte formed by the gradual filling of a large lake formed at the end of the last glacial period, about 15,000 years ago.

== History ==
=== Pre-history and ancient era ===
The Lamon plateau shows traces of frequentation since prehistoric times, as evidenced by the discovery of numerous objects in stone and flint. Among other things, the remarkable discovery of a prehistoric hunter occurred in 1988 in Val Rosna, on the supramontine side of the Cismon. More recently, remains of fauna fossils were found in the cave of San Donato, including the remains of the Ursus spelaeus, a large bear that was spread over the Alpine arc (today a skeleton, composed of bones of different specimens, is present in the atrium of the town hall). Research carried out by middle school students in the hamlet of Guana in 1997 uncovered arrowheads, scratchers, cores and sickle elements (flint blades) attributable to farmers who lived in the late Neolithic period (3000 BC).

In historical age, for the territory of Lamon, as the rest of Feltrino, the toponymic evidence confirms the news of Pliny the Elder, according to which the municipium of Feltria (and its territory which also included the Lamonese plateau) was inhabited by Rhaetian people, distinct from the Gallic people of nearby Bellunum. Also present were Etruscan populations who fled the territory of Felsina and the Etrurian plains between 450 and 350 BC. The latter, like the Reti, did not speak an Indo-European language, but instead included the Venetic language, Celtic dialects, Latin and Greek. The niches carved in the rock of the Colle di San Pietro, at the height of the cave now dedicated to the devotion to the Virgin Mary, are perhaps attributable to this period.

With the establishment of the municipium of Feltria, the Lamon plateau was affected by Romanization, especially following the preparation of the Via Claudia Augusta (today in the Lamonese tract called 'via pagana') which from Altinum reached Augusta Vindelicum (Augusta), in the province of Raetia. The road, traced by Drusus and "fitted" by Claudius, passed directly (or a branch of it, the question is still debated) through the Lamonese territory in the direction of Castello Tesino.

A settlement developed in the first centuries of the Christian era, where the hamlet of San Donato stands today, a geomorphologically suitable point for controlling the street. This is evidenced by the findings of the necropolis located downstream of today's hamlet, from which objects of burial tombs have been discovered. Recently the area has been the subject of investigations by the Superintendency which has highlighted several 2nd and 3rd century AD burials. The recovered objects are now kept in an exhibition in Lamon. Within these investigations, the wall structures at Col Furlan were also highlighted, perhaps related to the Castle of San Donato referred to in oral tradition. A second housing nucleus developed around the already popular San Pietro hill, on which it is believed that a tower was placed in order to be visually connected with other observation points located along the route of the road in the nearby Sovramonte plateau. Between the end of the nineteenth century and the beginning of the twentieth century various finds from the Roman era (tombs, jewels, coins) came to light on the hill and in the surrounding area. The belt of the control stations on the Roman road finished at the Castle of Valdeniga (whose ruins were still visible in the nineteenth century). These fortresses originated in the late ancient age and then developed in the early medieval and medieval ages.

In fact, in the late antiquity, the importance of the Via Claudia Augusta did not decrease. Both for the Empire and for the Germanic people, it was a path of great fruition in the 4th to 6th centuries AD. Proof of this is the Calice argenteo del Diacono Orso (silver chalice of the Deacon Bear, 6th century AD), by far one of the greatest finds of Christianity and the oldest in the Christian West. It was recovered in 1836 in a ravine near San Donato, in the Coronini area. The inscription, written in capital letters, quotes: DE DONIS DEI URSUS DIACONUS SANCTO PETRO ET SANCTO PAULO OPTULIT. It probably testifies to the birth of the diocese of Feltre in the fifth century AD. According to some, the object belonged to the deacon Ursus, who carried out a permanent and itinerant service; the chalice would have been kept in the cathedral of Feltre and hidden when the Lombards arrived. For others, however, a chalice of this invoice would have belonged to episcopal seats of much higher prestige, Concordia or Aquileia, and would have been subject to raiding and therefore hidden along the route of the Via Claudia Augusta. Whatever the truth, what seems certain is that the object was voluntarily hidden, thus it was recovered intact. In this period, between the Late Antiquity and the Early Middle Ages, the plateau and its surroundings were affected by the allocation of people of Germanic origin. Several place names, including the Campigoti (literally, lands of the Goths) are proof of this. The agricultural exploitation of some localities located on the edge of the road layout is to be ascribed to this time, as in the case of the hamlets of Rugna and Ronche (from the late Latin runcare: to till the soil, deforest).

== Introduction of bean cultivation ==
The cultivation of the well-known Lamon bean began in 1528-1532. It was initiated by the Belluno abbot Pietro Valeriano. He had used the seeds given to him by Pope Clement VII. Beans have been the staple and popular food for Lamonese cuisine for centuries. Due to its richness in proteins, it has been called the meat of the poor.

The Lamonese bean has "a very thin rind and a tender pulp", which makes it sought after by gourmets.

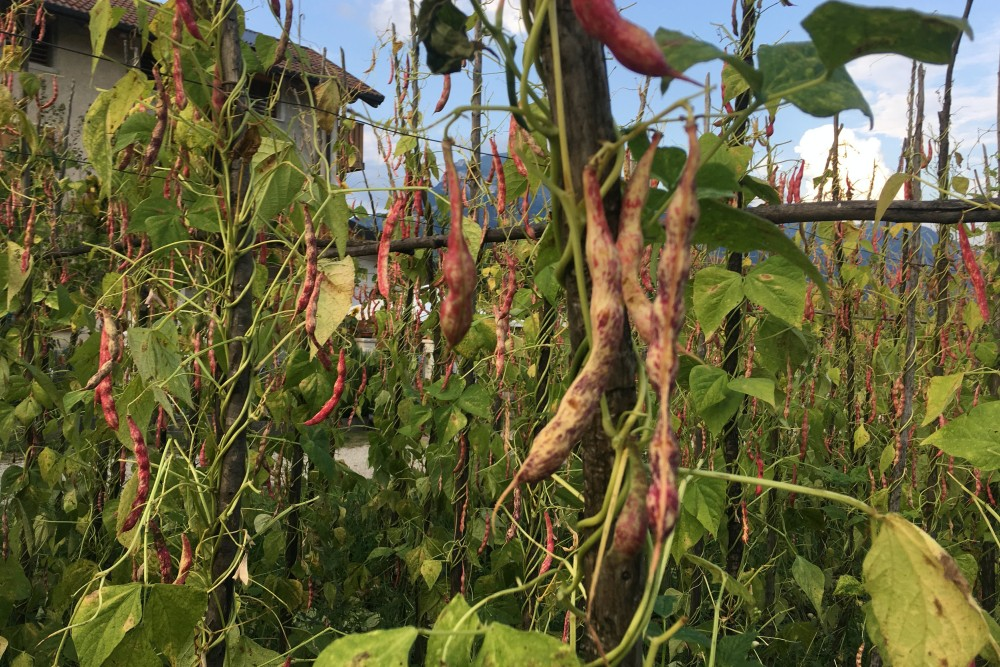

== Demographic evolution ==
Historical population
Year	Pop.	±%
1871	6,153	—
1881	4,356	−29.2%
1901	7,071	+62.3%
1911	6,785	−4.0%
1921	7,678	+13.2%
1931	7,321	−4.6%
1936	6,840	−6.6%
1951	7,413	+8.4%
1961	6,530	−11.9%
1971	4,214	−35.5%
1981	4,120	−2.2%
1991	3,743	−9.2%
2001	3,412	−8.8%
Source: ISTAT

== Image Gallery ==
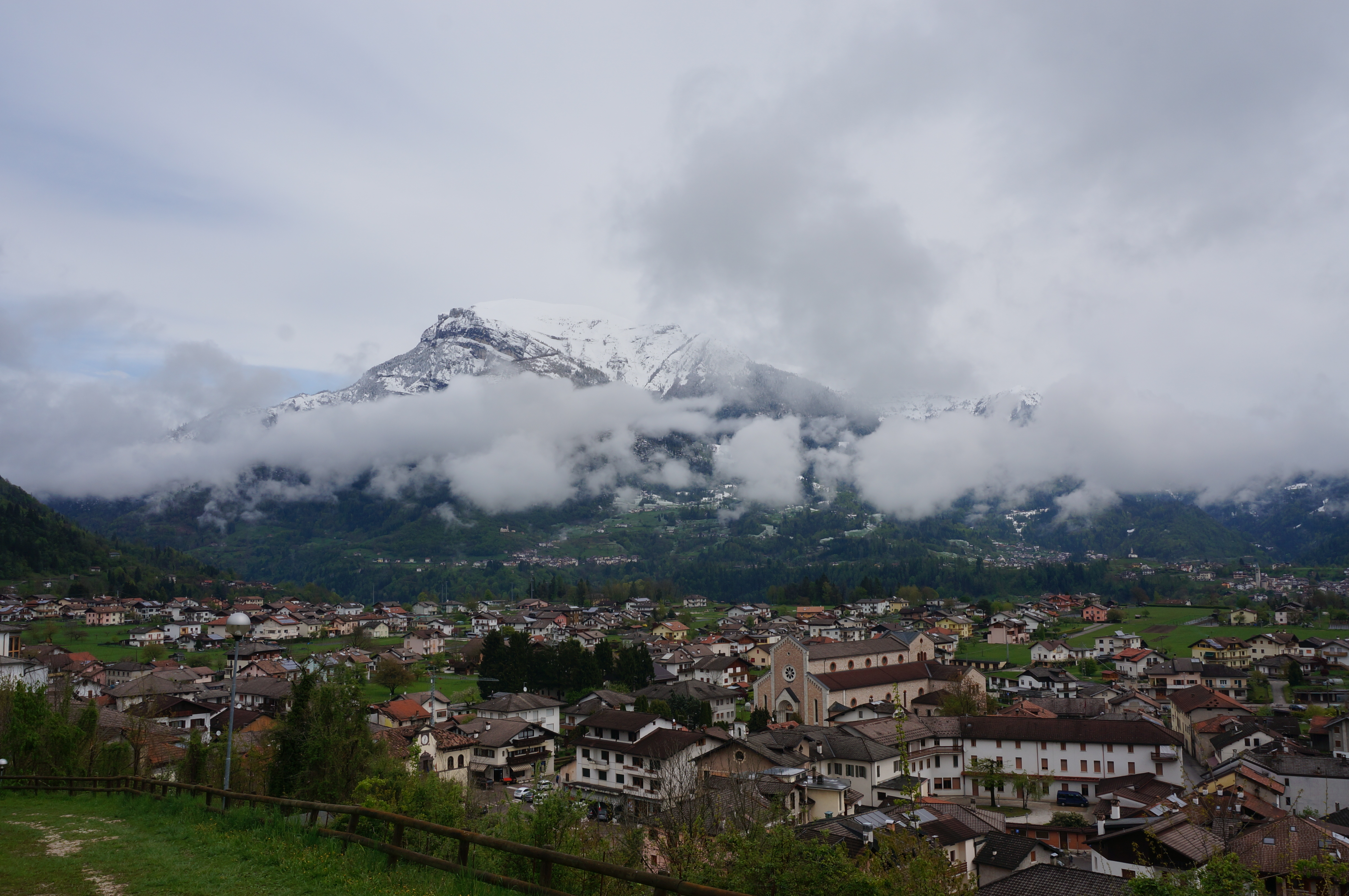
Lamon in May

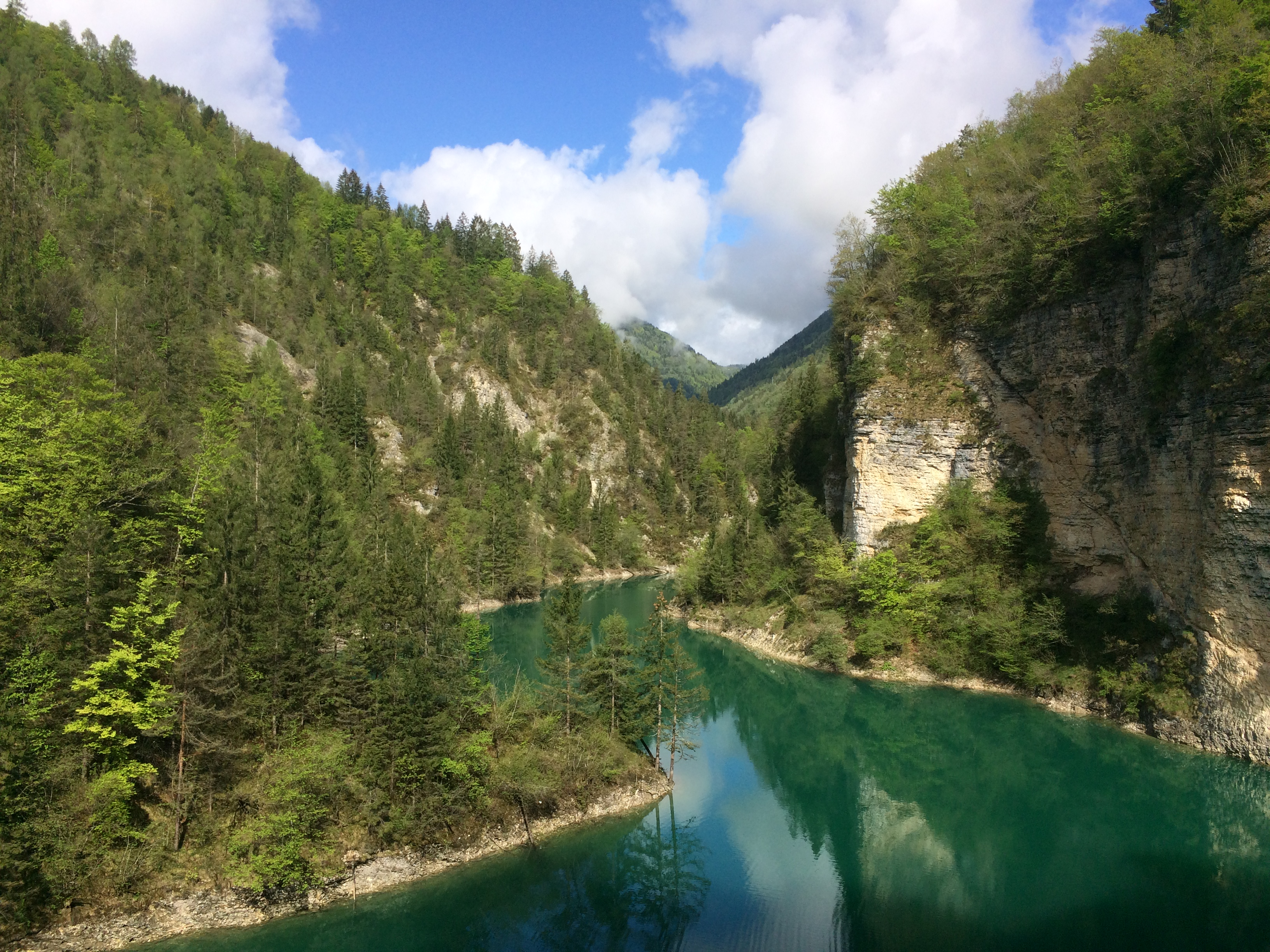
Lake Senaiga

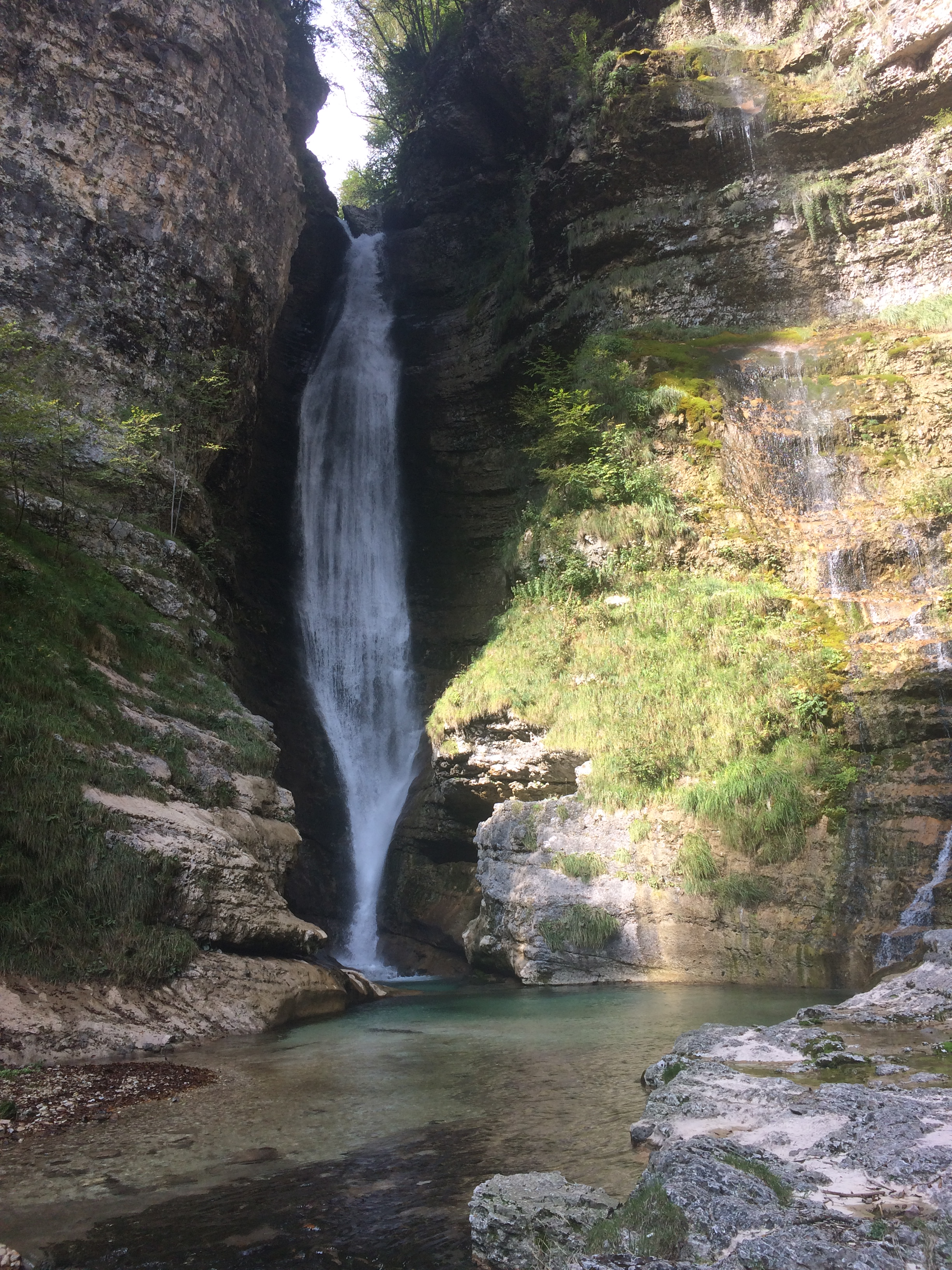
Cascata del Salton

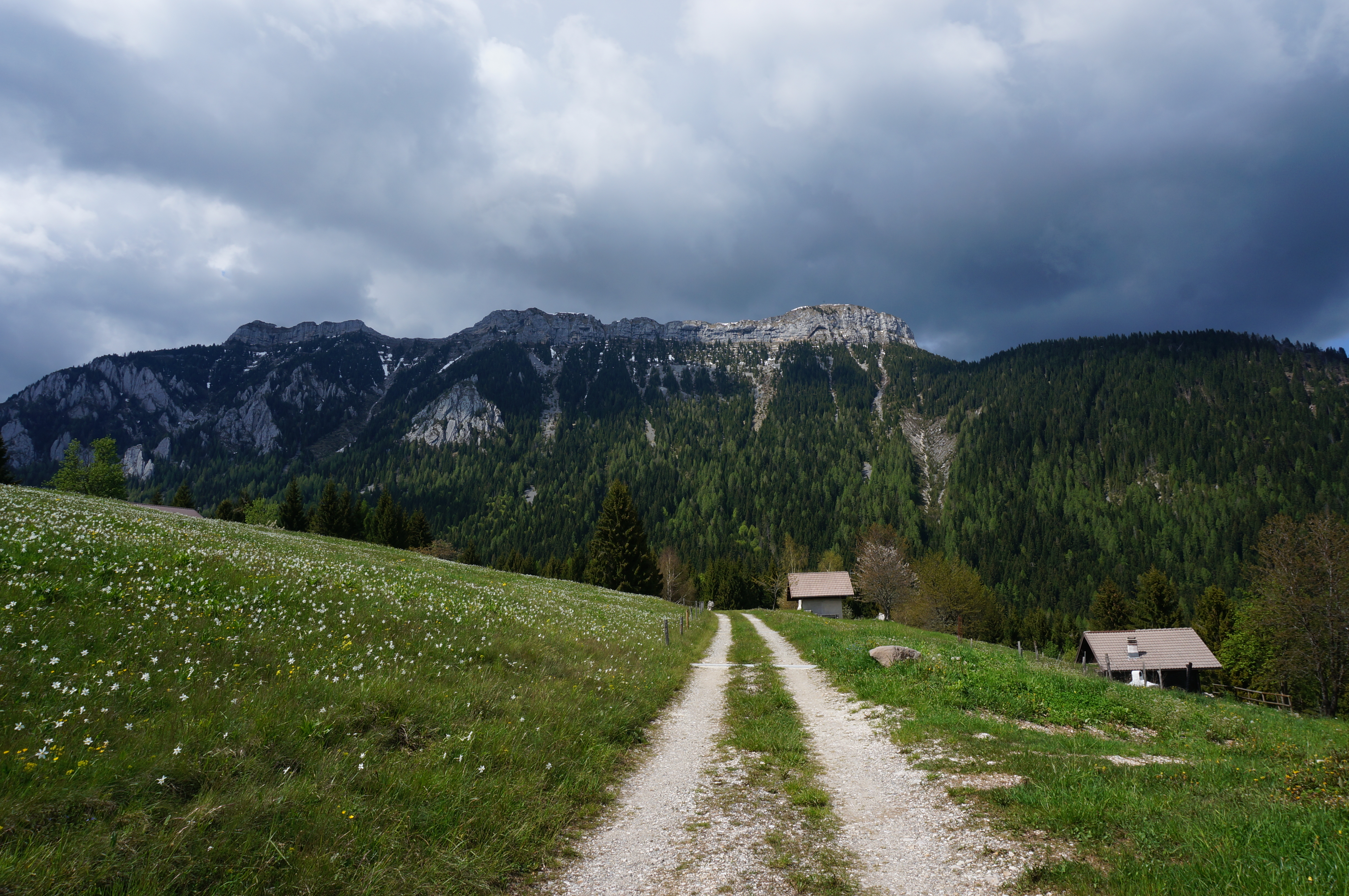
Mountain Coppolo

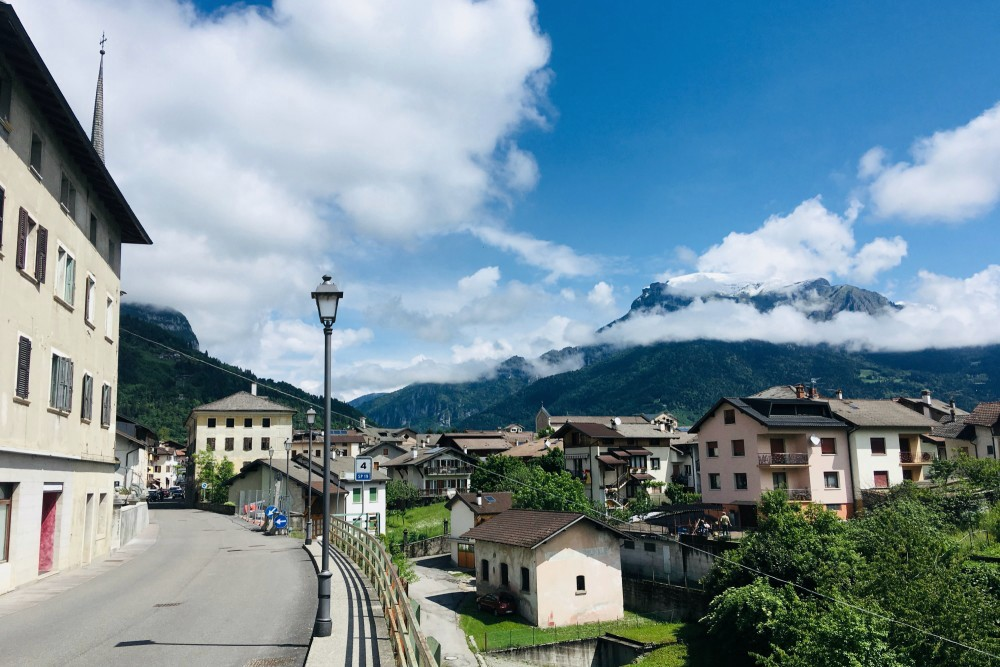
Via Roma. View on Mount Vallazza

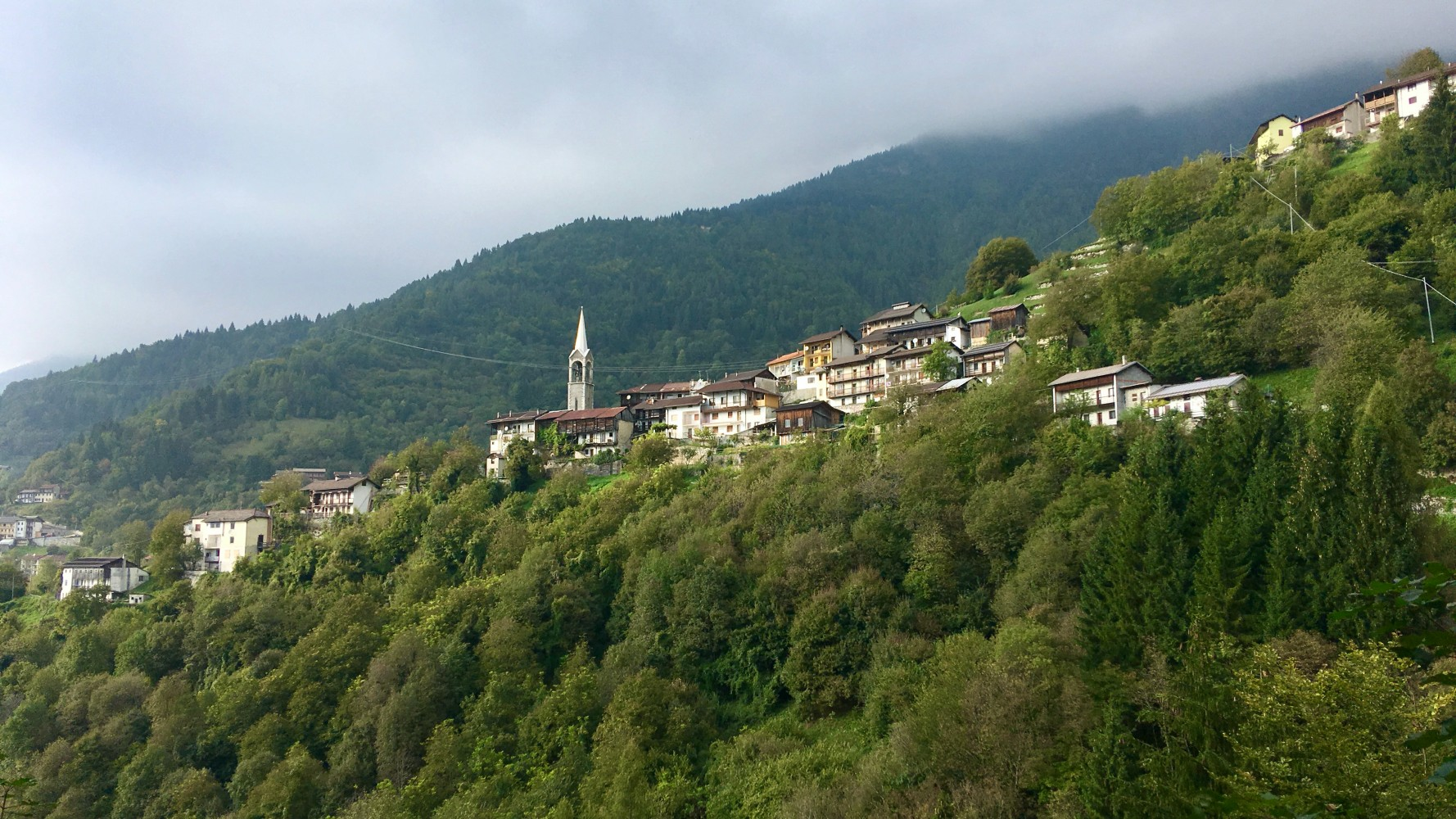
San Donato — frazione di Lamon

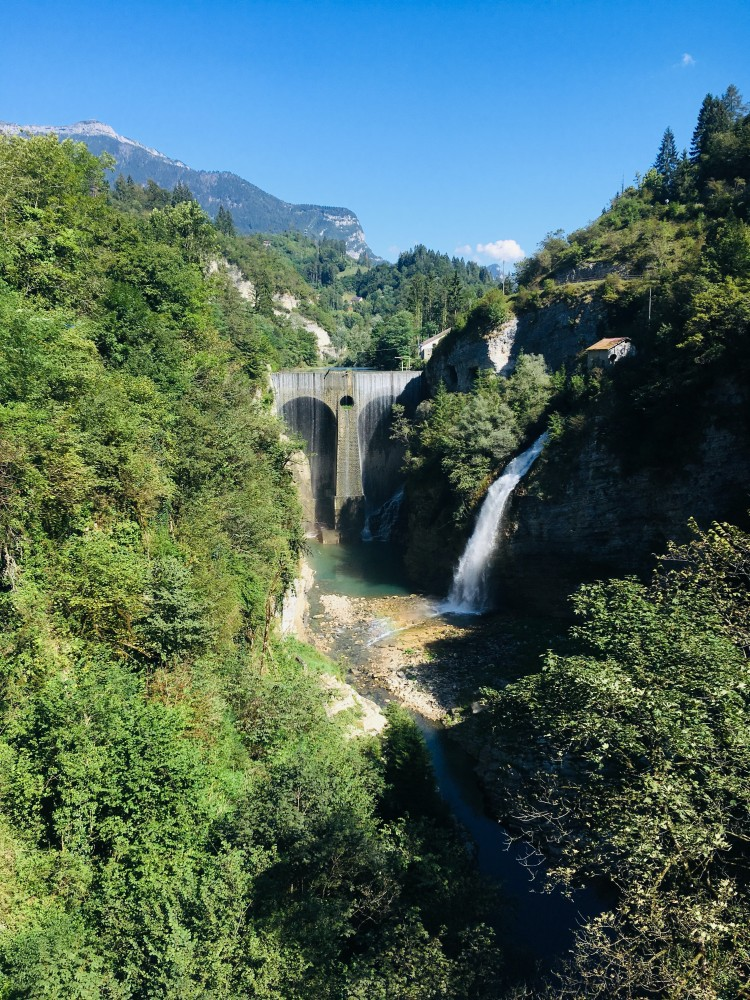
Ponte Sera in Lamon

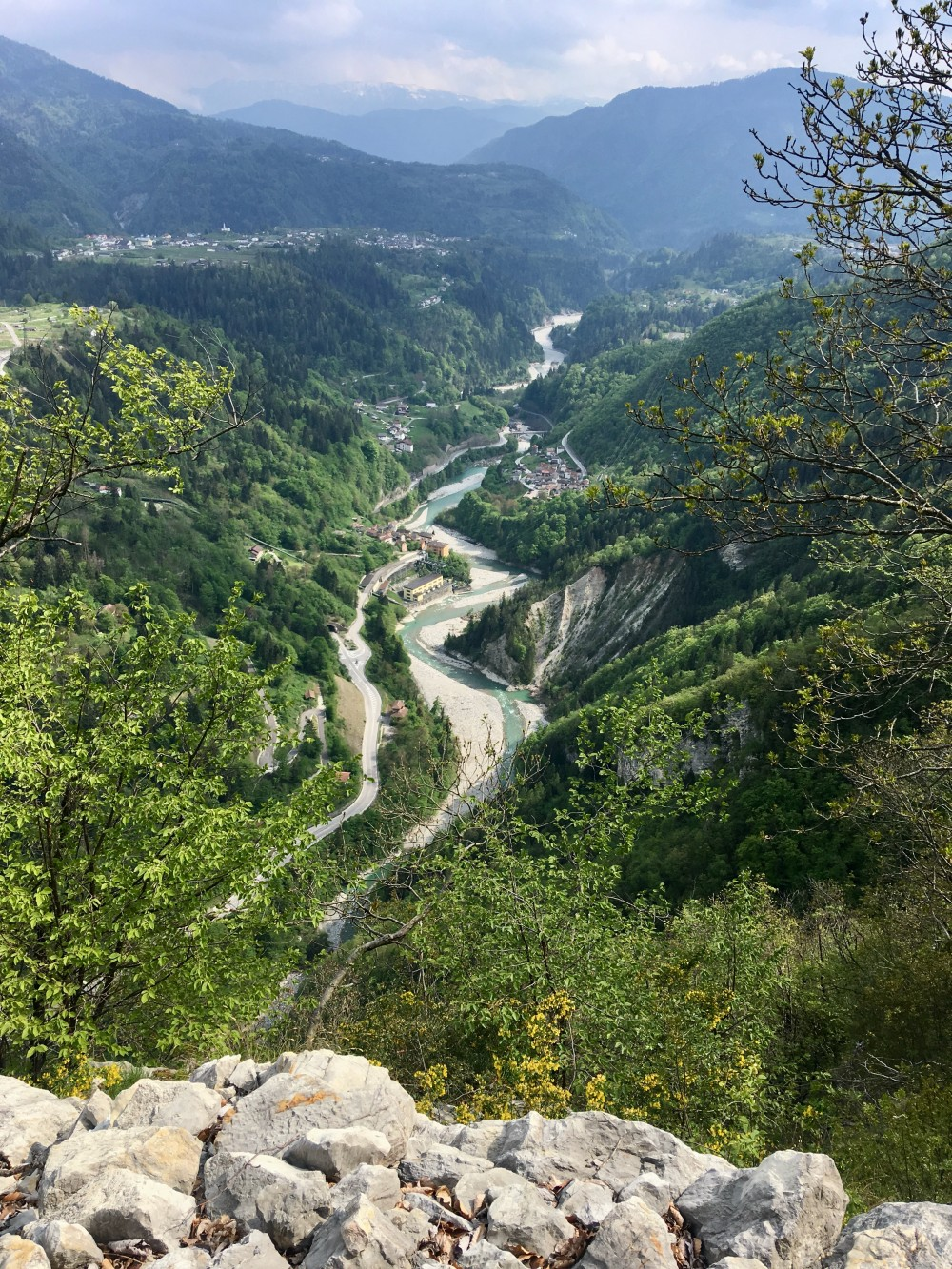
Torrent Cismon. View from Lamon

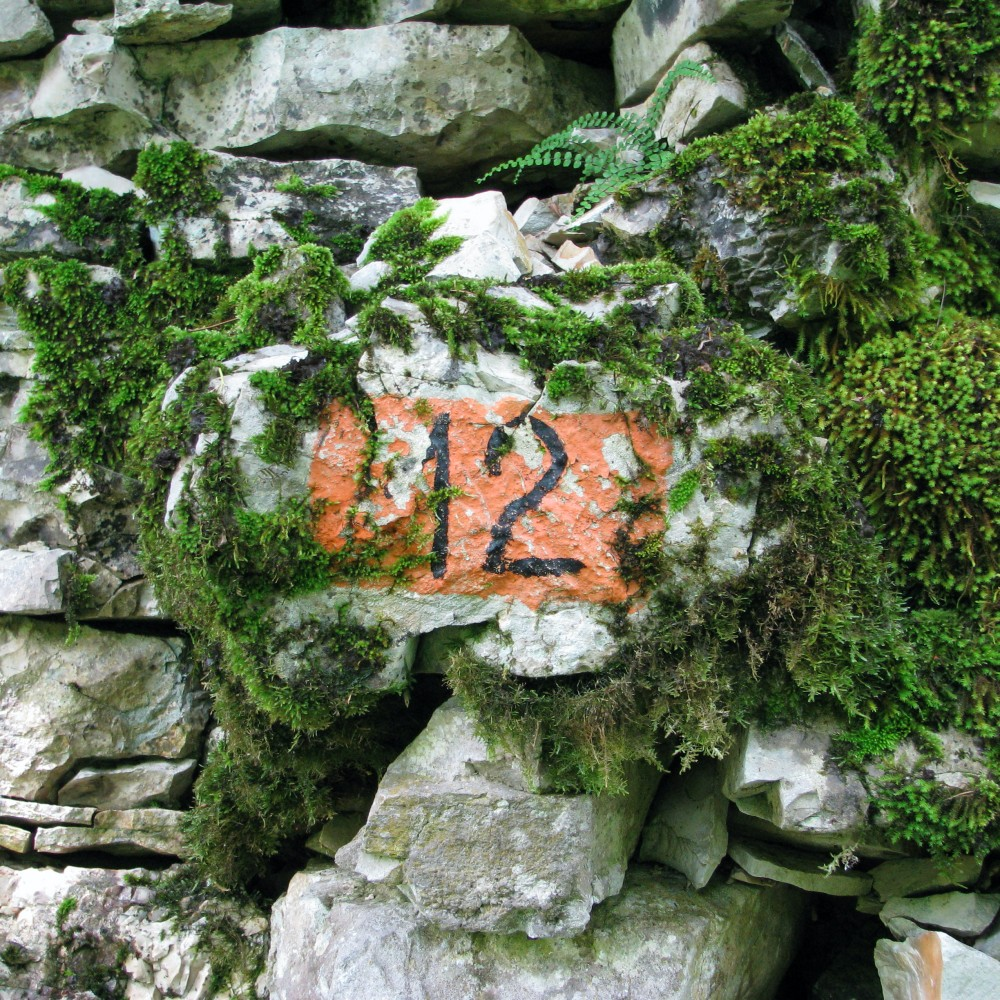
The trail 12 in Arina, frazione di Lamon

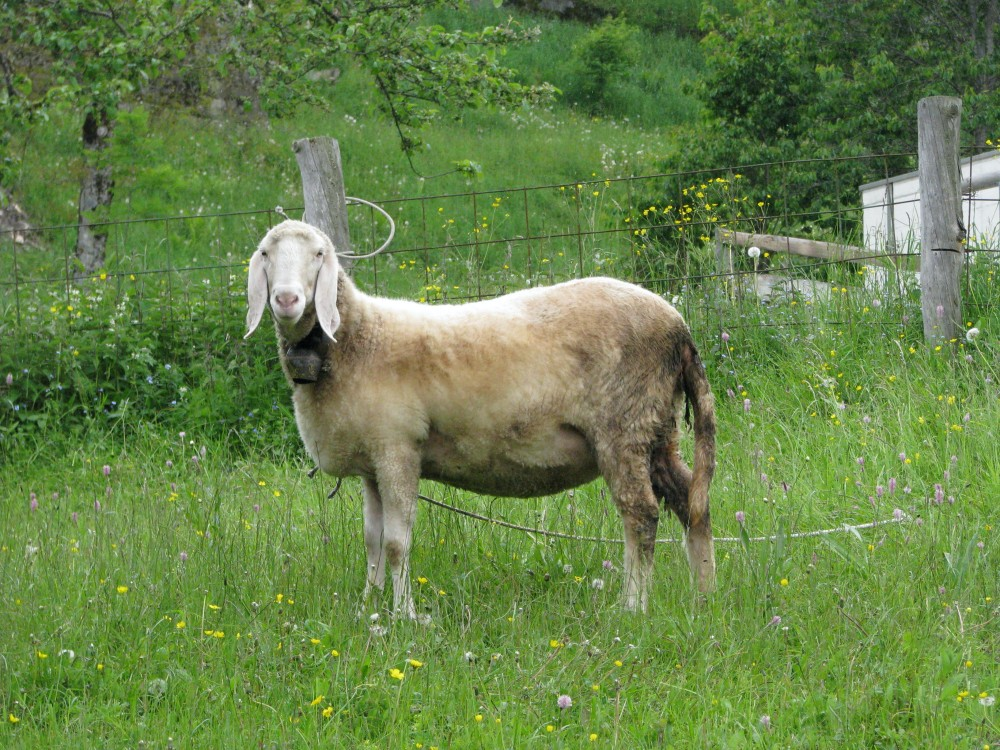
Sheep of Lamon

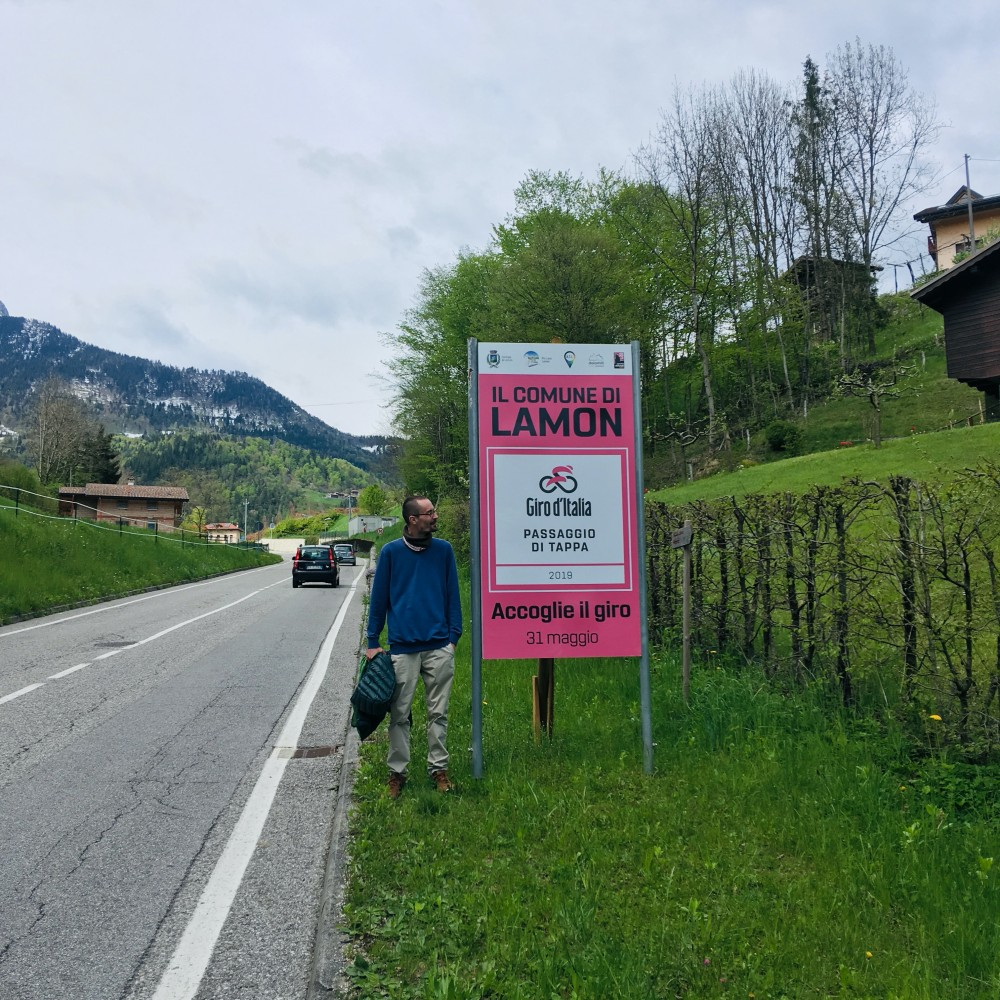
Lamon — stage 19 of Giro d'Italia 2019

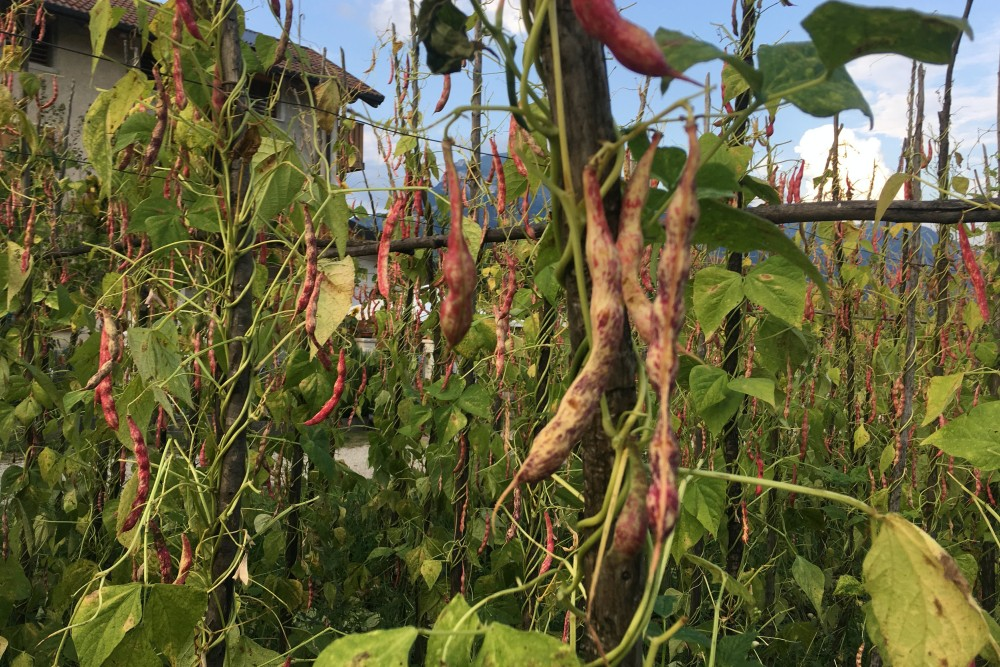
Fagiolo di Lamon in the garden

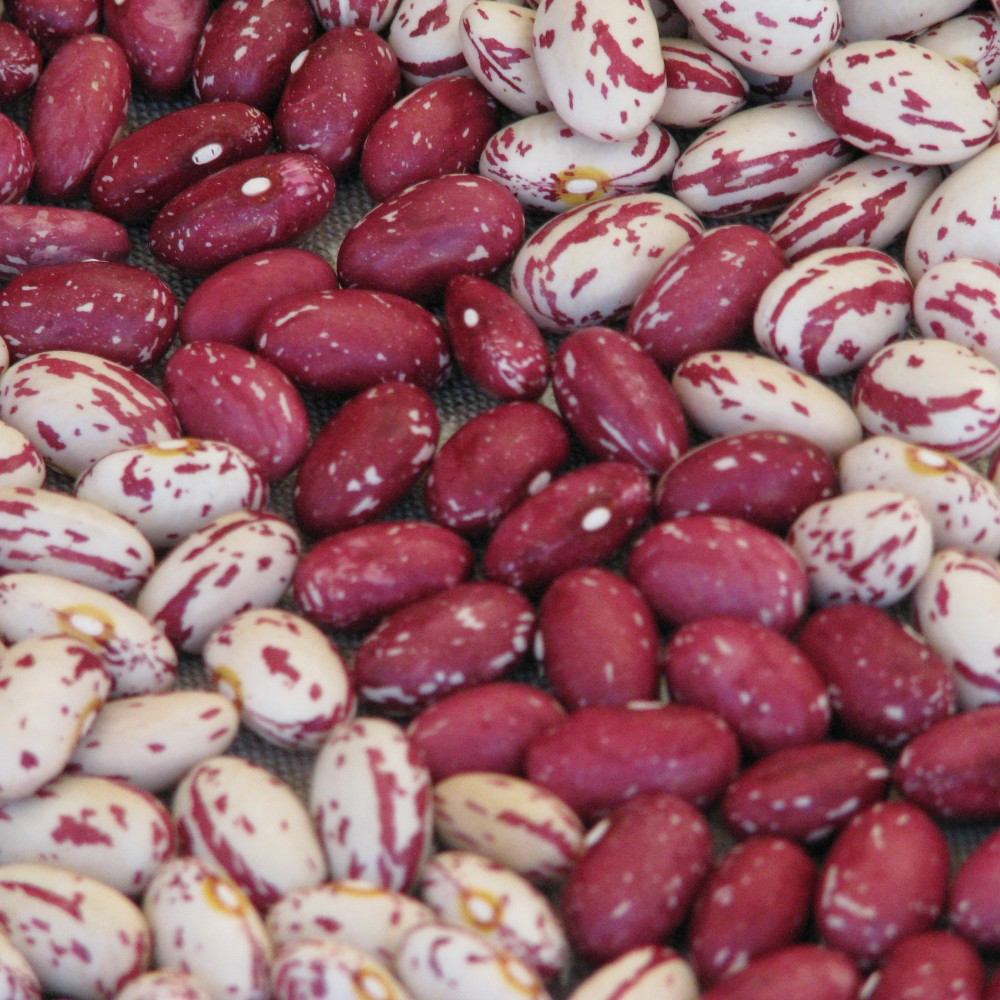
Fagiolo di Lamon

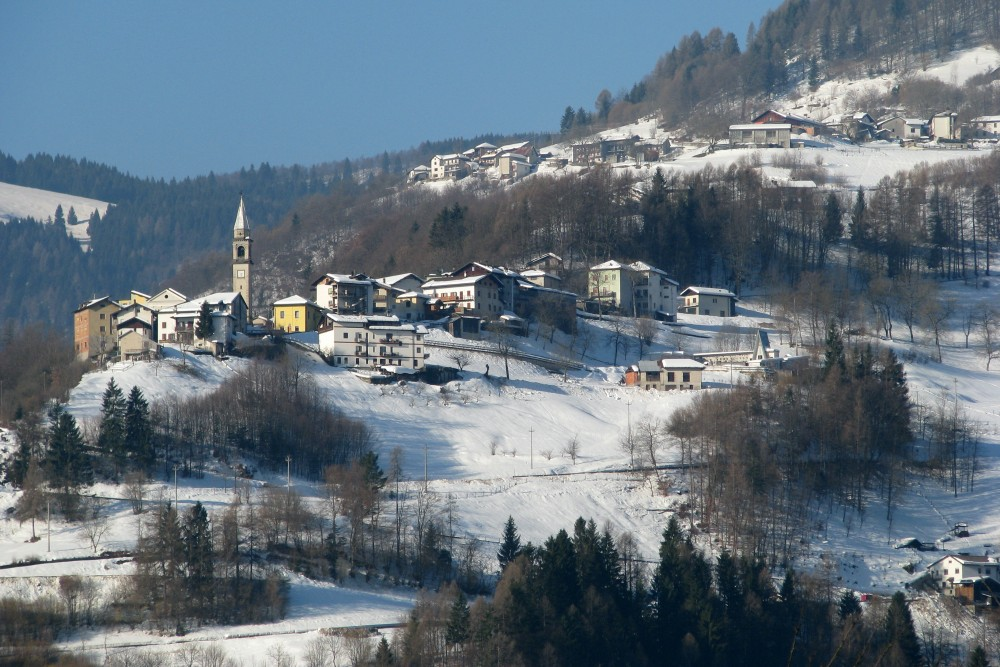
Arina — frazione di Lamon

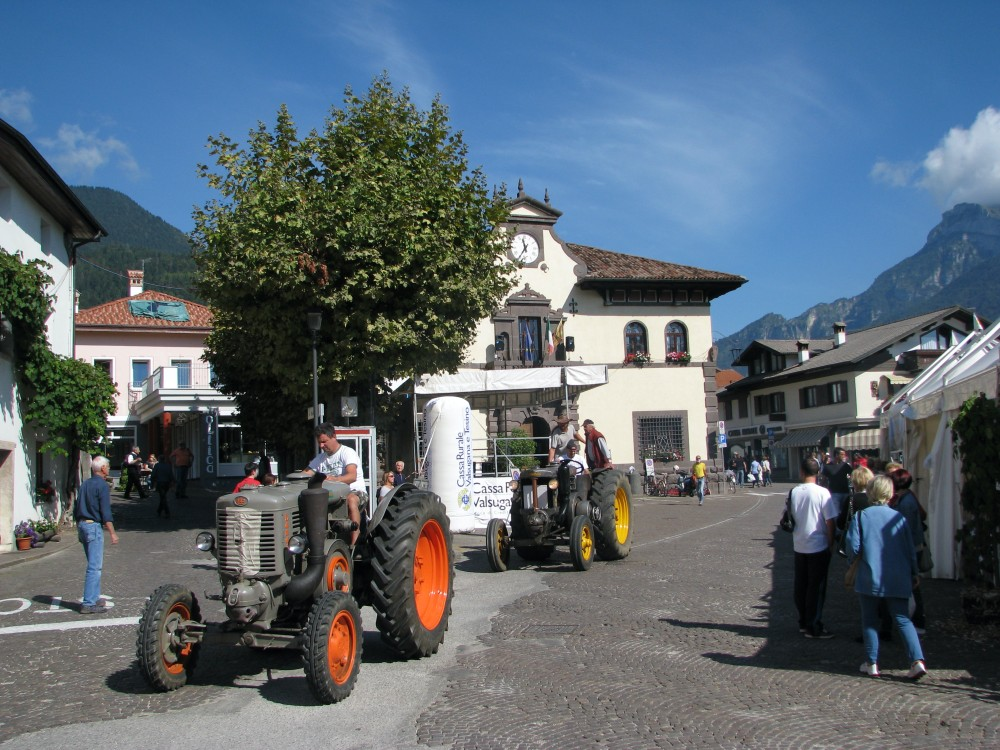
Festa del fagiolo 2013

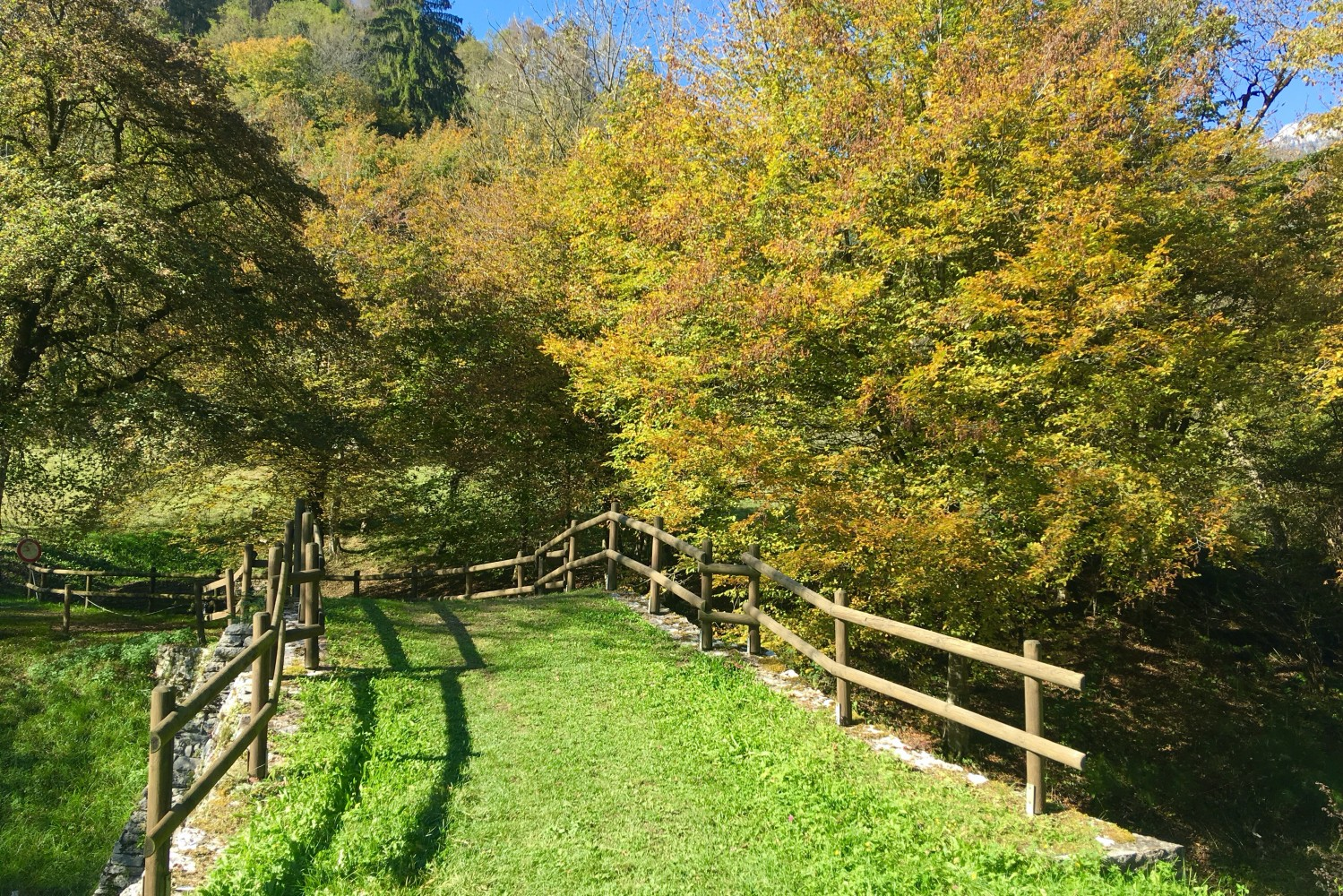
Ponte Romano on the Via Claudia Augusta
