= Sovramonte =

Sovramonte Comune di Sovramonte
- Scattered mountain municipality
- Comune di Sovramonte
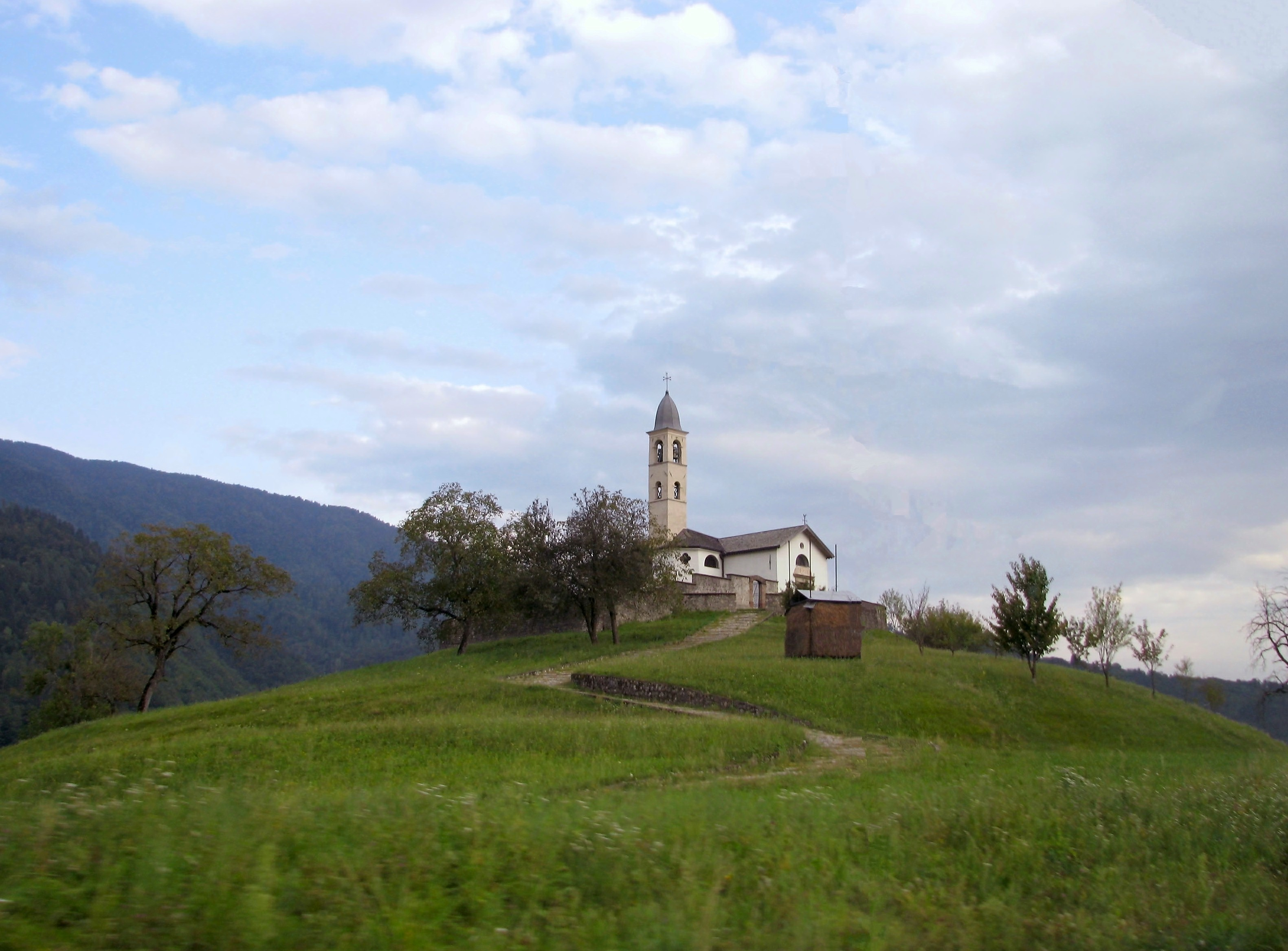
- Chiesa di San Giorgio (Sorriva)
- Nickname: Budini (Servo)
- Location within Italy Location within Veneto
- Coordinates: 46°4′N 11°47′E
- Country: Italy
- Region: Veneto
- Province: Province of Belluno (BL)
- Name adopted: Jan 1. 1882
- Frazioni: Sorriva, Zorzoi, Servo, Faller, Aune, Salzen, Croce d’Aune, Moline, Gorna, Col dei Mich.

Government
  - Mayor: Federico Dalla Torre (Ind.)

Area
  - Total: 50.8 km^{2} (19.6 sq mi)
- Elevation: 600 m (2,000 ft)
- Highest elevation: 2,334 m (7,657 ft)
- Lowest elevation: 346 m (1,135 ft)

Population (Jan 1. 2026)
  - Total: 1,287
  - Density: 25.3/km^{2} (65.6/sq mi)
- Demonym: Sovramontini
- Time zone: UTC+1 (CET)
  - Summer (DST): UTC+2 (CEST)
- Postal code: 32030
- Dialing code: 0439
- ISTAT code: 025058
- Patron saint: St. Zeno
- Saint day: April 12th
- Website: https://comune.sovramonte.bl.it/ https://www.dolomitipark.it/

A panorama of Servo

Sovramonte is a comune (municipality) in the province of Belluno in the Italian region of Veneto, located about 120 kilometres (75 mi) northwest of Venice and about 35 kilometres (22 mi) west of Belluno. It lies on the region's border with Trentino Alto Adige and overlooks the Cismon river and Lamon. As of January 1st 2026, it had a population of 1,287 and an area of 50.8 square kilometres (19.6 mi^{2}).

The municipality of Sovramonte contains the frazioni (subdivisions, mainly villages and hamlets) Sorriva, Zorzoi, Servo, Faller, Aune, Salzen, Croce d’Aune, Moline, Col dei Mich and Gorna. The most populous of the frazioni is Sorriva.

Sovramonte borders the following municipalities: Canal San Bovo, Feltre, Fonzaso, Imer, Lamon, Mezzano, Pedavena.

== History ==
Sovramonte was called Servo until 1881, a name still kept by its administrative hamlet.

==== Cacciatore della Val Rosna ====
A major archaeological discovery was made by Aldo Villabruna when he spotted a rock shelter site in Sovramonte, 1987 during road and construction work on the banks of the Cismon river. The following year, 1988, archaeologist Alberto Broglio and a team from the University of Ferrara and the Gruppo Amici del Museo di Belluno successfully excavated the skeletal remains. His remains are dated to be from approximately 14,000 years ago during the Upper Paleolithic era. Biomechanical studies published in the National Library of Medicine note that he had heightened overall robusticity and humeral asymmetry, suggesting intense unimanual activity which is linked to repeated movements in hunting. This research has led many to come to the conclusion that the individual was likely a hunter-gatherer. The man's remains have been studied at the University of Ferrara, while artefacts and exhibits are featured at local museums including the Museo dell'Uomo della Val Rosna - Muvar. The Uomo della Val Rosna's burial site has included discoveries such as painted stones and the earliest known evidence of dentistry.

==== Via Claudia Augusta ====
Sovramonte is crossed by the Claudia Augusta Altinate, a branch of the Via Claudia Augusta. The Claudia Augusta was built with the aim of opening a route to Germany through Austria. The Via Claudia Augusta Altinate starts in the ancient Roman city of Altino and passes through Valsugana. It goes through Sovramonte, specifically in Aune, Servo and Salzen.

==== Via dello Schener ====
The Via dello Schener was initially a path, later becoming a wider road connecting the Feltrino area and the Primiero Valley. It was travelled over centuries by shepherds, wayfarers and religious people. It was most clearly used under the Venetian Republic, the route passed by the Schener Castle which was used as a customs post. Today, the route is partially navigable as it is interrupted by the road, it starts in Bettola (Zorzoi) and finishes in Pontet (Montecroce).

=== Food Heritage ===
Sovramonte has a rich culinary heritage, mainly connected to fresh ingredients rather than specific dishes. One of Sovramonte's most famous foods is the Prussian apple (known locally as the 'Pom Prussian'). It was brought to Faller in Sovramonte by emigrants from Prussia, the variety dates back to the early 20th century. Today, in the same hamlet, the fruit is harvested in October and is marked by the Fiera della Mela Prussiana (Prussian apple fair) to celebrate the item.

Another historically important food from the area is the bean. The legume is traditionally grown on both sides of the valley, the variety is called the Lamon bean which has achieved PGI status. In addition to its many uses, an ancient custom is linked to it, the Menestra de San Dordi. This bean soup was first prepared in Sorriva in 1631 as a thanksgiving for the end of a plague epidemic that struck the village that year, and a vow to St George to protect the village's inhabitants from disease. Since then, the annual tradition has been carried on by many households.

Municipal Building, Servo

The frescoes in Chiesa San Giorgio

==== World War One ====
When Italy entered the war in 1915, Sovramonte sat directly beside the Austro-Hungarian border (modern-day Trentino). Following the Italian defeat at Caporetto in autumn 1917, Austro-Hungarian troops occupied the Sovramonte plateau for roughly a year, this period is known locally as the anno della fame (year of hunger) in which 28 civilians died of starvation.

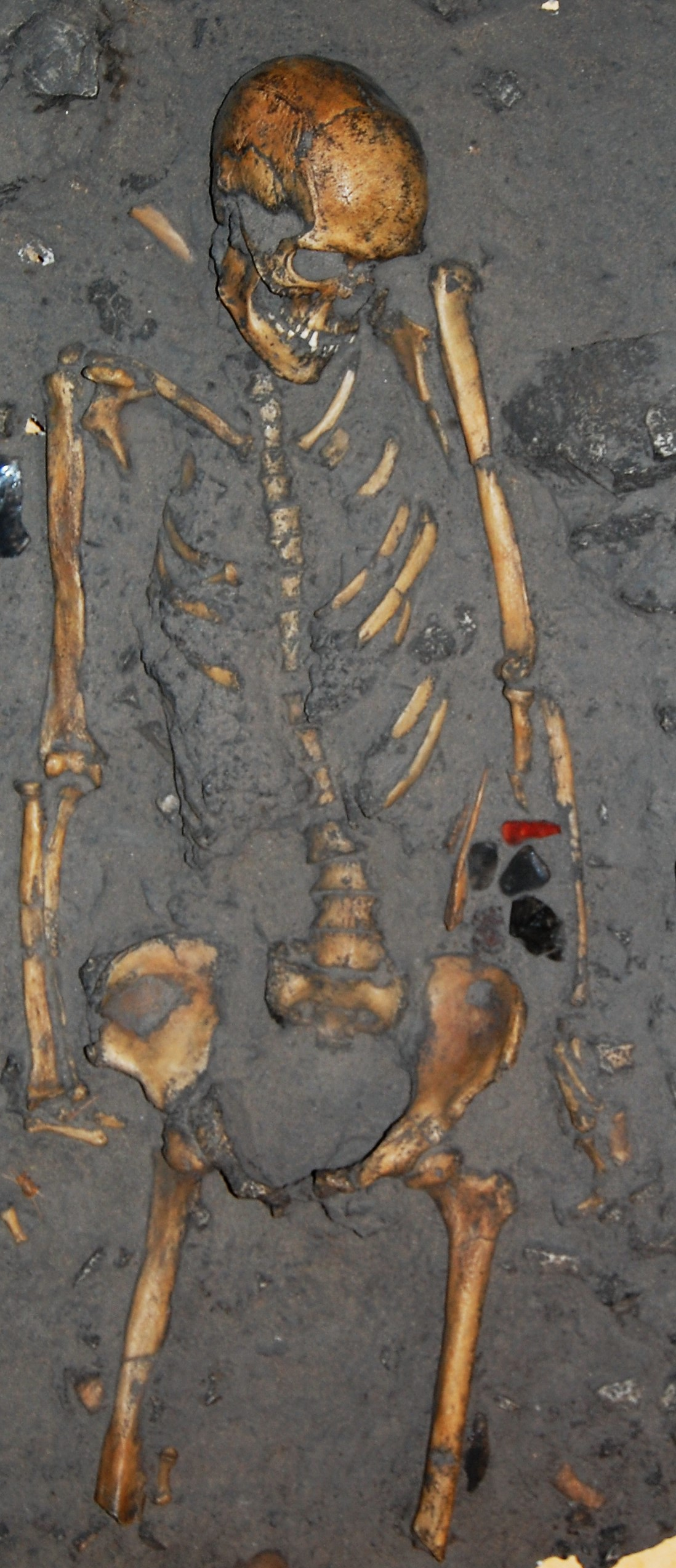
Skeleton of the Uomo della Val Rosna

==== World War Two ====
After Italy's armistice in 1943, the Belluno province was annexed by Nazi Germany into what was called 'Alpenvorland'. This placed the region under German administration and introduced forced labour conscription. The partisans took to the mountains, forming secret groups and performing acts of resistance. On August 5th, 1944, a woodcutter from San Gregorio nelle Alpi was shot by anti-resistance forces. After the death of Hitler's soldiers during clashes with partisans, the army burned Aune in retaliation on August 11th, 1944. Following the war, the local community rebuilt the village from the ground up.

== Geography ==
==== Topography and Climate ====
Aune, Chiesa di San Pietro and its cemetery

Sovramonte's altitude spans 1,961m and averages out at around 600m. Part of the comune lies within the Dolomiti Bellunesi National Park, notable features that lie within the park include Monte Pavione, the highest of the Vette Feltrine, Monte Vallazza and the Croce d'Aune pass. Due to its location in the mountains, Sovramonte experiences snowfall in winter, though it has reduced in recent years, probably due to climate change. Average temperatures and precipitation figures vary across the comune due to its wide elevation range. Common sedimentary rocks in the area include grey limestone, red ammonite and Biancone. The Circhi delle Vette are suspended glacial basins carved by ancient glaciers and later hollowed out by karst water erosion. The most prominent example is the Busa delle Vette, a wide amphitheatre featuring morainic banks and limestone pavements. The Vette Feltrine also form a natural border with Trentino Alto Adige. The Cismon river flows through the valley beneath Sovramonte and forms the border with Lamon. This river is crossed primarily via Ponte Oltra and Ponte Serra. The area is prone to thunderstorms, especially in summer. Its mountainous terrain makes it susceptible to landslides and it is classed as medium-high risk of earthquakes.

== Main Sights ==
- Museo dell'Uomo della Val Rosna. Features exhibits and reproductions centered on the 14,000 year old burial of the Man of Val Rosna.
- Chiesa di San Giorgio. Contains 16th century frescoes.
- Claudia Augusta Altinate. Sections of the ancient trail are located across the comune.
- Riserva Naturale Monte Pavione. A quiet, protected reserve with hiking trails and high mountain scenery.

== Notable People ==
- Louis Rech, politician and trade unionist.
- Gino Agostino Antoniol, partisan and Gold Medal of Military Valour recipient.
- Solideo d'Incau, killed in World War Two, recipient of the Gold Medal of Miltary Valour.

== Demographic evolution ==
Sovramonte's population has declined largely due to declining birth rates, young people moving to urban areas and a natural population deficit of 40 births per 100 deaths. Sovramonte is currently at risk of losing its culture due to depopulation.

Historical population

Year	Pop.	±%
1861	?	—
1871	3,569	—
1881	3,585	+0.4%
1901	3,666	+2.3%
1911	4,225	+15.2%

Year	Pop.	±%
1921	4,308	+2.0%
1931	3,460	−19.7%
1936	3,102	−10.3%
1951	3,438	+10.8%
1961	2,904	−15.5%

Year	Pop.	±%
1971	2,150	−26.0%
1981	1,981	−7.9%
1991	1,818	−8.2%
2001	1,697	−6.7%

Source: Data from ISTAT
