= Pieve Tesino =

- Comune
- Comune di Pieve Tesino
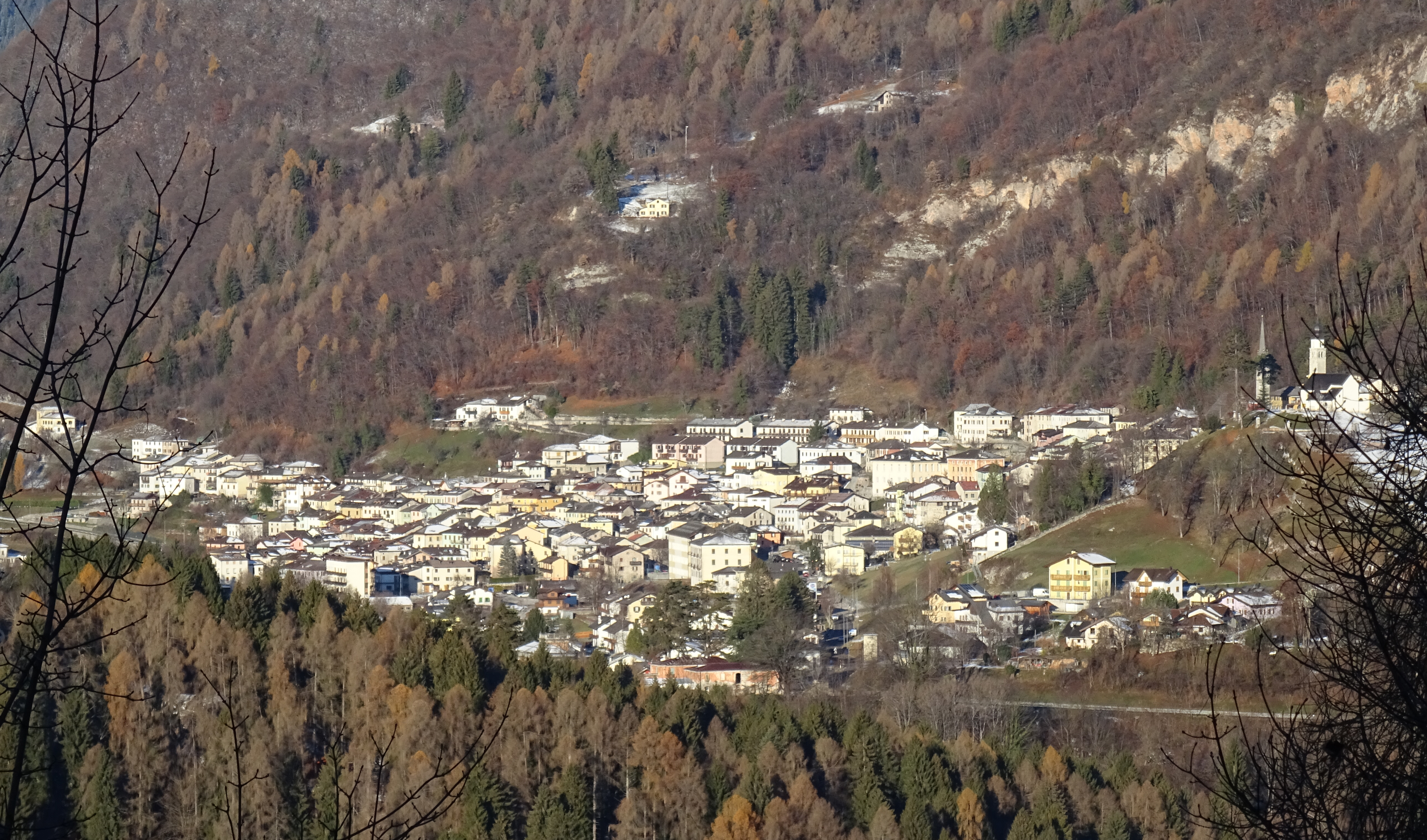

- Coat of arms

- Location within Italy Location within Trentino-Alto Adige/Südtirol
- Coordinates: 46°4′N 11°37′E
- Country: Italy
- Region: Trentino-Alto Adige/Südtirol
- Province: Trentino (TN)

Government
  - Mayor: Oscar Nervo

Area
  - Total: 73.5 km^{2} (28.4 sq mi)

Population (Dec. 2004)
  - Total: 743
  - Density: 10.1/km^{2} (26.2/sq mi)
- Time zone: UTC+1 (CET)
  - Summer (DST): UTC+2 (CEST)
- Postal code: 38050
- Dialing code: 0461
- Website: Official website

Pieve Tesino (La Piève in local dialect) is a comune (municipality) in Trentino in the northern Italian region Trentino-Alto Adige/Südtirol, located about 40 kilometres (25 mi) east of Trento.

Pieve Tesino borders the following municipalities: Tesero, Panchià, Ziano di Fiemme, Cavalese, Castello-Molina di Fiemme, Canal San Bovo, Castello Tesino, Telve, Scurelle, Cinte Tesino, Bieno, Strigno, Ivano-Fracena and Ospedaletto. It is one of I Borghi più belli d'Italia ("The most beautiful villages of Italy").

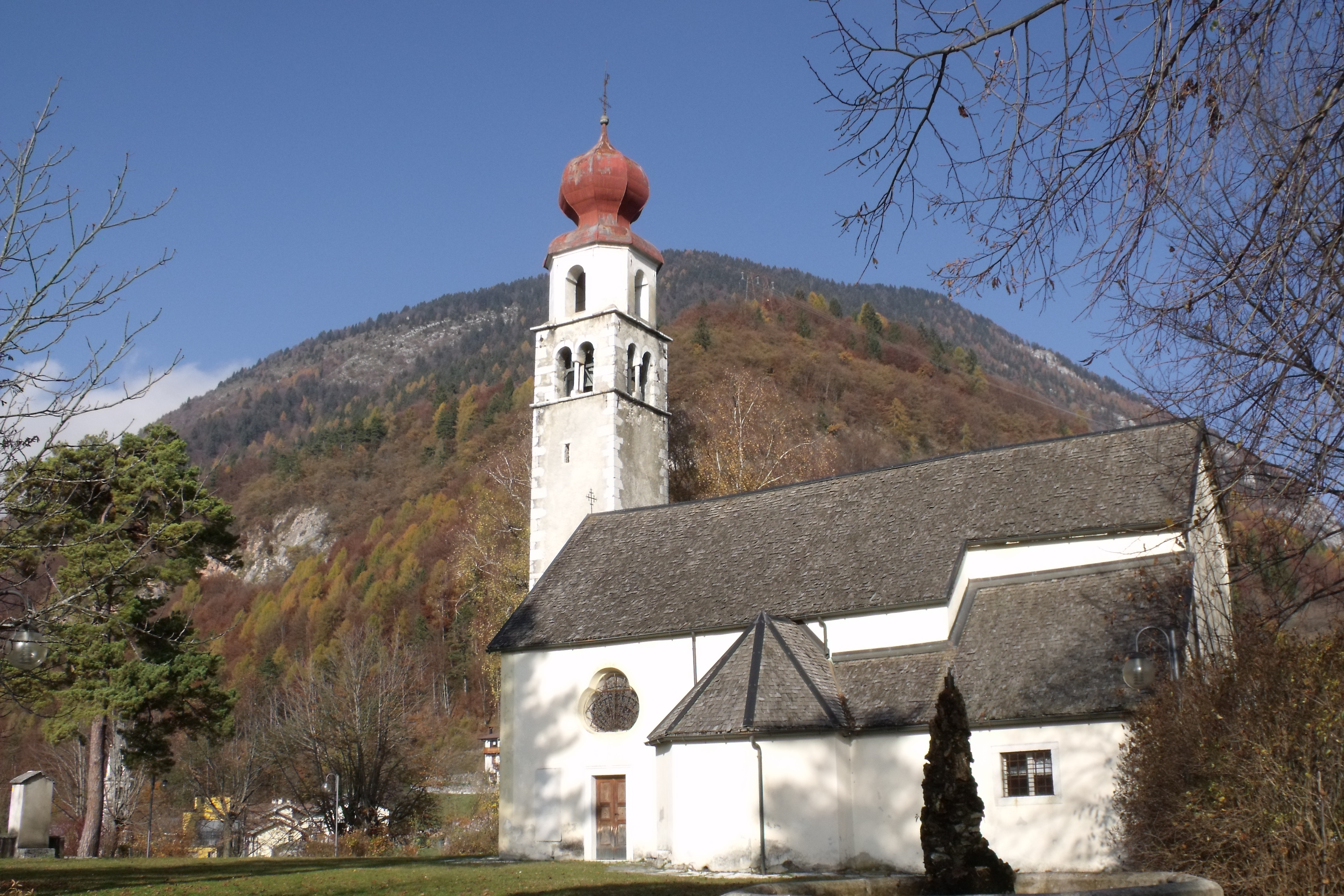
Church of San Sebastiano

== Demographic evolution ==
Historical population

Year	Pop.	±%
1861	?	—
1871	?	—
1881	?	—
1901	?	—
1911	?	—

Year	Pop.	±%
1921	1,356	—
1931	1,278	−5.8%
1936	1,226	−4.1%
1951	1,246	+1.6%
1961	1,108	−11.1%

Year	Pop.	±%
1971	969	−12.5%
1981	865	−10.7%
1991	795	−8.1%
2001	772	−2.9%

Source: Data from ISTAT

== Notable people ==
- Alcide De Gasperi (1881-1954), prime minister of Italy and one of the founding fathers of the European Union.
