= Pedavena =

- Comune
- Comune di Pedavena
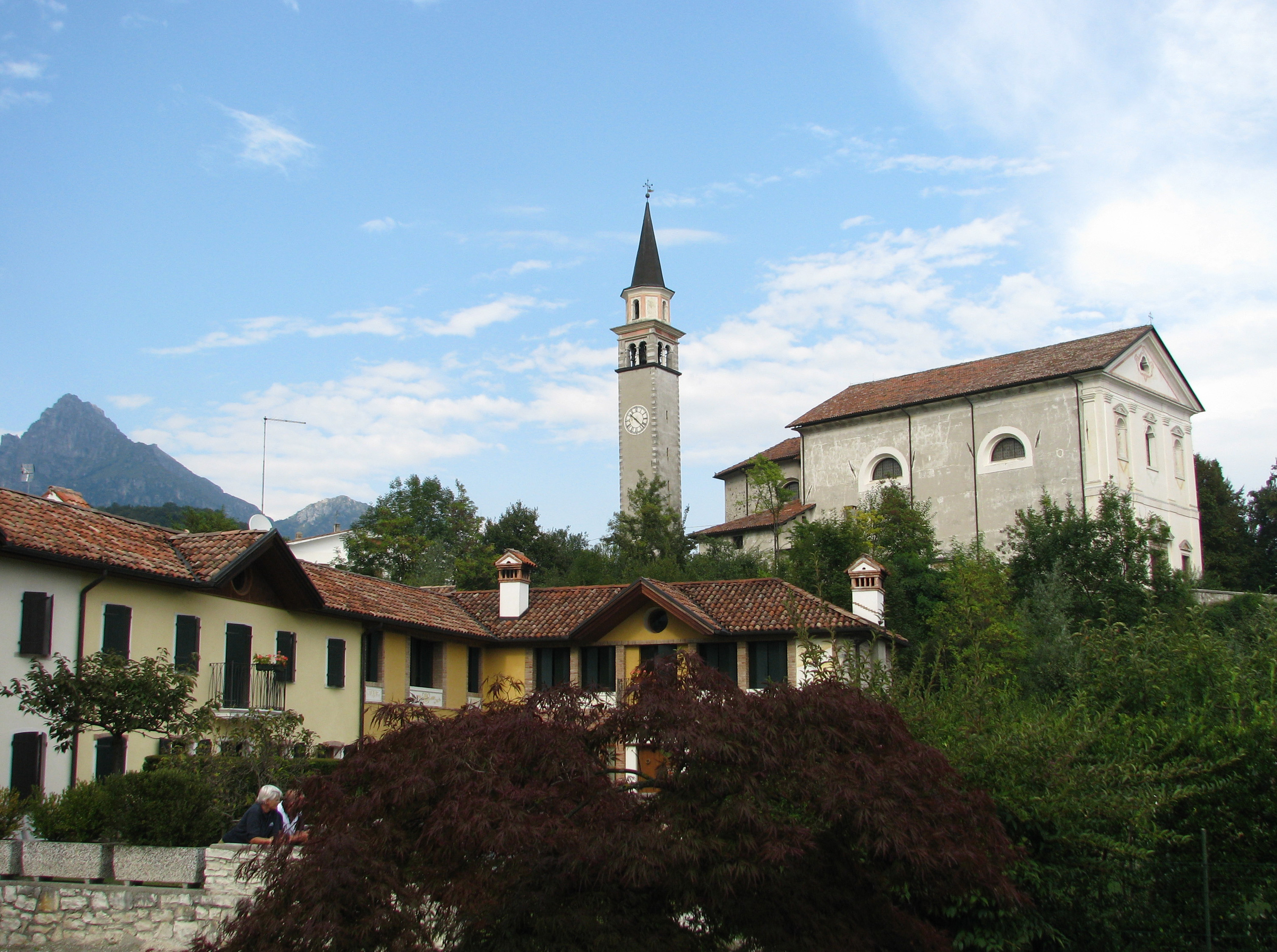

- Location within Italy Location within Veneto
- Coordinates: 46°2′N 11°53′E
- Country: Italy
- Region: Veneto
- Province: Belluno (BL)
- Frazioni: Carpene, Facen, Festisei, Murle, Norcen, Sega Bassa, S. Osvaldo, Teven, Travagola

Government
  - Mayor: Nicola Castellaz

Area
  - Total: 25.06 km^{2} (9.68 sq mi)
- Elevation: 356 m (1,168 ft)

Population (31 December 2016)
  - Total: 4,434
  - Density: 176.9/km^{2} (458.3/sq mi)
- Demonym: Pedavenesi
- Time zone: UTC+1 (CET)
  - Summer (DST): UTC+2 (CEST)
- Postal code: 32034
- Dialing code: 0439
- Website: Official website

Pedavena is a comune (municipality) in the province of Belluno in the Italian region of Veneto. It is located about 70 kilometres (43 mi) northwest of Venice and about 30 kilometres (19 mi) southwest of Belluno.

Pedavena borders the following municipalities: Feltre, Fonzaso, Sovramonte.
