= Scurelle =

Scurelle Scurełe
- Comune
- Comune di Scurelle
- Location within Italy Location within Trentino-Alto Adige/Südtirol
- Coordinates: 46°4′N 11°31′E
- Country: Italy
- Region: Trentino-Alto Adige/Südtirol
- Province: Trentino (TN)

Government
  - Mayor: Lorenza Ropelato

Area
  - Total: 29.9 km^{2} (11.5 sq mi)

Population (Dec. 2004)
  - Total: 1,322
  - Density: 44.2/km^{2} (115/sq mi)
- Time zone: UTC+1 (CET)
  - Summer (DST): UTC+2 (CEST)
- Postal code: 38050
- Dialing code: 0461
- Website: Official website

Scurelle (Scurełe in local dialect) is a comune (municipality) in Trentino in the northern Italian region Trentino-Alto Adige/Südtirol, located about 30 kilometres (19 mi) east of Trento. As of December 31st 2004, it had a population of 1,322 and an area of 29.9 square kilometres (11.5 mi^{2}).

Scurelle borders the following municipalities: Pieve Tesino, Castello Tesino, Telve, Cinte Tesino, Bieno, Strigno, Spera, Carzano, Villa Agnedo and Castelnuovo.

== Demographic evolution ==
Historical population

Year	Pop.	±%
1861	?	—
1871	?	—
1881	?	—
1901	?	—
1911	?	—

Year	Pop.	±%
1921	1,031	—
1931	1,034	+0.3%
1936	990	−4.3%
1951	1,089	+10.0%
1961	1,113	+2.2%

Year	Pop.	±%
1971	1,149	+3.2%
1981	1,237	+7.7%
1991	1,232	−0.4%
2001	1,276	+3.6%

Source: Data from ISTAT
