= Castello Tesino =

- Comune
- Comune di Castello Tesino
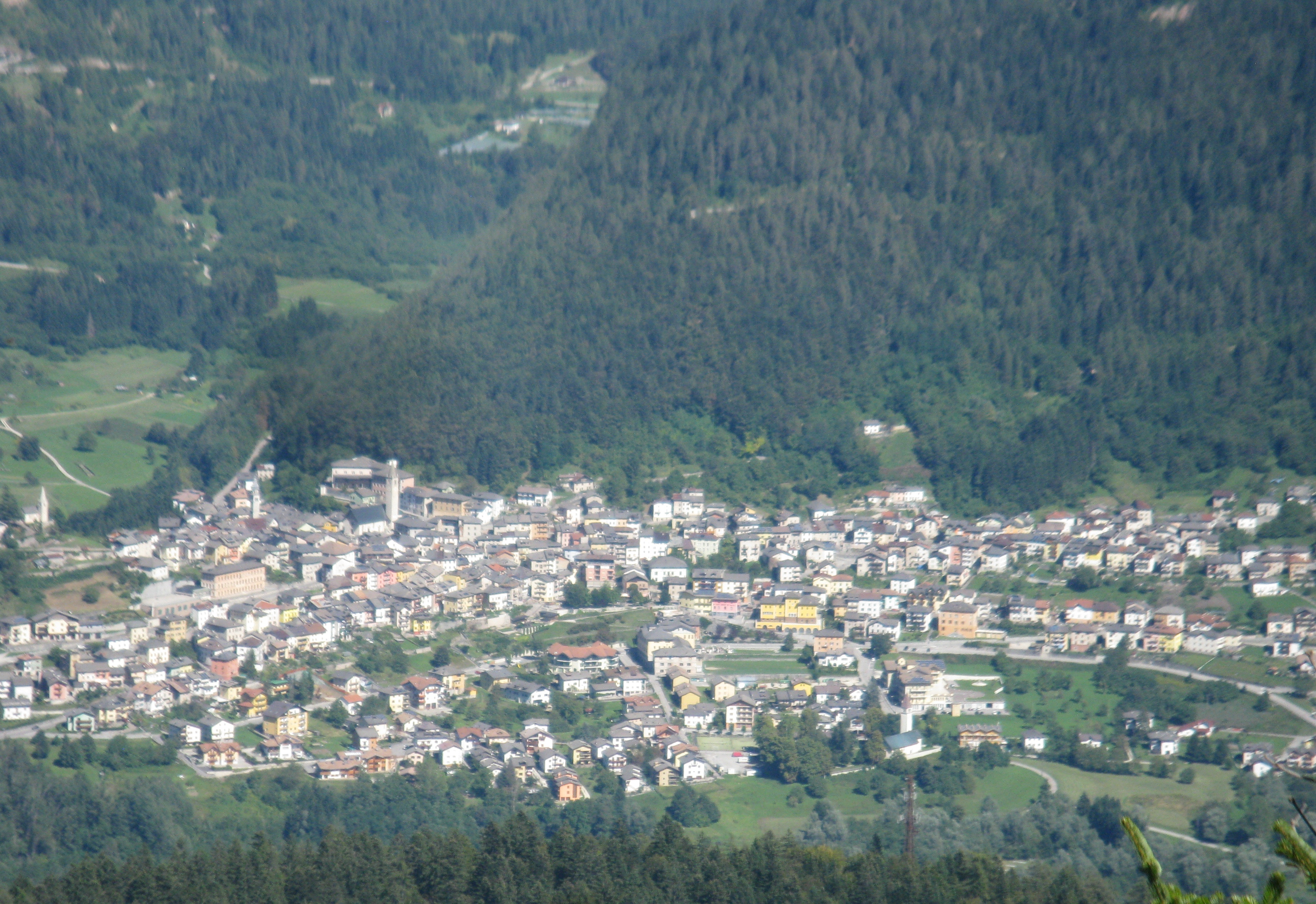

- Location within Italy Location within Trentino-Alto Adige/Südtirol
- Coordinates: 46°4′N 11°37′E
- Country: Italy
- Region: Trentino-Alto Adige/Südtirol
- Province: Trentino (TN)
- Frazioni: Coronini, Lissa and Roa

Government
  - Mayor: Lucio Muraro

Area
  - Total: 112.84 km^{2} (43.57 sq mi)
- Elevation: 905 m (2,969 ft)

Population (2026)
  - Total: 1,157
  - Density: 10.25/km^{2} (26.56/sq mi)
- Demonym: Castelazzi
- Time zone: UTC+1 (CET)
  - Summer (DST): UTC+2 (CEST)
- Postal code: 38053
- Dialing code: 0461
- Website: Official website

Castello Tesino (Castèl Tasìn or Castèlo in local dialect) is a comune (municipality) in Trentino in the northern Italian region Trentino-Alto Adige/Südtirol, located about 40 kilometres (25 mi) east of Trento.

Castello Tesino borders the following municipalities: Canal San Bovo, Pieve Tesino, Scurelle, Cinte Tesino, Lamon, Grigno, and Arsiè.

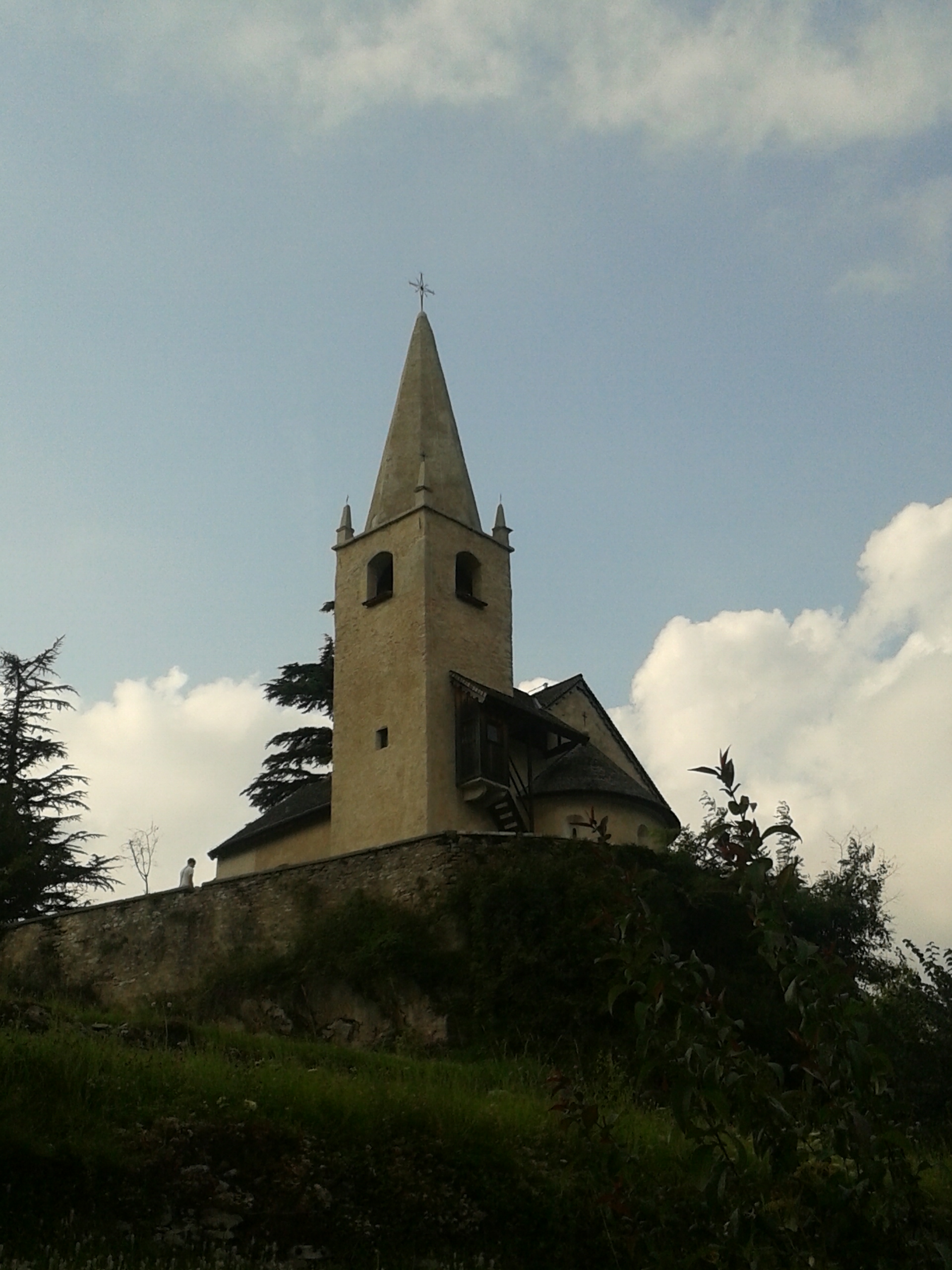
Church of Sant'Ippolito
