= Arsiè =

- Comune
- Comune di Arsiè
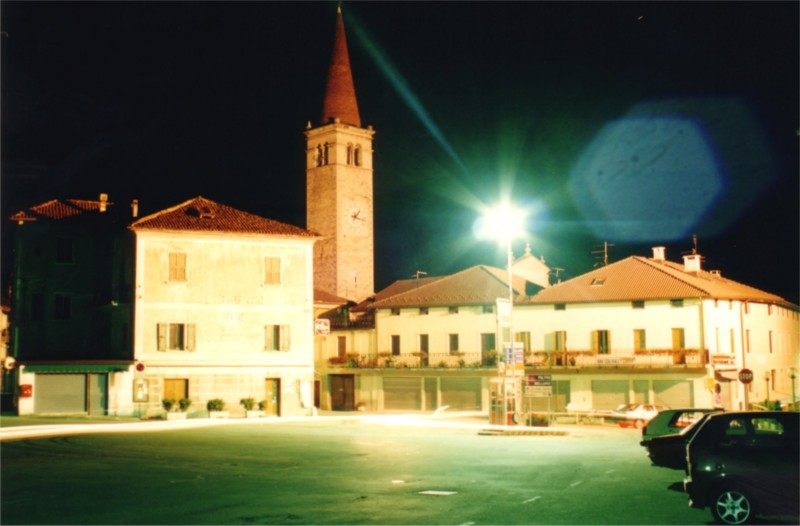

- Location of Arsiè in Italy Arsiè (Veneto)
- Coordinates: 45°59′N 11°45′E
- Country: Italy
- Region: Veneto
- Province: Province of Belluno (BL)
- Frazioni: Mellame, Rocca, Fastro, Rivai, San Vito

Government
  - Mayor: Ivano Faoro

Area
  - Total: 65.0 km^{2} (25.1 sq mi)
- Elevation: 315 m (1,033 ft)

Population (Dec. 2004)
  - Total: 2,748
  - Density: 42.3/km^{2} (109/sq mi)
- Demonym: Arsedesi
- Time zone: UTC+1 (CET)
  - Summer (DST): UTC+2 (CEST)
- Postal code: 32030
- Dialing code: 0439
- Website: Official website

Arsiè is a comune (municipality) in the province of Belluno in the Italian region of Veneto, located about 80 kilometres (50 mi) northwest of Venice and about 40 kilometres (25 mi) southwest of Belluno. As of 31 December 2004, it had a population of 2,748 and an area of 65.0 square kilometres (25.1 mi^{2}).

The municipality of Arsiè contains the frazioni (subdivisions, mainly villages and hamlets) Mellame, Rocca, Fastro, Rivai, and San Vito.

Arsiè borders the following municipalities: Castello Tesino, Cismon del Grappa, Enego, Fonzaso, Grigno, Lamon, Seren del Grappa and Pontet (a frazione of Imer, TN).

== Demographic evolution ==
Historical population

Year	Pop.	±%
1861	?	—
1871	6,884	—
1881	7,051	+2.4%
1901	7,694	+9.1%
1911	8,675	+12.8%

Year	Pop.	±%
1921	8,264	−4.7%
1931	6,827	−17.4%
1936	5,704	−16.4%
1951	6,318	+10.8%
1961	5,304	−16.0%

Year	Pop.	±%
1971	4,050	−23.6%
1981	3,325	−17.9%
1991	2,920	−12.2%
2001	2,806	−3.9%

Source: Data from ISTAT
