= Ripari Villabruna =

Cave and archaeological site in Italy

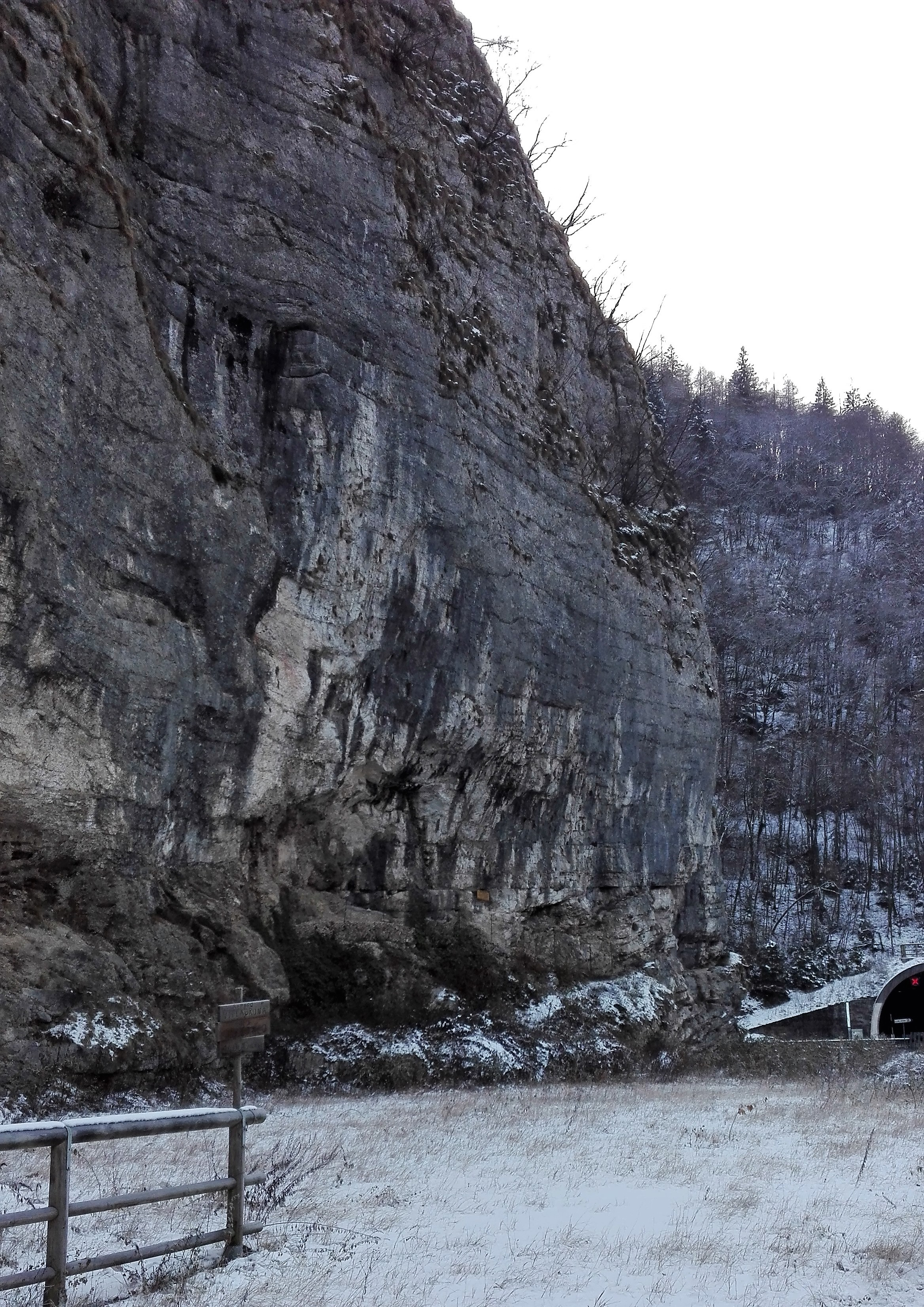

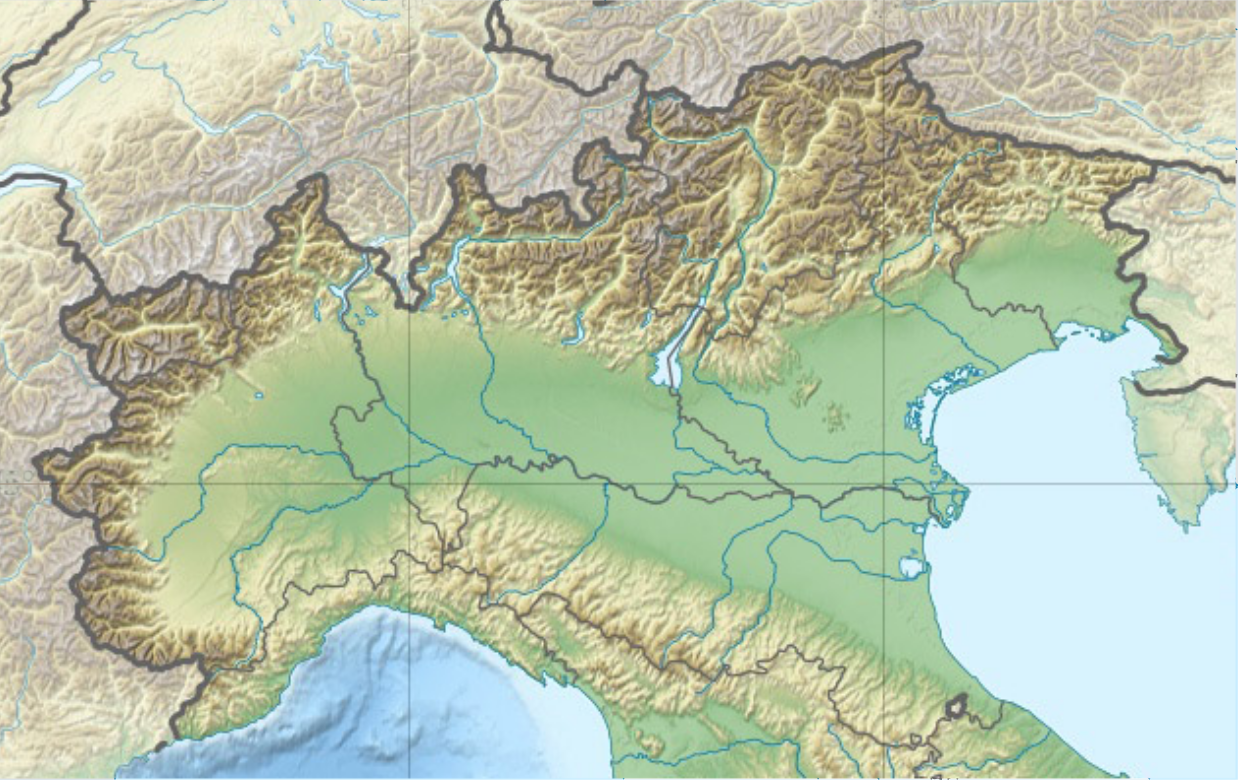
- location in Italy Ripari Villabruna (Italy)
- 46°05′03.4″N 11°45′51.6″E
- Type: Abri
- Cultures: Epigravettian, 14,000 years ago
- Associated with: Cro-Magnon
- Location: near Feltre
- Region: Cismon valley, province of Belluno, Italy

Site notes
- Excavation dates: late 1980s
- Archaeologists: Giuseppe Vercellotti

Ripari Villabruna is a small rock shelter in northern Italy with Mesolithic burial remains. It contains several Cro-Magnon burials, with bodies and grave goods dated to 14,000 years BP. The site has added greatly to the understanding of the Mesolithic development of medical and religious practices in early human communities.

== History ==
The ablation and removal of debris in the Cismon valley, in the Sovramonte municipality, province of Belluno, Italy during the late 1980s led to the discovery of several rock shelters (abris). Located at a height of 500 m (1,600 ft) above sea level they show impressive traces of settlement by prehistoric people and their activities. The rock shelters, named after their discoverer "Ripari Villabruna", are part of a complex system of sites that reach from the lowest points of the valley to alpine heights. Excavations confirm that humans frequently occupied the site for short periods in a late Epigravettian cultural context, carbon dated to begin around 14,000 years ago and continuing to the middle of the ensuing Holocene.

== Villabruna 1 ==
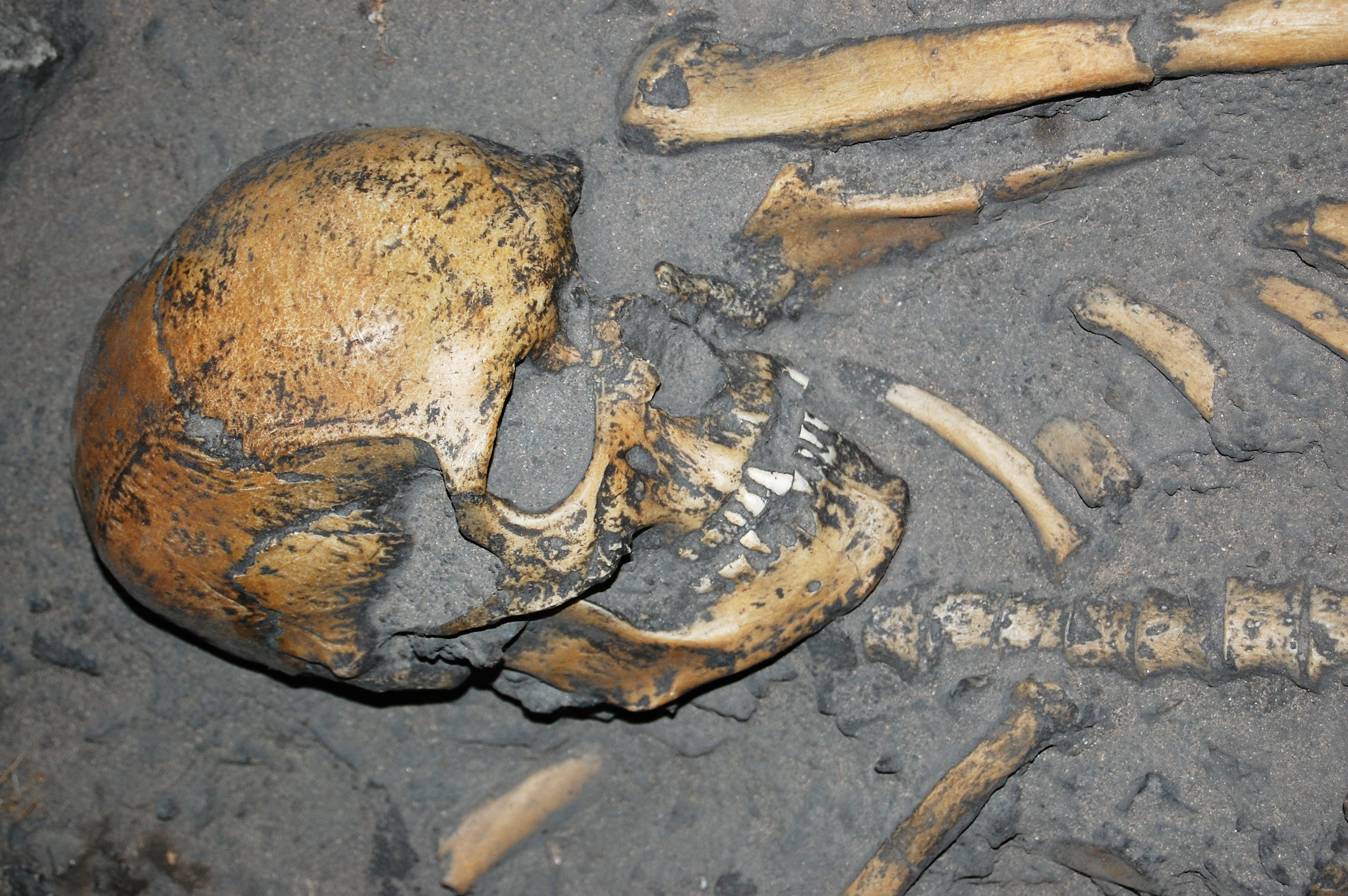
Skull of skeleton Villabruna 1

A grave that contained a well-preserved skeleton was discovered at the base of the archaeological layers in 1988. Direct AMS dating of the skeletal remains revealed a date 14,160 to 13,820 years before present. The burial took place during the first stages of the human settlement in the rock shelters. The corpse was placed into a narrow, shallow pit 30 to 40 cm (12 to 16 in) in depth, the head turned to the left with arms stretched touching the body, and were of an adult male, about twenty-five years old, characterized by a relatively tall stature for the time period.

Six grave attachments were placed to the body's left. The typical equipment of a hunter-gatherer included a flint (fire stone) knife, a flint core, another stone as hammer, a blade of flint, a bone tip, a pellet of ochre and Propolis (a resinous matter, produced by bees). Limestone platelets decorated with ochre drawings had been placed on top of the tomb.

The excellent preservation of the Villabruna 1 skeleton helped to thoroughly investigate various aspects of skeletal biology, such as body size, craniofacial morphology, tooth wear, functional anatomy, and nutritional and pathological aspects. Comparing Villabruna 1 and similar finds with today's people widened the understanding of biocultural adjustments, the living conditions and survival strategies of the Paleolithic population of Europe.

Villabruna 1 is significant in terms of the genetic history of Europe: the remains were found to carry Y-DNA haplogroup R1b1a-L754* (xL389,V88). This is the oldest documented example of haplogroup R1b found anywhere.
