= Bieno =

- Comune
- Comune di Bieno
- Location within Italy Location within Trentino-Alto Adige/Südtirol
- Coordinates: 46°5′N 11°33′E
- Country: Italy
- Region: Trentino-Alto Adige/Südtirol
- Province: Trentino (TN)

Government
  - Mayor: Giorgio Mario Tognolli

Area
  - Total: 11.7 km^{2} (4.5 sq mi)

Population (2026)
  - Total: 481
  - Density: 41.1/km^{2} (106/sq mi)
- Time zone: UTC+1 (CET)
  - Summer (DST): UTC+2 (CEST)
- Postal code: 38050
- Dialing code: 0461
- Website: Official website

Bieno (Bién in local dialect) is a comune (municipality) in Trentino in the northern Italian region Trentino-Alto Adige/Südtirol, located about 35 kilometres (22 mi) east of Trento. As of 31 December 2004, it had a population of 447 and an area of 11.7 square kilometres (4.5 mi^{2}).

Bieno borders the following municipalities: Pieve Tesino, Scurelle, and Strigno.

== Demographic evolution ==
Historical population

Year	Pop.	±%
1861	?	—
1871	?	—
1881	?	—
1901	?	—
1911	?	—

Year	Pop.	±%
1921	1,120	—
1931	673	−39.9%
1936	598	−11.1%
1951	599	+0.2%
1961	577	−3.7%

Year	Pop.	±%
1971	470	−18.5%
1981	413	−12.1%
1991	422	+2.2%
2001	441	+4.5%

Source: Data from ISTAT
