= Seren del Grappa =

- Comune
- Comune di Seren del Grappa
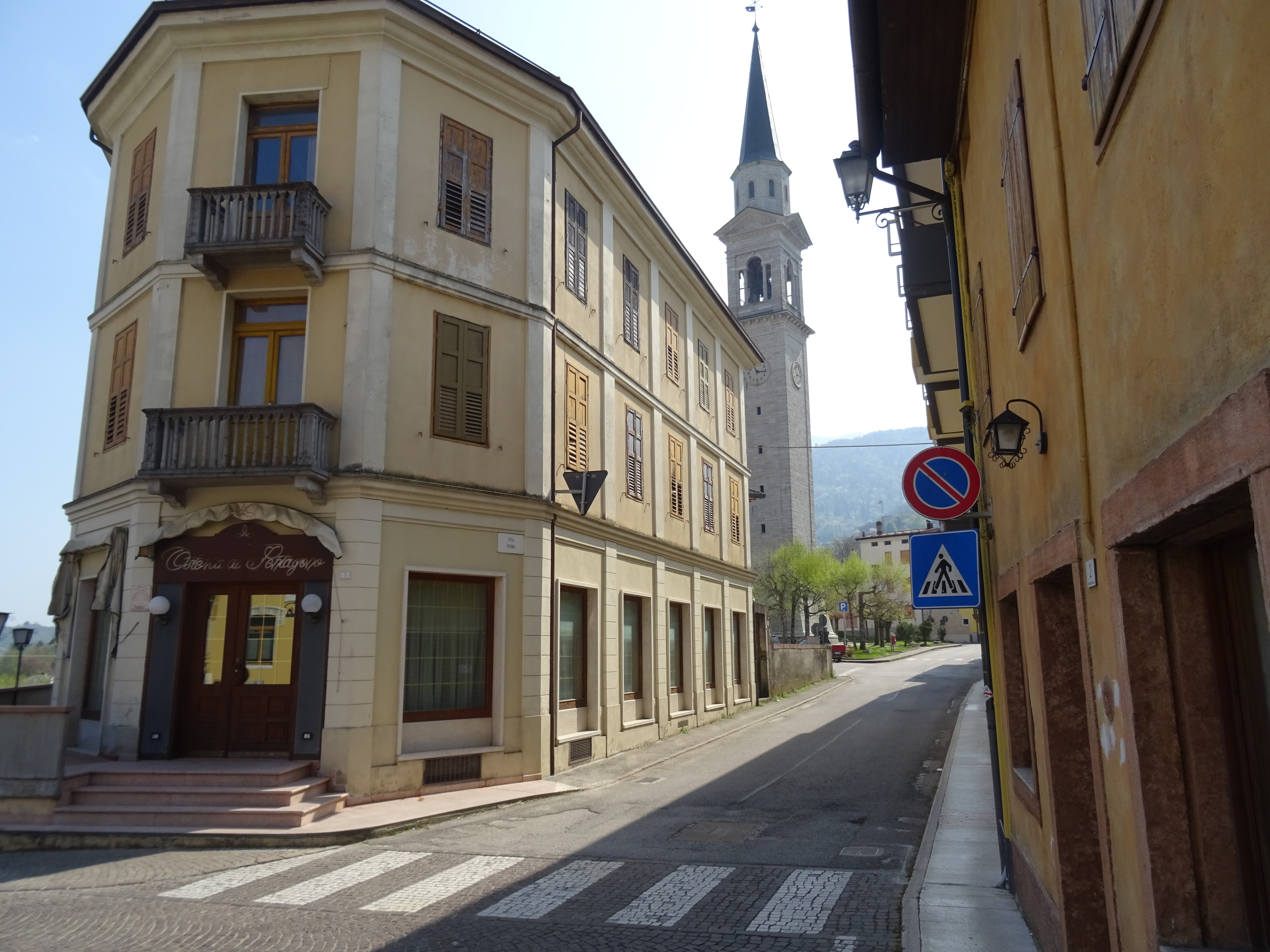

- Location within Italy Location within Veneto
- Coordinates: 45°59′N 11°51′E
- Country: Italy
- Region: Veneto
- Province: Province of Belluno (BL)

Area
  - Total: 62.4 km^{2} (24.1 sq mi)

Population (Dec. 2004)
  - Total: 2,586
  - Density: 41.4/km^{2} (107/sq mi)
- Time zone: UTC+1 (CET)
  - Summer (DST): UTC+2 (CEST)
- Postal code: 32030
- Dialing code: 0439

Seren del Grappa is a comune (municipality) in the province of Belluno in the Italian region of Veneto, located about 70 kilometres (43 mi) northwest of Venice and about 35 kilometres (22 mi) southwest of Belluno. As of 31 December 2004, it had a population of 2,586 and an area of 62.4 square kilometres (24.1 mi^{2}).

Seren del Grappa borders the municipalities of Arsiè, Feltre, Fonzaso, Pieve del Grappa, Setteville, and Valbrenta.

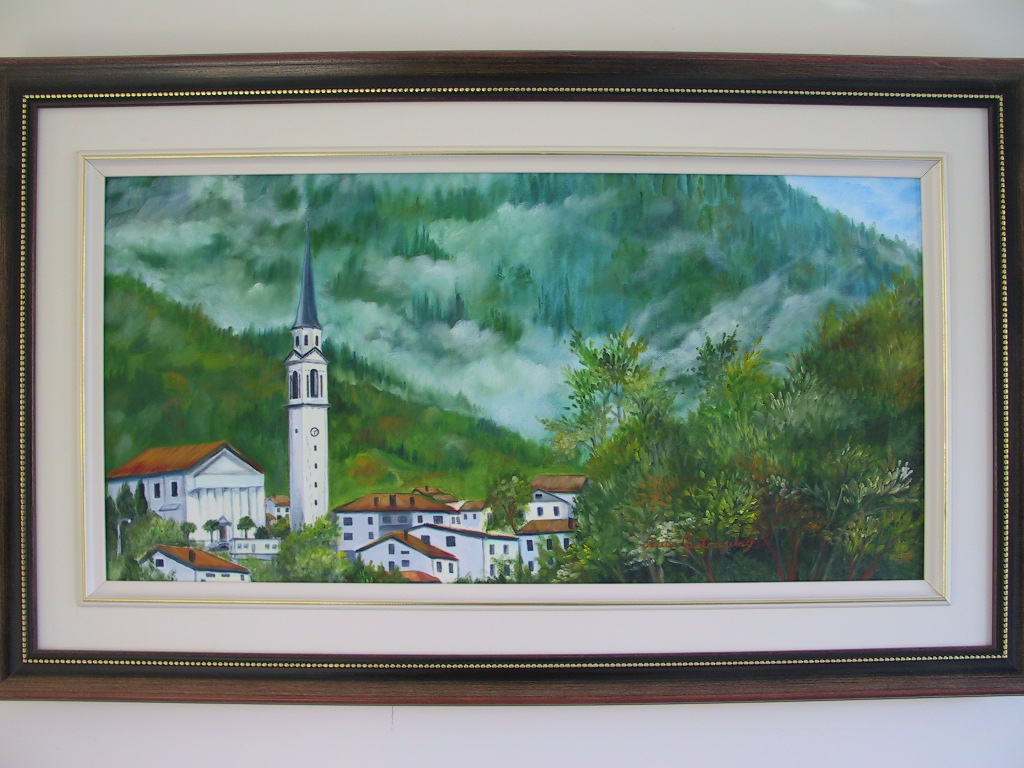
Oil painting of the town on canvas

== Demographic evolution ==
Historical population

Year	Pop.	±%
1861	?	—
1871	4,273	—
1881	4,833	+13.1%
1901	4,661	−3.6%
1911	5,264	+12.9%

Year	Pop.	±%
1921	5,025	−4.5%
1931	4,433	−11.8%
1936	3,705	−16.4%
1951	3,820	+3.1%
1961	3,364	−11.9%

Year	Pop.	±%
1971	2,785	−17.2%
1981	2,534	−9.0%
1991	2,480	−2.1%
2001	2,607	+5.1%

Source: Data from ISTAT
