= Castelnuovo, Trentino =

Castelnuovo
- Comune
- Comune di Castelnuovo
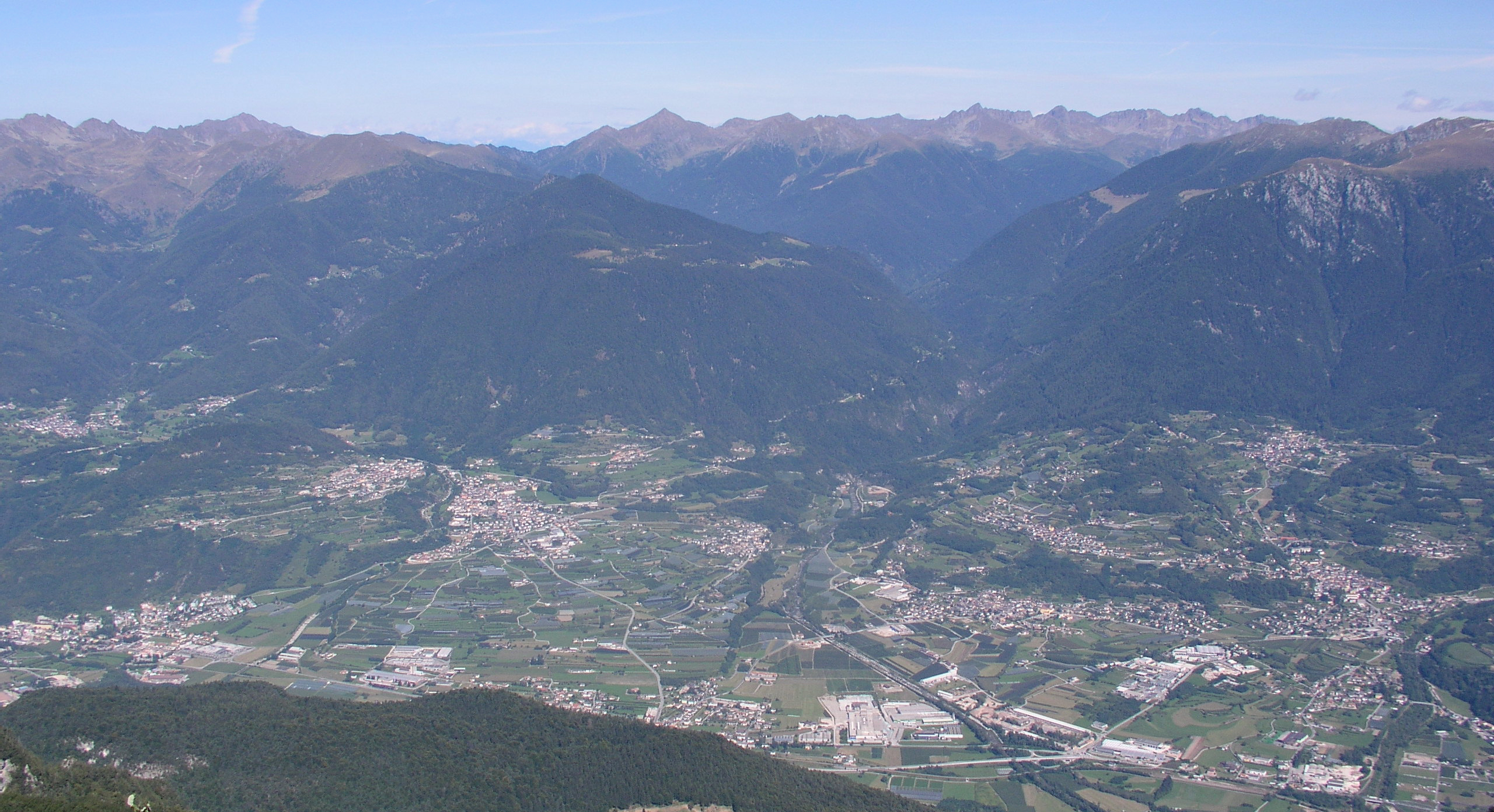

- Location within Italy Location within Trentino-Alto Adige/Südtirol
- Coordinates: 46°3′N 11°29′E
- Country: Italy
- Region: Trentino-Alto Adige/Südtirol
- Province: Trentino (TN)

Government
  - Mayor: Claudio Ceppinati

Area
  - Total: 13.5 km^{2} (5.2 sq mi)

Population (2026)
  - Total: 1,088
  - Density: 80.6/km^{2} (209/sq mi)
- Time zone: UTC+1 (CET)
  - Summer (DST): UTC+2 (CEST)
- Postal code: 38050
- Dialing code: 0461
- Website: Official website

Castelnuovo (Castarnóvo in local dialect) is a comune (municipality) in Trentino in the northern Italian region Trentino-Alto Adige/Südtirol, located about 30 kilometres (19 mi) east of Trento. As of 31 December 2004, it had a population of 926 and an area of 13.5 square kilometres (5.2 mi^{2}).

Castelnuovo borders the following municipalities: Telve, Scurelle, Carzano, Borgo Valsugana, Villa Agnedo and Asiago.

== Demographic evolution ==
Historical population

Year	Pop.	±%
1861	?	—
1871	?	—
1881	?	—
1901	?	—
1911	?	—

Year	Pop.	±%
1921	948	—
1931	1,048	+10.5%
1936	963	−8.1%
1951	1,012	+5.1%
1961	1,007	−0.5%

Year	Pop.	±%
1971	883	−12.3%
1981	864	−2.2%
1991	833	−3.6%
2001	896	+7.6%

Source: Data from ISTAT
