= Carzano =

- Comune
- Comune di Carzano
- Location within Italy Location within Trentino-Alto Adige/Südtirol
- Coordinates: 46°4′N 11°30′E
- Country: Italy
- Region: Trentino-Alto Adige/Südtirol
- Province: Trentino (TN)

Government
  - Mayor: Cesare Castelpietra

Area
  - Total: 1.7 km^{2} (0.66 sq mi)

Population (2026)
  - Total: 518
  - Density: 300/km^{2} (790/sq mi)
- Time zone: UTC+1 (CET)
  - Summer (DST): UTC+2 (CEST)
- Postal code: 38050
- Dialing code: 0461
- Website: Official website

Carzano (Carthàn or Carzàn in local dialect) is a comune (municipality) in Trentino in the northern Italian region Trentino-Alto Adige/Südtirol, located about 30 kilometres (19 mi) east of Trento. As of 31 December 2004, it had a population of 502 and an area of 1.7 square kilometres (0.66 mi^{2}).

Carzano borders the following municipalities: Telve, Scurelle, and Castelnuovo.

== Demographic evolution ==
Historical population

Year	Pop.	±%
1861	?	—
1871	?	—
1881	?	—
1901	?	—
1911	?	—

Year	Pop.	±%
1921	435	—
1931	453	+4.1%
1936	399	−11.9%
1951	452	+13.3%
1961	452	+0.0%

Year	Pop.	±%
1971	397	−12.2%
1981	370	−6.8%
1991	450	+21.6%
2001	499	+10.9%

Source: Data from ISTAT
