= Fonzaso =

- Comune
- Comune di Fonzaso
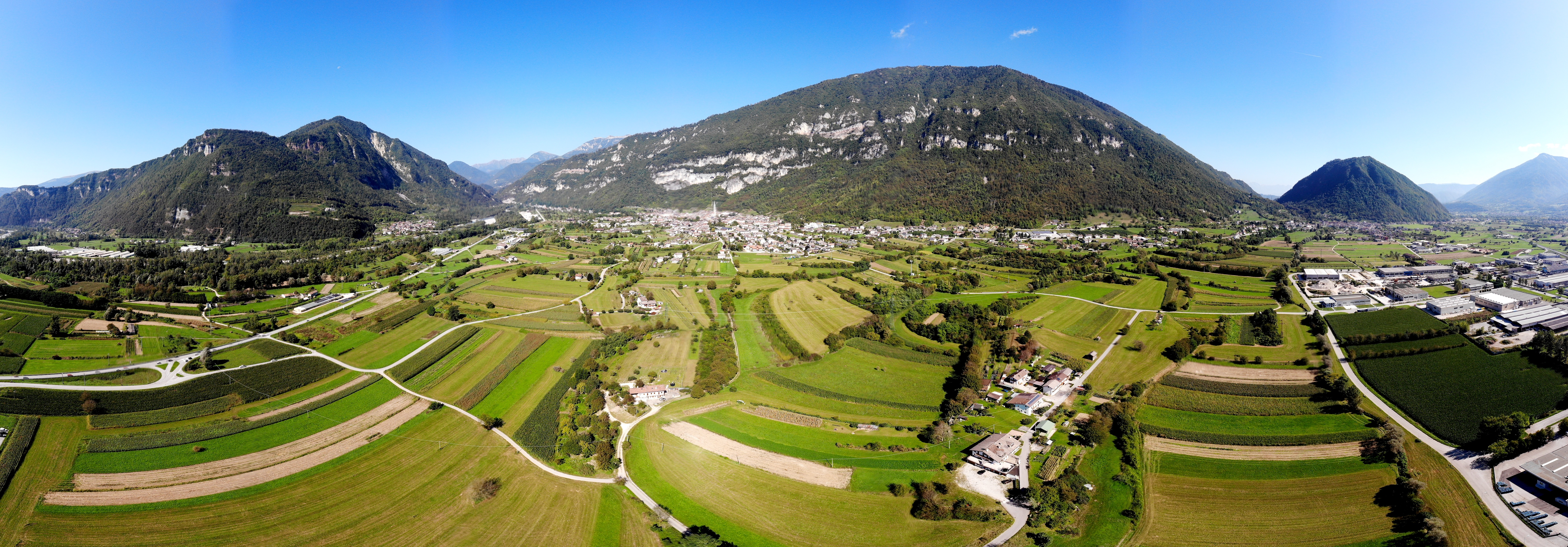

- Location within Italy Location within Veneto
- Coordinates: 46°1′N 11°48′E
- Country: Italy
- Region: Veneto
- Province: Province of Belluno (BL)

Area
  - Total: 27.5 km^{2} (10.6 sq mi)

Population (Dec. 2004)
  - Total: 3,412
  - Density: 124/km^{2} (321/sq mi)
- Time zone: UTC+1 (CET)
  - Summer (DST): UTC+2 (CEST)
- Postal code: 32030
- Dialing code: 0439

Fonzaso is a comune (municipality) in the Province of Belluno in the Italian region Veneto, located about 80 kilometres (50 mi) northwest of Venice and about 35 kilometres (22 mi) southwest of Belluno. As of 31 December 2004, it had a population of 3,412 and an area of 27.5 square kilometres (10.6 mi^{2}).

Fonzaso borders the following municipalities: Arsiè, Feltre, Lamon, Pedavena, Seren del Grappa, Sovramonte.

== Demographic evolution ==
Historical population

Year	Pop.	±%
1861	?	—
1871	4,965	—
1881	4,793	−3.5%
1901	5,854	+22.1%
1911	6,383	+9.0%

Year	Pop.	±%
1921	6,868	+7.6%
1931	5,224	−23.9%
1936	4,438	−15.0%
1951	4,523	+1.9%
1961	4,251	−6.0%

Year	Pop.	±%
1971	3,536	−16.8%
1981	3,536	+0.0%
1991	3,418	−3.3%
2001	3,414	−0.1%

Source: Data from ISTAT
