= Canal San Bovo =

- Comune
- Comune di Canal San Bovo
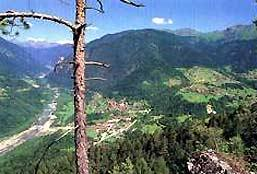

- Coat of arms

- Location within Italy Location within Trentino-Alto Adige/Südtirol
- Coordinates: 46°9′N 11°44′E
- Country: Italy
- Region: Trentino-Alto Adige/Südtirol
- Province: Trentino (TN)
- Frazioni: Caoria, Cicona, Gobbera, Prade, Ronco, Zortea

Government
  - Mayor: Bortolo Rattin

Area
  - Total: 125.5 km^{2} (48.5 sq mi)

Population (2026)
  - Total: 1,484
  - Density: 11.82/km^{2} (30.63/sq mi)
- Demonym: Canalini
- Time zone: UTC+1 (CET)
  - Summer (DST): UTC+2 (CEST)
- Postal code: 38050
- Dialing code: 0439
- Patron saint: St. Bartholomew the Apostle and St. Bovo
- Saint day: 24 August
- Website: Official website

Canal San Bovo (Canal in local dialect) is a comune (municipality) in Trentino in the northern Italian Region Trentino-Alto Adige/Südtirol, located about 90 kilometres (56 mi) north-east of Trento. Canal San Bovo is a typical alpine village; from 1401 to 1918 it was a possession of the Austro-Hungarian Empire.

== Twin towns ==
- Civitella Alfedena, Italy
