= Alta Valsugana e Bersntol =

Coordinates: 46°04′N 11°13′E

- Territory
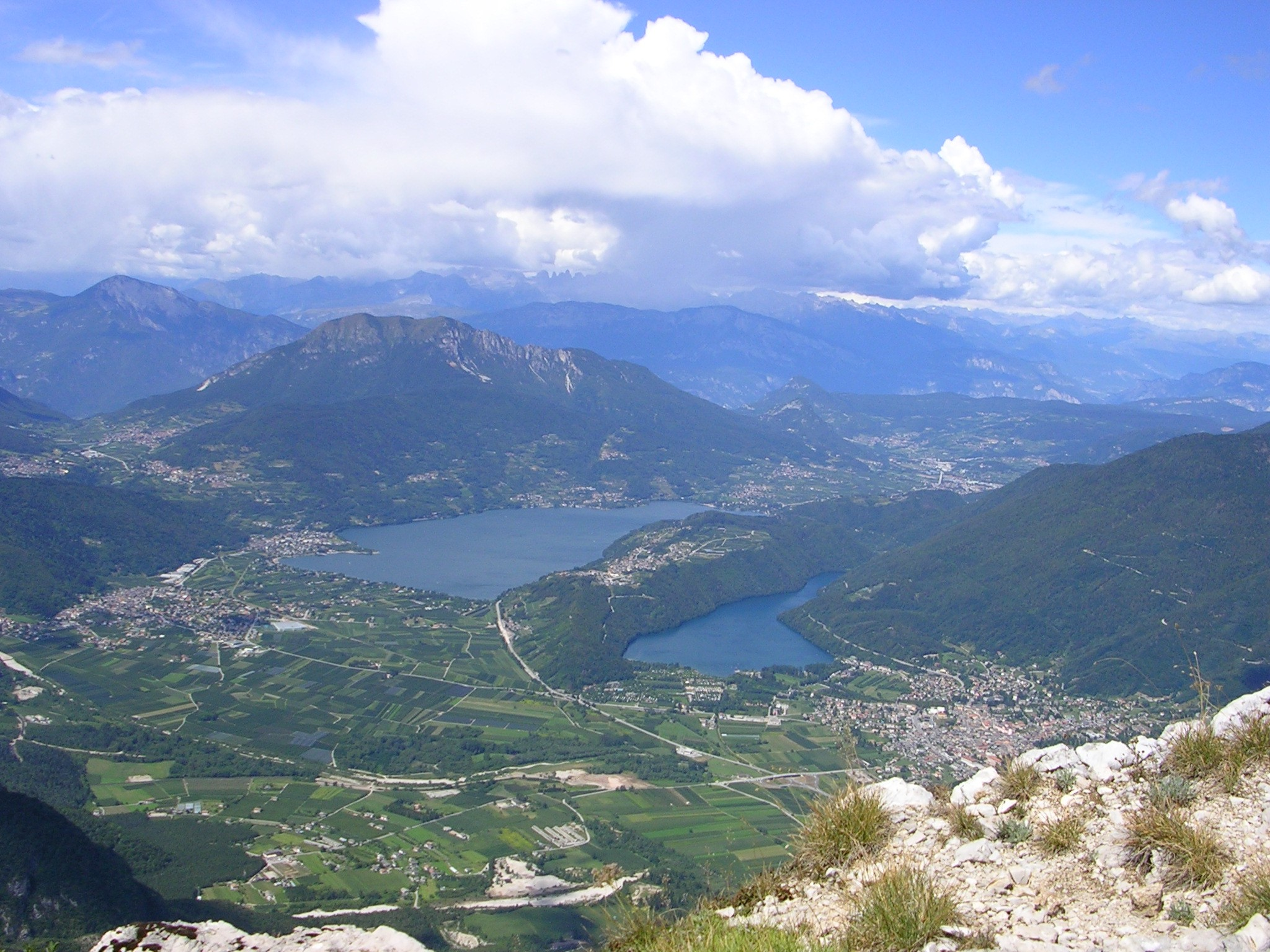
- View of Caldonazzo and Levico lakes from Cima Vezzena

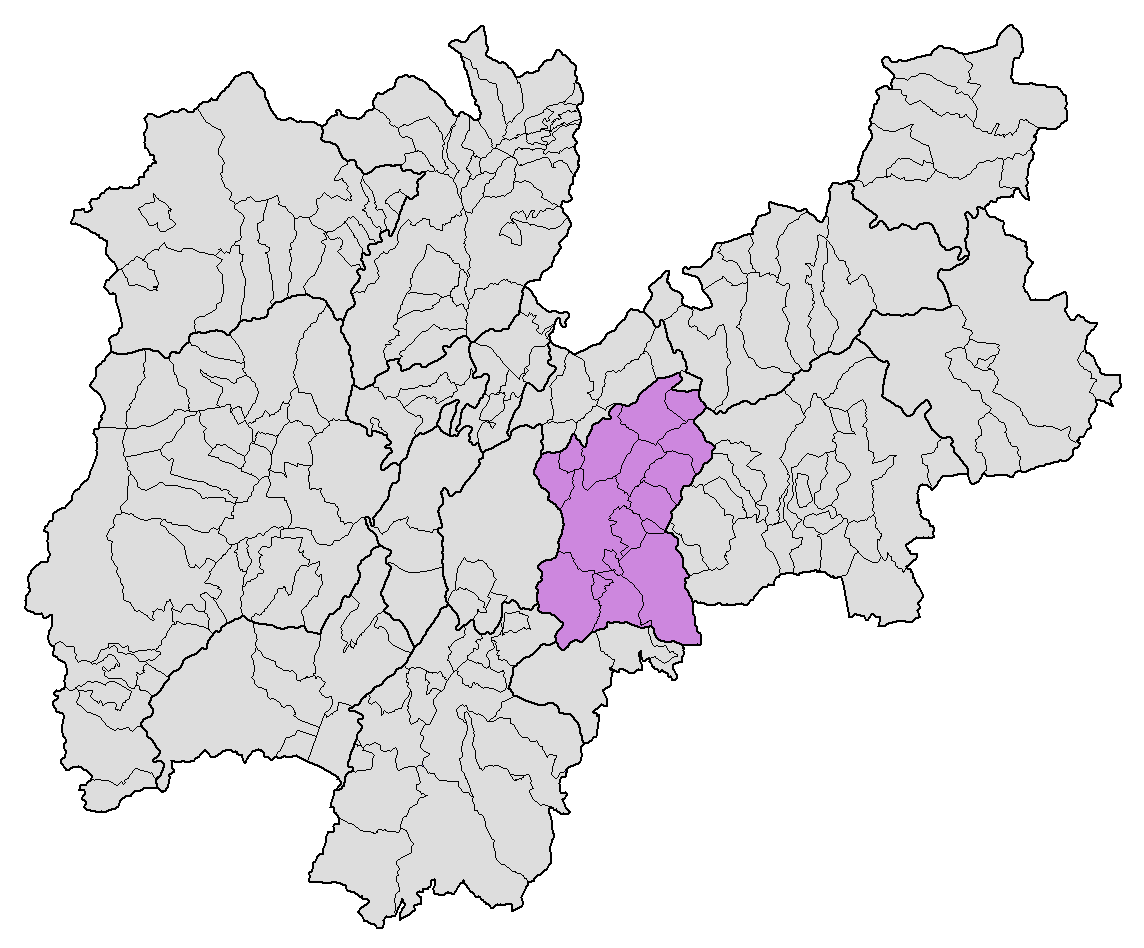
- Location of Alta Valsugana e Bersntol within Trentino.
- Country: Italy
- Autonomous region: Trentino-Alto Adige
- Autonomous province: Trentino (TN)
- Established: 2006
- Administrative seat: Pergine Valsugana
- Municipalities: 17

Government
  - President: Mauro Dallapiccola (Democratic Party)

Area
  - Total: 360.04 km^{2} (139.01 sq mi)

Population (2010)
  - Total: 52,162
  - Density: 144.88/km^{2} (375.23/sq mi)
- Code number: C4
- Website: http://www.comprensorioaltavalsugana.it/

Alta Valsugana e Bersntol (German: Hoch Suganertal und Fersental; Mocheno: Hoa Valzegu' ont Bersntol) is one of the sixteen districts of Trentino in the Italian region of Trentino-Alto Adige/Südtirol. Its administrative seat and major town is Pergine Valsugana.

== Overview ==
The territory consist more or less of the high part of Valsugana, from border of Trento municipality (west) to Novaledo (east), and all the Bersntol valley.

Alta Valsugana e Bersntol district borders west with Val d'Adige (15), south with Vallagarina (10) and with Altipiani Cimbri (12), east with Valsugana e Tesino (3) and north with Val di Fiemme and Valle di Cembra (5).

== Subdivisions ==
Comune	Population	Area (km^{2})	Height (m)
Baselga di Piné	4,899	40.84	964
Bedollo	1,478	27.46	1,059
Bosentino	814	4.66	688
Calceranica al Lago	1,278	3.37	465
Caldonazzo	3,344	21.46	480
Centa San Nicolò	626	11.27	830
Civezzano	3,909	15.52	469
Fierozzo	477	17.94	1,127
Fornace	1,323	7.24	740
Frassilongo	331	16,71	852
Levico Terme	7,474	62.88	506
Palù del Fersina	177	16.72	1,360
Pergine Valsugana	20,474	54.40	482
Sant'Orsola Terme	1,076	15.42	925
Tenna	983	3.15	569
Vattaro	1,144	8.30	689
Vignola-Falesina	154	12	984
Vigolo Vattaro	2,201	20.70	725

- (in Italian) Dati Provincia TN (Italian)
- (in Italian) Popolazione al 01-01-2010 (Italian)

== See also ==
- Valsugana
- Districts of Trentino-Alto Adige/Südtirol
