= Vallagarina (district) =

Coordinates: 45°52′N 11°02′E

- District
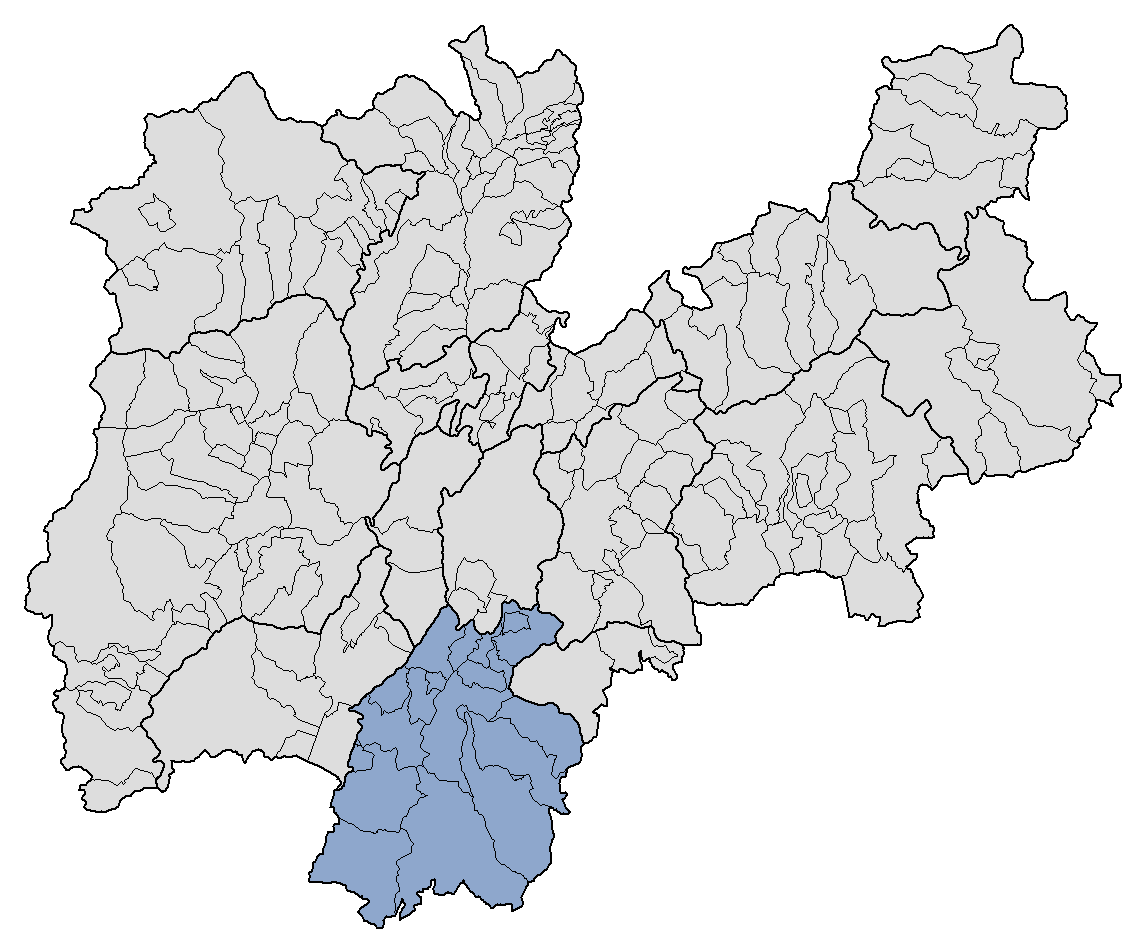
- Location of Vallagarina within Trentino.
- Country: Italy
- Autonomous region: Trentino-Alto Adige
- Autonomous province: Trentino (TN)
- Established: 2006
- Administrative seat: Rovereto
- Municipalities: 17

Government
  - President: Stefano Bisoffi

Area
  - Total: 694 km^{2} (268 sq mi)

Population (2007)
  - Total: 78,482
  - Density: 113/km^{2} (293/sq mi)
- Code number: C10
- Website: Official website

Vallagarina (German: Lagertal) is one of the sixteen districts of Trentino in the Italian region of Trentino-Alto Adige/Südtirol. Its administrative seat and major town is Rovereto.

== Overview ==
The territory was named after the valley of Lagarina. As with Trentino's other "valley communities", it was created by provincial law in 2006.

== Subdivisions ==
Vallagarina is composed of the following 17 municipalities:

- Ala
- Avio
- Besenello
- Brentonico
- Calliano
- Isera
- Mori
- Nogaredo
- Nomi
- Pomarolo
- Ronzo-Chienis
- Rovereto (district capital)
- Terragnolo
- Trambileno
- Vallarsa
- Villa Lagarina
- Volano
