= Val d'Adige (territory) =

- Territory
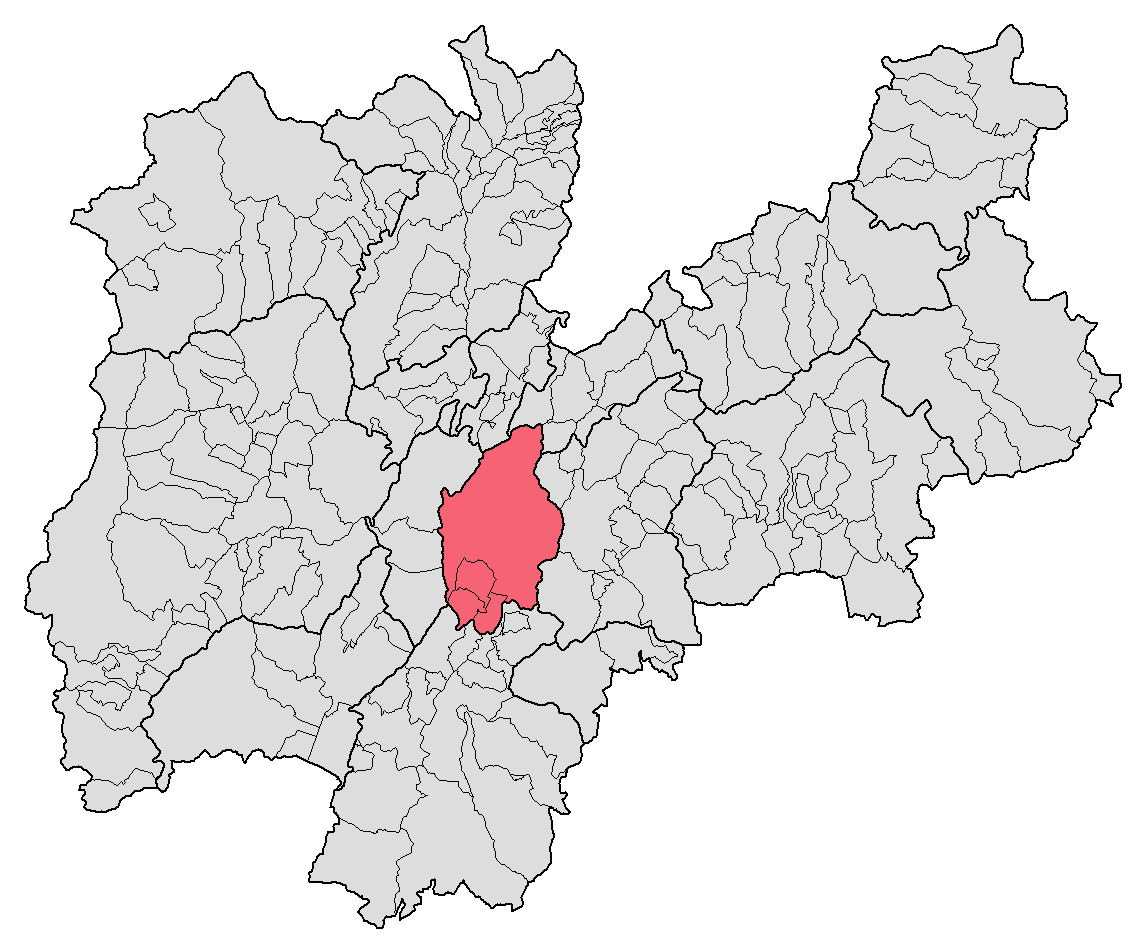
- Location of Val d'Adige within Trentino.
- Country: Italy
- Autonomous region: Trentino-Alto Adige
- Autonomous province: Trentino (TN)
- Established: 2006
- Administrative seat: none
- Municipalities: Trento; Aldeno; Cimone; Garniga Terme

Population (2007)
  - Total: 110,061
- Code number: C15

Val d'Adige (German: Etschtal) is one of the sixteen districts of Trentino in the Italian region of Trentino-Alto Adige/Südtirol. Unlike the other fifteen, it is a territory without an administrative seat. The major town part of its area is Trento.

== Overview ==
The territory was named after the alpine valley of the Adige and succeeds the old and homonym district. As the other Valley Communities, it was created in 2006 with a provincial law, when the old ones were abolished. The four municipalities composing it perform their community functions associated by a convention.

== Subdivisions ==
Val d'Adige territory is composed by the following 4 municipalities:

- Trento
- Aldeno
- Cimone
- Garniga Terme
