= Luserna =

Luserna Lusérn
- Comune
- Kamou vo Lusérn; Gemeinde von Lusern; Comune di Luserna
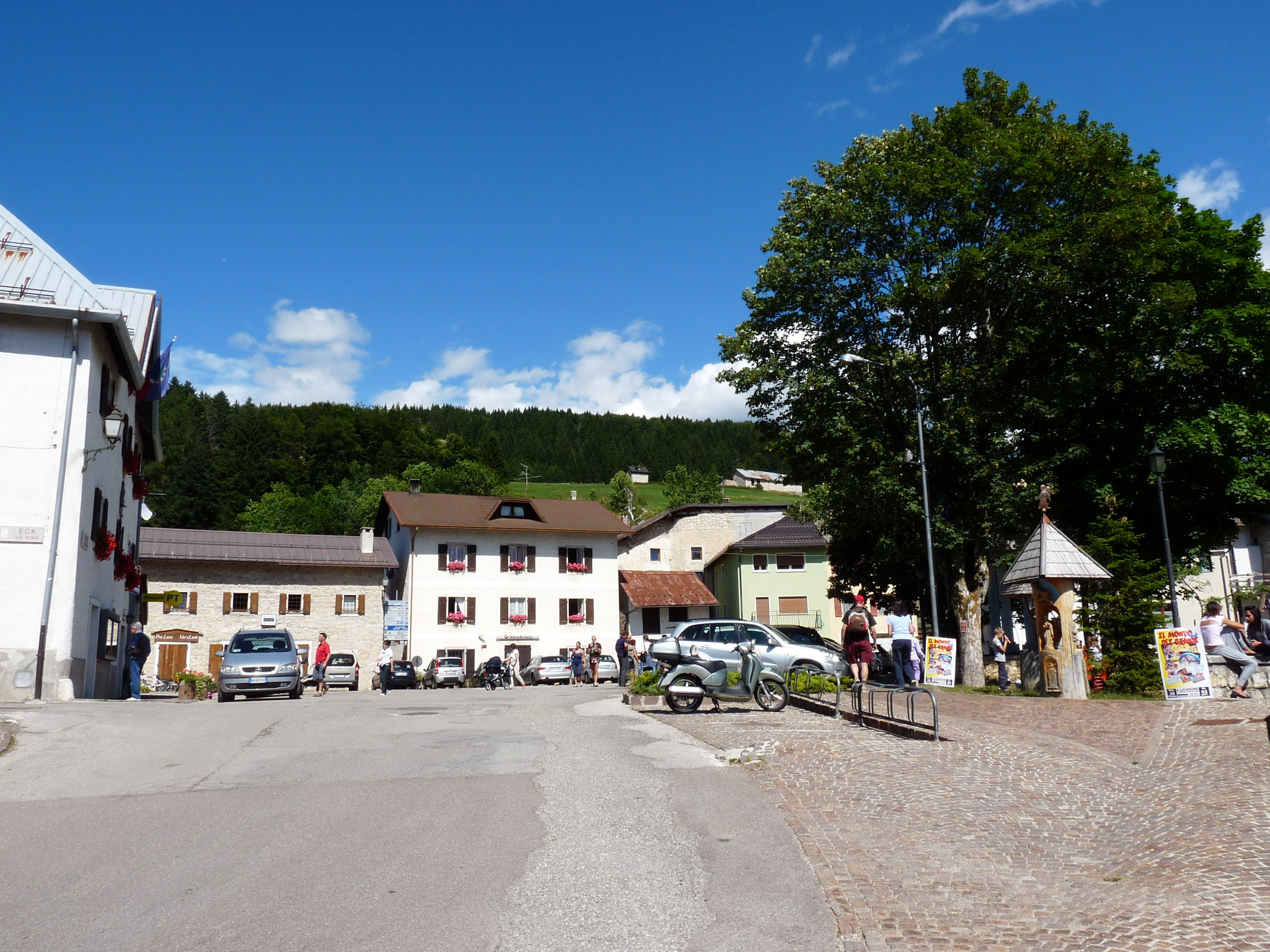
- Square in Lusérn

- Coat of arms

- Location within Italy Location within Trentino-Alto Adige/Südtirol
- Coordinates: 45°55′N 11°19′E
- Country: Italy
- Region: Trentino-Alto Adige/Südtirol
- Province: Trentino (TN)

Government
  - Mayor: Nerio Giovanazzi (Special Commissioner)

Area
  - Total: 8.2 km^{2} (3.2 sq mi)
- Elevation: 1,333 m (4,373 ft)

Population (2026)
  - Total: 263
  - Density: 32/km^{2} (83/sq mi)
- Time zone: UTC+1 (CET)
  - Summer (DST): UTC+2 (CEST)
- Postal code: 38040
- Dialing code: 0464
- Website: Official website

Luserna (Cimbrian: Lusérn, German: Lusern) is a comune (municipality) in Trentino in the northern Italian region Trentino-Alto Adige/Südtirol, located about 40 kilometres (25 mi) southeast of Trento. As of 2021, it had a population of 271 and an area of 8.2 square kilometres (3.2 mi^{2}).

Luserna is part of the Magnificent Community of the Cimbrian Highlands (Altipiani Cimbri) together with the municipalities of Lavarone and Folgaria. In the tourist sphere it is part of the Alpe Cimbra. It is one of I Borghi più belli d'Italia ("The most beautiful villages of Italy").

Lusérn borders the following municipalities: Caldonazzo, Lavarone, Levico Terme, Pedemonte, Rotzo and Valdastico.

== Cimbrian culture and language ==
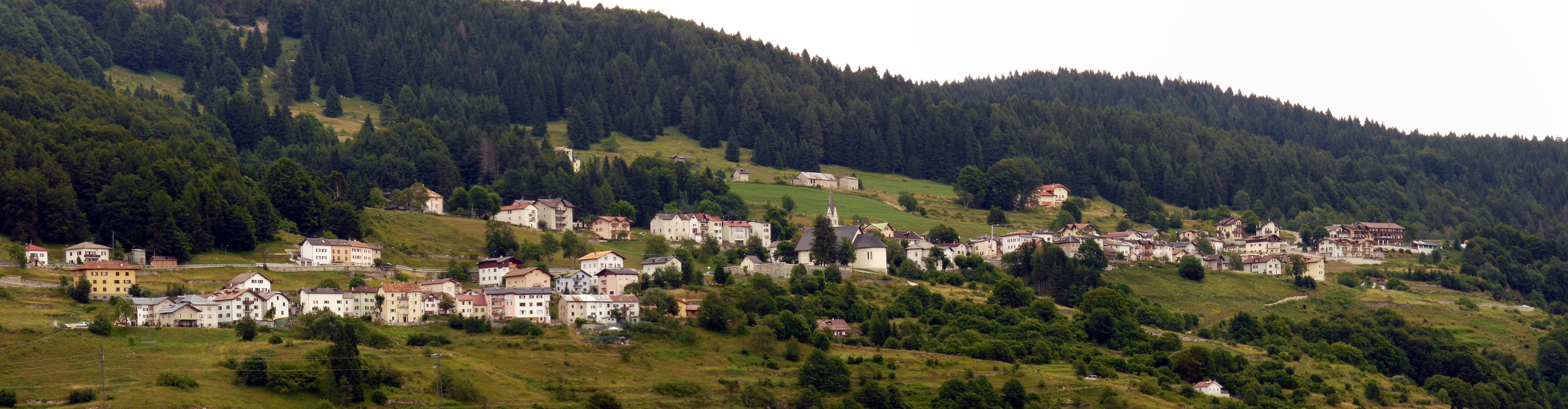
Luserna seen from Forte Belvedere Gschwent

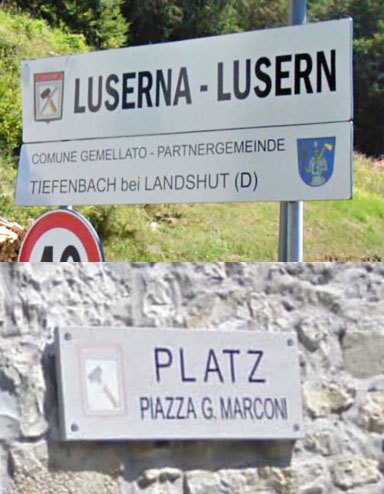
Bilingual signs in both Italian and German

Lusérn is the centre of Cimbrian language and culture. In the 2021 census, around 68.8% of the people of Lusérn stated Cimbrian, an Upper German dialect of the Germanic language, to be their first language.

The Cimbrian spoken in Lusérn is a slightly different dialect from Cimbrian spoken elsewhere.

Cimbrian	German	English
Lusérn iz a khlummaz lånt vo perge, obar in Astetal. 'Z iz daz lest lånt, boma no redet azpe biar.	Lusern ist ein kleines Bergdorf, oberhalb des Val d'Astico. Es ist das letzte Dorf, in dem Zimbrisch gesprochen wird (als wie wir).	Luserna is a small mountain-village overlooking the Val d'Astico. It is the last village where Cimbrian is spoken the way we do.

== Point of interest ==
The village of Luserna has seven restaurants and one little hotel, four museums (one of them is an old Austrian's Fortress) and four thematic trails that tell Cimbrian legends and stories. They are passable by families and mountain bikes, and in winter they become paths suitable for snowshoeing.

== History ==
Luserna was founded around the year 1400 from Bavarians populations coming from nearby Lavarone who decided to stay and live here. In 1780 Luserna became independent from Lavarone. Until 1918 it was included in the Austro-Hungarian Empire, precisely in the County of Tyrol. During the last years of the 1800s it became famous for its tradition of bobbin lace and thanks to the Austrian administration, it had both German and Italian schools.

After the annexation to the Kingdom of Italy and with the advent of fascism, the people of Luserna were forbidden to speak Cimbro. This is because one of the dogmas of fascism was to Italianize every village and culture. This caused the phenomenon of the Options, an agreement between the Third Reich and the Kingdom of Italy to distribute the Mochen, Cimbrian and German populations who had lived for millennia in the ancient county of Tyrol, which later became the region of Venice Tridentine.

After the Second World War, thanks to the Gruber–De Gasperi Agreement, the Cimbrian linguistic minority of Luserna became part of the autonomy basis of the Autonomous Province of Trento and the Trentino - South Tyrol Region. In 1987 the Mocheno Cimbro Institute was founded and in 2001 the Cimbrian language was officially recognized within the regulations for the protection of Trentino linguistic minorities. In 2008, provincial legislation was implemented to protect the Ladin, Mochena and Cimbrian linguistic minorities settled in the Autonomous Province of Trento. Thanks to it, the Cimbrian community of Luserna now enjoys one of the most complete regulations in Europe.

== Demographic evolution ==
Historical population

Year	Pop.	±%
1921	906	—
1931	846	−6.6%
1936	725	−14.3%
1951	640	−11.7%

Year	Pop.	±%
1961	642	+0.3%
1971	561	−12.6%
1981	456	−18.7%
1991	386	−15.4%

Year	Pop.	±%
2001	297	−23.1%
2011	267	−10.1%
2021	270	+1.1%

Source: Data from ISTAT
