= Felice Fontana =

Italian physicist

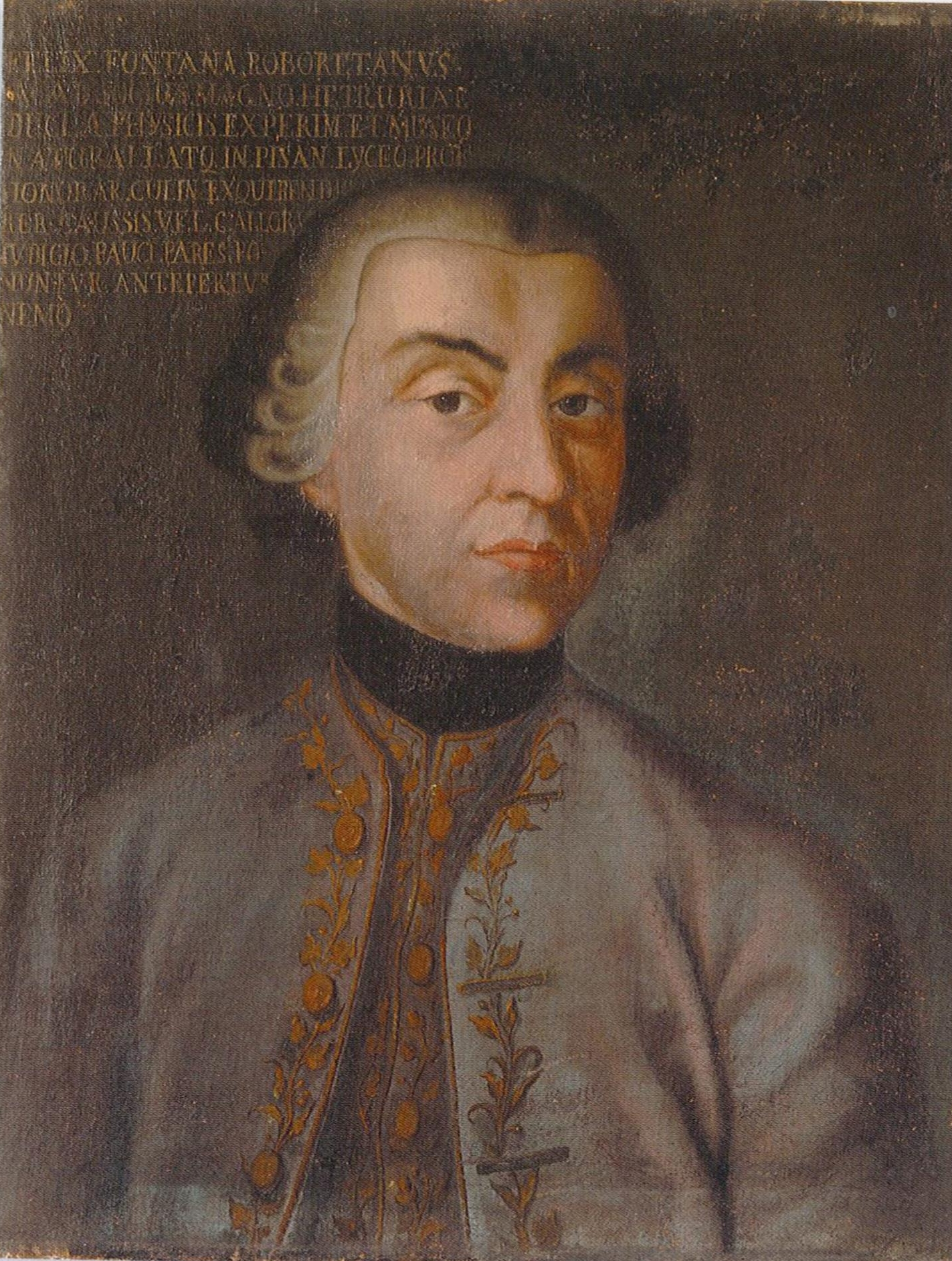
Painting of Fontana in 1775 by Clementino Vannetti (1754-1795)

Abbé Gasparo Ferdinando Felice Fontana (15 April 1730 – 9 March 1805) was an Italian polymath who contributed to experimental studies in physiology, toxicology, and physics. As a physicist he discovered the water gas shift reaction in 1780. He investigated the human eye and has also been credited with discovering the nucleolus of a cell. His work on the venom of vipers was among the earliest experimental toxicological studies. He served as a court physicist for Peter Leopold, Duke of Tuscany and taught at the University of Pisa. He was involved in the establishment of the La Specola museum in Florence.

== Biography ==
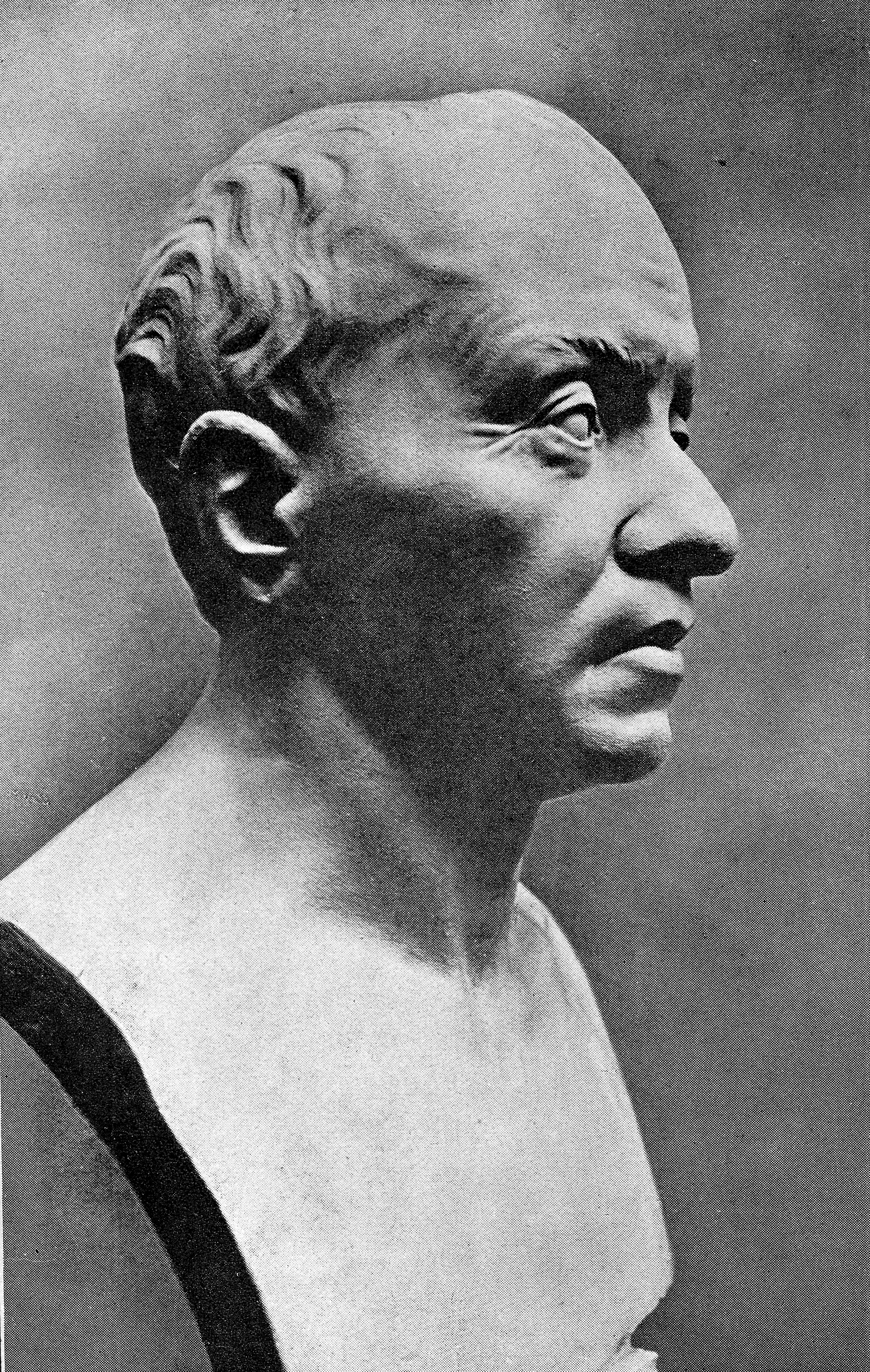
Bust of Fontana in the Florence natural history museum

Fontana was born at Casa Fontana, Pomarolo, Val Lagarina, the third son of jurist Pietro and his wife Elena Caterina Ienetti. He was baptized on 3 June 1730. When his father moved to Villa Lagarina, Fontana studied in Rovereto under Girolamo Tartarotti and Giambattista Graser. He then travelled to listen to lectures including those of the anatomist G. B. Morgagni in Padua. In Parma, around 1749-50, he studied under Jacopo Belgrado. In 1753, he was a founding member of the Accademia degli Agiati in Rovereto. In 1755, his older brother Giovanni Pietro, a priest died, leaving half of his wealth and inheritance to Felice if he took up a religious position. Fontana then became an abbot but did not get ordained. studied Anatomy and Physiology in the University of Padua.

He became a tutor to Melchiorre Partini in 1755. Partini was the nephew of Gian Carlo Partini ( 1705-65). Although Partini was only a few months younger than Fontana, this tutorship lasted nearly a decade and led to a move to Florence. Fontana also became a member of the Istituto Marsiliano delle Scienze when he moved to Bologna and here he interacted with many of the scientists of the period. Around 1755-57 he collaborated with Leopoldo Marco Antonio Caldani on experiments to examine the concept of Hallerian irritability. In this enquiry, he found that the iris contraction response to light in one eye also forced the iris on the other eye to simultaneously contract even when light was not applied to it. He also noticed the refractory period involved in heart muscles. He moved to Tuscany in 1758 to study mathematics under Paolo Frisi. He then went to Pisa where recommendations from his mathematician brother Gregorio and Carlo Firmian led to a formal position as chair of logic in 1765. While in Pisa he examined red blood cells under a microscope, and made studies on the eye, ear and other organs apart from studies on the sterility of mules, and in analytical calculus. In 1766 he was made professor of physics at Pisa. He began to examine the rust of wheat Puccinia graminis and published in 1767. The same year he began to write on the results of his studies on viper venom which he began after reading the work of Richard Mead. He examined if alkalis were cures for viper venom as had been claimed in his time. Among his 6000 experiments with 3000 vipers and 4000 test animals, he tested twelve animals, six of which he maintained as controls (not given the alkali treatment) and concluded that the treatment was ineffective or even possibly worse than none. His microscopic works also examined death, torpor, and revival in rotifers and other microscopic animals.

Around 1771-73, he was involved in helping found the museum La Specola, in Florence. The work took a toll on his health and he was granted permission by the Grand Duke to travel to France and England. Among the works that he helped produce in the museum were nearly 3000 anatomical wax models of humans. In 1792, he was elected a foreign member of the Royal Swedish Academy of Sciences.

He suffered from a stroke on 11 February 1805 and died a month later. He was buried in the Church of Santa Croce.

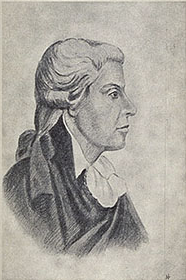
Felice Fontana.

== Travels (1775-1780) ==
From 1775 to 1780 he travelled through Europe. Already in 1775, he published a treatise, 'Ricerche fisiche sopra l'aria fissa', on Carbon dioxide (opposing to, among others, the theory of Torbern Bergman that it was acid in itself) and 1779-1780 sees his seminal research on curare. In 1779 he offered the London Royal Society two memories on chemistry: 'Experiments and observations on the inflammable air breathed by various animals', where he denied that flammable air was fit for breathing, in accordance with Joseph Priestley, and 'Account of the airs extracted from different kinds of water; with thoughts on the salubrity of air at different places'. In 1780 he produced carbon monoxide and hydrogen by passing steam over hot coal. The resulting gas from this so-called Water-gas shift reaction burned with a blue flame and was termed "blue water gas." In 1783, he was elected a member of the American Philosophical Society in Philadelphia.

== General Principles of Solidity and Fluidity of Bodies ==
In his studies of gases, Fontana took an interest in the measurement of volumes. In 1770, he developed a recording barometer. In 1783, he published Principi generali della solidità e della fluidità dé corpi, expounding a theory on material states of his own: he thought that matter was subject to two newtonian forces, an attractive and an expansive one. The latter, though, wasn't as repulsive as Newton thought, but the result of a combination of simple matter (solid in its natural state) with "heat matter" that drove apart molecules, turning bodies into fluids and vapours. In the case of gases that never became liquid in the absence of heat, he considered the interference of another principle: the "flogisto", principle of fluidity and flammability.

== Works ==
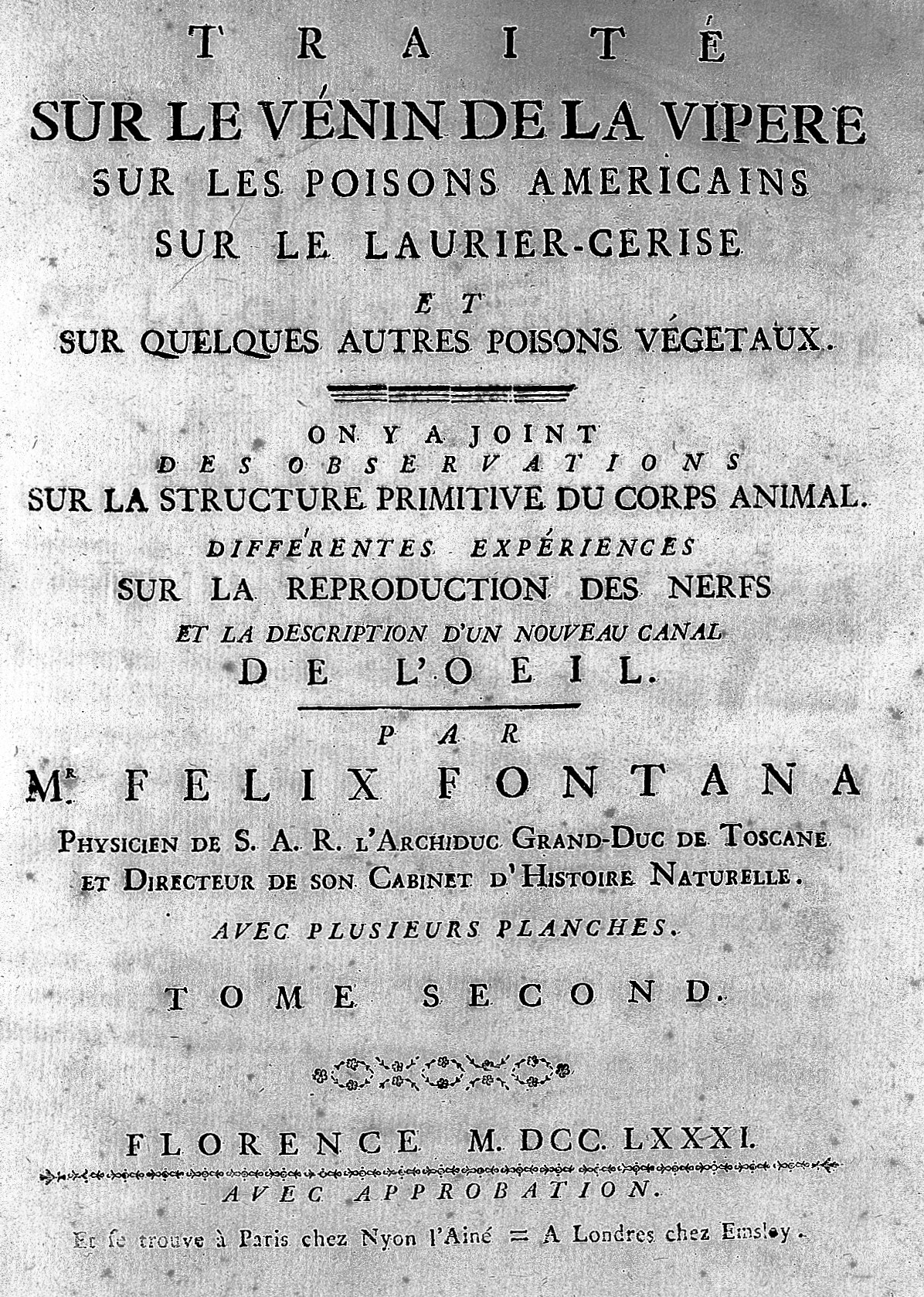
Traité sur le vénin de la vipere, sur les poisons americains

- Dei moti dell'iride (Lucca, 1765);
- Nuove osservazioni sopra i globetti rossi del sangue (1766);
- De irritabilitatis legibus... (1767);
- Osservazioni sopra la ruggine del grano (1767);
- Ricerche fisiche sopra il veleno della vipera (Lucca, 1767);
- Descrizione ed uso di alcuni stromenti per misurare la salubrità dell'aria (Firenze, 1775);
- Ricerche fisiche sopra l'aria fissa (Firenze, 1775);
- Ricerche filosofiche sopra la fisica animale (in Latin). Firenze: Gaetano Cambiagi. 1775.
- Recherches physiques sur la nature de l'air nitreux et de l'air déphlogistiqué (Paris, 1776);
- Opuscoli scientifici (Firenze, 1783).
- Trattato del veleno della vipera de' veleni americani (in Italian). Vol. 1. Napoli: Nuova Società Letteraria e Tipografica. 1787.
  - Trattato del veleno della vipera de' veleni americani (in Italian). Vol. 2. Napoli: Nuova Società Letteraria e Tipografica. 1787.
  - Trattato del veleno della vipera de' veleni americani (in Italian). Vol. 3. Napoli: Nuova Società Letteraria e Tipografica. 1787.
  - Trattato del veleno della vipera de' veleni americani (in Italian). Vol. 4. Napoli: Nuova Società Letteraria e Tipografica. 1787.
