= Districts of Trentino-Alto Adige/Südtirol =

The Districts of Trentino-Alto Adige/Südtirol are a subdivision of the two Italian autonomous provinces of Trento (Trentino) and Bolzano (South Tyrol). They were established by a decree of the President of Italy (Nr. 987) on 10 June 1955.

In South Tyrol their name is Comunità comprensoriale or Comprensorio (in Italian), Bezirksgemeinschaft (in German), Cumunità raion or Comunitè comprensoriala (in Ladin). In Trentino is Comunità di valle (in Italian) and Talgemeinschaft (in German).

== South Tyrol ==
South Tyrol is composed by 8 Comprensori/Bezirksgemeinschaften. One of them, Bolzano, is urban and composed only by the city. The city is also the seat of Salten-Schlern, but not part of its territory.

Map of South Tyrol with its eight districts.

#	Name	Municipalities	Area (km^{2})	Inhabitants	Capital	Map
1	Bozen (Bolzano)	1	52	103,135	Bozen (Bolzano)	
2	Burggrafenamt (Burgraviato)	26	1,101	97,315	Meran (Merano)	
3	Pustertal (Val Pusteria)	26	2,071	79,086	Bruneck (Brunico)	
4	Überetsch-Unterland (Oltradige-Bassa Atesina)	18	424	71,435	Neumarkt (Egna)	
5	Eisacktal (Valle Isarco)	13	624	49,840	Brixen (Bressanone)	
6	Salten-Schlern (Salto-Sciliar)	13	1,037	48,020	Bozen (Bolzano)	
7	Vinschgau (Val Venosta)	13	1,442	19,124	Schlanders (Silandro)	
8	Wipptal (Alta Valle Isarco)	6	650	18,220	Sterzing (Vipiteno)	

== Trentino ==
Until 16 June 2006, Trentino was divided into 11 Comprensori/Bezirksgemeinschaften, abolished with a provincial law and substituted by 16 valley communities. One of them, Val d'Adige, is a territory composed by Trento and other 3 municipalities, without a capital.

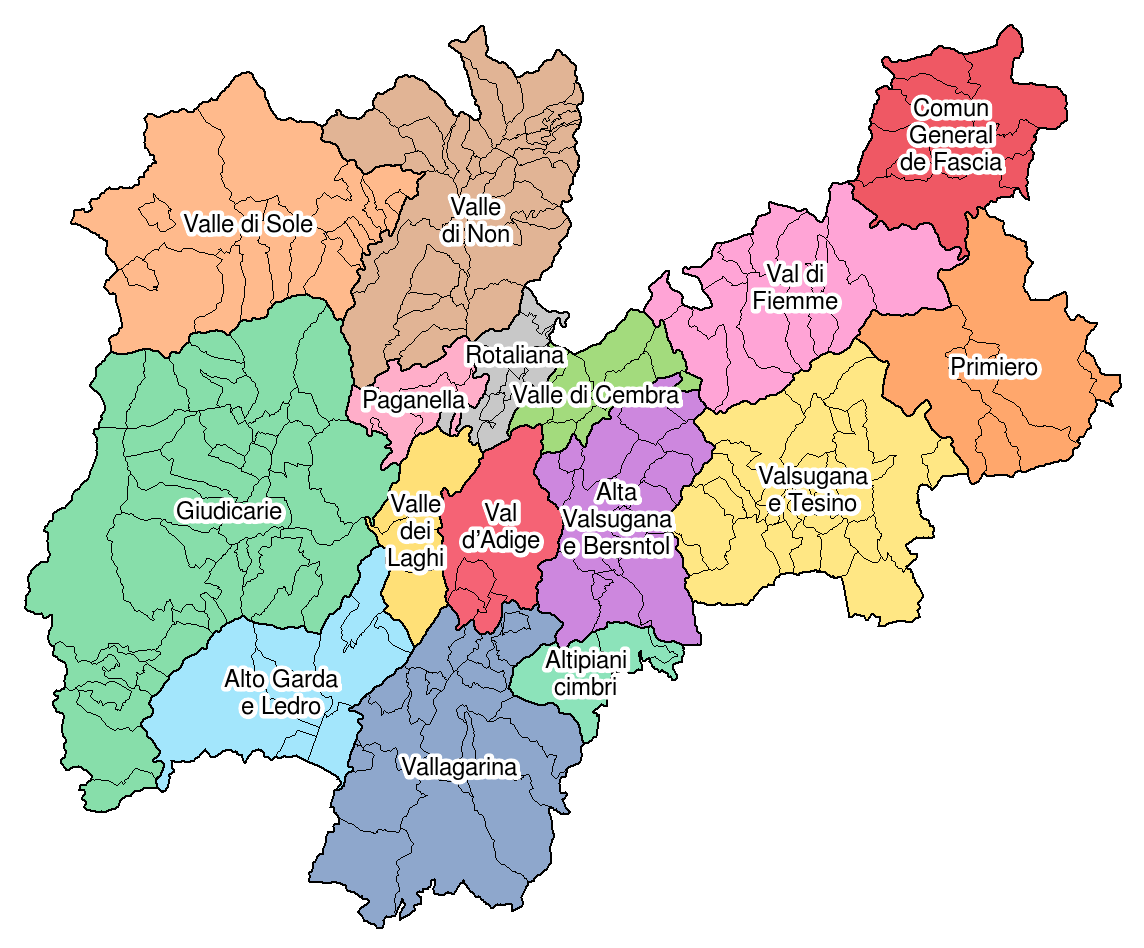
Map of Trentino with its 16 new districts, established in 2006

Map of Trentino with its 11 districts, abolished in 2006

#	Name	Municipalities	Area (km^{2})	Inhabitants	Capital	Map
1	Comunità territoriale della Val di Fiemme	11	415	18,567	Cavalese	
2	Comunità di Primiero	8	413	9,836	Tonadico	
3	Comunità Valsugana e Tesino	21	578.88	25,694	Borgo Valsugana	
4	Comunità Alta Valsugana e Bersntol	18	360.04	45,228	Pergine Valsugana	
5	Comunità della Valle di Cembra	11	135	10,854	Faver	
6	Comunità della Val di Non	38	596	37,143	Cles	
7	Comunità della Valle di Sole	14	609.36	15,020	Malè	
8	Comunità delle Giudicarie	39	1,176.51	35,647	Tione di Trento	
9	Comunità Alto Garda e Ledro	7	353.33	42,955	Riva del Garda	
10	Comunità della Vallagarina	17	694	78,482	Rovereto	
11	Comun General de Fascia	7	318	9,195	Pozza di Fassa	
12	Magnifica Comunità degli Altipiani Cimbri	3	106.17	4,442	Lavarone	
13	Comunità Rotaliana-Königsberg	8	94.62	25,953	Mezzocorona	
14	Comunità della Paganella	5	97.3	4,731	Andalo	
15	Val d'Adige territory	4	188.97	110,061	none	
16	Comunità della Valle dei Laghi	6	139.65	9,349	Vezzano	

The older 11 district were: Val di Fiemme, Primiero, Bassa Valsugana e Tesino, Alta Valsugana, Val d'Adige, Val di Non, Val di Sole, Giudicarie, Alto Garda e Ledro, Vallagarina, Ladino di Fassa.
