= Laghi =

Laghi is an Italian word meaning lakes and thus features in numerous toponyms. It may also refer to:

== People ==
- Pio Laghi (1922–2009), Italian cardinal
- Renato Laghi (born 1944), Italian racing cyclist

== Places ==
- Laghi, Veneto, village in the province of Vicenza in north-eastern Italy

== See also ==
- Valle dei Laghi
