= Fascia (disambiguation) =

Fascia, commonly mis-spelled "facia", is a layer of connective tissue in the human body.

Fascia may also refer to:

- Fascia, Liguria, a comune in the Province of Genoa, Italy
- Cima della Fascia, a mountain of the Ligurian Alps, in Italy
- Fascia (district)
- Fascia (architecture), a long, horizontal surface across the top of a structure
- Fascia (car), a dashboard of a car; or the front and rear ends of a car
- Fascia (phone), a removable mobile phone housing
- Fascia (sash), a sash worn higher than the waist by Roman Catholic clerics
- Fascia, a transverse band of a different color on insect anatomy
- FASCIA (database), a U.S. National Security Agency database

== See also ==
- Fasces
- Fascio
- Facia Group, a company founded by Stephen Hinchliffe
