= Lake Lamar =

Alpine lake in Trentino, Italy

Lago di Lamar
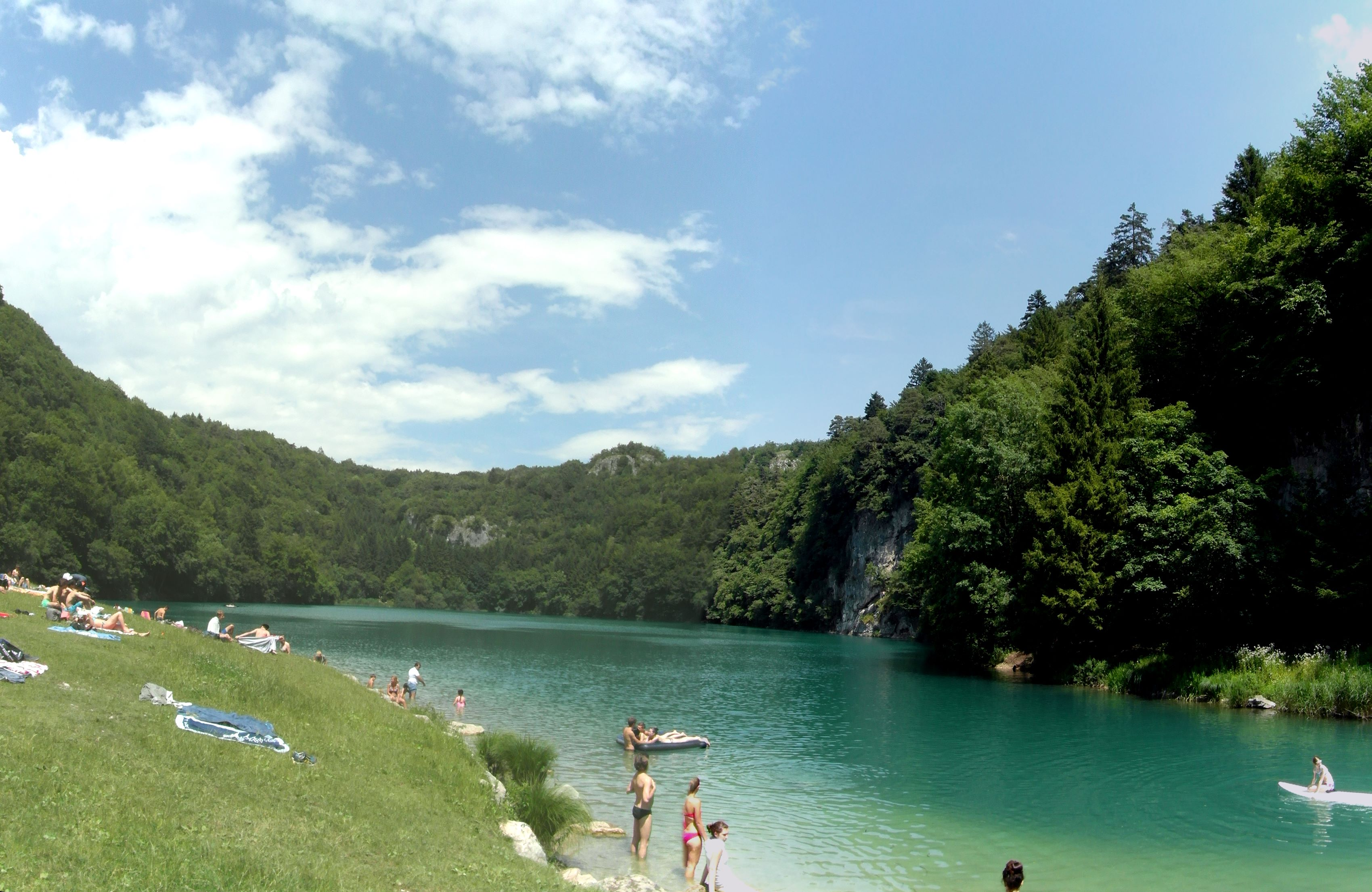
- Lago di Lamar during the summer season
- Location: Trentino-Alto Adige, Italy
- Coordinates: 46.1304°N 11.0633°E
- Primary inflows: underground
- Surface area: 0.045 square kilometres (0.017 sq mi)
- Average depth: 4 metres (13 ft)
- Frozen: never

Location
- Interactive map of Lago di Lamar

The Lago di Lamar is an alpine lake in the Valle dei Laghi, in southwestern Trentino, Italy, located at 750/800 meters above sea level. It is situated between the northern slopes of Monte Soprasasso, which separate it from the underlying Adige Valley (to which its hydrographic basin belongs) to the east, and the Paganella, to the west. Due to its position, it can be attributed both to the Valle dei Laghi, due to geographical proximity, and to the Adige Valley basin.

== How to reach ==
From Trento, along the state road of the Valle dei Laghi (SS45Bis) towards Riva del Garda, turn after Cadine towards Terlago and continue to Monte Terlago, beyond there is Lago di Lamar.

== Description ==
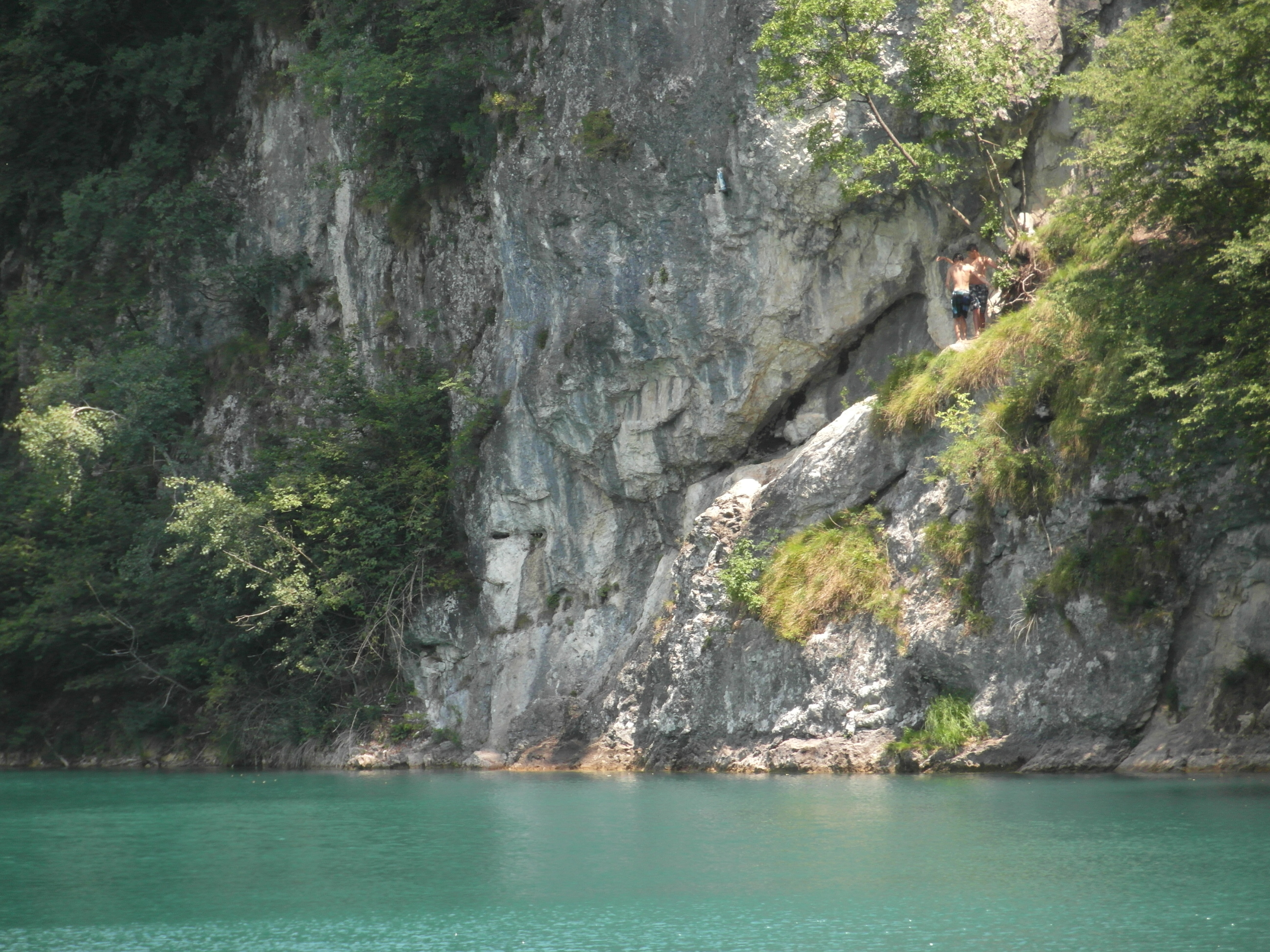
The cliff where diving is possible

It covers an area of 45,000 square meters, has no significant inflows or outflows but only small streams, and, likely, submerged springs. Nearby is Lago Santo. It has an average depth of about 4 meters in the northern part, while the southern part has a bathing area with water about 1–2 meters deep. There is presence of fauna; among other species, the crayfish Austropotamobius pallipes can be observed.

On the southern shore, about thirty meters above the lake's surface, lies the Abisso di Lamar, a deep cave linked to the karst system that characterizes the entire area.
