= Garniga Terme =

Comune in Trentino-Alto Adige/Südtirol, Italy

- Comune
- Comune di Garniga Terme
- Location within Italy Location within Trentino-Alto Adige/Südtirol
- Coordinates: 46°0′N 11°5′E
- Country: Italy
- Region: Trentino-Alto Adige/Südtirol
- Province: Trentino (TN)

Government
  - Mayor: Valerio Linardi

Area
  - Total: 13.1 km^{2} (5.1 sq mi)

Population (2026)
  - Total: 427
  - Density: 32.6/km^{2} (84.4/sq mi)
- Time zone: UTC+1 (CET)
  - Summer (DST): UTC+2 (CEST)
- Postal code: 38060
- Dialing code: 0461
- Website: Official website

Garniga Terme (Garniga in local dialect, German: Garnich) is a comune (municipality) in Trentino in the northern Italian region Trentino-Alto Adige/Südtirol, located about 8 kilometres (5 mi) southwest of Trento. As of 31 December 2004, it had a population of 364 and an area of 13.1 square kilometres (5.1 mi^{2}).

Garniga Terme borders the following municipalities: Trento, Cimone and Aldeno.

== Demographic evolution ==
Historical population

Year	Pop.	±%
1861	?	—
1871	?	—
1881	?	—
1901	?	—
1911	?	—

Year	Pop.	±%
1921	612	—
1931	483	−21.1%
1936	451	−6.6%
1951	452	+0.2%
1961	436	−3.5%

Year	Pop.	±%
1971	438	+0.5%
1981	377	−13.9%
1991	403	+6.9%
2001	384	−4.7%

Source: Data from ISTAT
