= Rotaliana-Königsberg =

- Territory
- Interactive map of Rotaliana-Königsberg
- Coordinates: 46°12′N 11°07′E
- Country: Italy
- Autonomous region: Trentino-Alto Adige
- Autonomous province: Trentino (TN)
- Established: 2006

Rotaliana-Königsberg is one of the sixteen districts of Trentino in the Italian region of Trentino-Alto Adige/Südtirol.
