= Alto Garda e Ledro =

- Territory
- Interactive map of Alto Garda e Ledro
- Coordinates: 45°53′26″N 10°50′32″E
- Country: Italy
- Autonomous region: Trentino-Alto Adige
- Autonomous province: Trentino (TN)
- Established: 2006

Alto Garda e Ledro is one of the sixteen districts of Trentino in the Italian region of Trentino-Alto Adige/Südtirol.
