= Pomarolo =

- Comune
- Comune di Pomarolo
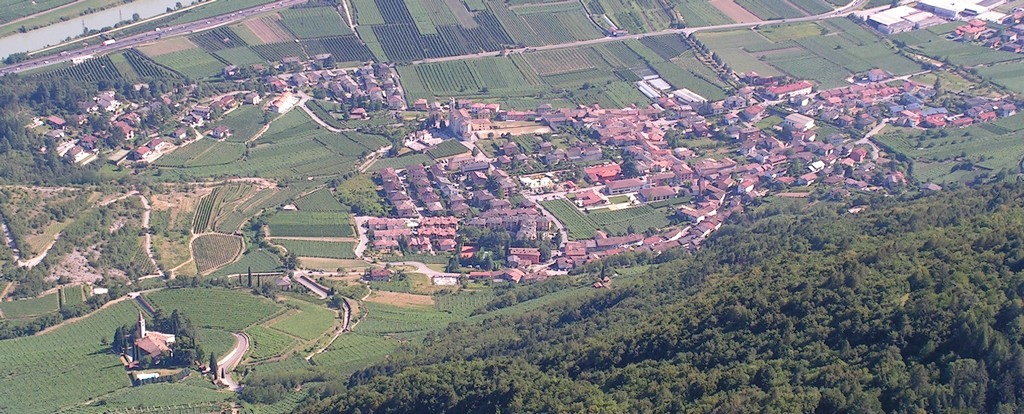

- Location within Italy Location within Trentino-Alto Adige/Südtirol
- Coordinates: 45°56′N 11°3′E
- Country: Italy
- Region: Trentino-Alto Adige/Südtirol
- Province: Trentino (TN)
- Frazioni: Chiusole, Savignano

Government
  - Mayor: Massimo Fasanelli

Area
  - Total: 9.3 km^{2} (3.6 sq mi)

Population (Dec. 2004)
  - Total: 2,264
  - Density: 240/km^{2} (630/sq mi)
- Demonym: Pomarolesi
- Time zone: UTC+1 (CET)
  - Summer (DST): UTC+2 (CEST)
- Postal code: 38060
- Dialing code: 0464
- Website: Official website

Pomarolo (Pomaròl in local dialect) is a comune (municipality) in Trentino located around 15 kilometres (9 mi) southwest of Trento in the northern Italian region of Trentino-Alto Adige/Südtirol.

== Overview ==
The municipality of Pomarolo contains the subdivisions Chiusole and Savignano. Pomarolo borders the cities of Cimone, Aldeno, Villa Lagarina, Nomi, Volano, and Rovereto. Pomarolo is a community in the province of Trento which sits near the Adige river and at the foot of Mt Cimana. Cabernet, Merlot, Sauvignon blanc and Schiava vineyards are prevalent in the surrounding area, as are fruit orchards. On the Eastern side of the village there are the ancient remains of the Castel Barco, which still dominates Vallagarina. The town boasts an agricultural base dating back to antiquity, being a "fundus" of Roman origin. In antiquity, as today, fruit trees and vines constituted the main agricultural production. In the 15th century, during the Venetian rule of the area, Pomarolo as in the rest of Vallagarina mulberry was cultivated until the mid-1950s. The area surrounding Pomarolo is well known for its truffle fungi, particularly Savignano.

== Etymology ==
The name stems from the Vulgar Latin word "pomarium" meaning fruit orchard.

== Coat of arms ==
The town coat of arms was formalised on September 1, 1980, and was derived from 18th century seals. It depicts an apple orchard with golden fruits, with a silver background and red fields. The motto, "Ex fructibus arbos" alludes to the town name, this is also found on the church of San Cristoforo's apse, dating from the 18th century. Pomarolo's ancient inhabitants chose S. Cristoforo as patron and protector against natural calamities.

== History ==
A road at the right of the river Adige cuts through the old village has always been the main thoroughfare. Pomarolo was the capital town in Vallagarina both in Roman and High Medieval periods.

Lothar III, German king and Holy Roman emperor, destroyed it in 1136. During Roman rule, Pomarolo was the “Comun Comunale”, which manages administration, regulations, public order, agriculture, upkeep of infrastructure and the management of Pomarolo' surrounding towns.

Castel Barco provided the military presence in the area by lodging a garrison there. Pomarolo is also the birthplace of the eponymous noble family that had a great role in local and Trentino history. Taken over in the 15th century, The Castel Barco was destroyed by Emperor Maximilian I during the Venetian Republic invasion of 1508.

In 1330 a hospice for pilgrims was annexed to the San Antonio church, but was later converted to hospital, then retreat for monks.

== Notable people ==
- Felice Fontana
- Gregorio Fontana

== Demographic evolution ==
Historical population

Year	Pop.	±%
1861	?	—
1871	?	—
1881	?	—
1901	?	—
1911	?	—

Year	Pop.	±%
1921	1,349	—
1931	1,332	−1.3%
1936	1,203	−9.7%
1951	1,360	+13.1%
1961	1,293	−4.9%

Year	Pop.	±%
1971	1,290	−0.2%
1981	1,647	+27.7%
1991	2,010	+22.0%
2001	2,125	+5.7%

Source: Data from ISTAT
