= Cimone =

- Comune
- Comune di Cimone
- Coat of arms

- Location within Italy Location within Trentino-Alto Adige/Südtirol
- Coordinates: 45°59′N 11°4′E
- Country: Italy
- Region: Trentino-Alto Adige/Südtirol
- Province: Trentino (TN)

Government
  - Mayor: Damiano Bisesti

Area
  - Total: 9.8 km^{2} (3.8 sq mi)

Population (2026)
  - Total: 743
  - Density: 76/km^{2} (200/sq mi)
- Time zone: UTC+1 (CET)
  - Summer (DST): UTC+2 (CEST)
- Postal code: 38060
- Dialing code: 0461
- Website: Official website

Cimone (Zimón in local dialect) is a comune (municipality) in Trentino in the northern Italian region Trentino-Alto Adige/Südtirol, located about 10 kilometres (6 mi) southwest of Trento. As of 31 December 2004, it had a population of 599 and an area of 9.8 square kilometres (3.8 mi^{2}).

Cimone borders the following municipalities: Trento, Garniga Terme, Cavedine, Aldeno, Villa Lagarina, and Pomarolo.

== Demographic evolution ==
Historical population

Year	Pop.	±%
1861	?	—
1871	?	—
1881	?	—
1901	?	—
1911	?	—

Year	Pop.	±%
1921	931	—
1931	972	+4.4%
1936	934	−3.9%
1951	877	−6.1%
1961	784	−10.6%

Year	Pop.	±%
1971	675	−13.9%
1981	559	−17.2%
1991	506	−9.5%
2001	578	+14.2%

Source: Data from ISTAT
