= Val di Non (district) =

- Territory
- Location within Trentino-Alto Adige/Südtirol
- Country: Italy
- Autonomous region: Trentino-Alto Adige
- Autonomous province: Trentino (TN)
- Established: 2006

Val di Non is one of the 16 districts of Trentino in the Italian region of Trentino-Alto Adige/Südtirol.
