= Wipptal (district) =

District in Northern Italy

Coordinates: 46°53′46″N 11°25′55″E

Wipp Valley
- District
- Comunità comprensoriale Alta Valle Isarco; Bezirksgemeinschaft Wipptal
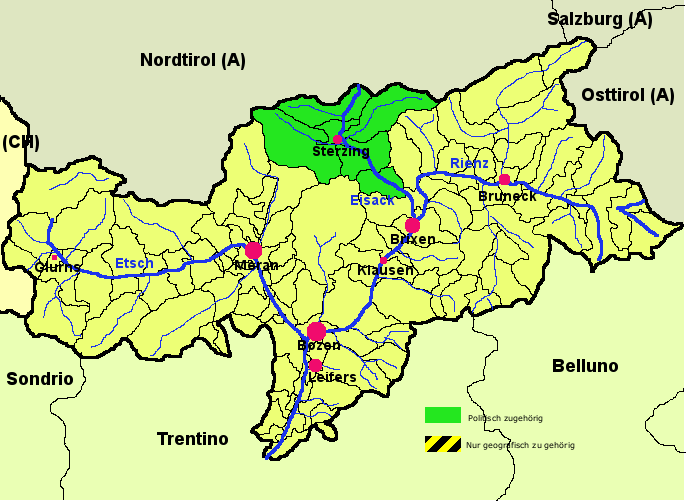
- Wipptal district (highlighted in green) within South Tyrol
- Country: Italy
- Autonomous region: Trentino-Alto Adige
- Autonomous province: South Tyrol
- Established: 1980
- Administrative seat: Sterzing (Vipiteno)

Area
  - Total: 650 km^{2} (250 sq mi)

Population (2013)
  - Total: 19,279
  - Density: 30/km^{2} (77/sq mi)
- Website: www.wipptal.org

Wipp Valley (Italian: Alta Vall'Isarco [ˈalta ˌvalliˈzarko]; German: Wipptal) is a district (Italian: comprensorio, German: Bezirksgemeinschaft) in the northern part of the Italian province of South Tyrol. It comprises the South Tyrolean part of the larger geographically defined Wipptal, stretching from Brenner Pass in the north down the upper Eisack (Isarco) river to Franzensfeste in the south. It was separated from neighbouring Eisacktal district in 1980.

== Overview ==
According to the 2001 census, 85.31% of the population of the valley speak German, 14.32% Italian and 0.37% Ladin as mother language.

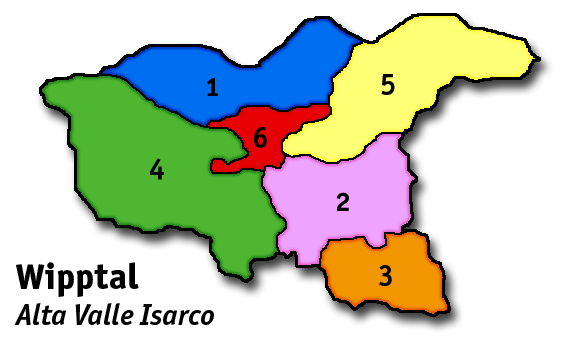
Municipalities of the Wipptal district

The following six municipalities are part of the district of the Wipp Valley:

1. Brenner
2. Freienfeld
3. Franzensfeste
4. Ratschings
5. Pfitsch
6. Sterzing (district capital)
