= Paganella (district) =

- Territory
- Interactive map of Paganella
- Country: Italy
- Autonomous region: Trentino-Alto Adige
- Autonomous province: Trentino (TN)
- Established: 2006

Paganella is one of the sixteen districts of Trentino in the Italian region of Trentino-Alto Adige/Südtirol.
