= Mori, Trentino =

Mori
- Comune
- Comune di Mori
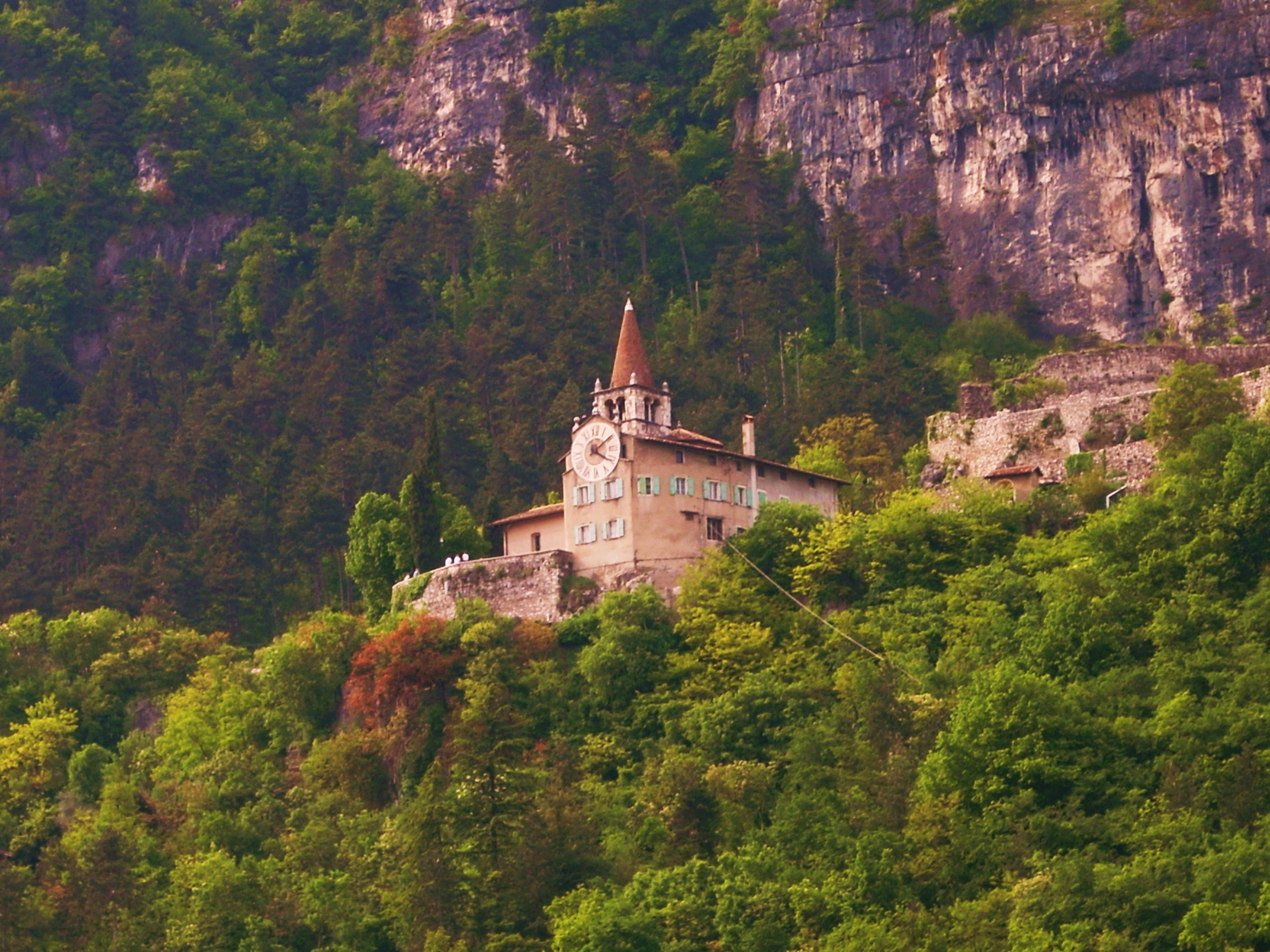
- Sanctuary of Montalbano and the ruins of the castle.

- Coat of arms

- Location within Italy Location within Trentino-Alto Adige/Südtirol
- Coordinates: 45°51′N 10°59′E
- Country: Italy
- Region: Trentino-Alto Adige/Südtirol
- Province: Trentino (TN)
- Frazioni: Besagno, Loppio, Manzano, Molina, Mori Vecchio, Nomesino, Pannone, Ravazzone, Sano, Seghe I, Seghe II, Tierno, Valle S.Felice, Varano

Government
  - Mayor: Nicola Mazzucchi

Area
  - Total: 34.5 km^{2} (13.3 sq mi)
- Elevation: 204 m (669 ft)

Population (2026)
  - Total: 10,328
  - Density: 299/km^{2} (775/sq mi)
- Demonym: Moriani
- Time zone: UTC+1 (CET)
  - Summer (DST): UTC+2 (CEST)
- Postal code: 38065
- Dialing code: 0464
- Website: Official website

Mori (Móri in local dialect) is a comune (municipality) in Trentino in the northern Italian region Trentino-Alto Adige/Südtirol, located about 25 kilometres (16 mi) southwest of Trento.

Mori borders the following municipalities: Arco, Ronzo-Chienis, Isera, Rovereto, Nago-Torbole, Brentonico and Ala. Sights include the Sanctuary of Montalbano with the ruins of a castle, and the Ravezzone Bridge.

== Sports ==
A.S.D. Mori Santo Stefano is the Italian football of the city and was founded in 1989 after the merger of Unione Sportiva Mori (founded in 1945) and Gruppo Sportivo Santo Stefano (founded in 1961). Currently it plays for the first time in Italy's Serie D after the promotion from Eccellenza Trentino-Alto Adige in the 2013–14 season.

Its home ground is Campo Sportivo Mori with 450 seats. The team's colors are yellow, green and black.
