= Valle di Cembra =

- Territory
- Interactive map of Valle di Cembra
- Country: Italy
- Autonomous region: Trentino-Alto Adige
- Autonomous province: Trentino (TN)
- Established: 2006

Valle di Cembra is one of the sixteen districts of Trentino in the Italian region of Trentino-Alto Adige/Südtirol.
