= Trentino =

Autonomous province of Italy

Trentino Trentin (Ladin) Trient (German)
- Autonomous province
- Autonomous Province of Trento; Provincia autonoma di Trento (Italian); Provinzia autonoma de Trent (Ladin); Autonome Provinz Trient (German); Sèlbstendig Provintz vo Tria (Cimbrian); Autonome Provinz va Trea't (Mòcheno)
- Flag Coat of arms
- Anthem: Inno al Trentino
- Location of the province of Trentino in Italy
- Coordinates: 46°26′44″N 11°10′23″E
- Country: Italy
- Region: Trentino-Alto Adige/Südtirol
- Capital(s): Trento
- Municipalities: 166

Government
  - Type: Semi-presidential system
  - President: Maurizio Fugatti (Lega Trentino–Lega)

Area
  - Total: 6,207.12 km^{2} (2,396.58 sq mi)

Population (2026)
  - Total: 548,684
  - Density: 88.3959/km^{2} (228.944/sq mi)

GDP
  - Total: €26.056 billion (2024)
  - Per capita: €47,722 (2024)
- Time zone: UTC+1 (CET)
  - Summer (DST): UTC+2 (CEST)
- Postal code: 38100
- Telephone prefix: 0461, 0462, 0463, 0464, 0465
- Vehicle registration: TN
- HDI (2022): 0.938 very high · 2nd of 21
- ISTAT code: 022

Trentino (Lombard, Venetian and Ladin: Trentin; German: Trient), officially the Autonomous Province of Trento, (Note: Italian: provincia autonoma di Trento; Ladin: provinzia autonoma de Trent; German: Autonome Provinz Trient; Cimbrian: Sèlbstendig Provintz vo Tria; Mòcheno: Autonome Provinz va Trea't.) is an autonomous province of Italy in the country's far north. Trentino and South Tyrol constitute the region of Trentino-Alto Adige/Südtirol, an autonomous region under the constitution. Its capital is the city of Trento (Trent). The province covers an area of 6,207.12 km^{2} (2,396.58 sq mi), with a population of 548,684 as of 2026.

Trentino has a complex history shaped by its position between Italian and Central European cultural spheres. In antiquity, it was inhabited by the Raetian people before being incorporated into the Roman Empire as part of the province of Raetia. During the Middle Ages, Trentino became part of the Prince-Bishopric of Trent within the Holy Roman Empire and later fell under Austrian rule until the end of World War I. Following the war and the Treaty of Saint-Germain-en-Laye (1919), South Tyrol was annexed to the Kingdom of Italy which separated it into two provinces renamed in 1923 as "Trentino" and "Alto Adige". It gained autonomy after World War II under Austrian protection.

Trentino is characterized by its mountainous terrain, notably the Dolomites, which form part of the Alps. The region also exhibits significant linguistic diversity: while Italian is the predominant language, communities speaking Ladin and the German dialects of Mócheno and Cimbrian preserve distinct linguistic traditions that reflect its Alpine and Central European heritage.

== Etymology ==
The province is generally known as "Trentino". The name derives from Trento, the capital city of the province. Originally, the term was used by the local population only to refer to the city and its immediate surroundings. Under former Austrian rule, which began in the 19th century (previously, Trentino was governed by the local bishop), the common German name for the region was Welschtirol (lit. 'Walhaz, meaning Foreign Tyrol') or Welschsüdtirol (lit. 'Walhaz/Foreign South Tyrol'), or just Südtirol, meaning South Tyrol with reference to its geographic position as the southern part of Tyrol.

The corresponding Italian name was Tirolo Meridionale, which was historically used to describe the wider southern part of the County of Tyrol, specifically Trentino and sometimes also today's South Tyrol, or Tirolo Italiano. In its wider sense, Trentino was first used around 1848 in an article by a member of the Frankfurt National Assembly; it became a popular term among leftist intellectual circles in Austria.

Since the new 1972 autonomous status, the administrative name of the province is autonomous province of Trento (Italian: provincia autonoma di Trento; German: Autonome Provinz Trient).

== History ==
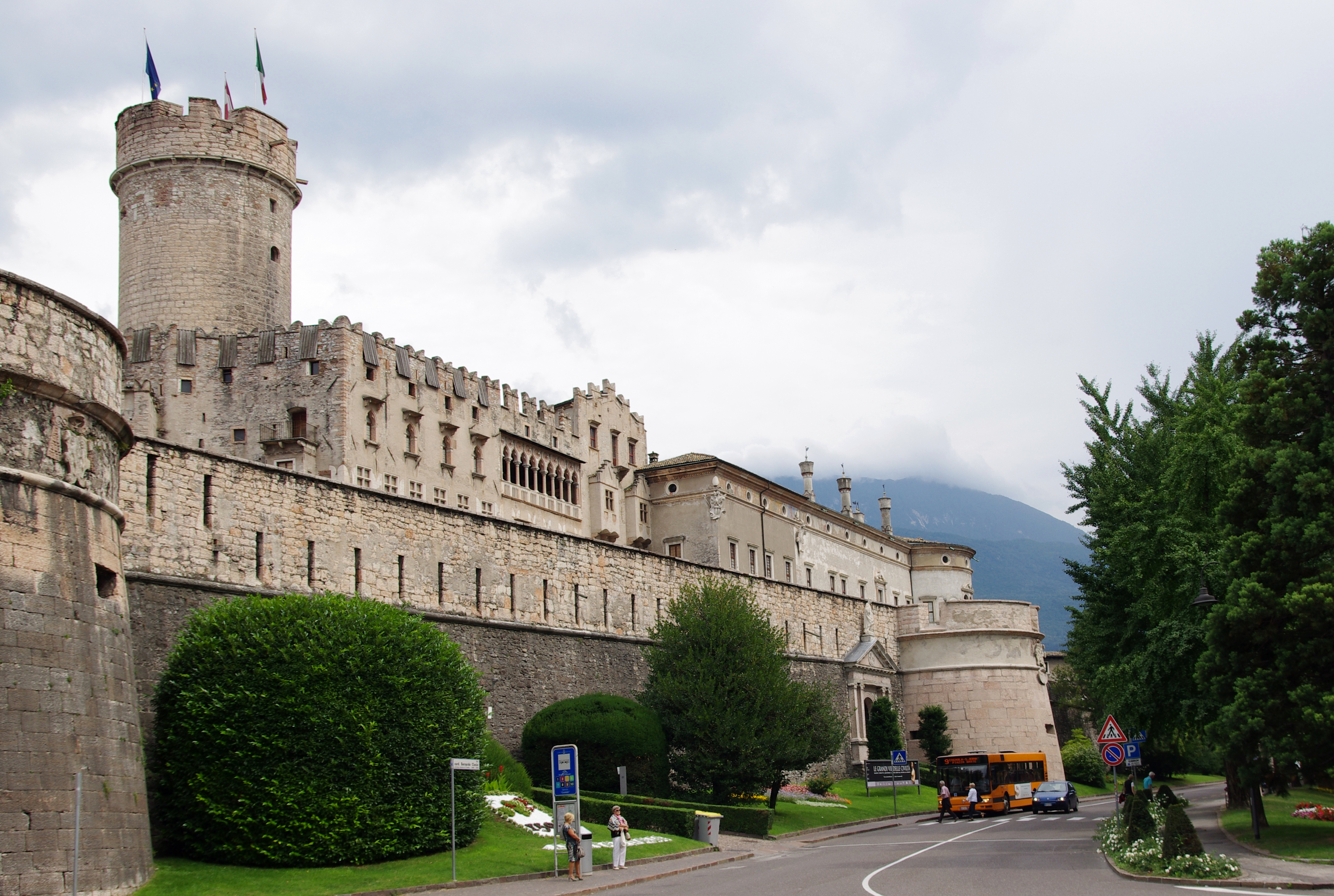
Castello del Buonconsiglio (Buonconsiglio Castle) in Trento was the seat of the prince-bishops from the 13th century to 1803.

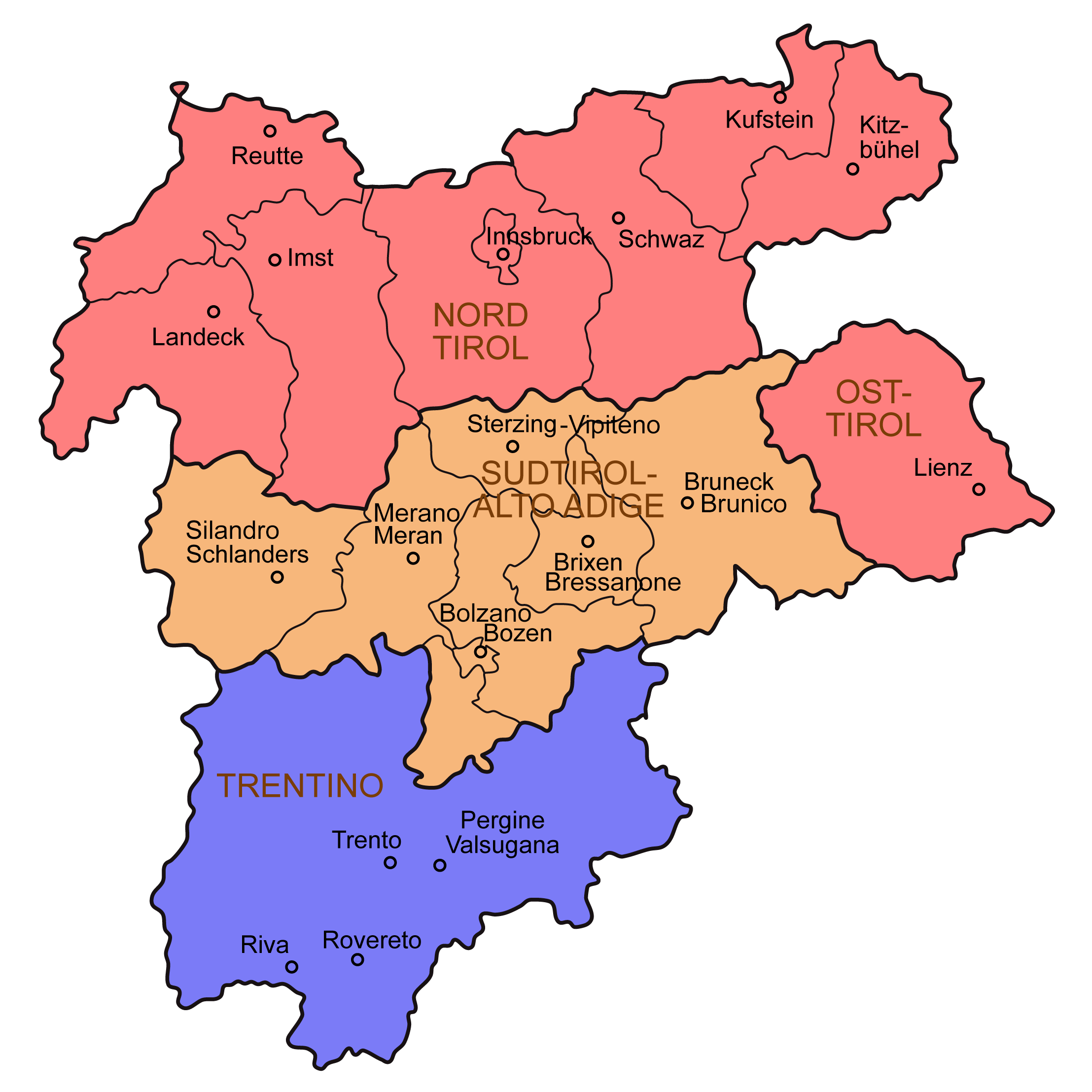
Trentino is part of the Euroregion Tyrol-South Tyrol-Trentino, which corresponds to the historic Tyrol region.

The history of Trentino begins in the mid-Stone Age. The valleys of what is now Trentino were already inhabited by man, the main settlements being in the valley of the Adige River, thanks to its milder climate.

In the early Middle Ages, this area was included within the Kingdom of Italy and the March of Verona. In 1027, the Bishopric of Trent was established as a State of the Holy Roman Empire by Emperor Conrad II. It was an ecclesiastical territory, roughly corresponding to the present-day Trentino, governed by the Prince-Bishops of Trento.

The Council of Trent, held in three major sessions from 1545 to 1563, with the first at Trento, was one of the important councils in the history of the Roman Catholic Church. It was an articulation of Roman Catholic doctrine in response to the Protestant Reformation, and specified doctrine on salvation, the sacraments, and the Biblical canon.

After the Napoleonic Wars of the early 19th century, the bishopric was secularized and absorbed into the Austrian County of Tyrol. It was governed by the House of Habsburg-Lorraine. The region was the location of heavy fighting during World War I, as it was directly on the front lines between Austria-Hungary and Italy. Italy occupied Trentino in November 1918, and the region was formally ceded to it under the Treaty of Saint-Germain-en-Laye (1919).

After World War II, the Italian and Austrian Foreign Ministers signed the Gruber-De Gasperi Agreement, creating the autonomous region of Trentino-Alto Adige/Südtirol, consisting of the autonomous provinces of Trentino and South Tyrol. Since the treaty, Trentino has enjoyed considerable autonomy from the Italian central government in Rome. It has its own elected government and legislative assembly.

In 1996, the Euroregion Tyrol-South Tyrol-Trentino was formed between the Austrian state of Tyrol and the Italian provinces of South Tyrol and Trentino. The boundaries of the association correspond to the old County of Tyrol. The aim is to promote regional peace, understanding and cooperation in many areas. The region's assemblies meet together as one on various occasions and have set up a common liaison office to the European Union in Brussels.

== Geography ==
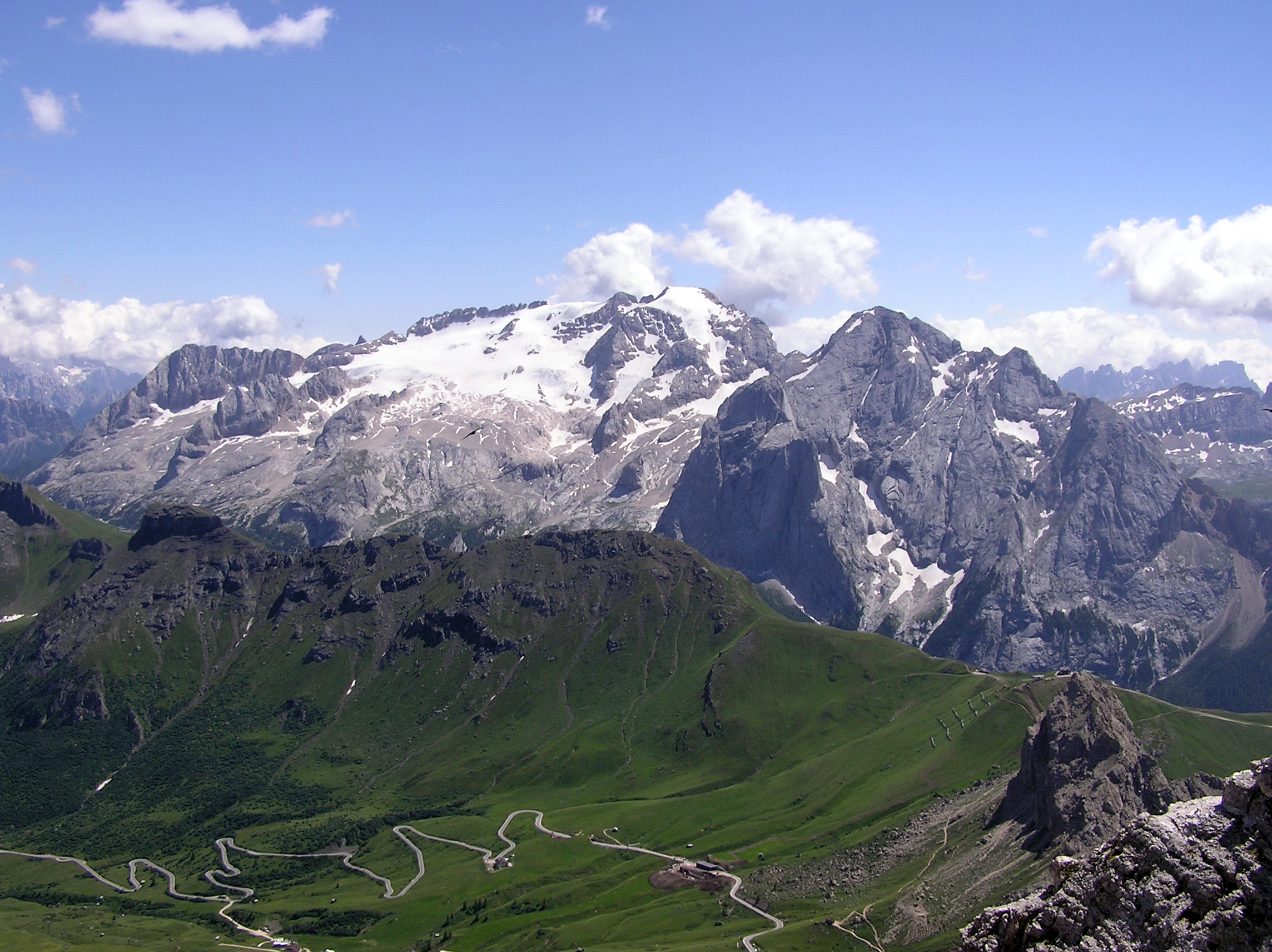
The Marmolada, in the northeast, is the highest mountain in the Dolomites.

Trentino is a mountainous region. The Adige River flows through the central Trentino in a valley named after the river. The principal towns of Trentino lie in the Adige Valley, which has been a historical passage connecting Italy with Central Europe. Among other important valleys are Non Valley, known for its apple production, Sole Valley, Giudicarie, which has been historically connected by Trento and Brescia, Fiemme and Fassa, Lagarina, Mocheni, Sugana Valley and many others.

The province has an area of 6,214 km^{2} (2,399 sq mi), and a total population of 524,826 (2010). There are 217 comuni (singular: comune), in the province.

The region is known for housing the Dolomites, a mountainous UNESCO World Heritage Site. The Marmolada, at 3,343 m (10,968 ft) above sea level, is the highest mountain in the Dolomites. The glacier on the Marmolada is also a landmark. Other notable mountains include the Kesselkogel Cermis, Crozzon di Brenta, Latemar, Piz Boè, and Vezzana.

The highest mountain situated completely within the Trentino borders is Presanella. The highest point is Monte Cevedale, located on the border with the Province of Sondrio.

== Politics ==
The 1972 second Statute of Autonomy for Trentino-Alto Adige/Südtirol devolved most legislative and executive competences from the regional level to the provincial level, creating de facto two separate regions. Administratively, the province enjoys a large degree of autonomy in the following sectors: health, education, welfare and transport infrastructure. The provincial council comprises 35 members, one of whom must by law be drawn from the Ladin minority.

In the elections in 2023, the centre-right coalition won 21 of 35 seats in the province's council. These 21 seats were distributed between the Trentino League with 6 seats (including the provincial governor ("presidente") Maurizio Fugatti), the Brothers of Italy (5) Fugatti for Governor (4), the Trentino Tyrolean Autonomist Party (3), The Civic List (2) and the Fassa Association which provides this session's legally mandated seat for the province's Ladin minority (1). The centre-left alliance makes up most of the opposition, with 13 seats. This includes 7 seats for the Democratic Party, 4 seats for Campobase and one seat each for the Greens and Left Alliance and Autonomy House. There was also a non-allied party, Wave, which won one seat.

The executive powers are attributed to the provincial government (Italian: Giunta Provinciale), headed by the governor (Presidente). Since 2018 the governor is Maurizio Fugatti. In 2023, Fugatti remained in power by receiving 51.8% of the vote for governor compared to 37.5% for Francesco Valduga of the centre-left coalition and about 10% for candidates aligned with neither major coalition.

In addition to serving as the legislative body for the province, the members of the council also combine with South Tyrol's council to form the regional council of Trentino-Alto Adige/Südtirol. Trentino's governor alternates with the governor of South Tyrol as president of the region. The regional government has its seat in the former Hotel Imperial in Trento.

=== Municipalities ===
The autonomous province has 166 municipalities:

- Ala
- Albiano
- Aldeno
- Altavalle
- Altopiano della Vigolana
- Amblar-Don
- Andalo
- Arco
- Avio
- Baselga di Pinè
- Bedollo
- Besenello
- Bieno
- Bleggio Superiore
- Bocenago
- Bondone
- Borgo Chiese
- Borgo d'Anaunia
- Borgo Lares
- Borgo Valsugana
- Brentonico
- Bresimo
- Caderzone Terme
- Calceranica al Lago
- Caldes
- Caldonazzo
- Calliano
- Campitello di Fassa
- Campodenno
- Canal San Bovo
- Canazei
- Capriana
- Carisolo
- Carzano
- Castel Condino
- Castel Ivano
- Castello Tesino
- Castello-Molina di Fiemme
- Castelnuovo
- Cavalese
- Cavareno
- Cavedago
- Cavedine
- Cavizzana
- Cembra Lisignago
- Cimone
- Cinte Tesino
- Cis
- Civezzano
- Cles
- Comano Terme
- Commezzadura
- Contà
- Croviana
- Dambel
- Denno
- Dimaro Folgarida
- Drena
- Dro
- Fai della Paganella
- Fiavè
- Fierozzo
- Folgaria
- Fornace
- Frassilongo
- Garniga Terme
- Giovo
- Giustino
- Grigno
- Imer
- Isera
- Lavarone
- Lavis
- Ledro
- Levico Terme
- Livo
- Lona-Lases
- Luserna
- Madruzzo
- Malè
- Massimeno
- Mazzin
- Mezzana
- Mezzano
- Mezzocorona
- Mezzolombardo
- Moena
- Molveno
- Mori
- Nago-Torbole
- Nogaredo
- Nomi
- Novaledo
- Novella
- Ospedaletto
- Ossana
- Palù del Fersina
- Panchià
- Peio
- Pellizzano
- Pelugo
- Pergine Valsugana
- Pieve di Bono-Prezzo
- Pieve Tesino
- Pinzolo
- Pomarolo
- Porte di Rendena
- Predaia
- Predazzo
- Primiero San Martino di Castrozza
- Rabbi
- Riva del Garda
- Romeno
- Roncegno Terme
- Ronchi Valsugana
- Ronzo-Chienis
- Ronzone
- Roverè della Luna
- Rovereto
- Ruffrè-Mendola
- Rumo
- Sagron Mis
- Samone
- San Giovanni di Fassa
- San Lorenzo Dorsino
- San Michele all'Adige
- Sant'Orsola Terme
- Sanzeno
- Sarnonico
- Scurelle
- Segonzano
- Sella Giudicarie
- Sfruz
- Soraga di Fassa
- Sover
- Spiazzo
- Spormaggiore
- Sporminore
- Stenico
- Storo
- Strembo
- Telve
- Telve di Sopra
- Tenna
- Tenno
- Terragnolo
- Terre d'Adige
- Terzolas
- Tesero
- Tione di Trento
- Ton
- Torcegno
- Trambileno
- Tre Ville
- Trento
- Valdaone
- Valfloriana
- Vallarsa
- Vallelaghi
- Vermiglio
- Vignola-Falesina
- Villa Lagarina
- Ville d'Anaunia
- Ville di Fiemme
- Volano
- Ziano di Fiemme

=== Districts ===
Due to the division of the province into the 166 municipalities (comuni/Gemeinden), often of small or even tiny size, in the late 1970s, eleven larger units known as districts (comprensori) were introduced. The municipalities forming a district elect the council for that district. However, this tier of government has provoked criticism, and, in 2006, a reform created fifteen more homogeneous "Valley Communities" (comunità di valle, Talgemeinden) and one territory including the municipalities of Trento, Cimone, Aldeno and Garniga Terme (see Municipalities of Trentino).

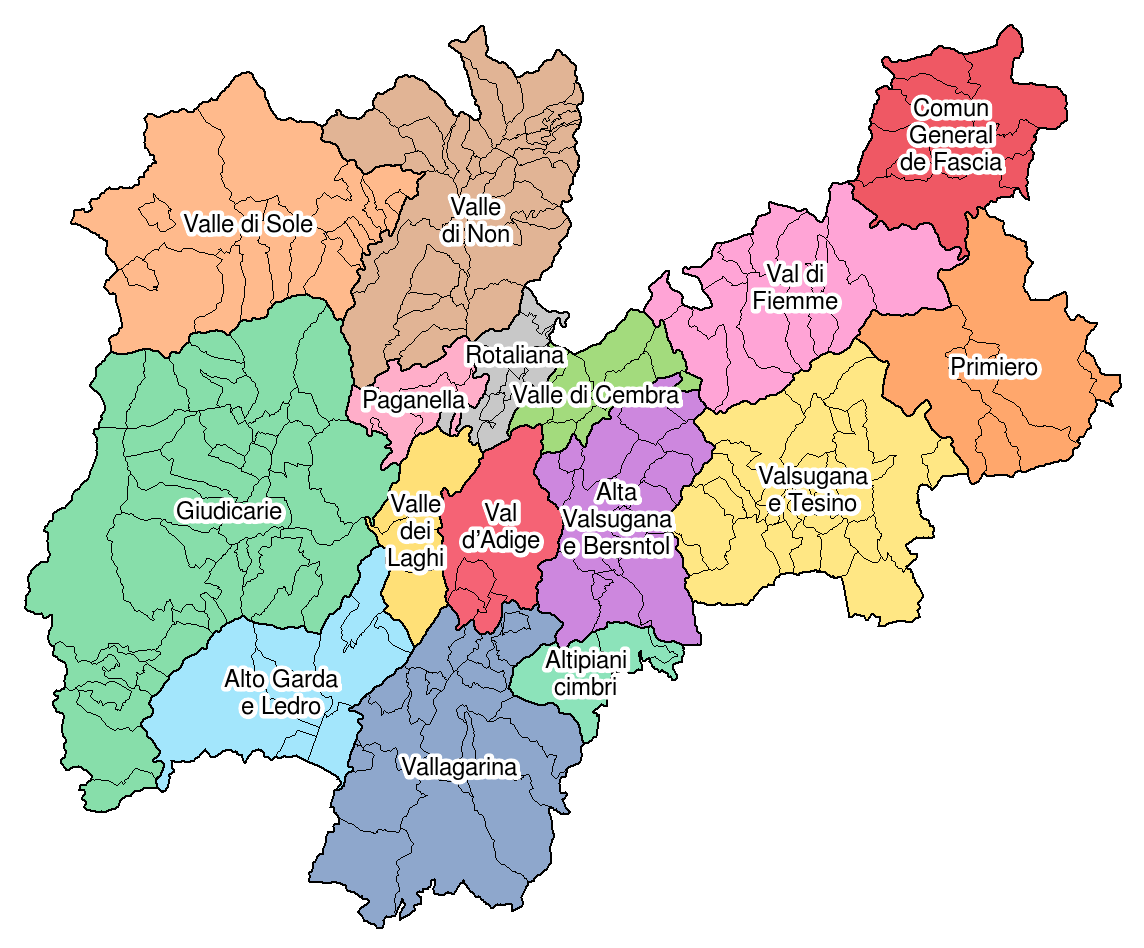
Map of Trentino with its 16 new districts, established in 2006

Map of Trentino with its 11 districts, abolished in 2006

#	Name	Municipalities	Inhabitants	Capital	Map
1	Comunità territoriale della Val di Fiemme	9	18,567	Cavalese	
2	Comunità di Primiero	5	9,836	Tonadico	
3	Comunità Valsugana e Tesino	18	25,694	Borgo Valsugana	
4	Comunità Alta Valsugana e Bersntol	15	45,228	Pergine Valsugana	
5	Comunità della Valle di Cembra	7	10,854	Cembra	
6	Comunità della Val di Non	29	37,143	Cles	
7	Comunità della Valle di Sole	13	15,020	Malè	
8	Comunità delle Giudicarie	25	35,647	Tione di Trento	
9	Comunità Alto Garda e Ledro	7	42,955	Riva del Garda	
10	Comunità della Vallagarina	17	78,482	Rovereto	
11	Comun General de Fascia	6	9,195	Pozza di Fassa	
12	Magnifica Comunità degli Altipiani Cimbri	3	4,442	Lavarone	
13	Comunità Rotaliana-Königsberg	7	25,953	Mezzocorona	
14	Comunità della Paganella	5	4,731	Andalo	
15	Val d'Adige territory	4	110,061	none	
16	Comunità della Valle dei Laghi	3	9,349	Vezzano	

As of 2009, the only municipalities with a population over 20,000 were Trento, Rovereto, and Pergine Valsugana.

== Demographics ==
Historical population
Year	Pop.	±%
1921	404,237	—
1931	384,125	−5.0%
1936	370,739	−3.5%
1951	394,704	+6.5%
1961	412,104	+4.4%
1971	427,845	+3.8%
1981	442,845	+3.5%
1991	449,852	+1.6%
2001	477,017	+6.0%
2011	524,832	+10.0%
2021	540,958	+3.1%
Source: ISTAT

As of 2026, the population is 548,684, of which 49.5% are male, and 50.5% are female. Minors make up 15.7% of the population, and seniors make up 24.5%.

=== Languages ===
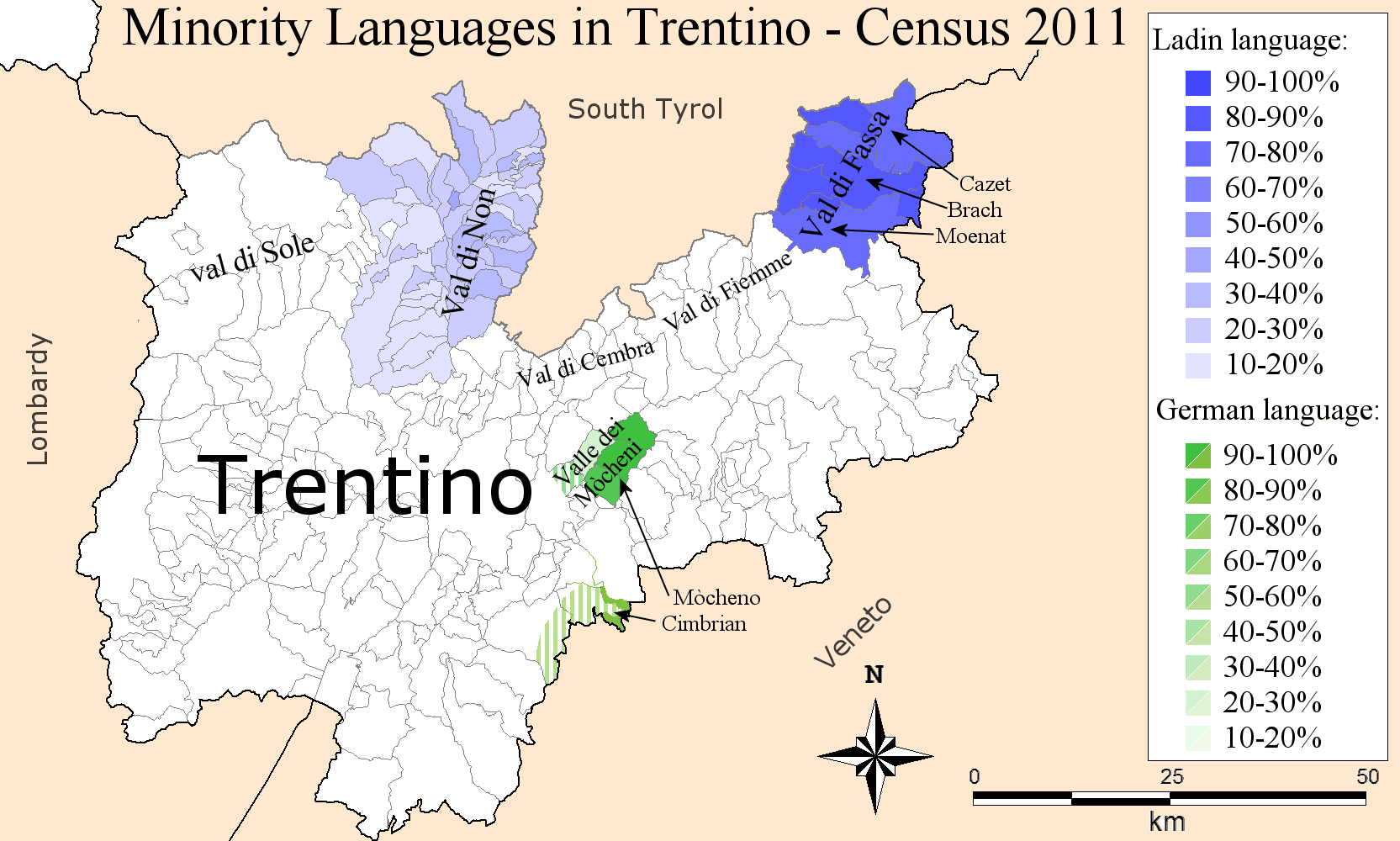
Minority languages in Trentino. Census-data per municipality 2011.

The majority of the Trentino population is Italian-speaking, with the local languages of native Italian being transition dialects of Eastern Lombard and Venetian. The region is also home to three indigenous linguistic minorities, which are Ladin, Mòcheno and Cimbrian. All languages are protected by regional and provincial laws, statutes, and regulations.

After World War II and the devolution of power to regional authorities, a change in policy slowly began, which gained momentum in the 1990s. Since then a number of far-reaching laws and regulations have been passed and implemented, that protect and promote the use of these three languages and the unique cultural heritage and identity. This has for example been extended to school curricula in the regional languages and street signs becoming bilingual. All three minorities have their own cultural institute which were decreed by national law and receive state funds. The purpose of these cultural institutes is to safeguard and promote the respective culture and languages.

The Ladin minority is found in the Fassa Valley, in the municipalities of Canazei (Cianacei), Campitello di Fassa (Ciampedel), Mazzin (Mazin), Moena, Soraga and Sèn Jan di Fassa. In the census of 2001, 16,462 inhabitants of Trentino declared Ladin as their native language.

Mòcheno is still spoken in the municipalities of Frassilongo (Garait), Palù del Fersina (Palai en Bersntol) and Fierozzo (Vlarötz), while the Cimbrian language is spoken in Luserna (Lusérn). The 2001 census found there were 2,276 native Mócheno and 882 Cimbrian speakers. A recorded percentage of 57.8% in 2001 declared themselves as belonging to the Mòcheno population in the municipality of Sant'Orsola Terme, despite the municipality not being included in the core Mòcheno-speaking area. The percentage dropped to 13% in the 2021 census. In 2021 also, a percentage of 10.2% of the inhabitants in the municipality of Terragnolo were recorded as belonging to the Cimbrian language group. 17,160 inhabitants of the Val di Non declared themselves as belonging to the Ladin linguistic minority, representing 18.2% of the valley's population. In the Val di Sole, Ladins accounted for 6.2% of the population, equal to 954 inhabitants. In Spormaggiore, the percentage was 11.3%.

Territorial distribution of the Ladin, Mòcheno, and Cimbrian languages in Trentino in 2021

Legislative Decree No. 592 of December 16, 1993, introduced a 'Survey on the size and territorial distribution of the populations speaking Ladin, Mòcheno, and Cimbrian' (RCDT), in order to determine the number and geographic distribution of individuals belonging to linguistic minorities in Trentino. The survey was an integral part of the general censuses of 2001 and 2011. In 2021, it was carried out independently but during the same period as the permanent census.

Minority languages	2001 no. of members	2001 percent compared to the population of Trentino	2011 no. of members	2011 percentage compared to the Trentino population	2021 no. of members	2021 percentage compared to the Trentino population
Ladin	16,462	3.5%	18,550	3.5%	15,775	2.9%
Mòcheno	2,276	0.5%	1,660	0.3%	1,397	0.3%
Cimbrian	882	0.2%	1 072	0.2%	1,111	0.2%

In the 2021 RCDT survey, the understanding and knowledge of the three languages by the provincial population who responded to the survey were also analyzed, regardless of their declared affiliation.

Knowledge of Ladin, Mòcheno, and Cimbrian 2021
Language	Respondents 2021	Understand	Speaks	Read	Write
Ladin	125,919	17.5%	11.3%	10.6%	7.3%
Mòcheno	125,919	4.2%	0.8%	1.1%	0.4%
Cimbrian	125,919	4.0%	0.6%	0.9%	0.3%

Starting from the 2001 census, proposals have been made to recognize the Ladin identity of the Non Valley at the provincial level, and also in parliament. In 2013, the Provincial Council of Trento approved a motion acknowledging the 2011 census, which revealed a request from the populations of the Non Valley and the municipalities of Spormaggiore and Cavedago to promote their linguistic identity. Between 2020 and 2021, the municipal councils of 16 out of 23 municipalities in the Non Valley passed resolutions in favor of Ladin identity. The classification of the Non Valley and Sole Valley idioms as part of the Rhaeto-Romance linguistic group remains a subject of linguistic and political debate.

The Nones language hails from the Non Valley and is considered by some linguists a variant of Ladin. Estimates range up to 30,000 speakers. The Solandro language is also under debate as to whether it is a dialect of Ladin or a separate language. Native speakers are mainly found in the Sole Valley and are estimated to be up to 15,000. Both idioms are alternatively considered as dialects within the range of Gallo-Romance languages. There is no official census to date that has Nones and Solandro as officially distinct languages. The total number of Ladin speakers in the census of 2001 exceeds the population of around 7,500 in the Fassa Valley. A number of Nones and Solandro speakers identified as Ladin speakers, while others chose not to exercise that option due to the disagreement whether or not their languages are Ladin or a separate idiom.

=== Immigration ===
As of 2025, immigrants make up 13.6% of the population. The 5 largest foreign countries of birth are Albania, Romania, Morocco, Moldova, and Pakistan.

== Culture ==
The Trentino is a region of cultural encounters. Already in the past Germans, Italians and Ladins joined in this area. The alpine province is a piece of land, in which mountain passes and elevated plains join hilly valleys and plains and in which different people and cultures join. Its history, but also the relatively insular geographic position of some valleys led to an extraordinary richness in culture and many customs and traditions that have been kept alive up to the present. Also some minority groups and gastronomic peculiarities have been preserved till now.

=== Museums ===
In the territory of the province there are numerous museums, which have had significant development over the last twenty years by the financial resources of the province. Among the main ones:

- the modern and contemporary art museum of Trento and Rovereto (MART), inaugurated in 2002, based in Corso Bettini in Rovereto. The modern architectural structure was designed by Mario Botta and fits harmoniously into the historical fabric of the city. MART can boast an extensive permanent collection of contemporary works and aims to take on an increasingly international dimension.
- the MUSE, museum of the sciences of Trento.
- The Civic Museum of Rovereto, founded in 1851 and among the oldest Italian museums;
- the Buonconsiglio museum near the castle of the same name and the Historical Museum in Trento in via Torre d'Augusto;
- the Tridentine Museum of Natural Sciences, located in Trento;
- the aeronautics museum, dedicated to Gianni Caproni (based in Mattarello);
- the museum of the uses and customs of the Trentino people, one of the major ethnographic and material culture museums of the entire Alpine area, with headquarters in San Michele all'Adige;
- the Italian historical museum of the War of Rovereto, dedicated to the First World War, hosted at the city's castle.
- the geological museum of the Dolomites in Predazzo
- Padre Kino Museum located in Segno in the Val di Non chronicles the life of missionary explorer Eusebio Kino and the indigenous people of today's borderlands of Arizona and Sonora.

Also worthy of note are the cultural institutes and museums dedicated to the three minorities of the province, the Istitut cultural Ladin "majon di fascegn" in Val di Fassa and the "Kulturinstitut Bersntol - Lusérn" for the promotion of German-speaking minorities mòchene and Cimbre.

=== Castles ===
In the region there are numerous castles. With the financial aid of province, some of them could be restored and are now open to the public. Here the most important:

- Castel del Buonconsiglio, in Trento;
- Castel Thun, in the Val di Non;
- Castel Stenico, in the Vallagarina;
- Castel Beseno, in the Adige Valley;
- Castel Toblino, in the Valle del Sarca;
- Castel Cles, near Cles, in the Val di Non;
- Arco Castle, in Arco.

=== Sports and recreation ===
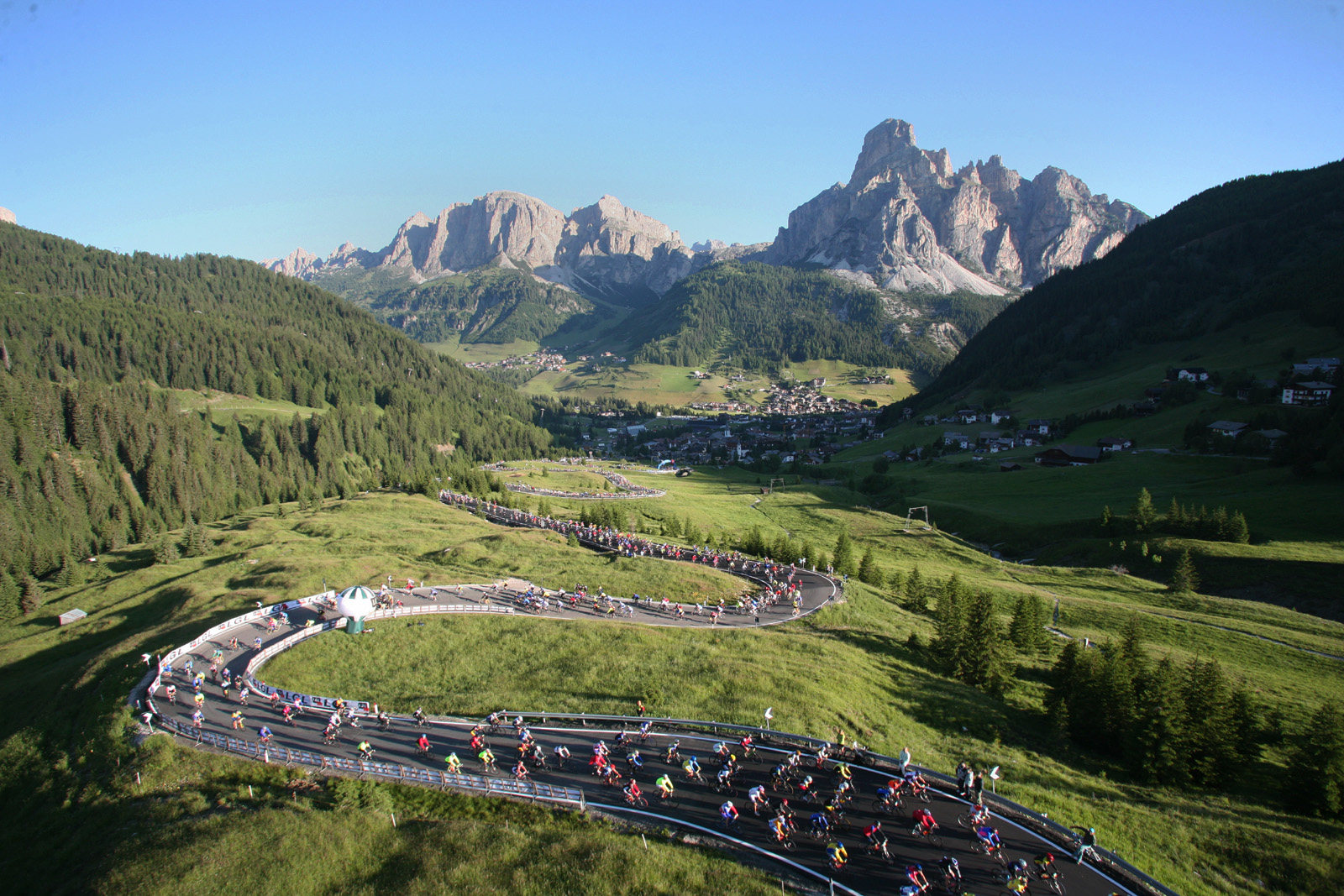
2008 Maratona dles Dolomites ascent to Campolongo Pass, with Corvara in the background

The region offers many opportunities for mountain climbing and trekking and winter sports. Important winter events are the world championships organised by the International Ski Federation (FSI) such as the Nordic ski 1991, 2003 and 2013, snowboarding 2001 and freestyle ski championship 2007, as well as the Adamello Ski Raid and Marcialonga. The Tour de Ski has since 2007 had its conclusion in Val di Fiemme with the Final Climb stage up the alpine skiing course on Alpe Cermis.

During the spring and summer, cycling is a big event in the region, such as the Giro del Trentino and Maratona dles Dolomites over the mountain passes. Cross country racing such as the Cross della Vallagarina and the 10-kilometre road running competition Giro al Sas also take place.

Association football is a popular ball sport in Trentino. Teams within the region are U.S. Alta Vallagarina, A.C. Mezzocorona, A.S.D. Porfido Albiano and Trento Calcio 1921.

Trentino Volley is a professional Italian volleyball team. It has played in the Italian Volleyball League without interruption since 2000, while Aquila Trento is a basketball team in the Italian top league.

== Economy ==
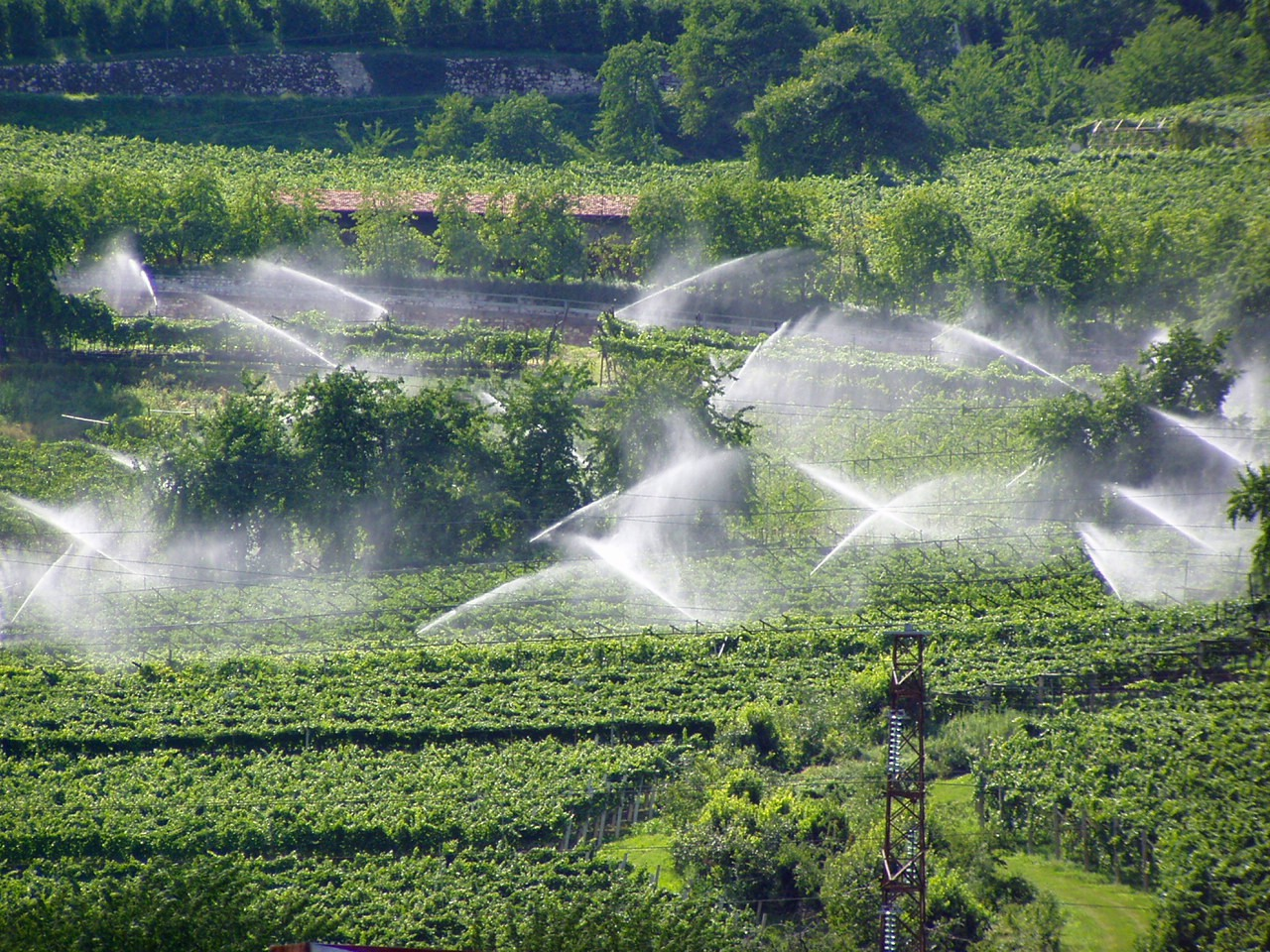
Vineyards of Trentino

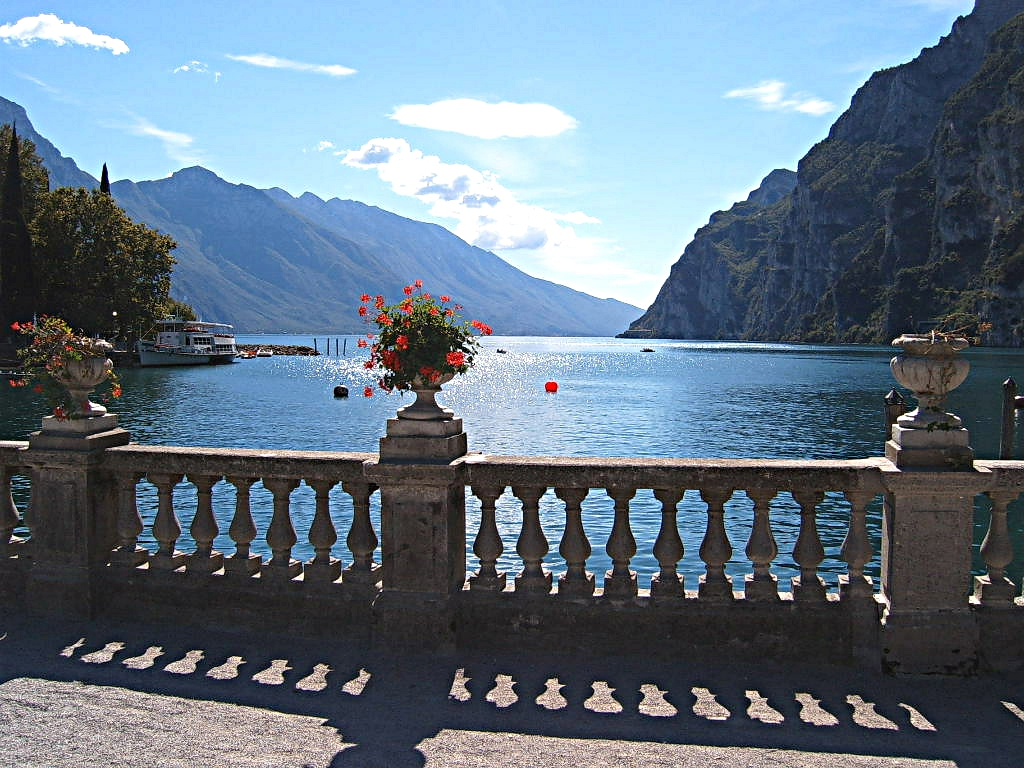
A view of Lake Garda from Riva del Garda in the south. Tourism is one of the primary revenue areas of the Trentine economy.

The Gross domestic product (GDP) of the region was 25.5 billion euros in 2023, accounting for 1.2% of Italy's economic output. GDP per capita adjusted for purchasing power was 37,900 euros or 126% of the EU27 average in the same year. The GDP per employee was 119% of the EU average.

Despite the overwhelmingly mountainous nature of the territory, agriculture remains important. Farms often join to form larger cooperatives. The most important produce comprises apples (50% of national production, together with South Tyrol) and other fruit, vegetables (primarily in the Val di Gresta), and grapes. Important especially for their quality, the latter are used for the production of dry and sparkling wines.

In January 2008, the Edmund Mach Foundation was established to promote research, training and services in the agricultural, agri-food and environmental fields.

The primary industries, often small and medium-sized, are concentrated in Valsugana, Vallagarina and the Adige Valleys. Sectors include textiles, mechanics, wood and paper productions. Also important is the production of hydro-electric energy.

Tourism is the mainstay of the provincial economy. The main resorts include: Madonna di Campiglio, San Martino di Castrozza, Fiera di Primiero, Canazei, Moena, Cavalese, Folgaria, Folgarida-Marilleva, Riva del Garda and Levico Terme, Comano Terme and Roncegno, these last three being renowned thermal stations.

The unemployment rate stood at 3.8% in 2023.

== Transport ==
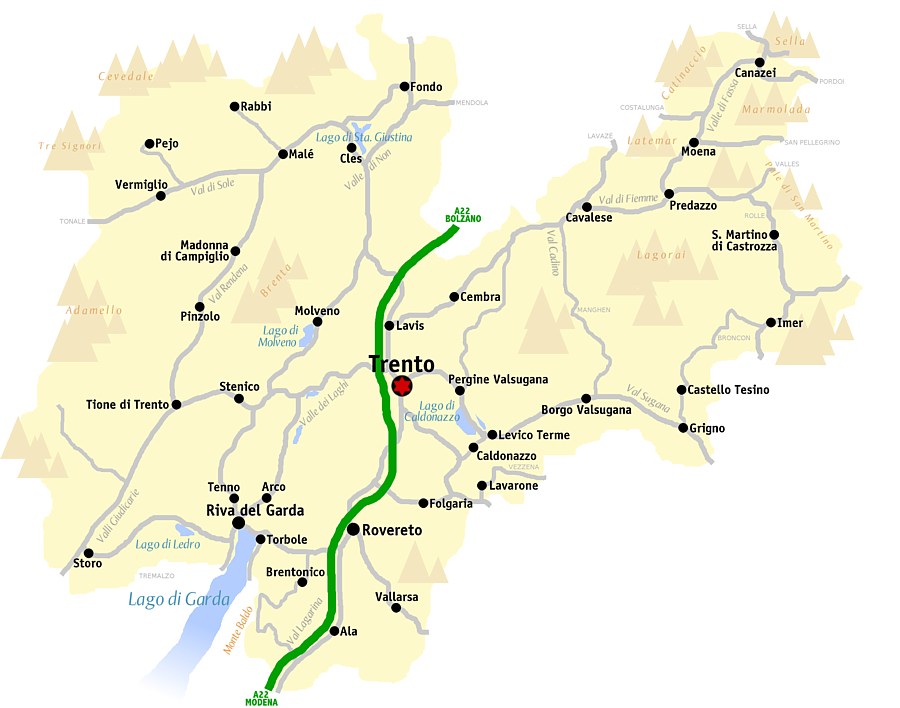
Roadmap of Trentino

The Trentino province is crossed by the main road and rail connections between Italy and Germany. These include the Brenner A22 motorway and road which passes through the Etsch/Adige Valley. A regional project of switching much of the road traffic to railways is currently under consideration.

The province has two more railways: the Valsugana Line, connecting Trento to Venice and the Trento-Malè-Marilleva railway between Trento and Malè.

== See also ==
- Tyrol
- History of Tyrol
- Trentino-Alto Adige/Südtirol
- Novella, Trentino
- Mount Lefre
- Lake Valle
