= Ronzo-Chienis =

- Comune
- Comune di Ronzo-Chienis
- Coat of arms

- Location within Italy Location within Trentino-Alto Adige/Südtirol
- Coordinates: 45°53′28″N 10°57′02″E
- Country: Italy
- Region: Trentino-Alto Adige/Südtirol
- Province: Trentino (TN)

Government
  - Mayor: Gianni Carotta, since 2020-09-22

Area
  - Total: 13.2 km^{2} (5.1 sq mi)
- Elevation: 991 m (3,251 ft)

Population (31 December 2010)
  - Total: 1,022
  - Density: 77.4/km^{2} (201/sq mi)
- Time zone: UTC+1 (CET)
  - Summer (DST): UTC+2 (CEST)
- Postal code: 38060
- Dialing code: 0464
- Website: Official website

Ronzo-Chienis (Rónž e Cianìs in local dialect) is a comune (municipality) in Trentino in the Italian region Trentino-Alto Adige/Südtirol, located about 25 kilometres (16 mi) southwest of Trento in the Val di Gresta.

Ronzo-Chienis borders the following municipalities: Arco, Villa Lagarina, Isera and Mori.
