= Isera =

- Comune
- Comune di Isera
- Location within Italy Location within Trentino-Alto Adige/Südtirol
- Coordinates: 45°53′N 11°1′E
- Country: Italy
- Region: Trentino-Alto Adige/Südtirol
- Province: Trentino (TN)
- Frazioni: Marano, Cornalé, Reviano, Folaso, Patone, Lenzima, Bordala

Government
  - Mayor: Emanuele Valduga

Area
  - Total: 14.1 km^{2} (5.4 sq mi)

Population (2026)
  - Total: 2,816
  - Density: 200/km^{2} (517/sq mi)
- Demonym: Iserotti
- Time zone: UTC+1 (CET)
  - Summer (DST): UTC+2 (CEST)
- Postal code: 38060
- Dialing code: 0464
- Patron saint: San Vincenzo
- Website: Official website

Isera (Iséra in local dialect) is a comune (municipality) in Trentino in the northern Italian region Trentino-Alto Adige/Südtirol, located about 20 kilometres (12 mi) southwest of Trento. As of 31 December 2004, it had a population of 2,496 and an area of 14.1 square kilometres (5.4 mi^{2}).

The municipality of Isera contains the frazioni (subdivisions, mainly villages and hamlets) Marano, Cornalé, Reviano, Folaso, Patone, Lenzima and Bordala.

Isera borders the following municipalities: Villa Lagarina, Ronzo-Chienis, Rovereto, Nogaredo and Mori.

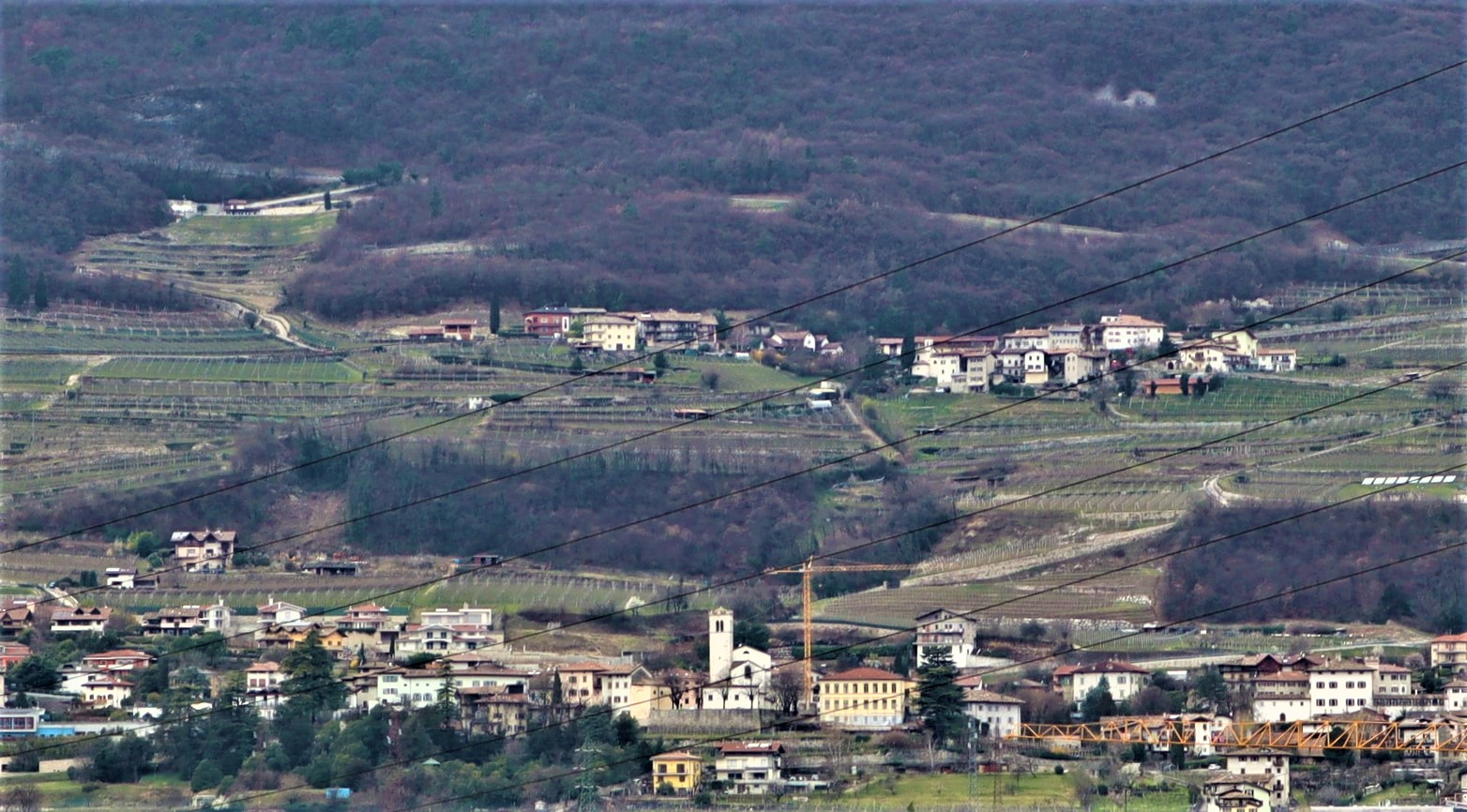
the entrance of the inhabited area

== Demographic evolution ==
Historical population

Year	Pop.	±%
1861	?	—
1871	?	—
1881	?	—
1901	?	—
1911	?	—

Year	Pop.	±%
1921	1,856	—
1931	1,913	+3.1%
1936	1,933	+1.0%
1951	1,860	−3.8%
1961	1,847	−0.7%

Year	Pop.	±%
1971	2,135	+15.6%
1981	2,148	+0.6%
1991	2,235	+4.1%
2001	2,469	+10.5%

Source: Data from ISTAT
