= Altipiani Cimbri =

- Territory
- Interactive map of Altipiani Cimbri
- Coordinates: 45°56′23″N 11°16′09″E
- Country: Italy
- Autonomous region: Trentino-Alto Adige
- Autonomous province: Trentino (TN)
- Established: 2006

Altipiani Cimbri is one of the sixteen districts of Trentino in the Italian region of Trentino-Alto Adige/Südtirol.
