= Aldeno =

- Comune
- Comune di Aldeno
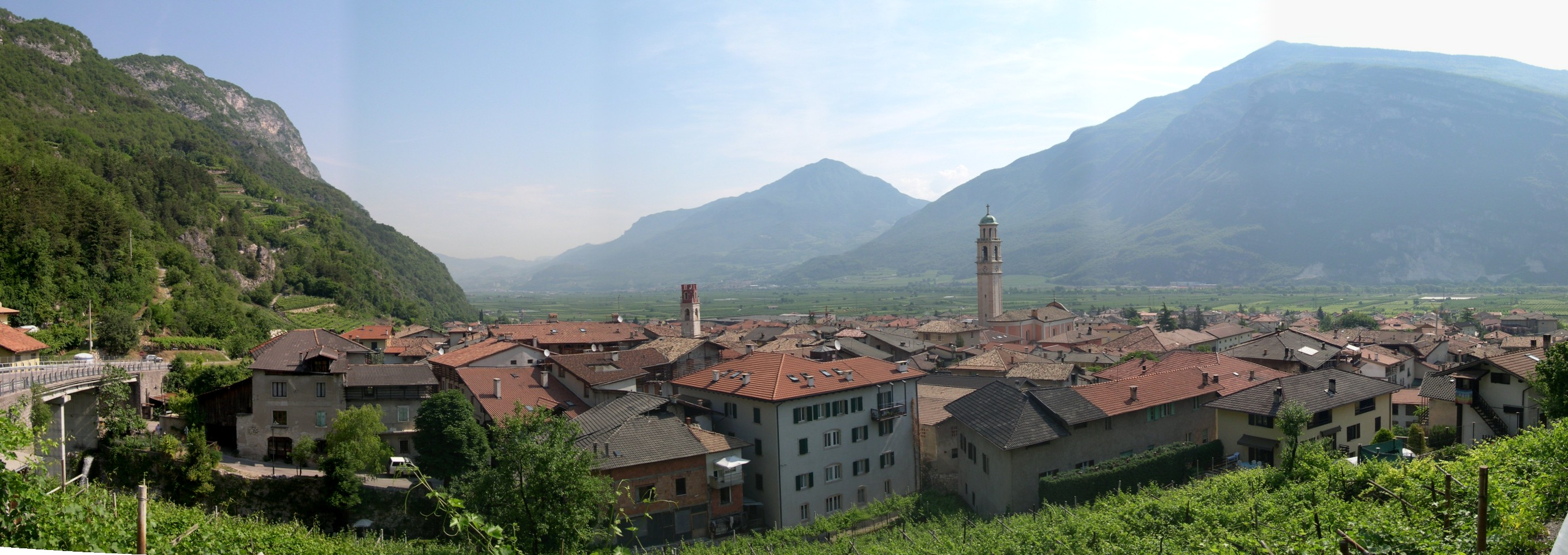
- View of Aldeno

- Location of Aldeno in Italy Aldeno (Trentino-Alto Adige/Südtirol)
- Coordinates: 45°59′N 11°5′E
- Country: Italy
- Region: Trentino-Alto Adige/Südtirol
- Province: Trentino (TN)

Government
  - Mayor: Alida Cramerotti

Area
  - Total: 8 km^{2} (3.1 sq mi)
- Elevation: 210 m (690 ft)

Population (2026)
  - Total: 3,360
  - Density: 420/km^{2} (1,100/sq mi)
- Demonym: Aldeneri
- Time zone: UTC+1 (CET)
  - Summer (DST): UTC+2 (CEST)
- Postal code: 38060
- Dialing code: 0461
- Patron saint: Saint Modest
- Website: Official website

Aldeno is a comune in Trentino in north Italy.
