= Fiemme Valley =

Valley in Northern Italy

Coordinates: 46.2833°N 11.5667°E

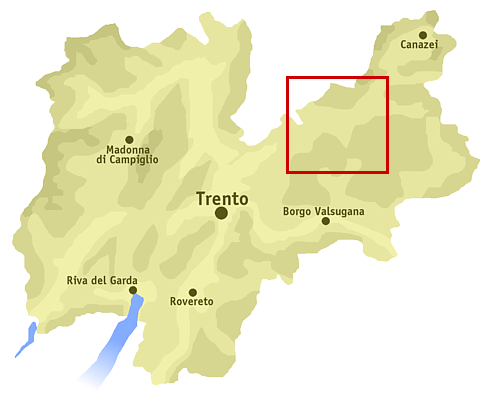
Location of the Fiemme Valley in Trentino.

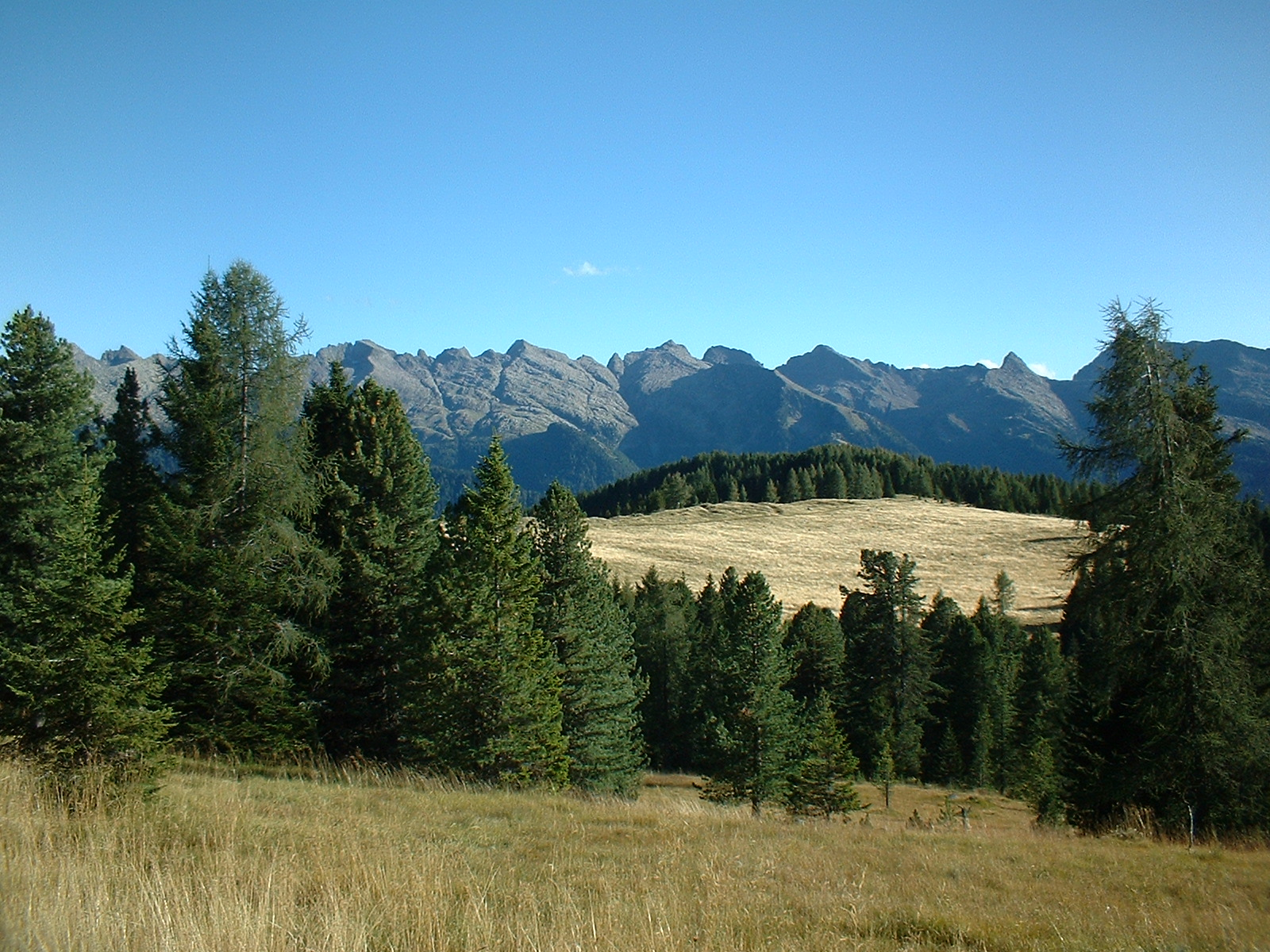
The Lagorai seen from Passo Lusia.

Fiemme Valley (Italian: Val di Fiemme, German: Fleimstal) is a valley in the Trentino province, i.e. the southern half of the Trentino-Alto Adige/Südtirol region, in northern Italy, located in the Dolomites mountain region.

== History ==
In Classical Antiquity, the valley was part of the Cisalpine Gaul province of the Roman Empire. Following the Augustan organization of Italy, the valley became part of Roman Italy. Since the 11th century and until 1803, Fiemme Valley belonged to the county of Trent, part of the Bishopric of Trent within the Holy Roman Empire. After the treaty of Luneville, under the name "Welschtirol" (i.e. Italian-Ladin speaking Tyrol) it became part of the county of Tyrol under the Austrian Empire.

In 1920 with the Treaty of Saint-Germain-en-Laye at the end of the first World War it was annexed to the kingdom of Italy.

== Municipalities ==
The following comuni are located in Fiemme Valley:

- Capriana
- Altrei
- Castello-Molina di Fiemme
- Cavalese (administrative center)
- Tesero
- Ziano di Fiemme
- Panchià
- Predazzo (economical center)
- Valfloriana
- Ville di Fiemme

The valley composes the Avisio's river basin together with Fascia Valley and Val di Cembra.

The area near Cavalese has seen two major cable car disasters, one in 1976 and one, caused by a United States Marine Corps airplane flying too low, in 1998. In 1985, the Val di Stava Dam collapse killed 268 people in Tesero.

== Sports ==
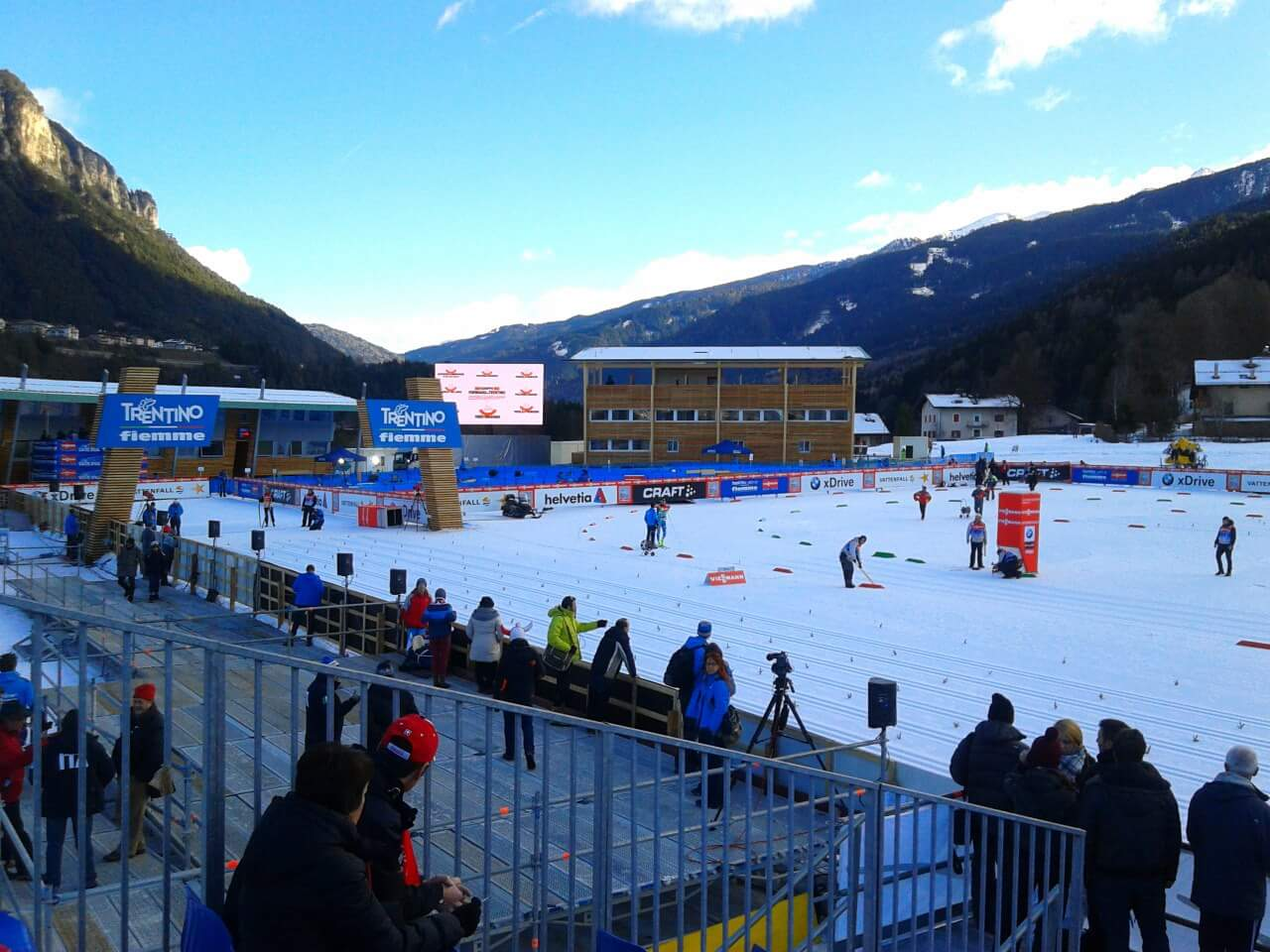
Tour de Ski 2013 at Lago di Tesero Cross Country Stadium.

As a tourist attraction, Fiemme has become well known for its skiing areas, even hosting the FIS Nordic World Ski Championships for both 1991 and 2003. The town hosted the 2013 Championships after being a nominee for the 2011 where it lost out to Oslo. The Tour de Ski has since 2007 had its conclusion in Val di Fiemme with the Final Climb stage up the alpine skiing course on Alpe Cermis.

Fiemme's skiing area is the Val di Fiemme-Obereggen, that is part of the Dolomiti super ski.

== See also ==
- 2026 Winter Olympics
- Lake delle Buse
