= Salorno =

Comune in Trentino-Alto Adige, Italy

Salorno sulla Strada del Vino
- Comune
- Comune di Salorno sulla Strada del Vino; Gemeinde Salurn
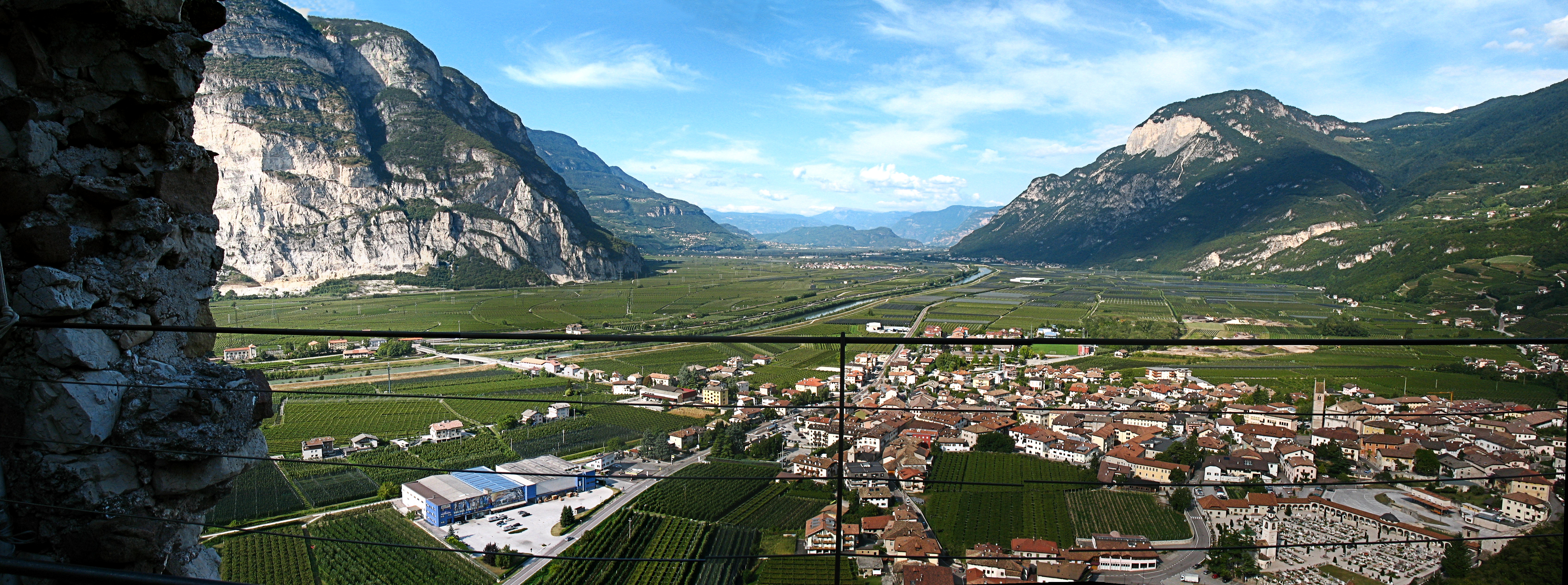
- Salorno in the Adige valley, view from the Haderburg

- Coat of arms

- Location within Italy Location within Trentino-Alto Adige/Südtirol
- Coordinates: 46°14′21″N 11°12′44″E
- Country: Italy
- Region: Trentino-Alto Adige/Südtirol
- Province: South Tyrol (BZ)
- Frazioni: Cauria (Gfrill), Pochi (Buchholz)

Government
  - Mayor: Roland Lazzeri (South Tyrolean People's Party)

Area
  - Total: 33.13 km^{2} (12.79 sq mi)
- Elevation: 224 m (735 ft)

Population (31 December 2021)
  - Total: 3,802
  - Density: 114.8/km^{2} (297.2/sq mi)
- Demonym(s): Italian: Salornesi; German: Salurner
- Time zone: UTC+1 (CET)
  - Summer (DST): UTC+2 (CEST)
- Postal code: 39040
- Dialing code: 0471
- Website: Official website

Salorno sulla Strada del Vino (Italian pronunciation: [saˈlorno]; German: Salurn [saˈlʊrn]) is the southernmost comune (municipality) and a village in South Tyrol in northern Italy, located about 30 kilometres (19 mi) southwest of the city of Bolzano. It is one of only six mainly Italian-speaking municipalities in South Tyrol.

== Geography ==
The village centre is located on a scree in the Adige (Etsch) valley, about 20 kilometres (12 mi) northeast of the city of Trento and about 30 kilometres (19 mi) southwest of Bolzano. Parts of the municipal area belong to the Trudner Horn Nature Park nature reserve, which is part of the Natura 2000 network. Salorno station is a stop on the Brenner Railway line from Innsbruck to Verona.

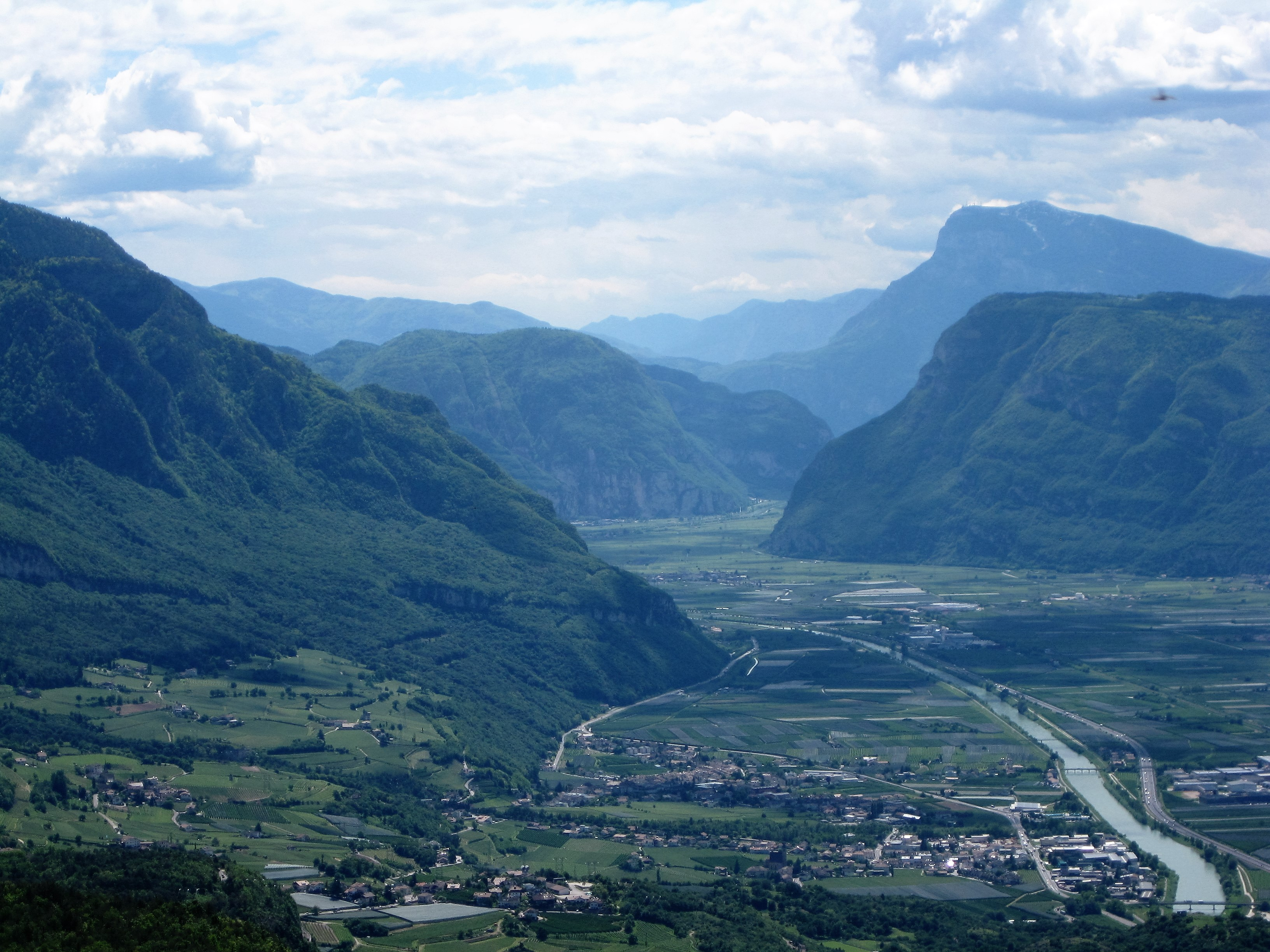
Chiusa di Salorno

In the northwest, Salorno borders the South Tyrolean municipalities of Kurtinig, Margreid, Montan, and Neumarkt. In the east and south it borders the Trentino municipalities of Altavalle, Capriana, Cembra Lisignago, Giovo, Grauno, Grumes, Mezzocorona, Roverè della Luna and Valda. The Chiusa di Salorno (Salurner Klause), a narrow section of the Adige Valley between the Fiemme Mountains and the Nonsberg Group, marks the southern border of the South Tyrolean Unterland. Since about 1600 a German-Italian language border solidified here, a circumstance which received a nationalist emphasis by the 19th century, as referred to in the Bozner Bergsteigerlied.

The municipality contains the frazioni (subdivisions, mainly villages and hamlets) Cauria (German: Gfrill) and Pochi (Buchholz). As of 31 December 2011, Salorno sulla Strada del Vino had a population of 3,591 and an area of 33.2 square kilometres (12.8 mi^{2}).

== History ==
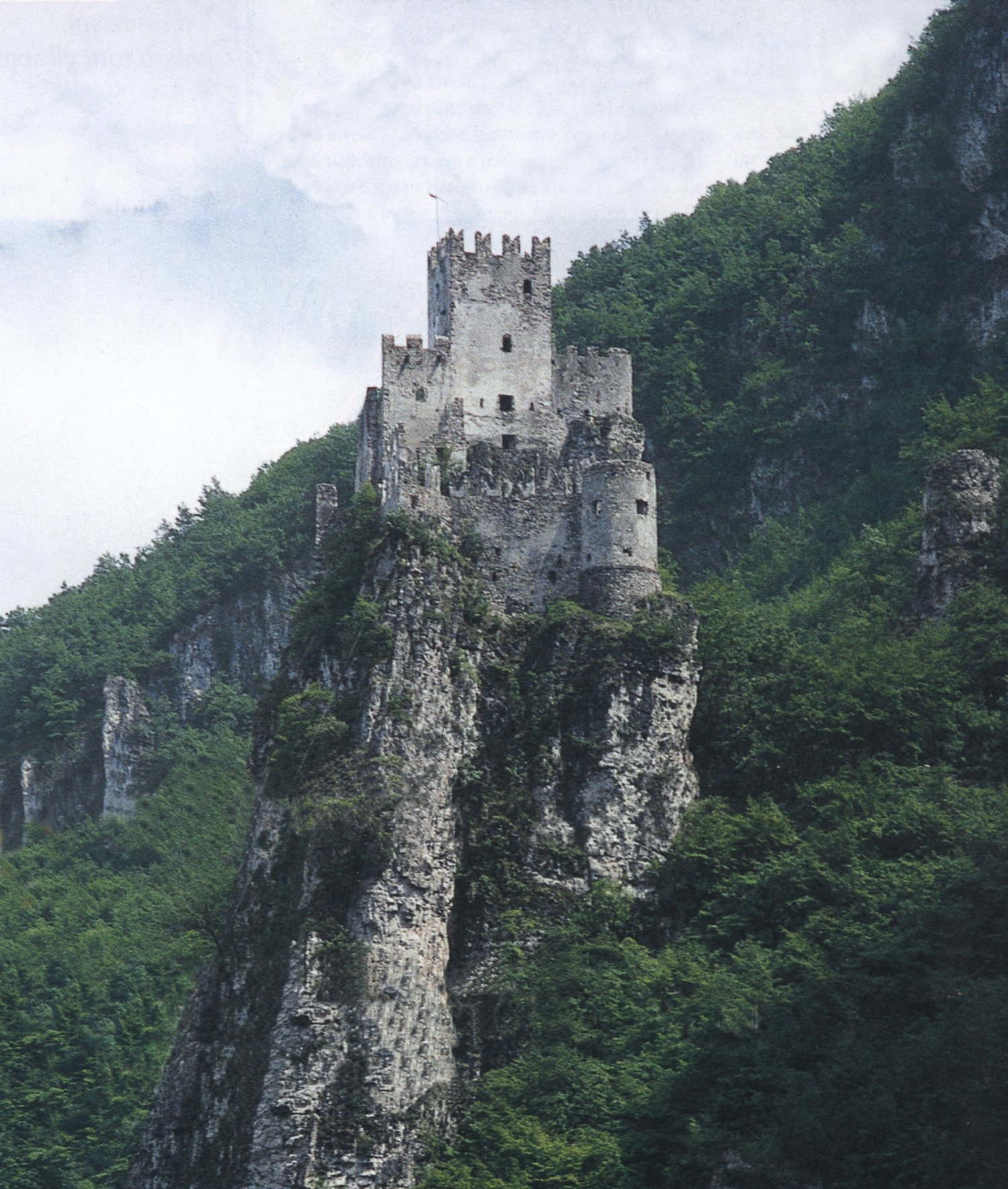
Haderburg Castle.

A Salorno settlement existed as early as the Roman imperial era. Salorno however is first mentioned as part of in the Kingdom of the Lombards in a 580 deed, as Salurnis, during the Rule of the Dukes, when Duke Euin of Trent fought against the Frankish troops of the invading Merovingian kings Guntram and Childebert II.

The village is home to the ruins of the medieval castle Haderburg (Italian: Castello di Salorno). First mentioned in a 1053 travelogue, it is situated on a limestone rock high above the Salurner Klause bottleneck of the Adige Valley. In 1158 the local Counts of Eppan had two cardinals of the Roman Curia on their way to the court of Emperor Frederick Barbarossa attacked and raided. Frederick's cousin Henry the Lion launched a punitive expedition, whereby the castle was demolished. It was rebuilt afterwards and about 1200 was acquired by the Counts of Tyrol. It was purchased by Count Meinhard II of Gorizia-Tyrol in 1284, besieged and occupied by Duke Louis V of Bavaria in 1349, and finally bequested to the Austrian House of Habsburg in 1363. Emperor Maximilian I had the fortifications enlarged, however, the castle lost its strategical significance soon afterwards and decayed. Since 1648 the ruins are in possession of the Venetian counts of Zenobio-Albrizzi.

After World War I and the dissolution of Austria-Hungary, Salorno was annexed to Italy together with the rest of South Tyrol and other areas of the Austrian territory, as consequence of the Treaty of Saint-Germain-en-Laye on 10 October 1920. According to the census of 1921 the majority of the population of Salorno declared themselves as German-speaking. After that a governmental commission adjusted the result by modifying the declaration of people whose family name sounded Italian. Salorno and other municipalities of South Tyrol have since then an Italian-speaking majority. The effective Italianization conducted by the fascist Regime changed definitively the proportion between the languages. Only 37% of the inhabitants speak mainly German today.

== Coat of arms ==
The emblem is argent a pile reversed and chief azure. It is the insignia of the Lords of Graland who obtained the village in the thirteenth century. The emblem was adopted in 1971.

== Society ==
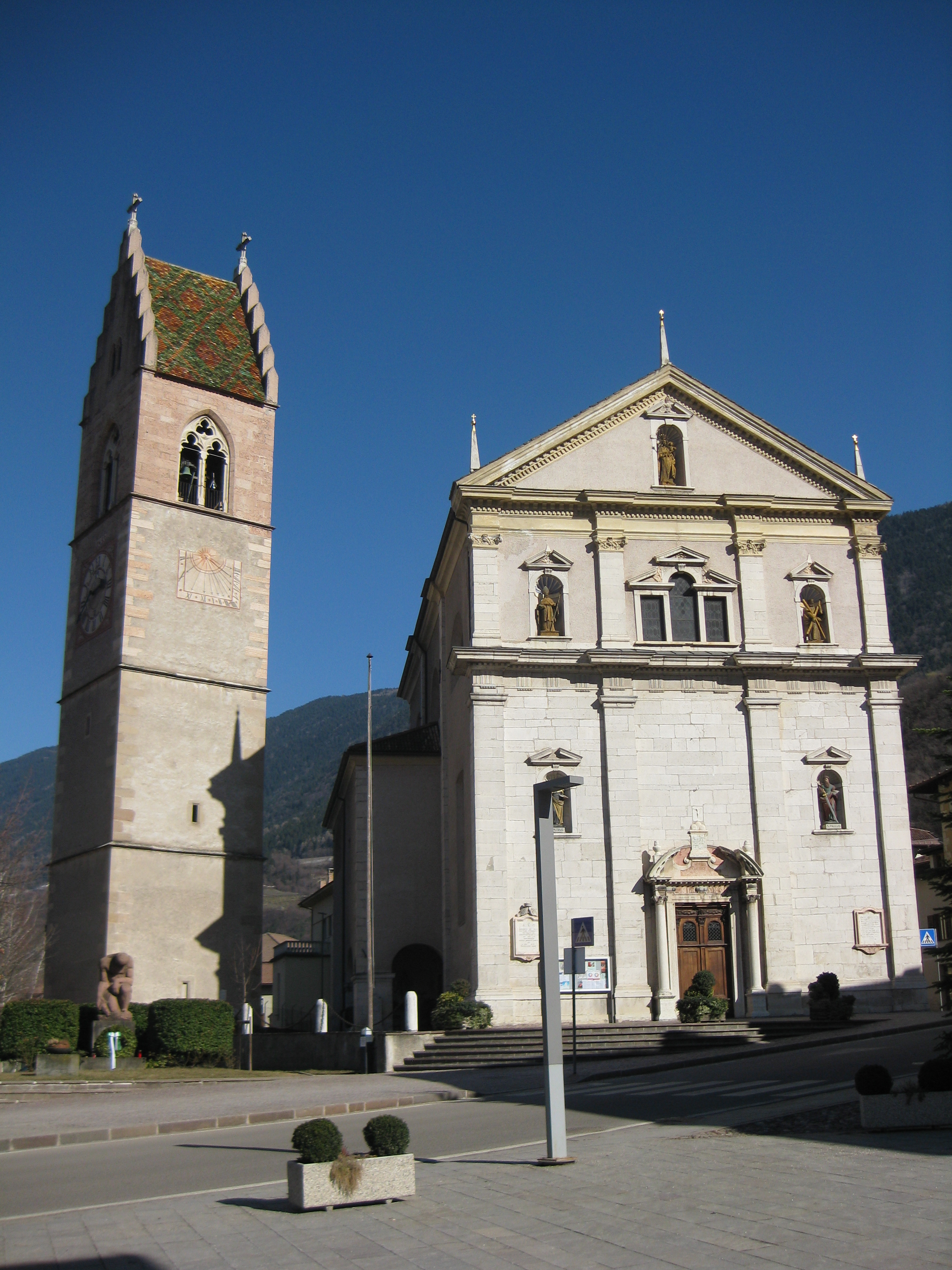
St Andrew Church

=== Linguistic distribution ===
Since 2001, Salorno's population has risen strongly. According to the 2024 census, 62.49% of the population speak Italian, 37.33% German and 0.17% Ladin as first language.

Language	2001	2011	2024
German	37.43%	37.74%	37.33%
Italian	62.19%	61.85%	62.49%
Ladin	0.39%	0.40%	0.17%

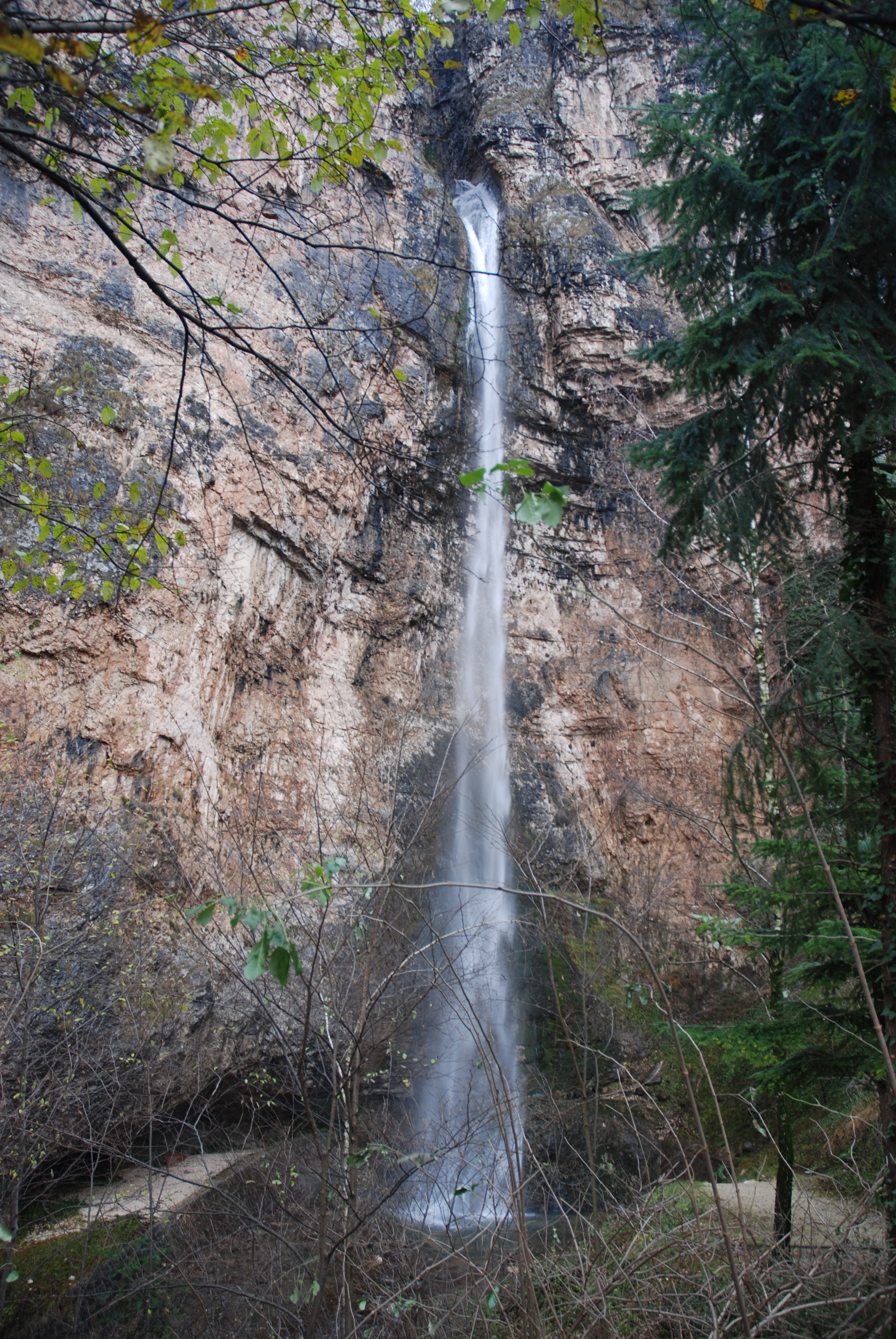
Salorno waterfall.

== People ==
- Franz Philipp Fenner von Fenneberg (1759–1824), distinguished Austria general
- Perkeo of Heidelberg (1702–1735), court jester
- Hartmann von An der Lan-Hochbrunn (1863–1914), composer, organist and director
- Tomas Ress (born 1980), basketball player

== Sources ==
- Stolz, Otto (1946). "Neumarkt und Salurn in ihren Beziehungen zur Tiroler Landesgeschichte". Der Schlern. 20: 292–99.
- Obermair, Hannes (2001). "Soziale Produktion von Recht? Das Weistum des Gerichts Salurn in Südtirol von 1403" (PDF). Concilium medii aevi. 4: 179–208. ISSN 1437-904X.
- Landi, Walter (2010). Haderburg. Die Feste an der Salurner Klause (Burgen, 5). Regensburg: Schnell & Steiner. ISBN 978-3-7954-2163-2.
