= Grauno =

- Frazione
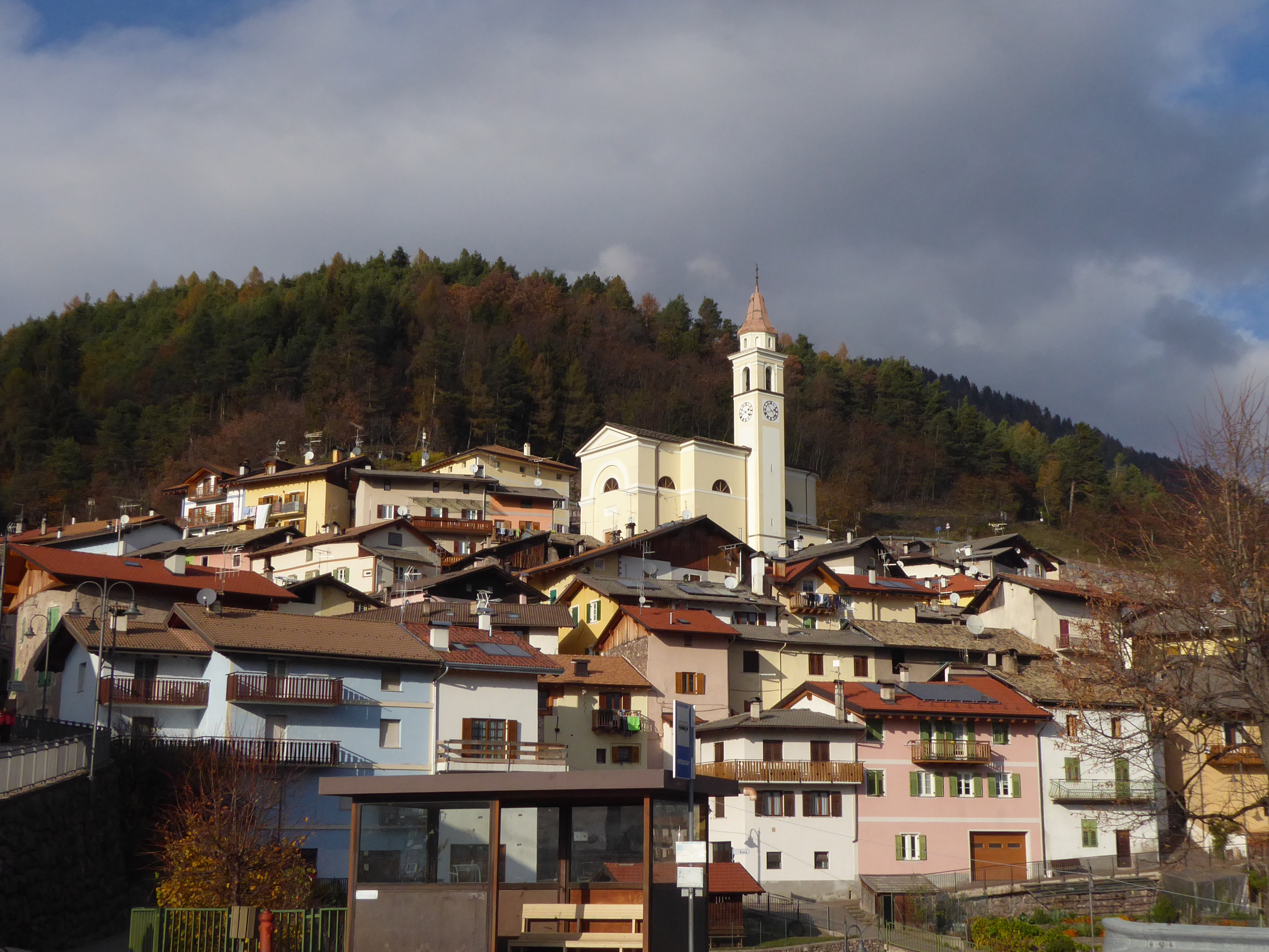
- The village dominated by the parish church of San Martino
- Interactive map of Grauno
- Country: Italy
- Region: Trentino-Alto Adige/Südtirol
- Province: Trentino
- Municipality: Altavalle

Population (31 December 2015)ISTAT
  - Total: 144
- Time zone: UTC+1 (CET)
  - Summer (DST): UTC+2 (CEST)

Grauno (Gràun in the Cembra dialect) is a frazione (hamlet) of the municipality of Altavalle in the Province of Trento, northern Italy. It is located in the upper part of the Valle di Cembra and has a population of 144.

Until 31 December 2015 Grauno was an independent municipality bordering the municipalities of Capriana, Grumes, Salorno (BZ), and Sover. On 1 January 2016 it merged with Faver, Grumes, and Valda to form the new municipality of Altavalle.

== History ==
=== Symbols ===
The coat of arms of Grauno was approved by resolution of the Municipal Council No. 54 on 28 November 1983, adopted by D.G.P. on 27 January 1983, No. 1137/3-B and finally modified by D.G.P. on 6 July 1984, No. 5241.

Per fess abased, in the first, argent, a mount of three green hills, each surmounted by a natural fir tree; in the second, two rows of five checkers, the first in red and silver, the second in silver and red. It shall be adorned with the usual municipal ornaments, namely the municipal mural crown and the laurel and oak branches tied with a golden ribbon.

== Monuments and places of interest ==
In the village stands the parish church of San Martino, dating back to 1863, built on the site of a previous structure dating back perhaps to the 11th century.

== Administration ==
| Period | | Office holder | Party | Title | Notes |
|---|---|---|---|---|---|
| 9 May 2005 | 8 May 2010 | Marco Cristofori | Civic list | Mayor | |
| 9 May 2010 | 31 December 2015 | Ceolan Alfredo | Civic list | Mayor | |
