= Altrei =

- Comune
- Comune di Anterivo; Gemeinde Altrei
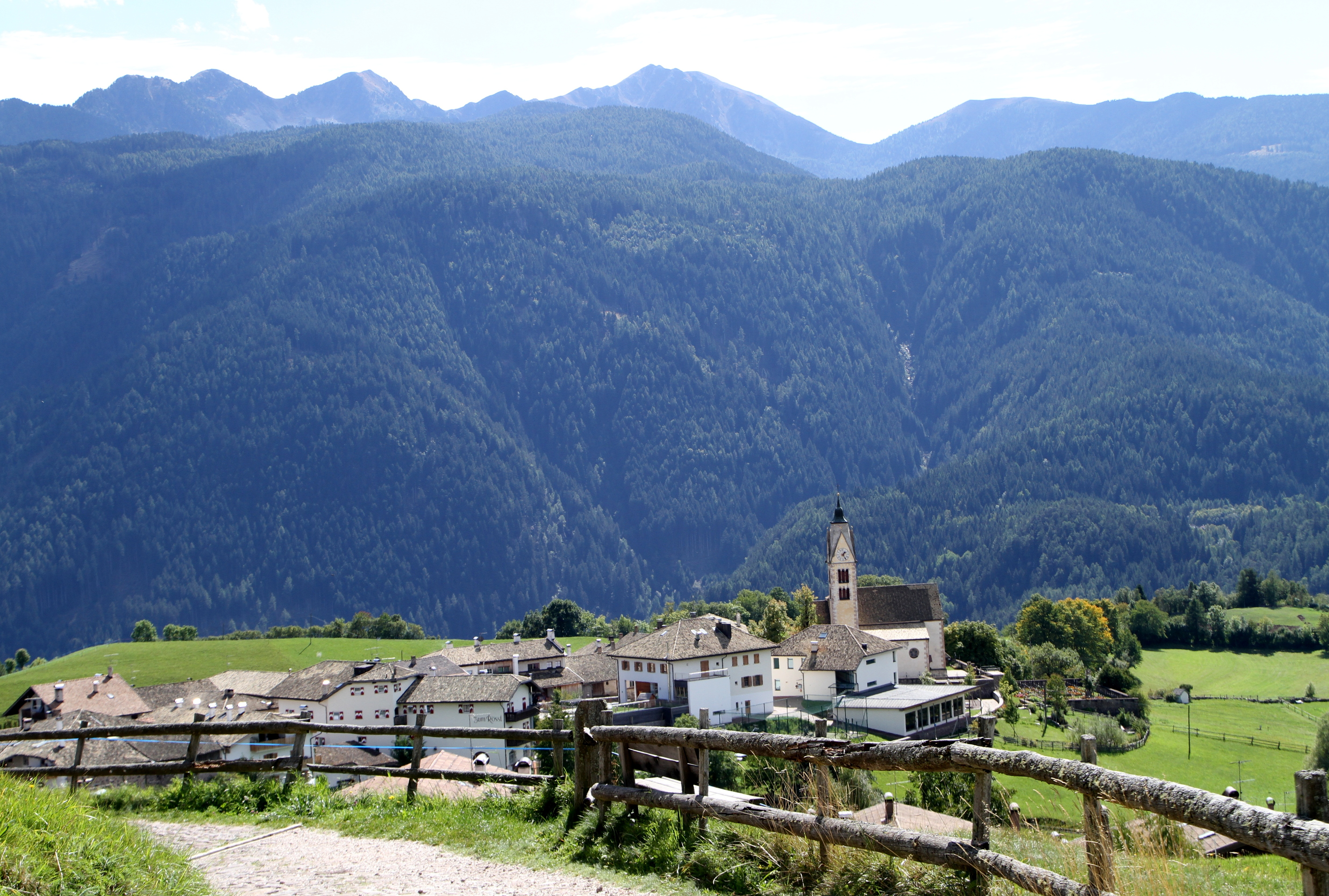
- View of Altrei

- Coat of arms

- Location of Altrei in Italy Altrei (Trentino-Alto Adige/Südtirol)
- Coordinates: 46°17′N 11°22′E
- Country: Italy
- Region: Trentino-Alto Adige/Südtirol
- Province: South Tyrol (BZ)
- Frazioni: Eben (Pramarino), Guggal

Government
  - Mayor: Gustav Mattivi

Area
  - Total: 11.1 km^{2} (4.3 sq mi)

Population (Nov. 2010)
  - Total: 384
  - Density: 34.6/km^{2} (89.6/sq mi)
- Demonyms: German: Altreier; Italian: anterivesi
- Time zone: UTC+1 (CET)
  - Summer (DST): UTC+2 (CEST)
- Postal code: 39040
- Dialing code: 0462
- Website: Official website

Altrei (German: [alˈtraɪ]; Italian: Anterivo [anteˈriːvo]) is a comune (municipality) and a village in South Tyrol in northern Italy.

== Geography ==
Altrei is the only South Tyrolean municipality in the Fiemme Valley of the Southern Limestone Alps, located about 25 kilometres (16 mi) south of Bolzano half-way to the city of Trento. The surrounding communities of Capriana, Carano, Castello-Molina di Fiemme, and Valfloriana in the north, south and east all belong to the Trentino province, except for Truden in the northwest. In the southeast, the Altrei municipal area stretches down to the Avisio valley. Large parts belong to the Trudner Horn Nature Park.

As of 30 November 2010, Altrei had a population of 384 and an area of 11.1 square kilometres (4.3 mi^{2}).

=== Frazioni ===
The municipality contains the frazioni (subdivisions, mainly villages and hamlets) Eben (Pramarino) and Guggal.

=== Linguistic distribution ===
According to the 2024 census, 87.98% of the population speak German, 12.02% Italian as first language.

Language	1991	2001	2011	2024
German	91.69%	91.44%	87.80%	87.98%
Italian	8.31%	8.56%	12.20%	12.02%
Ladin	0%	0%	0%	0%

=== Demographic evolution ===
Historical population

Year	Pop.	±%
1861	?	—
1871	?	—
1881	?	—
1901	?	—
1911	?	—

Year	Pop.	±%
1921	517	—
1931	466	−9.9%
1936	403	−13.5%
1951	435	+7.9%
1961	456	+4.8%

Year	Pop.	±%
1971	456	+0.0%
1981	400	−12.3%
1991	395	−1.2%
2001	387	−2.0%

Source: Data from ISTAT

== History ==
Antereu was first mentioned in a 1321 deed issued by Count Henry of Gorizia-Tyrol, who had the area settled by German peasants. It was part of Henry's successful attempts to encounter the feudal sovereignty of the prince-bishops of Trent in the Fiemme Valley. The remote area remained a Tyrolean possession until in 1779 the Habsburg empress Maria Theresa exchanged it for nearby Tramin in the Etschtal. After the 1803 secularisation, all Fiemme Valley estates were incorporated into the Austrian crown land of Tyrol.

During the Fascist regime, Altrei from 1926 was part of the larger Capriana municipality within the Trentino province; it was again affiliated with South Tyrol according to the First Autonomy Statute of 1948.

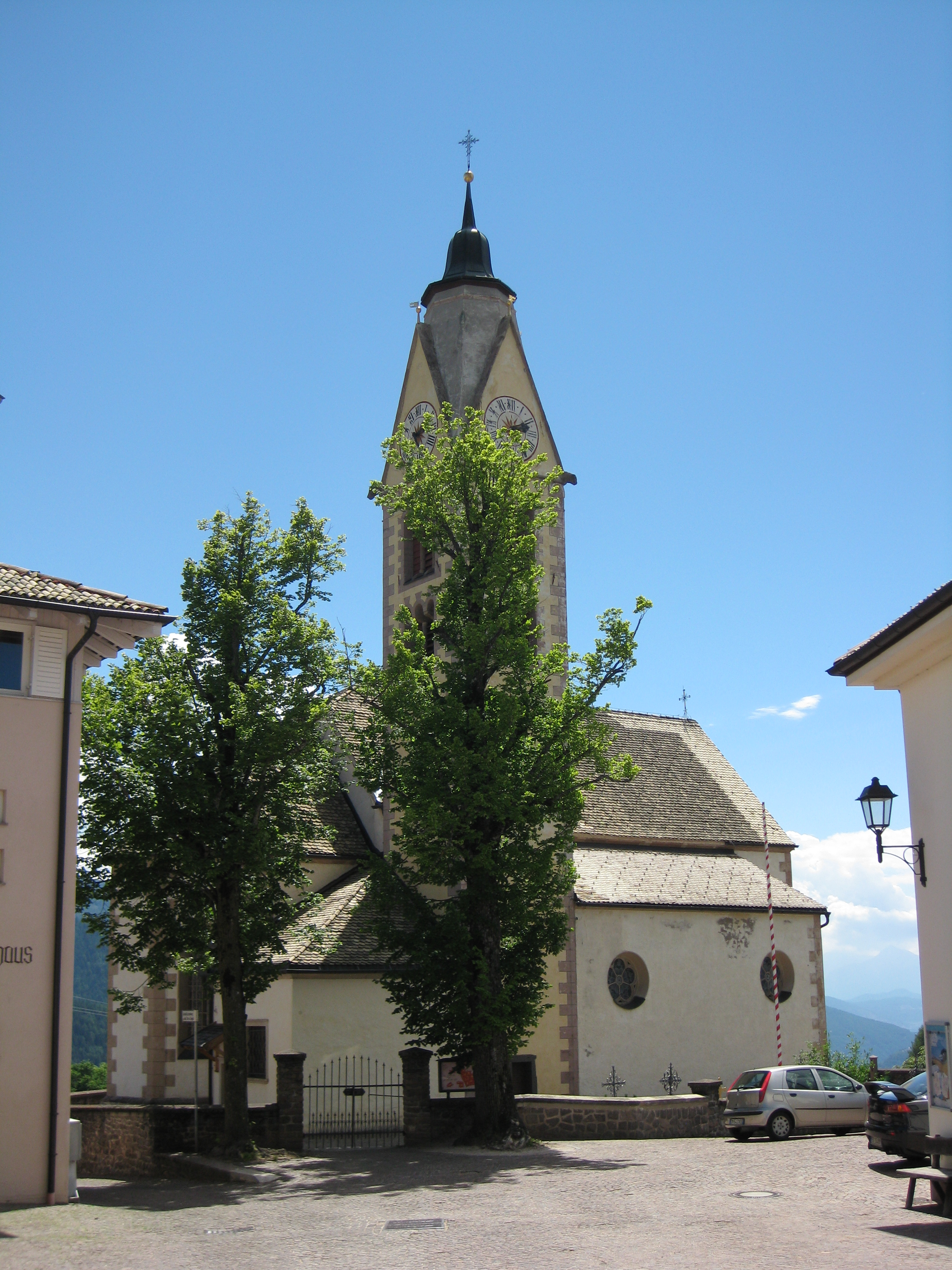
St Catherine's Church

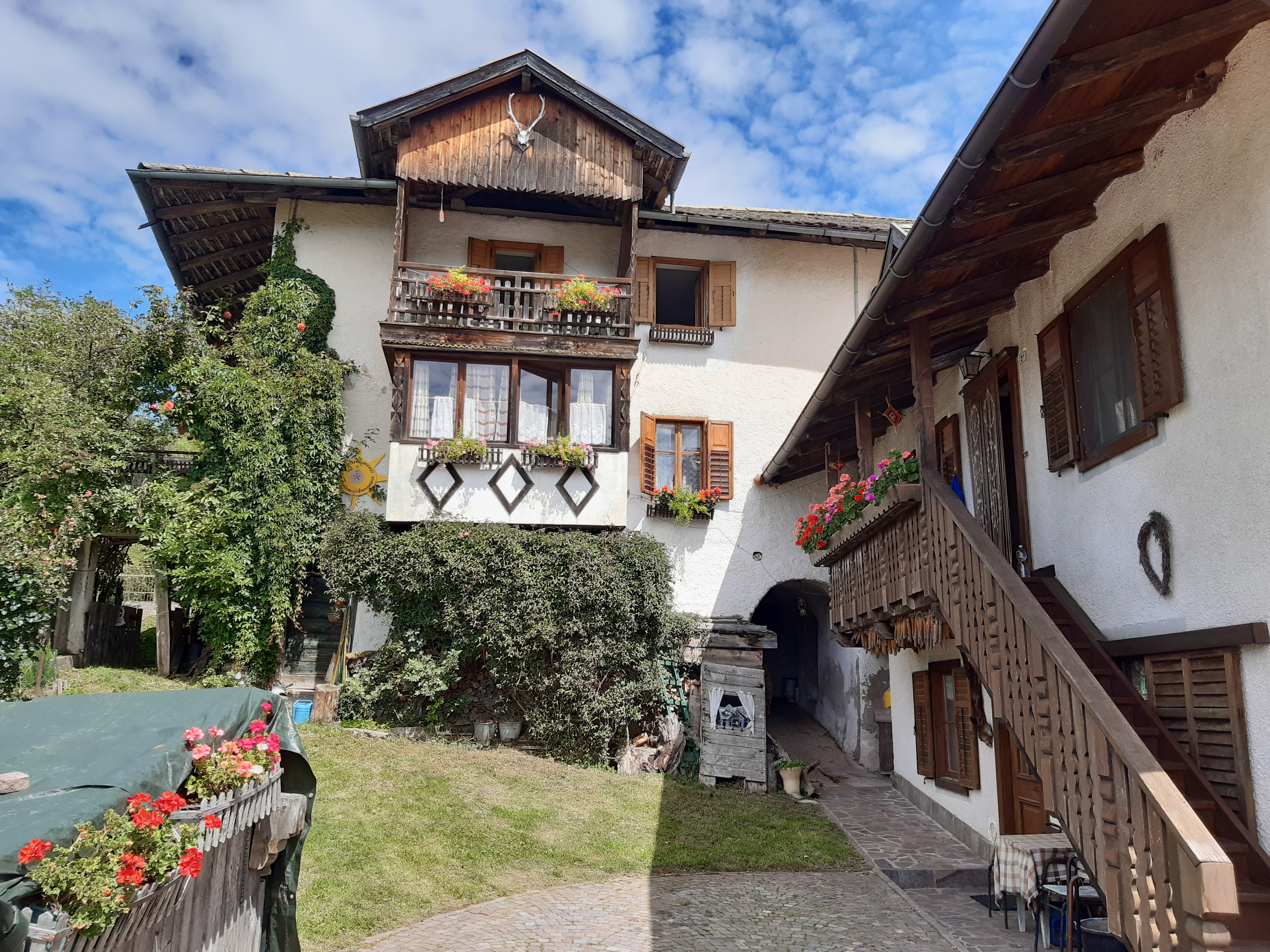
A traditional Südtirol house

=== Coat-of-arms ===
The emblem represents the ten farms built in 1321 that formed the core of Altrei. The shield is party per fess countchanged, each part is divided into five vertical, the colors are sable and argent alternate. The emblem was adopted in 1968.
