= Lagarino bianco =

Variety of grape

Lagarino bianco is a white Italian wine grape variety that is grown in the Trentino-Alto Adige/Südtirol wine region of northeast Italy. It was once thought that the grape was a white berry color mutation or offspring of South Tyrolean grape Lagrein with a weiss Lagrien grape variety reportedly growing near the commune of Bolzano in 1318 but DNA profiling conducted in the early 21st century has shown that the two grape varieties are distinct with no direct relationship to each other.

Lagarino bianco was nearly extinct until viticulturists at the Istituto Agrario di San Michele all’Adige (IASMA) in San Michele all'Adige worked to revive the variety and since 2007 the grape has been listed in the official Italian registry of grape variety. While the grape is not widely cultivated, some producers in the Trentino-Alto Adige/Südtirol region are producing varietal examples of Lagarino bianco.

== History ==
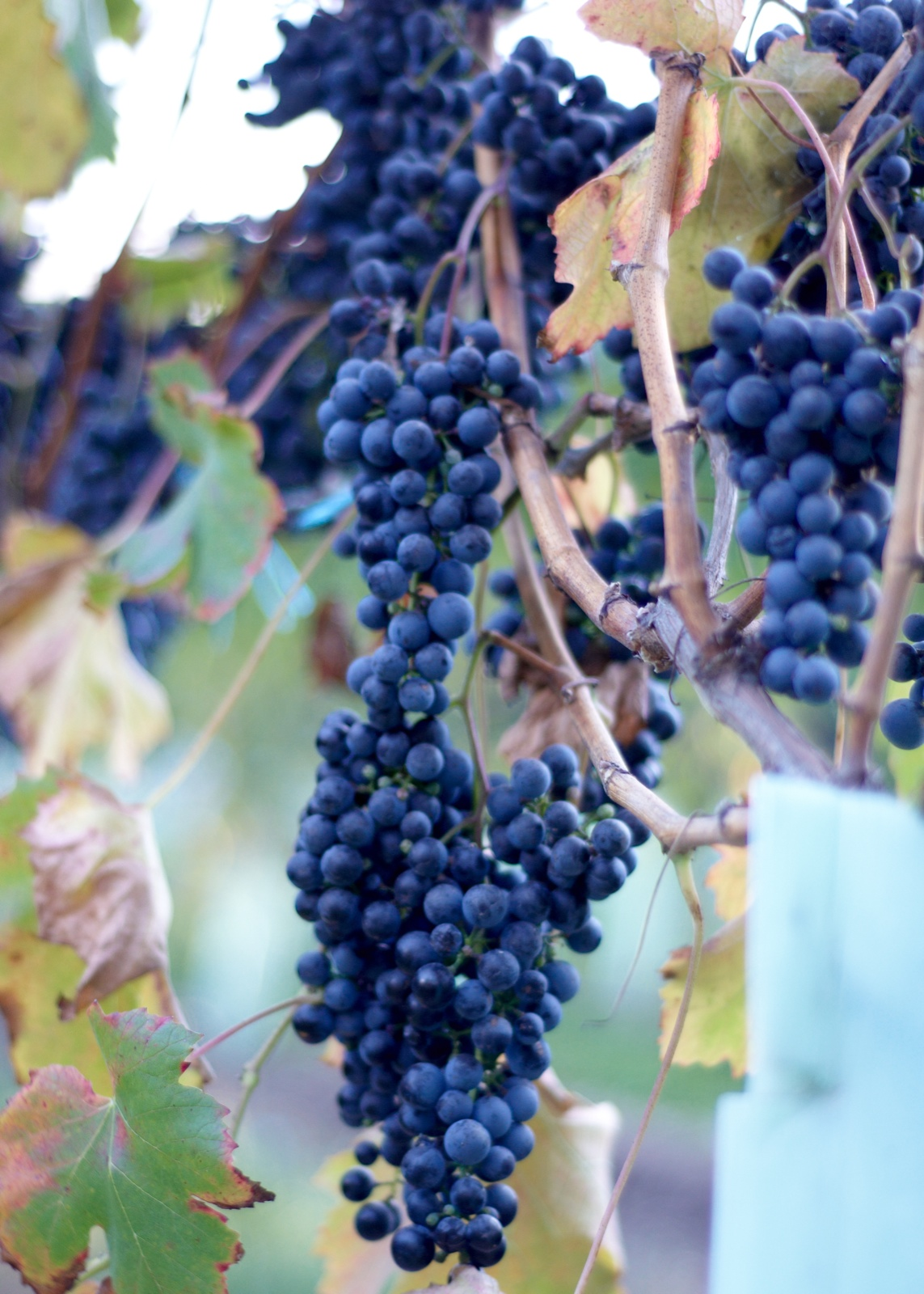
Lagarino bianco was historically thought to be related or a color mutation of Lagrein (pictured) but DNA evidence has proven that the two varieties are distinct and not closely related.

Ampelographers believe that Lagarino bianco is a very old grape variety that originated in the Trentino in the Lagarina Valley from which its name is derived. The same origin has been speculated for the red South Tyrolean grape Lagrein and for many years wine producers believed that the two grapes were somewhat related, either as a color mutation of one or the other (like Pinot noir and Pinot blanc), or through parent-offspring relationship. Evidence for this relationship dates back to early 13th century reports of a weiss Lagrein (White Lagrein) growing around Bolzano with a 1318 document from the Gries-San Quirino district specifying that producers should set aside some weiss Lagrien for the church and for the local poor. Other references to a white Lagrein growing in South Tyrol appear throughout the 14th to 16th century from Tramin an der Weinstraße, Eppan an der Weinstraße, Schenna, Kaltern an der Weinstraße and Terlan.

However, while ampelographers do believe that Lagarino bianco was growing in the Trentino area during this time (with evidence supporting its planting around communes of Cembra, Faver, and Grumes), not all are convinced that these references to weiss Lagrein are referring to Lagarino bianco with some speculating that the Jura wine grape Savagnin (known as Traminer in South Tyrol) being more likely the grape mentioned in these accounts. The connection between Lagarino bianco and Lagrein was further weakened when DNA analysis of the two varieties in the early 21st century showed that not only were the grapes not color mutations or one and another but also have no direct parent-offspring relationship either.

Lagarino bianco was nearly extinct until viticulturists at the Istituto Agrario di San Michele all’Adige (IASMA) in San Michele all'Adige worked to revive the variety. In 2007, IASMA won approval for the grape to listed in the official Italian registry of grape variety where it could be used in the production of wine labeled under specifications for geographical indications and traditional specialties in the European Union such as Denominazione di origine controllata (DOC) and Indicazione geografica tipica (IGT) labeled wines.

== Viticulture ==
Lagarino bianco is an early ripening grape variety that can be vigorous and high yielding if not kept in check with winter pruning and green harvesting later in the growing season. The vine is very winter hardy and has good resistance to be many viticultural hazards such as downy and powdery mildew.

== Wine regions ==
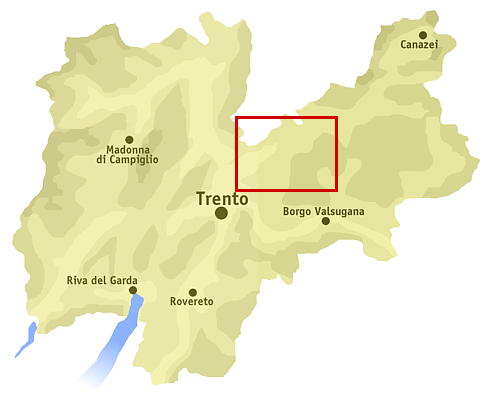
Location of the Val di Cembra in northeast Italy where Lagarino bianco is mostly found.

Today Lagarino bianco is grown almost exclusively in the Trentino province of northeast Italy, particularly along the Val di Cembra and Avisio river basin. Some plantings of the grape are also found in the Sugana Valley around the commune of Pergine Valsugana.

== Styles ==
According to Master of Wine Jancis Robinson, varietal styles of Lagarino bianco being produced in the Trentino-Alto Adige/Südtirol region tend to have crisp acidity and lemon citrus notes.

== Synonyms ==
While ampelographers believe that Lagarino bianco is a very old variety, it has not been known under many synonyms with only Chegarèl and Sghittarella being recognized as known synonyms in the local Trentino dialect.
