= Sover =

Sover Soér
- Comune
- Comune di Sover
- Location within Italy Location within Trentino-Alto Adige/Südtirol
- Coordinates: 46°13′N 11°19′E
- Country: Italy
- Region: Trentino-Alto Adige/Südtirol
- Province: Trentino (TN)
- Frazioni: Montesover, Piscine, Facendi, Piazzoli, Sveseri, Settefontane, Molini, Slosseri, Baiti, Montalto, Fraine, Marigiàt

Government
  - Mayor: Elio Bazzanella

Area
  - Total: 14.7 km^{2} (5.7 sq mi)
- Elevation: 854 m (2,802 ft)

Population (Dec. 2004)
  - Total: 921
  - Density: 62.7/km^{2} (162/sq mi)
- Demonym: Soeri
- Time zone: UTC+1 (CET)
  - Summer (DST): UTC+2 (CEST)
- Postal code: 38048
- Dialing code: 0461
- Patron saint: S.Lorenzo martire
- Website: Official website

Sover (Soér in local dialect) is a comune (municipality) in Trentino in the northern Italian region Trentino-Alto Adige/Südtirol, located about 35 kilometres (22 mi) northeast of Trento.

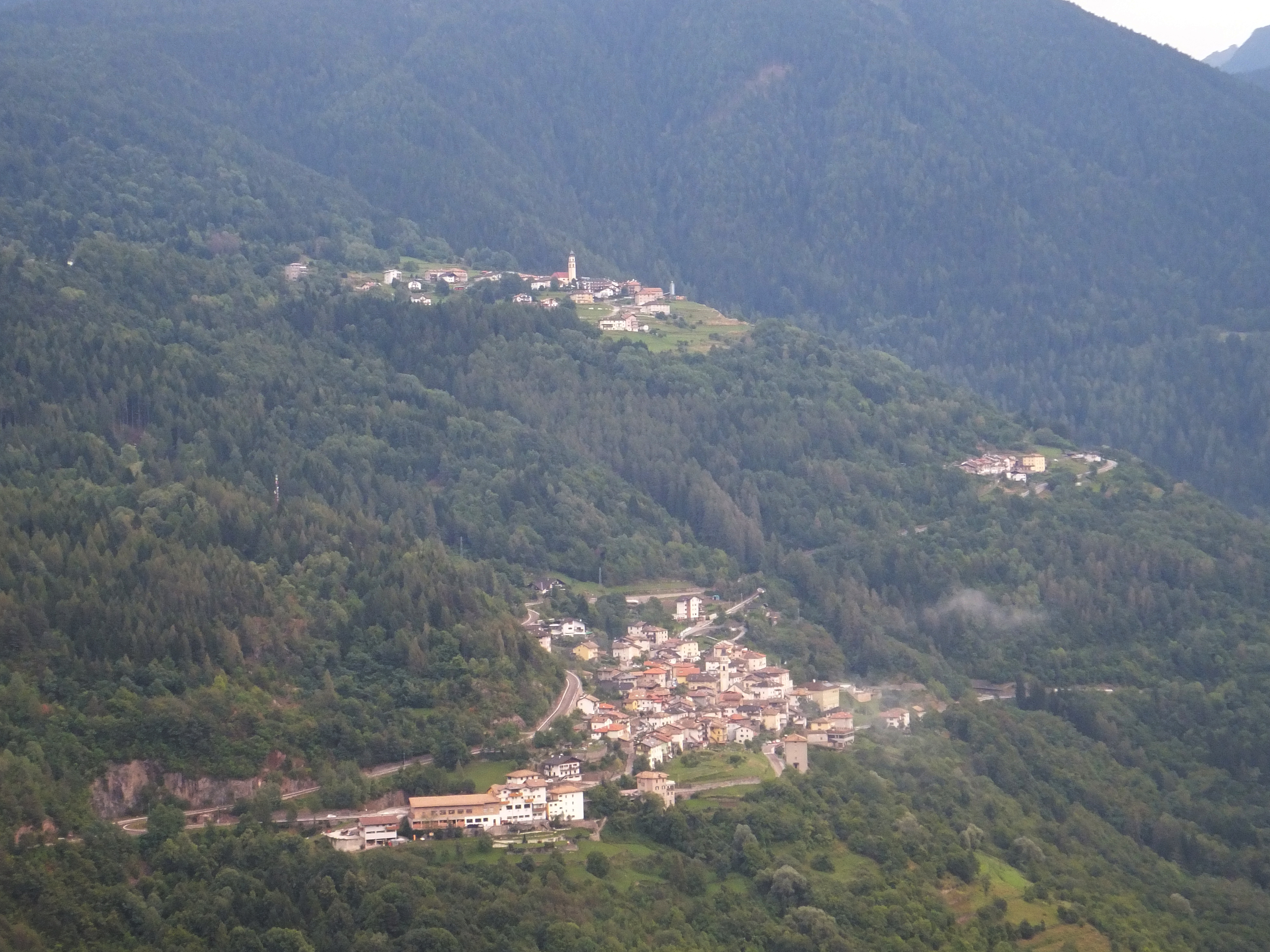
aerial view of Sover

== Geography ==
As of 31 December 2004, it had a population of 921 and an area of 14.7 square kilometres (5.7 sq mi).

The municipality of Sover contains the frazioni (subdivisions, mainly villages and hamlets) Montesover, Piscine, Facendi, Piazzoli, Sveseri and Settefontane.

Sover borders the following municipalities: Capriana, Valfloriana, Grauno, Grumes, Segonzano, Lona-Lases and Bedollo.

== Demographic evolution ==
Historical population

Year	Pop.	±%
1861	?	—
1871	?	—
1881	?	—
1901	?	—
1911	?	—

Year	Pop.	±%
1921	1,566	—
1931	1,430	−8.7%
1936	1,298	−9.2%
1951	1,360	+4.8%
1961	1,284	−5.6%

Year	Pop.	±%
1971	1,090	−15.1%
1981	991	−9.1%
1991	939	−5.2%
2001	904	−3.7%

Source: Data from ISTAT
