= Valda (Altavalle) =

Comune in Trentino, Italy

Coordinates: 46°12′26″N 11°16′00″E

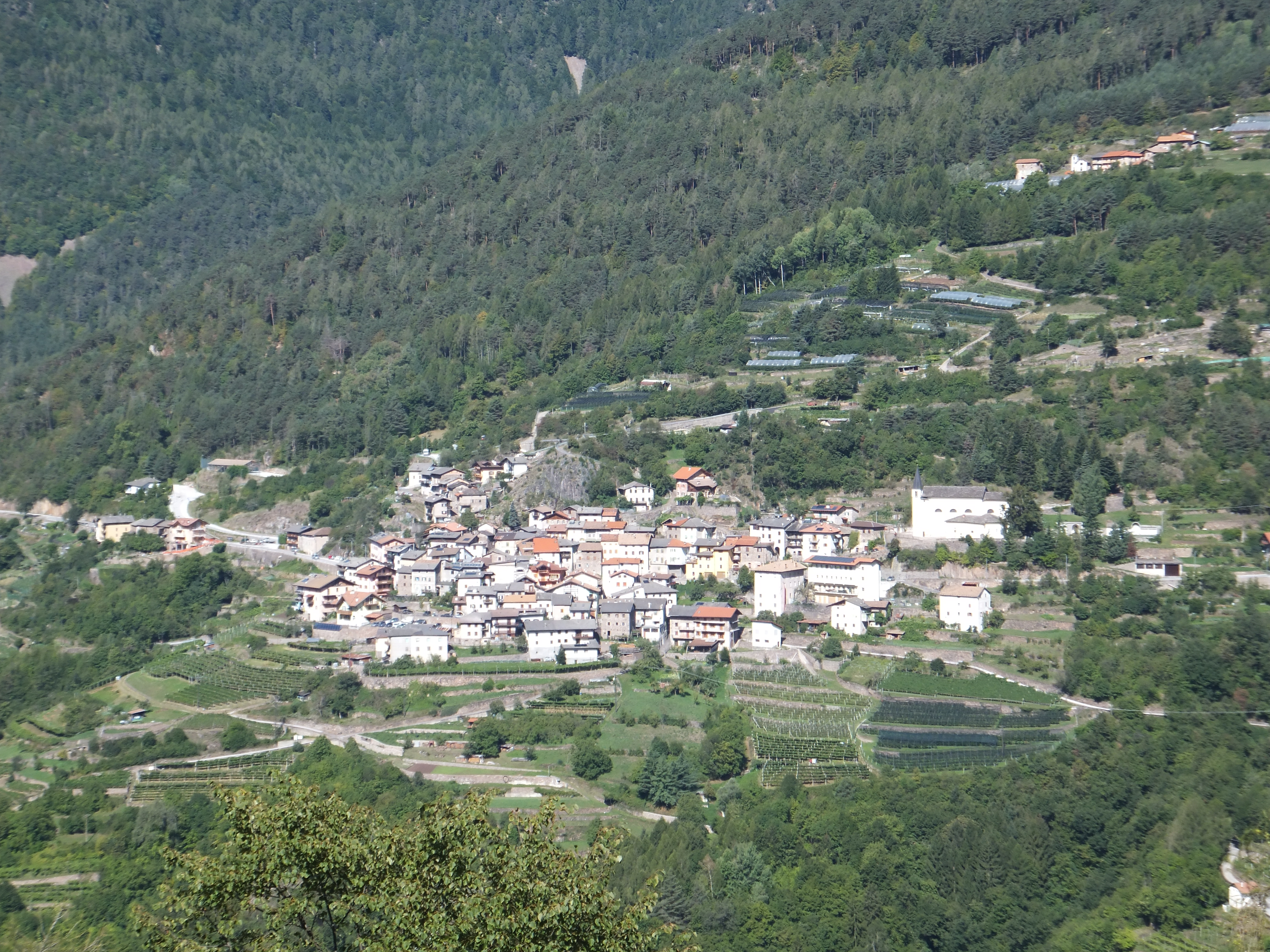
Valda seen from the Sanctuary of Madonna dell'Aiuto, at Segonzano.

Valda (German: Wald im Fasstal) is a frazione of the comune of Altavalle in Trentino in the northern Italian region Trentino-Alto Adige/Südtirol, located about 20 kilometres (12 mi) northeast of Trento.

It was an independent commune until 1 January 2016, when it merged with the hamlets of Faver, Grauno and Grumes to form the municipality of Altavalle.
