= Bedollo =

- Comune
- Comune di Bedollo
- Coat of arms

- Location within Italy Location within Trentino-Alto Adige/Südtirol
- Coordinates: 46°10′N 11°18′E
- Country: Italy
- Region: Trentino-Alto Adige/Südtirol
- Province: Trentino (TN)
- Frazioni: Centrale, Piazze, Brusago, Regnana

Government
  - Mayor: Francesco Fantini

Area
  - Total: 27.4 km^{2} (10.6 sq mi)

Population (2026)
  - Total: 1,500
  - Density: 55/km^{2} (140/sq mi)
- Demonym: Bedoleri
- Time zone: UTC+1 (CET)
  - Summer (DST): UTC+2 (CEST)
- Postal code: 38043
- Dialing code: 0461
- Website: Official website

Bedollo (Bedól in local dialect) is a comune (municipality) in Trentino in the northern Italian region Trentino-Alto Adige/Südtirol, located about 20 kilometres (12 mi) northeast of Trento. As of 31 December 2004, it had a population of 1,406 and an area of 27.4 square kilometres (10.6 mi^{2}).

The municipality of Bedollo contains the frazioni (subdivisions, mainly villages and hamlets) Centrale, Piazze, Brusago, and Regnana.

Bedollo borders the following municipalities: Sover, Segonzano, Lona-Lases, Baselga di Pinè, Palù del Fersina, and Sant'Orsola Terme.

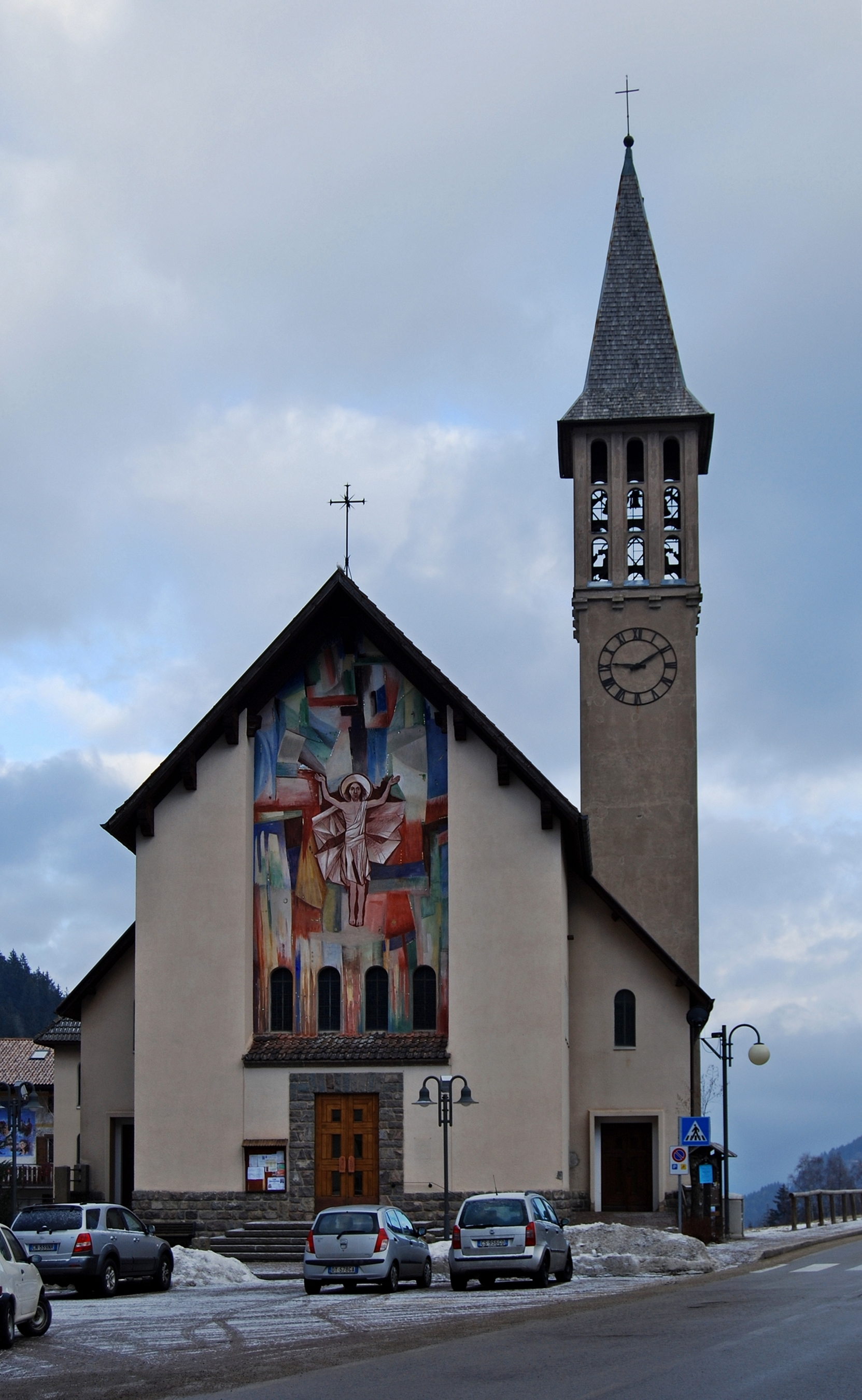
the Parish church

== Demographic evolution ==
Historical population

Year	Pop.	±%
1861	?	—
1871	?	—
1881	?	—
1901	?	—
1911	?	—

Year	Pop.	±%
1921	1,709	—
1931	1,463	−14.4%
1936	1,486	+1.6%
1951	1,719	+15.7%
1961	1,753	+2.0%

Year	Pop.	±%
1971	1,631	−7.0%
1981	1,537	−5.8%
1991	1,436	−6.6%
2001	1,397	−2.7%

Source: Data from ISTAT
