= Lona-Lases =

- Comune
- Comune di Lona-Lases
- Location within Italy Location within Trentino-Alto Adige/Südtirol
- Coordinates: 46°9′N 11°13′E
- Country: Italy
- Region: Trentino-Alto Adige/Südtirol
- Province: Trentino (TN)

Government
  - Mayor: Antonio Giacomelli

Area
  - Total: 11.4 km^{2} (4.4 sq mi)

Population (2026)
  - Total: 882
  - Density: 77.4/km^{2} (200/sq mi)
- Demonym: Lasesi
- Time zone: UTC+1 (CET)
  - Summer (DST): UTC+2 (CEST)
- Postal code: 38040
- Dialing code: 0461
- Website: Official website

Lona-Lases (Lóna e Lasés in local dialect) is a comune (municipality) in Trentino in the northern Italian region Trentino-Alto Adige/Südtirol, located about 12 kilometres (7 mi) northeast of Trento. As of 31 December 2004, it had a population of 768 and an area of 11.4 square kilometres (4.4 mi^{2}).

Lona-Lases borders the following municipalities: Valfloriana, Sover, Segonzano, Cembra, Bedollo, Baselga di Pinè, Albiano and Fornace.

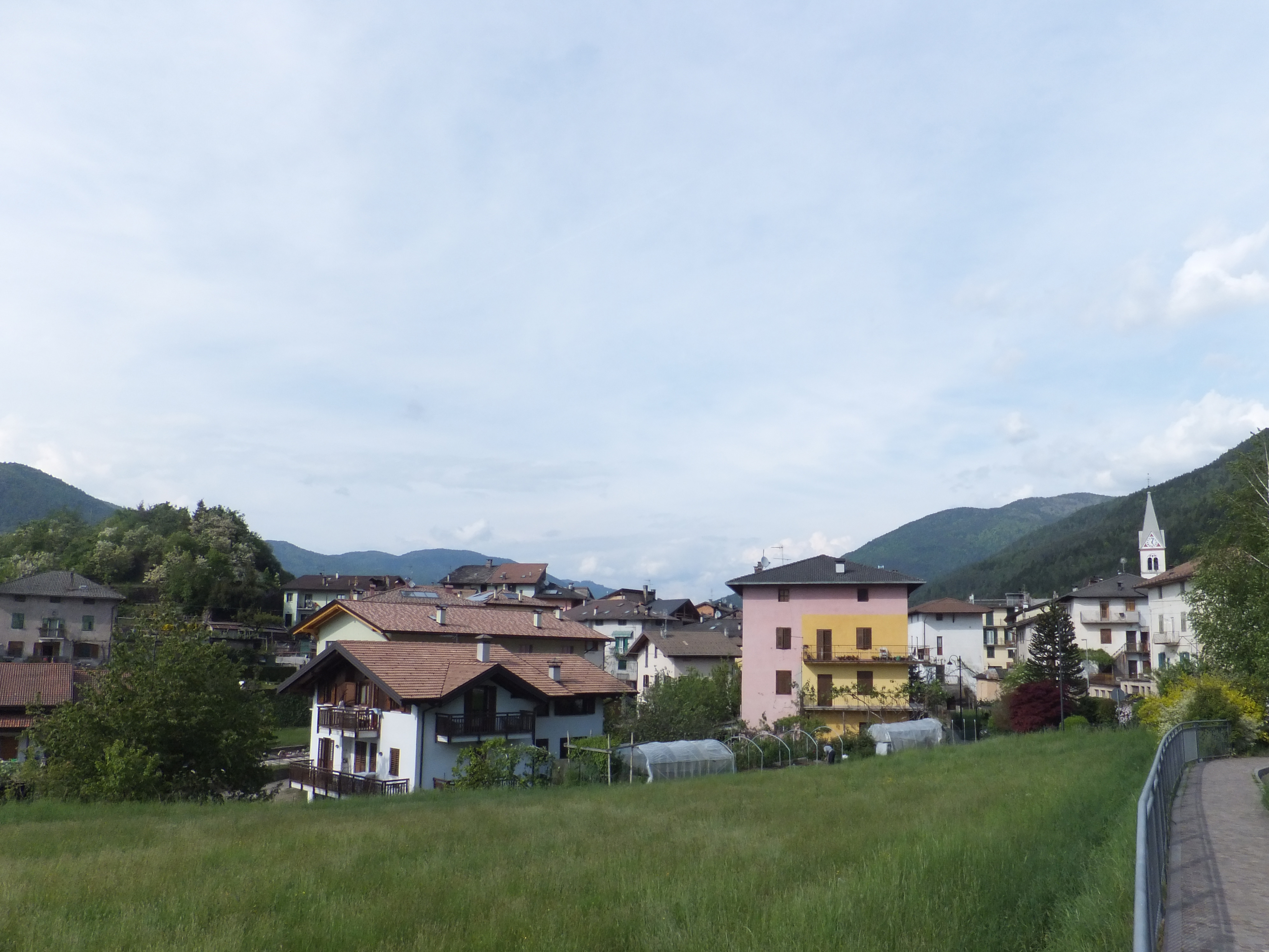
the town in spring

== Demographic evolution ==
Historical population

Year	Pop.	±%
1861	?	—
1871	?	—
1881	?	—
1901	?	—
1911	?	—

Year	Pop.	±%
1921	848	—
1931	717	−15.4%
1936	768	+7.1%
1951	704	−8.3%
1961	719	+2.1%

Year	Pop.	±%
1971	699	−2.8%
1981	711	+1.7%
1991	650	−8.6%
2001	729	+12.2%

Source: Data from ISTAT
