= Franz Philipp Fenner von Fenneberg =

Austrian baron (1759–1824)

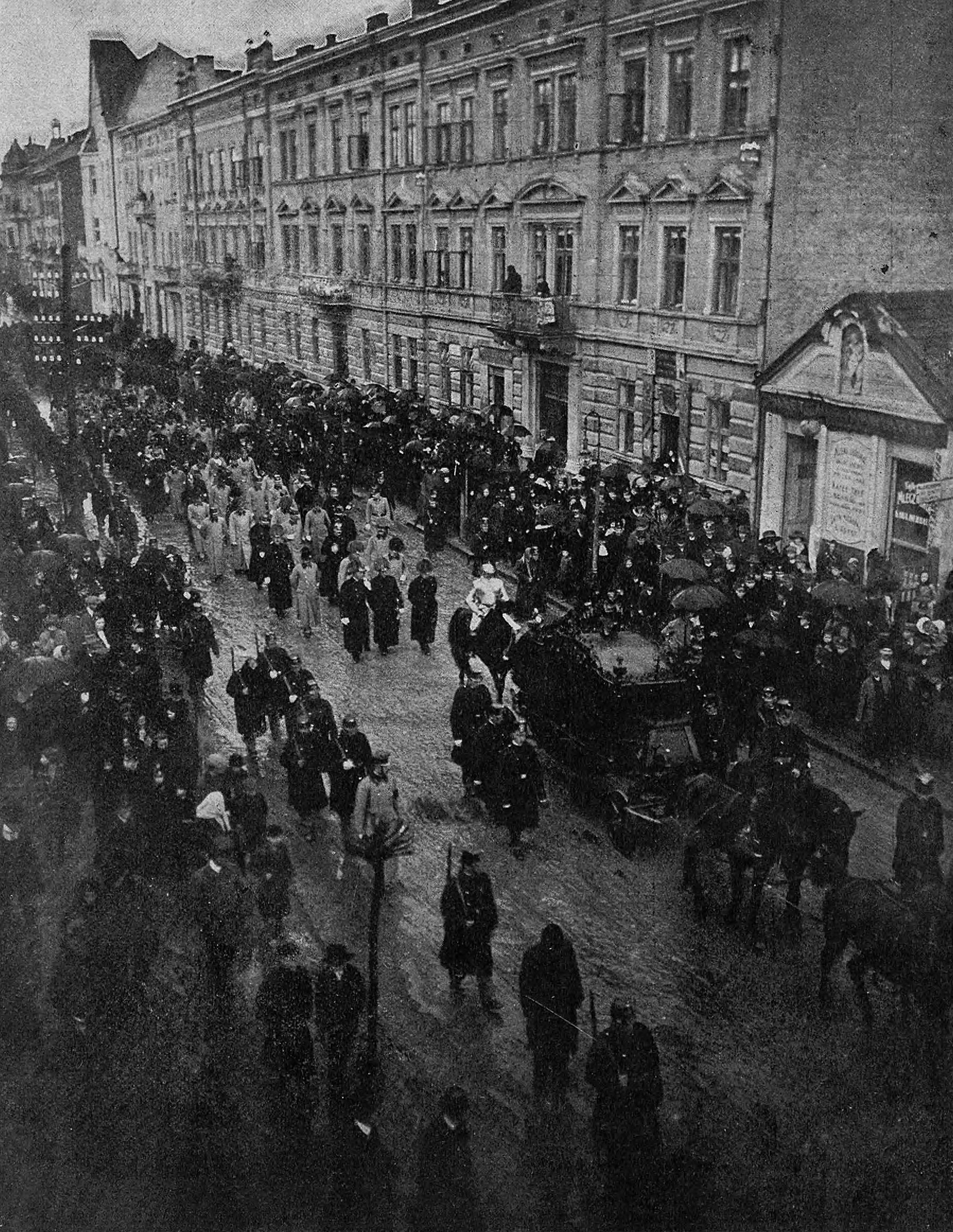
Exporta in Jarosław (1913)

Baron Franz Philipp Fenner von Fenneberg (1759–1824) was a Field Marshal Lieutenant in the Austrian Army.

Fenner von Fenneberg was born on 10 July 1759 in Salurn (now Salorno), Tyrol, today South Tyrol in Italy. In several sources his year of birth is given as 1762. His actual place of birth was on the Fennberg mountain (Italian: Favogna), which at that time belonged to Salurn and which, today, lies within the municipality of Margreid.

Fenner von Fenneberg joined the Austrian Imperial Army in 1777 and fought in various European theatres of war. In 1809, as a major general, he distinguished himself in the defence of the Tyrol during the War of the Fifth Coalition. On 8 November 1814, he was awarded the Knight's Cross of the Military Order of Maria Theresa for his services in the war of liberation against the French. The Tyrolean Jäger Regiment, which was dissolved in 1815, was initially to be re-formed as the "Tirolean Fenner Jäger", but in 1816 was given the name Tyrolean Kaiserjäger.

Fenner von Fennberg died 19 October 1824 at Jaroslau (now Jarosław), while still serving as a divisional general in Galicia in Eastern Europe. In 1913 his remains were exported from Jarosław to Tirol.

== Literature ==
- Wilhelm Edler von Janko (1877). "Fenner von Fenneberg, Franz Philipp Freiherr" . Allgemeine Deutsche Biographie (in German). Vol. 6. Leipzig: Duncker & Humblot. pp. 620–621.
- Constantin von Wurzbach: "Fenner von Fenneberg, Franz Philipp Freiherr." In: Biographisches Lexikon des Kaiserthums Oesterreich (Biographical Lexicon of the Empire of Austria). Part 4 Verlag der typogr.-literar.-artist. Anstalt (L. C. Zamarski, C. Dittmarsch & Comp.), Vienna 1858, p. 176 (digitalised).
