= Maria Domenica Lazzeri =

Italian mystic

Venerable Maria Domenica Lazzeri
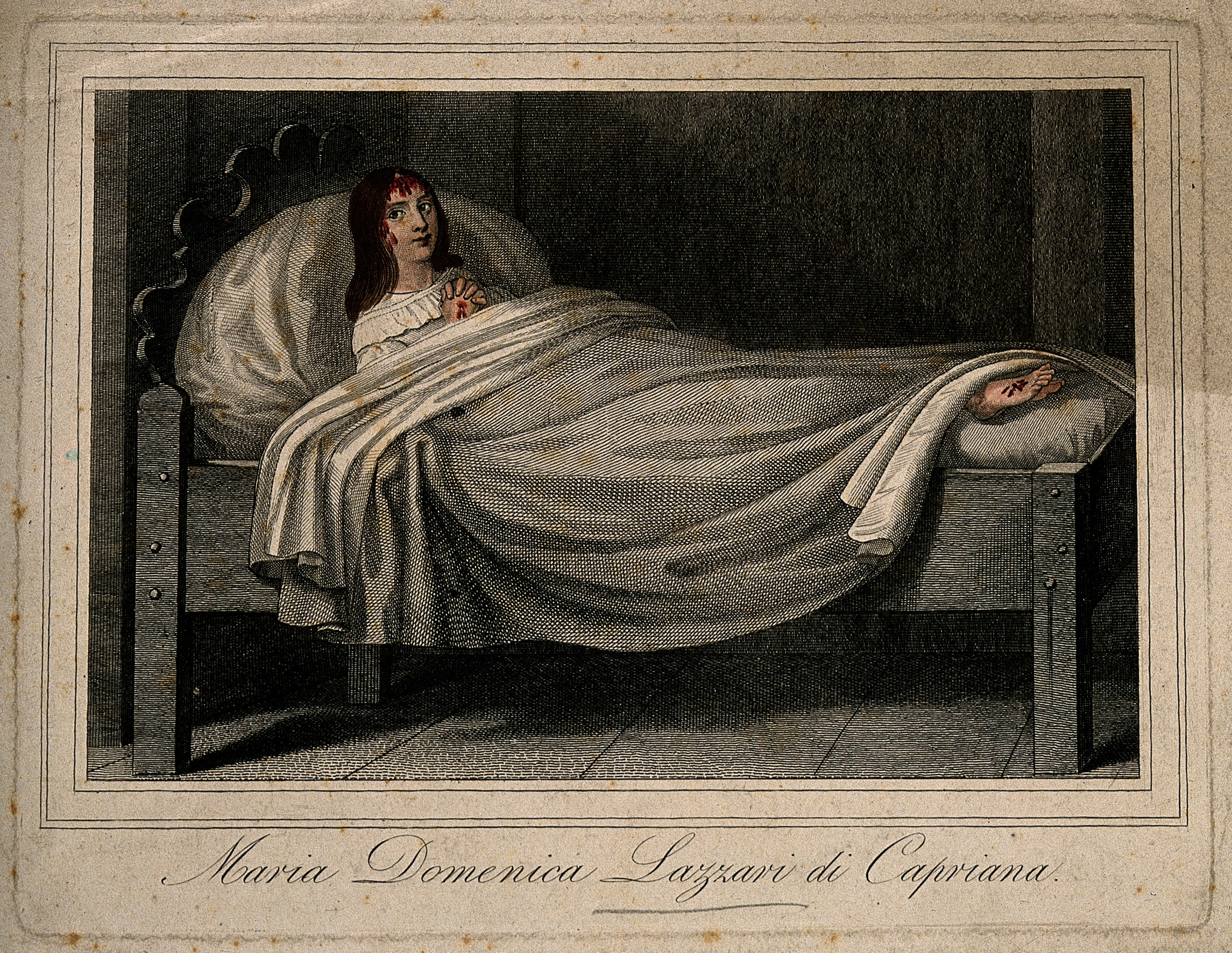
- Illustration of Maria Domenica Lazzeri
- Born: May 16, 1815; Capriana, Italy
- Died: April 4, 1848 (aged 32)

Maria Domenica Lazzeri (1815–1848) also known as "la Meneghina" was an Italian mystic. She would become the most famous stigmatic of Tyrol. The cause for her beatification was started in 1995.

== Life ==
Maria Domenica Lazzeri was born on 16 May 1815 in Capriana, Italy. She is known as "l'addolorata di Capriana" ("the sorrowful woman of Capriana"). She worked as a farmer on her father’s land until she contracted an incurable disease.

After her father's death in 1829, her health began to deteriorate, and as of 1833 she became bedridden. She reported that on 17 December 1834, after a Marian vision, the visible signs of the Passion appeared on her body. According to her physician, she ate and drank nothing for the last 14 years of her life except for receiving Holy Communion. In 1835 she received the stigmata, and shortly after, the crown of thorns. She is frequently depicted with her hands joined bleeding as she lays upon her bed. She died on 4 April 1848. Her cause for beatification was formally reopened in 1995 and she was declared venerable in 2023.

== Sources ==
- Pino Loperfido (2020). La manutenzione dell'universo: il curioso caso di Maria Domenica Lazzeri [The maintenance of the universe: the curious case of Maria Domenica Lazzeri] (in Italian) (3 ed.). Trento: Curcu & Genovese. ISBN 978-88-6876-246-9. OCLC 1352502568.
- Guido Sommavilla Maria Domenica Lazzeri San Paolo Press 1996 ISBN 88-215-3146-5
