= Hartmann von An der Lan-Hochbrunn =

Austrian priest and composer (1863–1914)

Hartmann von An der Lan-Hochbrunn, O.F.M.
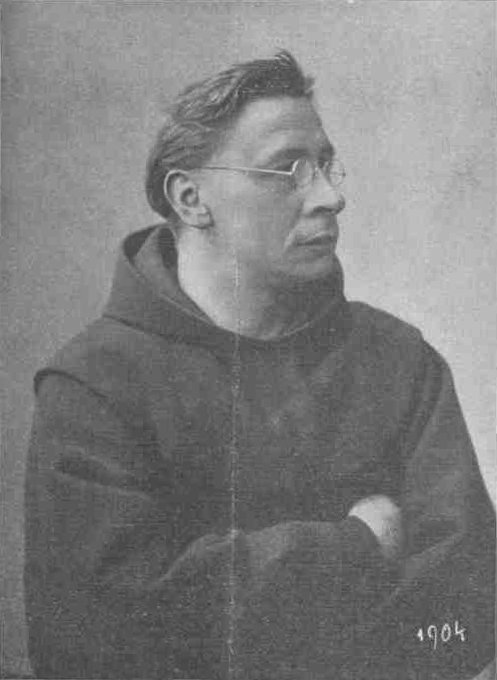
- Born: Paul Eugen Josef von An der Lan-Hochbrunn; 21 December 1863
- Died: 6 December 1914 (aged 50)
- Occupations: Franciscan friar, Catholic priest, composer, organist and conductor
- Era: Romantic
- Works: Works

Hartmann von An der Lan-Hochbrunn OFM (21 December 1863 – 6 December 1914) was an Austrian Catholic priest, composer, organist, and conductor.

== Life ==
He was born Paul Eugen Josef von An der Lan-Hochbrunn in Salorno, County of Tyrol, descended from an ancient noble Tirolean family. His father was a railway officer in Salorno. He completed his first musical studies at the Academy of Bolzano. In 1880, he joined the Order of Friars Minor (better known as the Franciscan friars) at the age of sixteen at their novitiate in Salzburg, where he received his religious name of Hartmann. He was ordained to the Catholic priesthood in 1886 in Brixen. After serving as organist and choir director in Lienz and Reutte, he then studied in Innsbruck with Josef Pembauer.

In 1893 Lan-Hochbrunn was sent to the Holy Land, where he became organist at the Monastery of Saint Saviour and director of the Philharmonic Orchestra in Jerusalem, and from 1894 organist at the Church of the Holy Sepulchre there.

In 1895, Lan-Hochbrunn went to Rome, where he worked as organist at the Franciscan Basilica of Santa Maria in Ara Coeli on the Capitoline Hill and from 1901 as director of the conservatory on the Piazza Santa Chiara. In the same year, he gave a concert tour to Saint Petersburg for the world premiere of his oratorio San Francesco. In addition to other honors he was member of the Roman circle of the 24 Immortali.

From 1906 till his death in 1914, Lan-Hochbrunn lived at the Franciscan Monastery of St. Anna im Lehel near Munich – with a brief interruption in 1906/07, during which he stayed in New York City.

== Works ==
Lan-Hochbrunn wrote mainly sacred works. The most important are:

- San Pietro (Oratorium in three parts), Milan 1900
- San Francesco (Oratorium in three parts), Milan and St. Petersburg 1901
- Das letzte Abendmahl (Oratorium in two parts), Milan 1904, Würzburg 1905
- Der Tod des Herrn (Oratorium in two parts), Milan und Amberg 1906
- Die sieben letzten Worte Christi am Kreuze (Oratorium in two parts), Brooklyn/New York 1908
- Te Deum (Oratorium in three parts), Milan and Muenchen 1913.
- Liturg. Choral-Leitmotiv-Mass, Augsburg - Wien 1909
- Mass for 2 Singst. and organ, 1903
- Requiem for Men's chorus, Milan 1913
- Miserere for 6 voices mixed choir, 1904
- Ave Maria for mixed choir, 1905
- Rosenkranzlieder for 4 voices gem. mixed choir and organ, Augsburg 1903
- Zwei Kirchenstücke für Gesang und Begleitung (Tantum ergo, Ave Maria)

In addition, there are an organ sonatas and piano pieces.

Lan-Hochbrunn is also the author of the following documents:

- Das wunderthätige Jesukind von Aracöli in Rom, known as "Santo Bambino", Munich 1897
- P. Peter Singer. Ein Gedenkblatt zum hundertsten Geburtstage des Künstlers, zugleich ein Beitrag zur Musikgeschichte des 19. Jahrhunderts, Innsbruck 1910
