= Etschtal =

Alpine valley region in Italy

Coordinates: 46.07°N 11.12°E

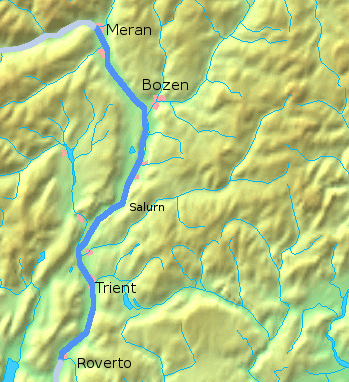
Etschtal stretching from Merano to Bolzano and from Salorno to Rovereto

The Etschtal, Italian: Val d'Adige or Valle dell'Adige, is the name given to a part of alpine valley of the Adige in Trentino-Alto Adige, which stretches from Merano to Bolzano and from Salorno to Rovereto.

South of Rovereto, the valley's name changes to Vallagarina, but Val d'Adige is often used to define the whole river valley, up to its entrance into the Padan Plain.

The valley separates: at the top, the Alps (to the West) from the Dolomites (to the East); at the bottom the Pre-Alps and Lake Garda (to the West) from the Venetian pre-Alps (to the East).

== Images ==
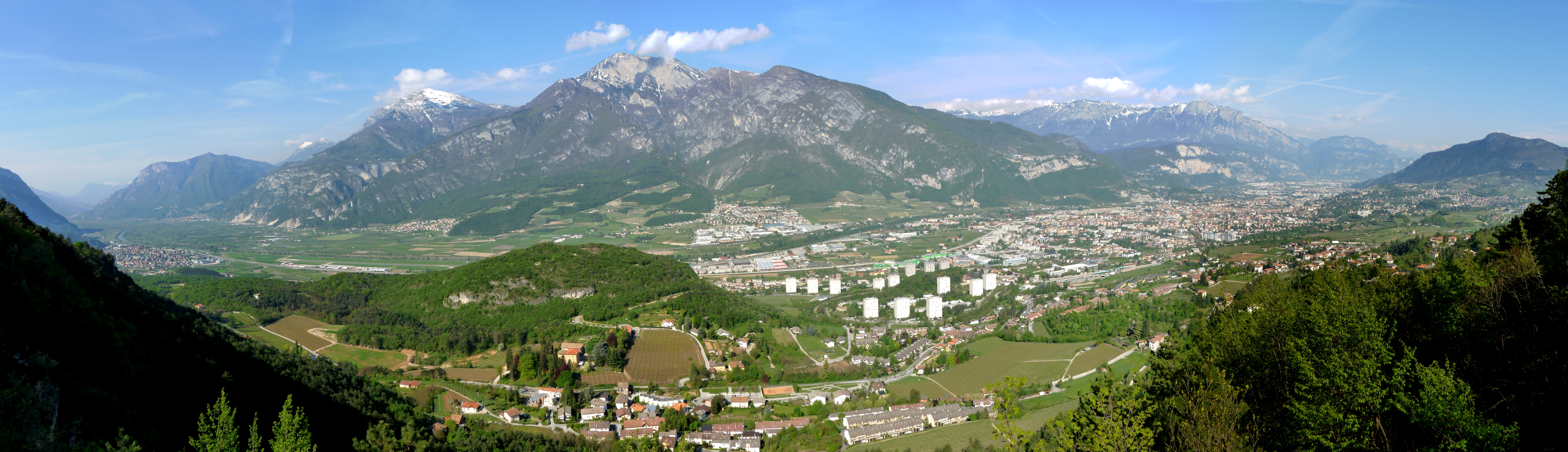
Panorama from the Pino Prati mountain hut (670 metres (2,200 ft) above sea level), in the Bindesi zone on the eastern side of the Adige valley.

A view of the Adige valley from the Hotel Garni Vigilhof near the city of Merano.	A view of the northern Adige valley.

Gampen Pass, east ramp, view at Tisens and Etschtal.	A view of the Adige valley from Merano to Bolzano.
