= Valfloriana =

Valfloriana Bob
- Comune
- Comune di Valfloriana
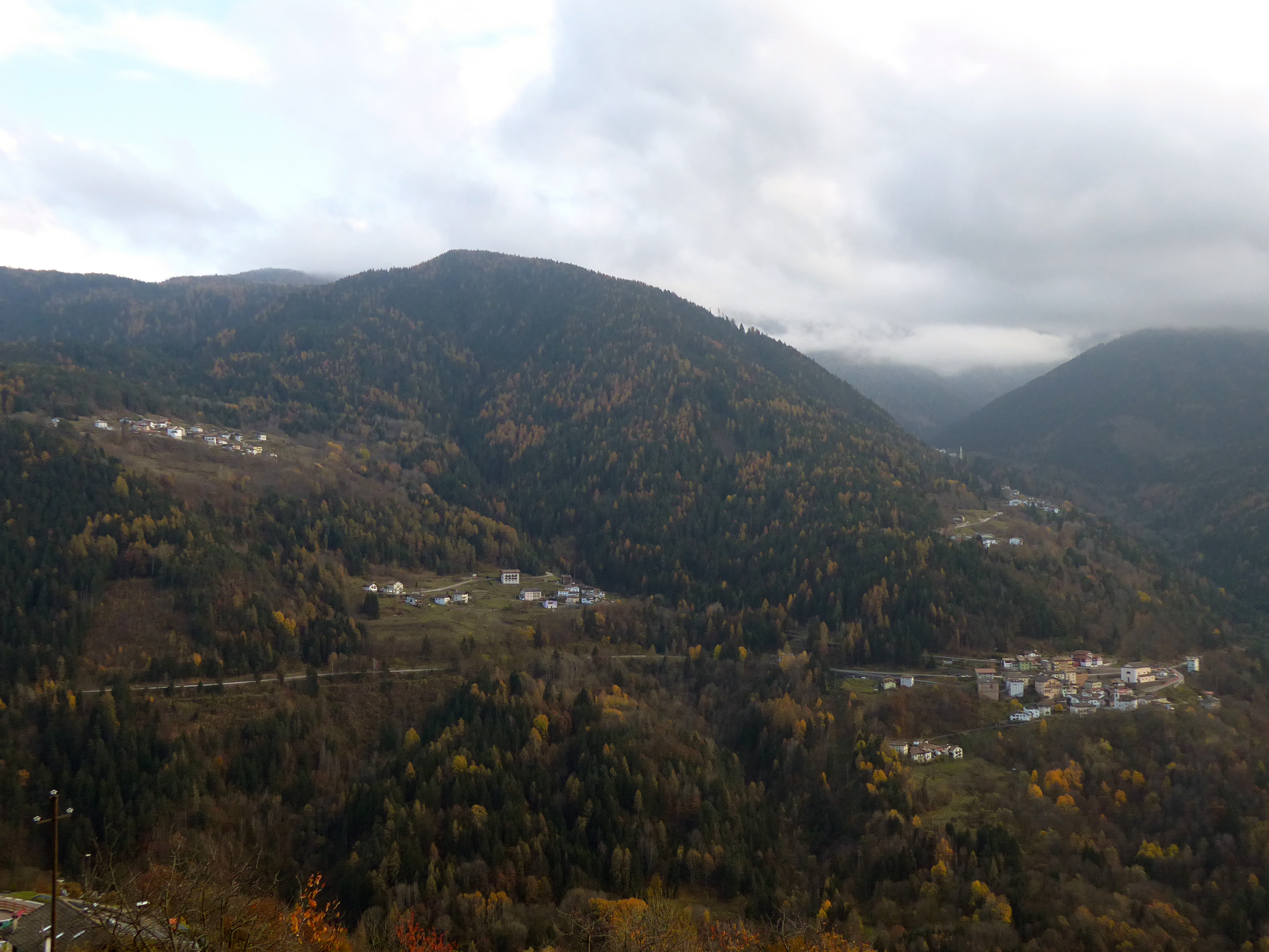

- Location within Italy Location within Trentino-Alto Adige/Südtirol
- Coordinates: 46°15′N 11°21′E
- Country: Italy
- Region: Trentino-Alto Adige/Südtirol
- Province: Trentino (TN)

Government
  - Mayor: Michele Tonini

Area
  - Total: 39.4 km^{2} (15.2 sq mi)

Population (Dec. 2004)
  - Total: 538
  - Density: 13.7/km^{2} (35.4/sq mi)
- Time zone: UTC+1 (CET)
  - Summer (DST): UTC+2 (CEST)
- Postal code: 38040
- Dialing code: 0462
- Website: Official website

Valfloriana is a comune (municipality) in Trentino in the northern Italian region Trentino-Alto Adige/Südtirol, located about 25 kilometres (16 mi) northeast of Trento. As of 31 December 2004, it had a population of 538 and an area of 39.4 square kilometres (15.2 mi^{2}).

Valfloriana borders the following municipalities: Capriana, Altrei, Castello-Molina di Fiemme, Sover, Lona-Lases, Telve and Baselga di Pinè.

In the 1946 Italian institutional referendum, Valforiana was the comune with the strongest result for republic - 573 (97.12%) for republic and 17 (2.88%) for monarchy.

== Demographic evolution ==
Historical population

Year	Pop.	±%
1861	?	—
1871	?	—
1881	?	—
1901	?	—
1911	?	—

Year	Pop.	±%
1921	1,390	—
1931	1,155	−16.9%
1936	1,052	−8.9%
1951	1,028	−2.3%
1961	1,000	−2.7%

Year	Pop.	±%
1971	819	−18.1%
1981	669	−18.3%
1991	582	−13.0%
2001	567	−2.6%

Source: Data from ISTAT
