= Capriana =

- Comune
- Comune di Capriana
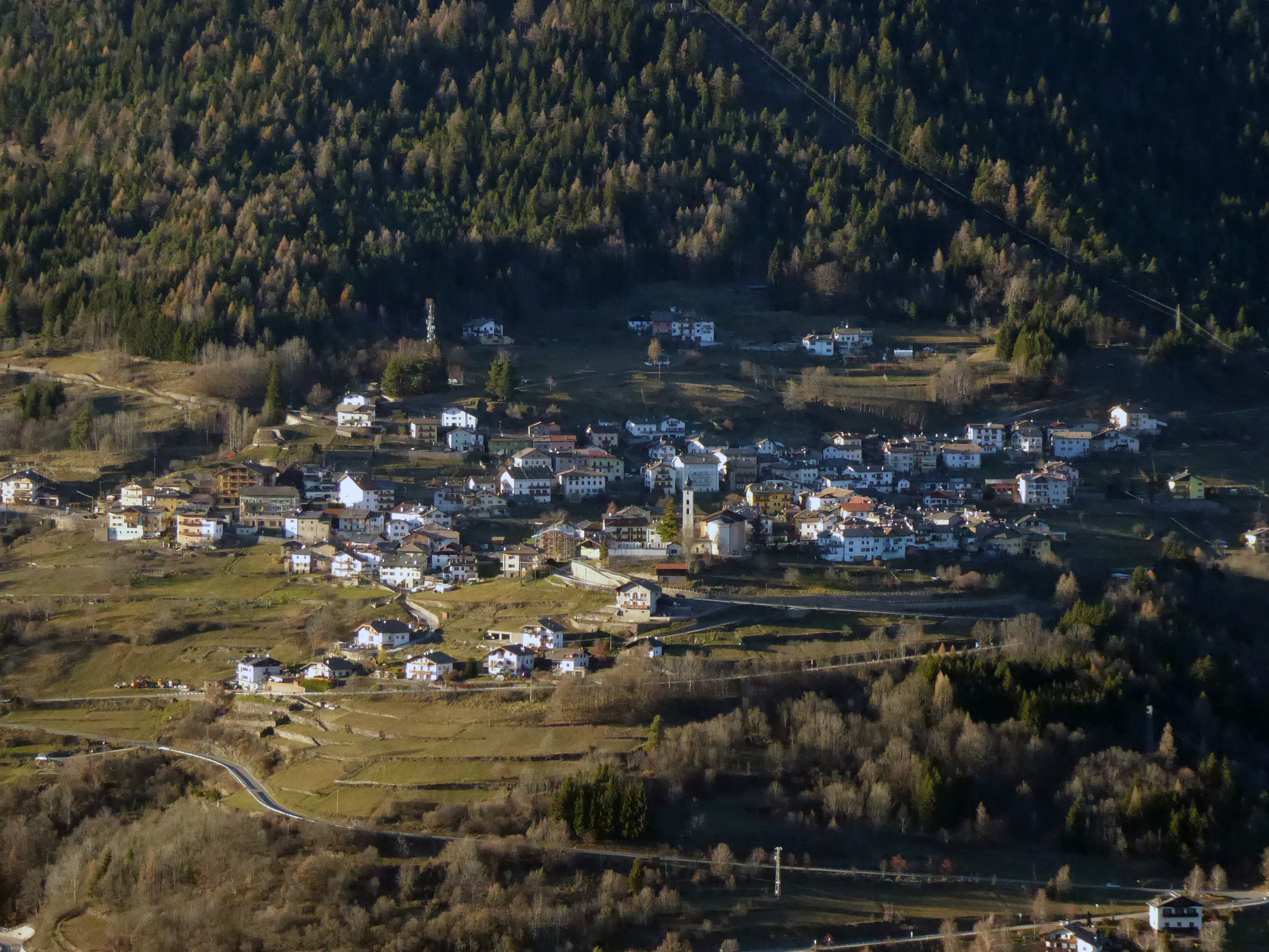

- Location within Italy Location within Trentino-Alto Adige/Südtirol
- Coordinates: 46°16′N 11°20′E
- Country: Italy
- Region: Trentino-Alto Adige/Südtirol
- Province: Trentino (TN)
- Frazioni: Carbonare, Maso Bait, Maso Doss and Maso Lio

Government
  - Mayor: Erwin Dallio

Area
  - Total: 13.0 km^{2} (5.0 sq mi)
- Elevation: 1,007 m (3,304 ft)

Population (2026)
  - Total: 598
  - Density: 46.0/km^{2} (119/sq mi)
- Demonym: Caprianesi or Caorianeri
- Time zone: UTC+1 (CET)
  - Summer (DST): UTC+2 (CEST)
- Postal code: 38030
- Dialing code: 0462
- Patron saint: St. Bartholomew
- Saint day: August 24
- Website: Official website

Capriana (Caoriana in local dialect) is a comune (municipality) in Trentino in the northern Italian region Trentino-Alto Adige/Südtirol, located about 30 kilometres (19 mi) northeast of Trento.

Capriana borders the following municipalities: Montan, Truden, Altrei, Salorno, Valfloriana, Altavalle, and Sover.

Capriana is the birthplace of the mystic and Servant of God Maria Domenica Lazzeri.
