= Castello-Molina di Fiemme =

- Comune
- Comune di Castello-Molina di Fiemme
- Location within Italy Location within Trentino-Alto Adige/Südtirol
- Coordinates: 46°17′N 11°26′E
- Country: Italy
- Region: Trentino-Alto Adige/Südtirol
- Province: Trentino (TN)
- Frazioni: Predaia and Stramentizzo

Government
  - Mayor: Marco Larger

Area
  - Total: 54.5 km^{2} (21.0 sq mi)
- Elevation: 900 m (3,000 ft)

Population (2026)
  - Total: 2,327
  - Density: 42.7/km^{2} (111/sq mi)
- Time zone: UTC+1 (CET)
  - Summer (DST): UTC+2 (CEST)
- Postal code: 38030
- Dialing code: 0462
- Website: Official website

Castello-Molina di Fiemme (Castèl e Molina in local dialect) is a comune (municipality) in Trentino in the northern Italian region Trentino-Alto Adige/Südtirol, located about 35 km (22 mi) northeast of Trento. As of 31 December 2004, it had a population of 2,172 and an area of 54.5 km^{2} (21 sq mi).

The municipality of Castello-Molina di Fiemme contains the frazioni (subdivisions, mainly villages and hamlets) Predaia and Stramentizzo.

Castello-Molina di Fiemme borders the following municipalities: Carano, Cavalese, Altrei, Valfloriana, Pieve Tesino and Telve.

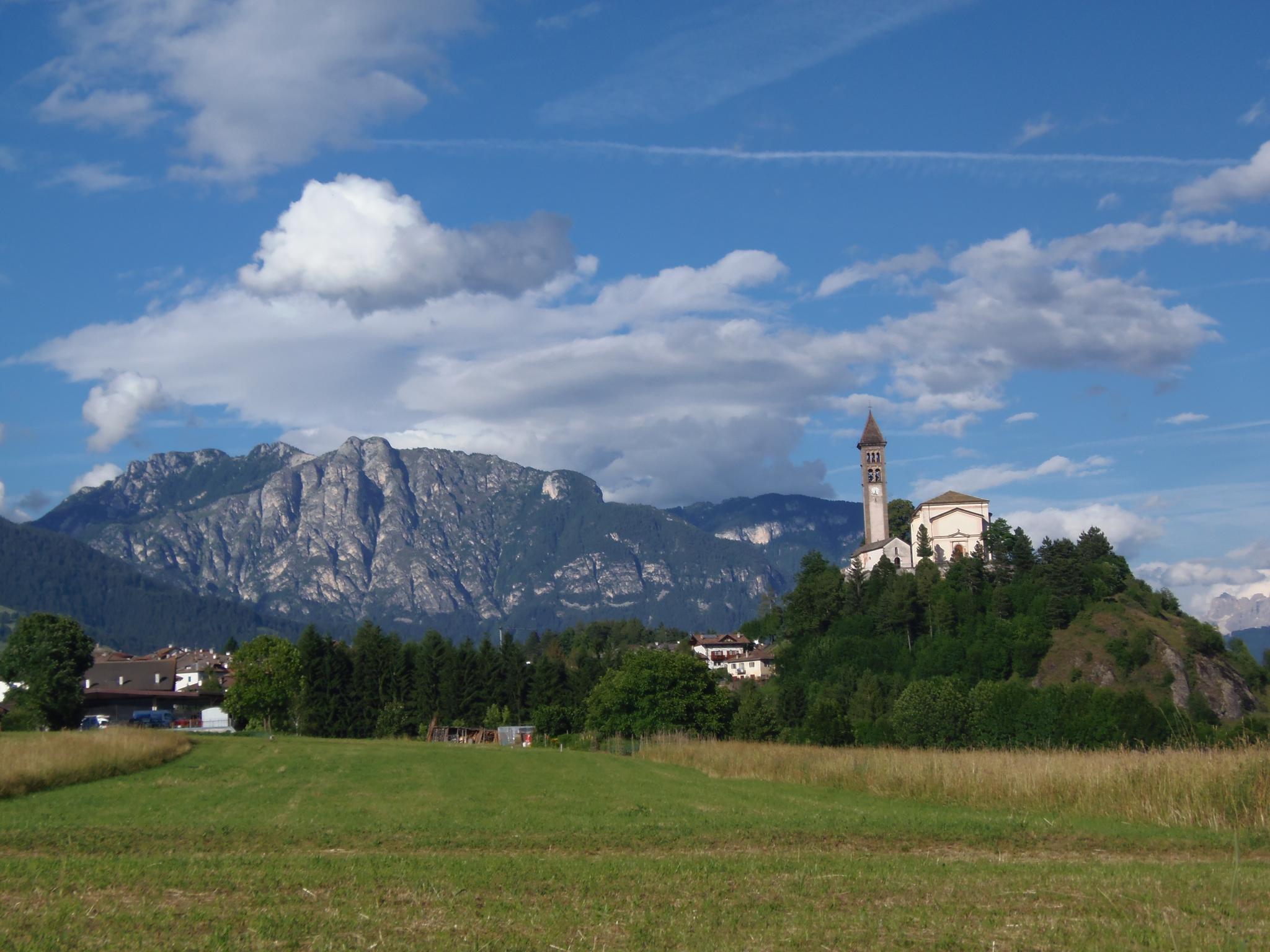
the church

== Demographic evolution ==
Historical population

Year	Pop.	±%
1861	?	—
1871	?	—
1881	?	—
1901	?	—
1911	?	—

Year	Pop.	±%
1921	2,181	—
1931	1,935	−11.3%
1936	1,614	−16.6%
1951	1,818	+12.6%
1961	1,965	+8.1%

Year	Pop.	±%
1971	1,907	−3.0%
1981	2,042	+7.1%
1991	1,971	−3.5%
2001	2,064	+4.7%

Source: Data from ISTAT

== See also ==
- Lake delle Buse
