= Avisio =

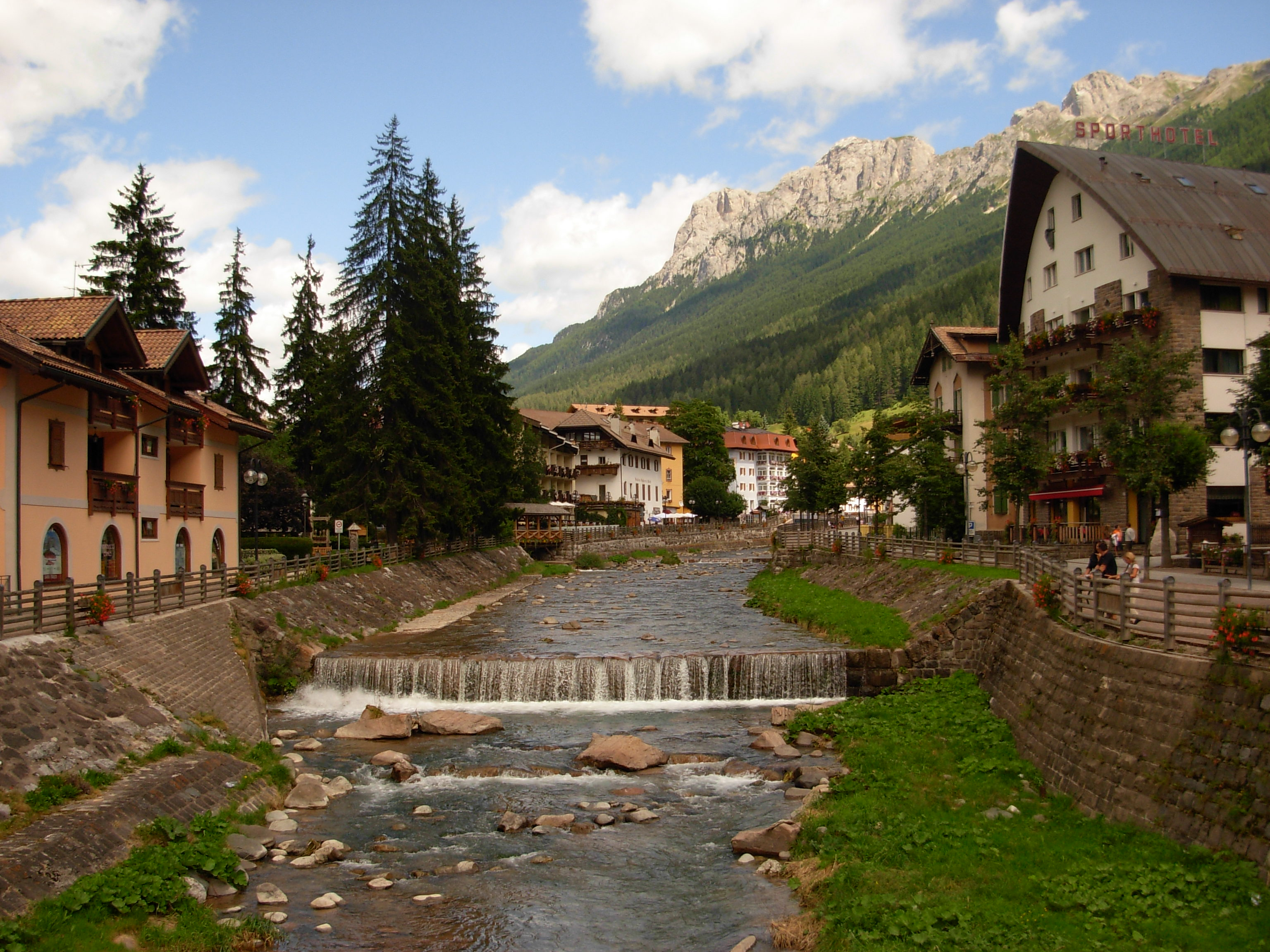
- The Avisio river in Moena, in northern Italy

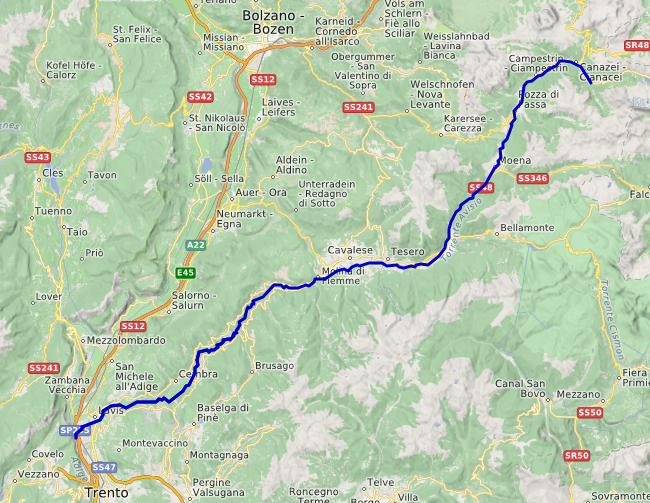
- The course of the Avisio

Location
- Country: Italy

Physical characteristics
- Source
  - location: Marmolada
  - elevation: 2,057 m (6,749 ft)
- Mouth: Adige
  - coordinates: 46.1237°N 11.0826°E
- Length: 89.4 km (55.6 mi)
- Basin size: 936.57 square kilometres (361.61 mi^{2})
- Discharge
  - average: 23.5 cubic metres per second (830 cu ft/s)

Basin features
- Progression: Adige→ Adriatic Sea

The Avisio is an 89.4-kilometre-long (55.6 mi) Italian stream (a torrente), a left tributary of the Adige, whose course is in Trentino.

It rises from Marmolada and runs through the Fascia Valley, the Fiemme Valley and the Cembra Valley before joining the Adige in the town of Lavis, a small town 8 kilometres (5 mi) north of Trento.

== Etymology of Avisio ==
The name "Avisio" is documented around 1050 AD as supra fluvium qui vocatur Auis, and in 1200 AD as ponte Avisi. It is most likely derived from the Gallic word abisjo, meaning "watercourse," which itself originates from the Proto-Indo-European root abì, meaning "water".

== Course of the Avisio River ==
The Avisio River originates from the Marmolada, flowing through the Val di Fassa, Val di Fiemme, and Val di Cembra valleys.
