= Trudner Horn Nature Park =

Nature reserve in South Tyrol, Italy

Coordinates: 46.3°N 11.29°E

Naturpark Trudner Horn
- Interactive map of Naturpark Trudner Horn
- Location: South Tyrol, Italy
- Nearest city: Bolzano
- Area: 6,866 ha (16,966 acres)
- Website: www.provinz.bz.it/natur/2803/index_e.asp

The Trudner Horn Nature Park (Italian: Parco naturale Monte Corno) is a nature reserve south of Bolzano in South Tyrol, Italy.

== Flora ==
The Trudner Horn Nature Park is home to many variety of rare plant, like are species of pasque flower Pulsatilla, Primula, Leucojum vernum, Aquilegia einseleana, Achillea oxyloba, Artemisia mutellina, Lilium martagon and Lilium bulbiferum, species of Orchidaceae (for example Cypripedium calceolus), Cyclamen purpurascens, Dictamnus albus, Dianthus carthusianorum, Armeria alpina, species of Gentiana, Iris pseudacorus, edelweiss Leontopodium alpinum, Ruscus aculeatus, alpine forget-me-not Eritrichium nanum, European white waterlily Nymphaea alba, Typha, spatterdock Nuphar lutea, Physoplexis comosa. In acidic bogs are growing Drosera and Pinguicula.
