= Altavalle =

- Comune
- Comune di Altavalle
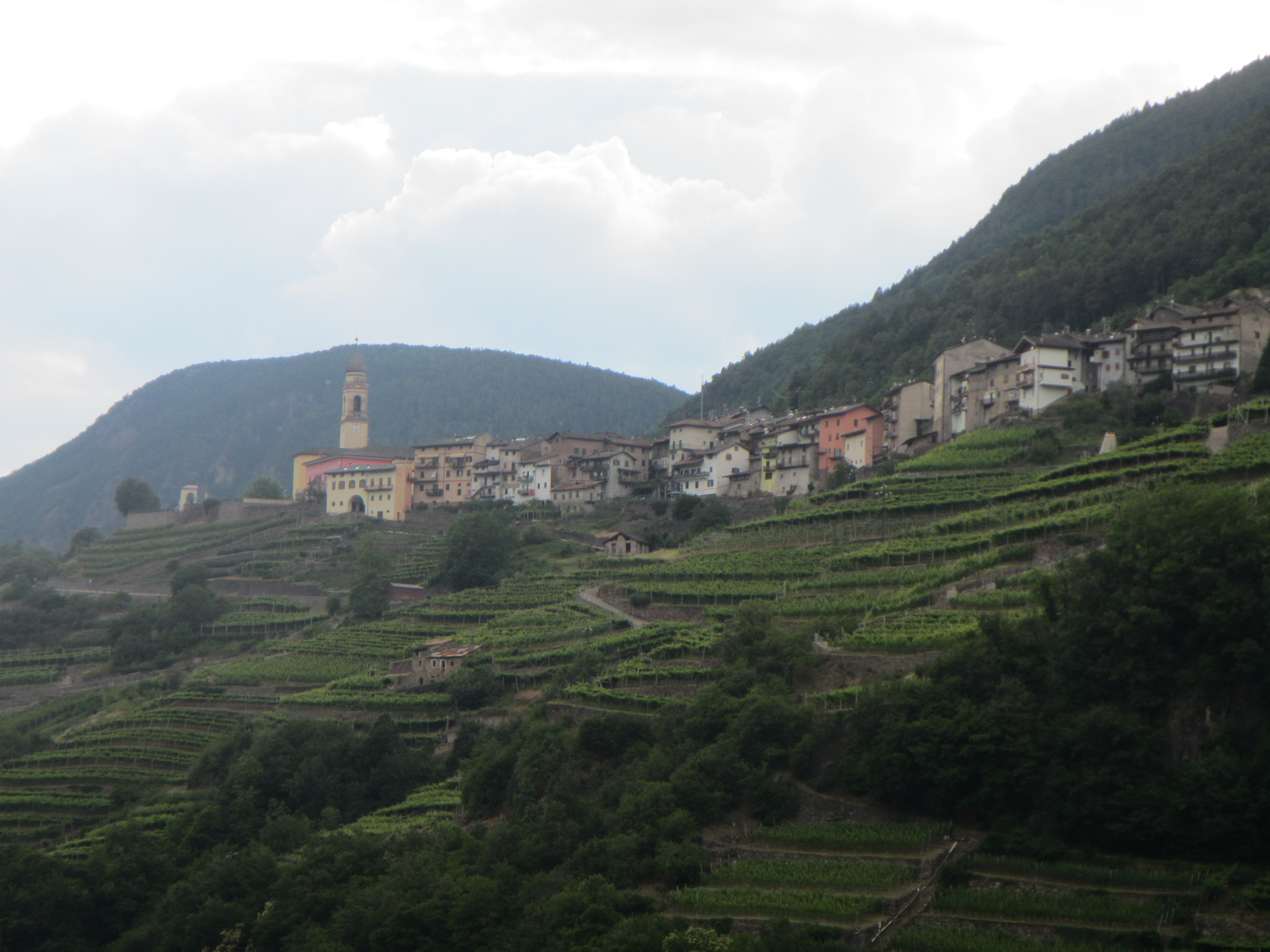
- View of Faver.

- Location of Altavalle in Italy Altavalle (Trentino-Alto Adige/Südtirol)
- Coordinates: 46°11′N 11°14′E
- Country: Italy
- Region: Trentino-Alto Adige/Südtirol
- Province: Trentino (TN)
- Frazioni: Faver (communal seat), Grauno, Grumes, Valda

Government
  - Mayor: Matteo Paolazzi

Area
  - Total: 33.56 km^{2} (12.96 sq mi)
- Elevation: 672 m (2,205 ft)

Population (2026)
  - Total: 1,645
  - Density: 49.02/km^{2} (127.0/sq mi)
- Time zone: UTC+1 (CET)
  - Summer (DST): UTC+2 (CEST)
- Postal code: 38085
- Dialing code: 0465
- Website: Official website

Altavalle is a comune (municipality) in Trentino in the northern Italian region Trentino-Alto Adige/Südtirol. It was formed on 1 January 2016 as the merger of the previous communes of Faver, Grauno, Grumes and Valda.

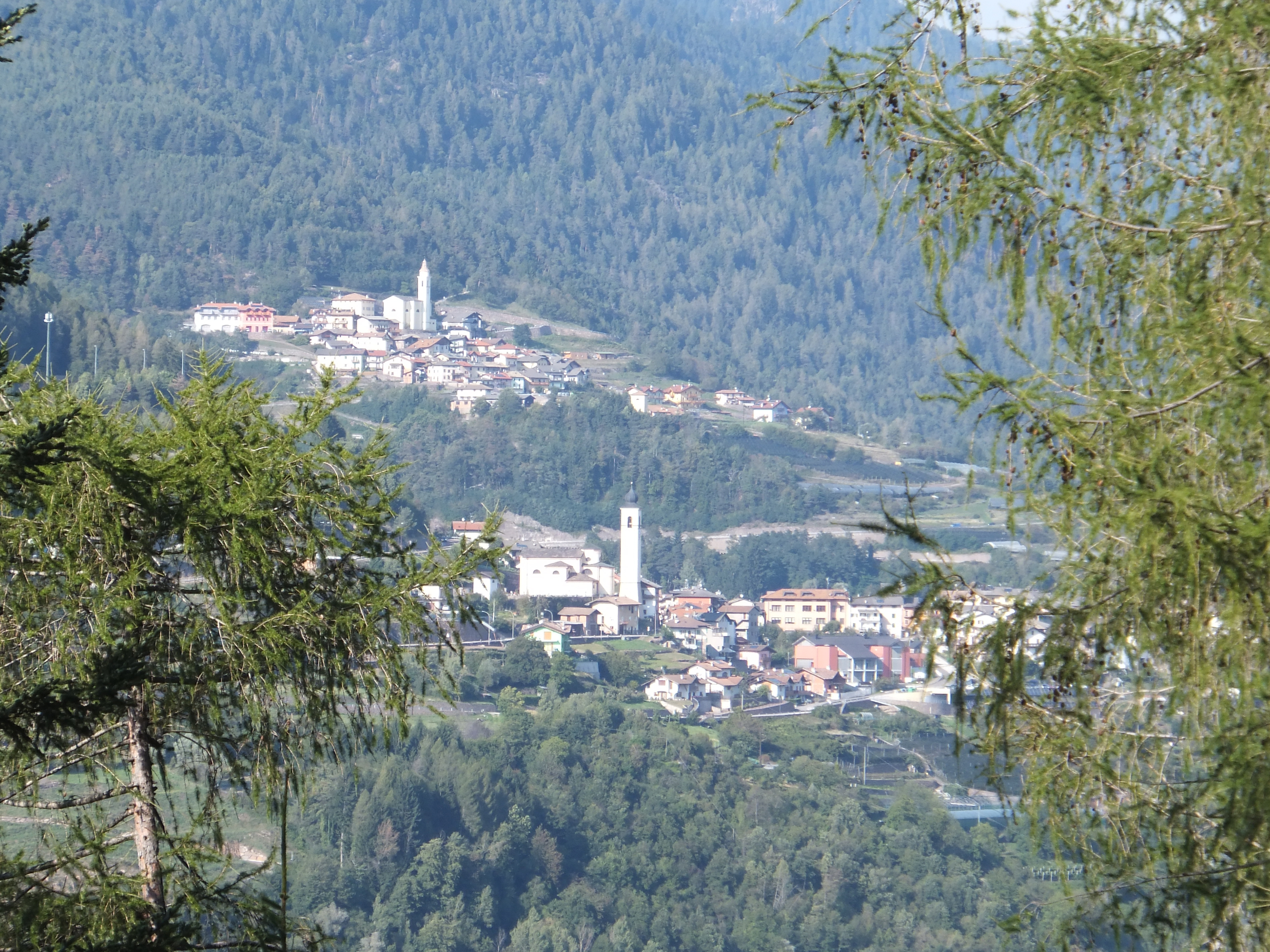
The fractions of Grauno (above) and Grumes (below)
