= Segonzano =

- Comune
- Comune di Segonzano
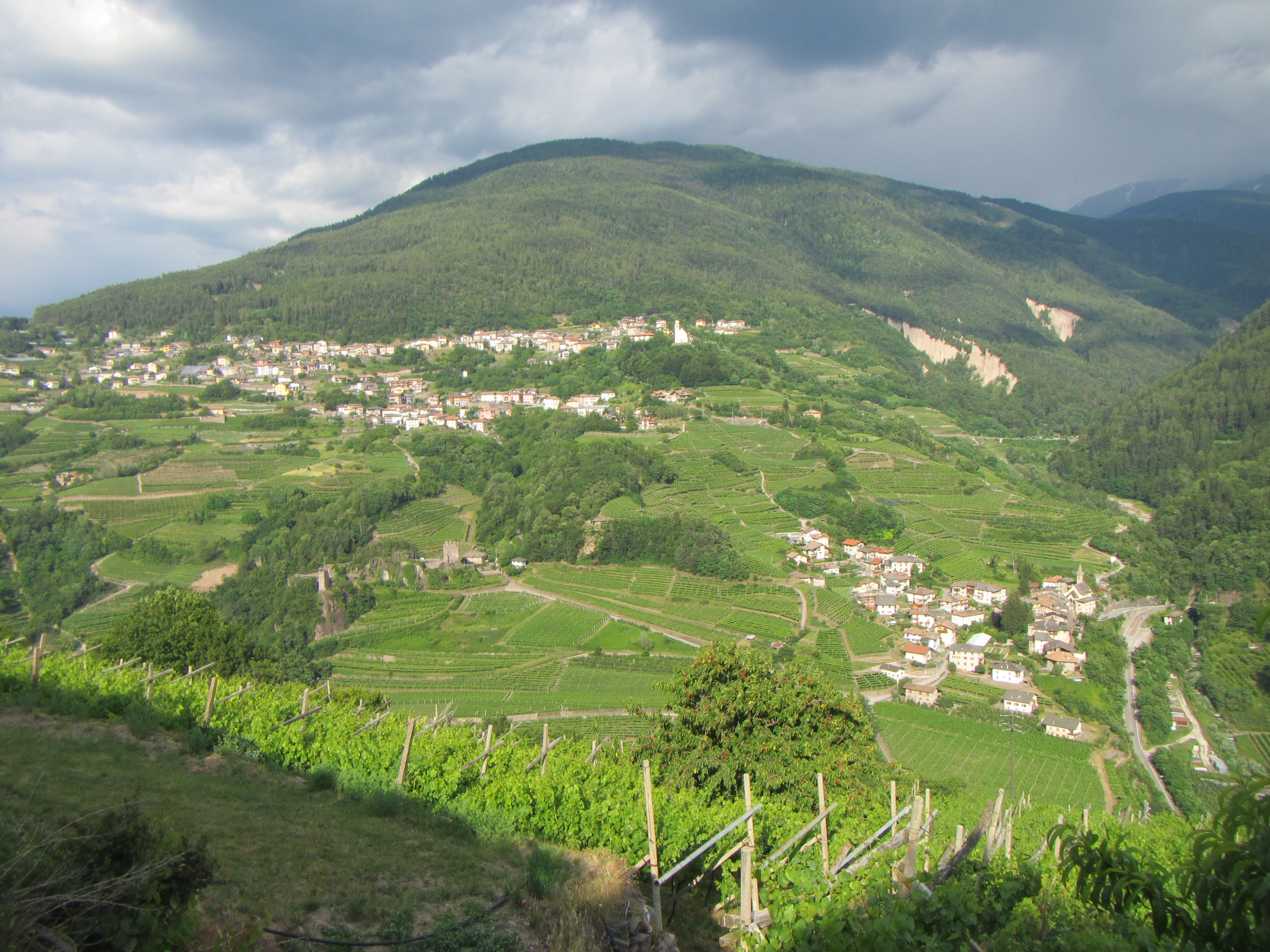
- View from the nearby Faver

- Location within Italy Location within Trentino-Alto Adige/Südtirol
- Coordinates: 46°11′N 11°16′E
- Country: Italy
- Region: Trentino-Alto Adige/Südtirol
- Province: Trentino (TN)

Government
  - Mayor: Grazia Benedetti

Area
  - Total: 20.72 km^{2} (8.00 sq mi)
- Elevation: 700 m (2,300 ft)

Population (31 October 2021)
  - Total: 1,384
  - Density: 66.80/km^{2} (173.0/sq mi)
- Demonym
- Time zone: UTC+1 (CET)
  - Summer (DST): UTC+2 (CEST)
- Postal code: 38047
- Dialing code: 0461
- Website: Official website

Segonzano (Segonzàn in local dialect) is a comune (municipality) in Trentino in the northern Italian region Trentino-Alto Adige/Südtirol, located about 15 kilometres (9 mi) northeast of Trento.

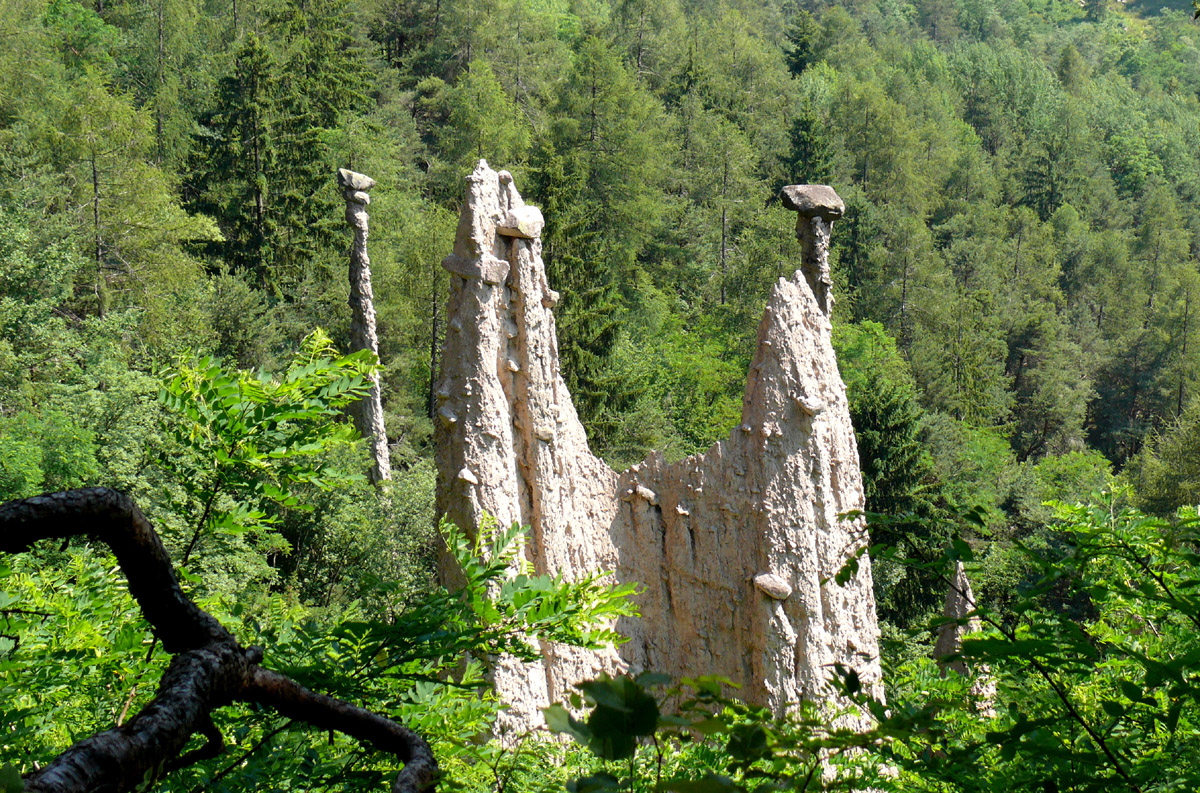
the pyramids of Segonzano

== Main sights ==
- Castle, only partially preserved. It was damaged during a local battle between French and Austrian troops in 1796.
- Sanctuary of Madonna dell'Aiuto
- The "Piramidi di Terra", natural pyramids created by erosion.
