= Faver (Altavalle) =

Coordinates: 46°10′53″N 11°14′16″E

- Frazione
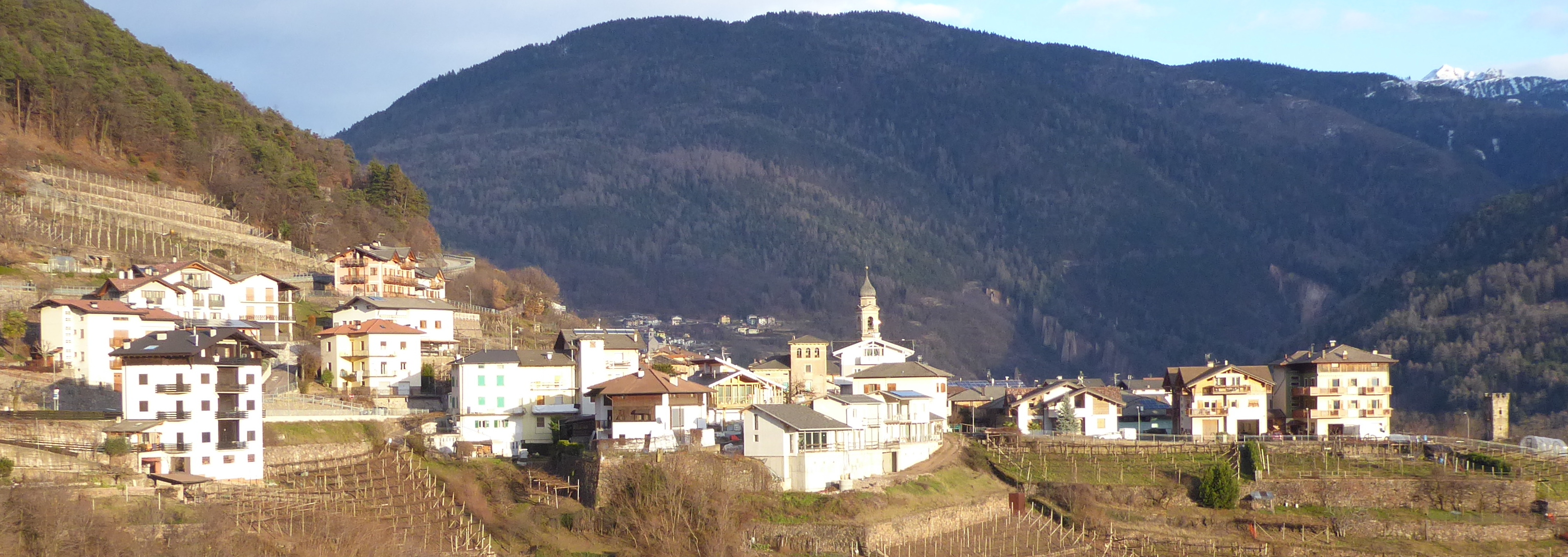
- Interactive map of Faver
- Country: Italy
- Region: Trentino-Alto Adige/Südtirol
- Province: Trentino
- Municipality: Altavalle
- Time zone: UTC+1 (CET)
  - Summer (DST): UTC+2 (CEST)

Faver (German: Fafer) is a frazione of the comune of Altavalle in Trentino in the northern Italian region Trentino-Alto Adige/Südtirol, located about 15 kilometres (9 mi) northeast of Trento.
