= Grumes =

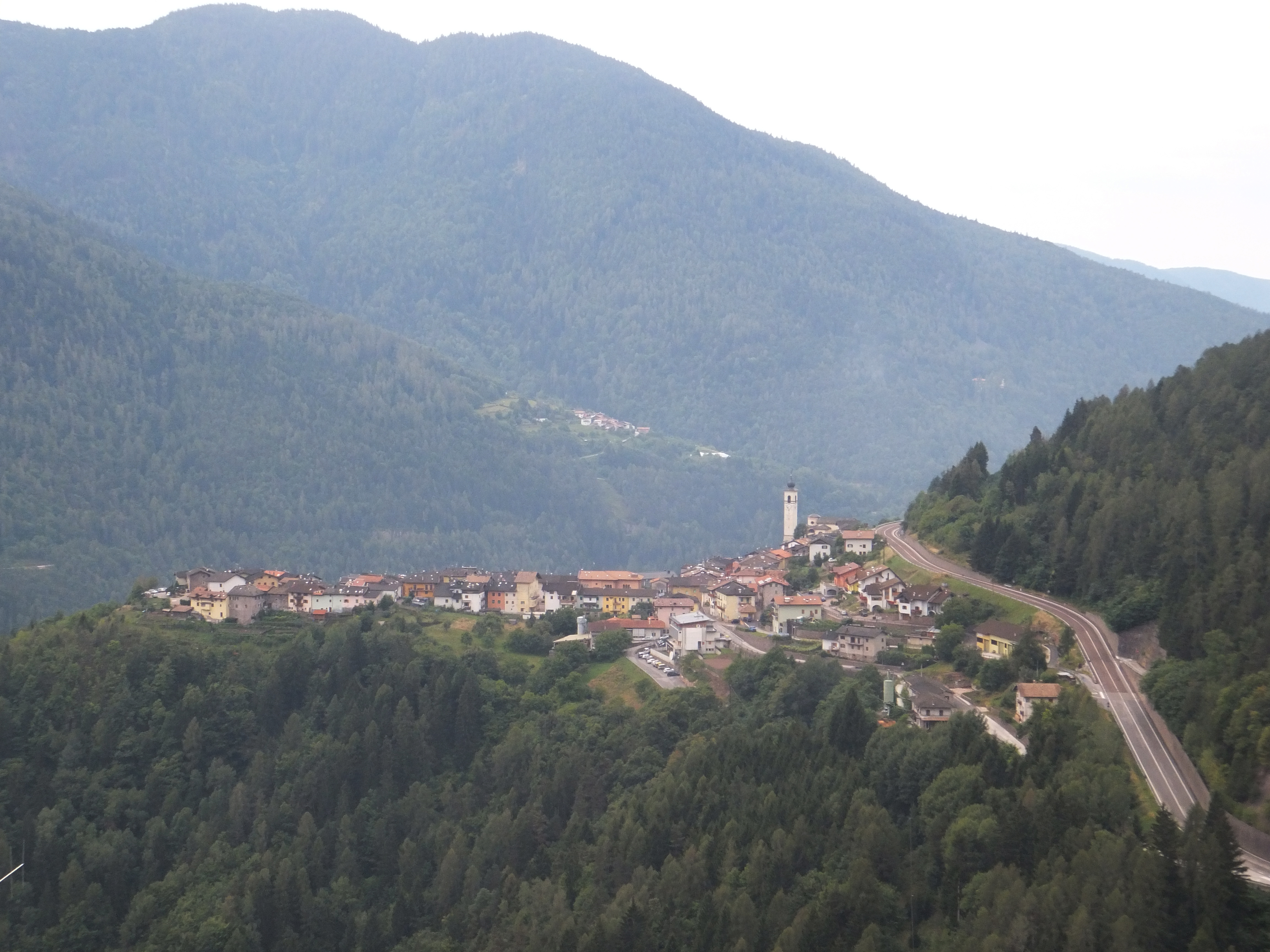
- Grumes visto da Grauno

- Location within Italy
- Coordinates: 46°13′N 11°18′E
- Country: Italy
- Time zone: UTC+1 (CET)
  - Summer (DST): UTC+2 (CEST)

Grumes (German: Grumeis) is a frazione of the comune of Altavalle in Trentino in the northern Italian region Trentino-Alto Adige/Südtirol, located about 20 kilometres (12 mi) northeast of Trento.

Grumes is a member of Cittaslow.
