= Cima Canali =

Mountain in Italy

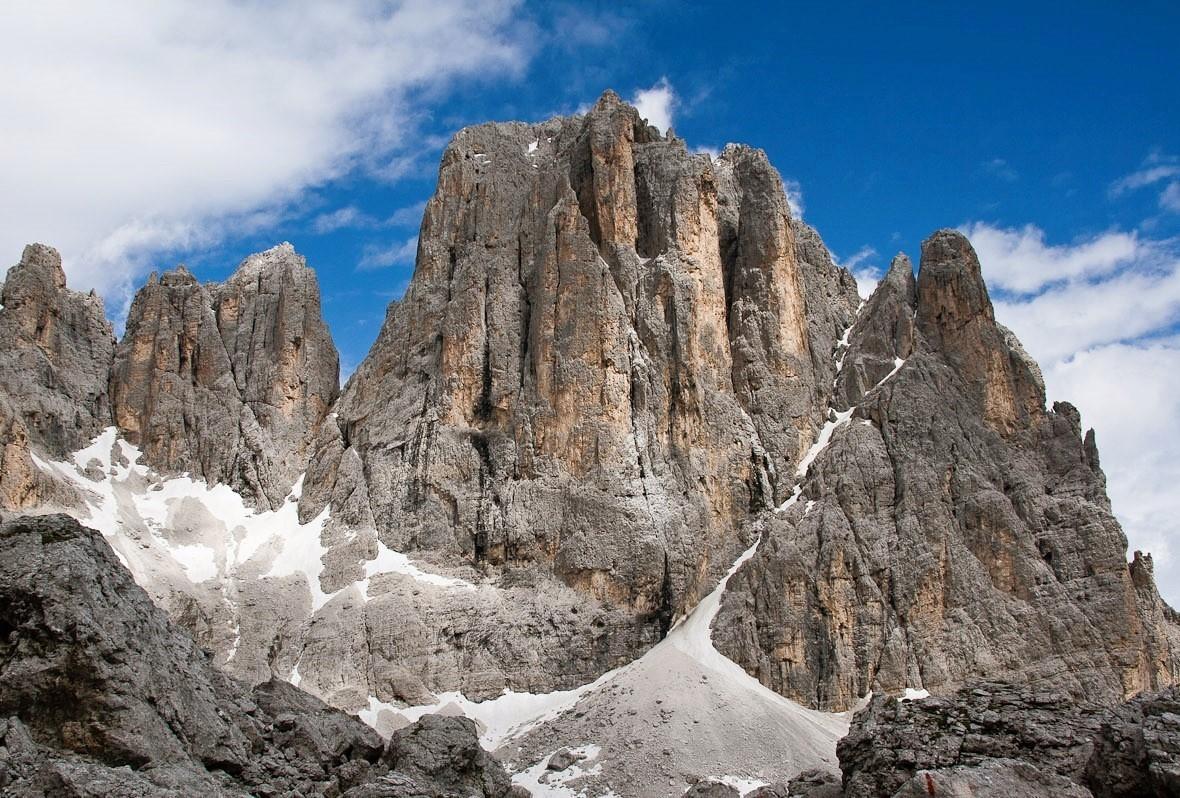
- West face

Highest point
- Elevation: 2,900 m (9,514 ft)
- Prominence: 248 m (814 ft)
- Parent peak: Pala di San Martino
- Isolation: 1.097 km (0.682 mi)
- Coordinates: 46°14′38″N 11°51′50″E

Geography
- Location within Italy
- Country: Italy
- Region: Trentino-Alto Adige/Südtirol
- Protected area: Paneveggio-Pale di San Martino Natural Park
- Parent range: Dolomites; Pale di San Martino
- Topo map: Tabacco Maps Pale di San Martino

Geology
- Rock age: Triassic
- Rock type: Dolomite

Climbing
- First ascent: 1879

Cima Canali is a mountain in Trentino-Alto Adige/Südtirol of northern Italy.

== Description ==
Cima Canali is a 2,900-meter-elevation (9,514-foot) summit in the Pale di San Martino group of the Dolomites. The peak is located seven kilometers (4.35 miles) north of Primiero San Martino di Castrozza and within Paneveggio-Pale di San Martino Natural Park, a UNESCO World Heritage Site. Precipitation runoff from the mountain's slopes drains into tributaries of the Cismon. Topographic relief is significant as the summit rises 1300 meters (4,265 feet) above the Rio Pradidali in one kilometer (0.6 mile), and 640 meters (2,100 feet) above the Rifugio Pradidali in one-half kilometer (0.3 mile). The nearest higher neighbor is Cima di Fradusta, 1.08 kilometers (0.67 mile) to the northeast. The first ascent of the summit was made on August 30, 1879, by Michele Bettega and Charles Comyns Tucker via the west slope and the south ridge. The north wall was first climbed on July 14, 1894, by Wilfred Leslie Waldegrave Brodie and Giuseppe Zecchini.

== Climate ==
Based on the Köppen climate classification, Cima Canali is located in an alpine climate zone with long, cold winters, and short, mild summers. Weather systems are forced upward by the mountains (orographic lift), causing moisture to drop in the form of rain and snow. The months of June through September offer the most favorable weather for climbing or visiting this area.

== Gallery ==
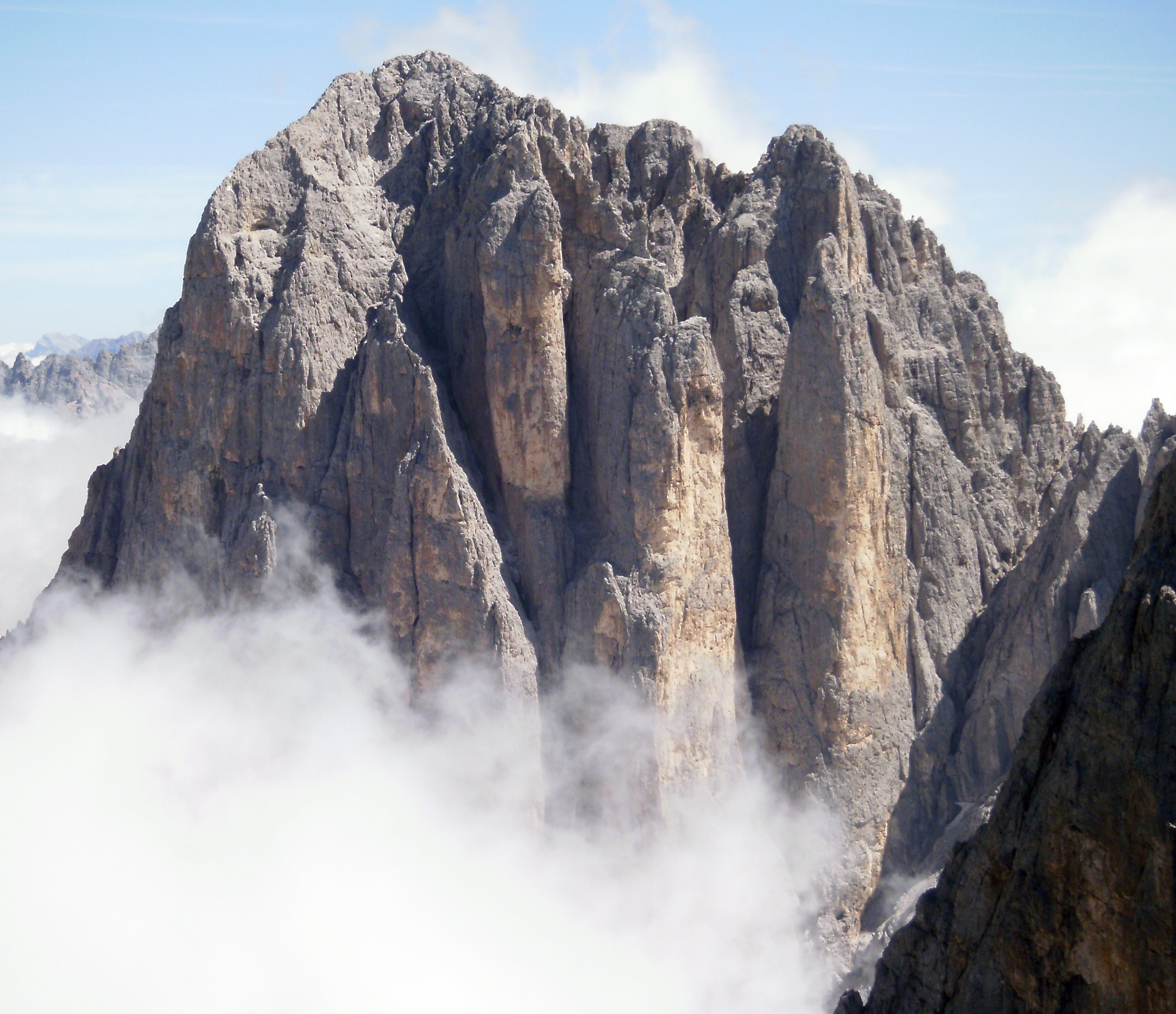
Cima Canali from Cima di Val di Roda

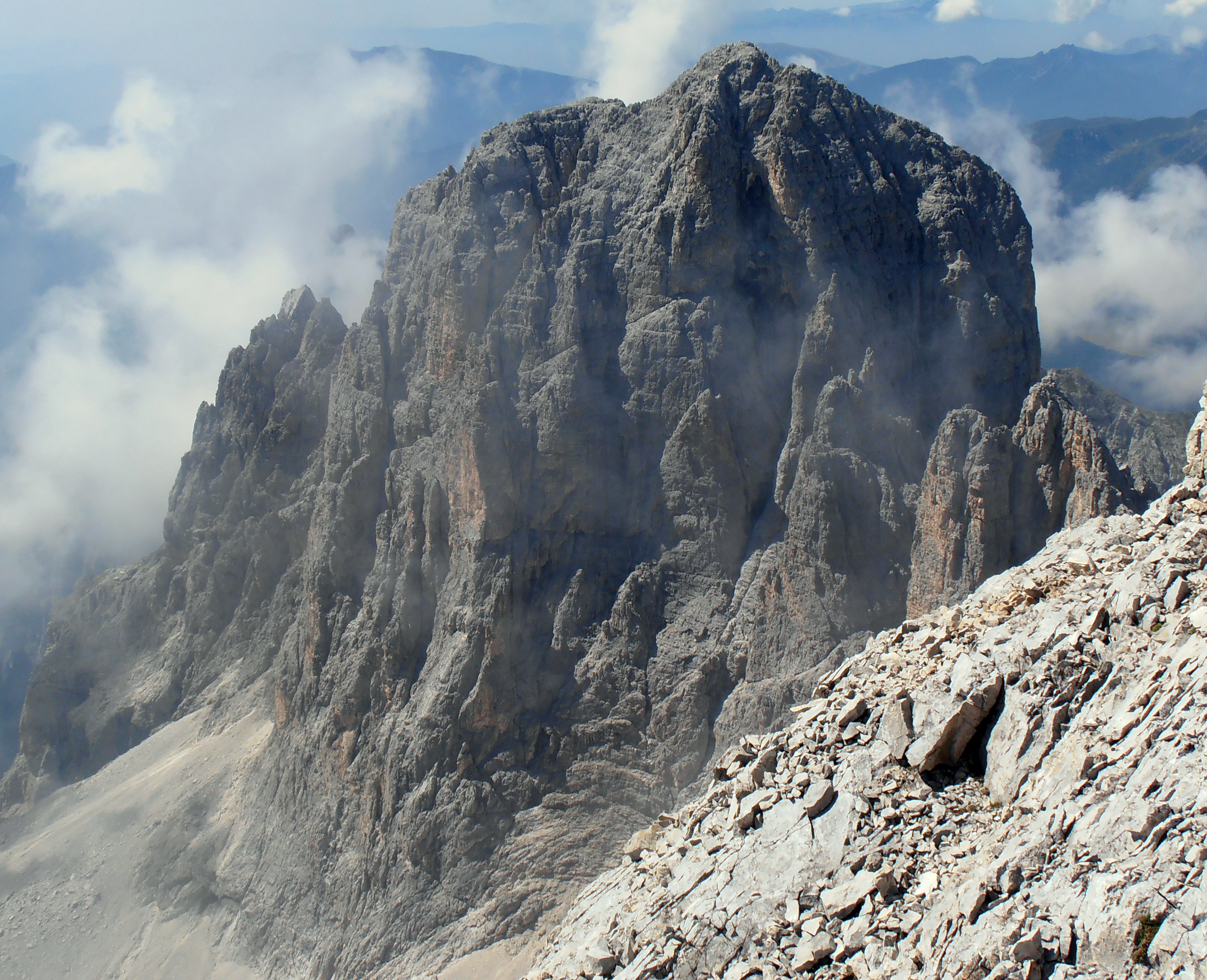
Northeast aspect

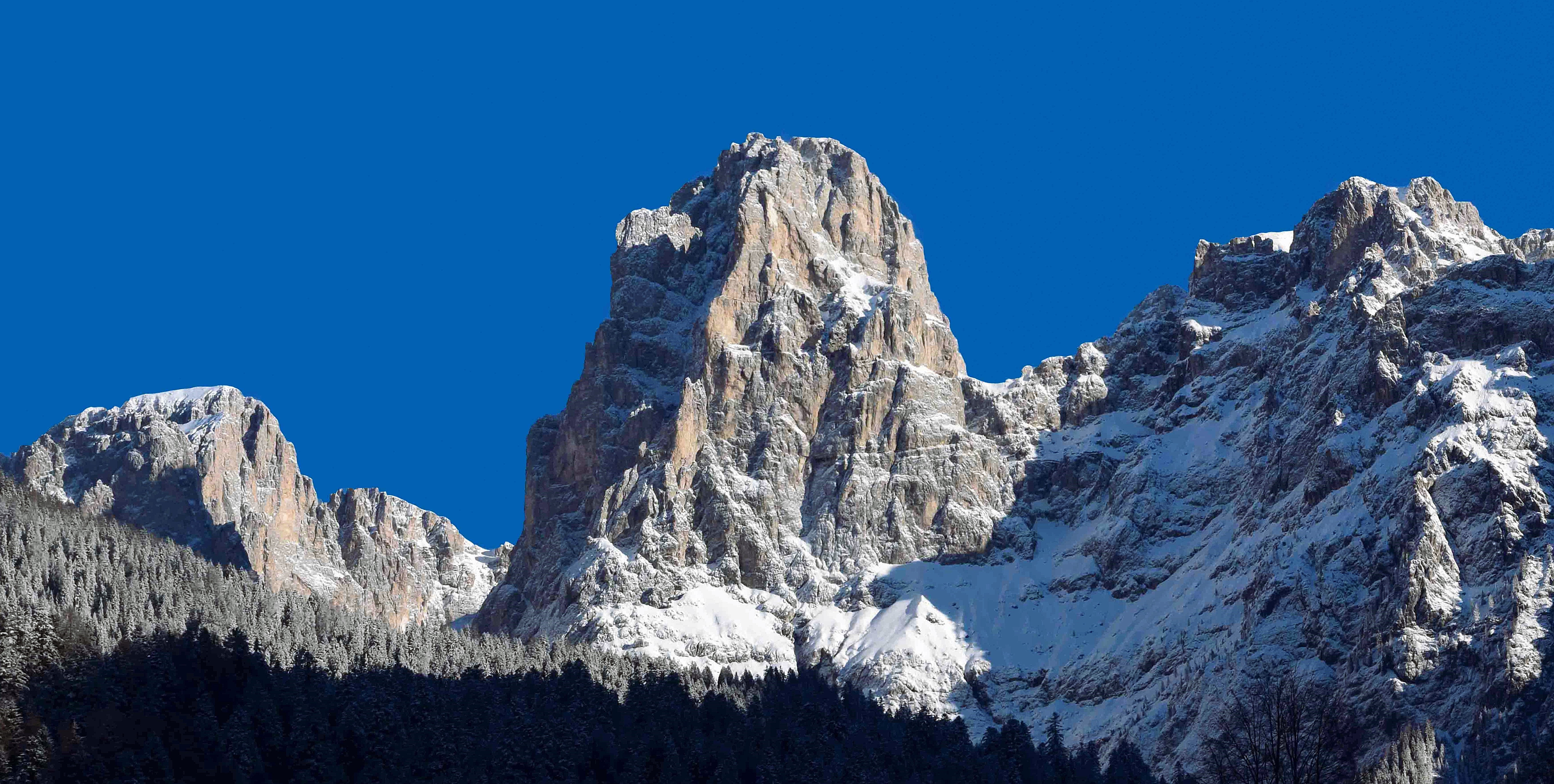
South aspect

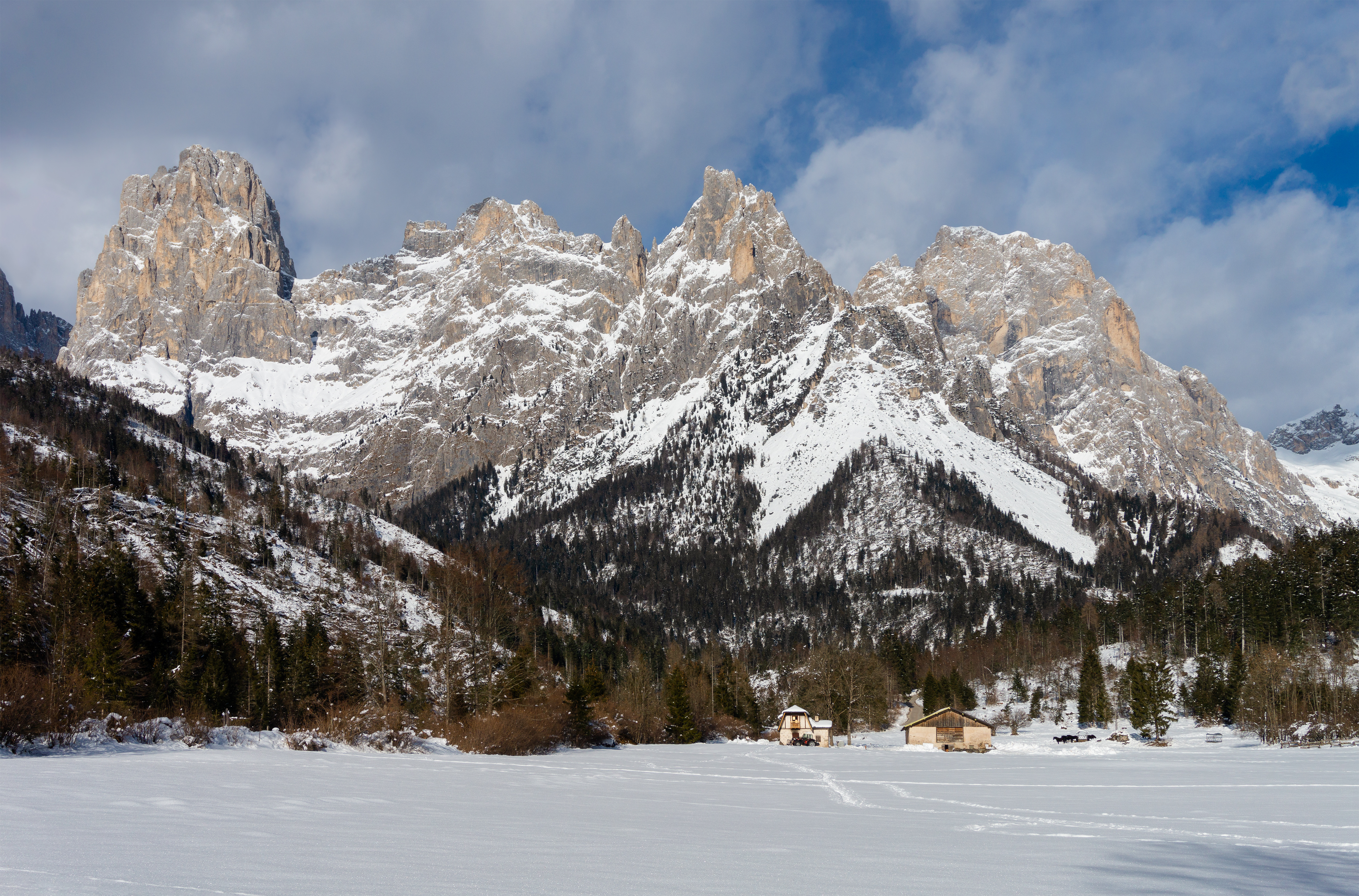
Cima Canali (left) from south

== See also ==
- Southern Limestone Alps
