= Cima Pradidali =

Mountain in Italy

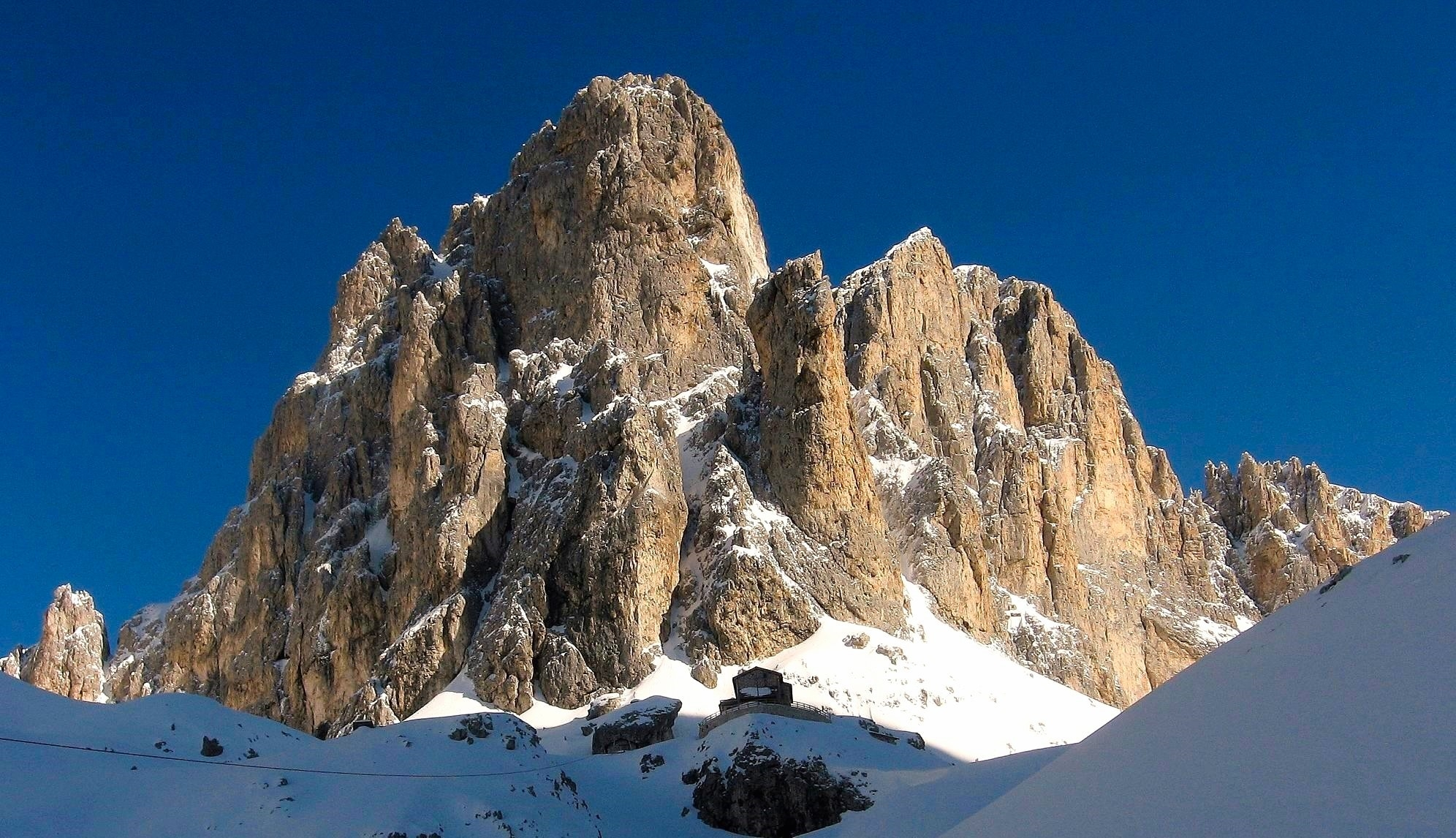
- Southeast aspect

Highest point
- Elevation: 2,774 m (9,101 ft)
- Prominence: 122 m (400 ft)
- Parent peak: Pala di San Martino
- Isolation: 0.39 km (0.24 mi)
- Coordinates: 46°14′54″N 11°51′02″E

Geography
- Location within Italy
- Country: Italy
- Province: Trentino
- Protected area: Paneveggio-Pale di San Martino Natural Park
- Parent range: Dolomites; Pale di San Martino
- Topo map: Tabacco 22 Pale di San Martino

Geology
- Rock age: Triassic
- Rock type: Dolomite

Climbing
- First ascent: September 18, 1881

Cima Pradidali is a mountain in the province of Trentino in northern Italy.

== Description ==
Cima Pradidali is a 2,774-meter-elevation (9,101-foot) summit in the Pale di San Martino group of the Dolomites. Set in the Trentino-Alto Adige/Südtirol region, the peak is located four kilometers (2.5 miles) southeast of San Martino di Castrozza mountain resort, and the peak is within Paneveggio-Pale di San Martino Natural Park, a UNESCO World Heritage Site. Precipitation runoff from the mountain's slopes drains into tributaries of the Cismon. Topographic relief is significant as the summit rises 1,575 meters (5,167 feet) above the Cismon in three kilometers (1.86 miles), and 500 meters (1,640 feet) above the Rifugio Pradidali in 0.5 kilometer (0.3 mile). The nearest higher neighbor is Cima Immink, 0.39 kilometer (0.24 mile) to the north. The Cima Pradidali toponym translates as Yellow Meadows Peak, attributable to yellow alpine poppies growing in the Pradidali Valley below the peak.

== Climbing ==
The first ascent of the summit was made on September 18, 1881, by Michele Bettega and two Englishmen via the northwest slope. The south-southwest face was first climbed on August 12, 1893, by Ludwig Norman-Neruda and his wife May Norman-Neruda. The East Couloir was first climbed on August 25, 1897, by Michele Bettega, John Swinnerton Phillimore, Arthur Guy Sandars Raynor, and Giuseppe Zecchini. The southeast spigolo was climbed on August 7, 1898, by Giacomo Faoro, Siegfried Schönborn, Matteo Tavernaro, and Lieutenant Uhl.

== Climate ==
Based on the Köppen climate classification, Cima Pradidali is located in an alpine climate zone with long, cold winters, and short, mild summers. Weather systems are forced upward by the mountains (orographic lift), causing moisture to drop in the form of rain and snow. The months of June through September offer the most favorable weather for climbing or visiting this area.

== Gallery ==
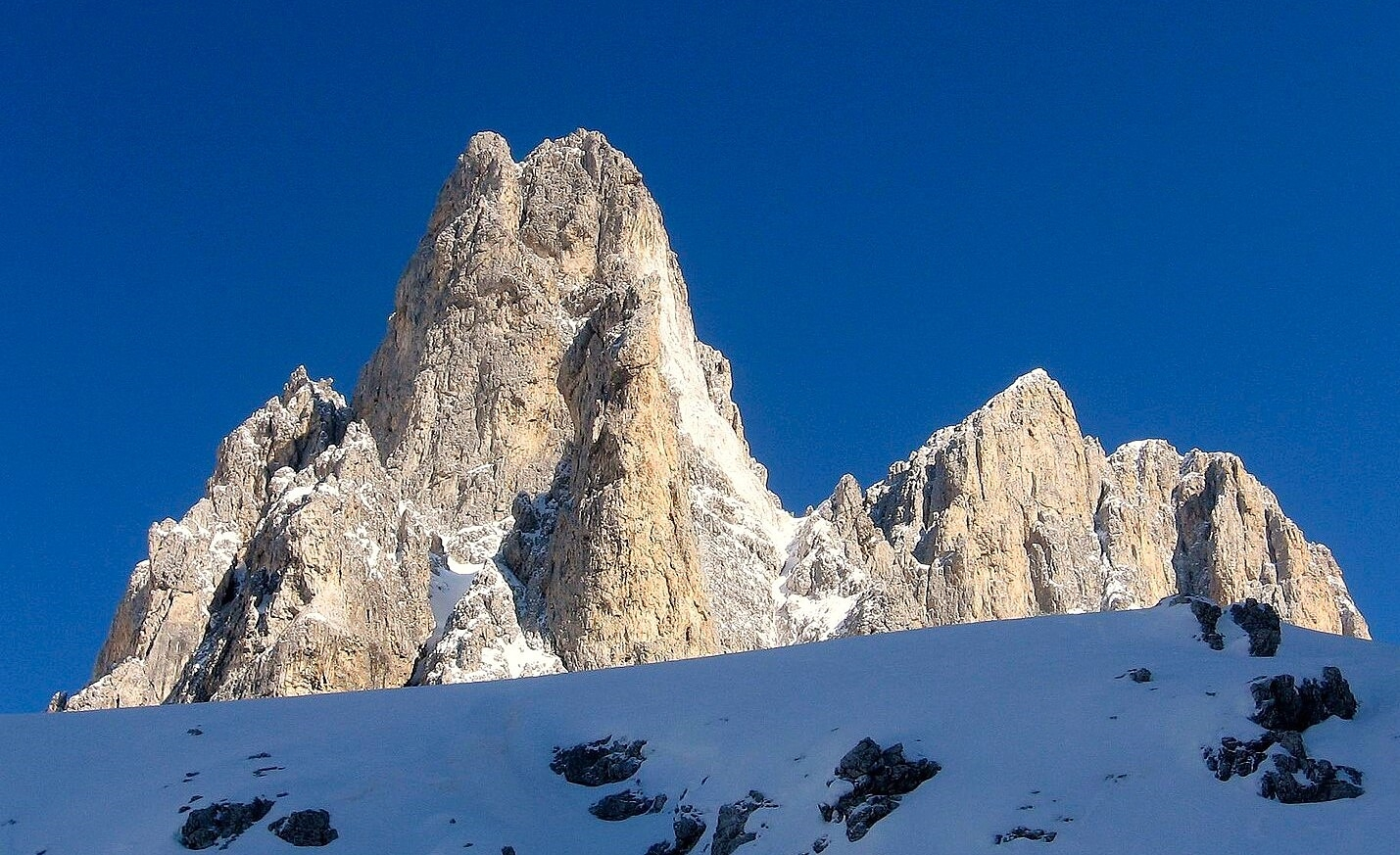
Southeast aspect

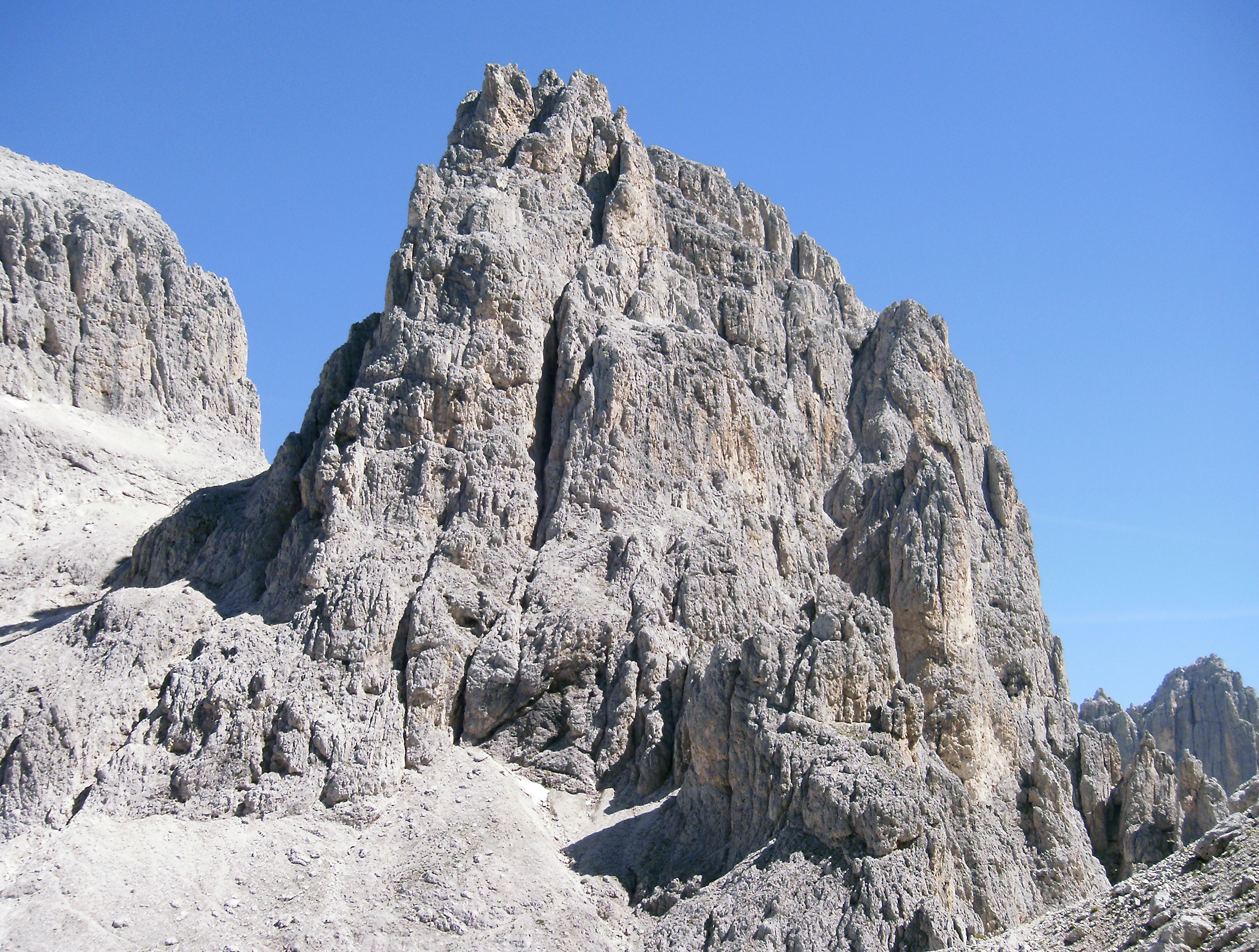
West aspect

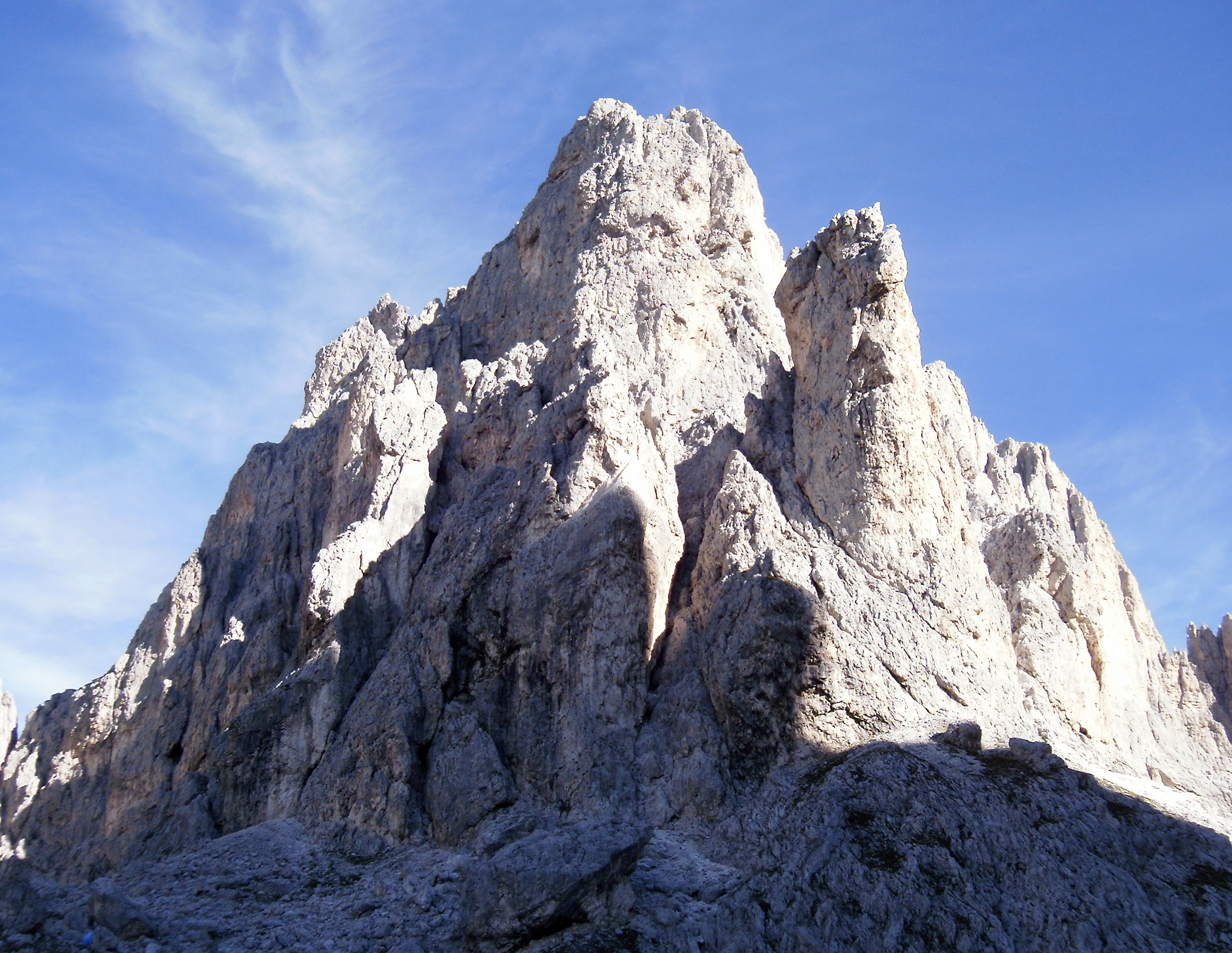
Southeast aspect

== See also ==
- Southern Limestone Alps
