= Sass d'Ortiga =

Mountain in Italy

- Sasso d'Ortiga
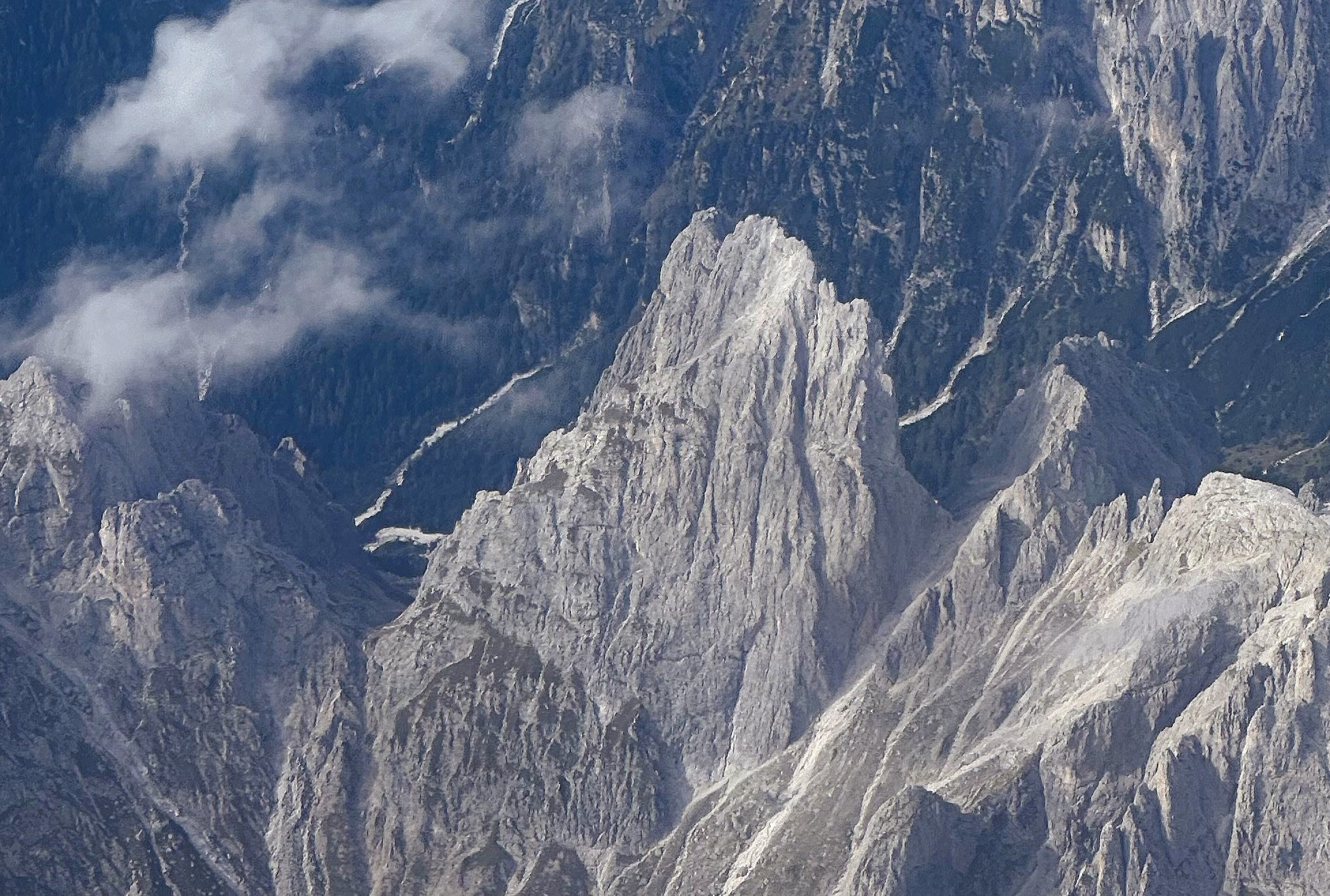
- East aspect, aerial view from airliner

Highest point
- Elevation: 2,649 m (8,691 ft)
- Prominence: 246 m (807 ft)
- Parent peak: Croda Grande
- Isolation: 0.708 km (0.440 mi)
- Coordinates: 46°14′15″N 11°54′56″E

Geography
- Location within Italy
- Country: Italy
- Region: Trentino-Alto Adige/Südtirol / Veneto
- Protected area: Paneveggio-Pale di San Martino Natural Park
- Parent range: Dolomites
- Topo map: Tabacco 22 Pale di San Martino

Geology
- Rock age: Triassic
- Rock type: Dolomite

Climbing
- First ascent: 1892

Sass d'Ortiga is a mountain on the boundary shared by the Trentino-Alto Adige/Südtirol and Veneto regions of northern Italy.

== Description ==
Sass d'Ortiga is a 2,649-meter-elevation (8,691-foot) summit in the Pale di San Martino group of the Dolomites. Set on the common boundary between the provinces of Belluno and Trentino, the peak is located six kilometers (3.7 miles) northeast of Primiero San Martino di Castrozza and within Paneveggio-Pale di San Martino Natural Park, a UNESCO World Heritage Site. Precipitation runoff from the peak's west slope drains into Torrente Canali which is a tributary of the Cismon, whereas the east slope drains to Torrente Mis which is a tributary of the Piave. Topographic relief is significant as the summit rises 1,200 meters (3,937 feet) above the Canali Valley in 1.5 kilometers (0.93 mile), and 950 meters (3,116 feet) along the east slope in one kilometer (0.6 mile). The nearest higher neighbor is Cime Vani Alti, 1.6 kilometers (1 mile) to the northeast. The peak's toponym translates as "Rock of the Nettle."

== Climbing ==
The first ascent of Sass d'Ortiga was made on July 22, 1892, by Demeter Diamantidi, Peter Kotter, and Giuseppe Zecchini via the southeast ridge. The east side was first climbed on June 11, 1897, by Luigi Bernard and Oscar Schuster. The Southwest Face features the elegant Scalet-Bettega rock-climbing route which was first climbed in 1961 by Aldo Bettega and Samuele Scalet.

== Climate ==
Based on the Köppen climate classification, Sass d'Ortiga is located in an alpine climate zone with long, cold winters, and short, mild summers. Weather systems are forced upward by the mountains (orographic lift), causing moisture to drop in the form of rain and snow. The months of June through September offer the most favorable weather for climbing or visiting this area.

== Gallery ==
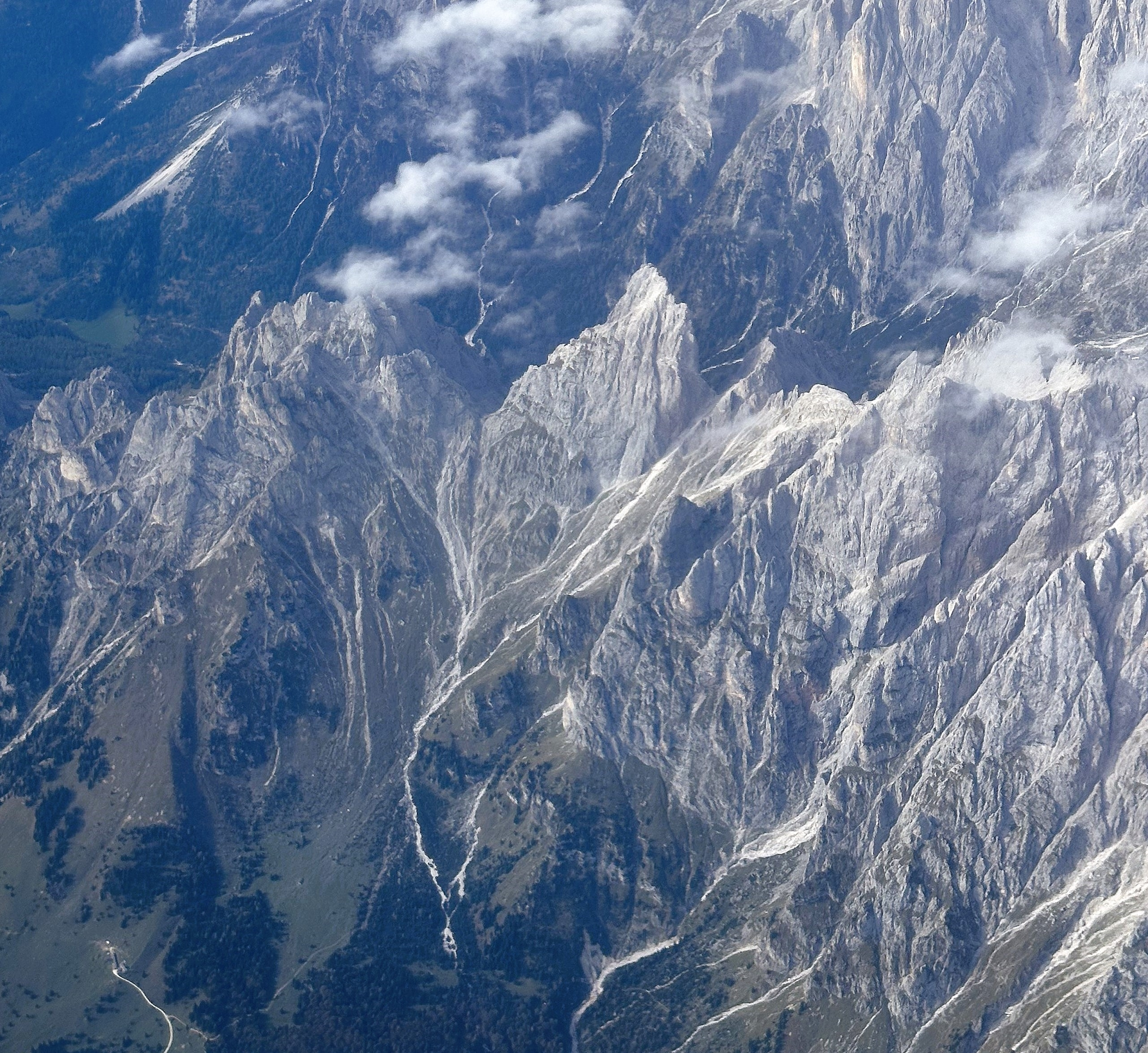
Sass d'Ortiga centered. Viewed from airliner.

== See also ==
- Southern Limestone Alps
