= Cima di Ball =

Mountain in Italy

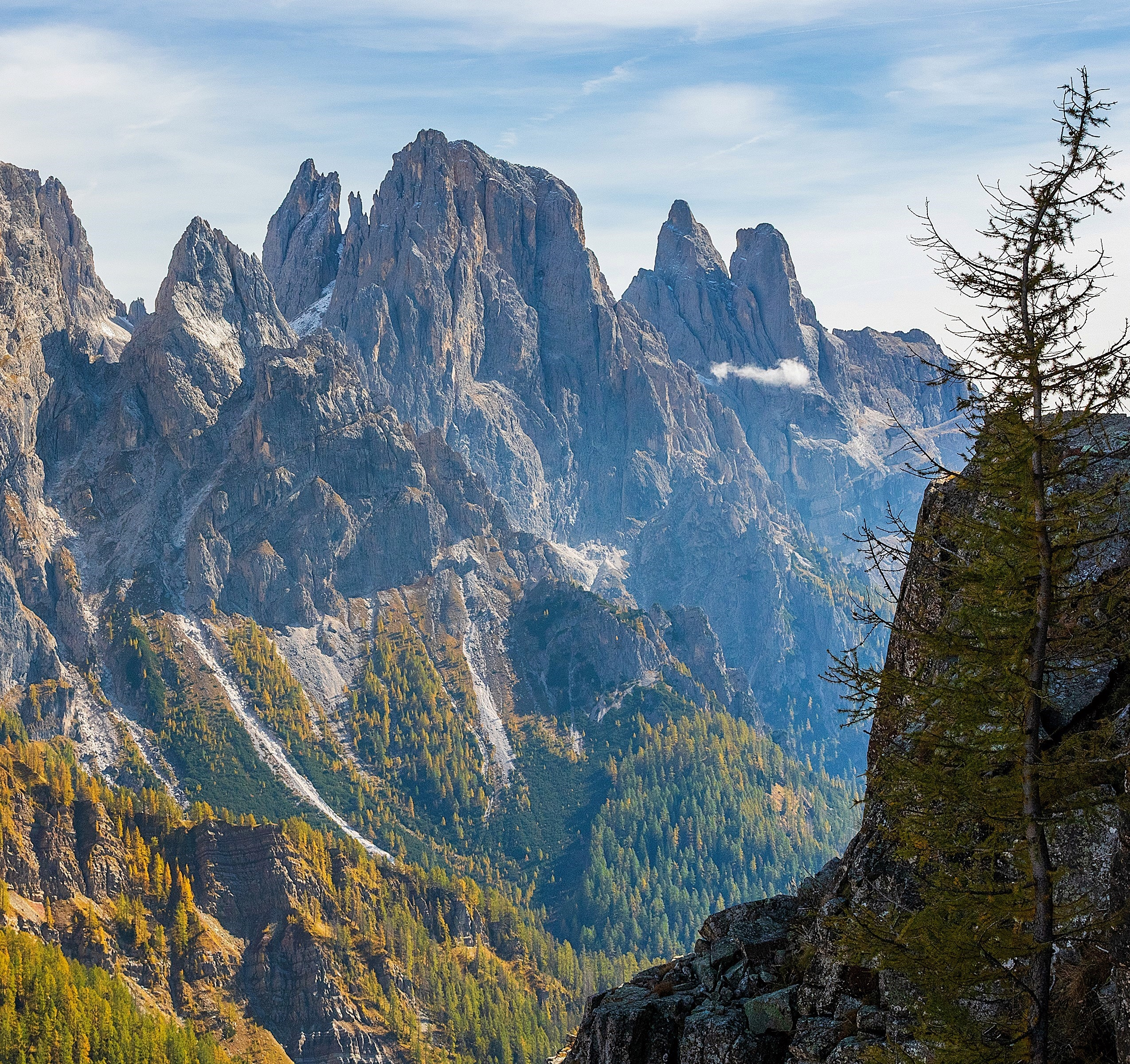
- Northwest aspect, centered

Highest point
- Elevation: 2,802 m (9,193 ft)
- Prominence: 352 m (1,155 ft)
- Parent peak: Vezzana
- Isolation: 1.08 km (0.67 mi)
- Coordinates: 46°14′35″N 11°50′40″E

Naming
- Etymology: John Ball

Geography
- Location within Italy
- Country: Italy
- Region: Trentino-Alto Adige/Südtirol
- Protected area: Paneveggio-Pale di San Martino Natural Park
- Parent range: Dolomites; Pale di San Martino
- Topo map: Tabacco Maps Pale di San Martino

Geology
- Rock age: Triassic
- Rock type: Dolomite

Climbing
- First ascent: 1869 Leslie Stephen (solo)

Cima di Ball is a mountain in Trentino-Alto Adige/Südtirol of northern Italy.

== Description ==
Cima di Ball is a 2,802-meter-elevation (9,193-foot) summit in the Pale di San Martino group of the Dolomites. The peak is located four kilometers (2.5 miles) southeast of San Martino di Castrozza mountain resort, and the peak is within Paneveggio-Pale di San Martino Natural Park, a UNESCO World Heritage Site. Precipitation runoff from the mountain's slopes drains into tributaries of the Cismon. Topographic relief is significant as the summit rises 1,700 meters (5,577 feet) above the Cismon in 2.5 kilometers (1.55 miles), and 540 meters (1,772 feet) above the Rifugio Pradidali in 0.75 kilometer (0.46 mile). The nearest higher neighbor is Cima Immink, 1.08 kilometers (0.67 mile) to the north-northeast. The mountain's Italian toponym translates as "Ball Peak." The peak was first climbed and named in 1869 by Leslie Stephen to honor his friend John Ball (1818–1889), a fellow mountaineer who was the first to climb a major peak in the Dolomites (Monte Pelmo in 1857). John Ball authored The Alpine Guide which helped popularize the region among climbers and travelers.

== Climate ==
Based on the Köppen climate classification, Cima di Ball is located in an alpine climate zone with long, cold winters, and short, mild summers. Weather systems are forced upward by the mountains (orographic lift), causing moisture to drop in the form of rain and snow. The months of June through September offer the most favorable weather for climbing or visiting this area.

== Gallery ==
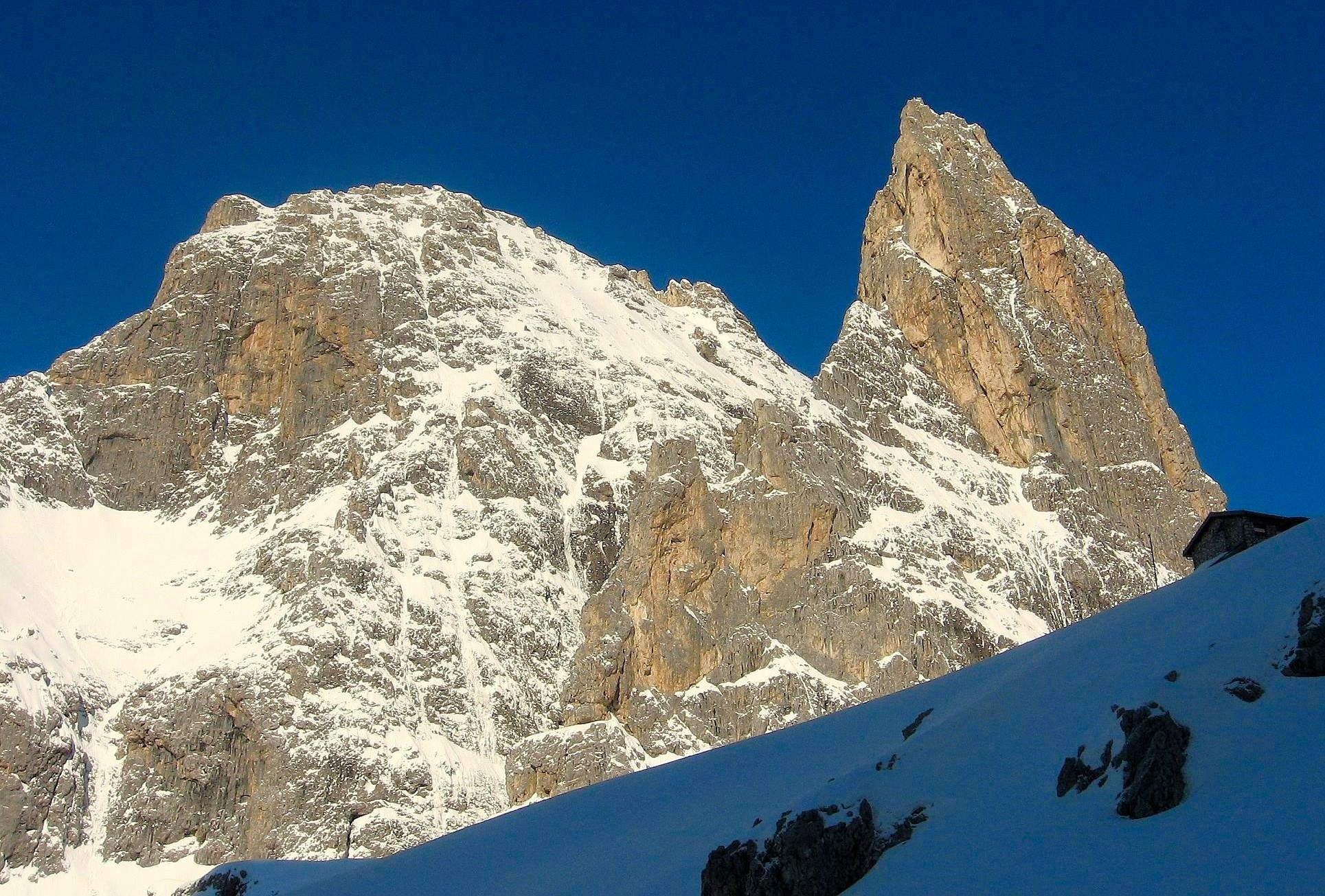
East aspect of Cima di Ball (left) and Campanile Pradidali (right) rise above Rifugio Pradidali

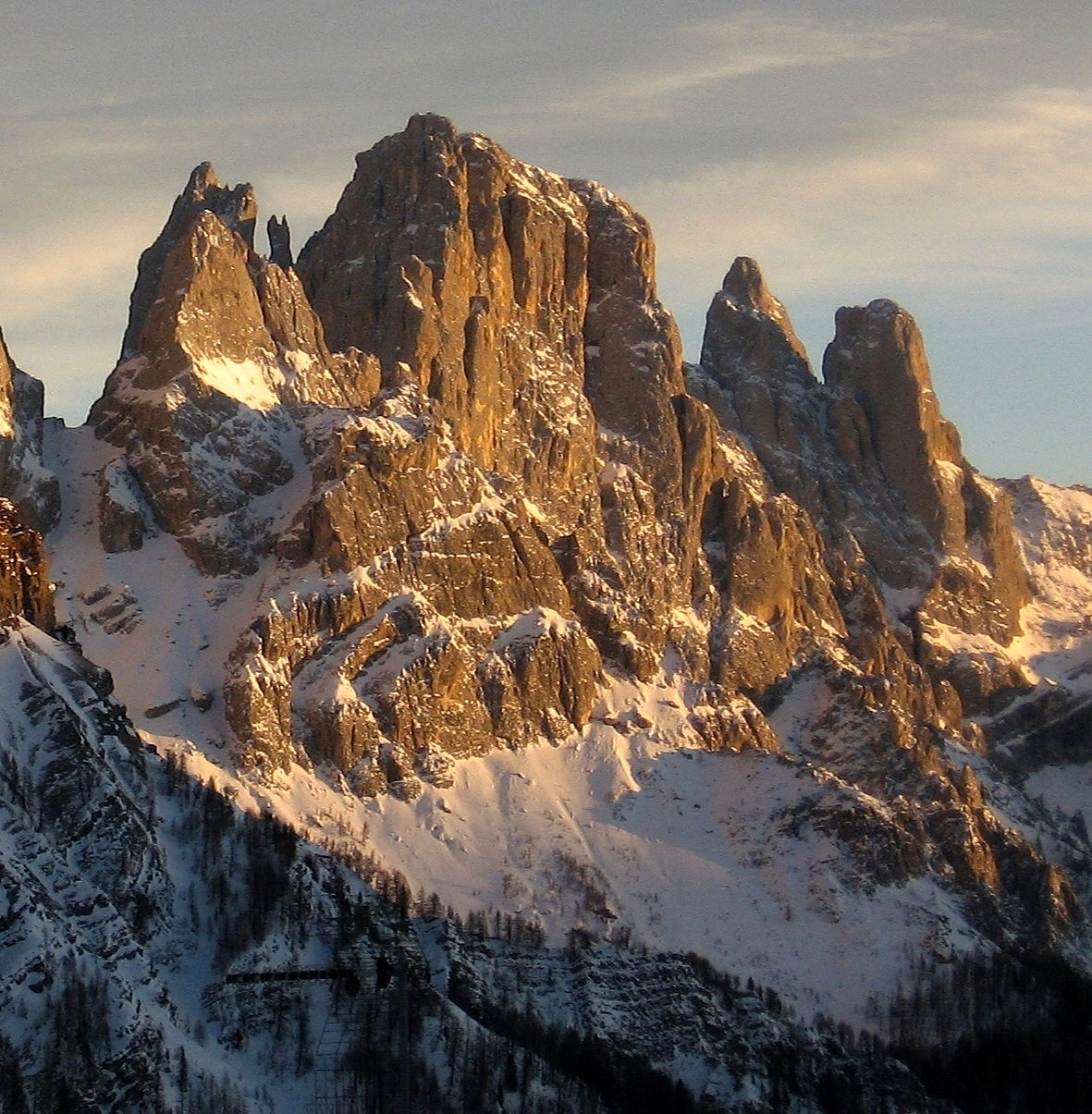
Sunset at Cima di Ball

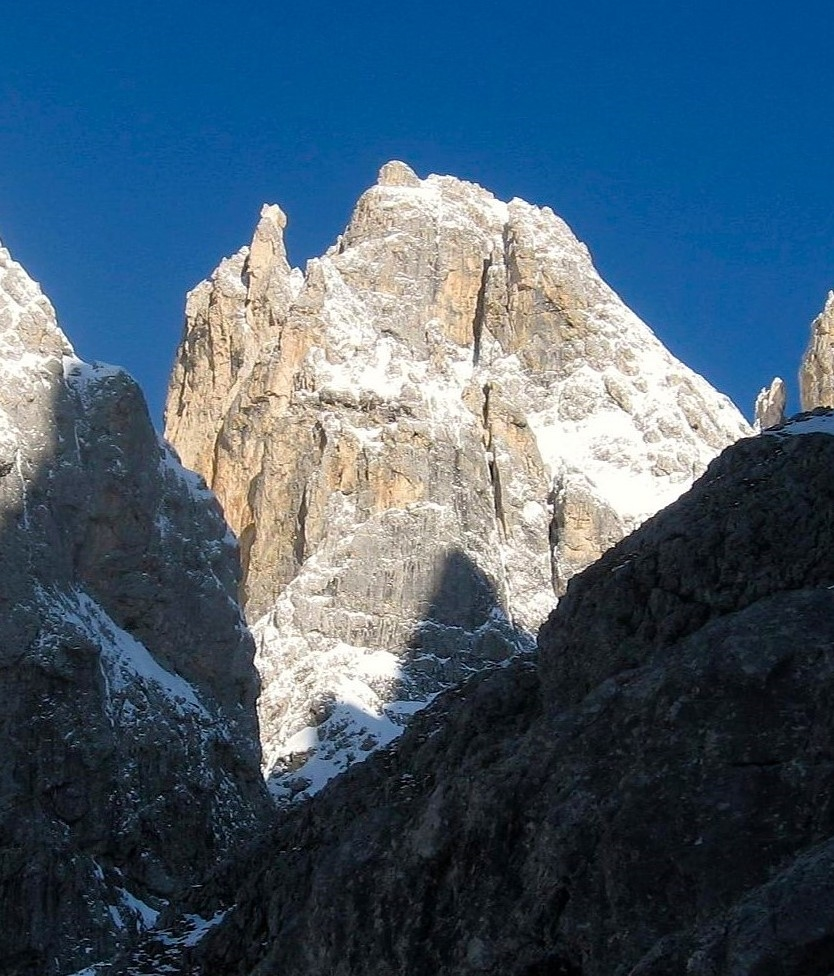
Southeast aspect

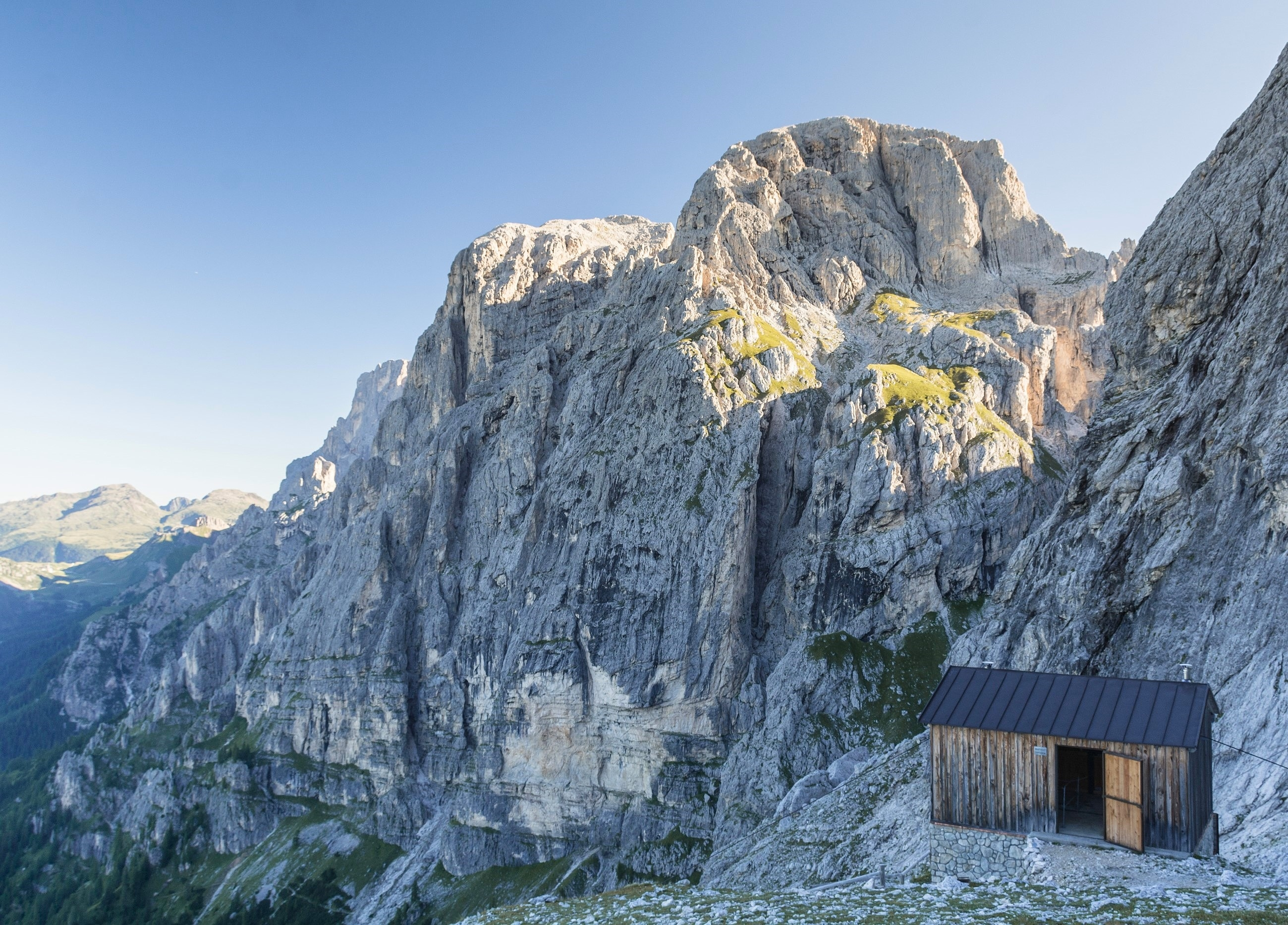
South aspect of Cima di Ball viewed from Velo della Madonna mountain hut

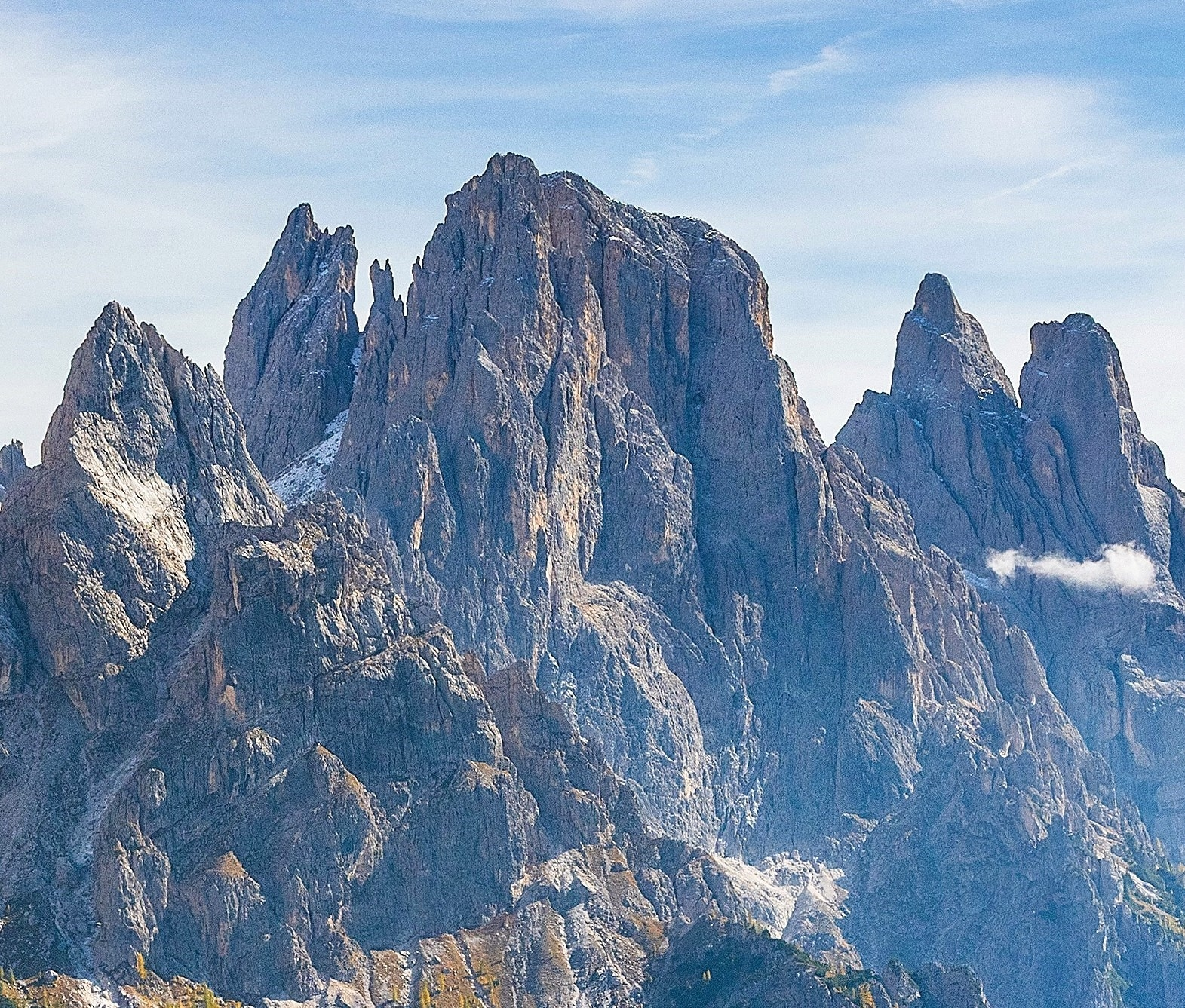
Cima di Ball centered

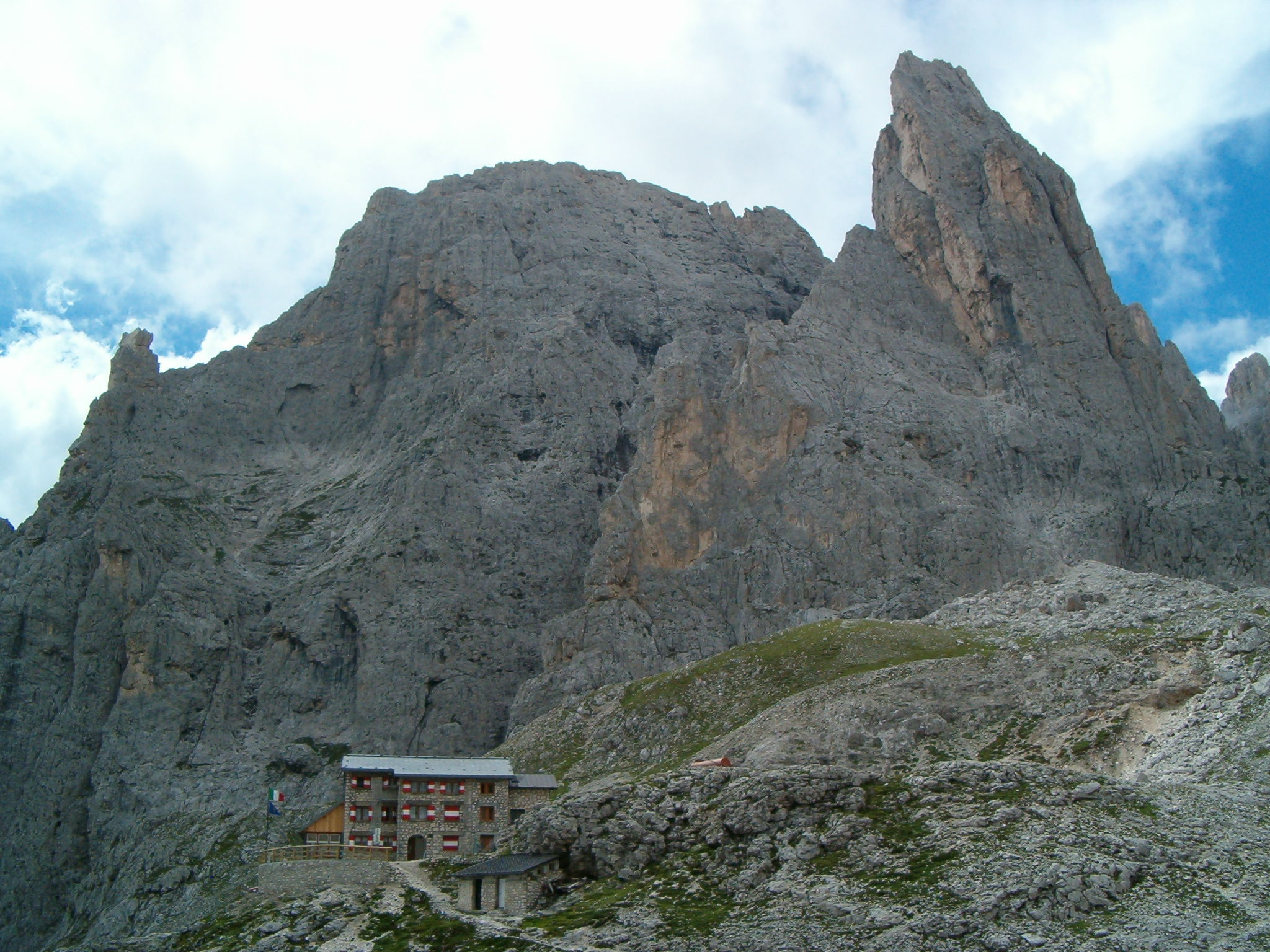
East aspect of Cima di Ball (center) and Campanile Pradidali (right) rise above Rifugio Pradidali

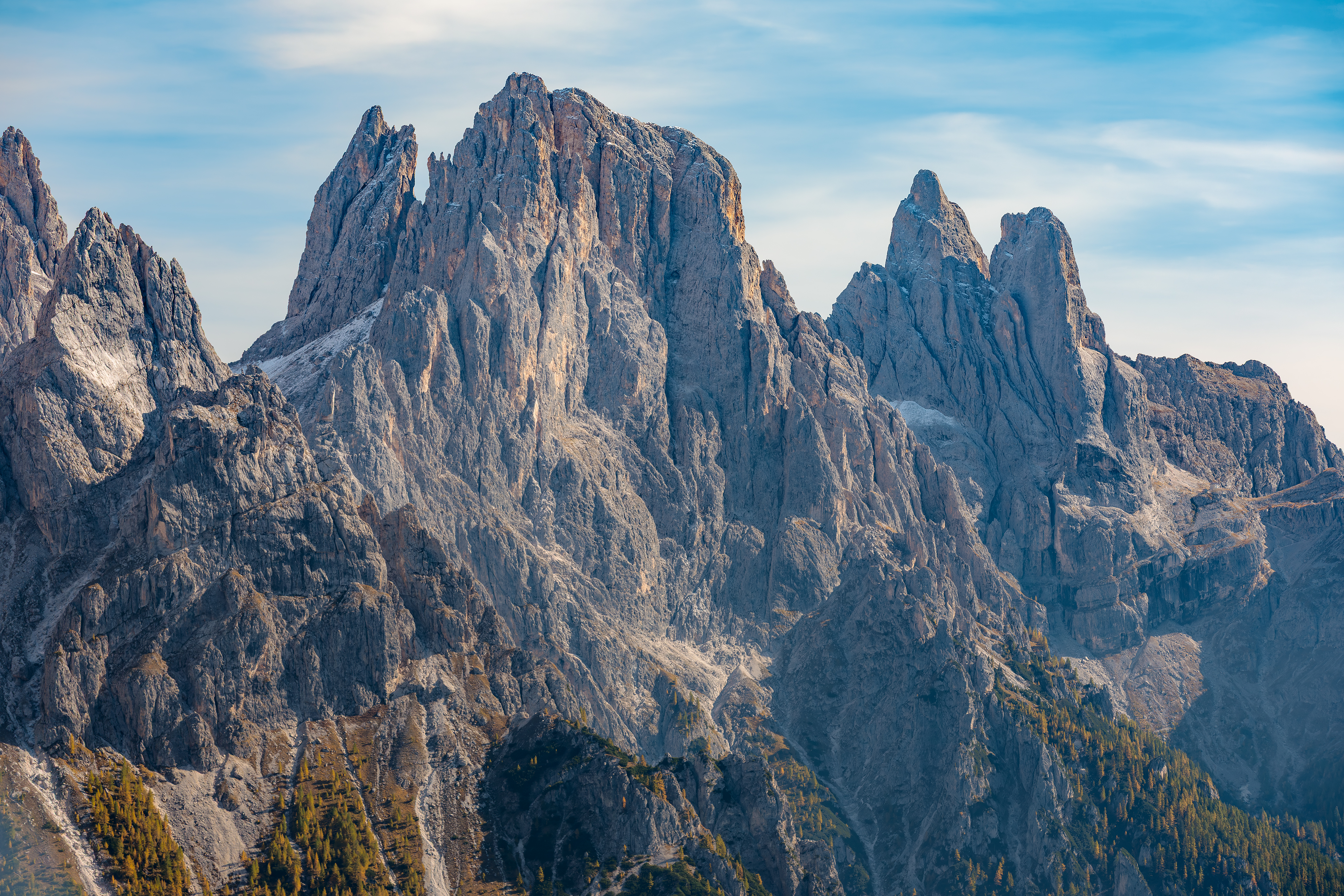
Cima di Ball left of centre

== See also ==
- Southern Limestone Alps
