= Cima della Rosetta =

Mountain in Italy

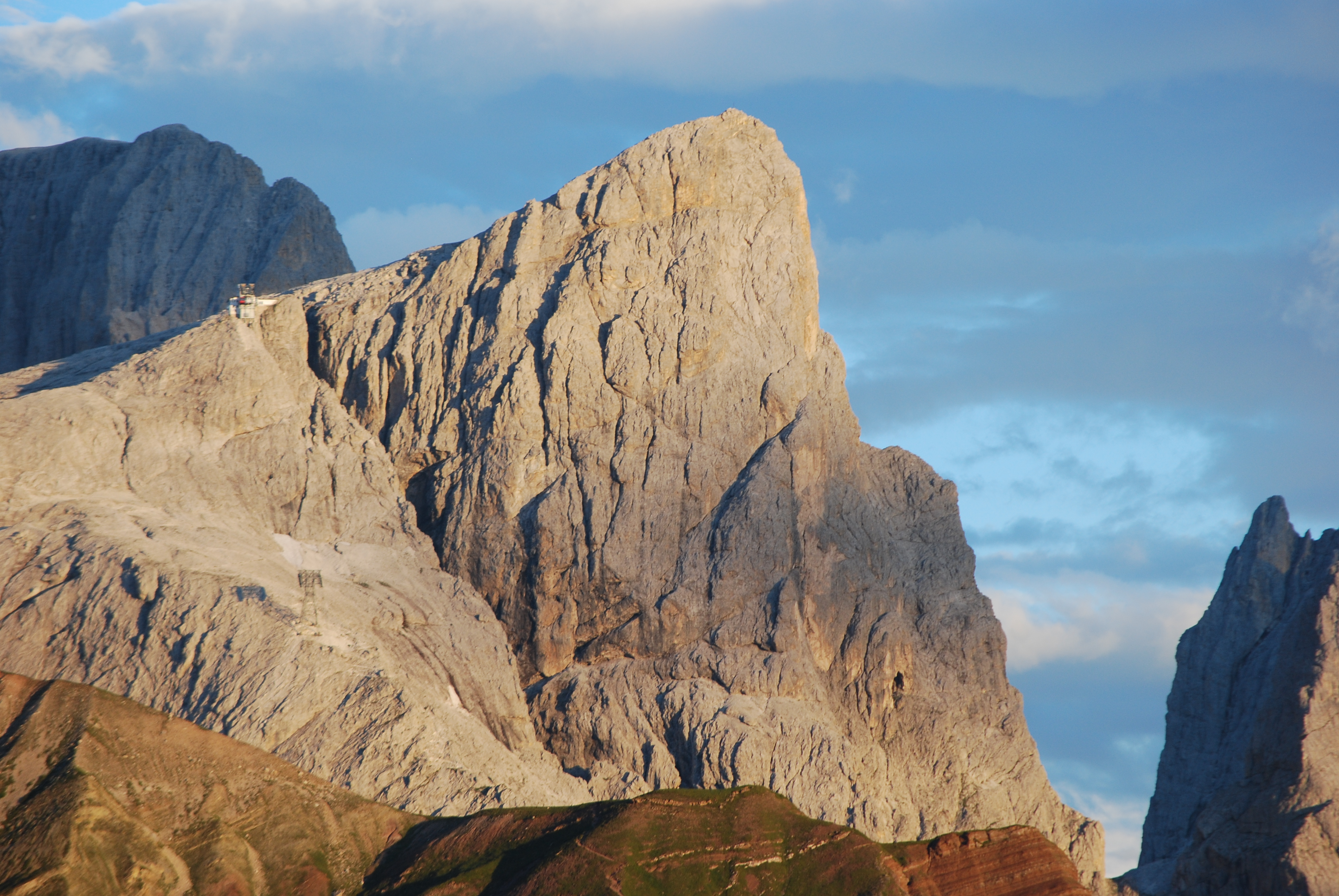
- Northwest aspect

Highest point
- Elevation: 2,743 m (8,999 ft)
- Prominence: 171 m (561 ft)
- Parent peak: Vezzana
- Isolation: 1.13 km (0.70 mi)
- Coordinates: 46°15′46″N 11°49′53″E

Geography
- Location within Italy
- Country: Italy
- Region: Trentino-Alto Adige/Südtirol
- Protected area: Paneveggio-Pale di San Martino Natural Park
- Parent range: Dolomites; Pale di San Martino
- Topo map: Tabacco Map 022 Pale di San Martino

Geology
- Rock age: Triassic
- Rock type: Dolomite

Cima della Rosetta is a mountain in Trentino-Alto Adige/Südtirol of northern Italy.

== Description ==
Cima della Rosetta is a 2,743-meter-elevation (8,999-foot) summit in the Pale di San Martino group of the Dolomites. The peak is located two kilometers (1.2 miles) east of San Martino di Castrozza overlooking the mountain resort, and the peak is within Paneveggio-Pale di San Martino Natural Park, a UNESCO World Heritage Site. A gondola and cable car lifts visitors from the resort to the north shoulder of the peak. Precipitation runoff from the mountain's slopes drains into tributaries of the Cismon. Topographic relief is significant as the summit rises 1,340 meters (4,396 feet) above the Cismon in two kilometers (1.2 miles), and 1,140 meters (3,740 feet) above Rio Val di Roda in one kilometer (0.6 mile). The nearest higher neighbor is Cima Corona, 1.13 kilometers (0.7 mile) to the north-northeast. The mountain's Italian toponym translates as "Rosetta Peak."

== Climate ==
Based on the Köppen climate classification, Cima della Rosetta is located in an alpine climate zone with long, cold winters, and short, mild summers. Weather systems are forced upward by the mountains (orographic lift), causing moisture to drop in the form of rain and snow. The months of June through September offer the most favorable weather for climbing or visiting this area.

== Gallery ==
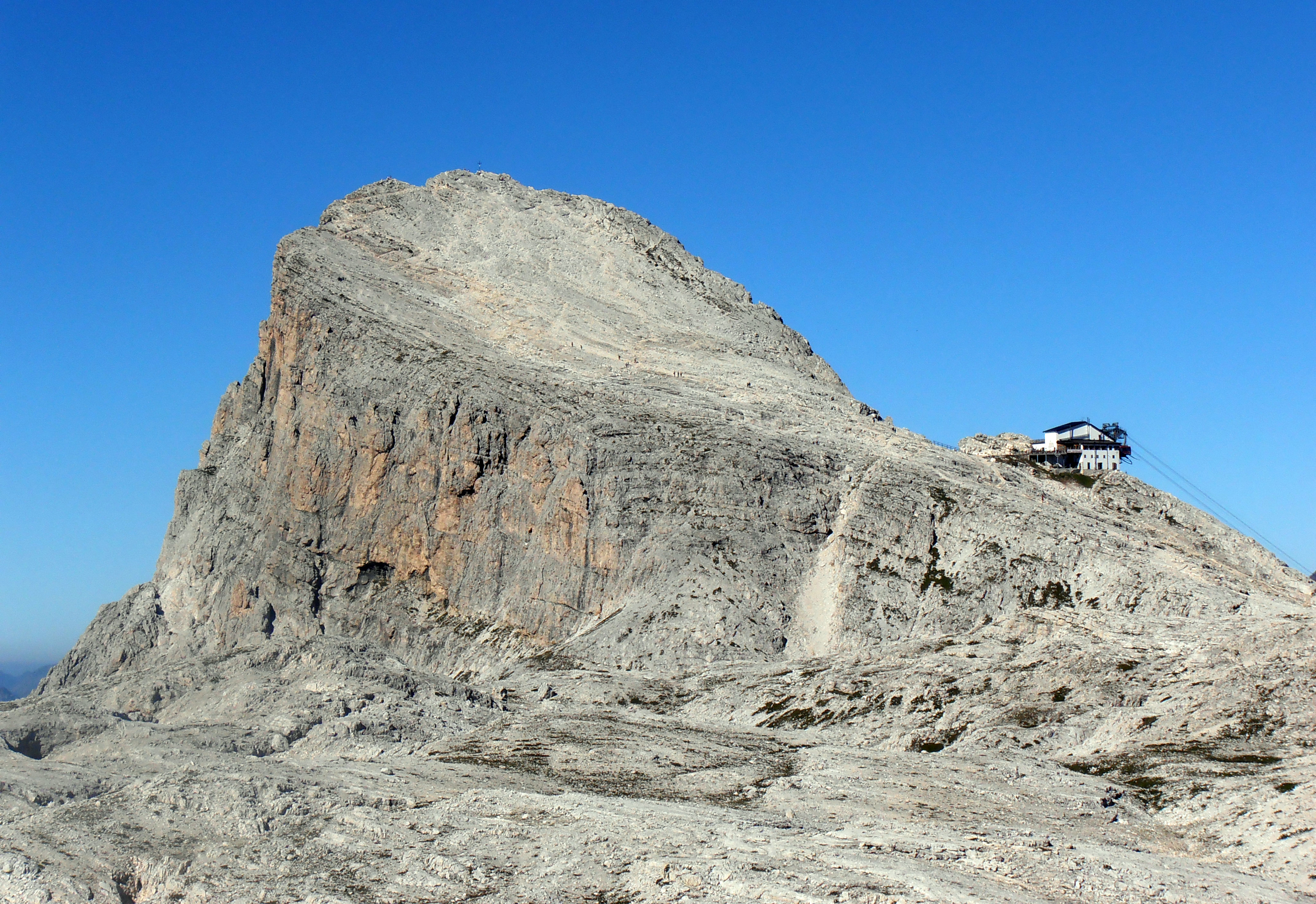
East aspect

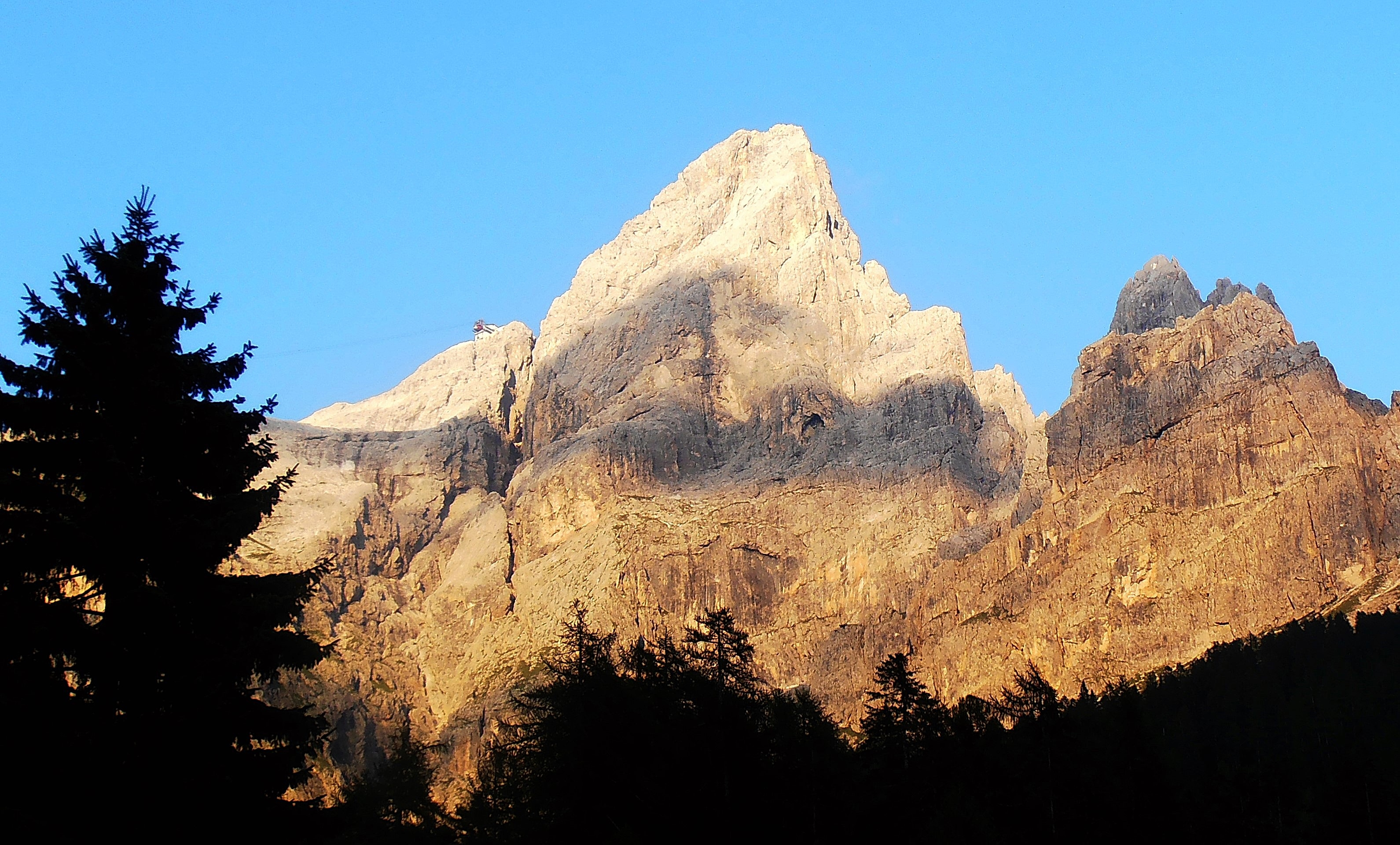
West aspect

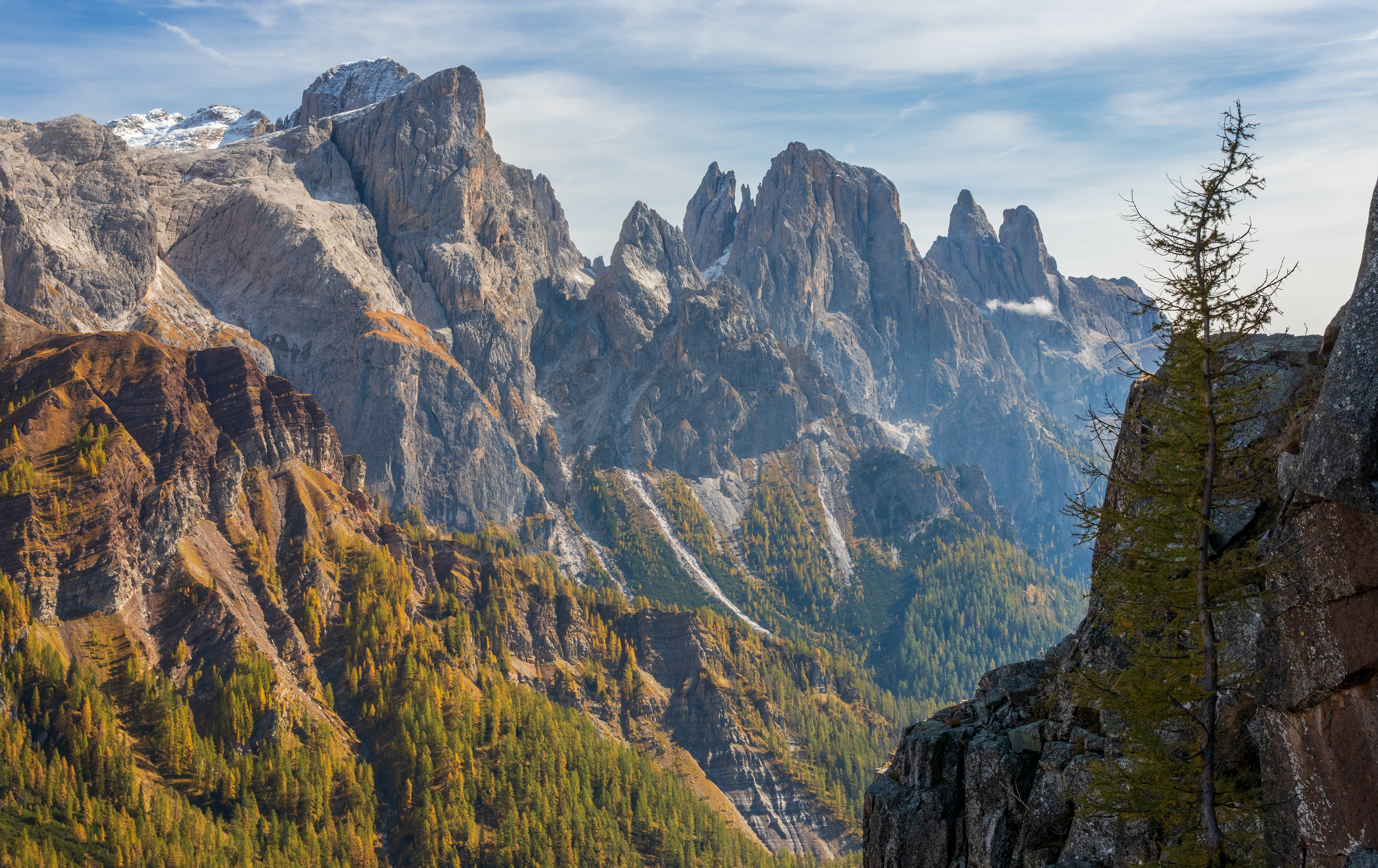
Rosetta to left

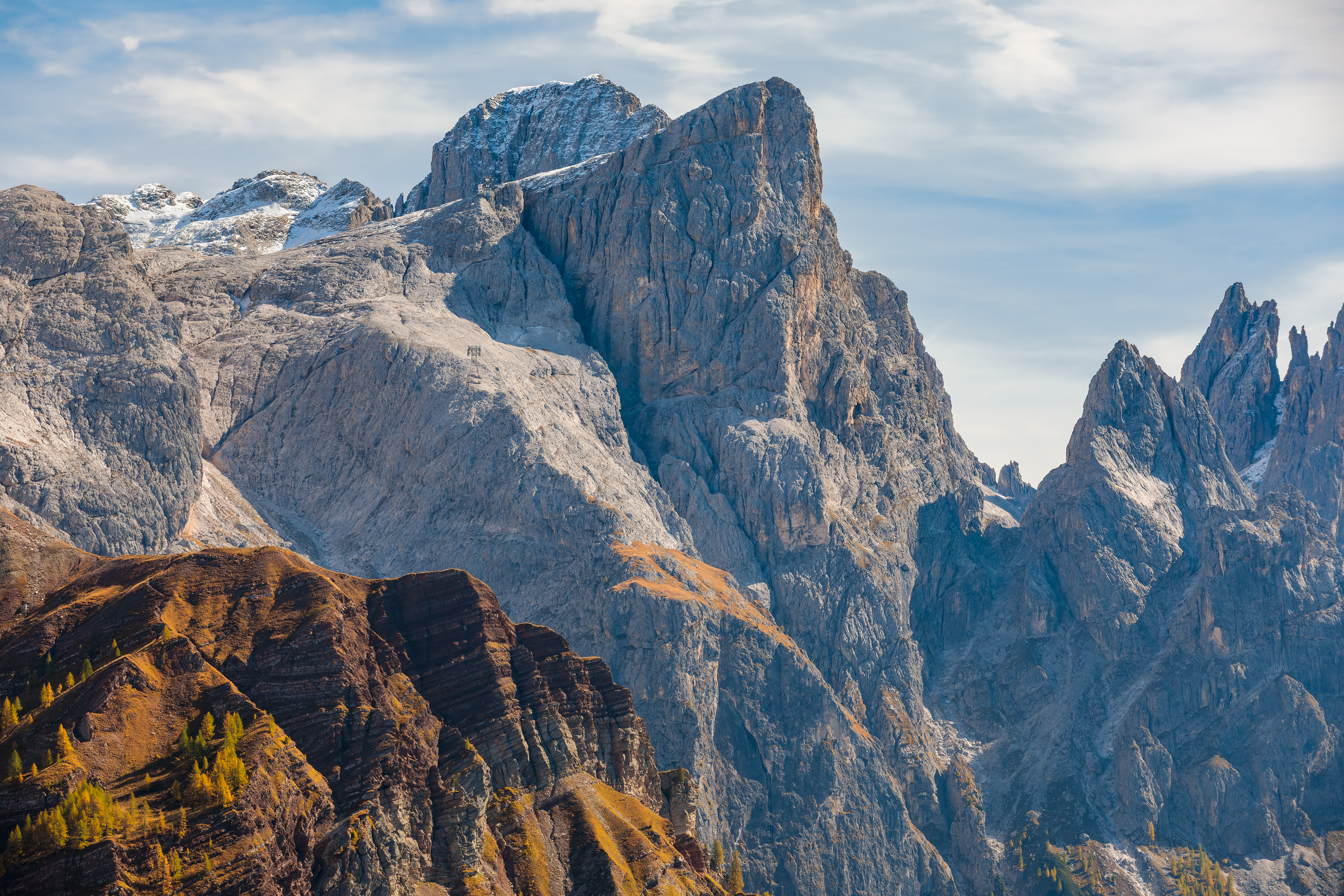
Rosetta centered

== See also ==
- Southern Limestone Alps
