= Cima di Fradusta =

Mountain in Italy

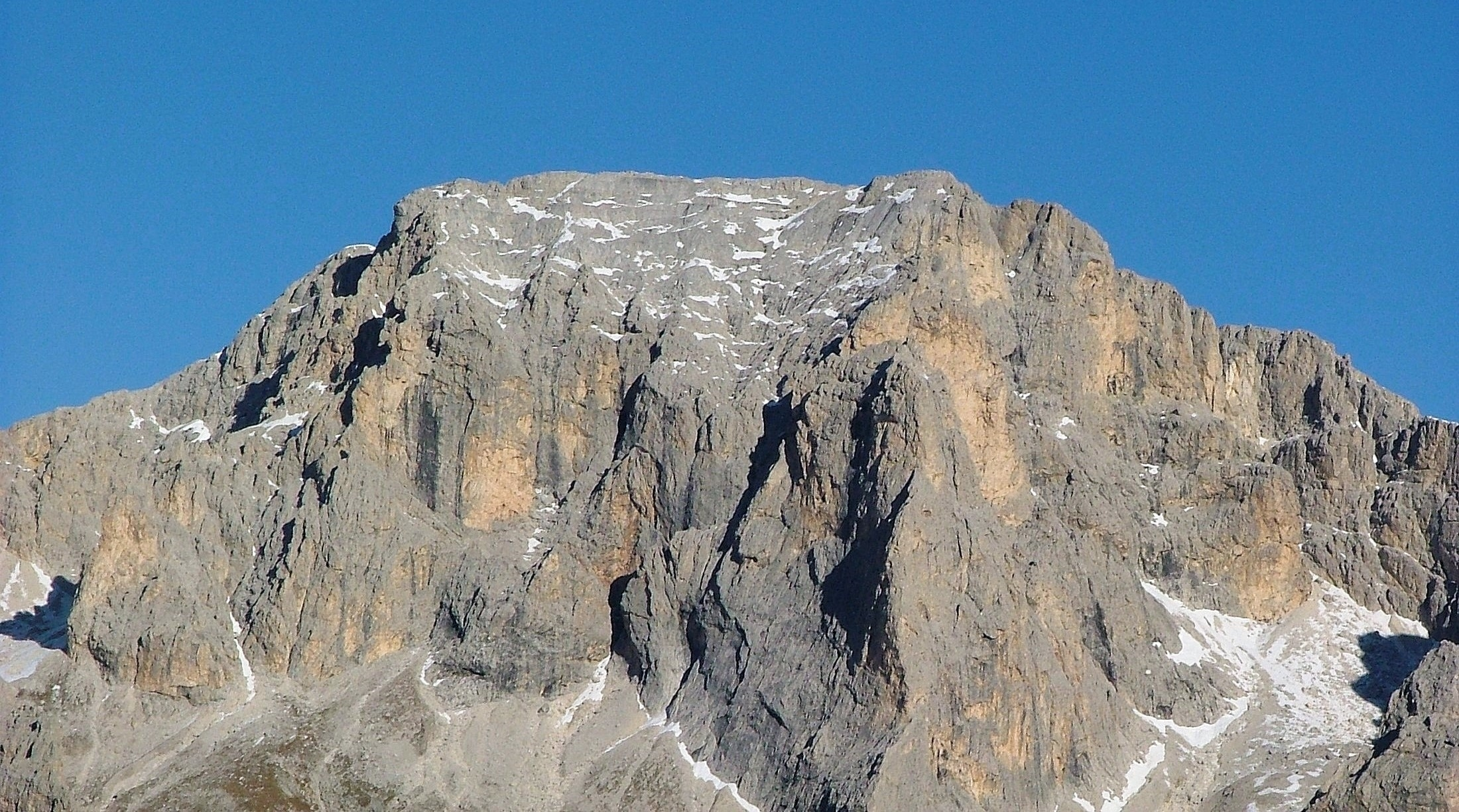
- South face

Highest point
- Elevation: 2,939 m (9,642 ft)
- Prominence: 282 m (925 ft)
- Parent peak: Pala di San Martino
- Isolation: 1.77 km (1.10 mi)
- Coordinates: 46°15′04″N 11°52′25″E

Geography
- Location within Italy
- Country: Italy
- Region: Trentino-Alto Adige/Südtirol
- Protected area: Paneveggio-Pale di San Martino Natural Park
- Parent range: Dolomites; Pale di San Martino
- Topo map: Tabacco Maps Pale di San Martino

Geology
- Rock age: Triassic
- Rock type: Dolomite

Climbing
- First ascent: 1869 Leslie Stephen

Cima di Fradusta is a mountain in Trentino-Alto Adige/Südtirol of northern Italy.

== Description ==
Cima di Fradusta is a 2,939-meter-elevation (9,642-foot) summit in the Pale di San Martino group of the Dolomites. The peak is located eight kilometers (5 miles) north-northeast of Primiero San Martino di Castrozza and ranks as the eighth-highest peak in Paneveggio-Pale di San Martino Natural Park, a UNESCO World Heritage Site. Precipitation runoff from the mountain's slopes drains south into tributaries of the Cismon, and north into tributaries of the Piave. Topographic relief is significant as the summit rises 1,540 meters (5,052 feet) above Torrente Canali in two kilometers (1.2 miles). The nearest higher neighbor is Pala di San Martino, 1.77 kilometers (1.1 miles) to the west. The first ascent of the summit was made in 1869 by Leslie Stephen and guide Colesel Rosso. On July 19, 1957, a Lockheed P2V-6 Neptune US Navy plane crashed into the south face of Fradusta, killing all 11 crew members. Two days later during the ensuing search, a sister plane crashed into Monte Granero, killing the nine crew members on board.

== Climate ==
Based on the Köppen climate classification, Cima Canali is located in an alpine climate zone with long, cold winters, and short, mild summers. Weather systems are forced upward by the mountains (orographic lift), causing moisture to drop in the form of rain and snow. This climate has supported the Fradusta Glacier on the peak's north slope, however the glacier has experienced rapid retreat with reduction in surface and mass due to climate change. The months of June through September offer the most favorable weather for climbing or visiting this area.

== Gallery ==
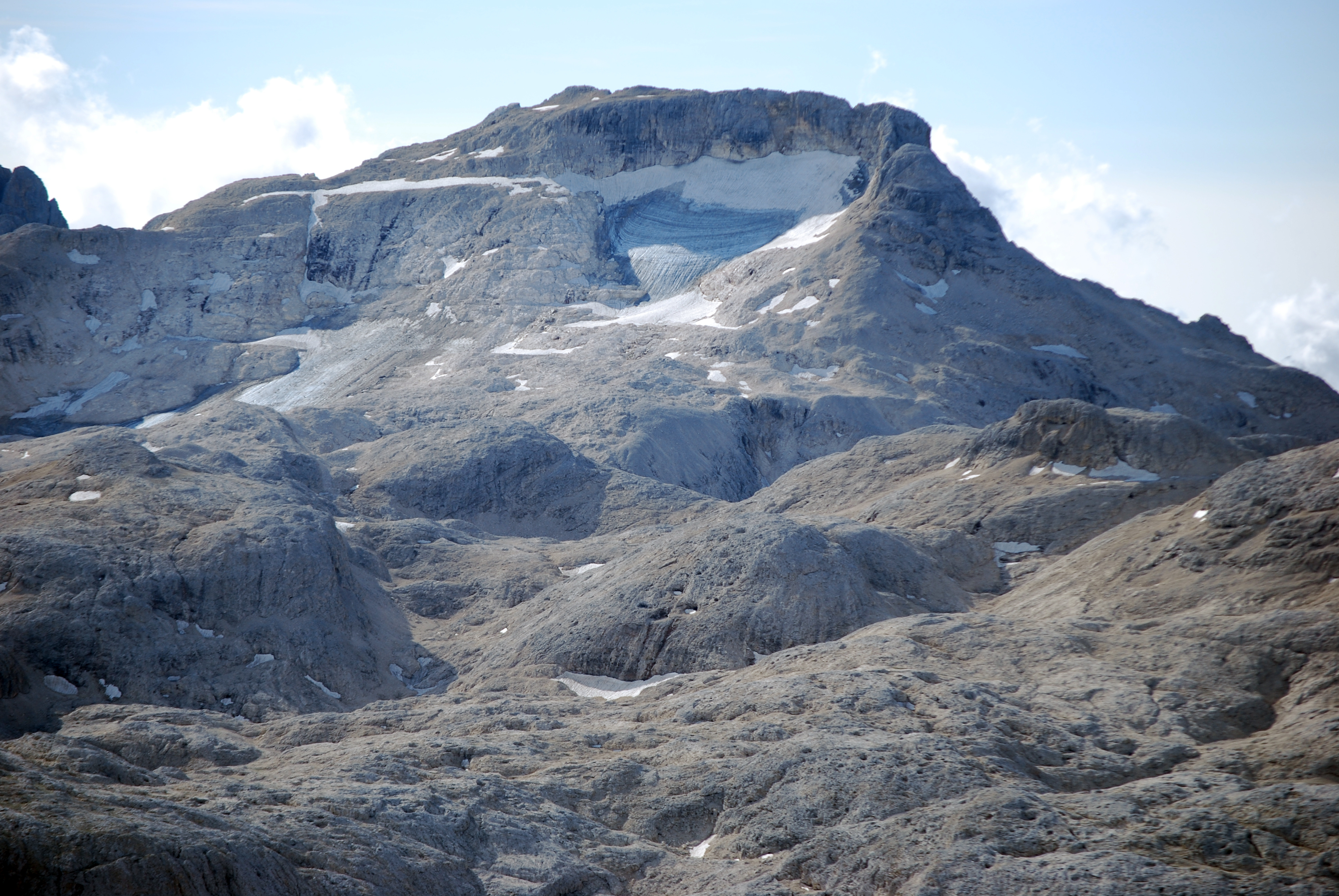
North aspect with Fradusta Glacier remnant

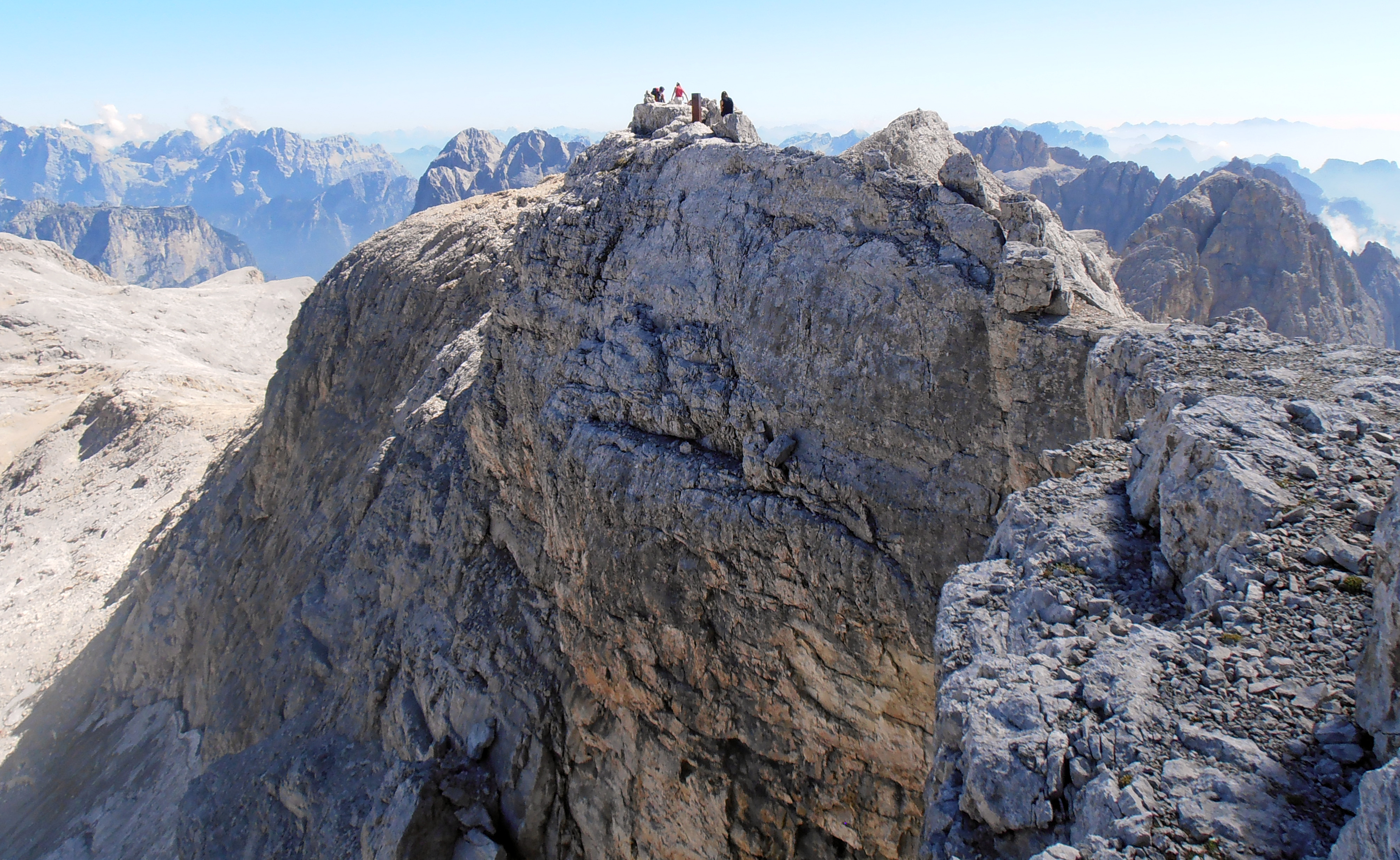
Fradusta summit

== See also ==
- Southern Limestone Alps
