= Croda Grande =

Mountain in Italy

- Ladin: Croda Granda
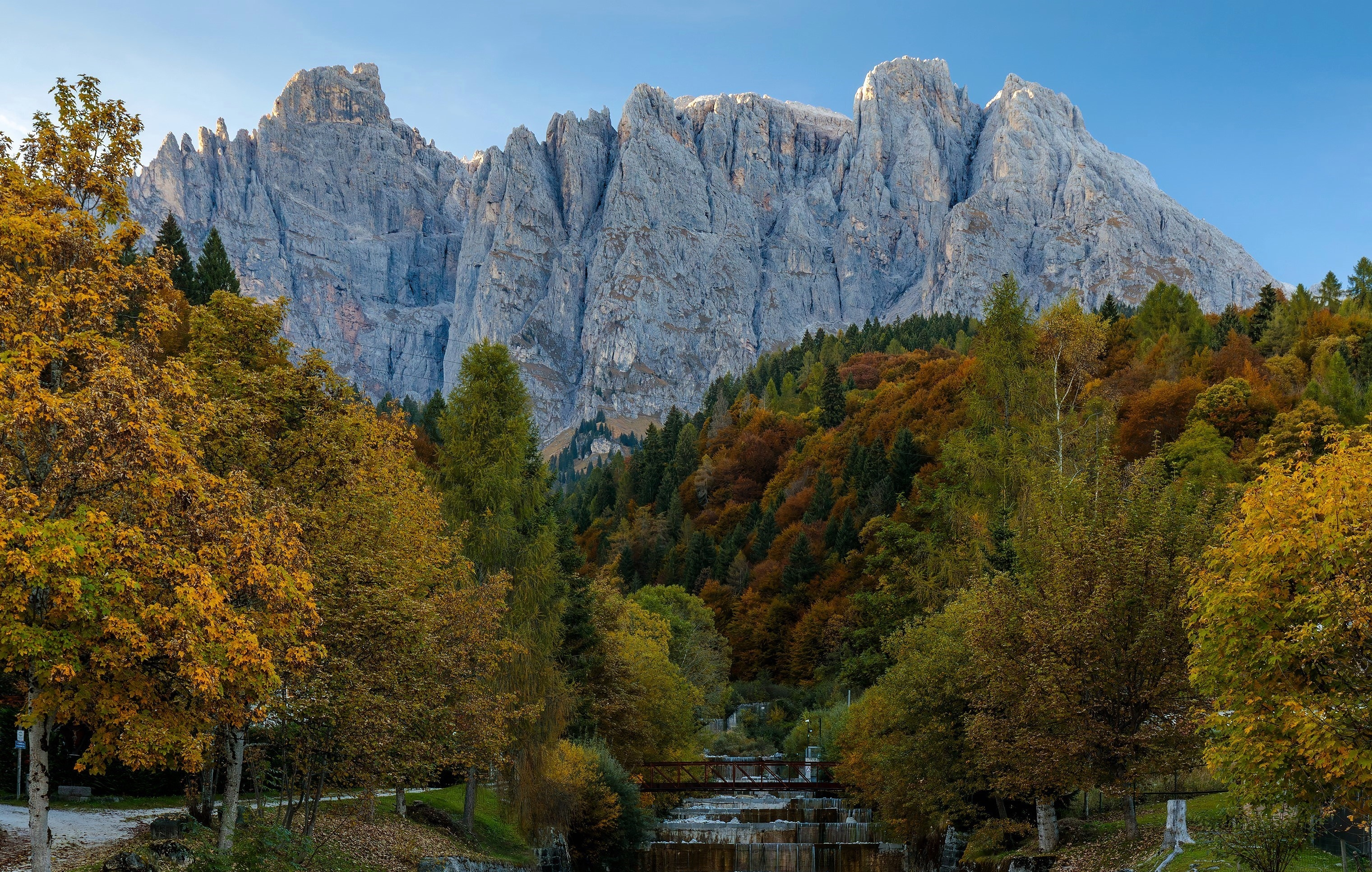
- Southeast aspect

Highest point
- Elevation: 2,849 m (9,347 ft)
- Prominence: 493 m (1,617 ft)
- Parent peak: Vezzana
- Isolation: 2.9 km (1.8 mi)
- Coordinates: 46°14′55″N 11°55′45″E

Geography
- Location within Italy
- Country: Italy
- Region: Trentino-Alto Adige/Südtirol / Veneto
- Protected area: Paneveggio-Pale di San Martino Natural Park
- Parent range: Dolomites; Pale di San Martino
- Topo map: Tabacco Maps Pale di San Martino

Geology
- Rock age: Triassic
- Rock type: Dolomite

Climbing
- First ascent: 1883

Croda Grande is a mountain on the boundary shared by the Trentino-Alto Adige/Südtirol and Veneto regions of northern Italy.

== Description ==
Croda Grande is a 2,849-meter-elevation (9,347-foot) summit in the Pale di San Martino group of the Dolomites. Set on the common boundary between the provinces of Belluno and Trentino, the peak is located three kilometers (1.86 miles) northwest of the municipality of Gosaldo and within Paneveggio-Pale di San Martino Natural Park, a UNESCO World Heritage Site. Precipitation runoff from the mountain's slopes drains into tributaries of the Piave. Topographic relief is significant as the summit rises 1,250 meters (4,101 feet) along the south slope in 1.5 kilometers (0.93 mile), and 1,050 meters (3,445 feet) above the north slope in one kilometer (0.6 mile). The nearest higher neighbor is Lastei d'Agnèr, 2.9 kilometers (1.8 miles) to the northeast. The first ascent of Croda Grande was likely made before 1877 by Tommaso Dal Col and chamois hunters, however the first documented ascent of the summit was made on August 28, 1883, by Tommaso Dal Col and Gustav Euringer via the southeast side. The mountain's toponym translates as "Big Rock" with Croda meaning rock, crag or cliff, and Grande meaning big.

== Climate ==
Based on the Köppen climate classification, Croda Grande is located in an alpine climate zone with long, cold winters, and short, mild summers. Weather systems are forced upward by the mountains (orographic lift), causing moisture to drop in the form of rain and snow. The months of June through September offer the most favorable weather for climbing or visiting this area.

== See also ==
- Southern Limestone Alps
