= Pala group =

Coordinates: 46°16′00″N 11°52′00″E

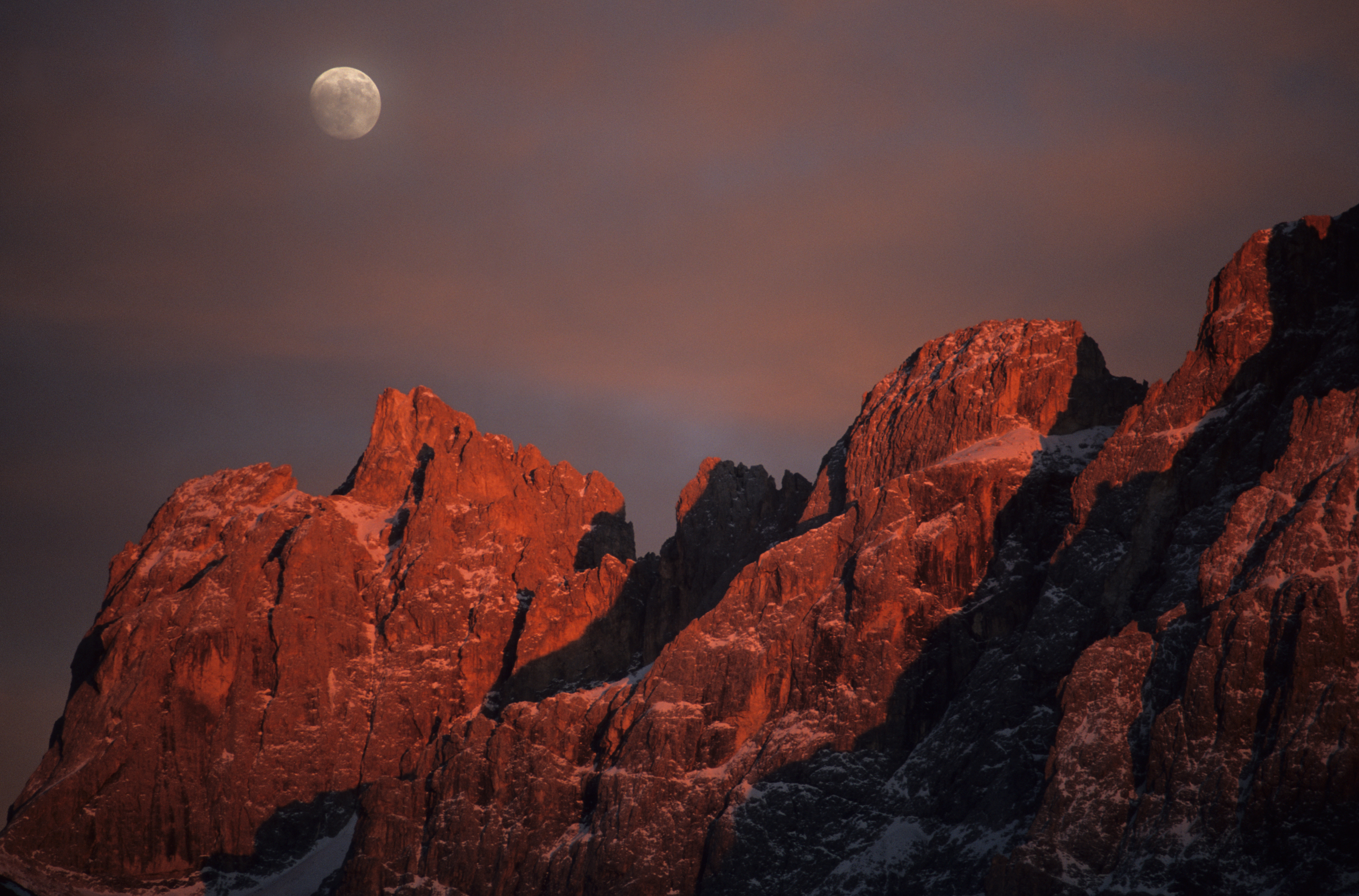

Highest point
- Peak: Cima Vezzana
- Elevation: 3,192 m (10,472 ft)

Geography
- Country: Italy
- Parent range: Dolomites, Eastern Alps

The Pala group (also known as Pale di San Martino) is the largest massif of the Dolomites, with about 240 km^{2} of surface, located between eastern Trentino and Veneto (province of Belluno), in the area between Primiero (valleys of Cismon, Canali, Travignolo), Valle del Biois (Falcade, Canale d'Agordo) and Agordino.

In the central sector of the group, discovered by the Marquis Déodat Gratet de Dolomieu in 1788, consisting of dolomite, a sedimentary rock formed by double calcium carbonate and magnesium, extends the plateau, on an area of about 50 km^{2}, forming a huge empty space, rocky and almost lunar that fluctuates between 2500 and 2800 m above sea level.

The part of the group extended in Trentino is entirely included in the Paneveggio-Pale di San Martino Natural Park. According to some sources, the group inspired the Belluno writer Dino Buzzati (a great lover of the chain) in the setting of his novel "The Tartar Steppe". Due to the exceptional universal value of this natural beauty, the geological system of the Pale is included in the site "The Dolomites", declared in 2009 a UNESCO World Heritage Site.

== Main peaks ==
- Vezzana, 3,192 m
- Cimon della Pala, 3,184 m
- Cima dei Bureloni, 3,130 m
- Cima del Focobon, 3,054 m
- Pala di San Martino, 2,982 m
- Fradusta, 2,939 m
- Mulaz, 2,906 m
- Cima Canali, 2,900 m
- Monte Agnèr 2,872 m
- Croda Grande 2,849 m
- Sass Maor, 2,814 m
- Cima di Ball, 2,802 m
- Cima Pradidali, 2,774 m
- Cima Madonna, 2,752 m
- Rosetta, 2,743 m
- Sass d'Ortiga 2,649 m
