= Pala di San Martino =

Mountain in Italy

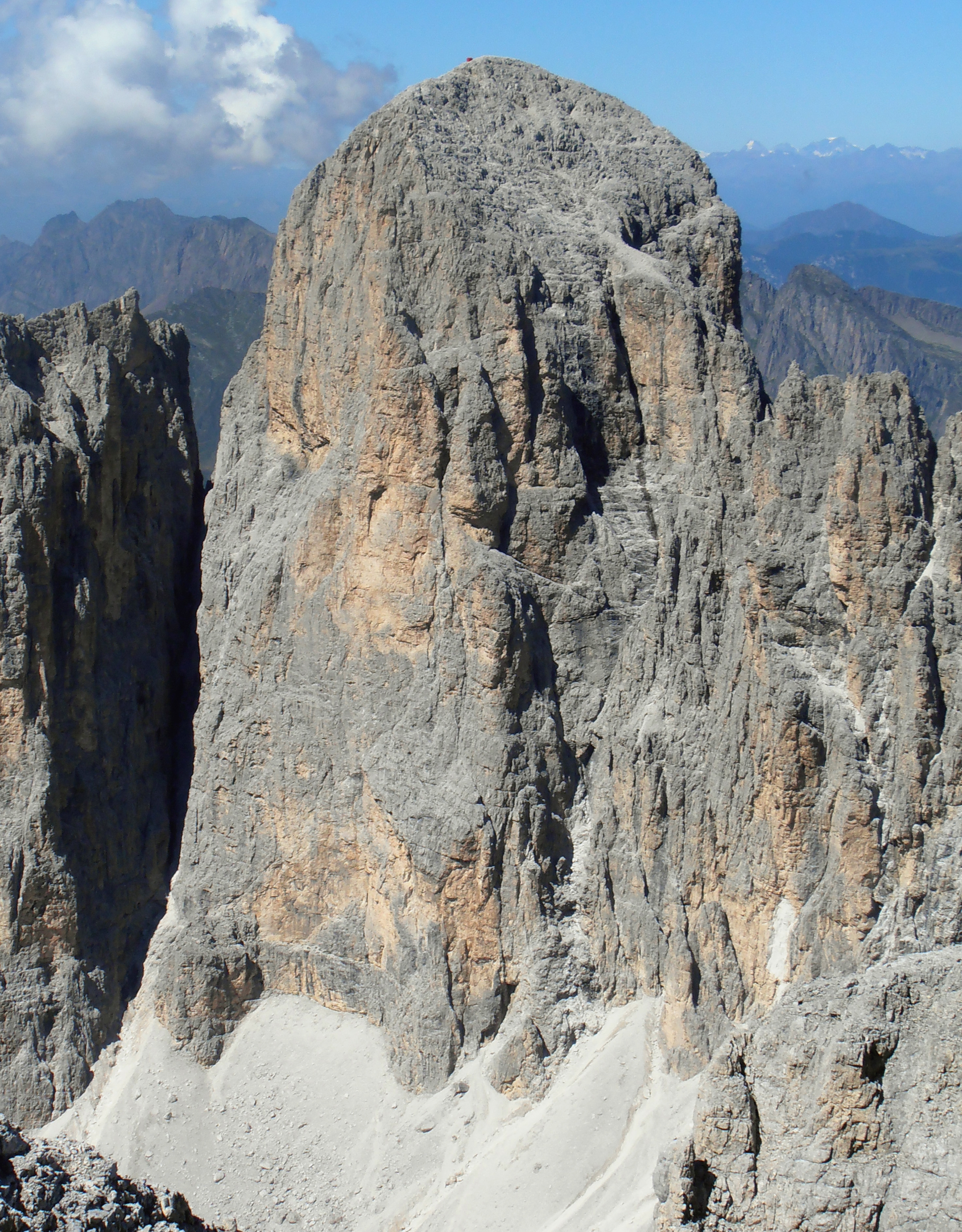
- East aspect

Highest point
- Elevation: 2,982 m (9,783 ft)
- Prominence: 416 m (1,365 ft)
- Parent peak: Vezzana
- Isolation: 3.54 km (2.20 mi)
- Coordinates: 46°15′14″N 11°51′01″E

Geography
- Location within Italy
- Country: Italy
- Region: Trentino-Alto Adige/Südtirol
- Protected area: Paneveggio-Pale di San Martino Natural Park
- Parent range: Dolomites; Pale di San Martino
- Topo map: Tabacco Map 022 Pale di San Martino

Geology
- Rock age: Triassic
- Rock type: Dolomite

Climbing
- First ascent: June 23, 1878

Pala di San Martino is a mountain in Trentino-Alto Adige/Südtirol of northern Italy.

== Description ==
Pala di San Martino is a 2,982-meter-elevation (9,783-foot) summit in the Pale di San Martino group of the Dolomites. The peak is located three kilometers (1.86 miles) east-southeast of San Martino di Castrozza mountain resort, and the peak ranks as the sixth-highest within Paneveggio-Pale di San Martino Natural Park, a UNESCO World Heritage Site. Precipitation runoff from the mountain's slopes drains into tributaries of the Cismon.

Topographic relief is significant as the summit rises 1,780 meters (5,840 feet) above the Cismon in three kilometers (1.86 miles), and 1,380 meters (4,527 feet) above Rio Val di Roda in 1.6 kilometers (1 mile). The nearest higher neighbor is Il Nuvolo, 3.86 kilometers (2.4 miles) to the north-northwest. The mountain's toponym translates as "St. Martin's Shovel." The first ascent of the summit was made in 1878 by Alfred Pallavicini, Julius Meurer, Michele Bettega, and Arcangelo Dimai.

== Climbing ==
Climbing routes with first ascents:

- North Ridge – Pallavicini, Meurer, Bettega, Dimai – (1878)
- South Face – Antonio Dimai, John Swinnerton Phillimore, Arthur Guy Sandars Raynor, Luigi Rizzi – (1896)
- WNW Ridge – Claud Schuster, Antonio Tavernaro, Bortolo Zagonel – (<1898)
- Il Gran Pilastro – Gunther Langes, Erwin Merlet – (1920)
- North Wall via Solleder – Emil Solleder, Franz Kummer – (1926)
- North Wall via Leviti-Beber – A. Leviti, Beber – (1974)
- North Wall via Leviti-Della Sega – A. Leviti, Della Sega – (1974)

== Climate ==
Based on the Köppen climate classification, Pala di San Martino is located in an alpine climate zone with long, cold winters, and short, mild summers. Weather systems are forced upward by the mountains (orographic lift), causing moisture to drop in the form of rain and snow. The months of June through September offer the most favorable weather for climbing or visiting this area.

== Gallery ==
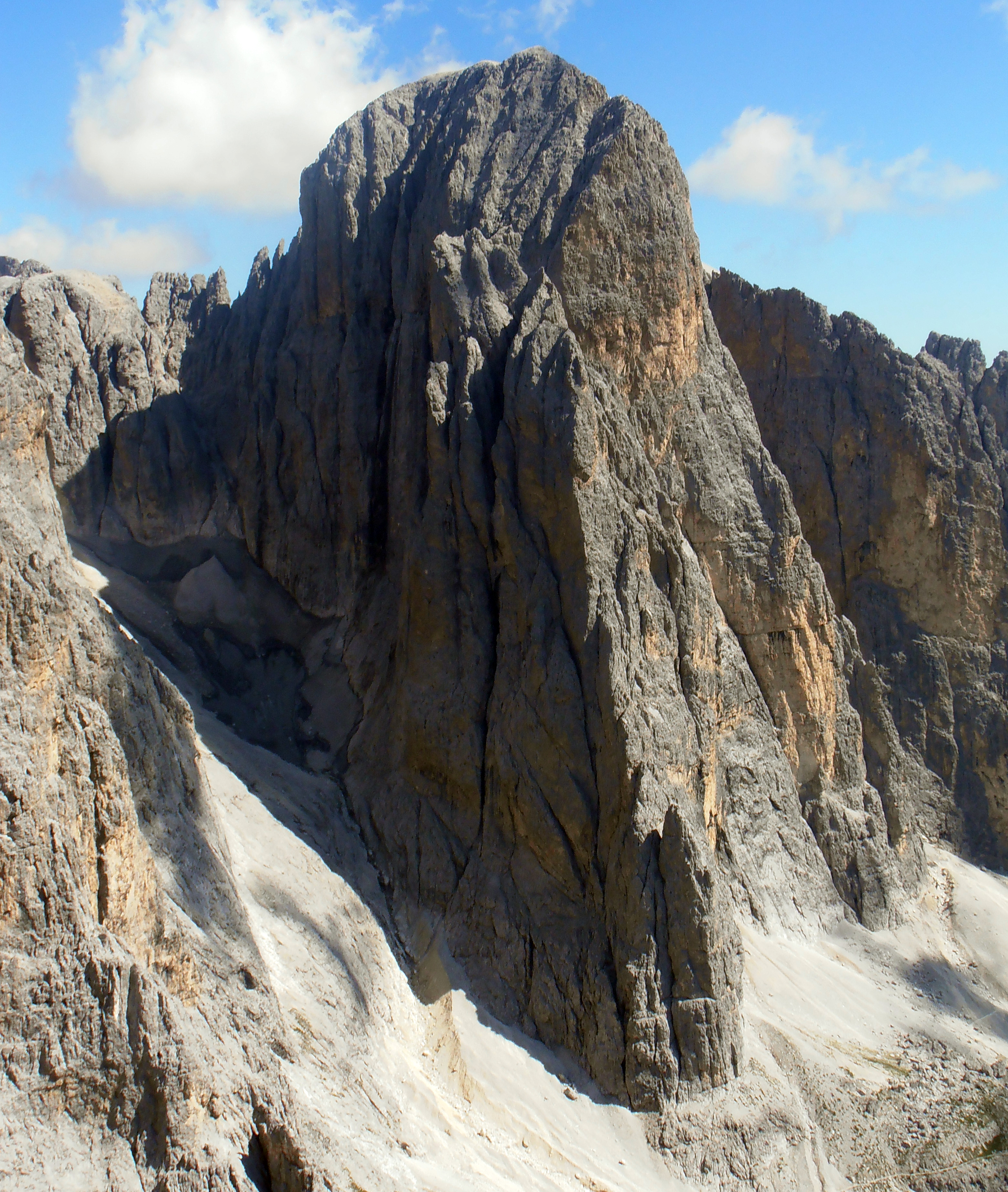
Northwest aspect, from Rosetta

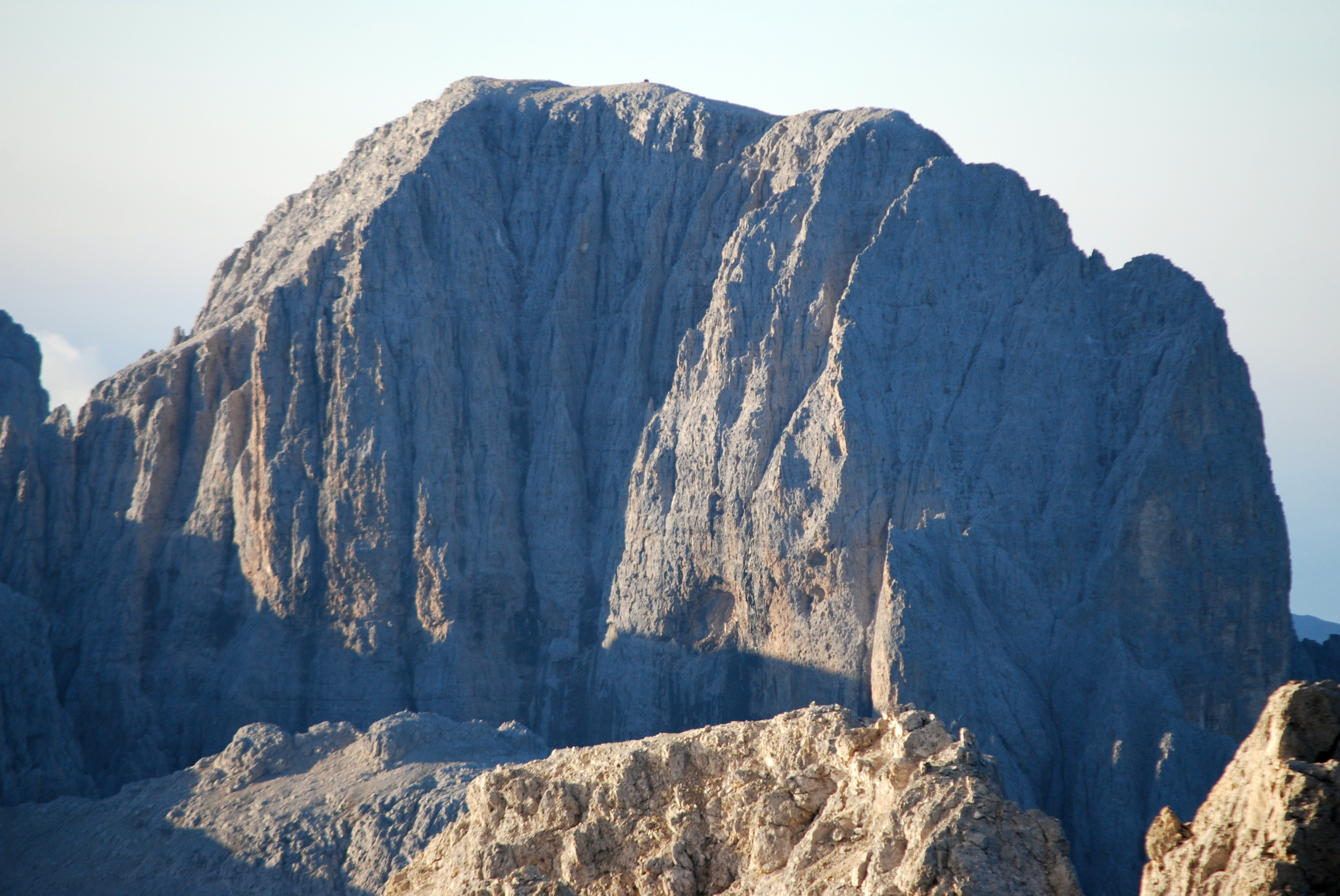
North aspect

== See also ==
- Southern Limestone Alps
