= Monte Agnèr =

Mountain in Italy

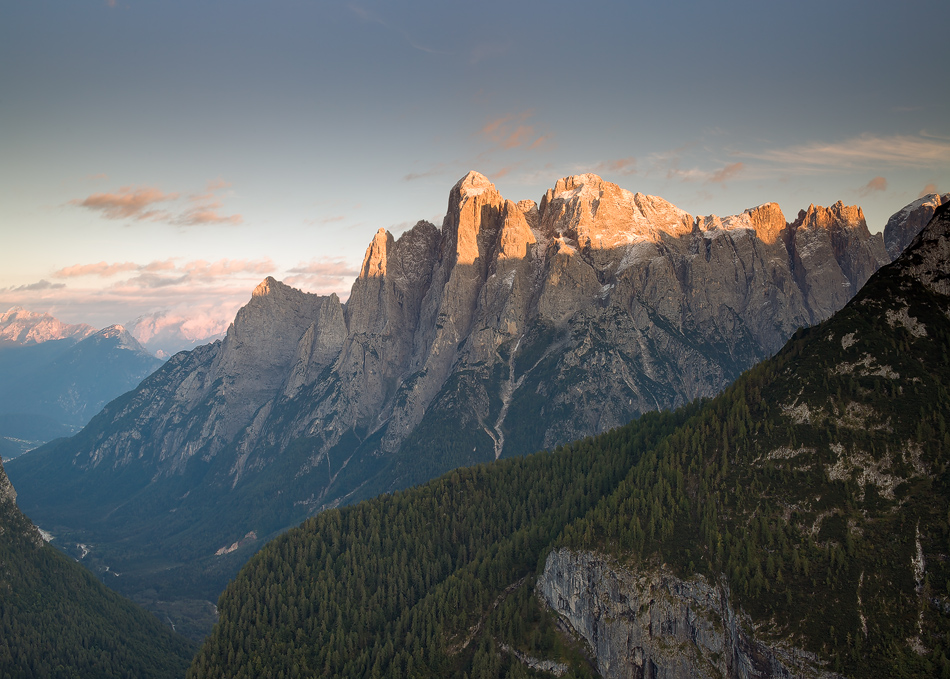
- Monte Agner (centre)

Highest point
- Elevation: 2,872 m (9,423 ft)
- Prominence: 513 m (1,683 ft)
- Coordinates: 46°16′54″N 11°56′02″E

Geography
- Location within Alps
- Location: Veneto, Italy
- Parent range: Pala group, Dolomites

Climbing
- First ascent: 1875

Monte Agnèr (2,872 m) is a mountain of the Dolomites located near the village of Taibon Agordino in Belluno, northeast Italy. It lies in the Pala group and is known locally as Il Pizzòn, meaning Great Peak. The mountain has several sub-peaks, Lastei d'Agnèr at 2,861m, Spiz d'Agnèr Sud at 2,652m, Torre Armena at 2,652m and Spiz d'Agnèr Nord at 2,545m. It was first climbed in 1875 by Cesare Tomé, accompanied by guides Tomaso Dal Col and Martino Gnech.
