= Vezzana =

Mountain in Italy

Cima di Vezzana
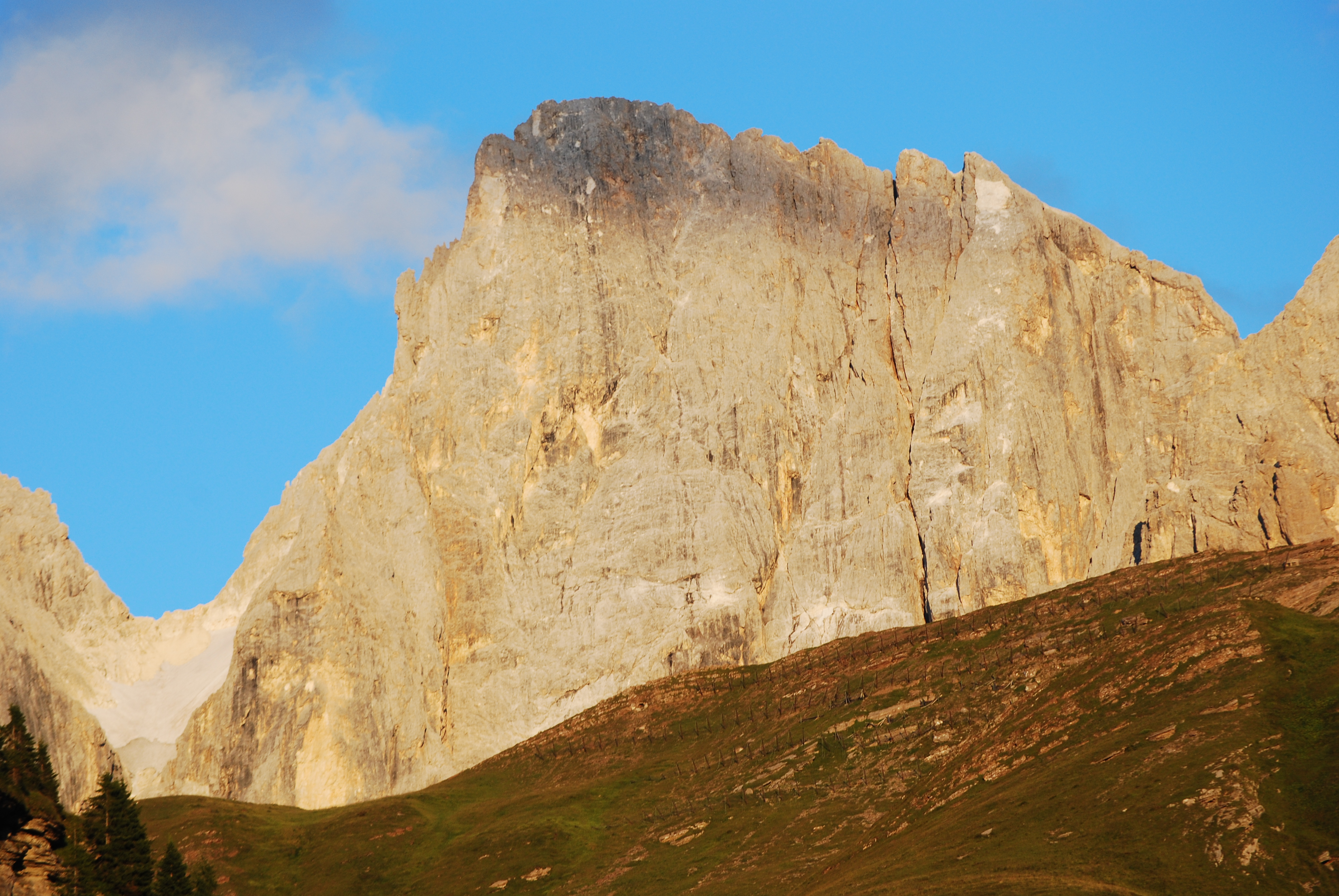
- The Vezzana from the Rolle Pass

Highest point
- Elevation: 3,192 m (10,472 ft)
- Prominence: 1,273m
- Isolation: 16.09 km (10.00 mi)
- Listing: Alpine mountains above 3000 m
- Coordinates: 46°17′23″N 11°49′47″E

Geography
- Location within Alps
- Location: Italy
- Parent range: Pala group, Dolomites

Climbing
- First ascent: 5 September 1872 by Douglas William Freshfield and Charles Comyns Tucker

The Vezzana (also Cima di Vezzana) is the highest peak in the Pala group, a mountain range of the Dolomites, northern Italy. It is located in the northern part of the Dolomites, between the Taibon Agordino and Primiero comunes of Belluno and Trentino. It has an altitude of 3,192 metres.

The peak is flanked by Cima dei Bureloni to the north and Cimon della Pala to the south. It was first ascended in 1872 by Douglas William Freshfield and Charles Comyns Tucker, who reached it from the Travignolo glacier and the Passo di Travignolo. Unusual for the time, they climbed the summit without local guides, as these had declined to go further at reaching the glacier
