= Cismon =

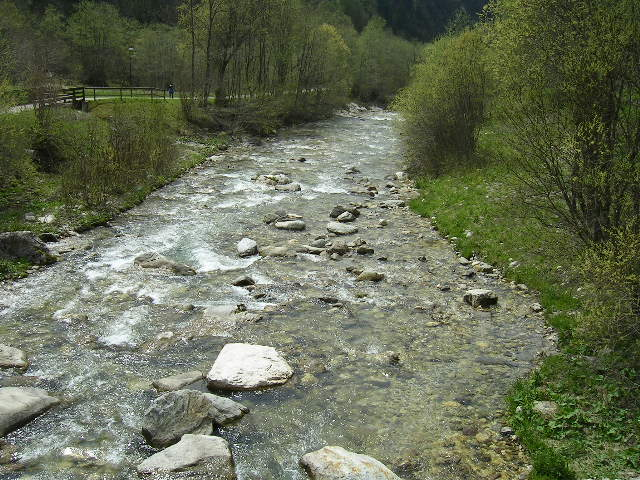

Location
- Country: Italy

Physical characteristics
- Mouth: Brenta
  - coordinates: 45.9291°N 11.7254°E
- Length: 53.2 km (33.1 mi)
- Basin size: 640 km^{2} (250 sq mi)

Basin features
- Progression: Brenta→ Adriatic Sea

The Cismon is a mountain stream (or torrent) in northern Italy, the main tributary of the Brenta River. The torrent flows from the Dolomites mountains in the Trentino-Alto Adige/Südtirol region through the plains of Venetian territory to the bigger Brenta River, which in turn flows into the Adriatic Sea in the Gulf of Venice.

The torrent drains a large basin of about 640 km^{2}. Around 70% of it is in the Autonomous Province of Trento (about 440 km^{2}) and 30% (about 200 km^{2}) in the Province of Belluno in the Veneto region.

The total length of Cismon is 53,2 km, about half of which is in the Trentino and Veneto.

== The Direction of the Cismon ==
The Cismon originates near Rolle Pass (1,984 m s.l.m / 6,509 ft), just below the Cimon della Pala mountain peak (3,184 m / 10,446 ft). Here is the highest elevation of the basin. Then, Cismon flows along the commune of Primiero and the valley of the same name and enters the Feltrino valley.

Along the way, the Cismon receives the waters of several other streams:

- Before entering the Venetian territory it receives torrent Canali from the Pale di San Martino mountains, torrent Noana from the Vette Feltrine mountains (a part of the National Park of Belluno Dolomites), and torrent Vanoi from Lagorai and Cima d’Asta mountains.
- In the Venetian territory, among the significant tributaries, there are torrent Ausor on the left upstream of the barrier of the Ponte Serra location and the Senaiga torrent, whose basin falls almost completely in the Province of Trento.

Continuing downstream, at the height of the village of Rocca d'Arsiè (hamlet of Arsiè), where the valley narrows again, a colossal dam erected in the late '50s by Enel for electro-irrigation purposes, bars the course of the Cismon retaining all the flow in conditions of low flow of the river.

The dam gives rise to the artificial Corlo Lake, whose waters continue moving through the narrow Incino Valley. The waters of the Cismon and its tributaries are exploited to power several other hydroelectric plants.

Finally, once passed the narrow gorge, the torrent flows with a tortuous path until the confluence with the Brenta River, just upstream of the town of Cismon del Grappa.

The flow rate of the Cismon is not much less than that of the Brenta, of which it can be considered the upper branch.

== The history of the Cismon basin ==
In 589 A.D., following a devastating flood, the Cismon changed its basin, passing from the Piave basin, the river into which it flowed between Artèn (hamlet of Fonzaso) and Caupo (hamlet of Seren del Grappa) through the present Stizzon stream, to that of the Brenta.

== Interesting facts about Cismon ==
The upper course of the Cismon is the only stream in Trentino that has waters in the first quality class according to the extended biotic index (IBE). It is excellent for the practice of sport fishing.

== Image Gallery ==
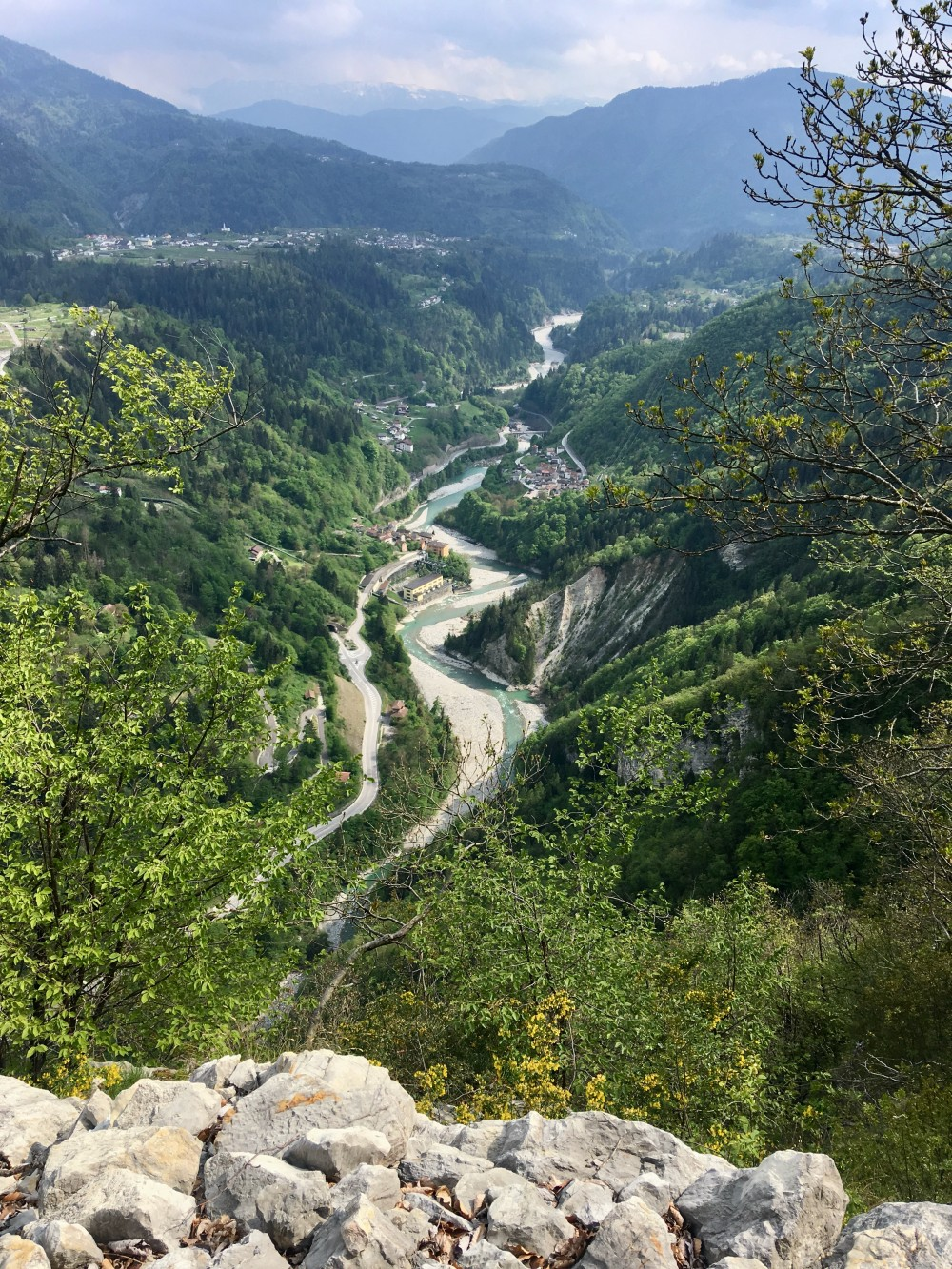
