= Fassa Valley =

Valley in the Dolomites in Trentino, northern Italy

Coordinates: 46°27′14″N 11°42′00″E

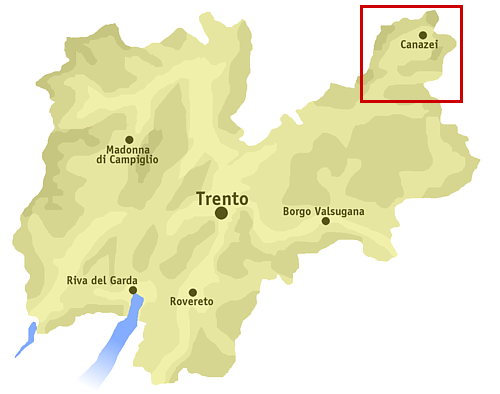
Location of the Fascia Valley (red box) in Trentino

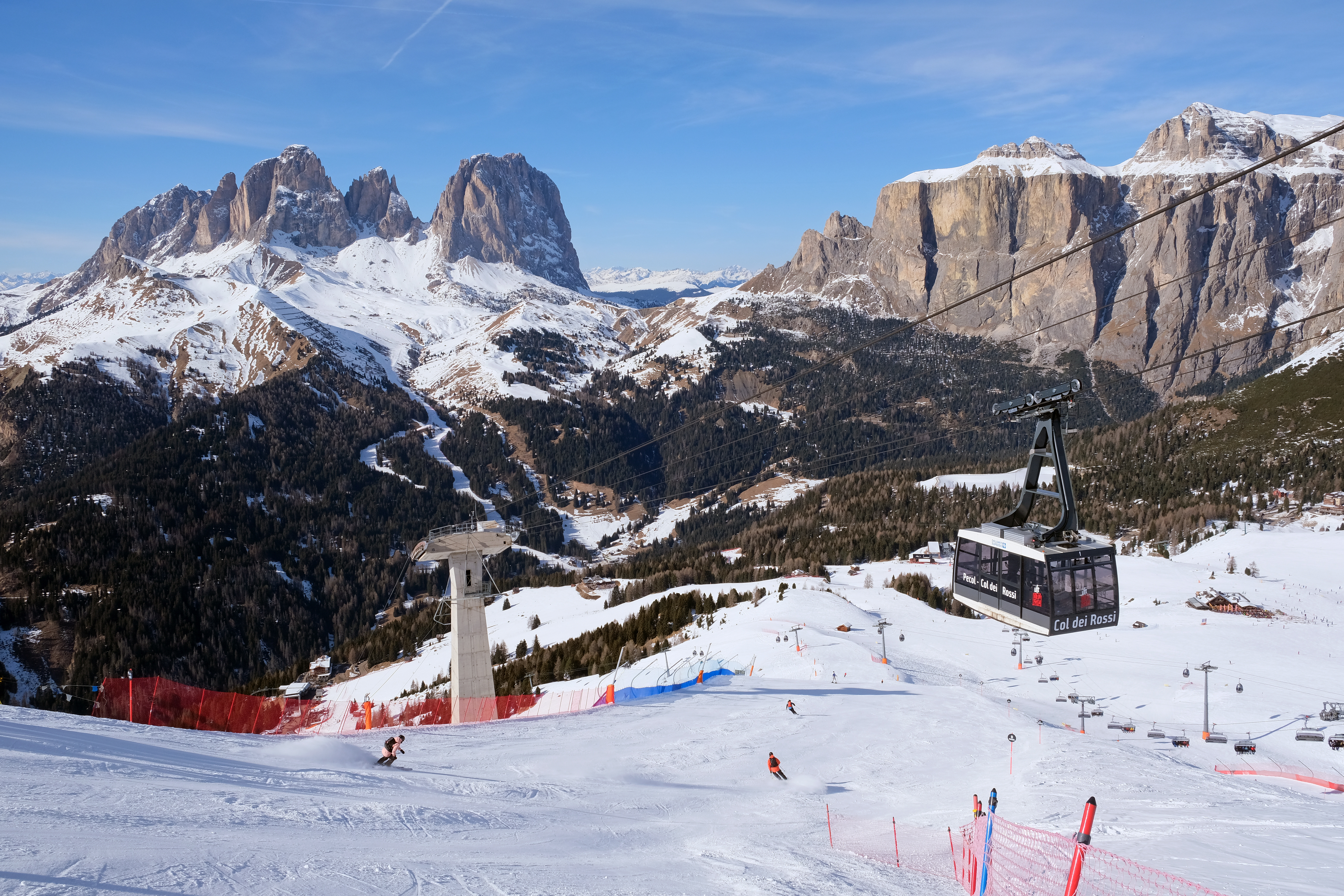
Val di Fassa ski center

The Fassa Valley (Ladin: Fascia, Italian: Val di Fassa, German: Fassatal) is a valley in the Dolomites in Trentino, northern Italy. The valley composes an administrative valley community (Italian: Comunità di valle, German: Talgemeinschaft) of Trentino, known as Fascia (Ladin: Region Comun General de Fascia).

The valley is home to much of the Ladin community in Trentino, which makes up the majority of the valley's population.

== Municipalities ==
The municipalities in the valley include (Ladin name):

- Canazei (Cianacei)
- Campitello di Fassa (Ciampedel)
- Mazzin (Mazin)
- San Giovanni di Fassa (Sen Jan)
  - Frazioni: Pozza di Fassa, Vigo di Fassa, Pera di Fassa
- Soraga di Fassa (Soraga)
- Moena (Moena)
