= Pozza di Fassa =

- Frazione
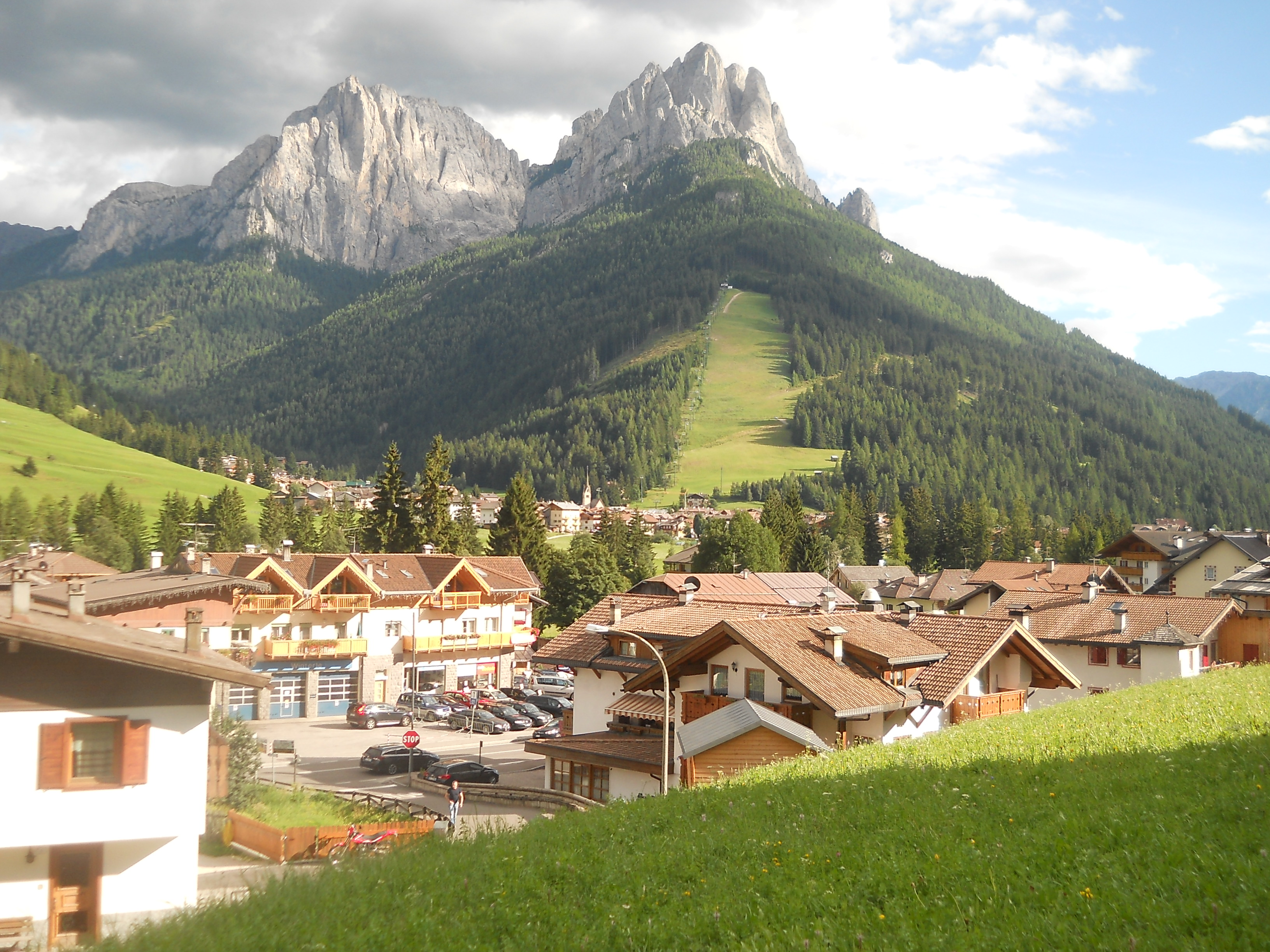

- Location of Pozza di Fassa in Italy Pozza di Fassa (Italy)
- Coordinates: 46°26′N 11°41′E
- Country: Italy
- Region: Trentino-Alto Adige/Südtirol
- Province: Trentino (TN)
- Comune: Sèn Jan di Fassa

Area
  - Total: 73.2 km^{2} (28.3 sq mi)
- Elevation: 1,325 m (4,347 ft)

Population (Dec. 2004)
  - Total: 1,867
  - Density: 25.5/km^{2} (66.1/sq mi)
- Time zone: UTC+1 (CET)
  - Summer (DST): UTC+2 (CEST)
- Postal code: 38036
- Dialing code: 0462

Pozza di Fassa (Ladin: Poza (de Fascia), German: Potzach im Fasstal) is a frazione of Sèn Jan di Fassa in Trentino in the northern Italian region Trentino-Alto Adige/Südtirol, located about 60 kilometres (37 mi) northeast of Trento. As of 31 December 2004, it had a population of 1,867 and an area of 73.2 square kilometres (28.3 mi^{2}).

The frazione of Pozza di Fassa contains the frazioni (subdivisions, mainly villages and hamlets) Pera di Fassa and Monzon.

Pozza di Fassa borders the following municipalities: Canazei, Tiers, Mazzin, Welschnofen, Rocca Pietore, Vigo di Fassa, Moena and Soraga.

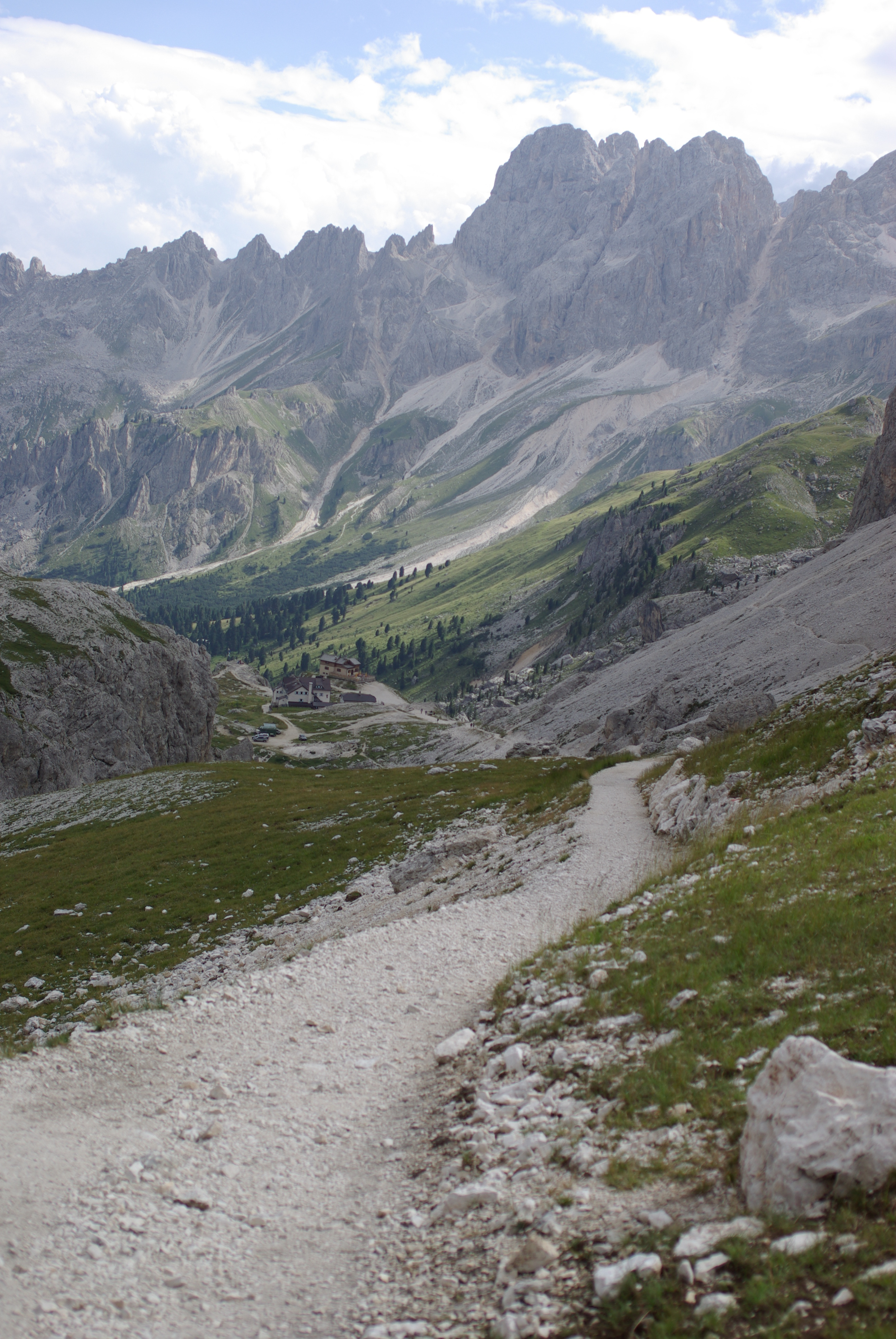

In the census of 2001, 1,587 inhabitants out of 1,787 (88.8%) declared Ladin as their native language.

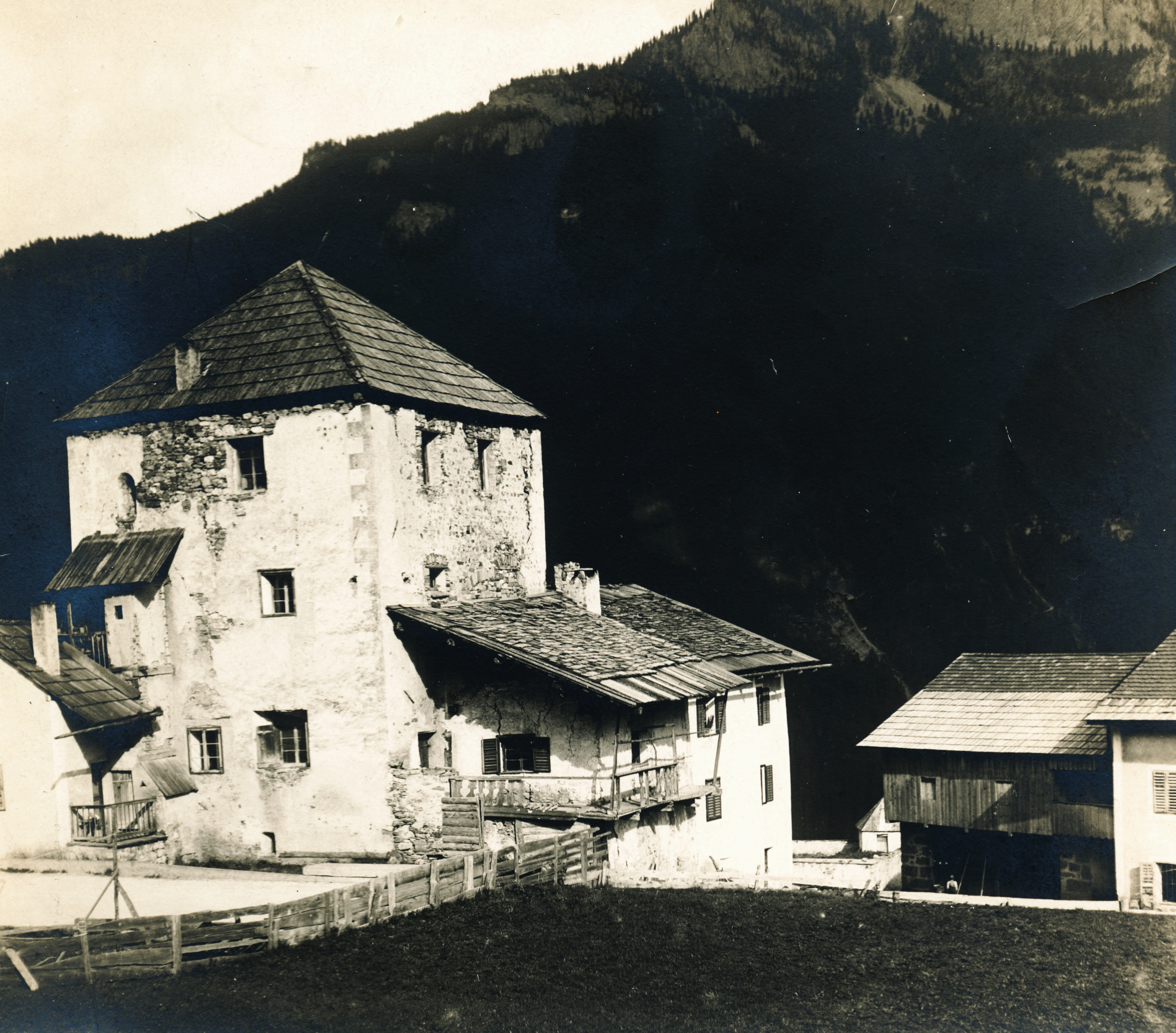
The castle

== Demographic evolution ==
Historical population

Year	Pop.	±%
1861	?	—
1871	?	—
1881	?	—
1901	?	—
1911	?	—

Year	Pop.	±%
1921	1,155	—
1931	1,092	−5.5%
1936	1,082	−0.9%
1951	1,244	+15.0%
1961	1,250	+0.5%

Year	Pop.	±%
1971	1,426	+14.1%
1981	1,621	+13.7%
1991	1,668	+2.9%
2001	1,787	+7.1%

Source: Data from ISTAT
