= Pera (San Giovanni di Fassa) =

- Frazione
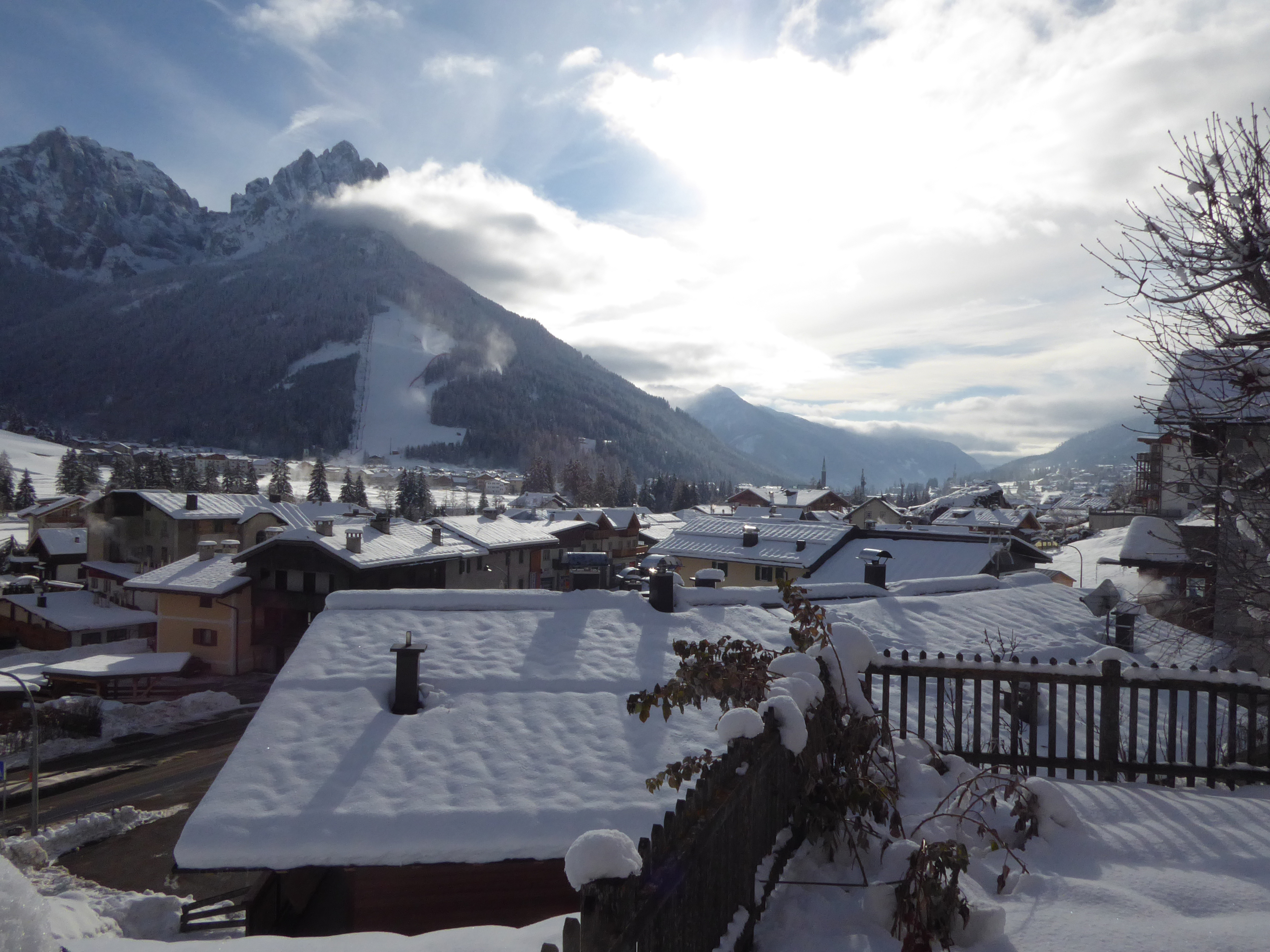

- Location of Pera in Italy Pera (Italy)
- Country: Italy
- Region: Trentino-Alto Adige/Südtirol
- Province: Trentino (TN)
- Comune: San Giovanni di Fassa
- Elevation: 1,326 m (4,350 ft)

Population (9 October 2011)
  - Total: 504
- Time zone: UTC+1 (CET)
  - Summer (DST): UTC+2 (CEST)
- Postal code: 38039
- Dialing code: 0462

Pera (known also as Pera di Fassa) is a frazione of 504 inhabitants in the municipality of San Giovanni di Fassa in the autonomous province of Trento, northern Italy.

The hamlet is situated in the val di Fassa.

== History ==
Pera was an Italian comune founded in 1920 following the annexation of the Tridentine Venice to the Kingdom of Italy.

In 1926 it was aggregated to the municipality of Pozza di Fassa, that in 2018 merged with Vigo di Fassa in the new municipality of San Giovanni di Fassa, following a successful referendum on 20 November 2017.
