= Armando Aste =

Italian mountain climber (1926-2017)

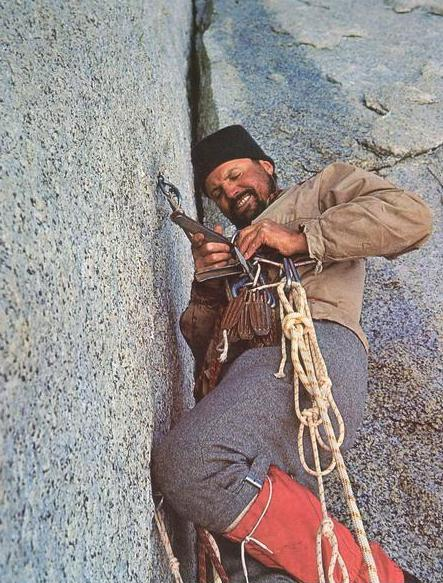

Personal information
- Nationality: Italian
- Born: 6 January 1926 Rovereto
- Died: 1 September 2017 (aged 91) Rovereto

Climbing career
- Major ascents: South Tower of Paine
- Named routes: Aste-Susatti route, Monte Civetta

Armando Aste (6 January 1926 – 1 September 2017) was one of the most influential Italian alpinists of the postwar period.

Aste was born in Rovereto near Trento, Trentino. He led the first Italian ascent of the Eiger north face in 1962, together with Pierlorenzo Acquistapace, Gildo Airoldi, Andrea Mellano, Romano Perego and Franco Solina.

He also climbed for the first time the South Tower of Paine in Patagonia, one of the three Torres del Paine. Due to his numerous ascents in the Italian Dolomites, climbing routes have been named after him (e.g. the Aste-Susatti route in the Monte Civetta, near Belluno, Italy, first ascent by Armando Aste and Fausto Susatti on 26–28 July 1954).

Further selected first ascents in the Dolomites by Armando Aste were:

- Cima del Focobon, together with Franco Solina, 16–19 August 1958;
- Piz Seranto south face, with Franco Solina, 10–15 August 1959;
- Crozzon di Brenta, with Milo Navasa, 26–28 August 1959;
- Marmolada d'Ombretta, with Franco Solina, 24–29 August 1964. Reinhold Messner was the first person who climbed this route again, which is called today the "Aste route" or "Via dell'Ideale". Jerzy Kukuczka was the first to dare the ascent at the end of winter (17–23 March 1973).

His most important books are Pilastri del Cielo (Nordpress, Italy, 2000) and Cuore di Roccia (Manfrini Stampatori, Italy, 1988).
