= Monte Mulaz =

Mountain in Italy

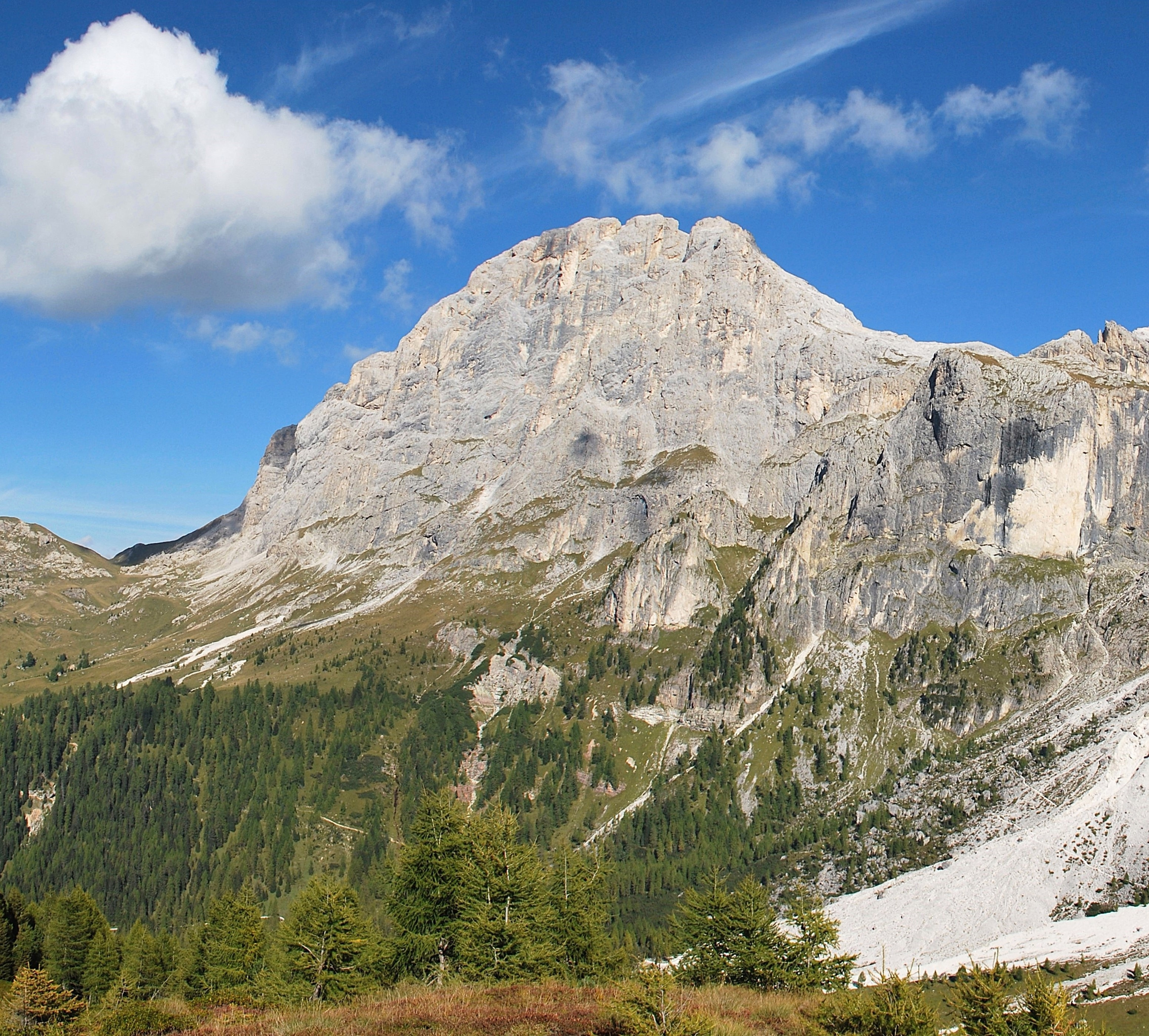
- Southwest aspect

Highest point
- Elevation: 2,906 m (9,534 ft)
- Prominence: 293 m (961 ft)
- Parent peak: Vezzana
- Isolation: 1.18 km (0.73 mi)
- Coordinates: 46°18′56″N 11°49′58″E

Geography
- Location within Italy
- Country: Italy
- Province: Trentino / Belluno
- Protected area: Paneveggio-Pale di San Martino Natural Park
- Parent range: Dolomites; Pale di San Martino
- Topo map: Tabacco Map 022 Pale di San Martino

Geology
- Rock age: Triassic
- Rock type: Dolomite

Monte Mulaz is a mountain on the common boundary shared by the provinces of Trentino and Belluno in northern Italy.

== Description ==
Monte Mulaz is a 2,906-meter-elevation (9,534-foot) summit in the Pale di San Martino group of the Dolomites. The peak is located five kilometers (3.1 miles) southwest of Falcade, and the peak is the tenth-highest within Paneveggio-Pale di San Martino Natural Park, a UNESCO World Heritage Site. Precipitation runoff from the mountain's west slope drains into Torrente Travignolo which is a tributary of the Avisio, whereas the east slope drains into tributaries of the Piave. Topographic relief is significant as the summit rises approximately 1,050 meters (3,445 feet) above the Focobon Valley in 1.6 kilometers (1 mile), and 1,100 meters (3,609 feet) above the Travignolo Valley in 1.5 kilometers (0.93 mile). The nearest higher neighbor is Cima del Focobon, 1.26 kilometers (0.78 mile) to the southeast.

== Climate ==
Based on the Köppen climate classification, Monte Mulaz is located in an alpine climate zone with long, cold winters, and short, mild summers. Weather systems are forced upward by the mountains (orographic lift), causing moisture to drop in the form of rain and snow. The months of June through September offer the most favorable weather for visiting or climbing in this area.

== Gallery ==
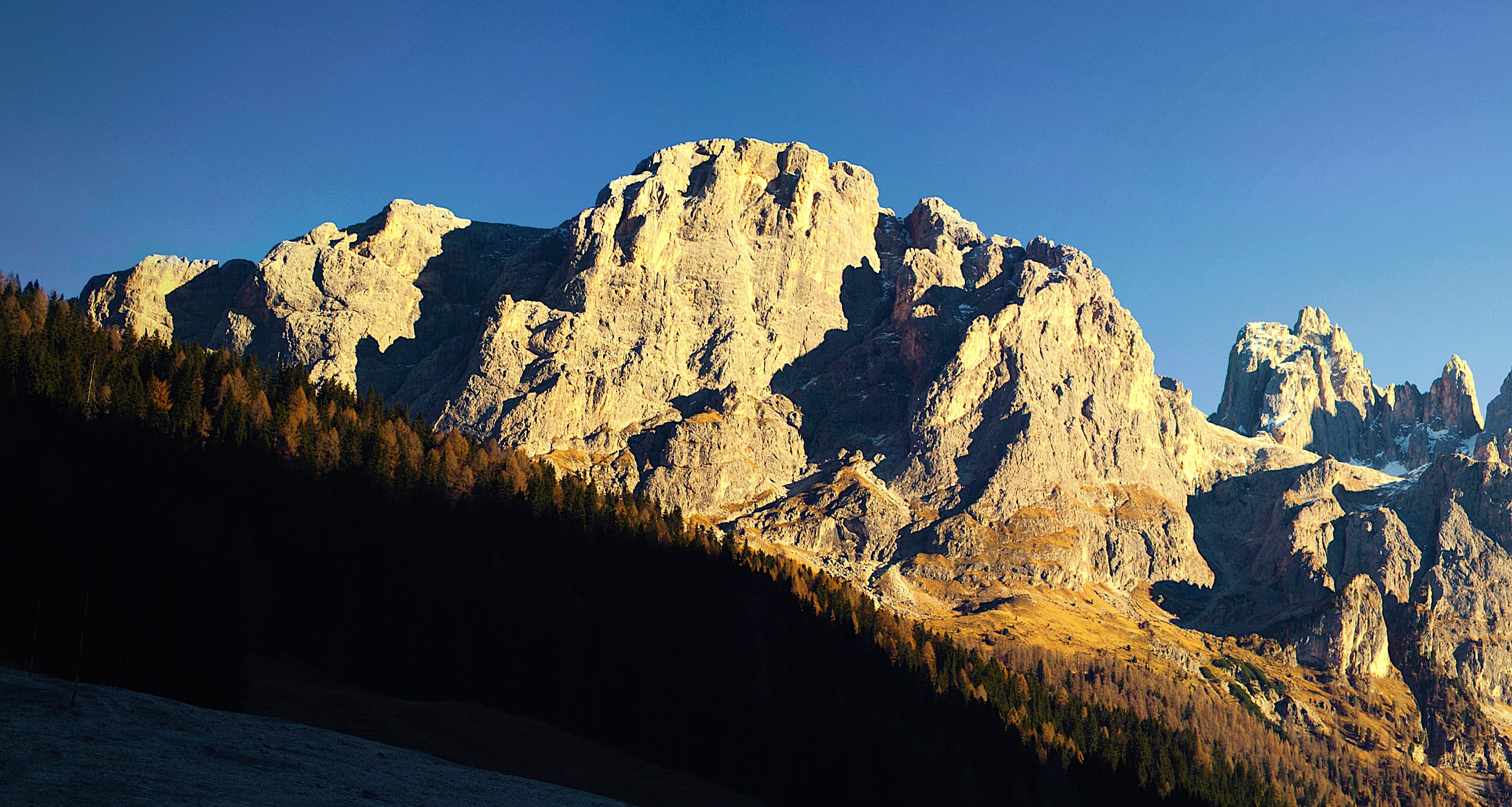
West aspect at sunset

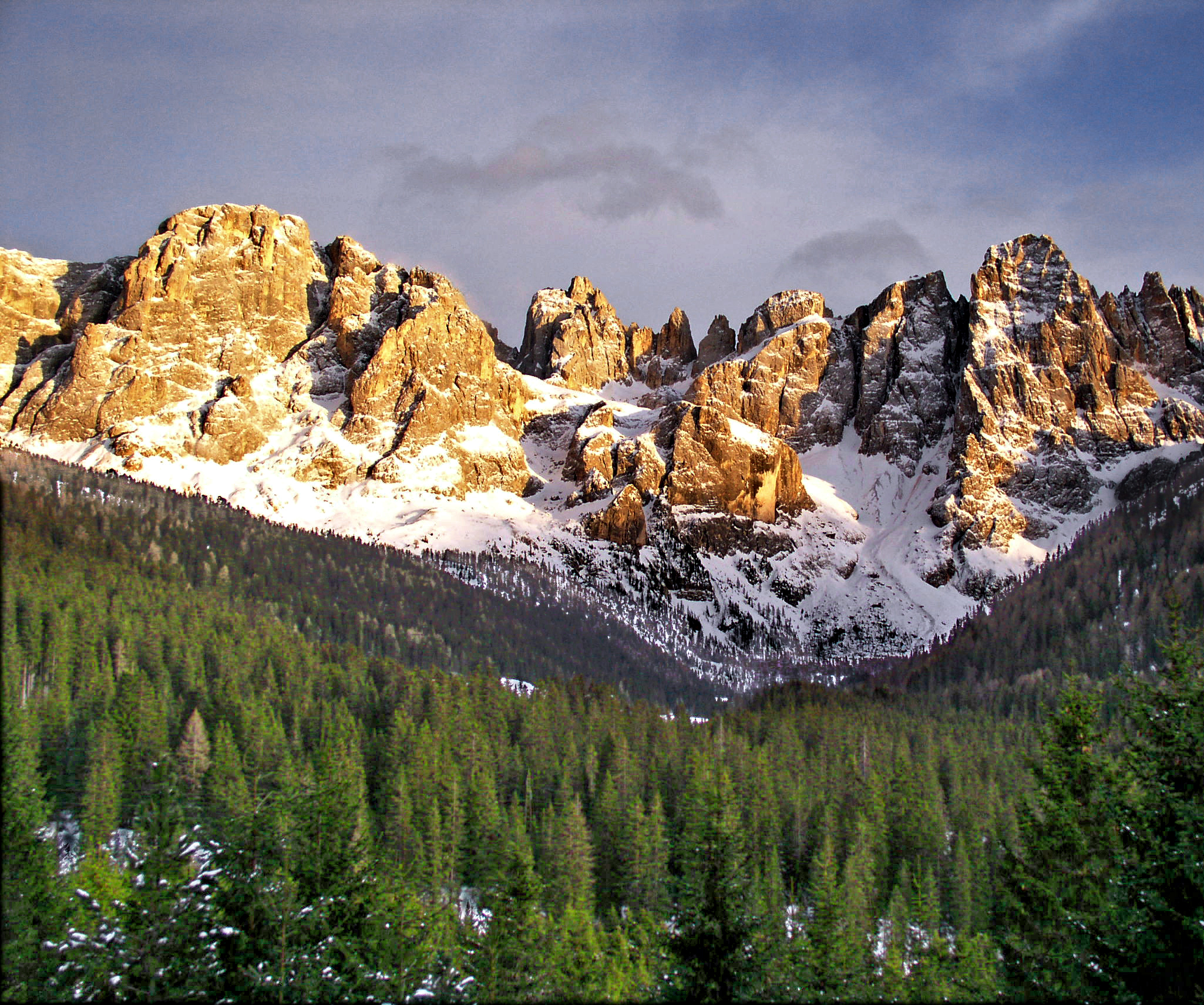
Mulaz (left), Focobon, and Bureloni

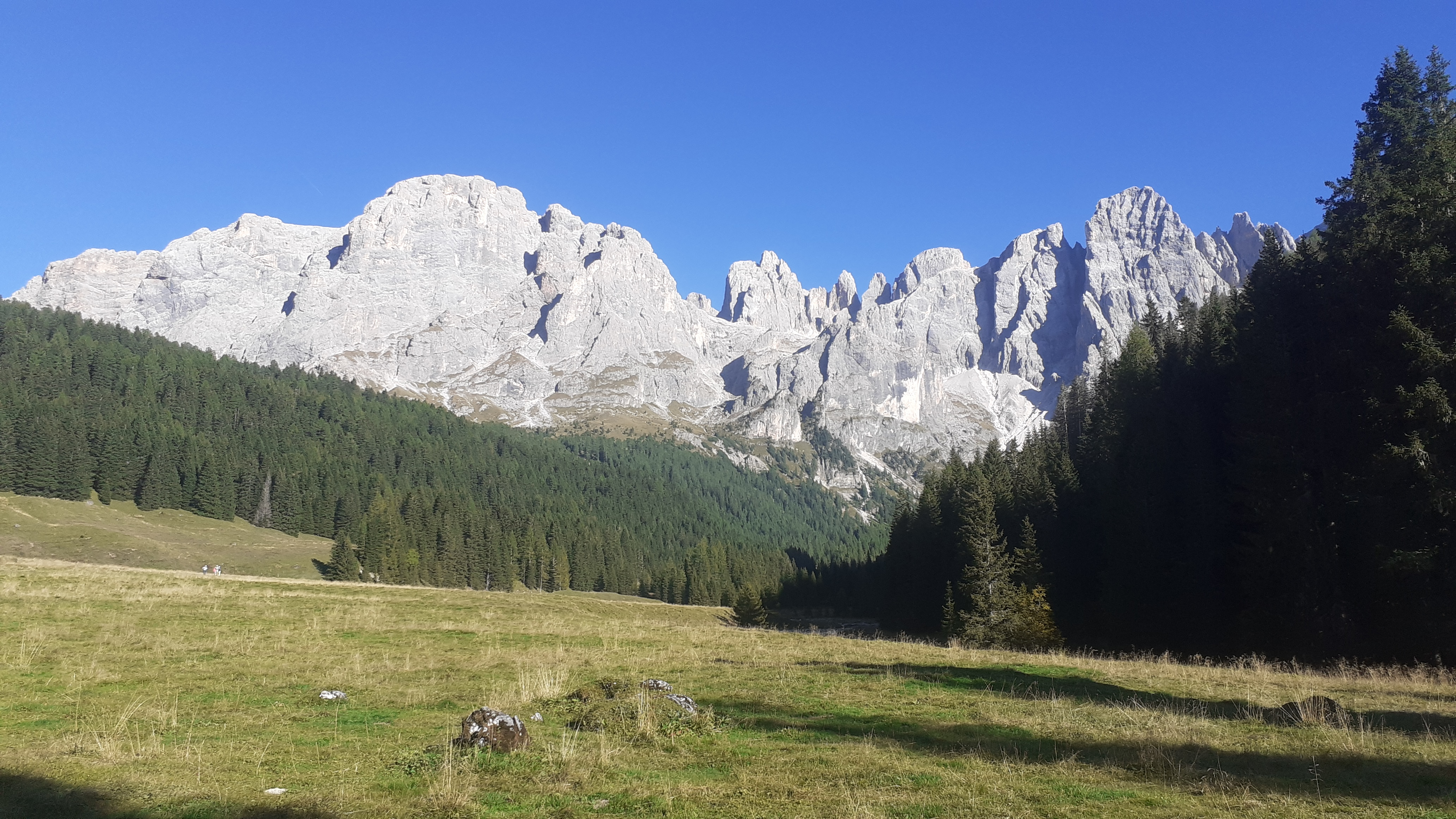
Mulaz (left) with Cima dei Bureloni (right)

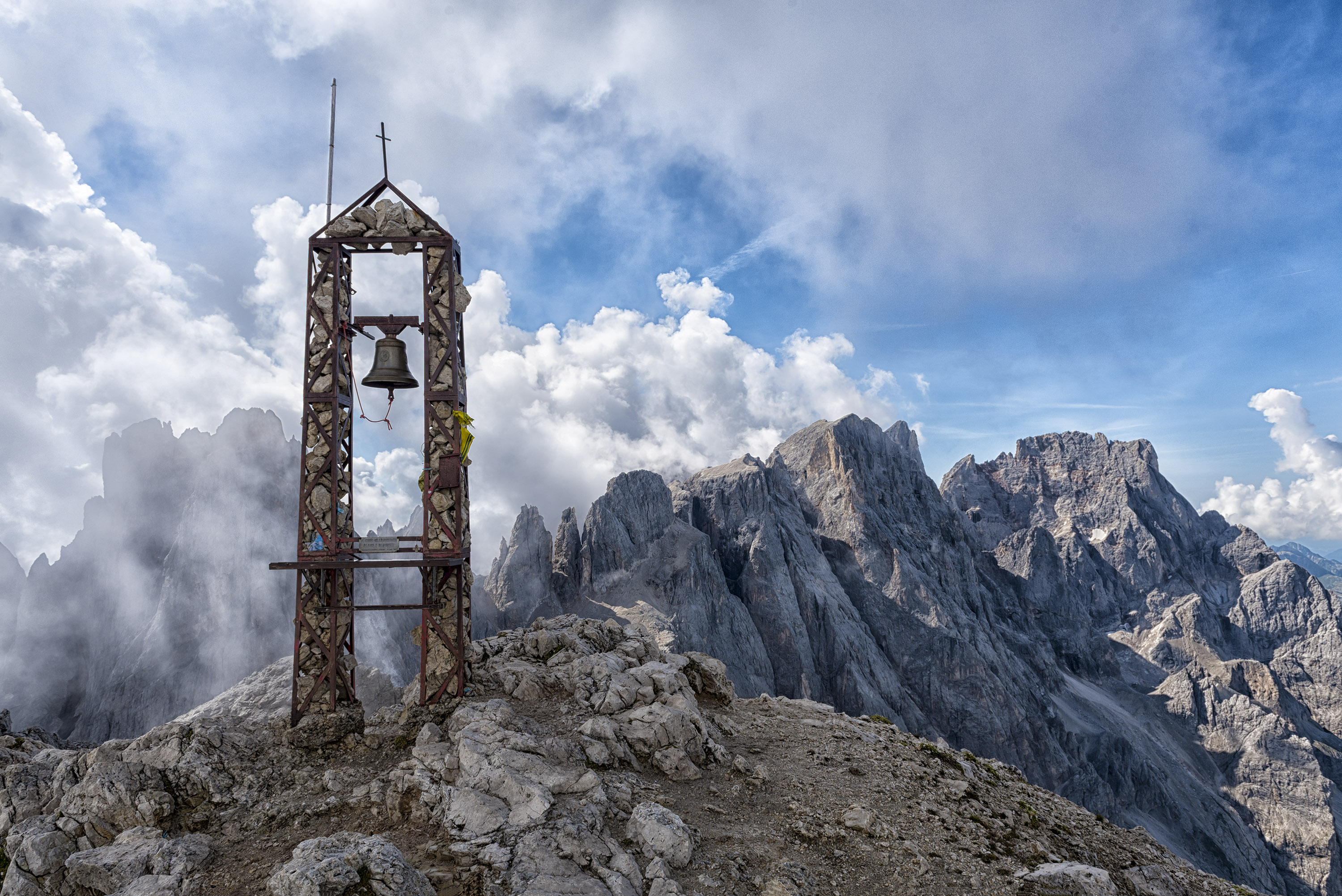
Summit of Mulaz

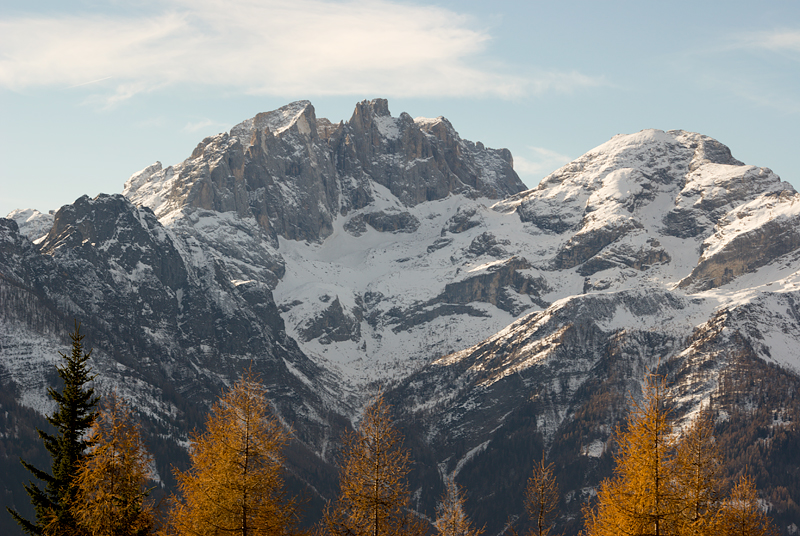
Focobon Group (left) and Mulaz (right) from north

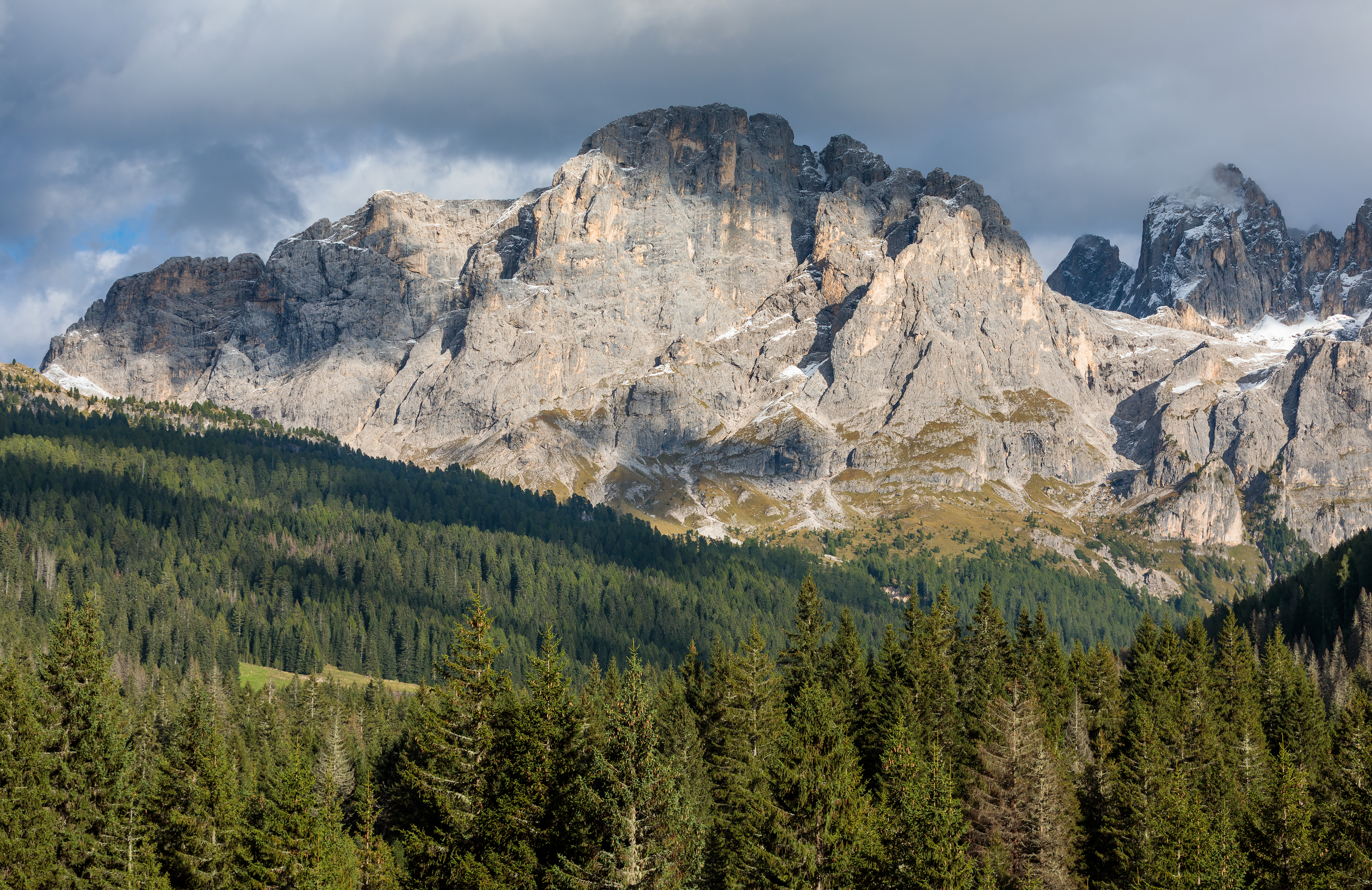
West aspect

== See also ==
- Southern Limestone Alps
