= Cima del Focobon =

Mountain in Italy

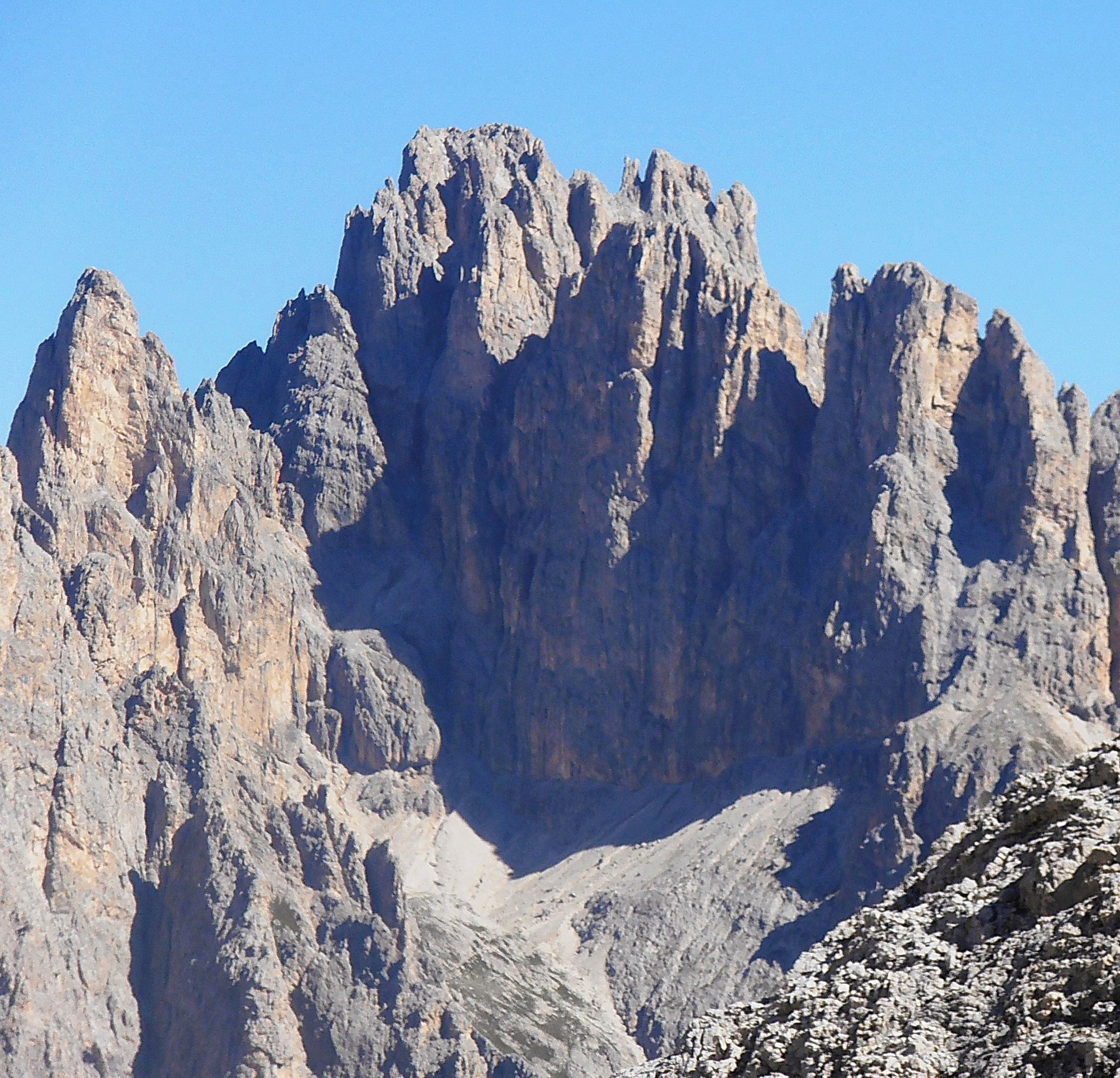
- South aspect

Highest point
- Elevation: 3,054 m (10,020 ft)
- Prominence: 250 m (820 ft)
- Parent peak: Vezzana
- Isolation: 1.154 km (0.717 mi)
- Coordinates: 46°18′23″N 11°50′32″E

Geography
- Location within Italy
- Country: Italy
- Province: Trentino / Belluno
- Protected area: Paneveggio-Pale di San Martino Natural Park
- Parent range: Dolomites; Pale di San Martino
- Topo map: Tabacco Maps Pale di San Martino

Geology
- Rock age: Triassic
- Rock type: Dolomite

Cima del Focobon, also spelled Cima di Focobon, is a mountain on the common boundary shared by the provinces of Trentino and Belluno in northern Italy.

== Description ==
Cima del Focobon is a 3,054-meter-elevation (10,020-foot) summit in the Pale di San Martino group of the Dolomites. The peak is located five kilometers (3.1 miles) northeast of San Martino di Castrozza mountain resort, and the peak is in Paneveggio-Pale di San Martino Natural Park, a UNESCO World Heritage Site. The peak is the highest peak of the Focobon Group, and along with Cima di Campido and Campanili dei Lastéi, forms the "Trinity of Focobon", as seen from the village of Falcade. The mountain's toponym may derive from Ladin language related to "buon" (good) and "fuoco" (fire), possibly descriptive of its fiery appearance at sunset. Precipitation runoff from the mountain's west slope drains into Torrente Travignolo which is a tributary of the Avisio, whereas all other slopes drain into tributaries of the Piave. Topographic relief is significant as the summit rises approximately 1,200 meters (3,937 feet) above Torrente Travignolo in two kilometers (1.24 miles), and 1,240 meters (4,068 feet) above the Comelle Valley in two kilometers. The first ascent of the north ridge was made in 1962 by Dino Fontanive and Paolo Fauri. The nearest higher neighbor is Cima delle Zirocole, 1.154 kilometers (0.72 mile) to the south.

== Climate ==
Based on the Köppen climate classification, Cima del Focobon is located in an alpine climate zone with long, cold winters, and short, mild summers. Weather systems are forced upward by the mountains (orographic lift), causing moisture to drop in the form of rain and snow. The months of June through September offer the most favorable weather for visiting or climbing in this area.

== Gallery ==
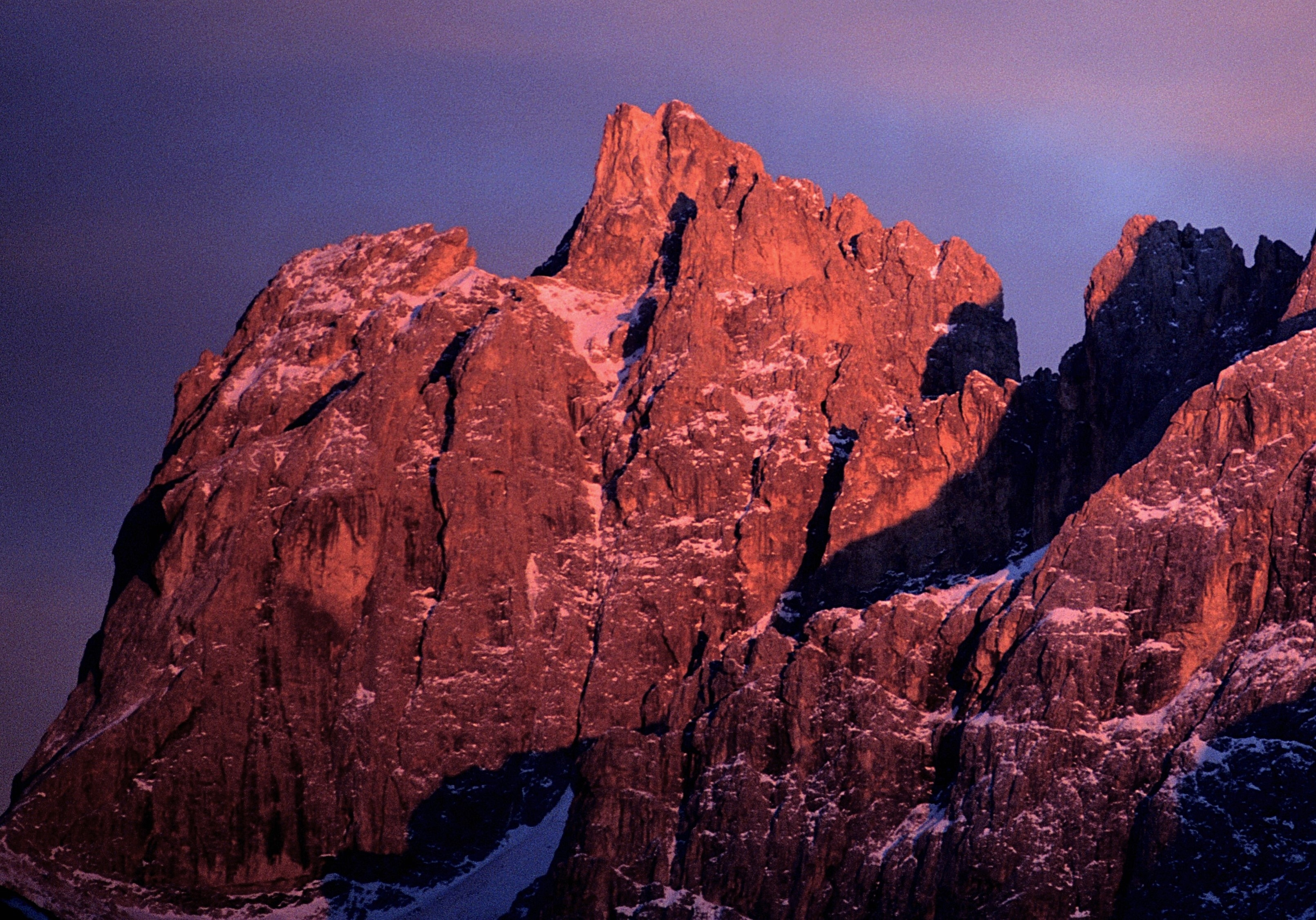
West aspect at sunset

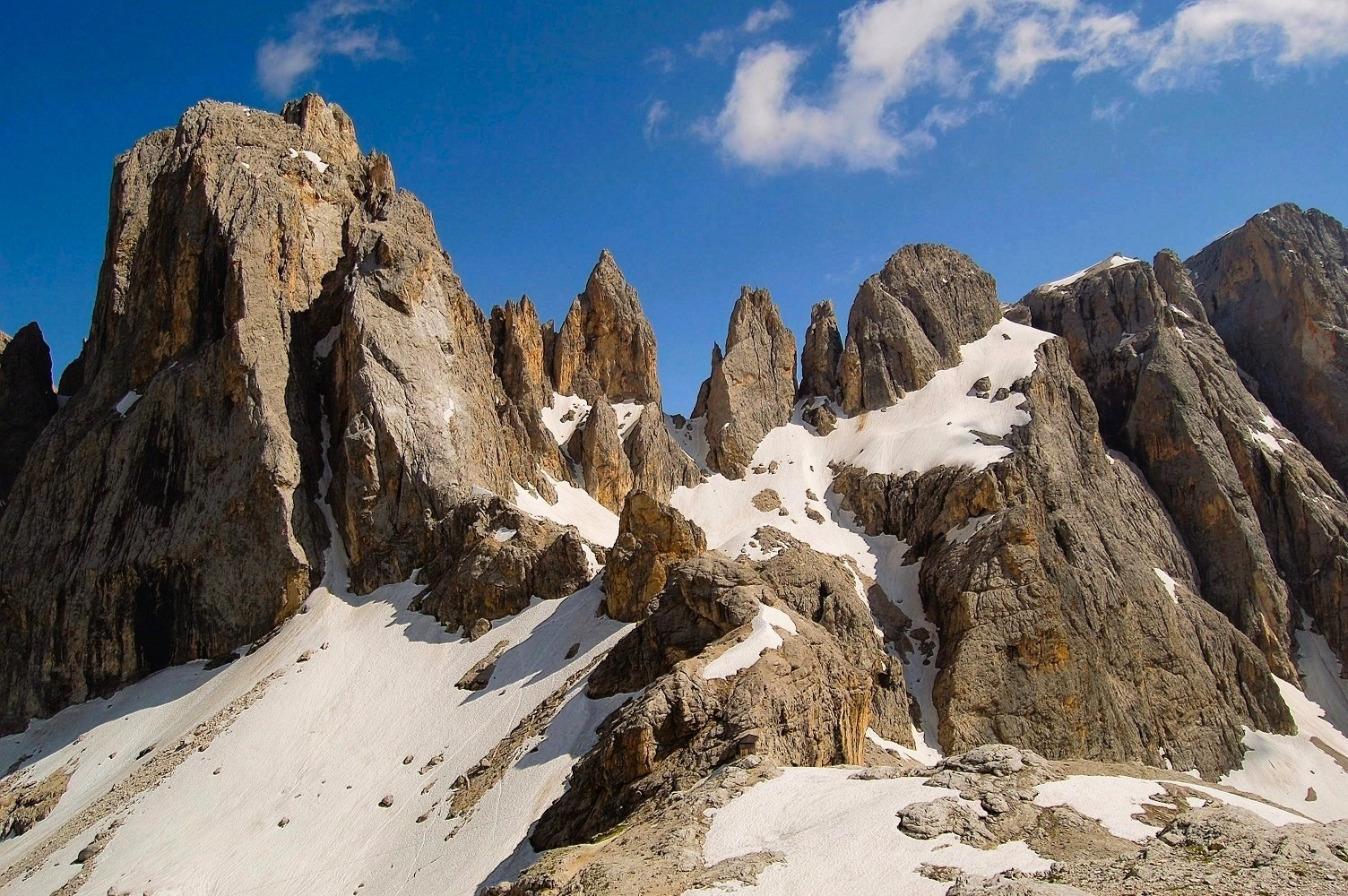
Cima del Focobon to the left

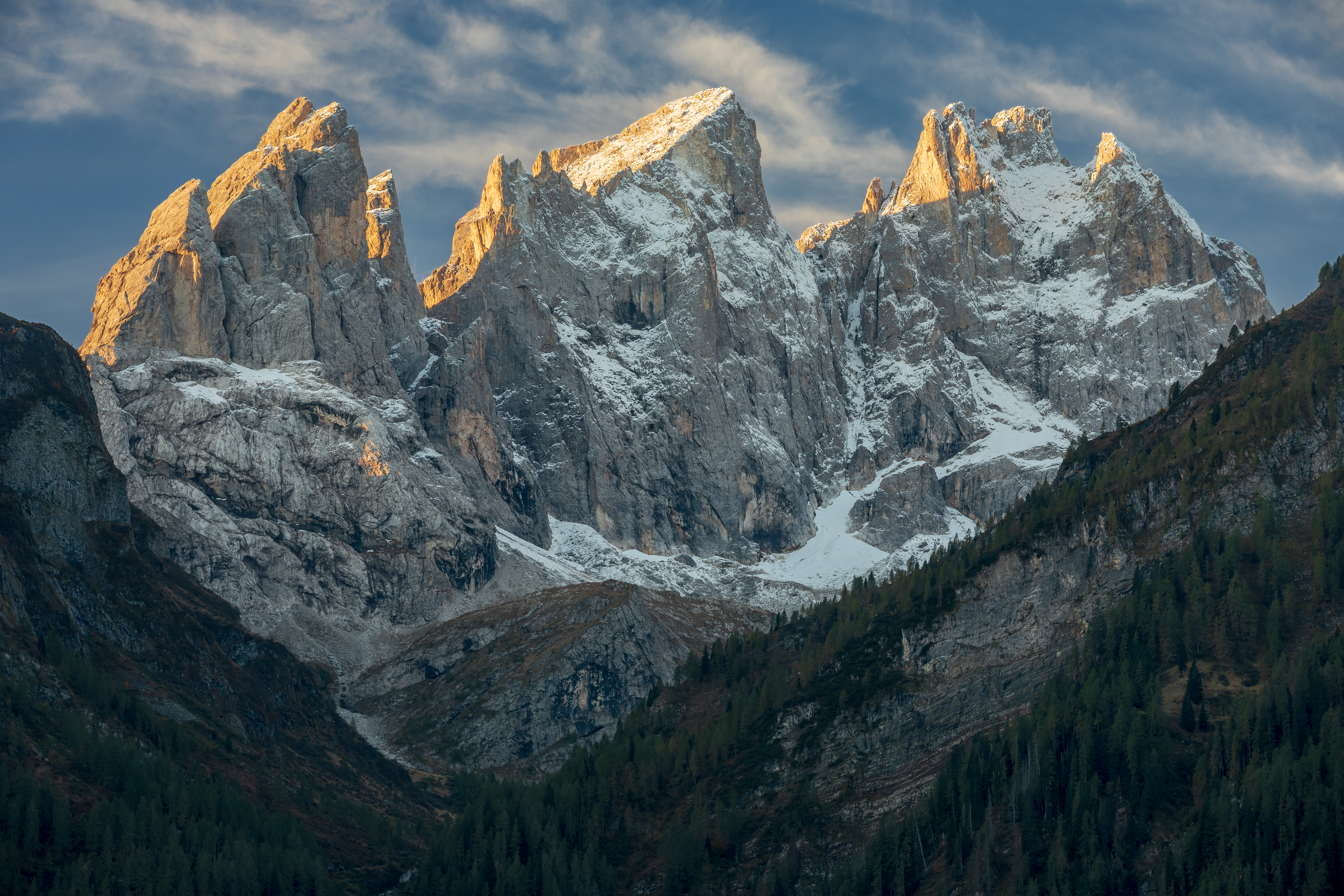
Focobon Group from north
L→R Campanili dei Lastéi, Cima di Campido, Cima del Focobon

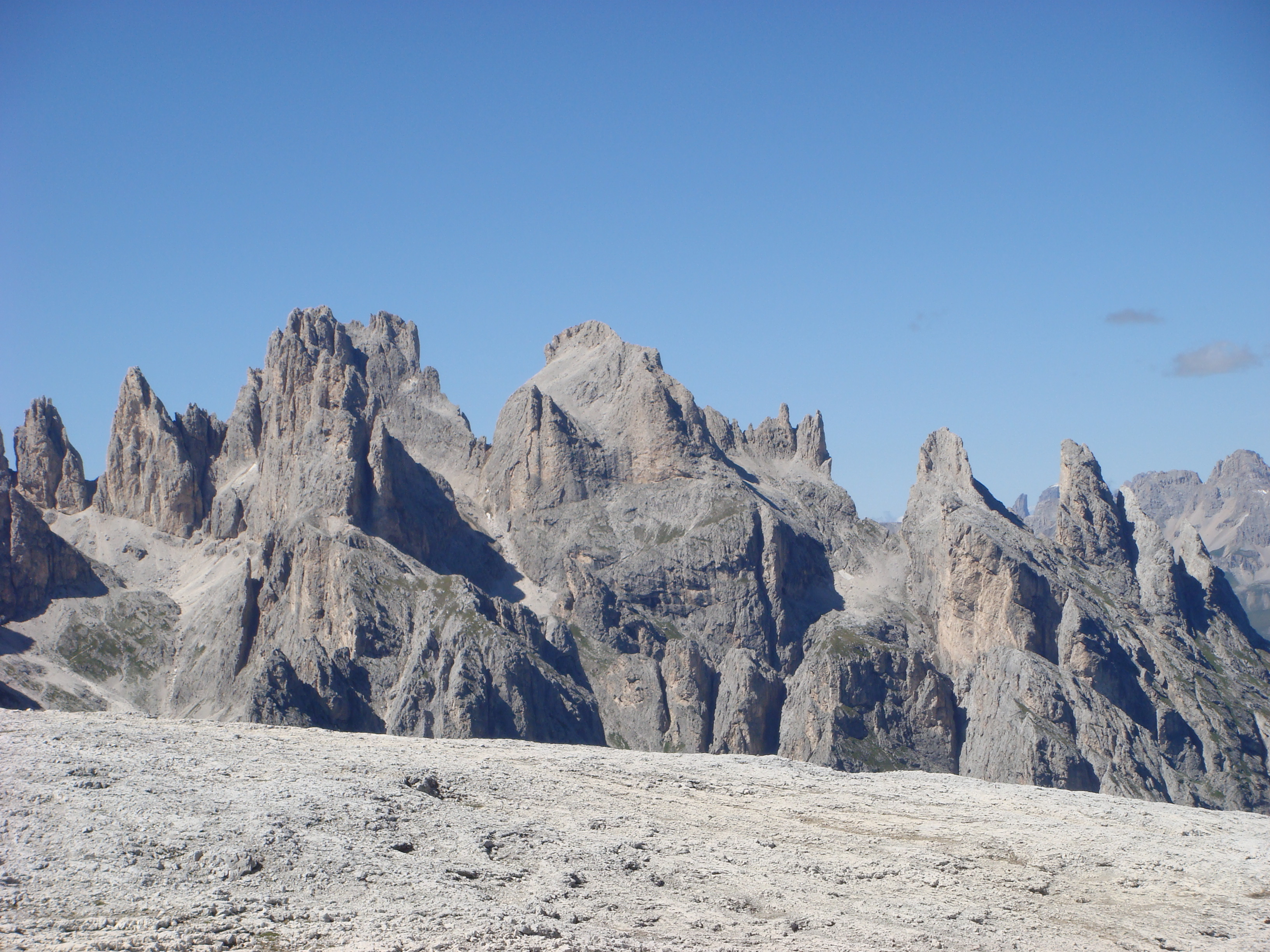
Cima del Focobon (left) from south

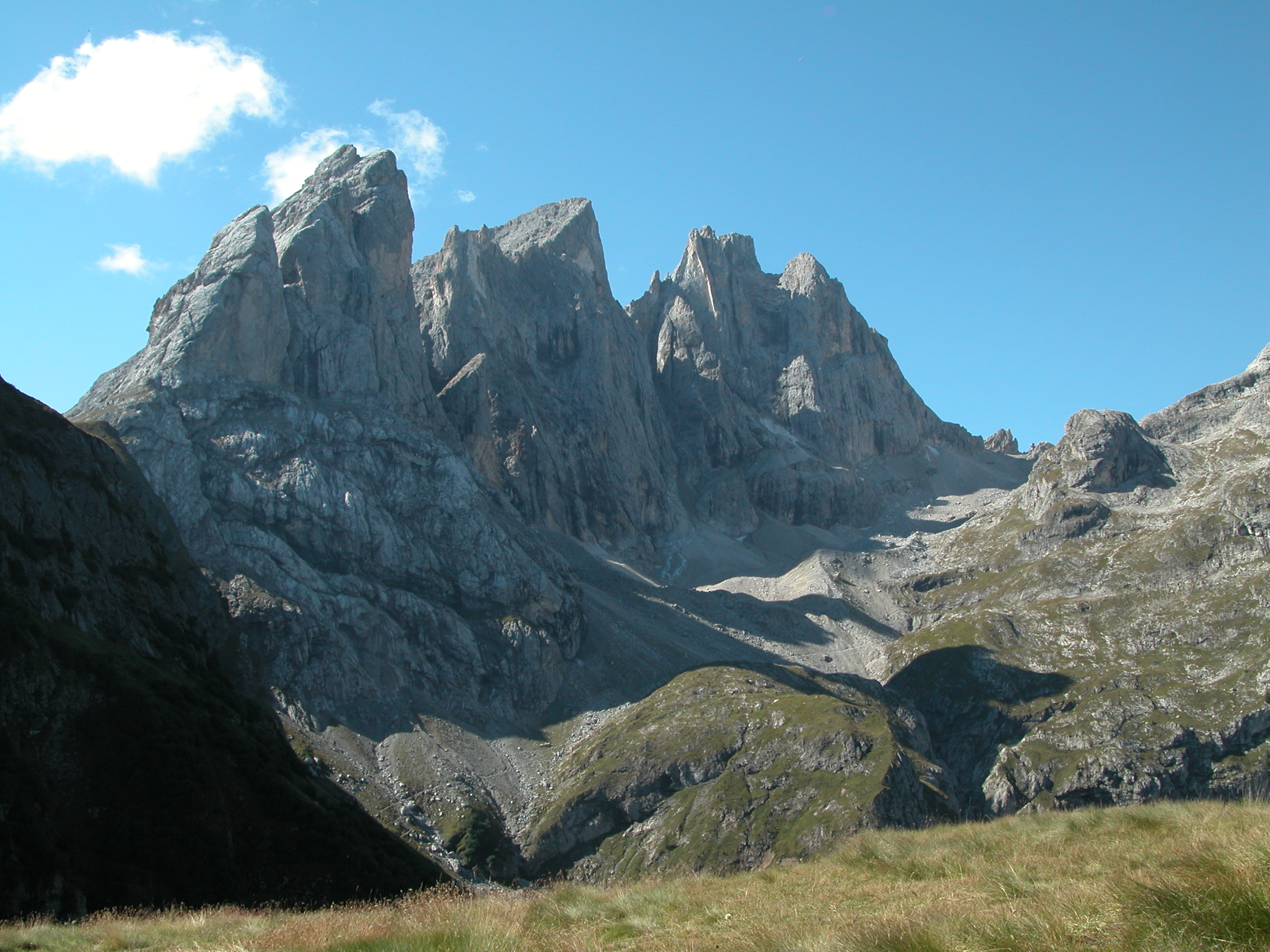
Trinity of Focobon

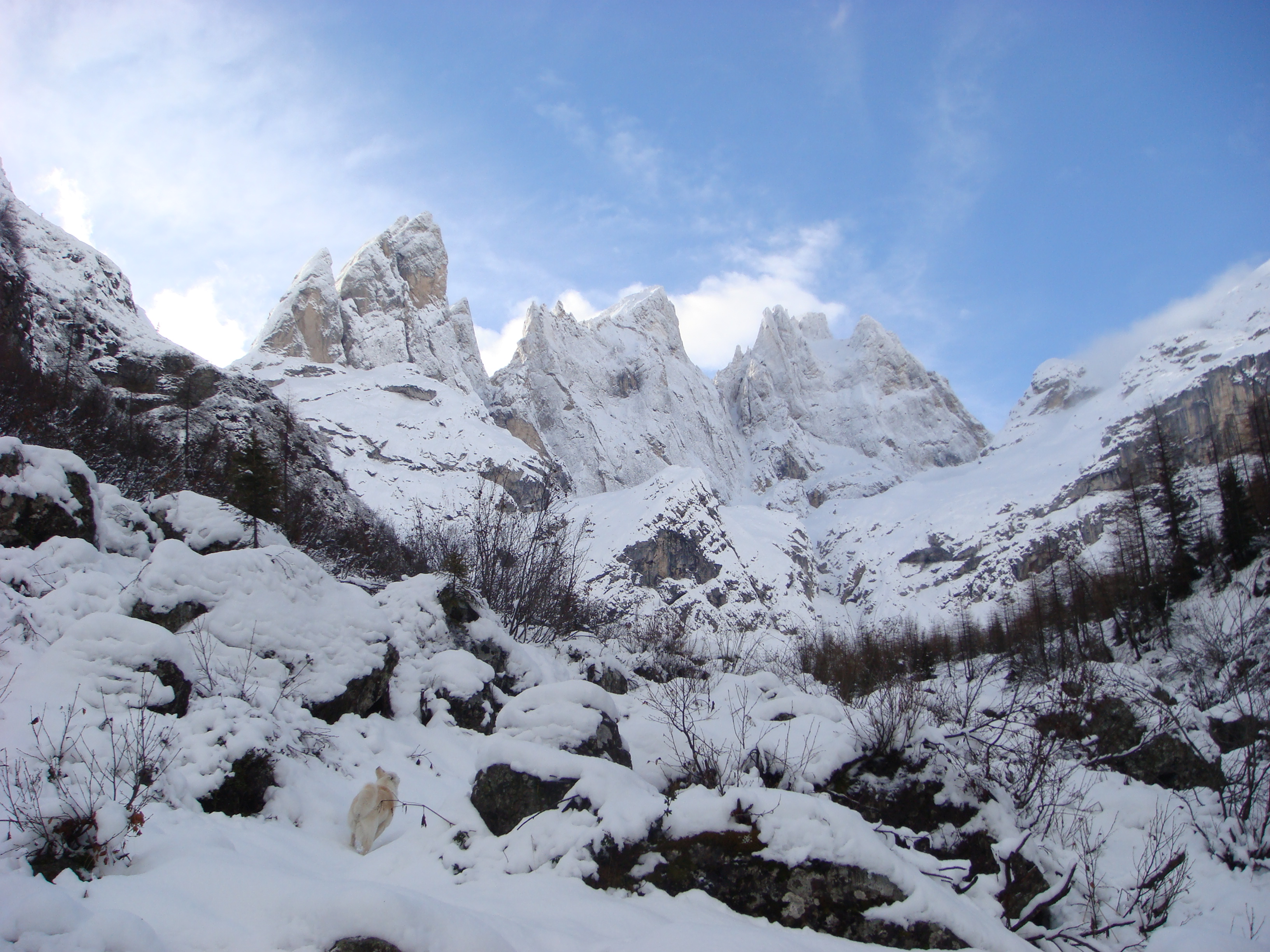
Trinity of Focobon from north

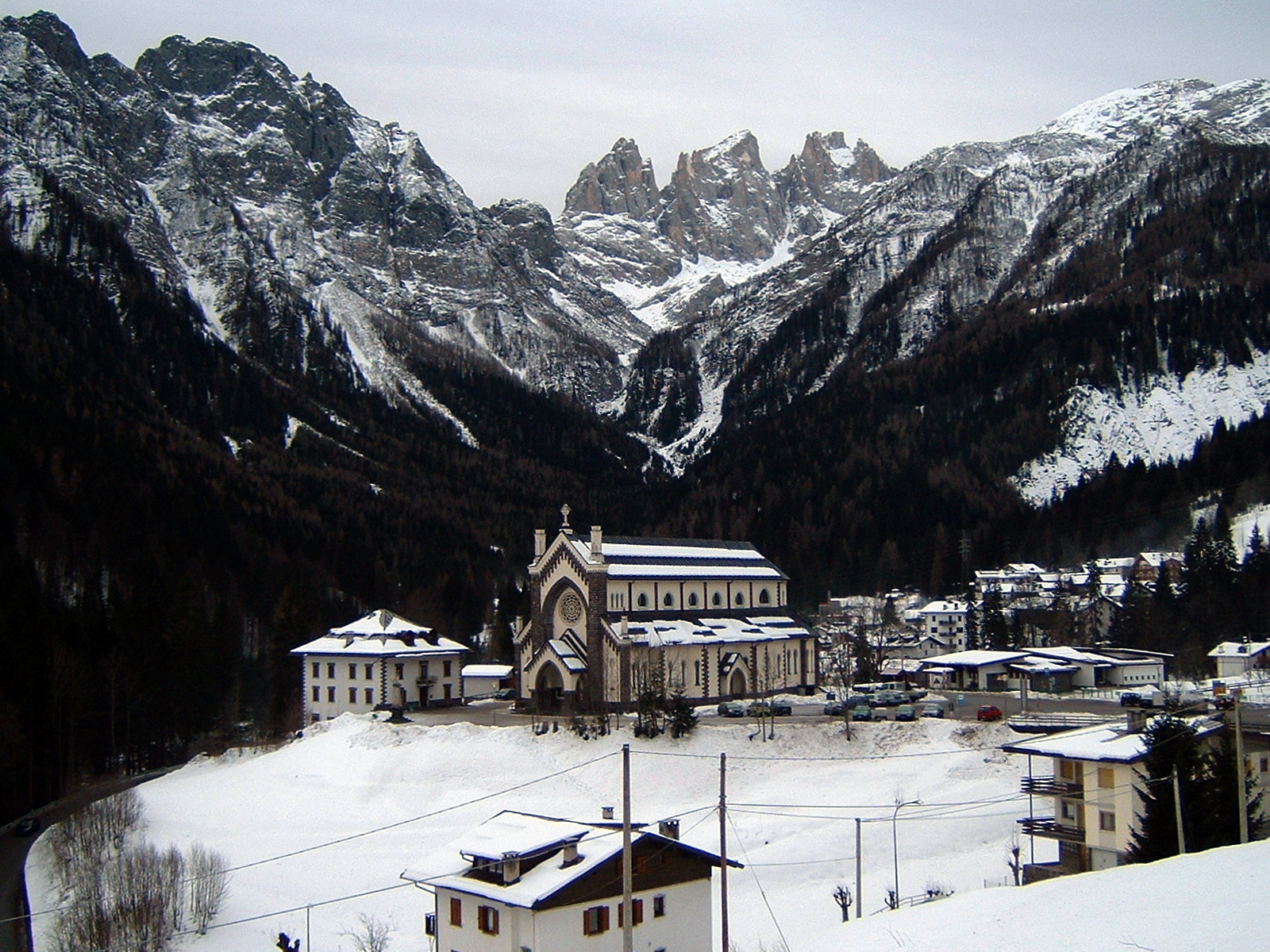
Focobon Group centered on skyline seen from Falcade

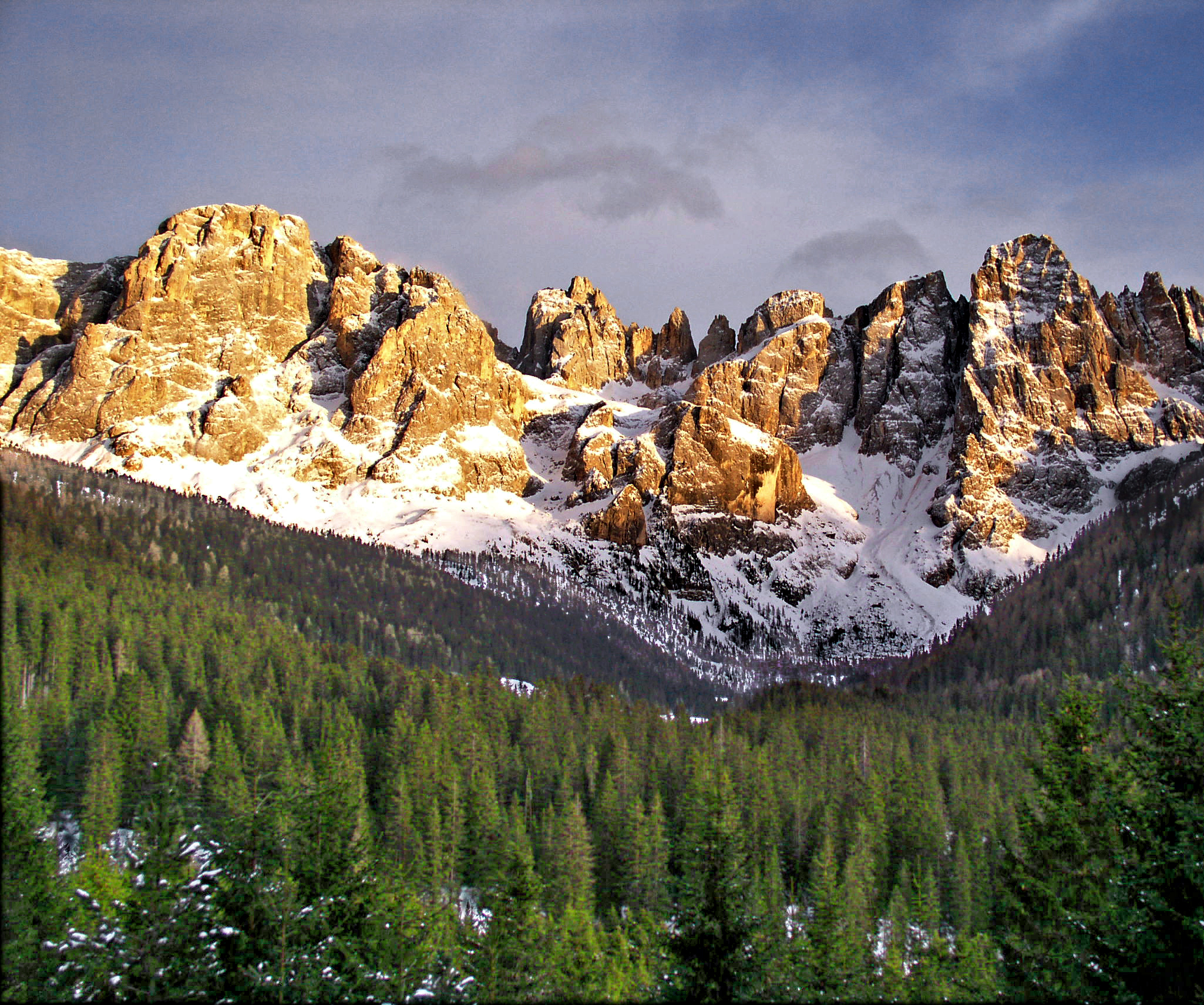
West aspect of Focobon centered on skyline.
Monte Mulaz to left, Cima dei Bureloni to right

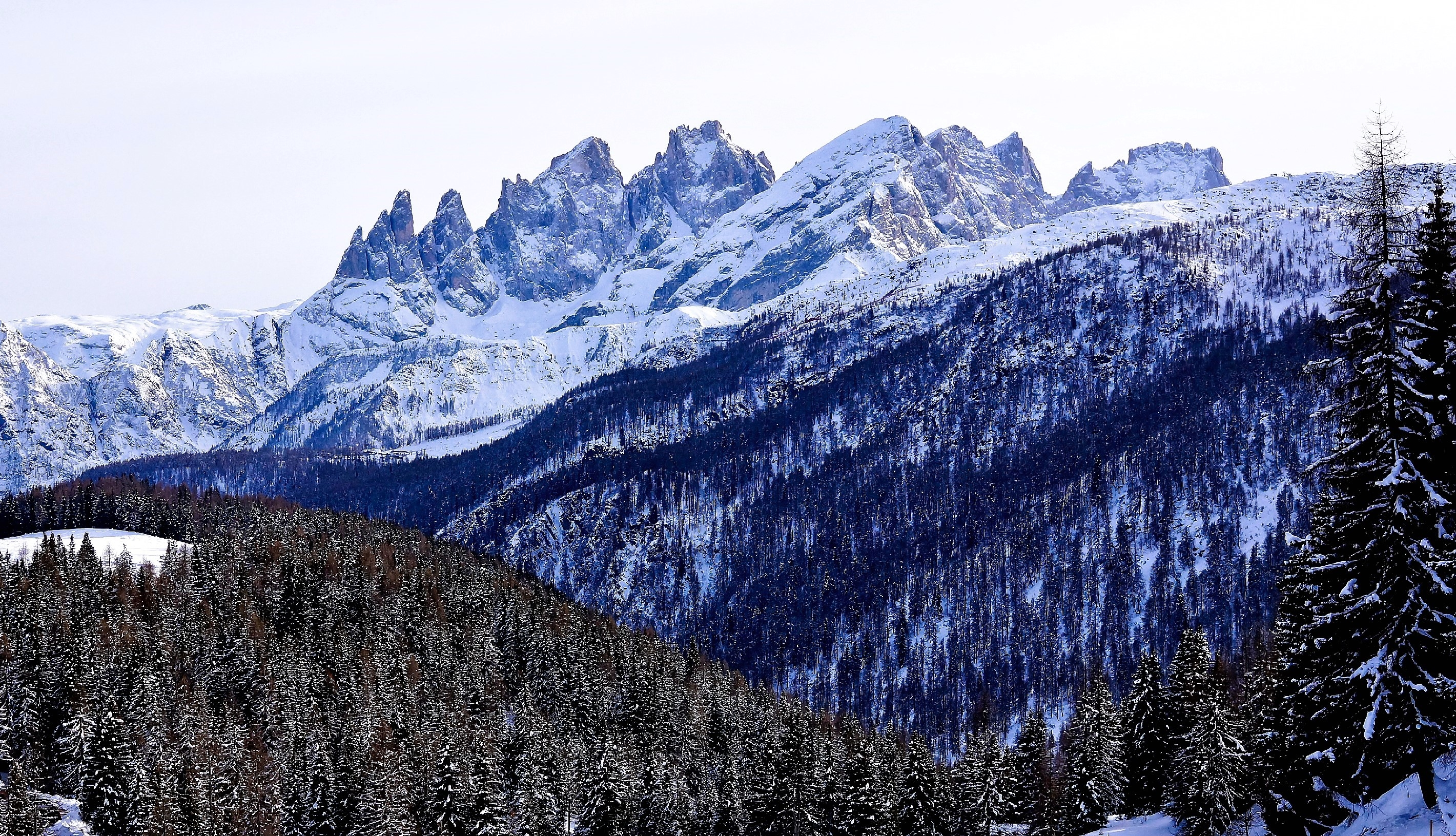
North aspect of Focobon centered on skyline

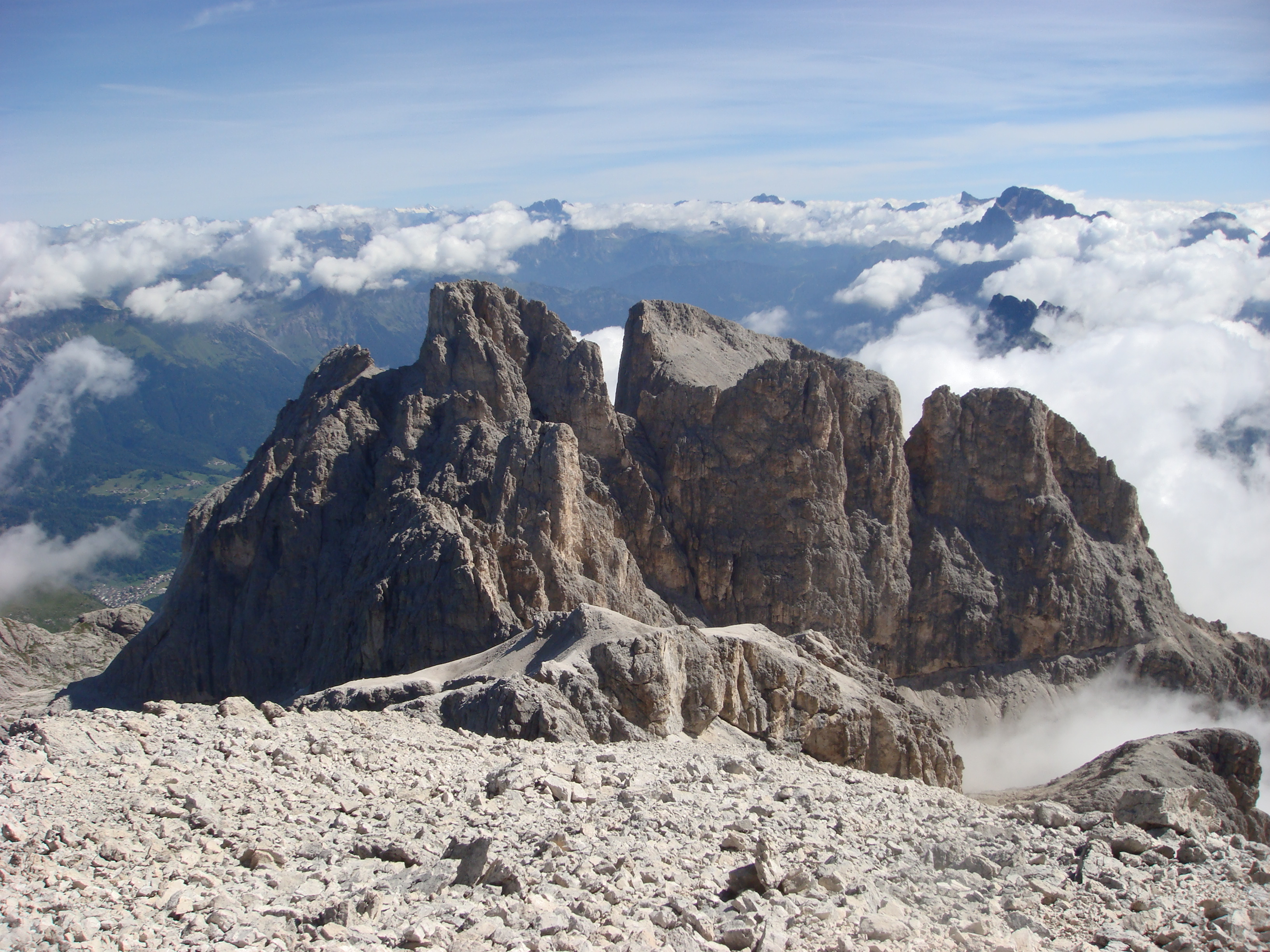
Focobon Group viewed from Cima dei Bureloni

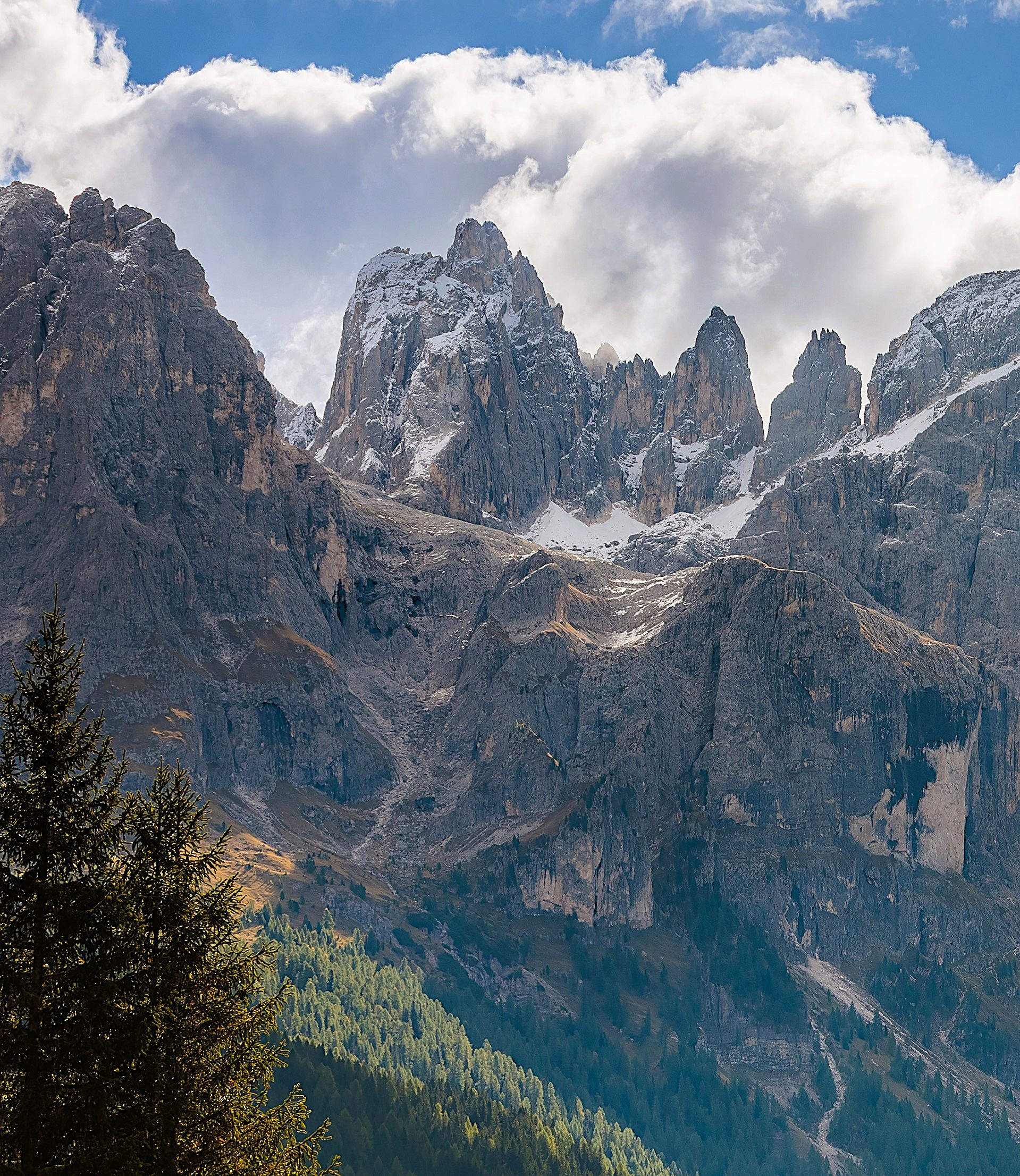
West aspect

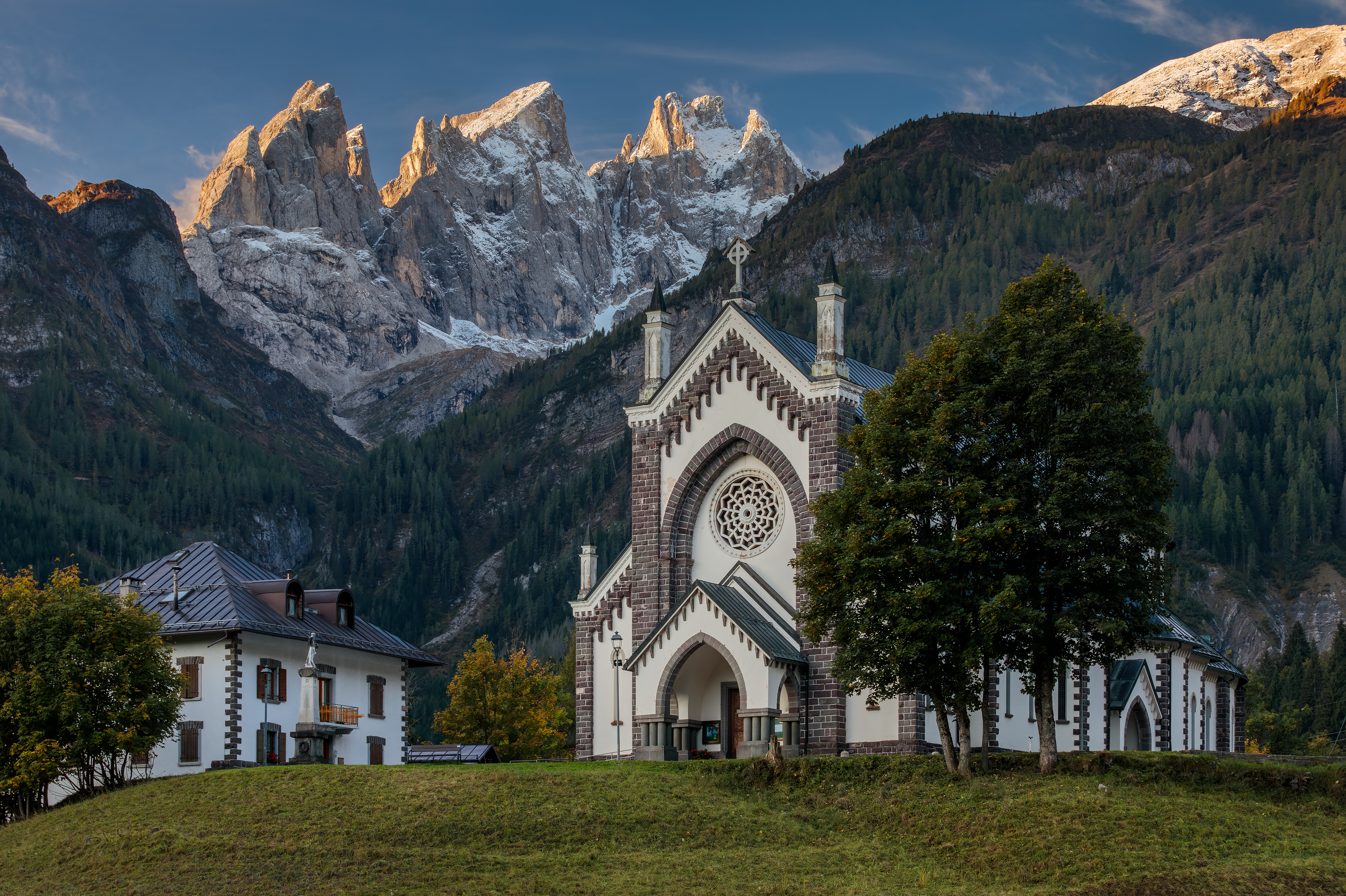

== See also ==
- Southern Limestone Alps
