= Moena =

- Comune
- Comune di Moena
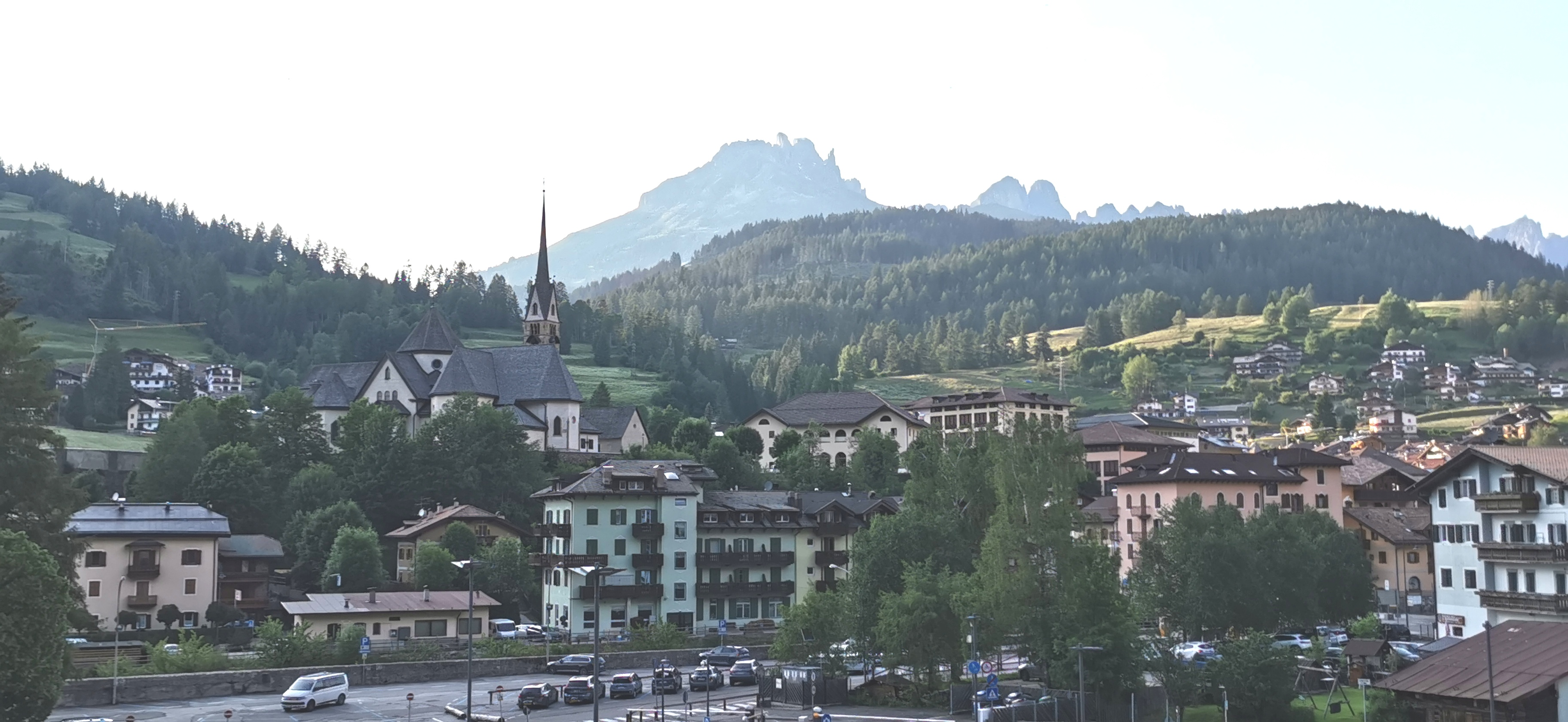

- Coat of arms

- Location within Italy Location within Trentino-Alto Adige/Südtirol
- Coordinates: 46°23′N 11°40′E
- Country: Italy
- Region: Trentino-Alto Adige/Südtirol
- Province: Trentino (TN)
- Frazioni: Forno, Medil, San Pellegrino, Penia, Someda, Sorte

Government
  - Mayor: Alberto Kostner

Area
  - Total: 82.6 km^{2} (31.9 sq mi)
- Elevation: 1,148 m (3,766 ft)

Population (2026)
  - Total: 2,551
  - Density: 30.9/km^{2} (80.0/sq mi)
- Demonym: Moenesi
- Time zone: UTC+1 (CET)
  - Summer (DST): UTC+2 (CEST)
- Postal code: 38035
- Dialing code: 0462
- Patron saint: St. Vigilius
- Saint day: 26 June
- Website: Official website

Moena (Ladin: Moéna) is a comune (municipality) and a village in Trentino in the northern Italian region Trentino-Alto Adige/Südtirol, located about 60 kilometres (37 mi) northeast of Trento. It is the largest comune in the Fassa Valley. In the census of 2001, 1,967 inhabitants out of 2,602 (75.6%) declared Ladin as their native language.

== Geography ==
Moena lies on the Avisio, a tributary of the Adige river. The municipality borders with Falcade, Nova Levante, Sèn Jan di Fassa, Predazzo, Soraga and Tonadico. It counts the hamlets (frazioni) of Forno, Medil, San Pellegrino, Penia, Someda and Sorte.

== Main sights ==
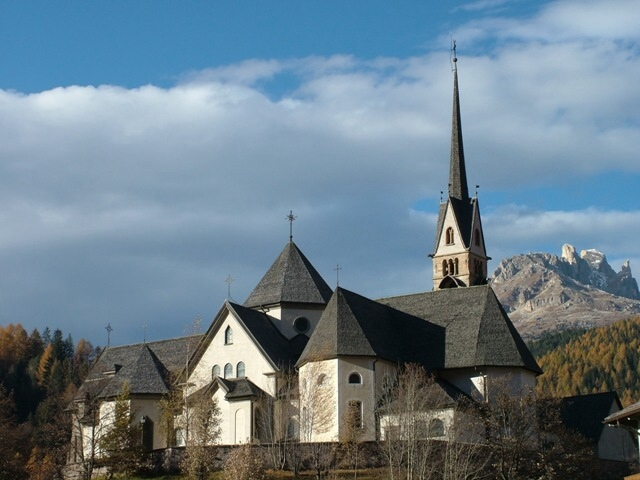
Parish church San Vigilio

Sights include the church of San Vigilio, with a Gothic bell tower and 18th-century paintings by Valentino Rovisi, and the ancient church of San Volfango, with 15th-century frescoes and a Baroque ceiling by Giovanni Guadagnini (17th century).

The festival La Turchia takes place once a year during the 19th of August until the 21st. According to Turkish tradition, villagers have been celebrating this event, which dates back 323 years. An Ottoman janissary, wounded during the Siege of Vienna in 1683, ended up in Moena and changed the life of the village and became a hero. He fell in love with a local woman and founded a family. In the village center, there is a statue of that janissary.

=== People ===
Moena was the home town of Domenico Chiocchetti, who was largely responsible for the decoration of the Italian Chapel in the Orkney Islands during the Second World War. It was also the birthplace of Renzo Chiocchetti, an Olympic competitor in cross-country skiing.

=== Twin town – sister city ===
Moena is twinned with:

- (United Kingdom) Kirkwall, Great Britain (since 1996)

== See also ==
- Puzzone di Moena
- San Pellegrino Pass
