= Tiers, South Tyrol =

Tiers
- Comune
- Gemeinde Tiers; Comune di Tires
- Location within Italy Location within Trentino-Alto Adige/Südtirol
- Coordinates: 46°28′N 11°32′E
- Country: Italy
- Region: Trentino-Alto Adige/Südtirol
- Province: South Tyrol (BZ)
- Frazioni: St. Zyprian, St. Georg

Government
  - Mayor: Armin Villgrattner

Area
  - Total: 42.1 km^{2} (16.3 sq mi)
- Elevation: 1,028 m (3,373 ft)

Population (Nov. 2010)
  - Total: 979
  - Density: 23.3/km^{2} (60.2/sq mi)
- Demonym(s): German: Tierser; Italian: tiresani
- Time zone: UTC+1 (CET)
  - Summer (DST): UTC+2 (CEST)
- Postal code: 39050
- Dialing code: 0471
- Website: Official website

Tiers (German: [ˈtiːɐ̯s]; Italian: Tires [ˈtiːres]) is a comune (municipality) in the province of South Tyrol in northern Italy, located in the Tierser Tal about 15 kilometres (9 mi) east of the city of Bolzano.

== Geography ==
As of November 30, 2010, it had a population of 979 and an area of 42.1 square kilometres (16.3 mi^{2}).

Tiers borders the following municipalities: Kastelruth, Karneid, Völs am Schlern, Welschnofen, Campitello di Fassa, Mazzin, and Sèn Jan di Fassa.

== History ==
The first document about Tiers dates back to 993/94–1005: in a tradition note of the diocese of Freising, the Bavarian Count Otto from the Rapoton family transferred, among other things, his property in "Tieres" to Bishop Gottschalk of Freising.

=== Coat-of-arms ===
The emblem is formed by a bend, helmet shaped, of argent and azure on gules background. It is the insignia of Lords of Velseck who ruled the village from 1200 until 1470 for the Bishops of Brixen. The emblem was granted in 1968.

== Society ==
=== Linguistic distribution ===
According to the 2024 census, 97.14% of the population speak German, 2.54% Italian and 0.32% Ladin as first language.

=== Demographic evolution ===
Historical population

Year	Pop.	±%
1860	?	—
1870	?	—
1880	735	—
1900	?	—
1910	775	—

Year	Pop.	±%
1921	775	+0.0%
1931	774	−0.1%
1936	790	+2.1%
1951	774	−2.0%
1961	772	−0.3%

Year	Pop.	±%
1971	814	+5.4%
1981	823	+1.1%
1991	834	+1.3%
2001	884	+6.0%

Source: Data from ISTAT
