= Mazzin =

- Comune
- Comune di Mazzin
- Flag Coat of arms

- Location within Italy Location within Trentino-Alto Adige/Südtirol
- Coordinates: 46°27′N 11°42′E
- Country: Italy
- Region: Trentino-Alto Adige/Südtirol
- Province: Trentino (TN)
- Frazioni: Campestrin, Fontanazzo (communal seat), Fontanazzo di sopra, Mazzin

Government
  - Mayor: Fausto Castelnuovo

Area
  - Total: 23.7 km^{2} (9.2 sq mi)
- Elevation: 1,395 m (4,577 ft)

Population (2026)
  - Total: 616
  - Density: 26.0/km^{2} (67.3/sq mi)
- Demonym: Mazzinesi
- Time zone: UTC+1 (CET)
  - Summer (DST): UTC+2 (CEST)
- Postal code: 38030
- Dialing code: 0462
- Website: Official website

Mazzin (Ladin: Mazin) is a comune (municipality) in Trentino in the northern Italian region Trentino-Alto Adige/Südtirol, located about 60 km (37 mi) northeast of Trento.

In the census of 2001, 381 inhabitants out of 440 (86.6%) declared Ladin as their native language.

Mazzin borders the following municipalities: Canazei, Campitello di Fassa, Tiers and Sèn Jan di Fassa.

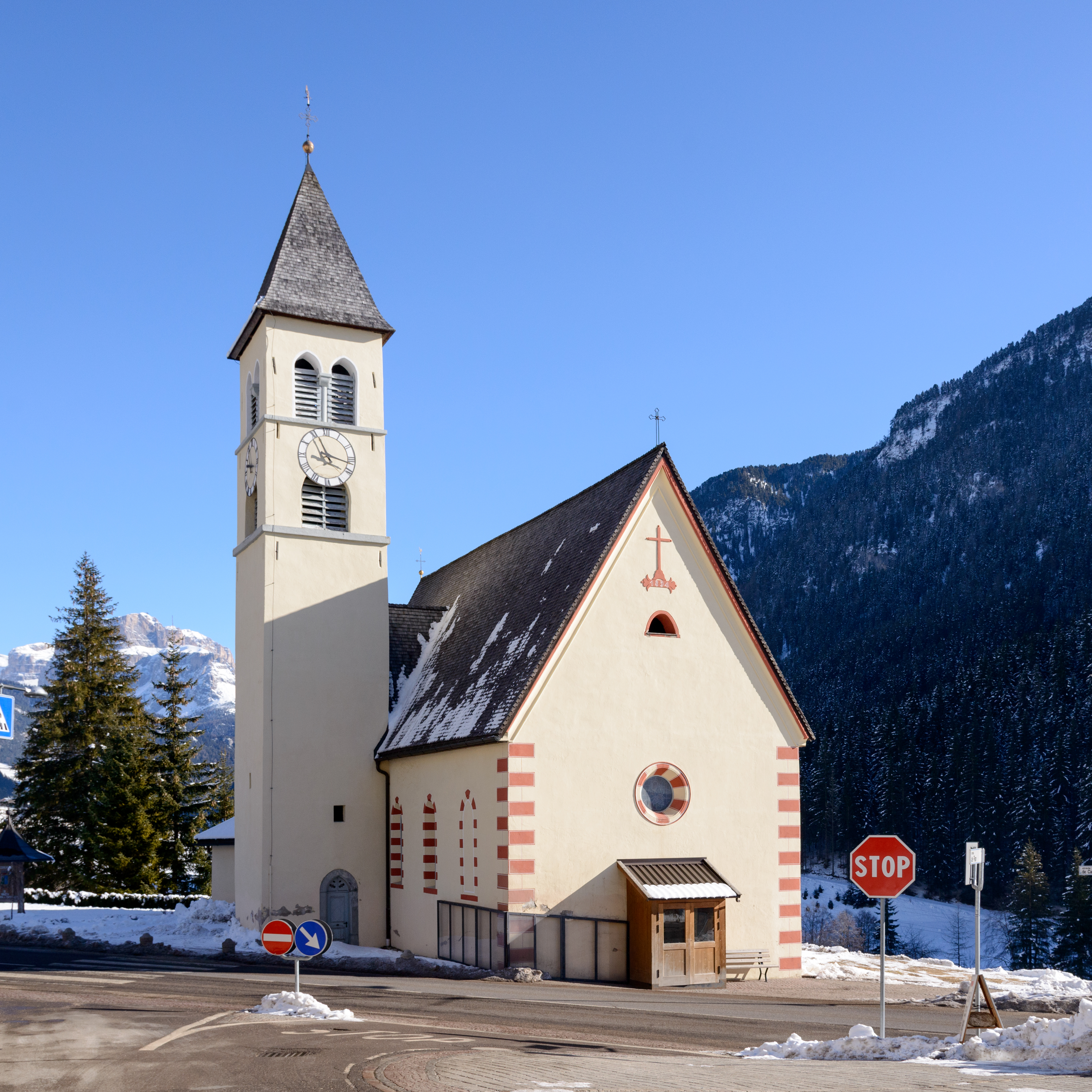
Santa Maria Maddalena church
