= Soraga di Fassa =

- Comune
- Comune di Soraga di Fassa
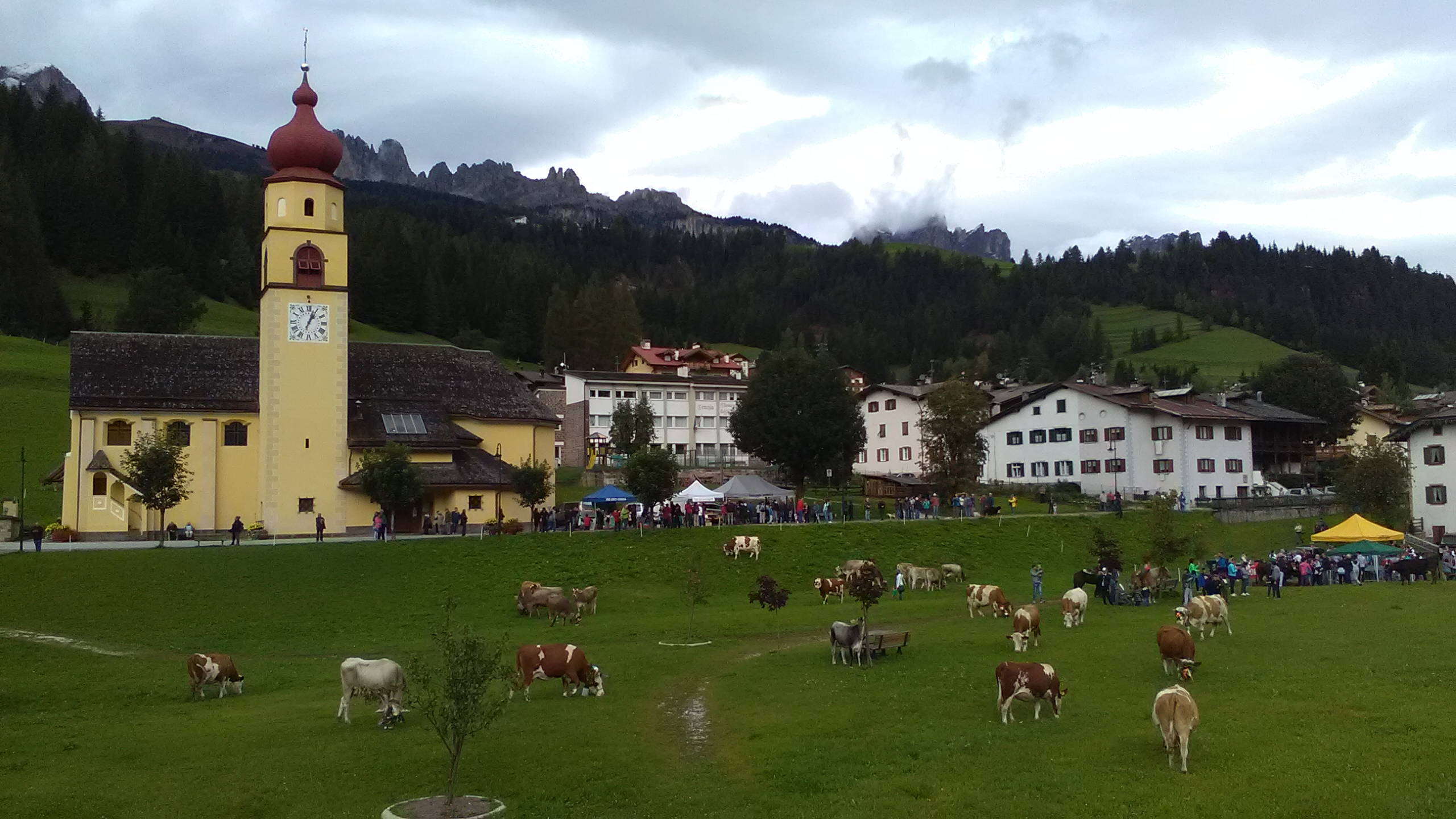

- Location within Italy Location within Trentino-Alto Adige/Südtirol
- Coordinates: 46°24′N 11°40′E
- Country: Italy
- Region: Trentino-Alto Adige/Südtirol
- Province: Trentino (TN)

Government
  - Mayor: Valerio Pederiva

Area
  - Total: 19.6 km^{2} (7.6 sq mi)
- Elevation: 1,207 m (3,960 ft)

Population (28 February 2017)
  - Total: 718
  - Density: 36.6/km^{2} (94.9/sq mi)
- Demonym: Soragani or Soraghesi
- Time zone: UTC+1 (CET)
  - Summer (DST): UTC+2 (CEST)
- Postal code: 38030
- Dialing code: 0462
- Website: Official website

Soraga di Fassa (Ladin: Soraga or Soréga) is a comune (municipality) in Trentino in the northern Italian region Trentino-Alto Adige/Südtirol, located about 60 kilometres (37 mi) northeast of Trento. Soraga borders the following municipalities: Sèn Jan di Fassa, Falcade and Moena.

In the census of 2001, 574 inhabitants out of 673 (85.3%) declared Ladin as their native language.
