= Campitello di Fassa =

Campitello di Fassa Ciampedel (Ladin)
- Comune
- Comune di Campitello di Fassa
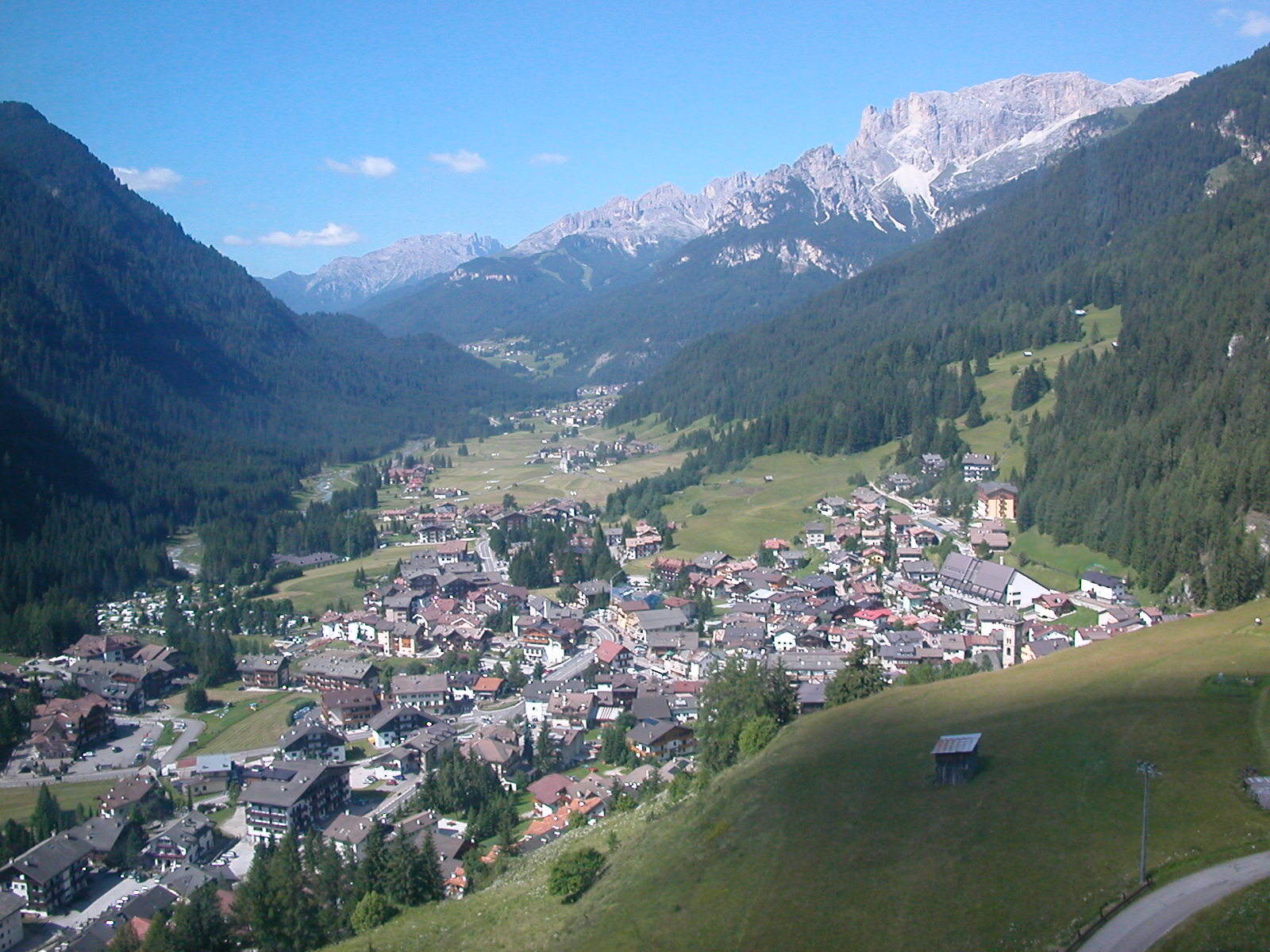

- Location within Italy Location within Trentino-Alto Adige/Südtirol
- Coordinates: 46°29′N 11°44′E
- Country: Italy
- Region: Trentino-Alto Adige/Südtirol
- Province: Trentino (TN)

Government
  - Mayor: Alessandro Bernard

Area
  - Total: 25.1 km^{2} (9.7 sq mi)
- Elevation: 1,448 m (4,751 ft)

Population (2026)
  - Total: 661
  - Density: 26.3/km^{2} (68.2/sq mi)
- Time zone: UTC+1 (CET)
  - Summer (DST): UTC+2 (CEST)
- Postal code: 38031
- Dialing code: 0462
- Website: Official website

Campitello di Fassa (Ladin: Ciampedel [tʃampeˈdɛl, tʃampeˈdel]) is a comune (municipality) in Trentino in the northern Italian region of Trentino-Alto Adige/Südtirol, located about 70 kilometres (43 mi) northeast of Trento (100 km by road).

In the census of 2001, 625 inhabitants out of 732 (85.4%) declared Ladin as their native language.

== Geography ==
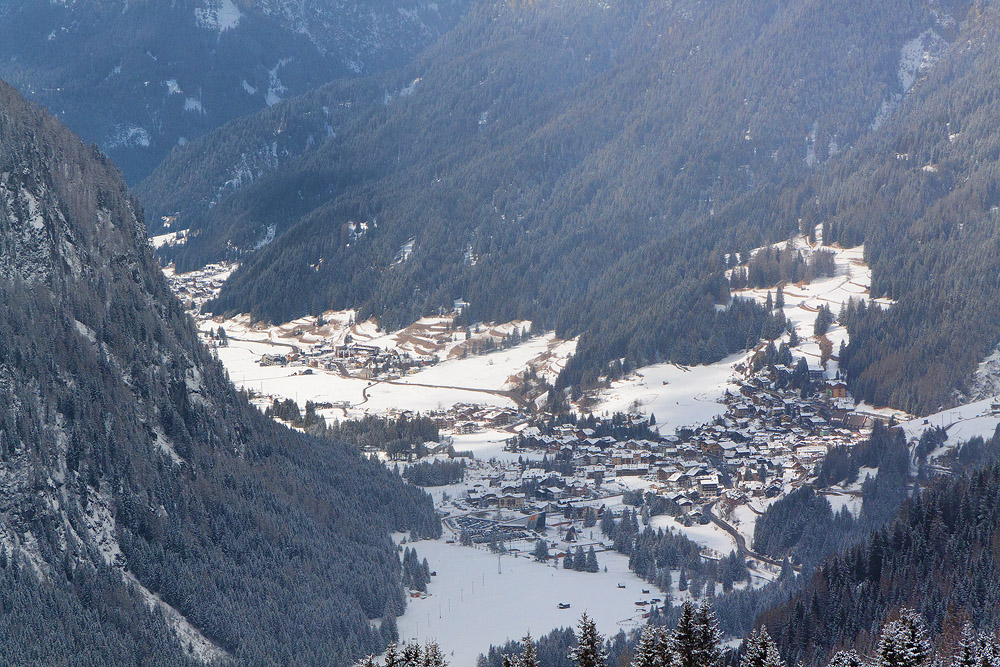
Campitello di Fassa (foreground) and Fontanazzo (top left)

As of 31 December 2004, it had a population of 741 and an area of 25.1 square kilometres (9.7 mi^{2}).

Campitello di Fassa borders the following municipalities: Santa Cristina Gherdëina, Sëlva, Kastelruth, Canazei, Tiers, and Mazzin.

== Demographic evolution ==
Historical population

Year	Pop.	±%
1861	?	—
1871	?	—
1881	?	—
1901	?	—
1911	?	—

Year	Pop.	±%
1921	544	—
1931	514	−5.5%
1936	451	−12.3%
1951	481	+6.7%
1961	477	−0.8%

Year	Pop.	±%
1971	588	+23.3%
1981	653	+11.1%
1991	708	+8.4%
2001	732	+3.4%

Source: Data from ISTAT
