= Falcade =

Falcade Falciade
- Comune
- Comune di Falcade
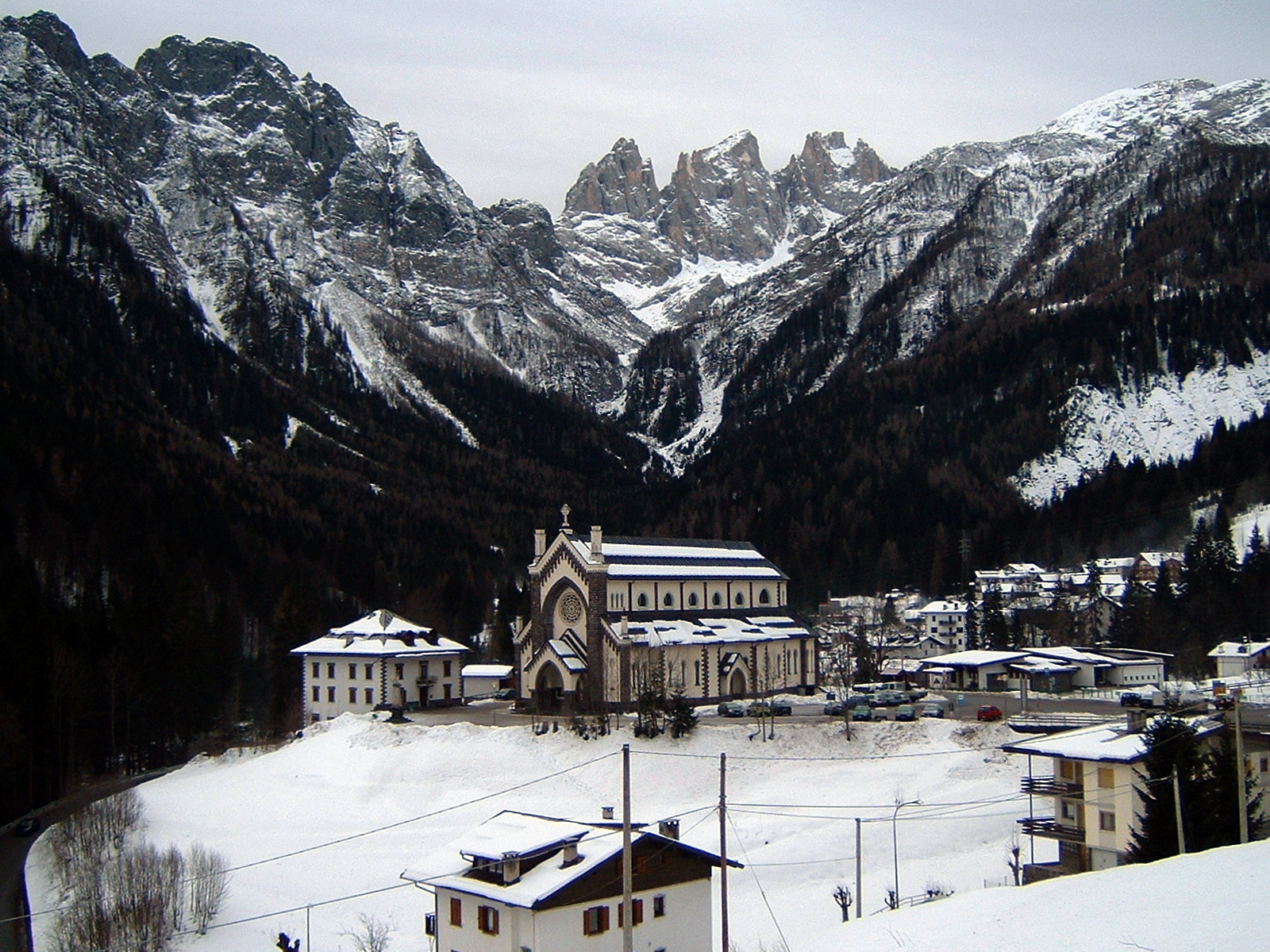

- Location within Italy Location within Veneto
- Coordinates: 46°22′N 11°52′E
- Country: Italy
- Region: Veneto
- Province: Belluno (BL)
- Frazioni: Sappade, Caviola, Valt, Coste, Somor, Le fratte, Marmolada, Tabiadon di Canes, Tabiadon di Val

Government
  - Mayor: Michele Costa

Area
  - Total: 52.8 km^{2} (20.4 sq mi)
- Elevation: 1,148 m (3,766 ft)

Population (31 December 2017)
  - Total: 1,901
  - Density: 36.0/km^{2} (93.2/sq mi)
- Demonym: Falcadini
- Time zone: UTC+1 (CET)
  - Summer (DST): UTC+2 (CEST)
- Postal code: 32020
- Dialing code: 0437
- Patron saint: Saint Sebastian
- Saint day: 20 January
- Website: Official website

Falcade (Ladin: Falciade, German: Pfalden) is a comune (municipality) in the Province of Belluno in the Italian region Veneto, located about 110 kilometres (68 mi) northwest of Venice and about 35 kilometres (22 mi) northwest of Belluno.

Falcade borders the following municipalities: Canale d'Agordo, Moena, Rocca Pietore, Soraga, Tonadico.

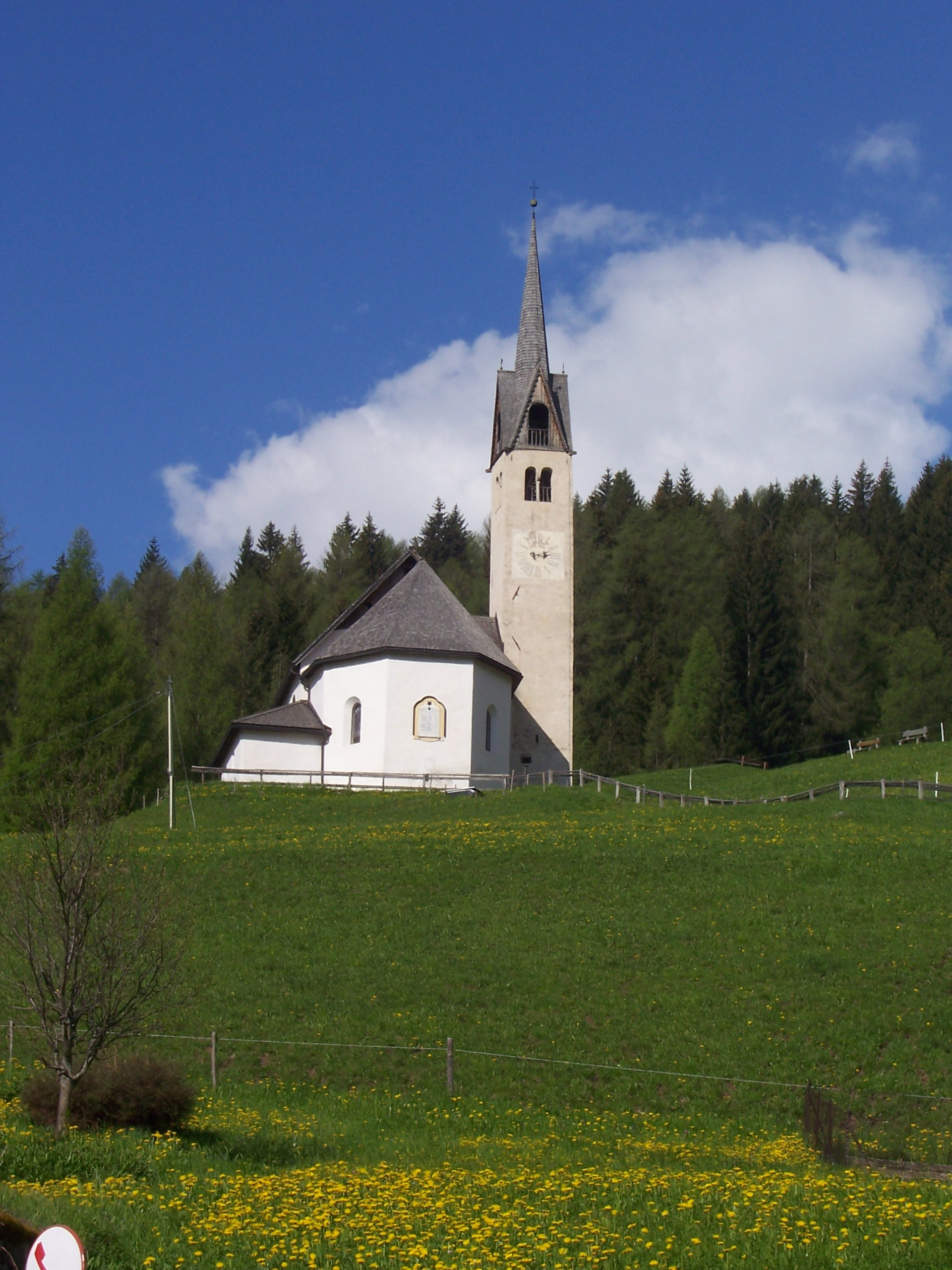
The old Church of Caviola

Falcade is on the edge of the Trevalli Ski Area: 100 kilometres (62 mi) of slopes stretching between Veneto and Trentino regions which in turn is part of the Dolomite Super Ski area. It is also popular in the summer with walkers and mountain bikers.

Landmarks include the Church of Falcade, the Focobon massif (3,504 m) and the Mount Mulaz (2,906 m).

== Twin towns ==
Falcade is twinned with:

- Massaranduba, Brazil, since 2011

== People ==
- Angelo Genuin (born 1939), ski mountaineer and cross-country skier
