= Vigo di Fassa =

- Frazione
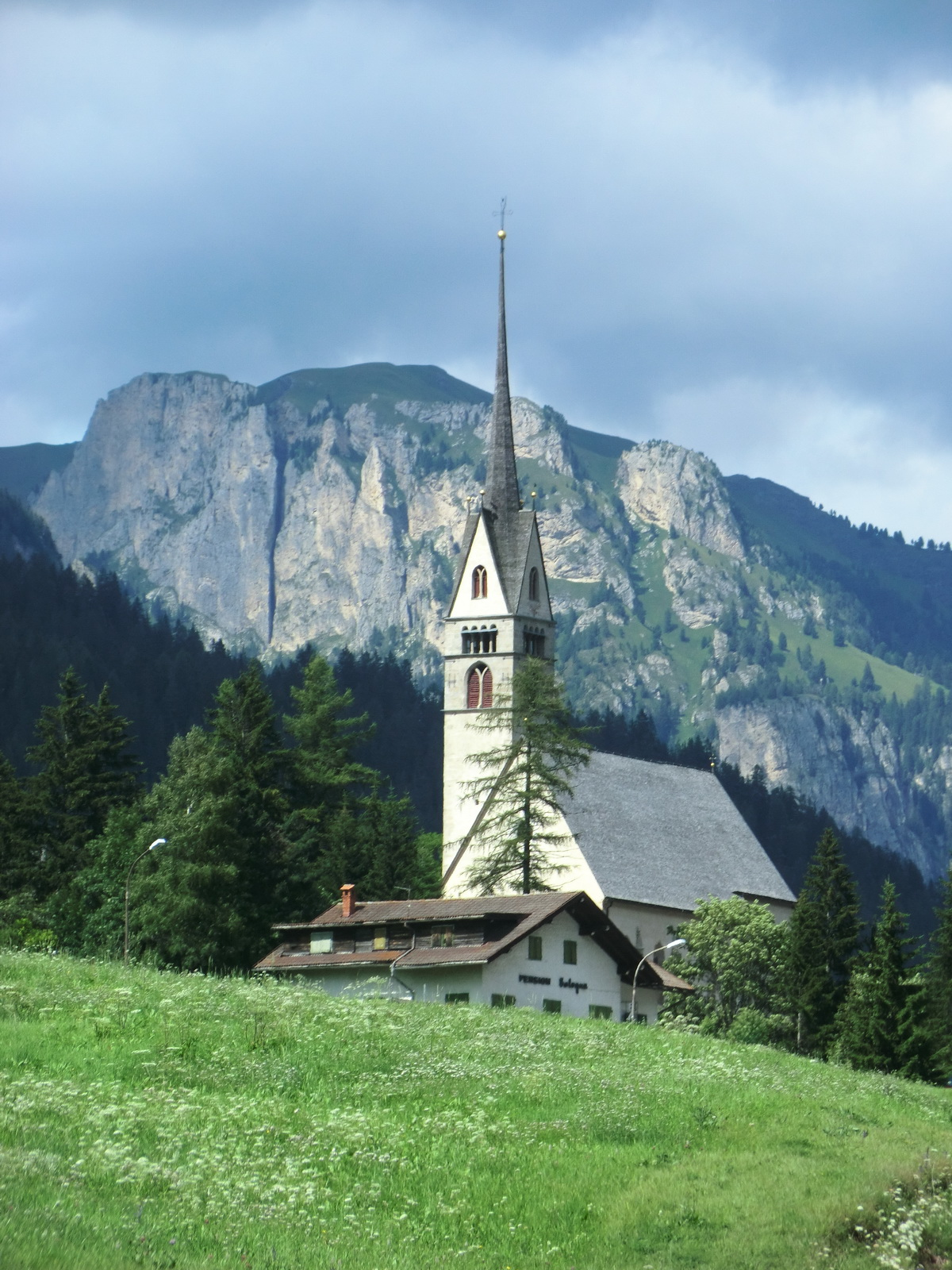
- Church of San Giovanni.

- Location of Vigo di Fassa in Italy
- Coordinates: 46°25′N 11°40′E
- Country: Italy
- Region: Trentino-Alto Adige/Südtirol
- Province: Trentino (TN)
- Comune: Sèn Jan di Fassa

Area
  - Total: 26.7 km^{2} (10.3 sq mi)
- Elevation: 1,382 m (4,534 ft)

Population (28 February 2017)
  - Total: 1,252
  - Density: 46.9/km^{2} (121/sq mi)
- Demonym: Vigani
- Time zone: UTC+1 (CET)
  - Summer (DST): UTC+2 (CEST)
- Postal code: 38039
- Dialing code: 0462

Vigo di Fassa (Ladin: Vich de Fascia, German: Wiegen im Fasstal or Vig im Fasstal) is a frazione of Sèn Jan di Fassa in Trentino in the northern Italian region Trentino-Alto Adige/Südtirol, located about 60 kilometres (37 mi) northeast of Trento.

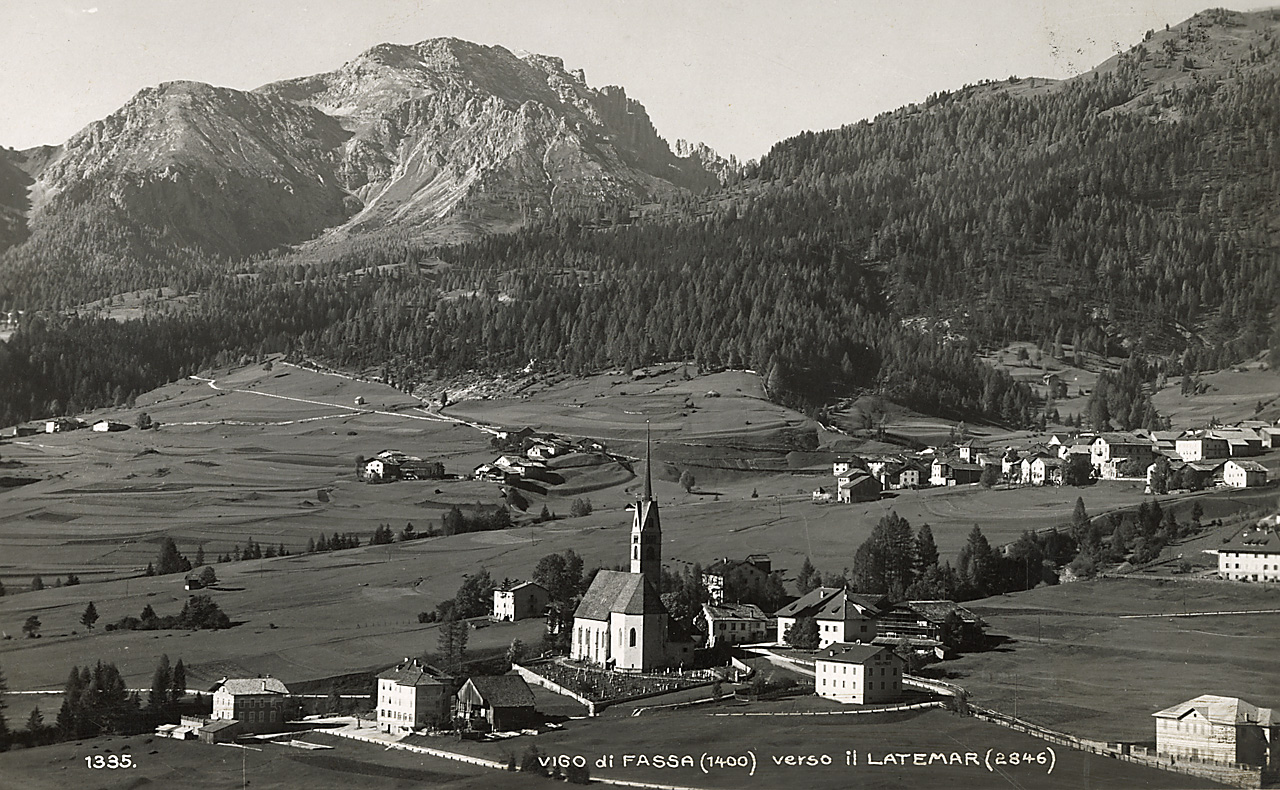
Vigo di Fassa towards Latemar in an early 20th-century photograph

In the census of 2001, 921 inhabitants out of 1,073 (85.8%) declared Ladin as their native language.
