= San Giovanni di Fassa =

- Comune
- Comune di San Giovanni di Fassa
- Location within Trentino-Alto Adige/Südtirol Location within Italy
- Coordinates: 46°25′48.72″N 11°41′8.88″E
- Country: Italy
- Region: Trentino-Alto Adige/Südtirol
- Province: Trentino (TN)
- Frazioni: Costa, Larzonei, Monzon, Passo Carezza, Pera di Fassa, Pozza di Fassa, Ronch, San Giovanni, Tamion, Vallonga, Vigo di Fassa

Government
  - Mayor: Giulio Florian

Area
  - Total: 38.54 km^{2} (14.88 sq mi)

Population (31 December 2016)
  - Total: 3,528
  - Density: 91.54/km^{2} (237.1/sq mi)
- Time zone: UTC+1 (CET)
  - Summer (DST): UTC+2 (CEST)
- Postal code: 38036
- Dialing code: 0462
- Website: Official website

San Giovanni di Fassa (in ladin: Sèn Jan) is a comune (municipality) in Trentino in the northern Italian region Trentino-Alto Adige/Südtirol. It was formed on 1 January 2018 after the merger of the former comuni of Pozza di Fassa and Vigo di Fassa. It is one of I Borghi più belli d'Italia ("The most beautiful villages of Italy").

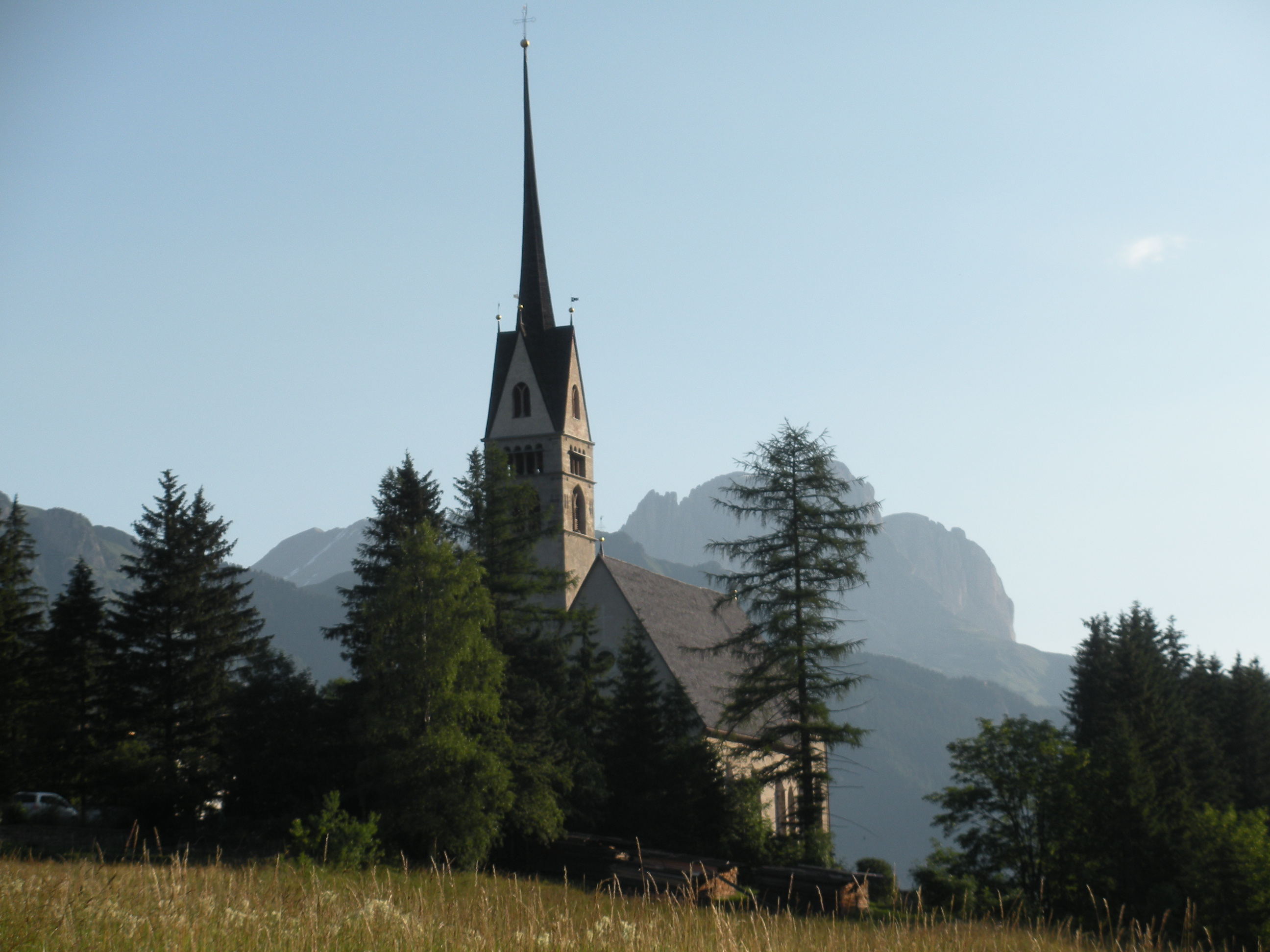
Vigo di Fassa (TN), Church of San Giovanni, 2009
