= Campanile di Val Strut =

Summit in Italy

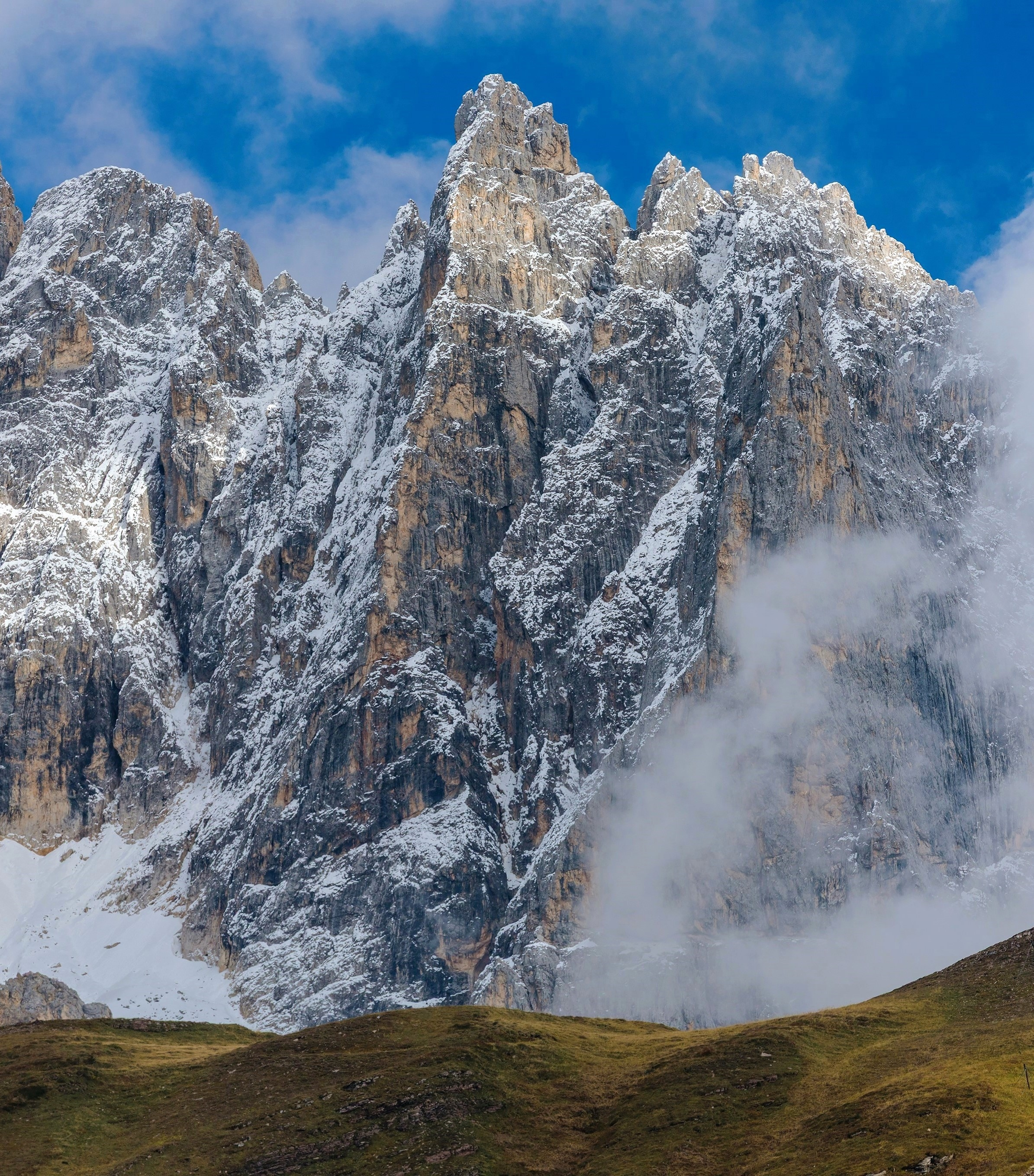
- West aspect

Highest point
- Elevation: 3,049 m (10,003 ft)
- Prominence: 34 m (112 ft)
- Parent peak: Cima dei Bureloni
- Coordinates: 46°17′45″N 11°49′57″E

Geography
- Location within Italy Location within Alps
- Interactive map of Campanile di Val Strut
- Country: Italy
- Province: Trentino / Belluno
- Protected area: Paneveggio-Pale di San Martino Natural Park
- Parent range: Dolomites; Pale di San Martino
- Topo map: Tabacco 022 Pale di San Martino

Geology
- Rock age: Triassic
- Rock type: Dolomite

Climbing
- First ascent: 1897
- Easiest route: Southeast side

Campanile di Val Strut is a mountain peak on the common boundary between the provinces of Trentino and Belluno in northern Italy.

== Description ==
Campanile di Val Strut, spelled Campanile di Val Strutt on the official IGM map, is a 3,049-meter-elevation (10,003-foot) summit in the Pale di San Martino group of the Dolomites. The peak is located four kilometers (2.5 miles) north-northeast of San Martino di Castrozza mountain resort, and the peak is the fourth-highest within Paneveggio-Pale di San Martino Natural Park, a UNESCO World Heritage Site. Precipitation runoff from the mountain's west slope drains into Torrente Travignolo which is a tributary of the Avisio, whereas the east slope drains into tributaries of the Piave. Topographic relief is significant as the summit rises over 1,200 meters (3,937 feet) above the Comelle Valley in two kilometers (1.24 miles); 450 meters (1,476 feet) above Strutt Valley in 0.5 kilometer (0.31 mile); and 1,050 meters (3,445 feet) along the west slope in one kilometer (0.6 mile). The mountain's toponym translates as "Bell tower of Strutt Valley." The first ascent of the summit was made on July 17, 1897, by Giacomo Faoro, Felice Oss Mazzurana, Walter Theel, and Giuseppe Zecchini via the northeast side. The nearest higher neighbor is Cima dei Bureloni, 64 meters (211 ft) to the north.

== Climate ==
Based on the Köppen climate classification, Campanile di Val Strut is located in an alpine climate zone with long, cold winters, and short, mild summers. Weather systems are forced upward by the mountains (orographic lift), causing moisture to drop in the form of rain and snow. The months of June through September offer the most favorable weather for visiting or climbing in this area.

== Gallery ==
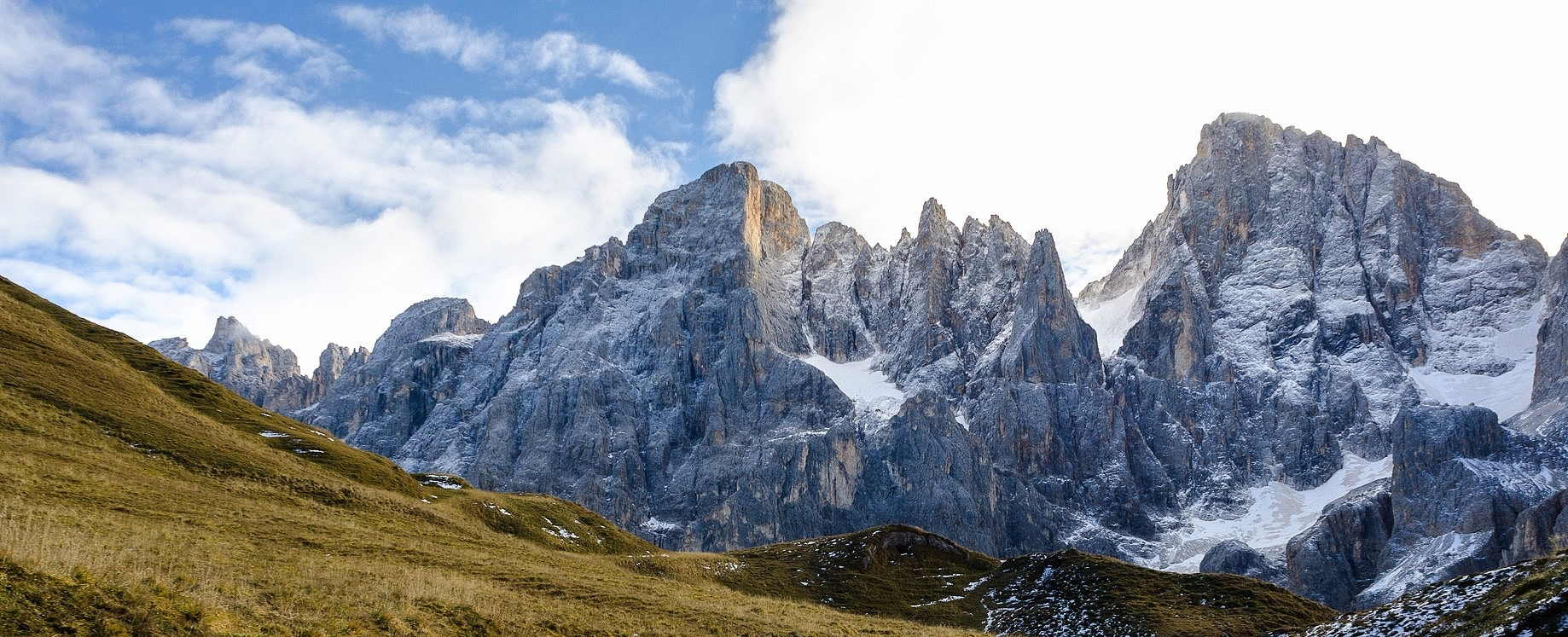
Cima dei Bureloni centered, Vezzana to right, Campanile di Val Strut between the two

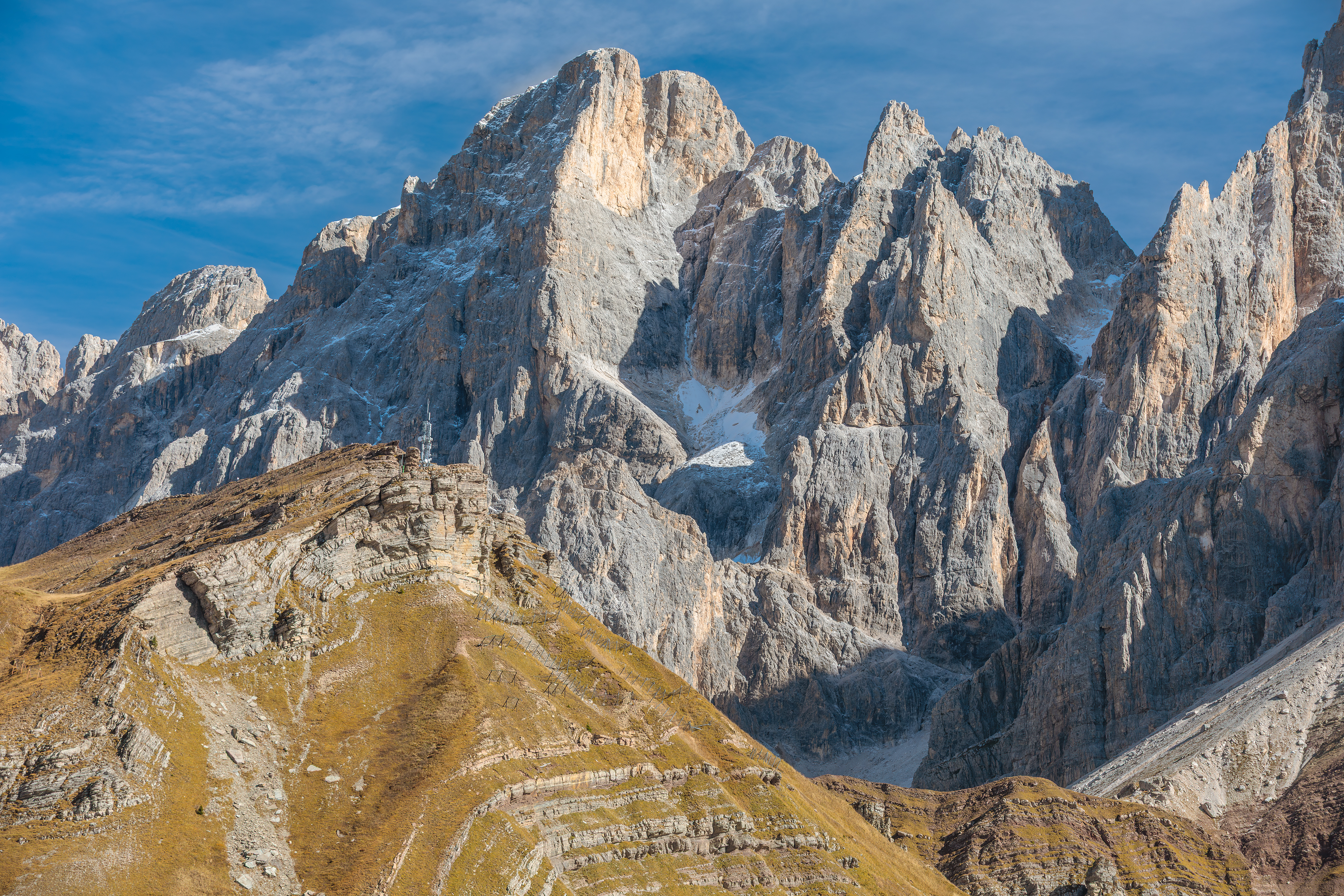
Cima dei Bureloni and Campanile di Val Strut

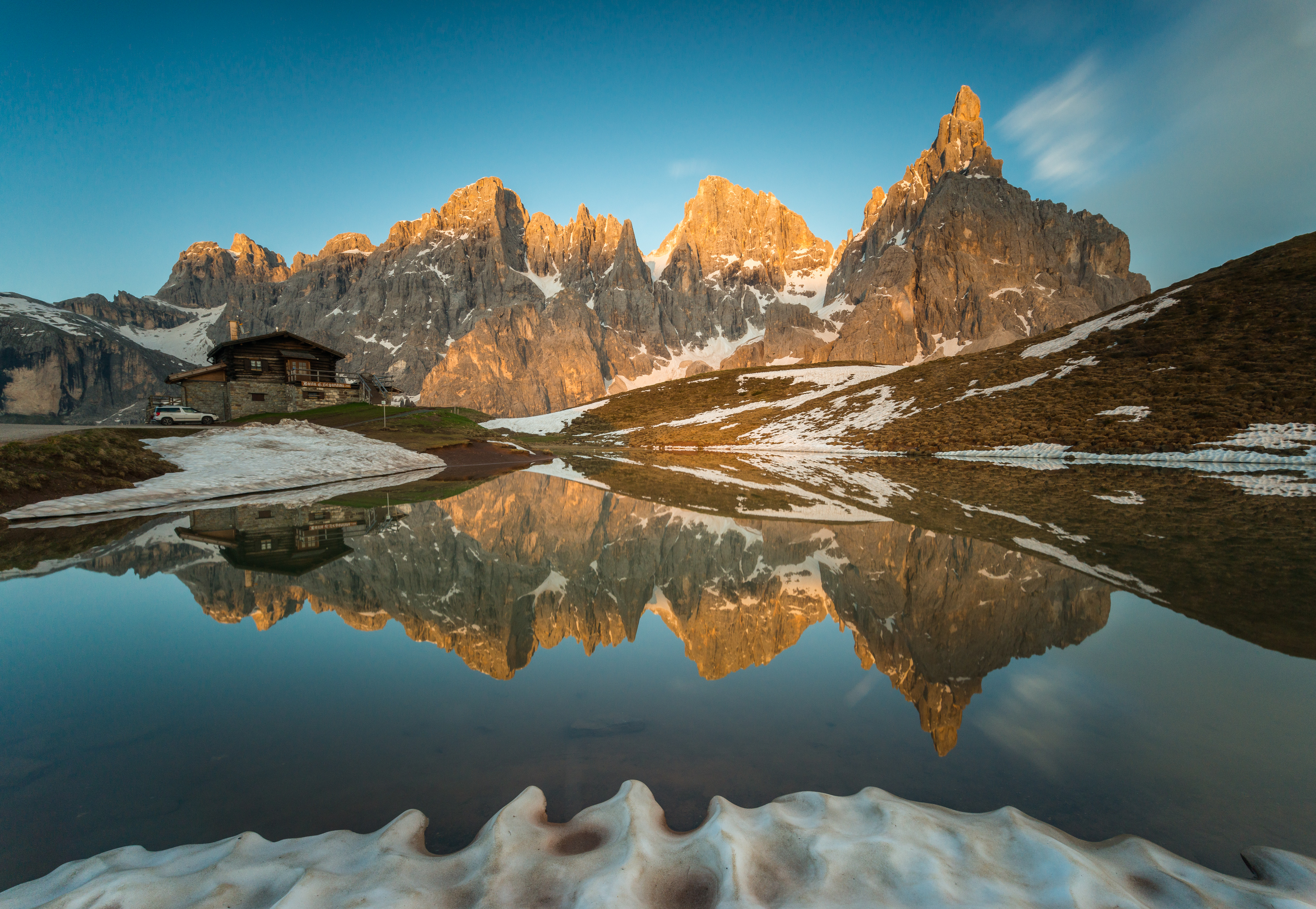
Bureloni, Campanile di Val Strut, Vezzana, and Cimon della Pala

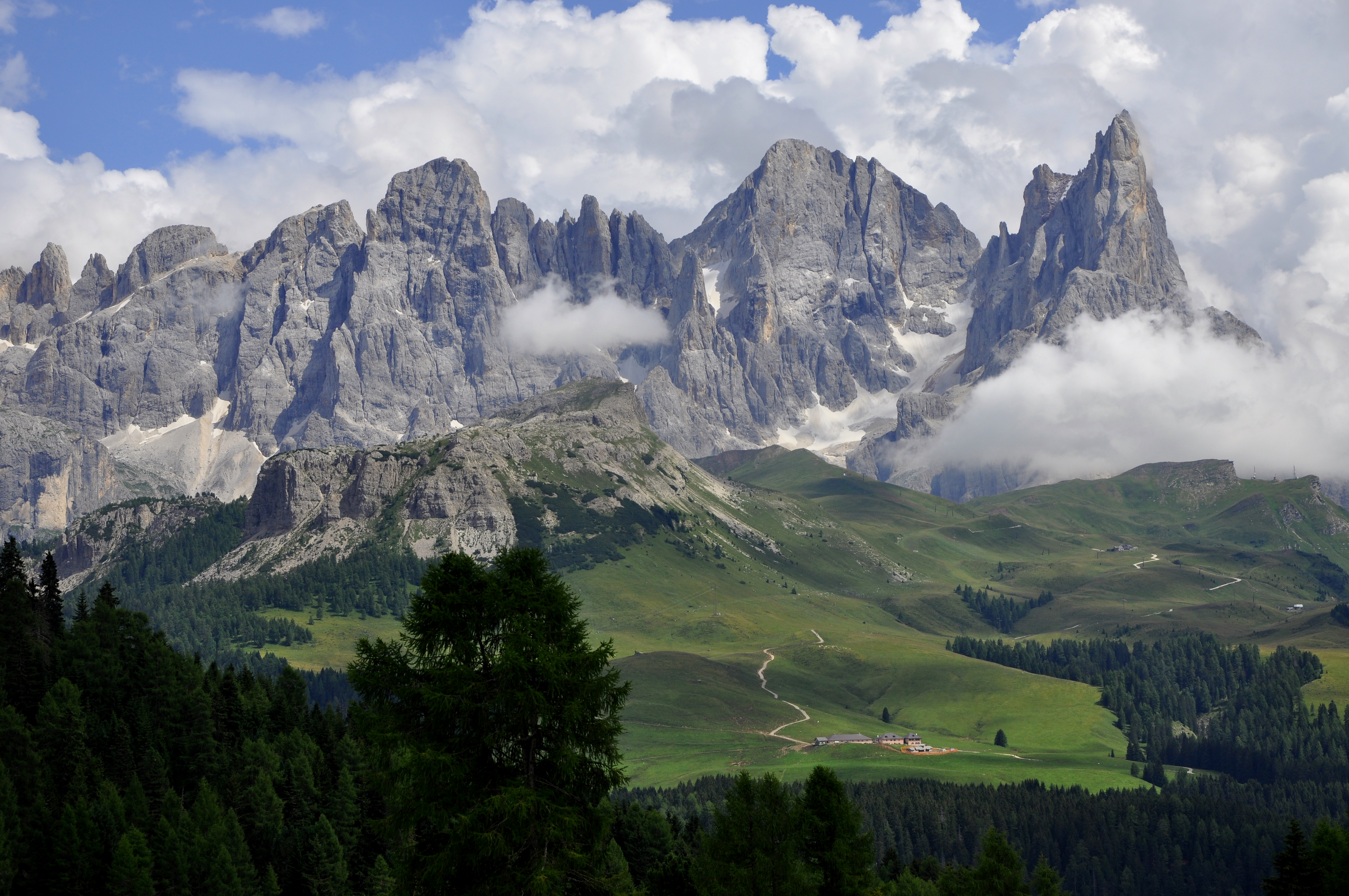
Bureloni, Campanile di Val Strut, Vezzana, and Cimon della Pala

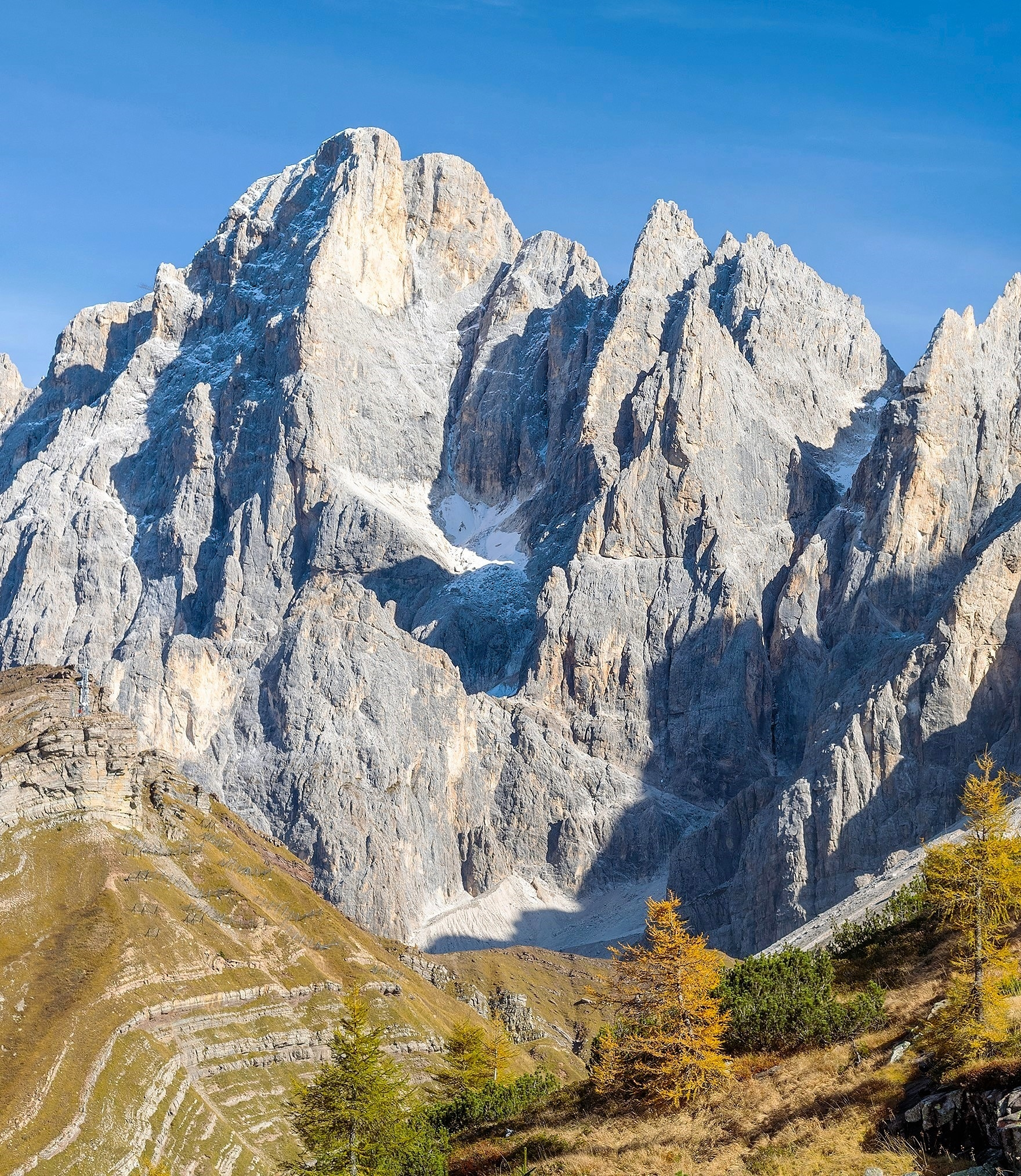
Cima dei Bureloni and Campanile di Val Strut

== See also ==
- Southern Limestone Alps
