= Cima d'Ostio =

Mountain in Italy

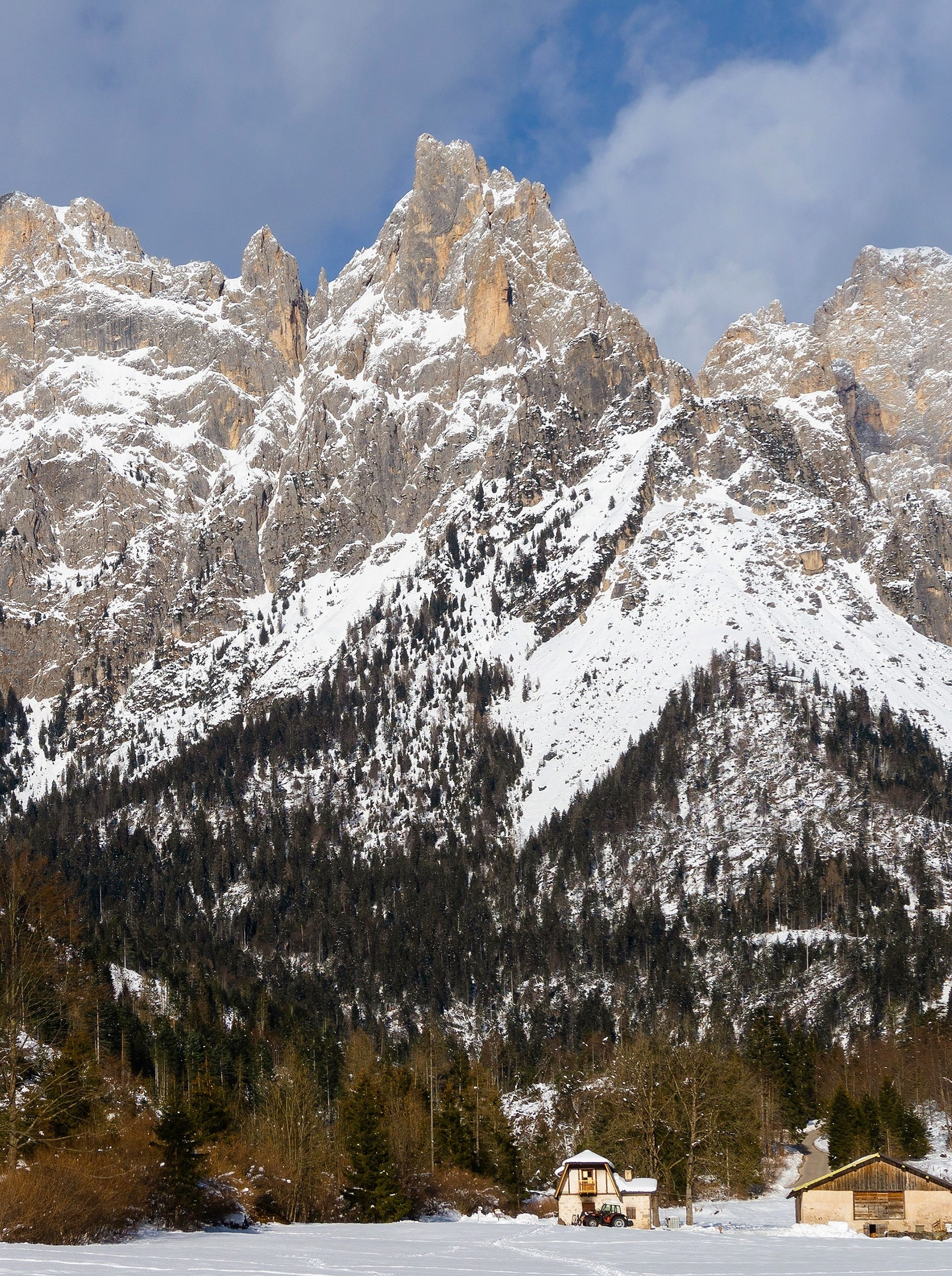
- South aspect in winter

Highest point
- Elevation: 2,405 m (7,890 ft)
- Prominence: 143 m (469 ft)
- Isolation: 0.77 km (0.48 mi)
- Coordinates: 46°14′02″N 11°52′45″E

Geography
- Location within Italy Location within Alps
- Interactive map of Cima d'Ostio
- Country: Italy
- Region: Trentino-Alto Adige/Südtirol
- Protected area: Paneveggio-Pale di San Martino Natural Park
- Parent range: Dolomites; Pale di San Martino
- Topo map: Tabacco 22 Pale di San Martino

Geology
- Rock age: Triassic
- Rock type: Dolomite

Cima d'Ostio is a mountain in the Trentino-Alto Adige/Südtirol region of northern Italy.

== Description ==
Cima d'Ostio is a 2,405-meter-elevation (7,890-foot) summit in the Pale di San Martino group of the Dolomites. Set in the province of Trentino, the peak is located six kilometers (3.7 miles) north-northeast of the municipality of Primiero San Martino di Castrozza and within Paneveggio-Pale di San Martino Natural Park, a UNESCO World Heritage Site. Precipitation runoff from the mountain's slopes drains into Torrente Canali which is a tributary of the Cismon. Topographic relief is significant as the summit rises 1,000 meters (3,280 feet) above the Canali Valley in one kilometer (0.6 mile). The nearest higher neighbor is Sasso delle Lede, 0.77 kilometer (0.48 miles) to the northwest.

== Climate ==
Based on the Köppen climate classification, Cima d'Ostio is located in an alpine climate zone with long, cold winters, and short, mild summers. Weather systems are forced upward by the mountains (orographic lift), causing moisture to drop in the form of rain and snow. The months of June through September offer the most favorable weather for climbing or visiting this area.

== Gallery ==
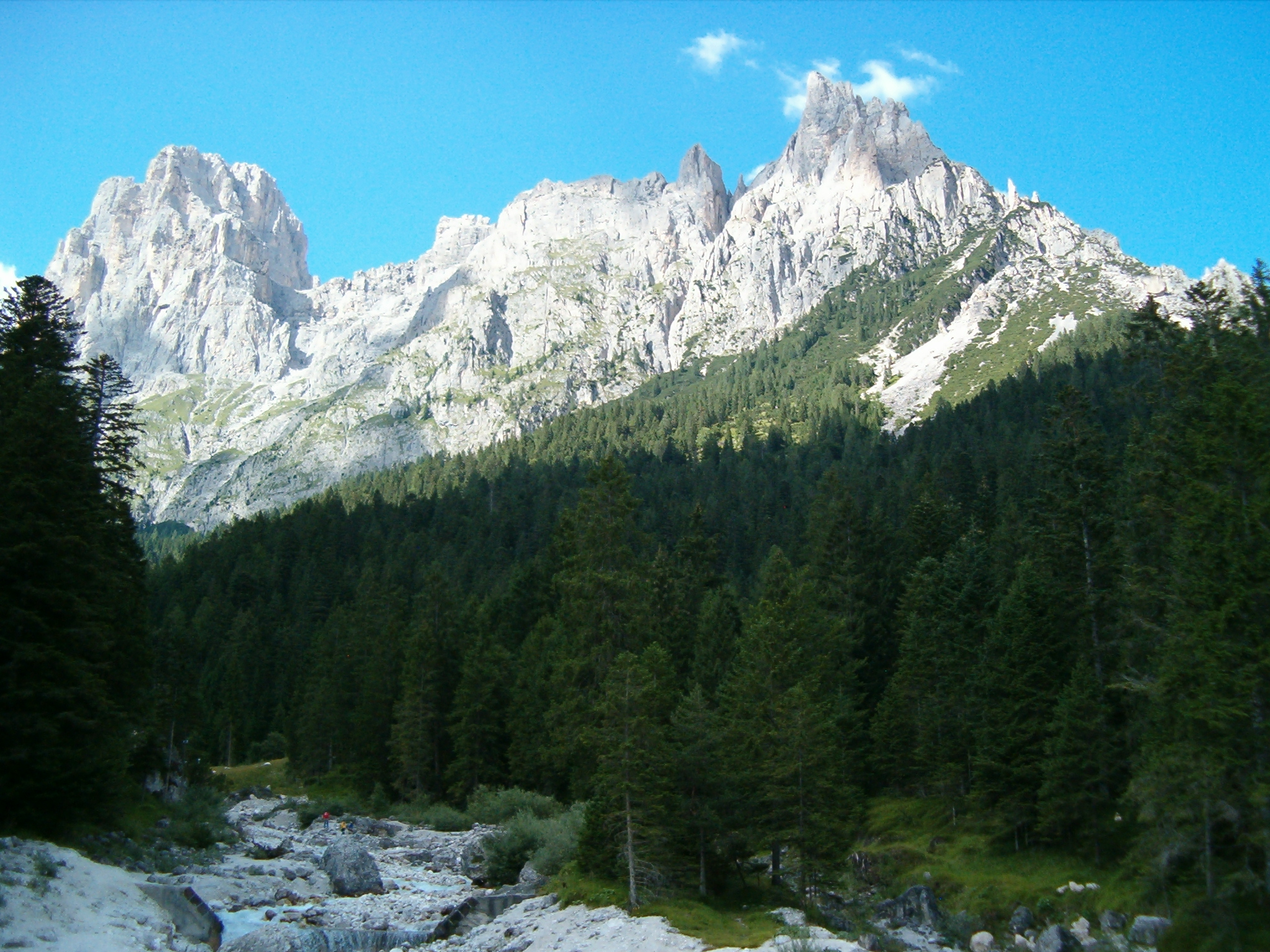
Cima Canali (left), Cima d'Ostio (right)

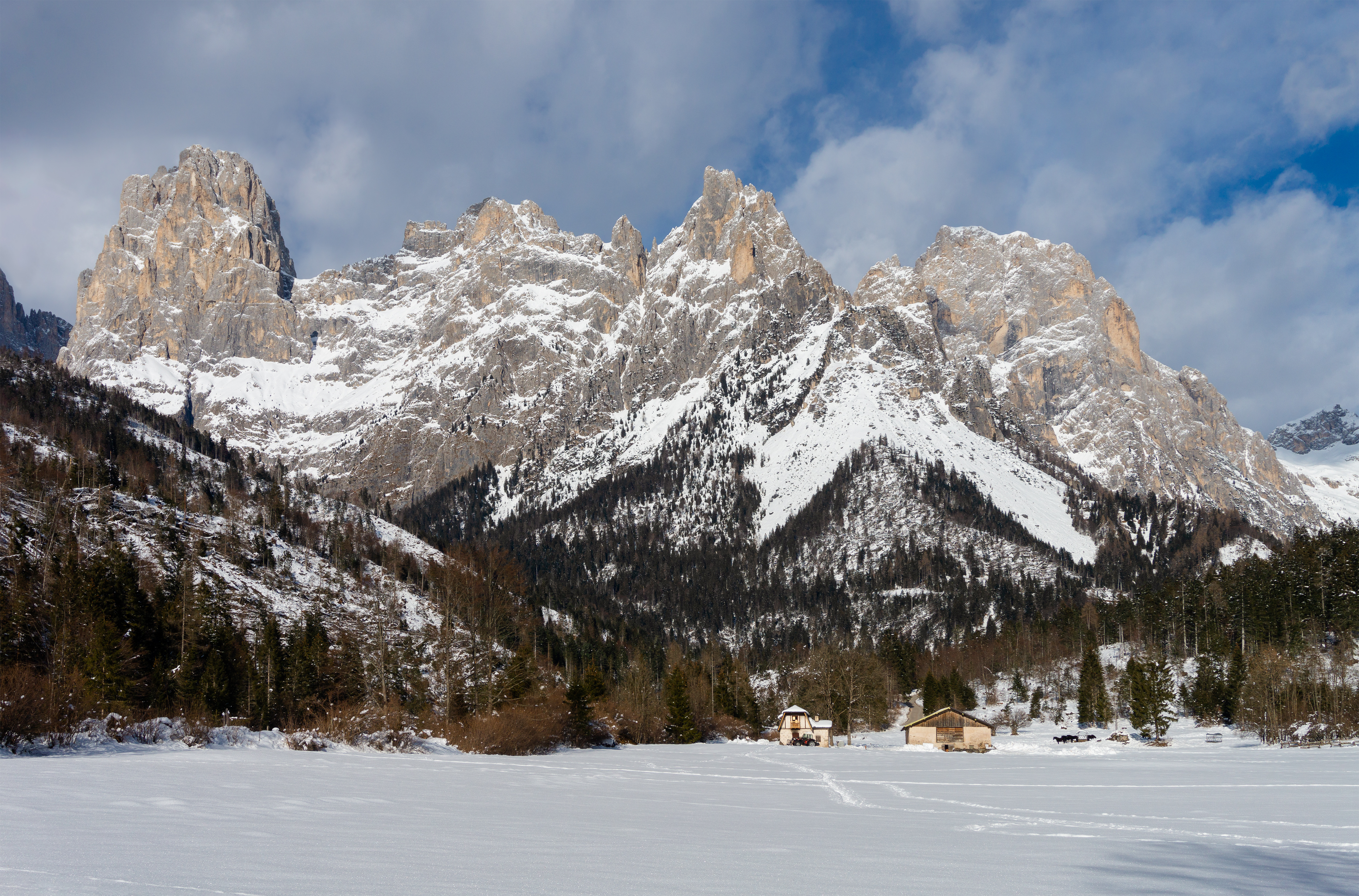
L→R Cima Canali, Sasso delle Lede, Cima d'Ostio, Cima di Lastei

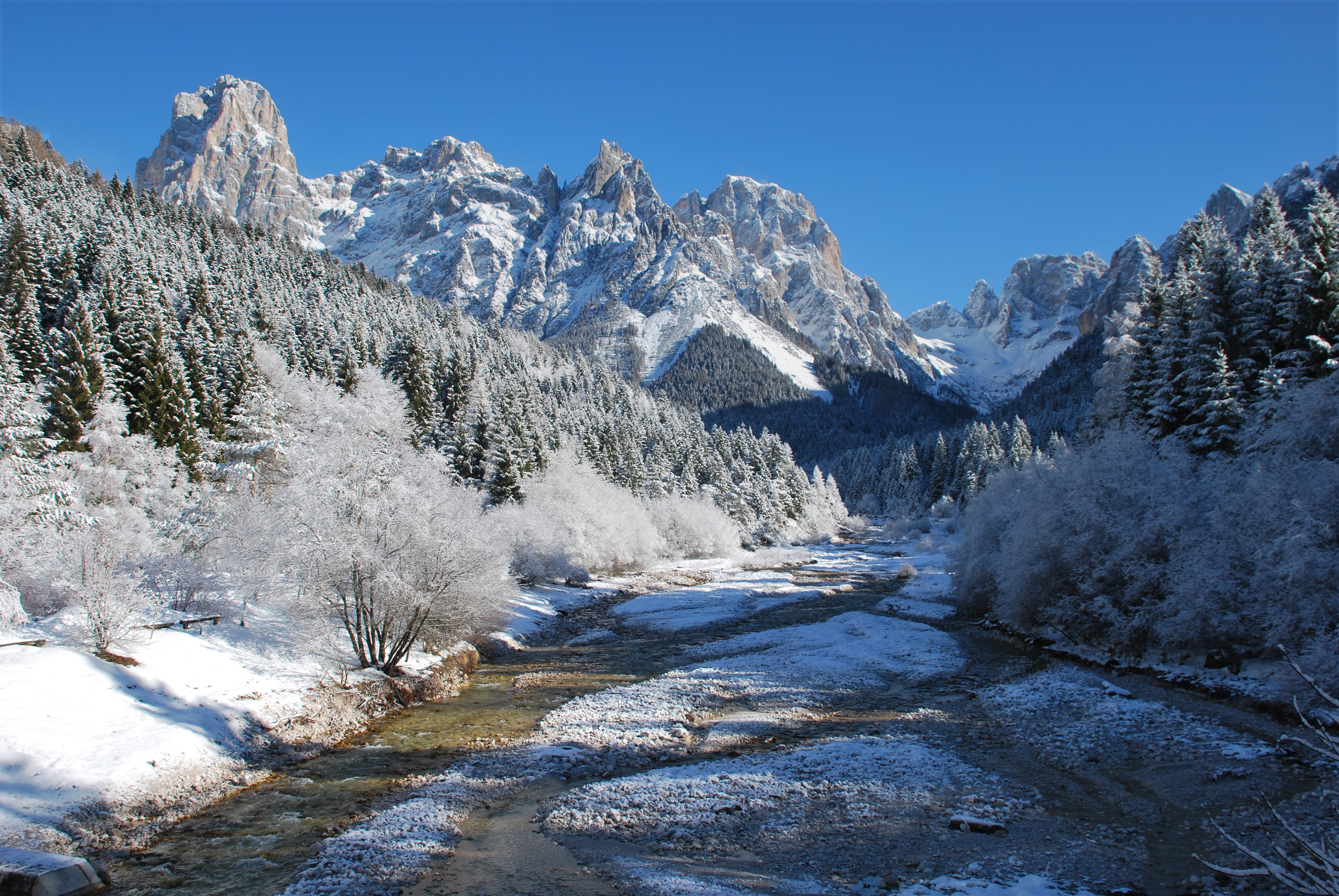
Torrente Canali in Canali Valley.
Cima d'Ostio at center.

== See also ==
- Southern Limestone Alps
