= Cima dei Bureloni =

Mountain in Italy

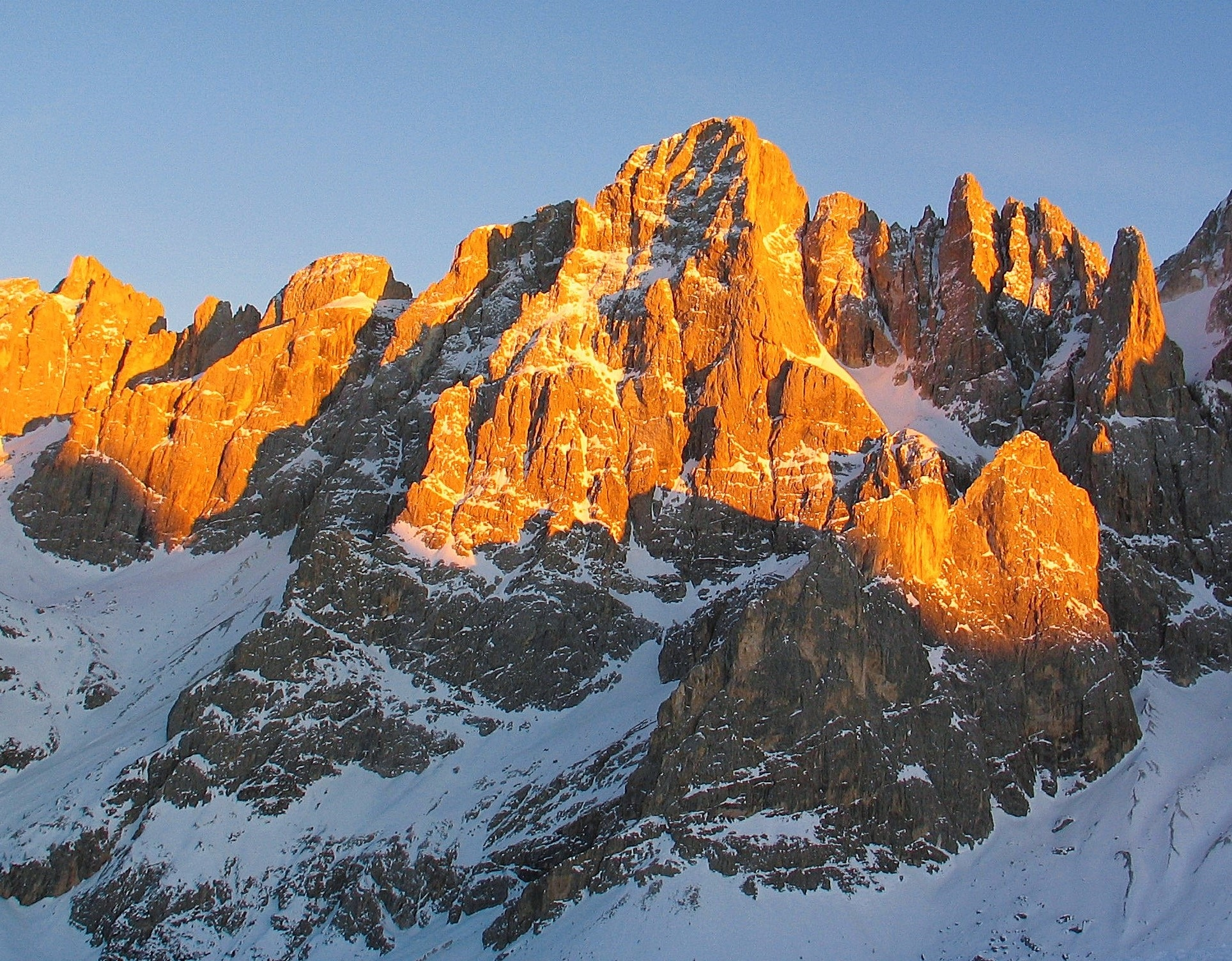
- West aspect at sunset in winter

Highest point
- Elevation: 3,130 m (10,269 ft)
- Prominence: 251 m (823 ft)
- Parent peak: Vezzana
- Isolation: 0.86 km (0.53 mi)
- Coordinates: 46°17′49″N 11°49′58″E

Geography
- Location within Italy
- Country: Italy
- Province: Trentino / Belluno
- Protected area: Paneveggio-Pale di San Martino Natural Park
- Parent range: Dolomites; Pale di San Martino
- Topo map: Tabacco Maps Pale di San Martino

Geology
- Rock age: Triassic
- Rock type: Dolomite

Climbing
- First ascent: 1888
- Easiest route: Northeast slope

Cima dei Bureloni is a mountain on the common boundary shared by the provinces of Trentino and Belluno in northern Italy.

== Description ==
Cima dei Bureloni is a 3,130-meter-elevation (10,269-foot) summit in the Pale di San Martino group of the Dolomites. The peak is located 4 kilometres (2.5 mi) northeast of San Martino di Castrozza mountain resort, and the peak is the third-highest within Paneveggio-Pale di San Martino Natural Park, a UNESCO World Heritage Site. Precipitation runoff from the mountain's west slope drains into Torrente Travignolo, which is a tributary of the Avisio, whereas the east slope drains into tributaries of the Piave. Topographic relief is significant as the summit rises approximately 1,300 metres (4,300 ft) above the Comelle Valley in 2 kilometres (1.2 mi), and 530 metres (1,740 ft) above Bivacco Giorgio Brunner in 0.5 kilometres (0.31 mi). The nearest higher neighbor is Vezzana, 0.8 kilometres (0.50 mi) to the south. The mountain's toponym derives from the dialect word "burel", meaning ravine or steep gully, which refers to the slopes of this peak. The first ascent of the summit was made on July 26, 1888, by L. Darmstädter, R. Kramer, L. Stabeler, and C. Bernard via a gully on the southeast aspect.

== Climate ==
Based on the Köppen climate classification, Cima dei Bureloni is located in an alpine climate zone with long, cold winters, and short, mild summers. Weather systems are forced upward by the mountains (orographic lift), causing moisture to drop in the form of rain and snow. The months of June through September offer the most favorable weather for visiting or climbing in this area.

== Gallery ==
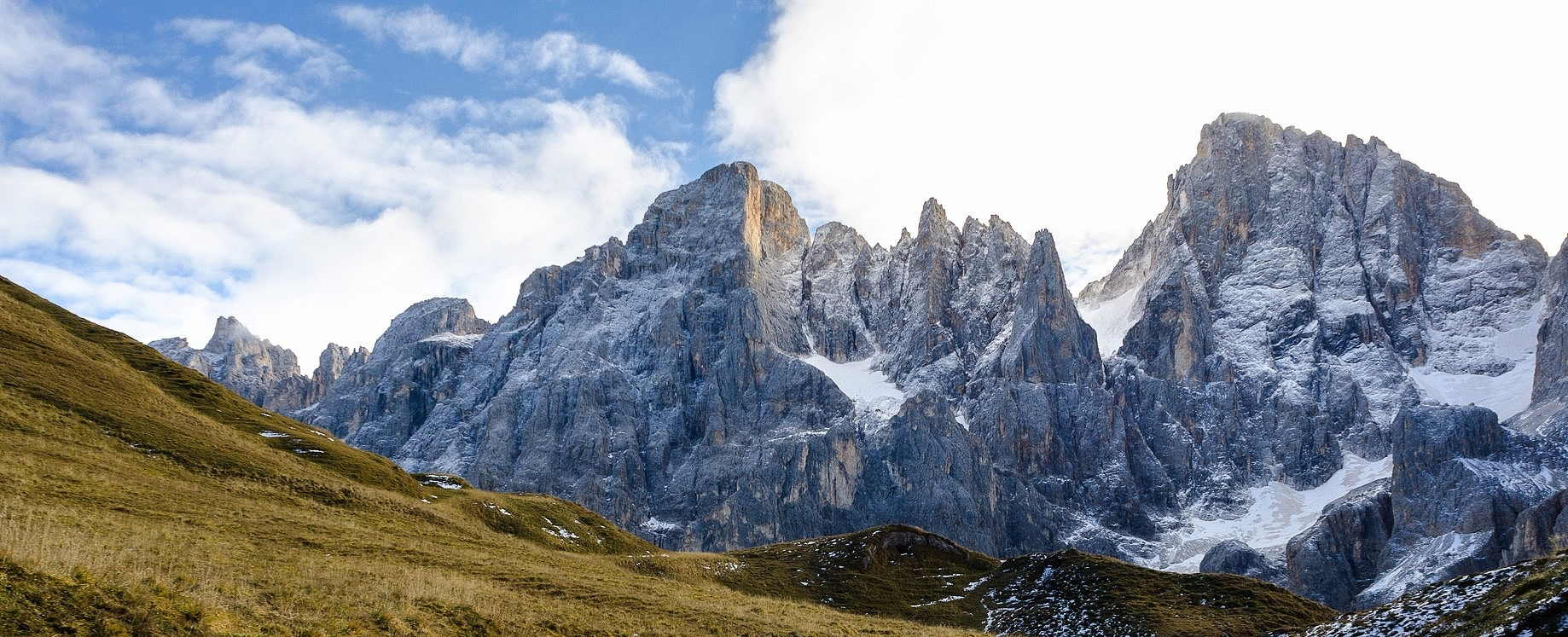
Cima dei Bureloni centered with Vezzana to right

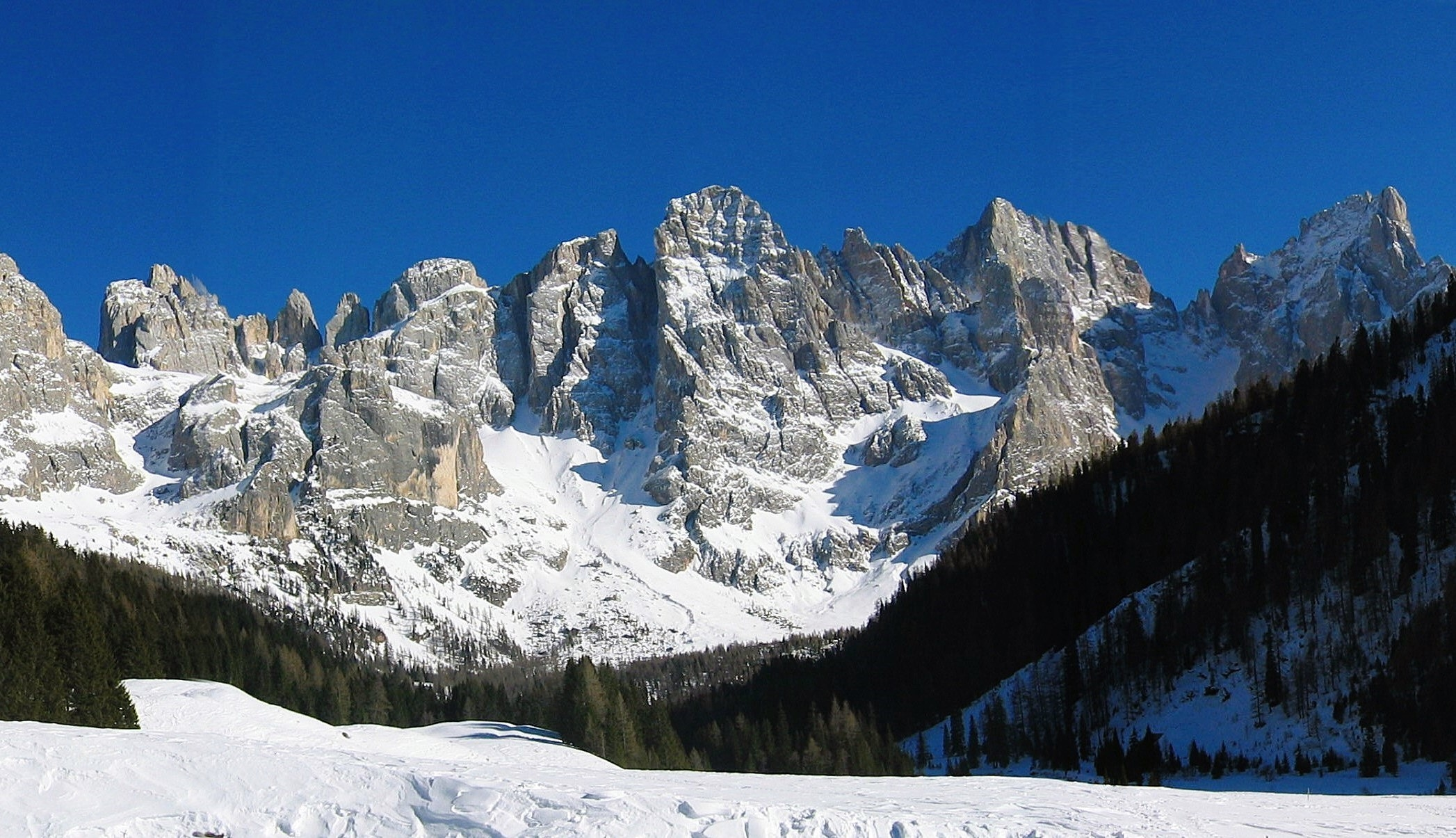
Cima dei Bureloni centered

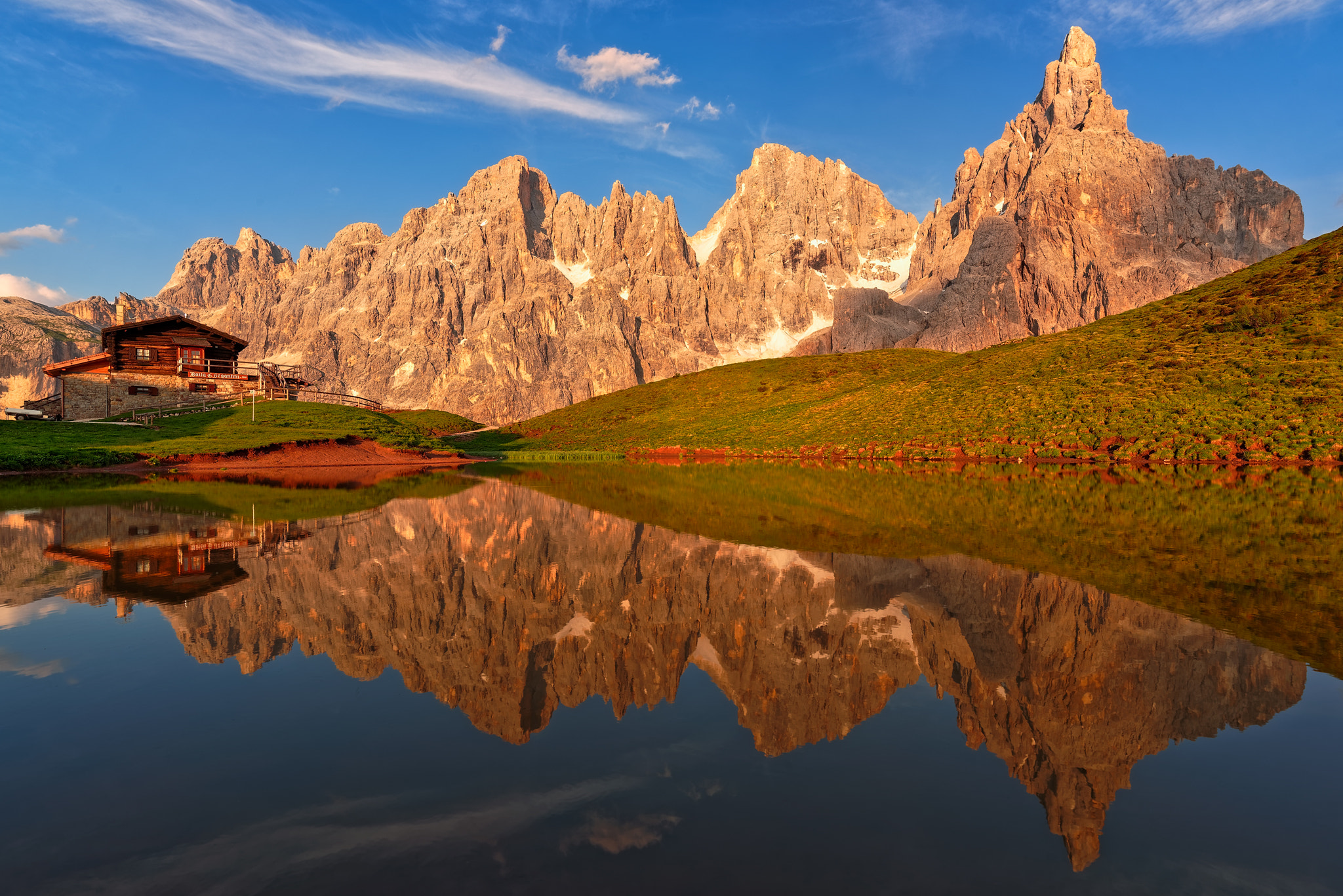
Cima dei Bureloni, Vezzana, and Cimon della Pala

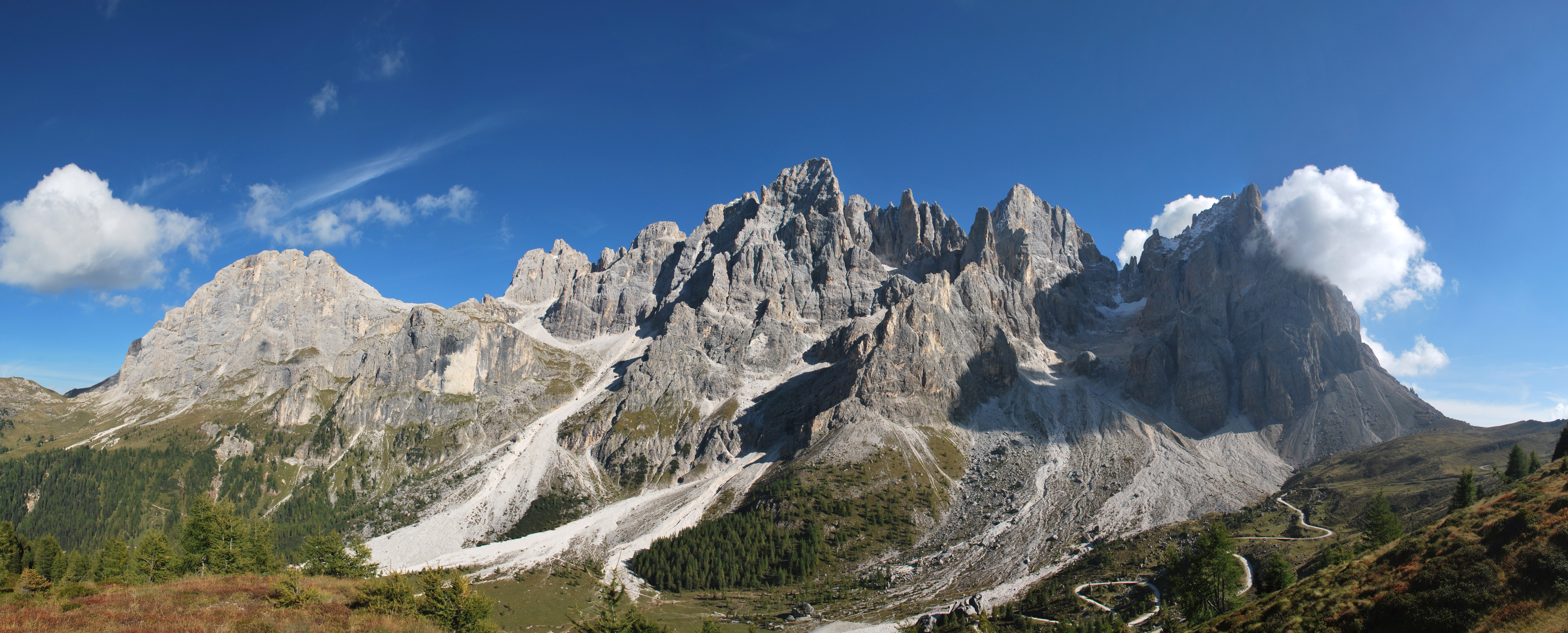
Cima dei Bureloni centered

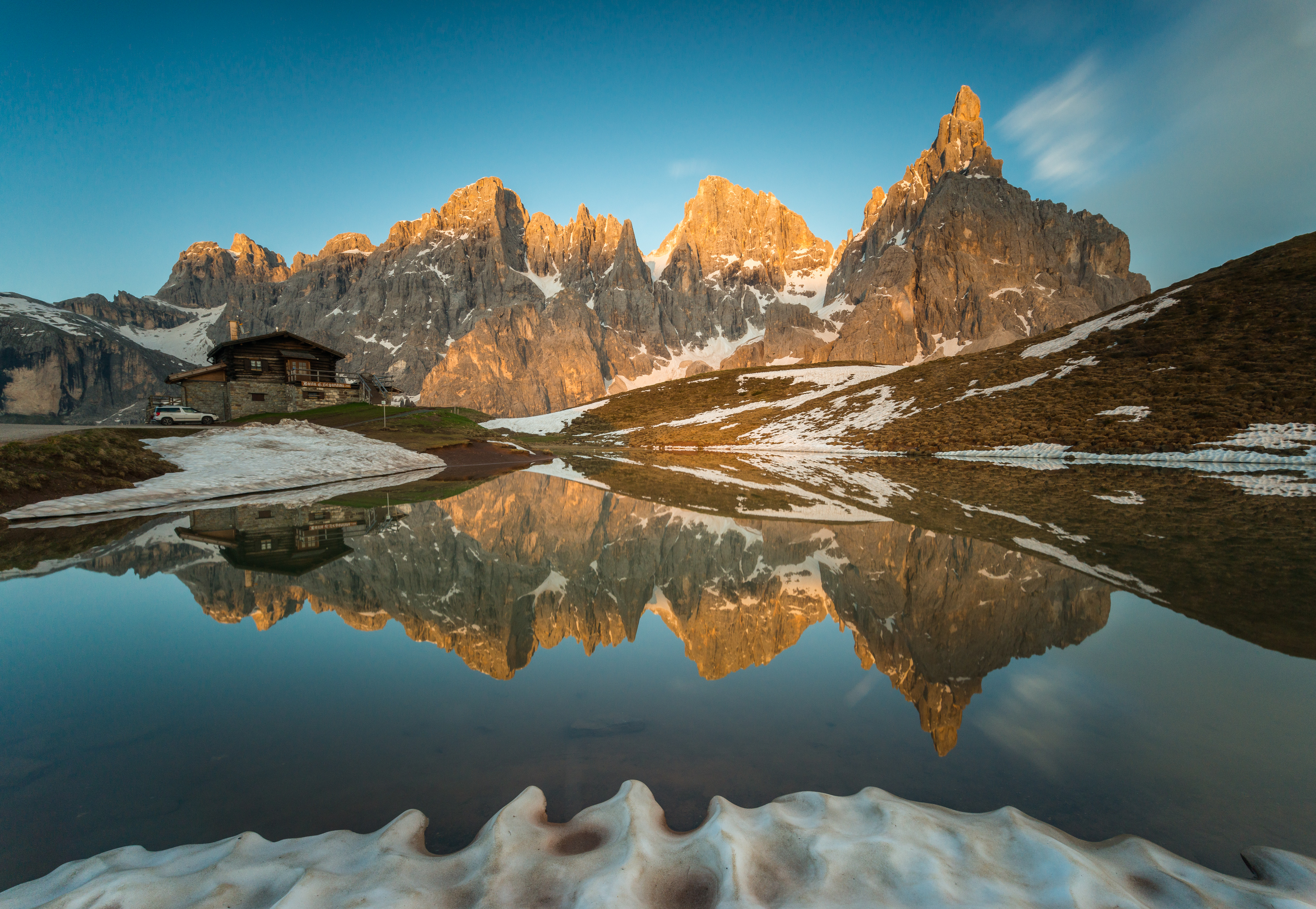
Bureloni, Vezzana, and Cimon della Pala

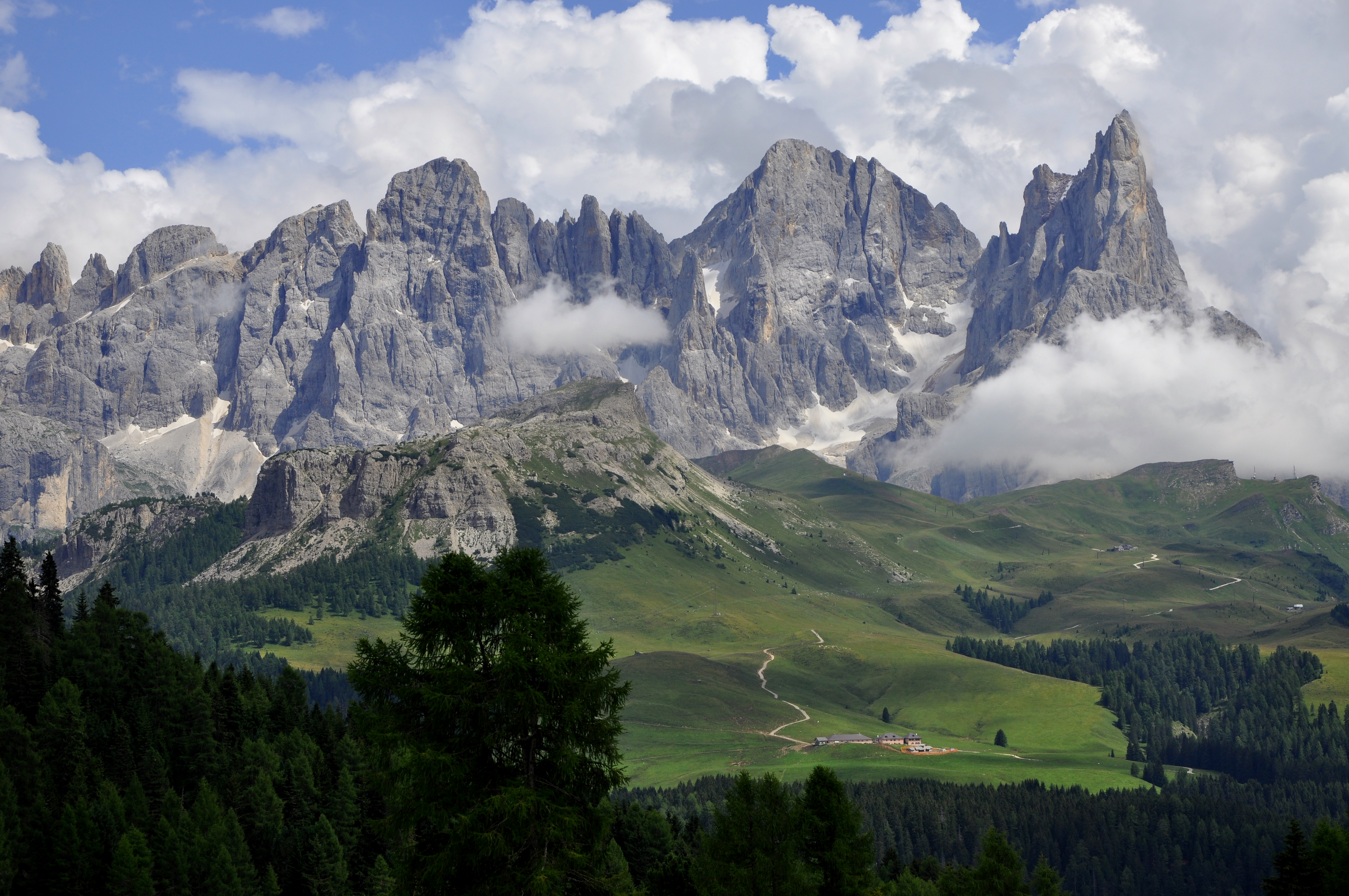
Bureloni, Vezzana, and Cimon della Pala

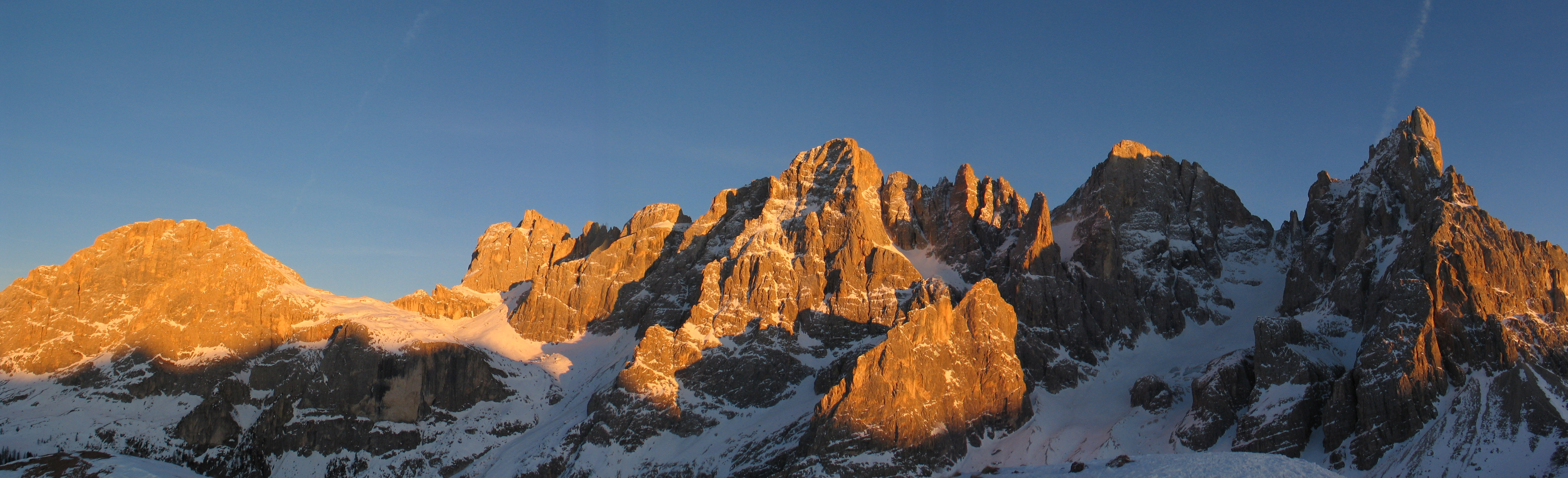
Cima dei Bureloni centered

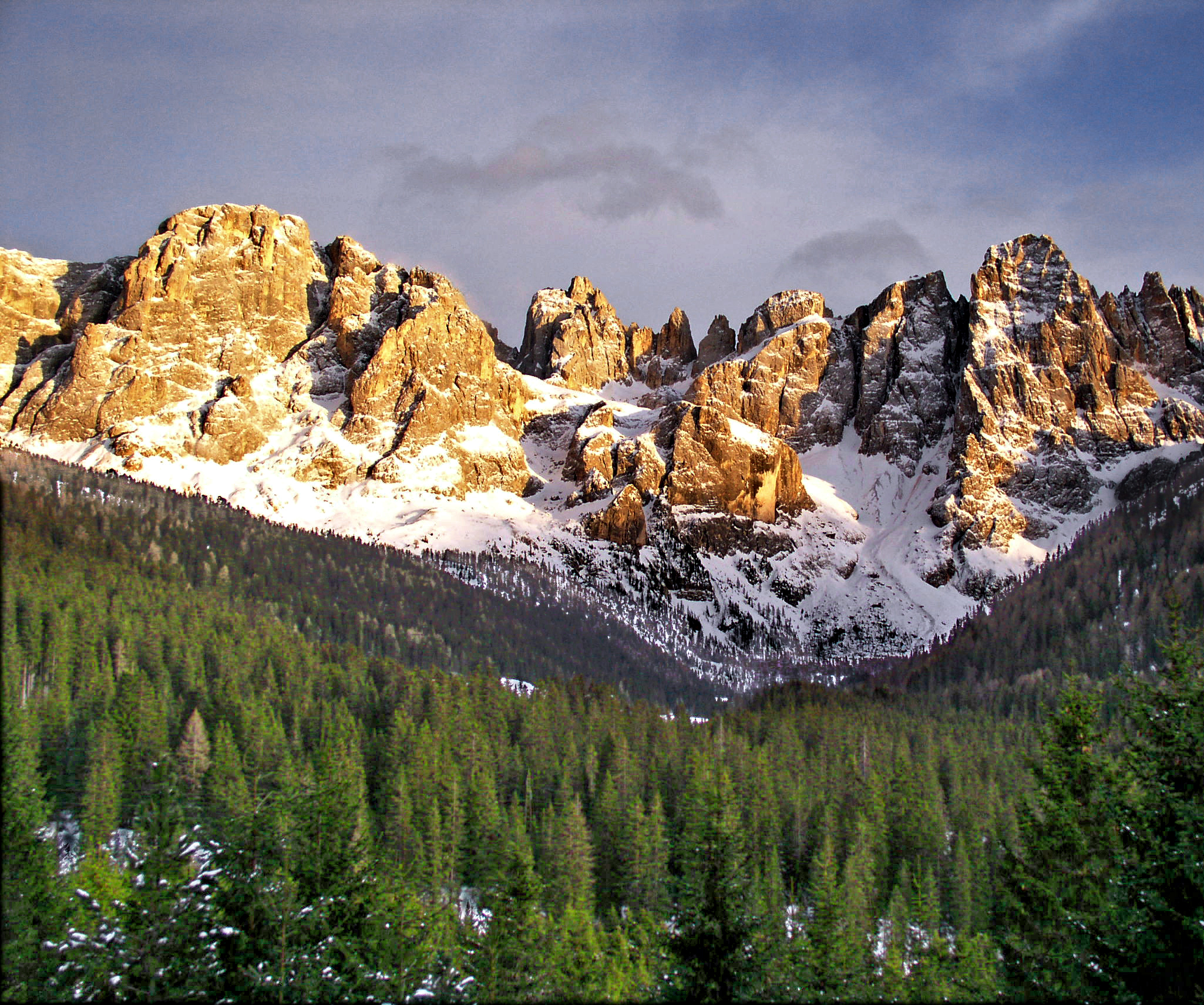
Cima dei Bureloni to the right

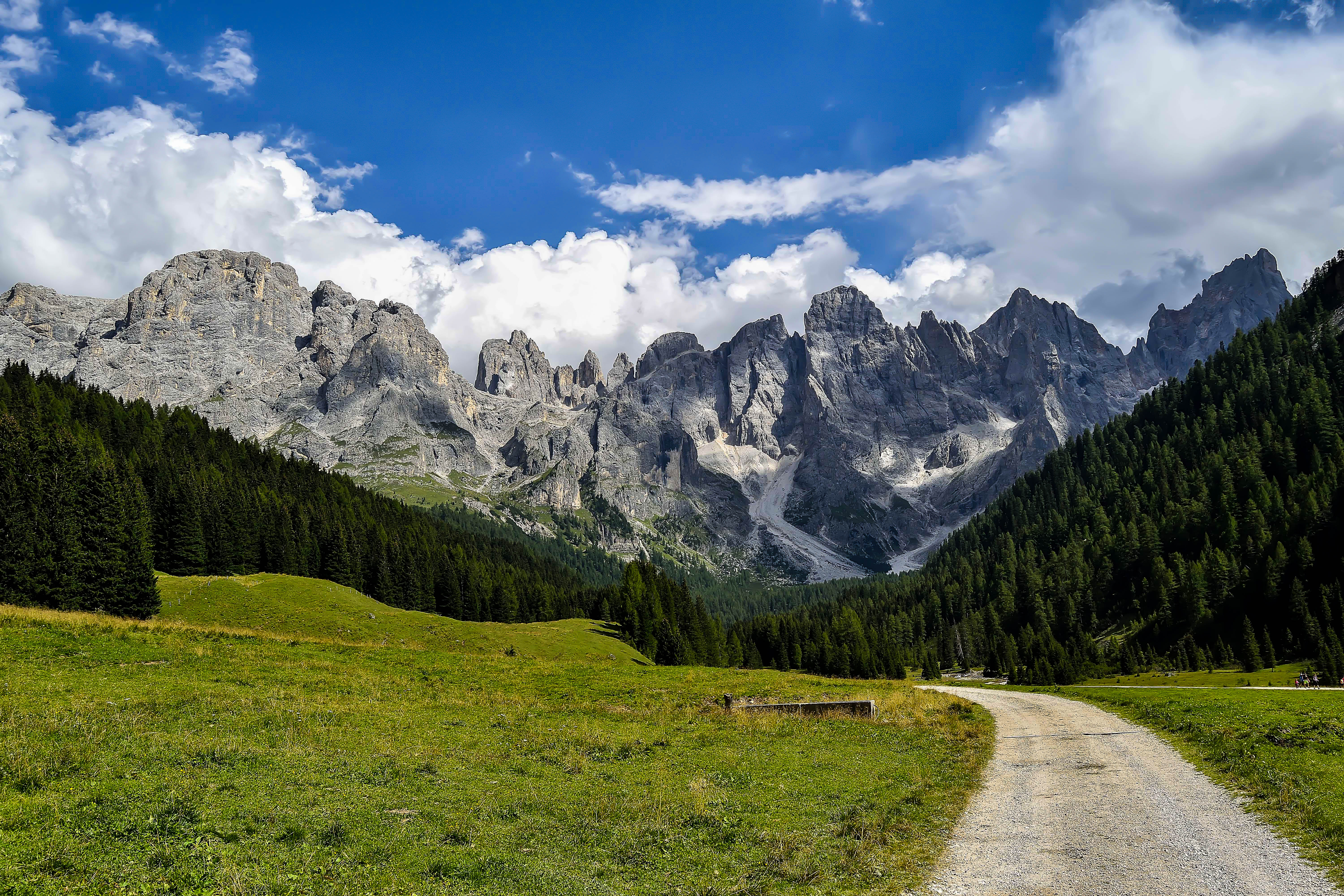
Cima dei Bureloni right of center

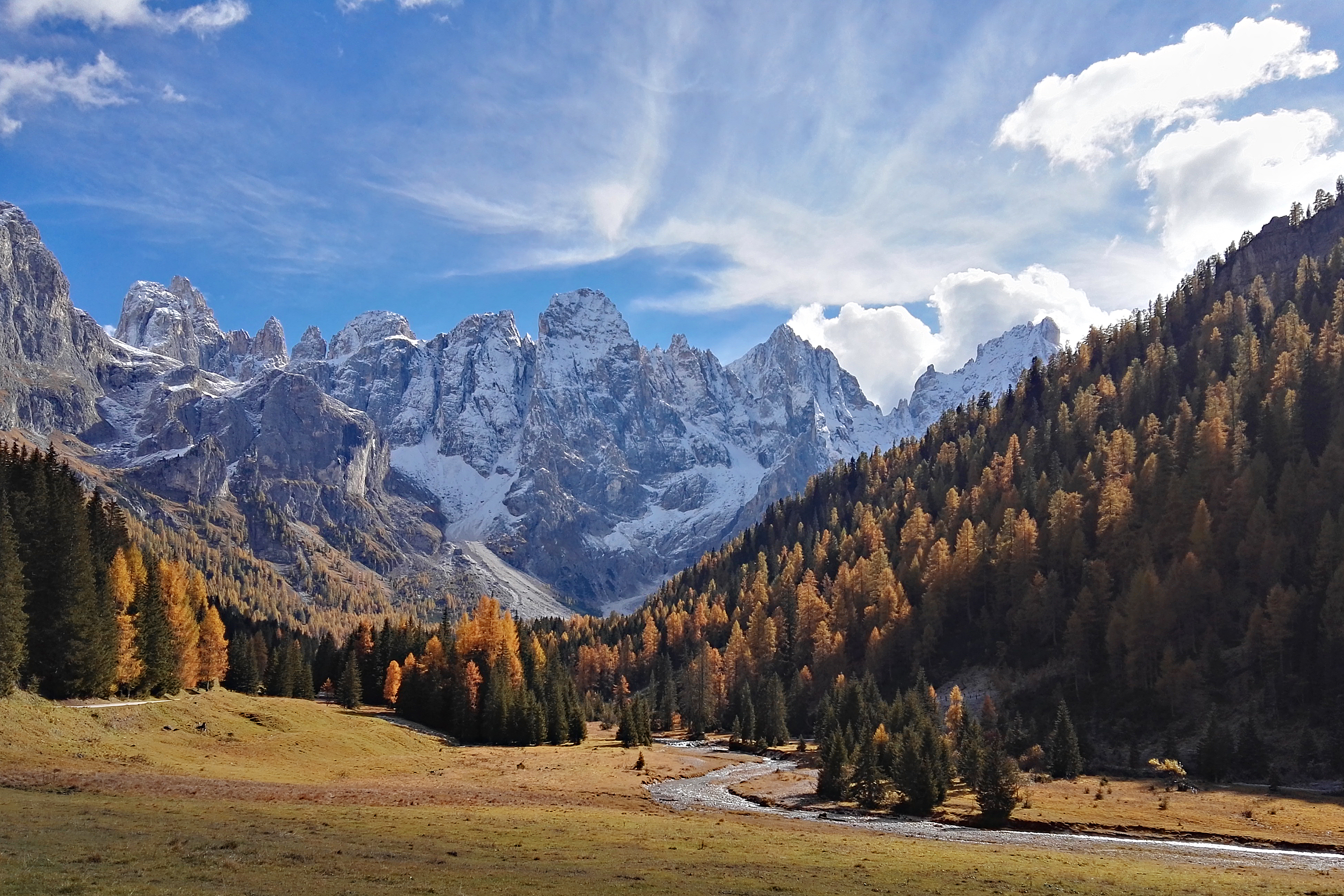
Cima dei Bureloni left of center

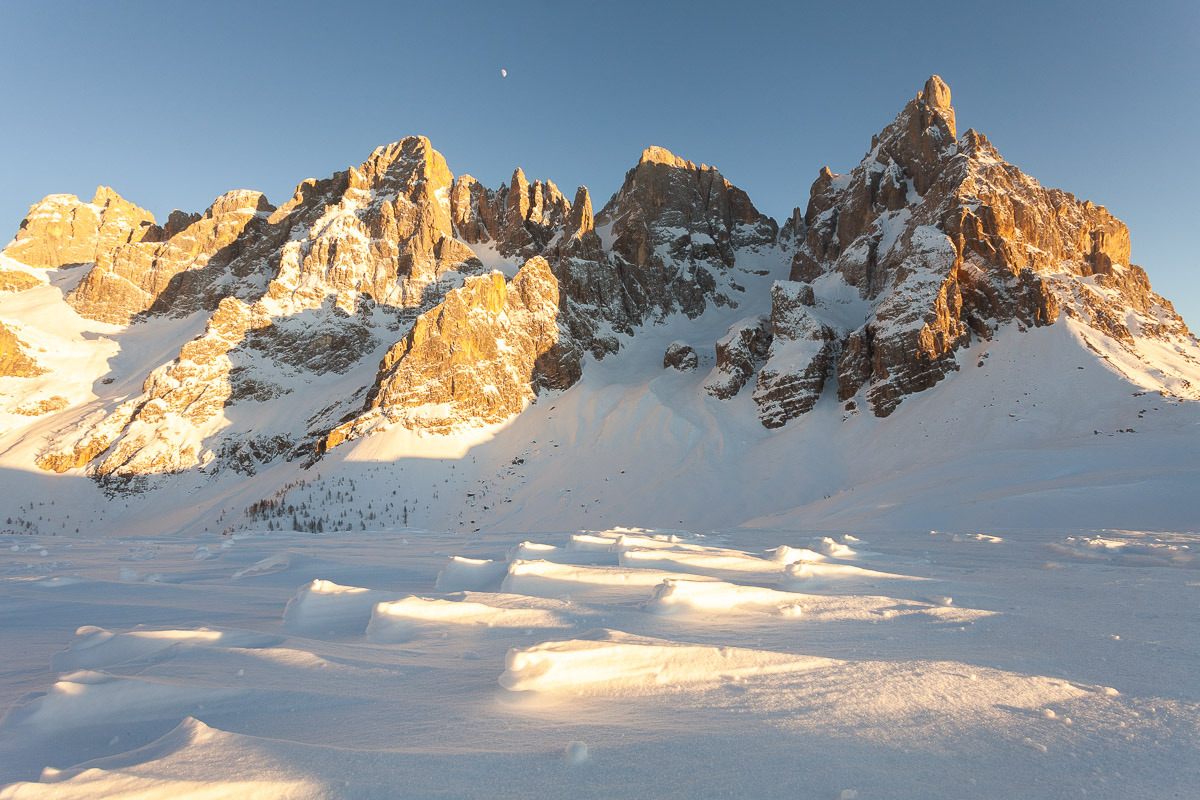
Cima dei Bureloni, Vezzana, and Cimon della Pala

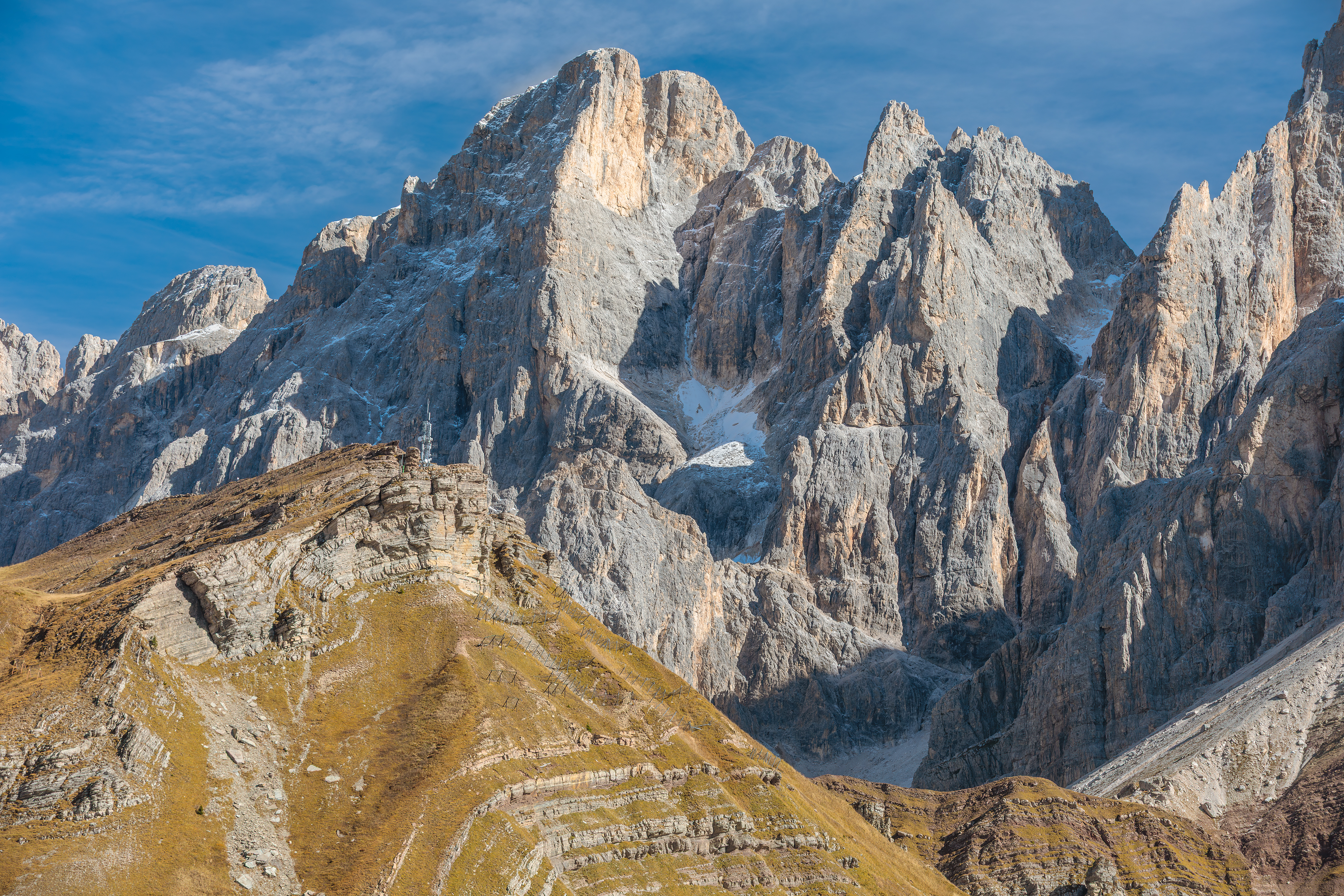
Cima dei Bureloni and Campanile di Val Strut

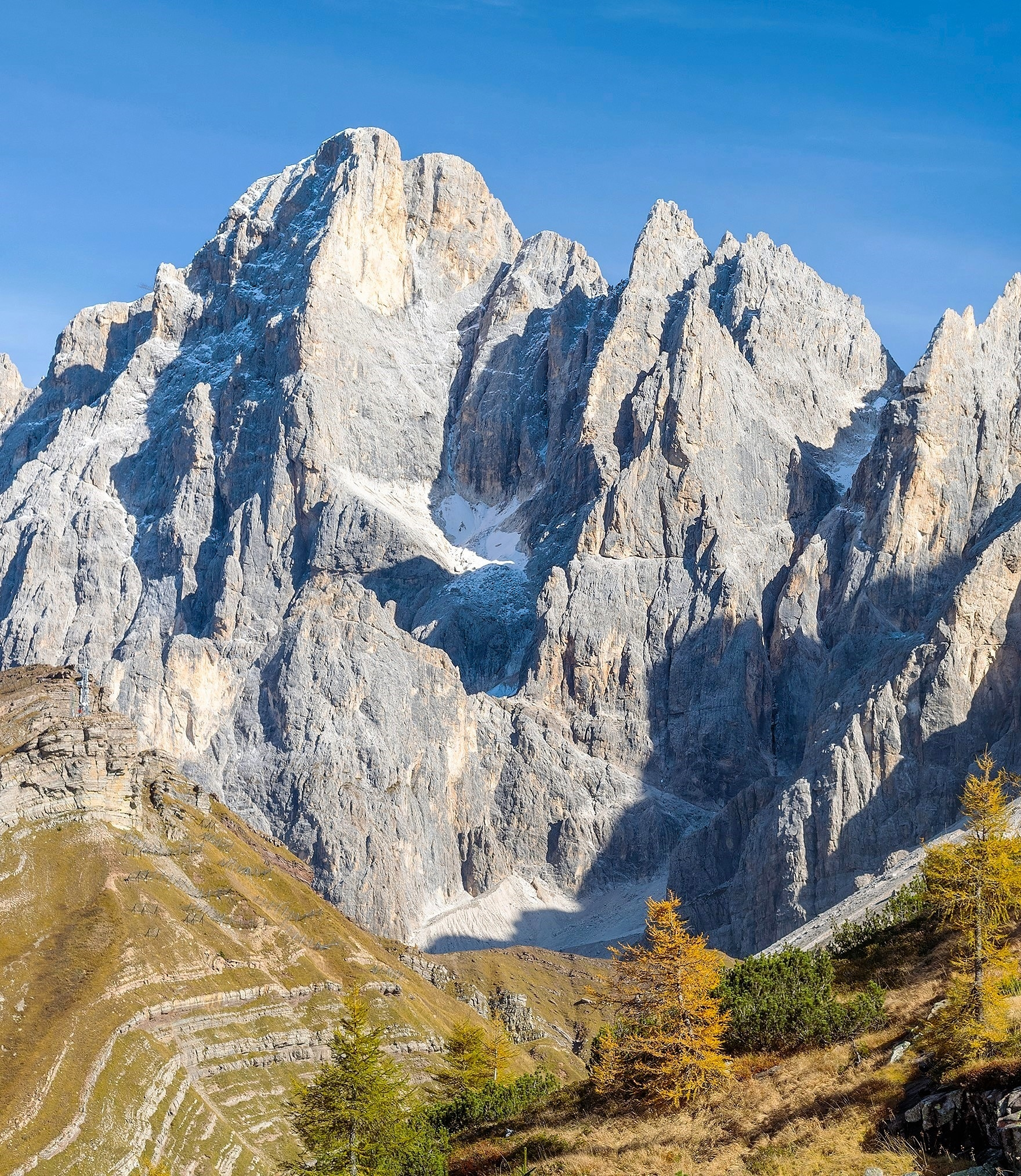
Cima dei Bureloni and Campanile di Val Strut

== See also ==
- Southern Limestone Alps
