= Monte Castellaz =

Mountain in Italy

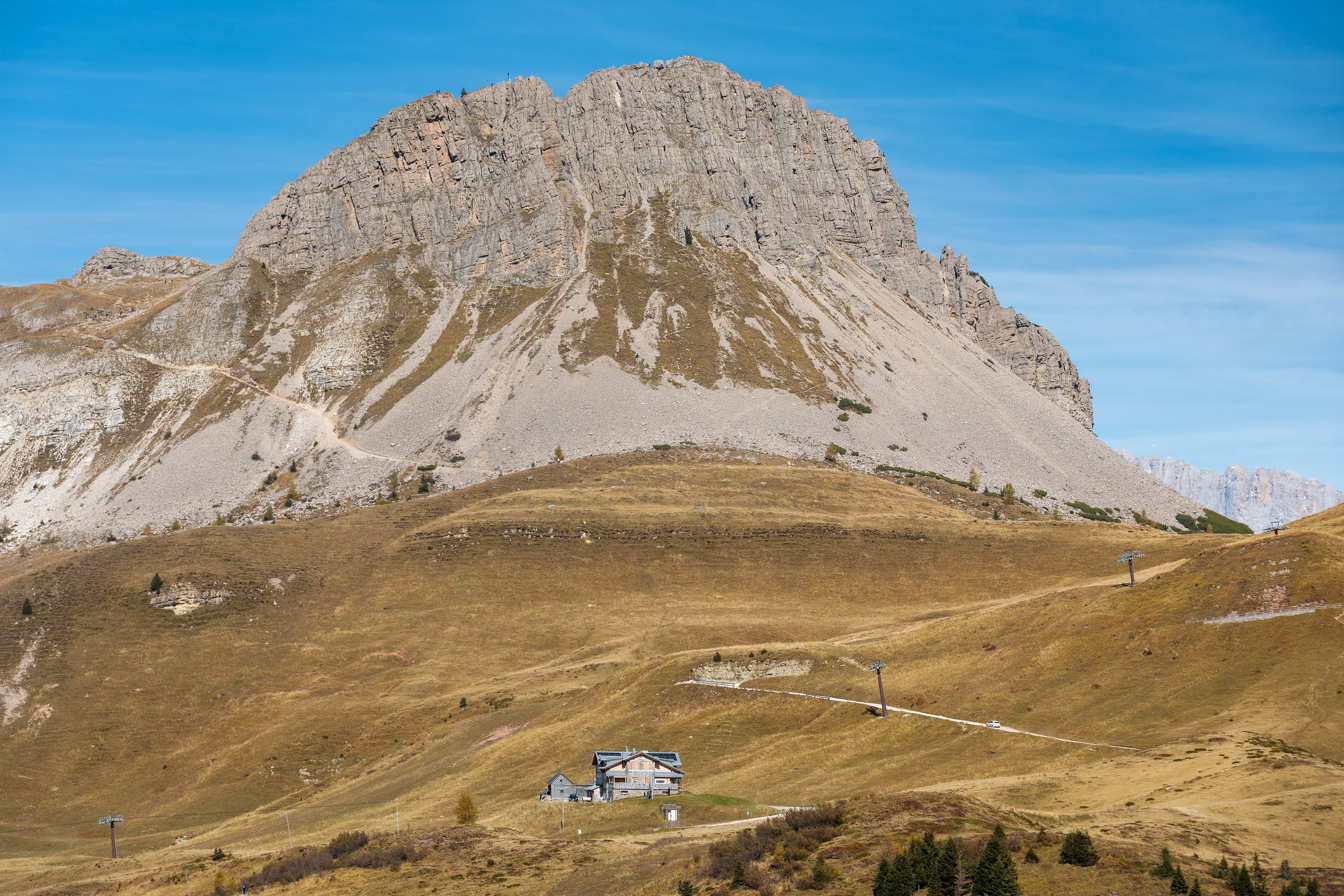
- South aspect

Highest point
- Elevation: 2,333 m (7,654 ft)
- Prominence: 176 m (577 ft)
- Parent peak: Vezzana
- Isolation: 2.4 km (1.5 mi)
- Coordinates: 46°18′26″N 11°47′43″E

Geography
- Location within Italy
- Country: Italy
- Province: Trentino
- Protected area: Paneveggio-Pale di San Martino Natural Park
- Parent range: Dolomites; Pale di San Martino
- Topo map: Tabacco 22 Pale di San Martino

Geology
- Rock age: Triassic
- Rock type: Dolomite

Climbing
- Easiest route: Trail

Monte Castellaz is a mountain in the province of Trentino in northern Italy.

== Description ==
Monte Castellaz, labeled as Castellazzo on the official IGM map, is a 2,333-meter-elevation (7,654-foot) summit in the Pale di San Martino group of the Dolomites. The peak is located five kilometers (3.1 miles) north of San Martino di Castrozza mountain resort, and the peak is within Paneveggio-Pale di San Martino Natural Park, a UNESCO World Heritage Site. Precipitation runoff from the mountain's slopes drains chiefly into Torrente Travignolo which is a tributary of the Avisio. Topographic relief is significant as the summit rises approximately 570 meters (1,870 feet) above the Travignolo Valley in one kilometer (0.6 mile). The nearest higher neighbor is Cima Silvano, 2.4 kilometers (1.5 miles) to the southeast. During World War I, its position overlooking Rolle Pass made Monte Castellaz a key military outpost to control the surrounding valleys. The "Cristo Pensante" (Thinking Christ) statue at the summit honors soldiers who fought in that war.

== Climate ==
Based on the Köppen climate classification, Monte Castellaz is located in an alpine climate zone with long, cold winters, and short, mild summers. Weather systems are forced upward by the mountains (orographic lift), causing moisture to drop in the form of rain and snow. The months of June through September offer the most favorable weather for visiting or climbing in this area.

== Gallery ==
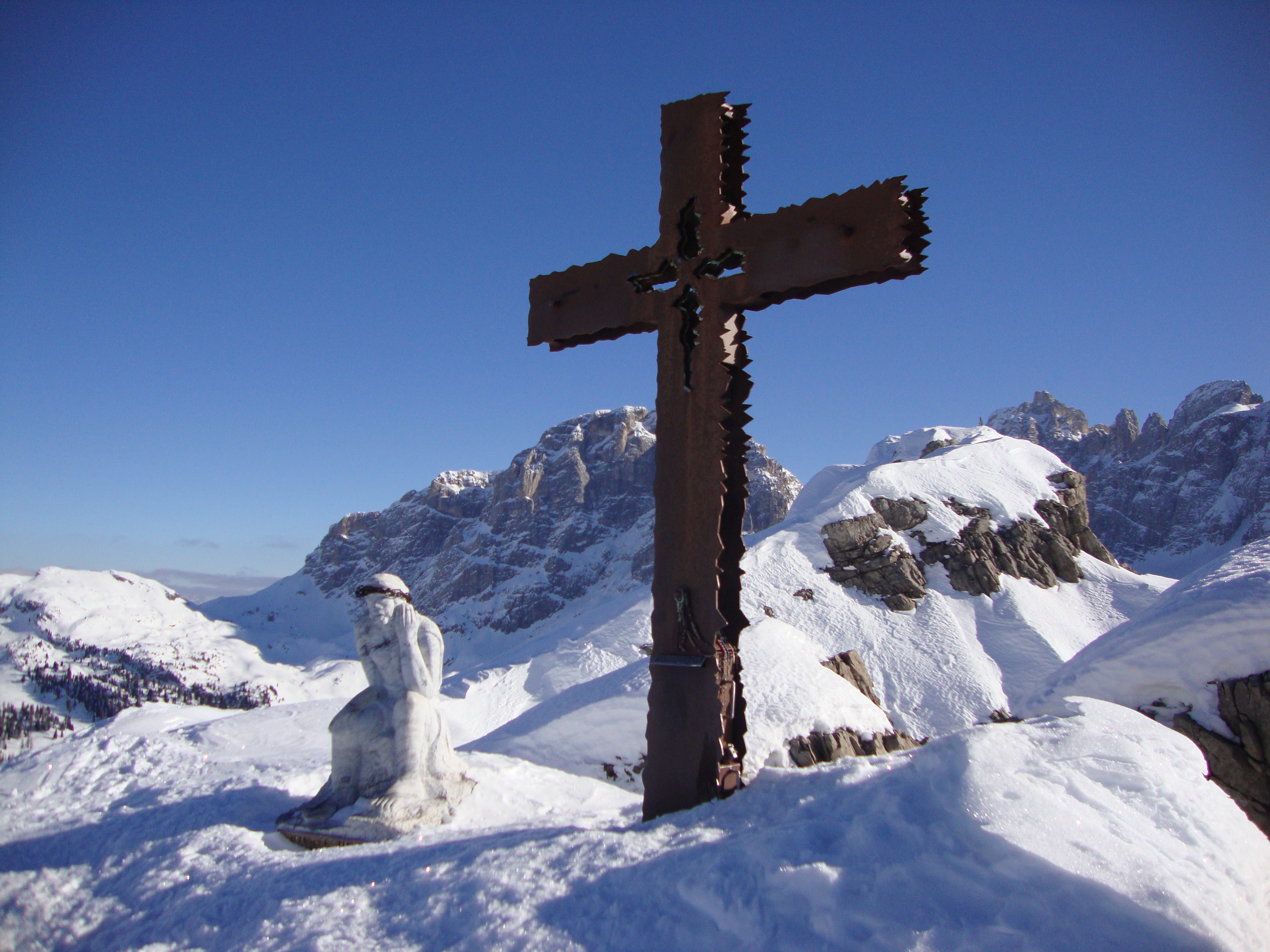
Cross and Cristo Pensante statue on summit

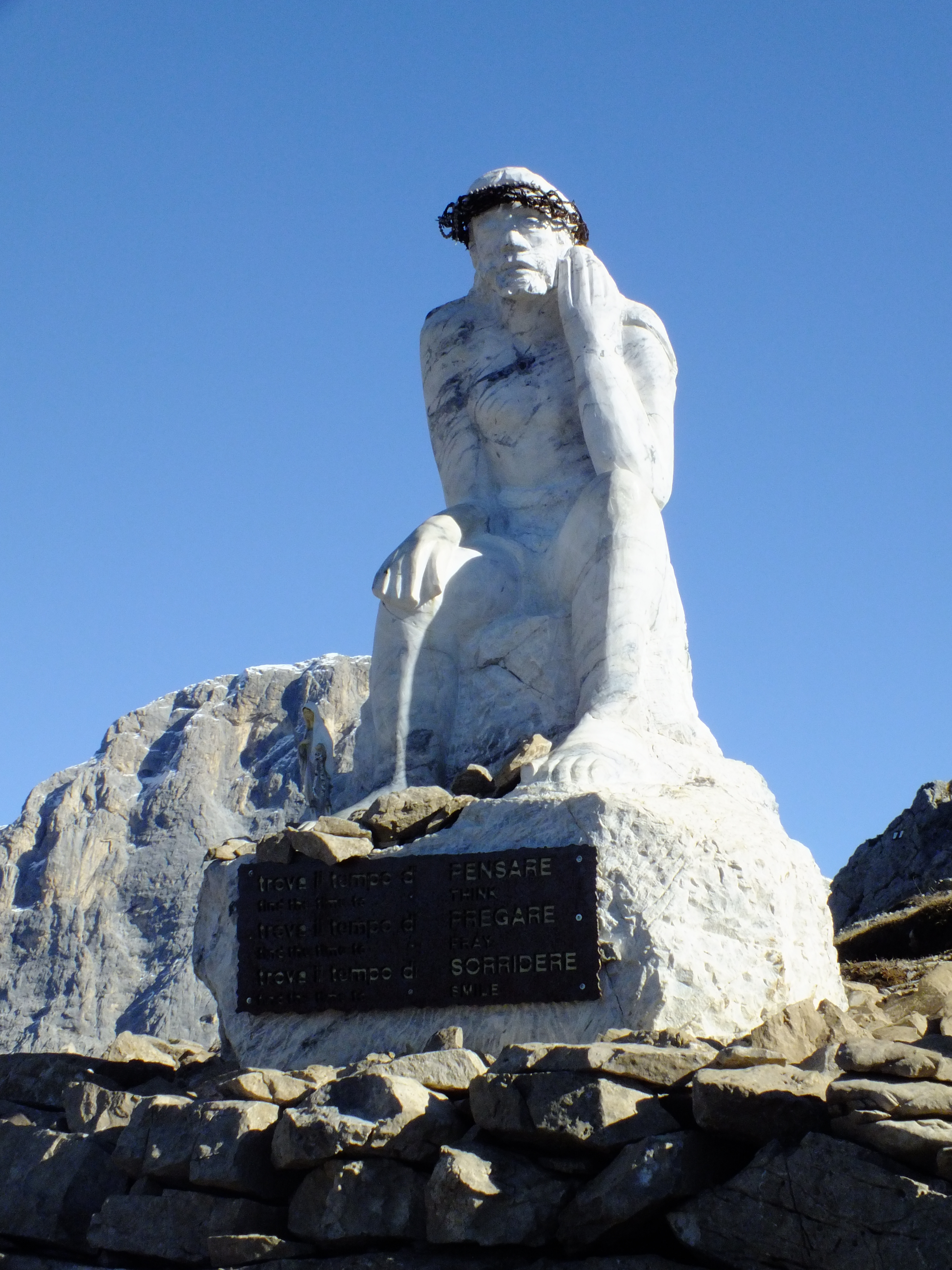
Cristo Pensante statue on summit

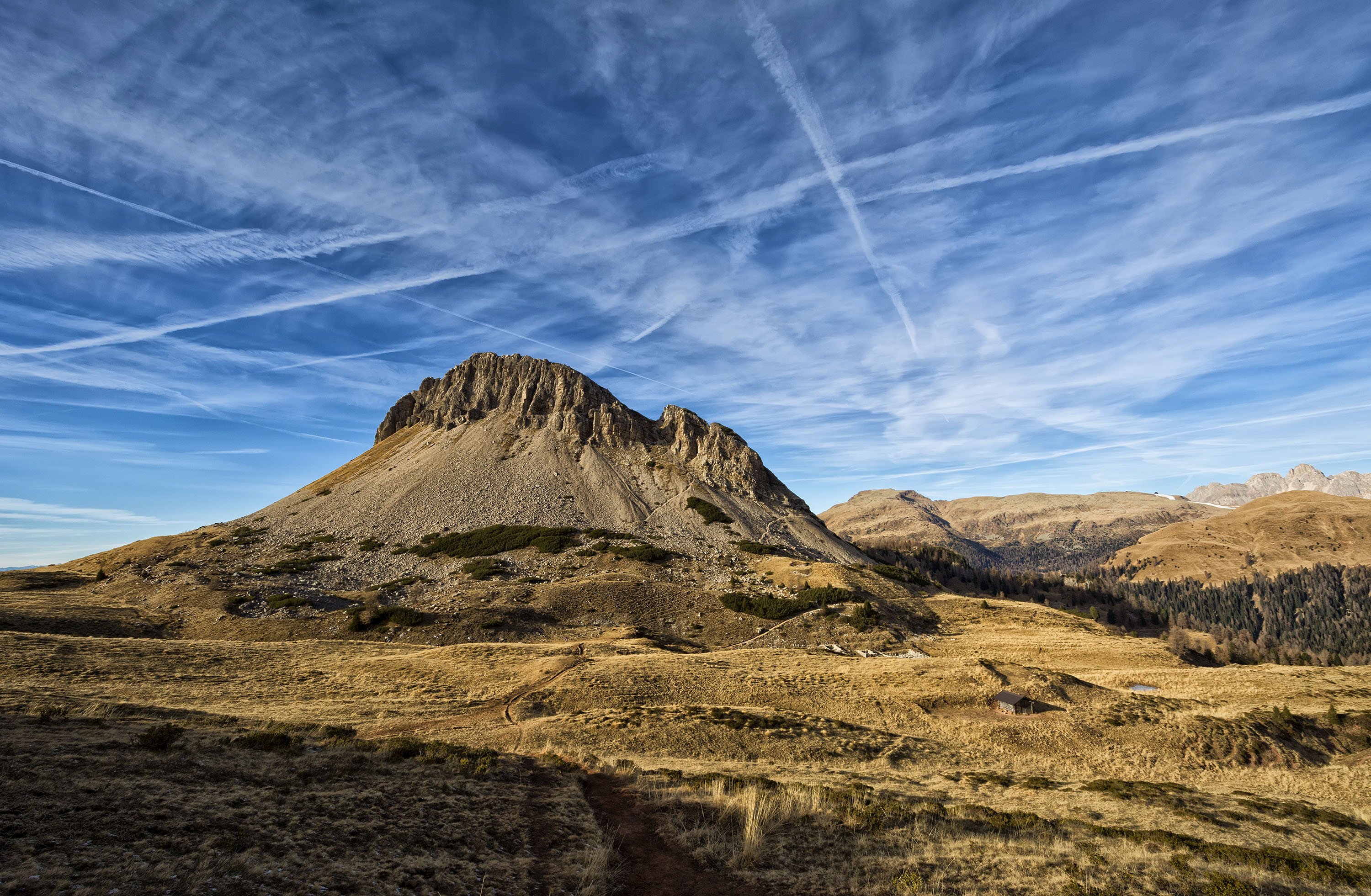
East aspect

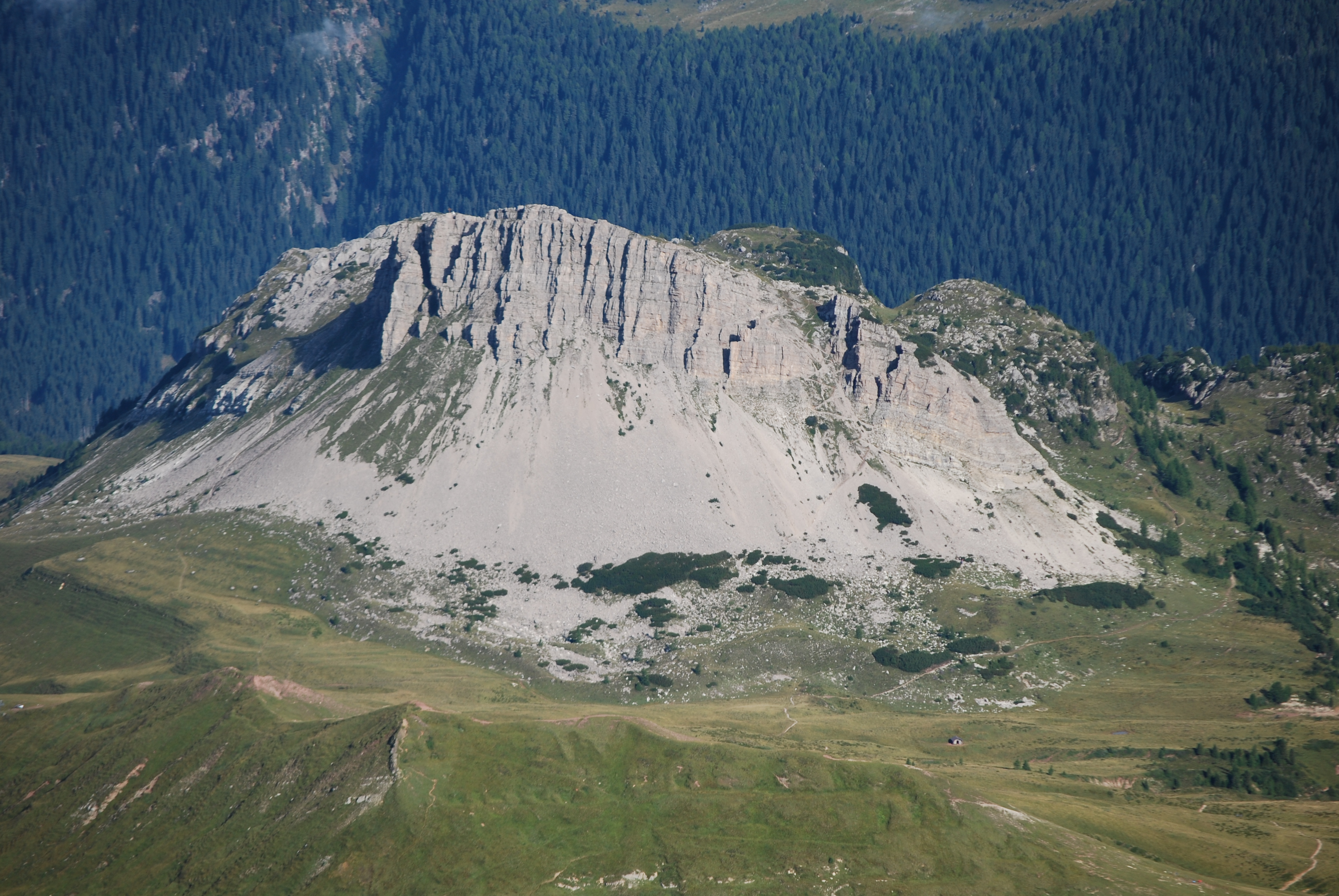
Southeast aspect

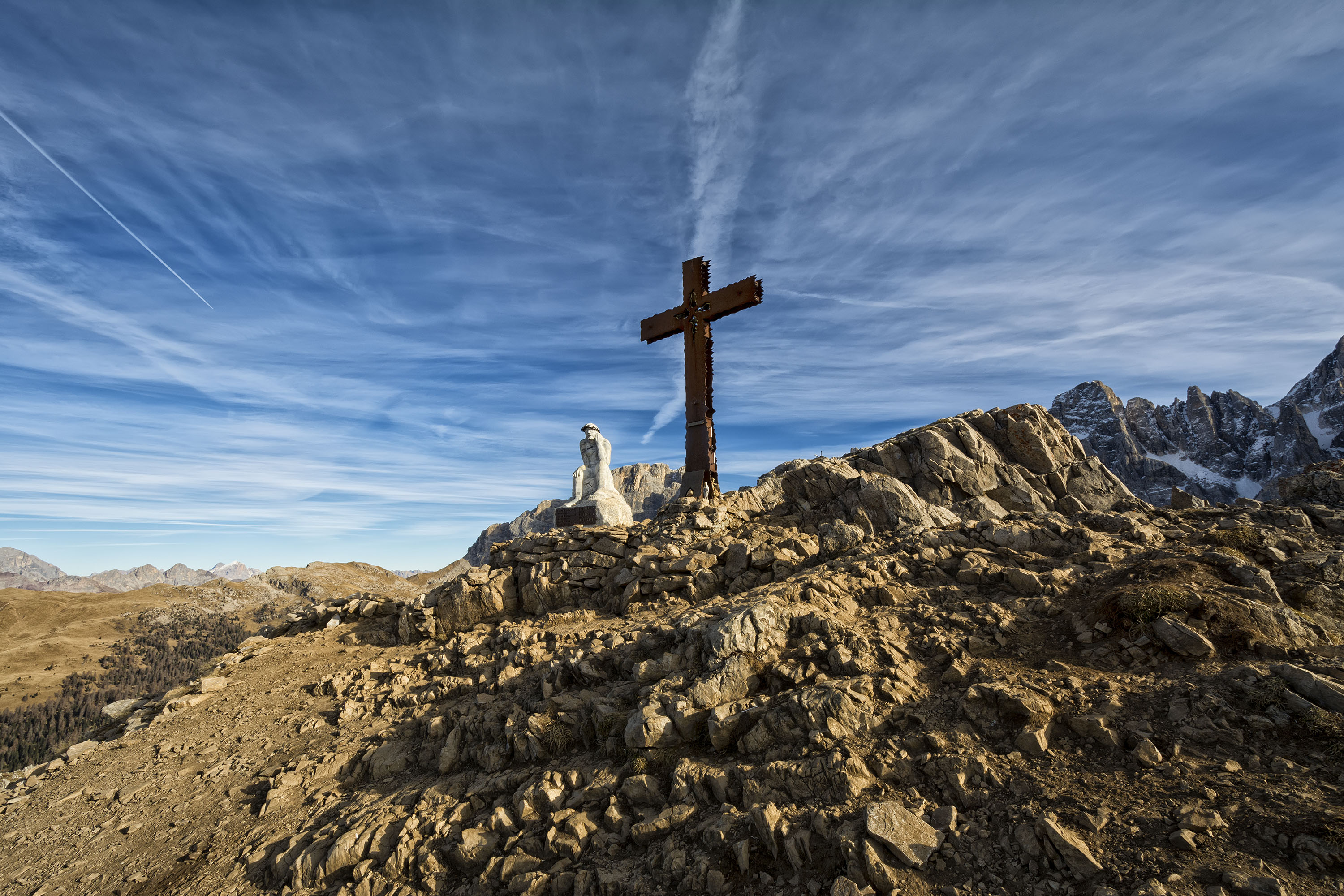
Summit

== See also ==
- Southern Limestone Alps
