= Cima di Lastei =

Mountain in Italy

- Cima di Lastéi
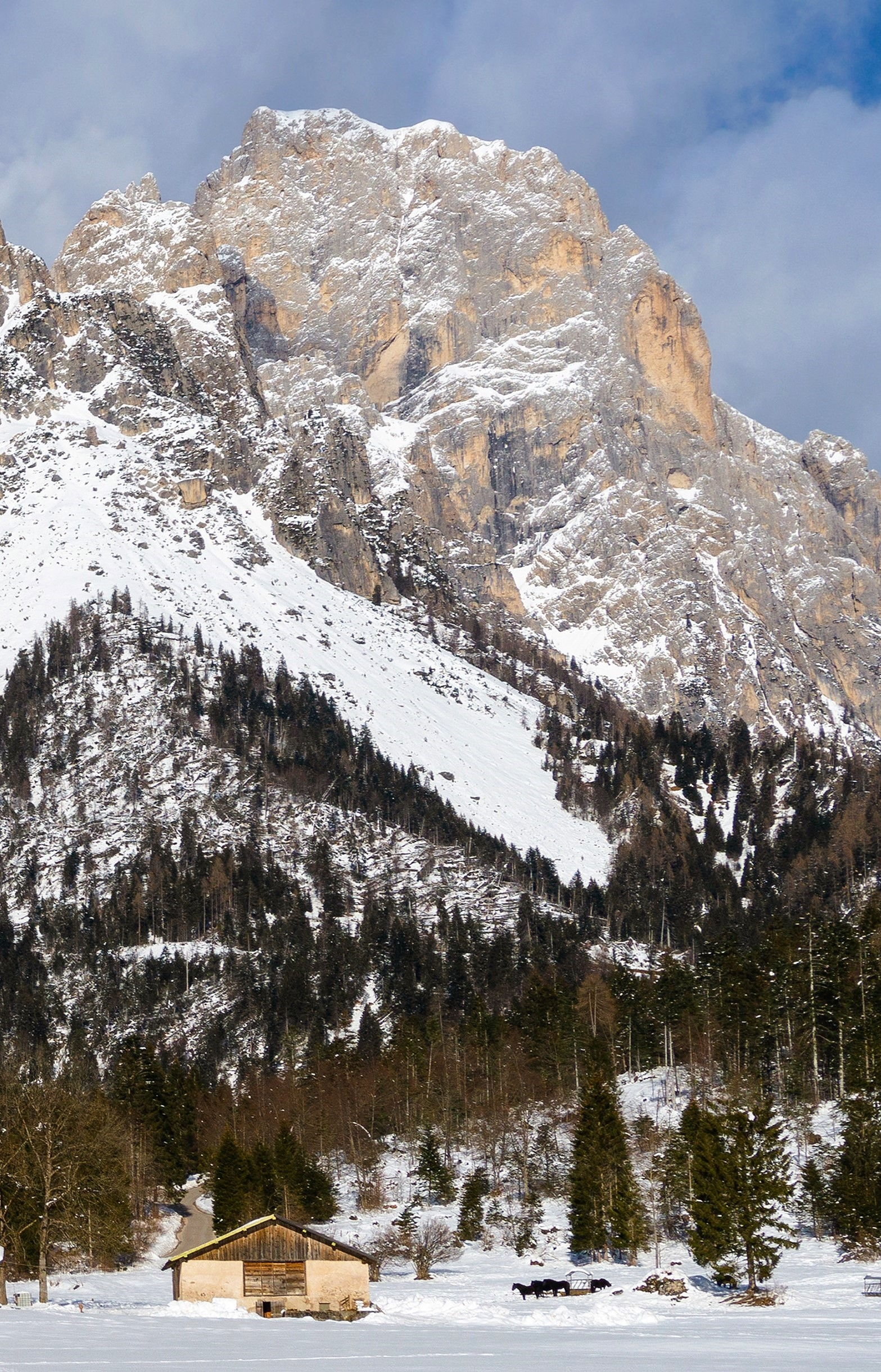
- South aspect in winter

Highest point
- Elevation: 2,846 m (9,337 ft)
- Prominence: 202 m (663 ft)
- Parent peak: Pala di San Martino
- Isolation: 1.44 km (0.89 mi)
- Coordinates: 46°14′52″N 11°53′30″E

Geography
- Location within Italy Location within Alps
- Interactive map of Cima di Lastei
- Country: Italy
- Region: Trentino-Alto Adige/Südtirol
- Protected area: Paneveggio-Pale di San Martino Natural Park
- Parent range: Dolomites; Pale di San Martino
- Topo map: Tabacco 22 Pale di San Martino

Geology
- Rock age: Triassic
- Rock type: Dolomite

Cima di Lastei is a mountain in the Trentino-Alto Adige/Südtirol region of northern Italy.

== Description ==
Cima di Lastei is a 2,846-meter-elevation (9,337-foot) summit in the Pale di San Martino group of the Dolomites. Set in the province of Trentino, the peak is located eight kilometers (5 miles) northeast of the municipality of Primiero San Martino di Castrozza and within Paneveggio-Pale di San Martino Natural Park, a UNESCO World Heritage Site. Precipitation runoff from the mountain's slopes drains into Torrente Canali which is a tributary of the Cismon. Topographic relief is significant as the summit rises 1,250 meters (4,101 feet) above the Canali Valley in one kilometer (0.6 mile). The nearest higher neighbor is Cima di Fradusta, 1.44 kilometers (0.9 miles) to the west. The Cima di Lastei toponym translates as "Summit of the Slabs".

== Climate ==
Based on the Köppen climate classification, Cima di Lastei is located in an alpine climate zone with long, cold winters, and short, mild summers. Weather systems are forced upward by the mountains (orographic lift), causing moisture to drop in the form of rain and snow. The months of June through September offer the most favorable weather for climbing or visiting this area.

== Gallery ==
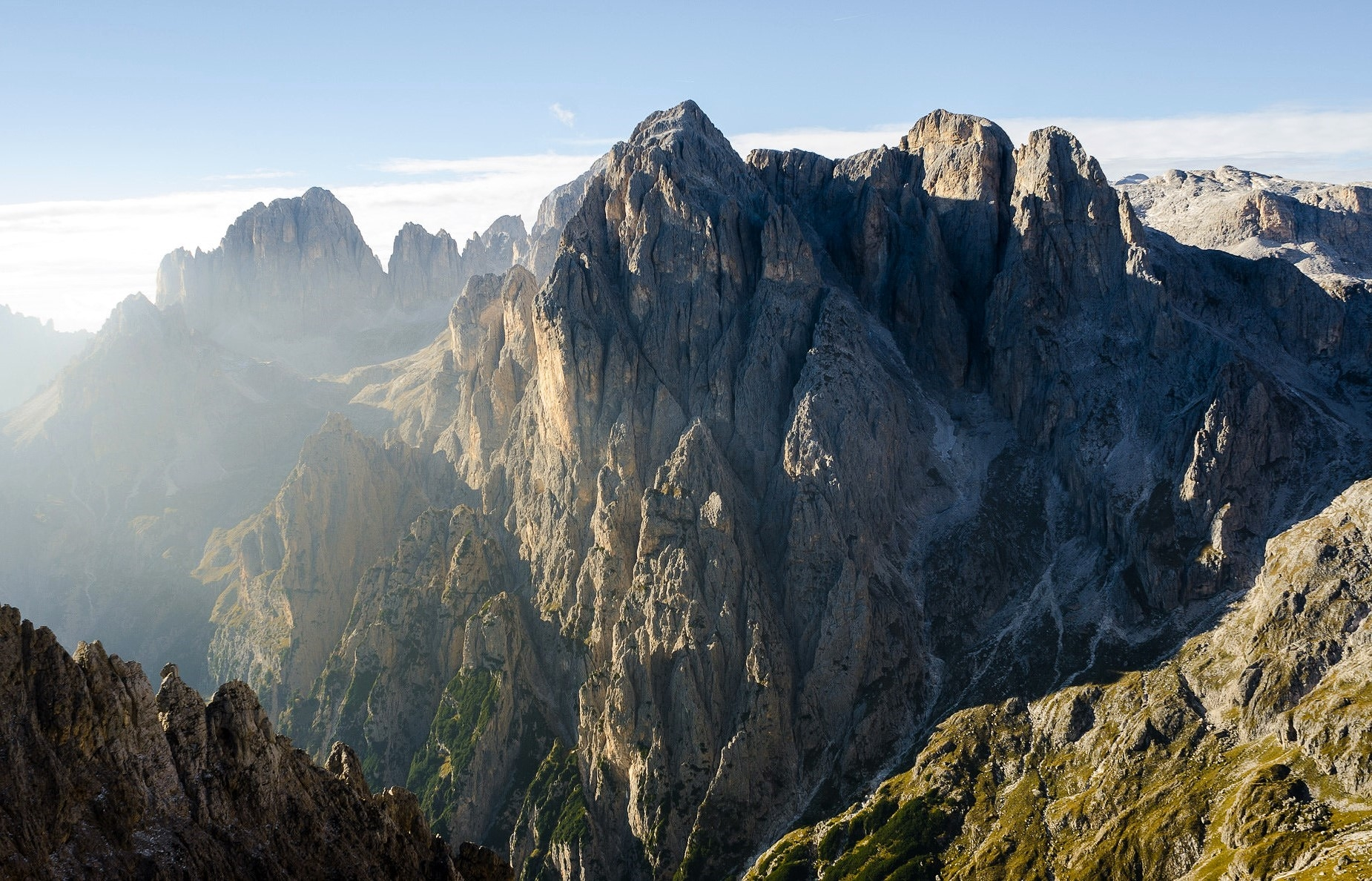
East aspect, centered

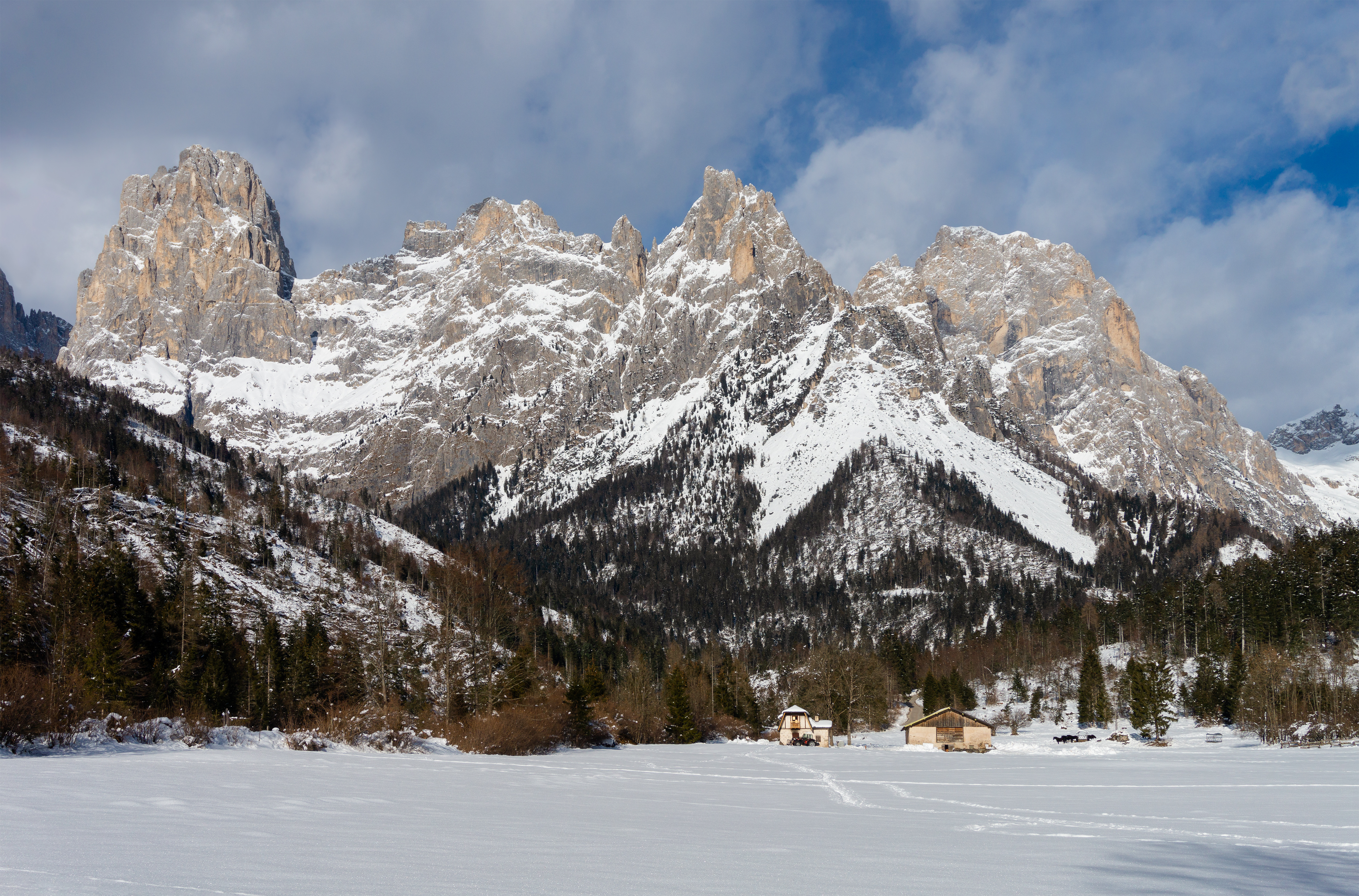
L→R Cima Canali, Sasso delle Lede, Cima d'Ostio, Cima di Lastei

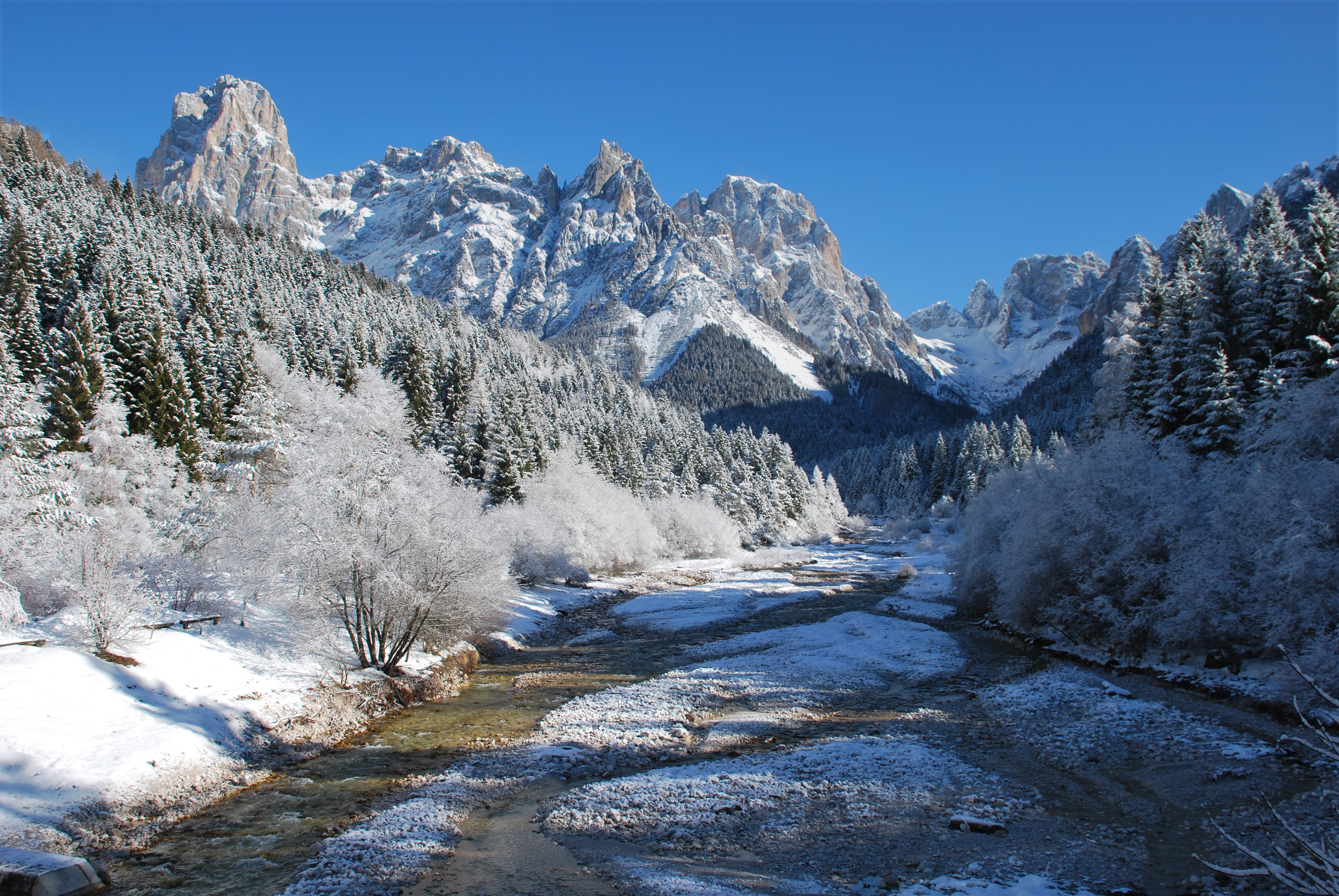
Torrente Canali in Canali Valley.
Cima di Lastei right of center.

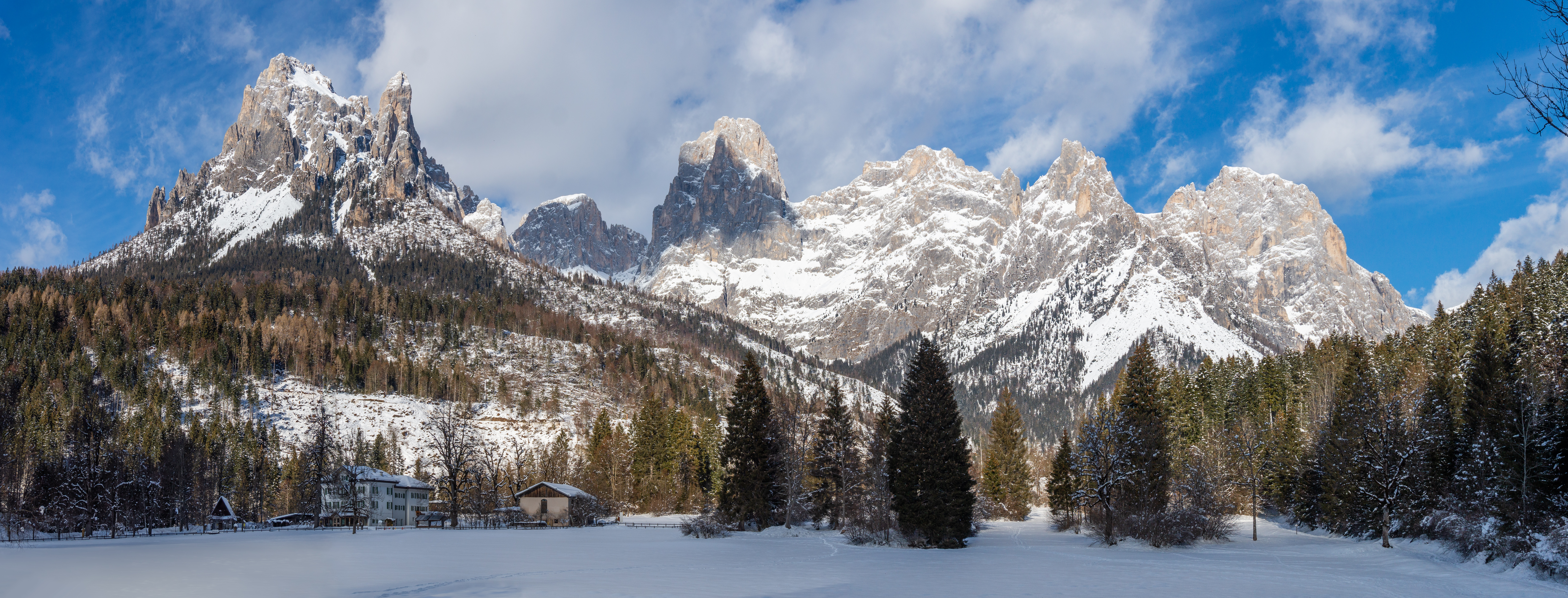
Cima di Lastei furthest to right

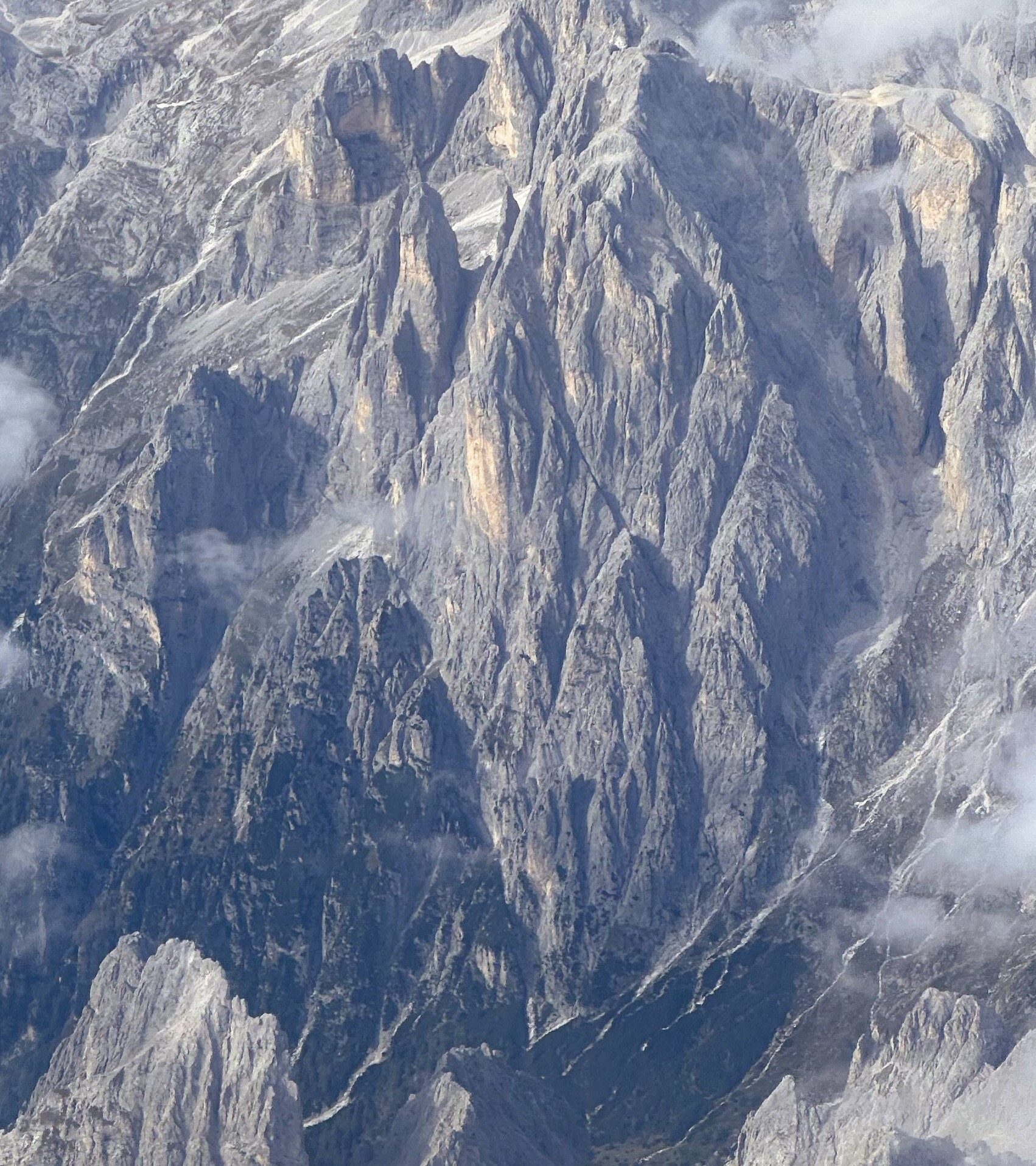
East aspect of Cima di Lastei viewed from airliner

== See also ==
- Southern Limestone Alps
