= Paneveggio-Pale di San Martino Natural Park =

Nature reserve in Trentino-Alto Adige, Italy

- Parco naturale Paneveggio-Pale di San Martino
- IUCN category IV (habitat/species management area)
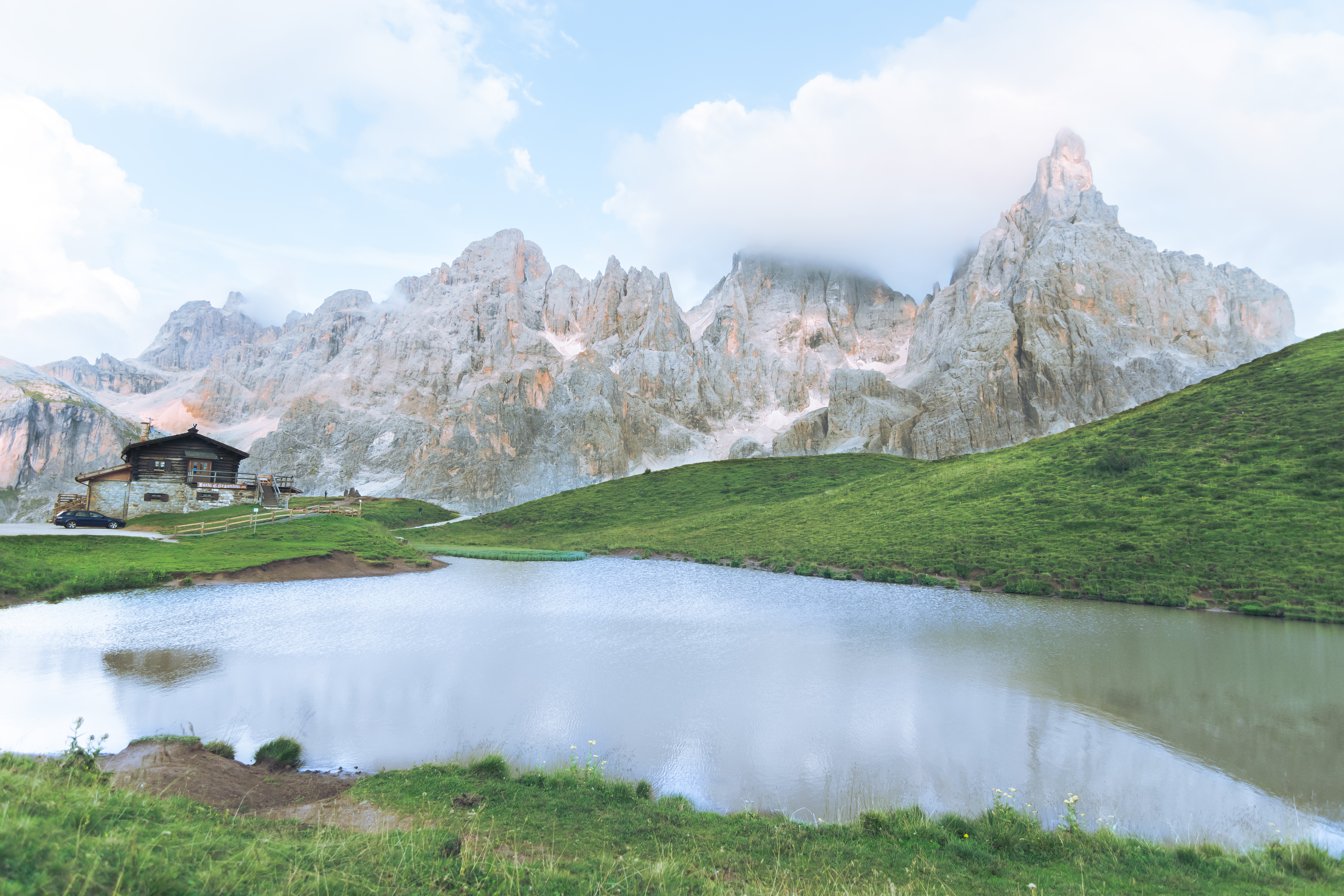

- Location within Italy
- Location: Trentino-Alto Adige, Italy
- Coordinates: 46°18′32″N 11°44′47″E
- Area: 19,726 ha (48,740 acres)
- Elevation: 3,192 m (10,472 ft)
- Established: 1967
- Website: www.parcopan.org

The Paneveggio-Pale di San Martino Natural Park (Italian: Parco naturale Paneveggio-Pale di San Martino) is a nature reserve in Trentino, Italy. Established in 1967, it stretches over nearly 20,000 ha (49,000 acres) in the Dolomites (in the territory of seven municipalities, all in the Province of Trento), encompassing the Pale di San Martino massif, the Paneveggio forest, and the easternmost part of the Lagorai range, between the valleys of Fiemme, Fassa, Primiero, and Vanoi.

When originally established, the park had an area of 15,700 ha (39,000 acres), which was increased by another 4,000 ha (9,900 acres) in 1987. The lowest point is about 1,100 m (3,600 ft) above sea level, whereas the highest point is the Vezzana, the highest peak of the Pala group, 3,192 m (10,472 ft) above sea level. Its territory is divided into three categories with different levels of protection: "integral reserve" (39.82 % of the park's territory), where no human activity outside of research and hiking is allowed; "guided reserve" (49.75 %), where agricultural activity is allowed; "controlled reserve" (10.43 %), where more protection is lower and human activity is subjected to fewer restrictions. Five special reserves have been established inside the park (Valbona, Val dei Buoi, Valsorda, Val Canali, Val Ceremana), which also includes four areas of special protection which are part of the Natura 2000 network (Lagorai orientale-Cima Bocche, Pale di San Martino, Palù dei Mugheri, and Lagorai). The Pala group is also a UNESCO World Heritage Site since 2009.

At lower elevations, the flora includes manna ashes, sessile oaks, Italian oaks, and chestnuts, whereas between 1,500–19,000 m (4,900–62,300 ft) above sea level the most widespread tree (85 %) is the Norway spruce, which forms the Paneveggio forest (over 2,700 ha (6,700 acres)), famous for the use of its wood in the production of violins. At higher elevations, between 1,900–2,200 m (6,200–7,200 ft), larches and Swiss pines are more prevalent, while silver firs are more widespread near the Val di Fiemme. Shrubs are prevalent between 2,200–2,400 m (7,200–7,900 ft), and are replaced by grasslands and lichens at higher elevations. There are 650 known species of lichens in the park, including 59 rare species, but some estimates put the total number at one thousand.

The fauna is varied. Large mammals include the red deer (which had previously gone extinct in the region but started to return in the 1960s and has become the symbol of the park, with about 2,000 specimens), the roe deer, and the chamois. Starting from 2000 the Alpine ibex, previously extinct, has been reintroduced in the Pala group. Smaller mammals include foxes, marmots, squirrels, European hares, mountain hares, European badgers, dormouses, beech martens, European pine martens, European moles, Alpine shrews, and Iberian water shrews.

Over 80 species of birds live in the park, including Western capercaillie, black grouse, rock ptarmigan, hazel grouse, Eurasian eagle-owls, golden eagles, common buzzards, European honey buzzards, Tawny owls, long-eared owls, Tengmalm's owls, Eurasian pygmy owls, Eurasian goshawks, Eurasian sparrowhawks, common kestrels, black woodpeckers, goldcrests, Eurasian blackcaps, fieldfares, mistle thrushes, white-throated dippers, Eurasian treecreepers, corn crakes, and the rare Eurasian three-toed woodpecker. Amphibians include the alpine salamander and the alpine newt, whereas snakes include the smooth snake, the grass snake, the European asp and the adder. Invertebrate species include the white-clawed crayfish and a hundred species of butterflies. River trouts and Arctic chars inhabit the streams and lakes. The park has three visitor centres, in Paneveggio, San Martino di Castrozza and Val Canali (Villa Welsperg), and over twenty mountain huts and mountain shelters, linked by a network of hiking paths.
