= Noana Valley =

Valley in Trentino, Italy

Coordinates: 46°08′06″N 11°51′08″E

Noana
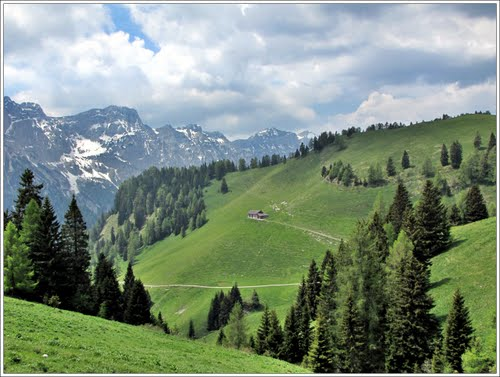
- The alpine hut Nèva, in the higher part of the valley
- Long-axis direction: north east - south west
- Interactive map of Noana

Noana valley (dialect of Primiero and Italian language: val Noàna) is located in the eastern Alps. It is an uninhabited valley (because in the winters is very cold) in eastern Trentino, Italy. It ends in Primiero valley.

It is divided in three comunes: Imèr, Mezzano and Transacqua.
