= Primiero =

Valley in Trentino, Italy

Coordinates: 46°11′N 11°50′E

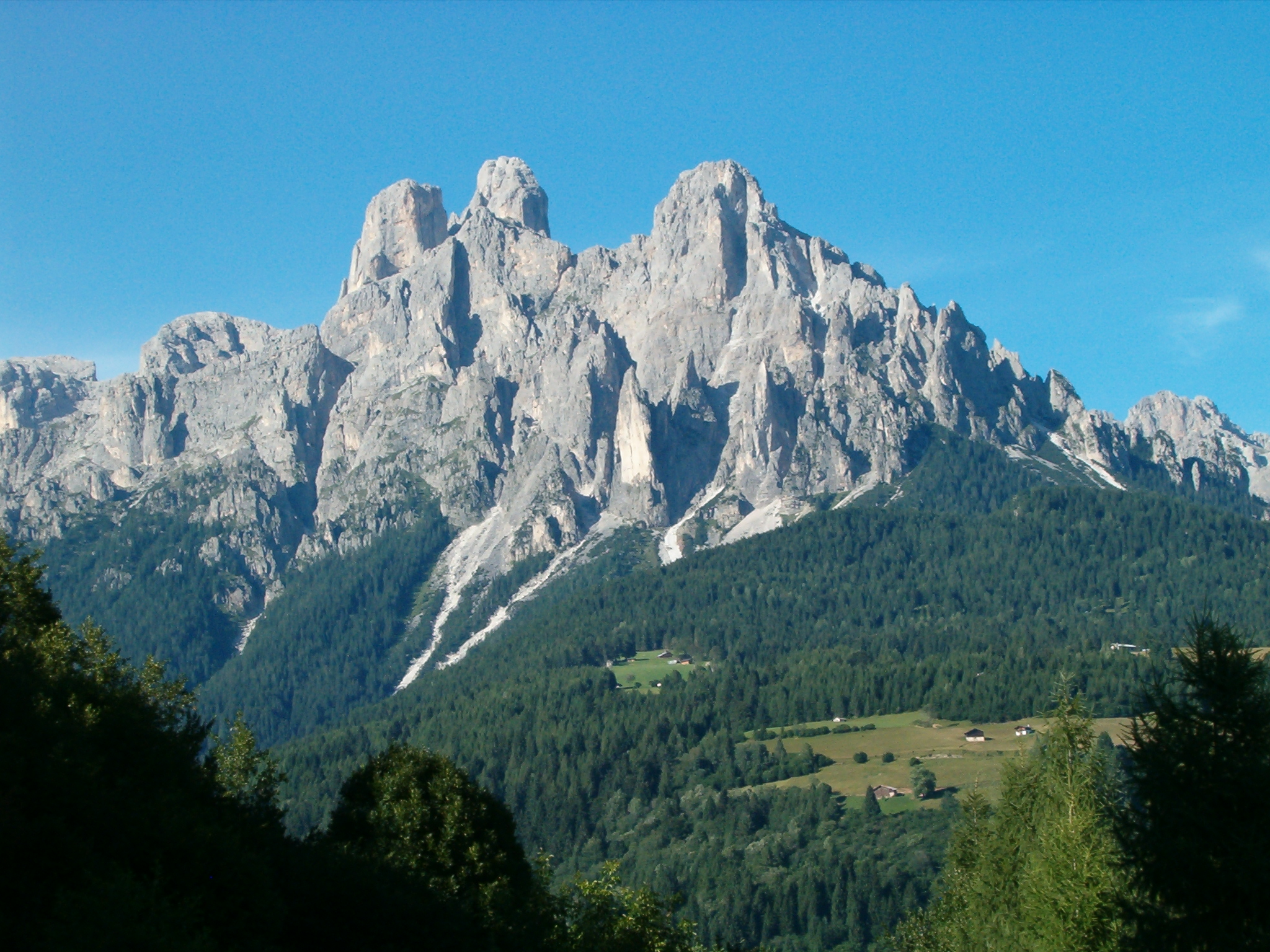
Pale di San Martino (Cima Madonna, Sass Maor, Cima Cimerlo) viewed from the Primiero valley

The Primiero (Primier in local dialect) is a valley located in the eastern part of Trentino, Italy. It consists of eight municipalities (comuni): Canal San Bovo, Fiera di Primiero, Imèr, Mezzano, Sagron Mis, Siròr, Tonadico and Transacqua.

In Primiero a particular Venetian dialect is spoken.

== History ==
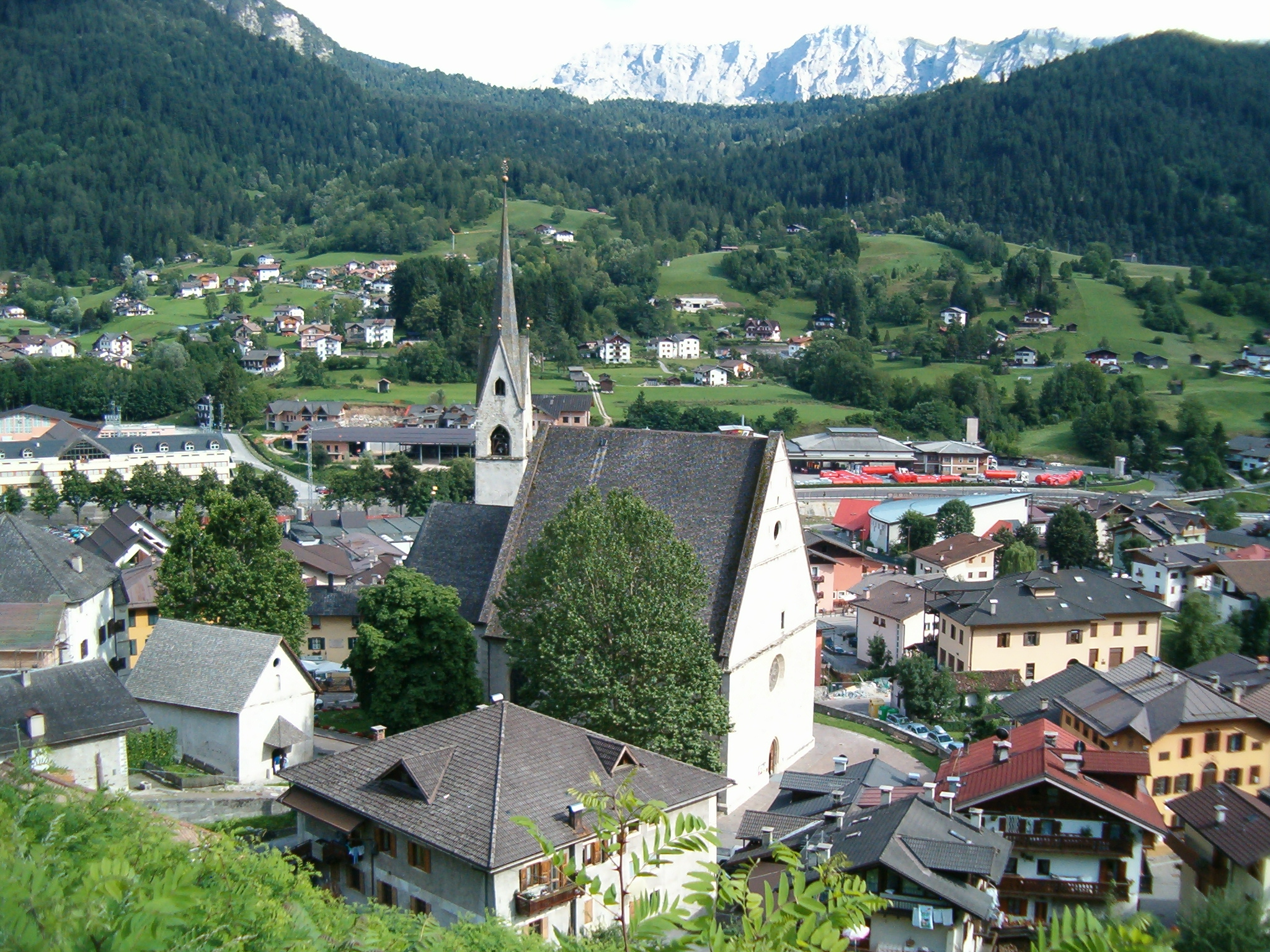
The Pieve of Santa Maria Assunta in Fiera

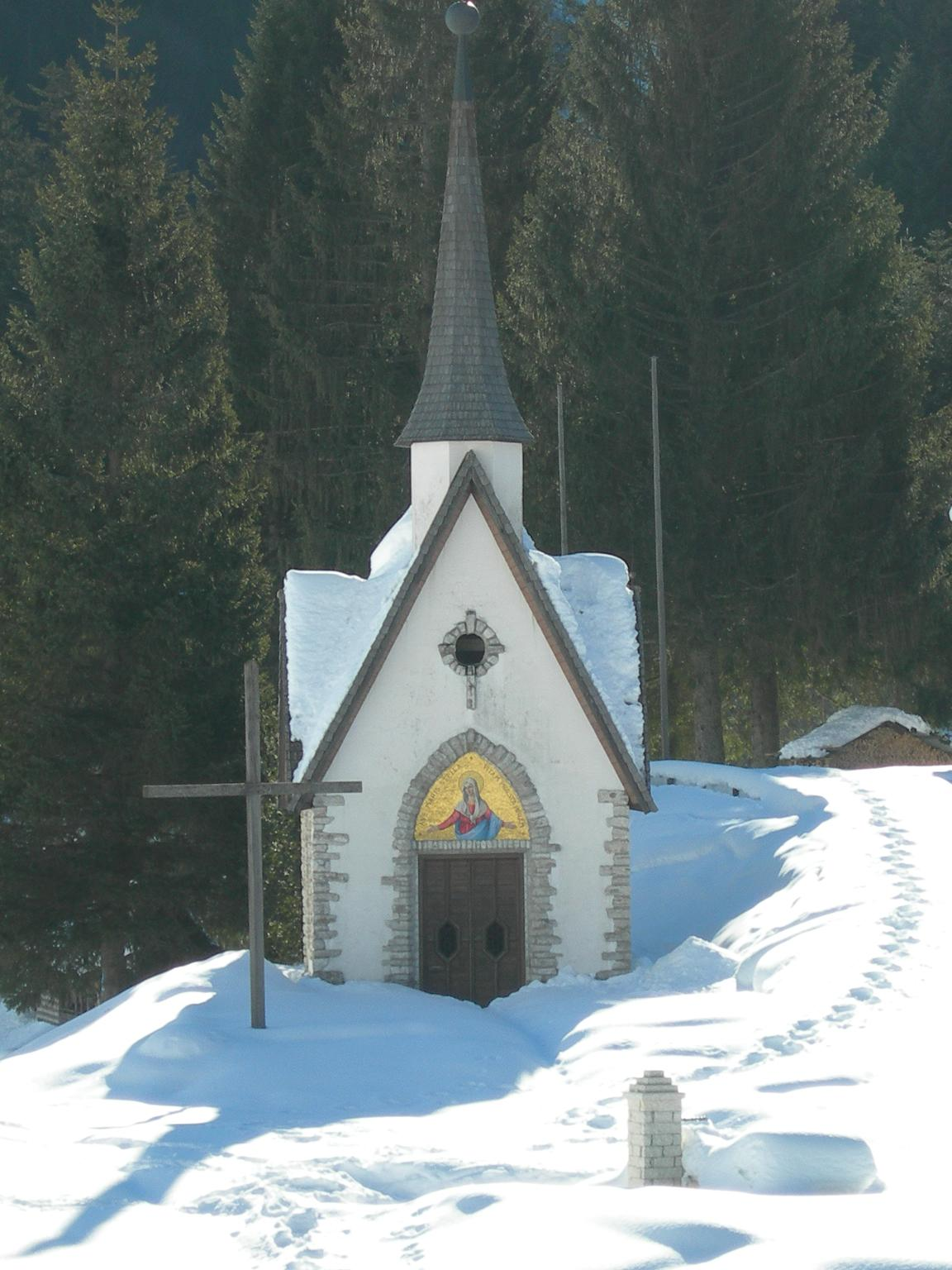
The little church of Vederna mountain

During the Roman period the Primiero was part of Italy, belonging to the region Venetia et Histria. It was subsequently incorporated into the Italian kingdoms established by Odoacer and the Ostrogoths, before being reconquered by Emperor Justinian and passing to the East Roman Praetorian prefecture of Italy. From 569 to 774 it formed part of the Kingdom of Italy under the Longobards. In 774 the Kingdom of Italy was conquered by the Franks. The Primiero then became part of the territories ruled by the Carolingian Kings of Italy, followed by a series of independent and contesting Italic kings.

From 961 the Kingdom of Italy was incorporated into the Holy Roman Empire. For a long time the history of Primiero was united with that of Feltre, as the valley was a fief or feudal dependency of the bishop of that Venetian city.

From 1379 until 1918, the Primiero was part of the County of Tyrol which, other than a brief period when it was ceded to the Kingdom of Bavaria (1807–1809) and Kingdom of Italy (1809-1814) during the Napoleonic wars, was ruled by the Austrian Habsburgs (and later their successors the Habsburg-Lorraines). As such it successively formed part of the Habsburg monarchy, the Austrian Empire (from 1804) and, following the compromise of 1867, part of the Cisleithanian (Austrian-ruled) territories of Austria-Hungary. It was the capital of the district of the same name, one of the 21 Bezirkshauptmannschaften in Tyrol.

It was ceded to Italy along with the rest of Trentino-Alto Adige/Südtirol in the Treaty of Saint-Germain-en-Laye (1919) following Austria-Hungary's defeat in World War I.

== See also ==
- Lagorai
- Pale di San Martino
