= 2009 Giro d'Italia, Stage 1 to Stage 11 =

Stage 1 to Stage 11 of the 2009 Giro d'Italia

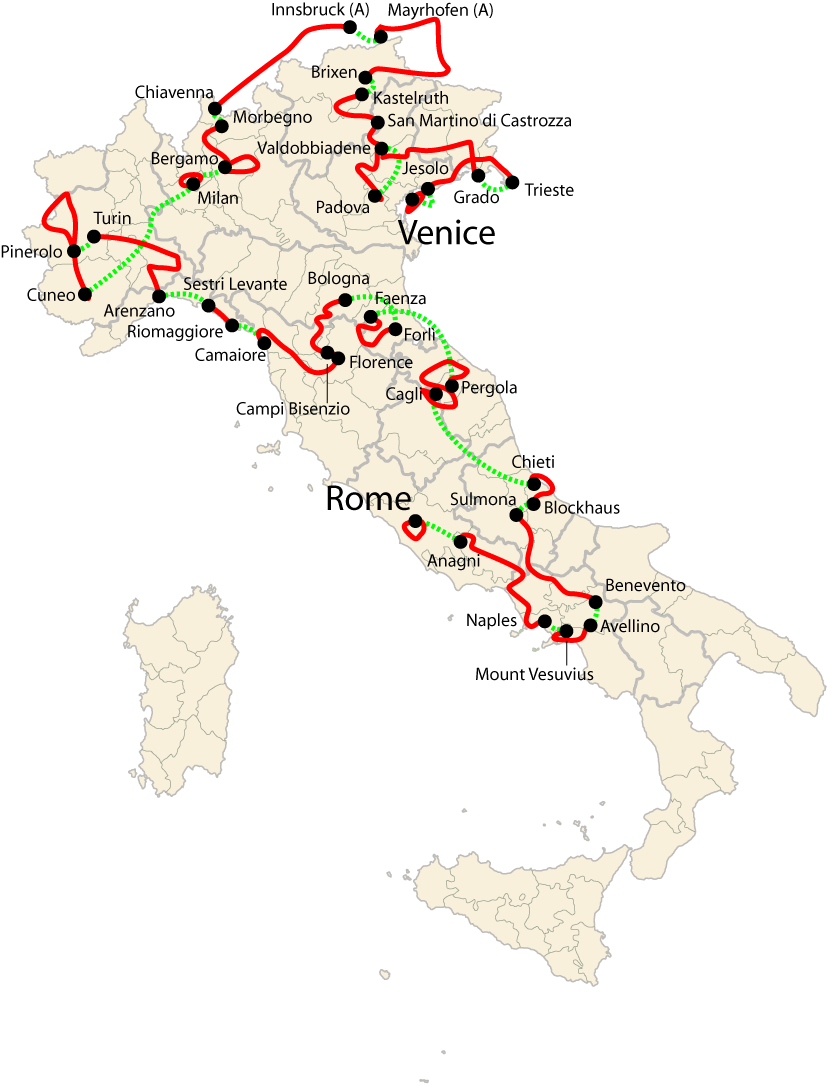
Overview of the stages; red lines represent distances covered in the individual stages, while green lines are the distances between the stages

The 2009 Giro d'Italia began on 9 May, with Stage 11 occurring on 20 May. The first stage, like it had been since 2007, was a team time trial, a stage where each member of the team raced together against the clock. Like most cycling Grand Tours do, the beginning of the 2009 Giro included a string of flat stages that were contested by sprinters. These stages were contested by Alessandro Petacchi and Mark Cavendish, among others, with Petacchi in victory becoming one of the only riders to defeat Cavendish in a sprint in the 2009 season.

At the end of the race's first week and beginning of its second were three hilly medium-mountain stages. These stages took the Giro through Austria and Switzerland before returning to Italy. Each of these stages took more than five hours to complete, and the rain that fell each day combined with the difficulties presented by the numerous ascents and descents made the courses potentially unsafe in the riders' opinion. This opinion was perhaps validated by the life-threatening injuries sustained by Pedro Horrillo in the eighth stage after he crashed while descending a mountain. While the ninth stage was meant to be a showy criterium in celebration of this being the 100th anniversary of the Giro d'Italia, the riders collectively protested the safety conditions of that stage and the ones before it. This meant it would be neutralized, with every rider receiving the same finishing time as the stage winner regardless of when they finished.

The tenth stage was the longest of this year's Giro, and one of its most mountainous. It, along with a stage later in the race, were both called the race's queen stage, its most difficult stage. Danilo Di Luca won this stage to pad his overall lead going into the second half of the Giro.

Legend
A pink jersey	Denotes the leader of the General classification	A green jersey	Denotes the leader of the Mountains classification
A violet jersey	Denotes the leader of the Points classification	A white jersey	Denotes the leader of the Young rider classification
	s.t. indicates that the rider crossed the finish line in the same group as the one receiving the time above him, and was therefore credited with the same finishing time.		

== Stage 1 ==
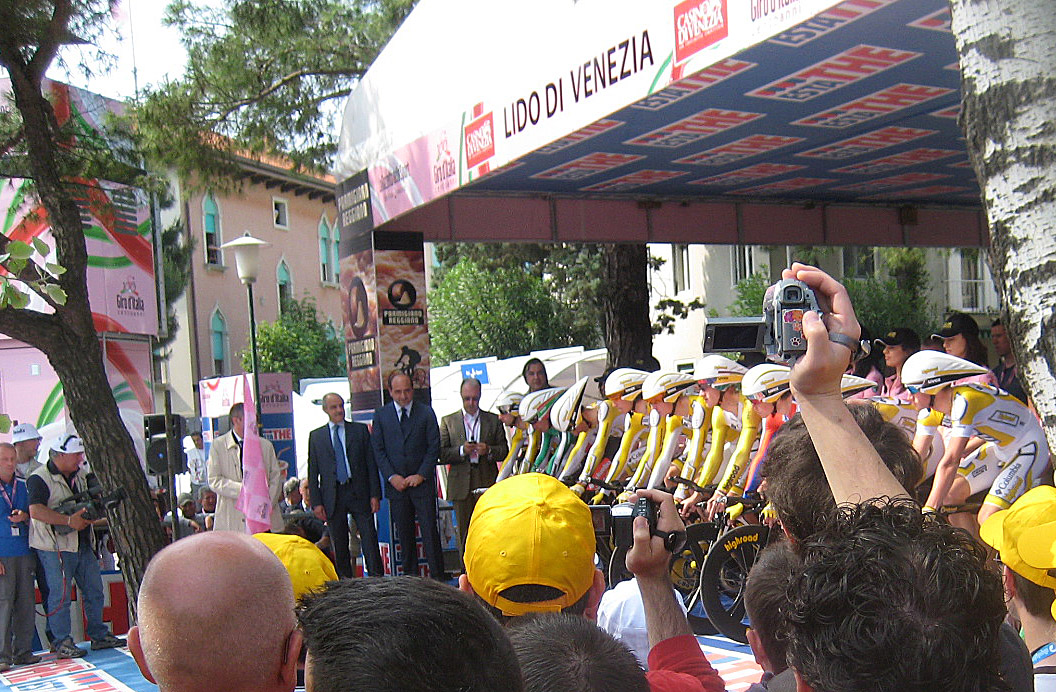
Team Columbia–High Road in the starthouse in Lido

9 May 2009 — Lido (Venice), 20.5 km (12.7 mi) (team time trial)

The 2009 Giro began, as it had since 2007, with a team time trial (TTT). The 20.5 km (12.7 mi) ride over a perfectly flat course in Venice decided who would wear the first pink jersey.

Team Columbia–High Road was the first team to ride the course, and wound up being the stage winners. They all finished together, which is relatively uncommon (especially for a winning team: only Caisse d'Epargne, which took the course nearly a minute slower, managed to also have all nine riders cross the finish line together). Garmin–Slipstream, who had said previously it was their goal to replicate their TTT victory from the 2008 Giro d'Italia, finished officially 6 seconds back of Team Columbia–High Road, but they had only the minimum of 5 riders finishing together (the team's time is taken for the fifth rider to cross the line). As the first Team Columbia–High Road rider to cross the line, Mark Cavendish was awarded the first pink jersey as general classification (GC) leader; he was also awarded the white jersey as youth classification leader.

Stage 1 result

	Team	Time
1	Team Columbia–High Road	21' 50"
2	Garmin–Slipstream	+ 6"
3	Astana	+ 13"
4	LPR Brakes–Farnese Vini	+ 22"
5	ISD	+ 27"
6	Team Katusha	+ 35"
7	Rabobank	+ 38"
8	Liquigas	+ 40"
9	Lampre–NGC	+ 42"
10	Team Milram	+ 49"

General classification after stage 1

	Rider	Team	Time
1	Mark Cavendish (GBR)	Team Columbia–High Road	21' 50"
2	Marco Pinotti (ITA)	Team Columbia–High Road	+ 0"
3	Edvald Boasson Hagen (NOR)	Team Columbia–High Road	+ 0"
4	Michael Rogers (AUS)	Team Columbia–High Road	+ 0"
5	Thomas Lövkvist (SWE)	Team Columbia–High Road	+ 0"
6	Mark Renshaw (AUS)	Team Columbia–High Road	+ 0"
7	Kanstantsin Sivtsov (BLR)	Team Columbia–High Road	+ 0"
8	Morris Possoni (ITA)	Team Columbia–High Road	+ 0"
9	Michael Barry (CAN)	Team Columbia–High Road	+ 0"
10	David Zabriskie (USA)	Garmin–Slipstream	+ 6"

== Stage 2 ==
10 May 2009 — Jesolo to Trieste, 156 km (97 mi)

This stage was very flat. It had only one categorized climb, at low elevation, near the end. This climb award the first points in the mountains classification and thus, the first green jersey awarded to its leader. The riders took three laps of an 11 km (6.8 mi) finishing circuit in Trieste, with the points for the climb taken on their second time over the hill at Montebello.

Leonardo Scarselli was free of the main field for most of the stage after escaping early in the morning. The bunch caught him with 31 km (19 mi) to race, though. David García won the climb in Trieste to become the first wearer of the green jersey, and Alessandro Petacchi won the group sprint to the line, narrowly edging out race leader Mark Cavendish.

A crash on the third pass over the Montebello hill meant the field was broken, with only 51 riders together for the sprint finish. The rest of the peloton finished 13 seconds back, and since this crash occurred outside 3 km (1.9 mi) from the finish line, all time lost stood as lost. Notables among those who lost 13 seconds were Levi Leipheimer and Ivan Basso.

Stage 2 result

	Rider	Team	Time
1	Alessandro Petacchi (ITA)	LPR Brakes–Farnese Vini	3h 43' 07"
2	Mark Cavendish (GBR)	Team Columbia–High Road	s.t.
3	Ben Swift (GBR)	Team Katusha	s.t.
4	Allan Davis (AUS)	Quick-Step	s.t.
5	Tyler Farrar (USA)	Garmin–Slipstream	s.t.
6	Oscar Gatto (ITA)	ISD	s.t.
7	Francesco Gavazzi (ITA)	Lampre–NGC	s.t.
8	Davide Viganò (ITA)	Fuji–Servetto	s.t.
9	Manuele Mori (ITA)	Lampre–NGC	s.t.
10	Dries Devenyns (BEL)	Quick-Step	s.t.

General classification after stage 2

	Rider	Team	Time
1	Mark Cavendish (GBR)	Team Columbia–High Road	4h 04' 43"
2	Mark Renshaw (AUS)	Team Columbia–High Road	+ 14"
3	Michael Rogers (AUS)	Team Columbia–High Road	+ 14"
4	Thomas Lövkvist (SWE)	Team Columbia–High Road	+ 14"
5	Edvald Boasson Hagen (NOR)	Team Columbia–High Road	+ 14"
6	Tyler Farrar (USA)	Garmin–Slipstream	+ 16"
7	Alessandro Petacchi (ITA)	LPR Brakes–Farnese Vini	+ 16"
8	Christian Vande Velde (USA)	Garmin–Slipstream	+ 20"
9	Bradley Wiggins (GBR)	Garmin–Slipstream	+ 20"
10	Lance Armstrong (USA)	Astana	+ 27"

== Stage 3 ==
11 May 2009 — Grado to Valdobbiadene, 198 km (123 mi)

This stage was also flat, and ended in a mass sprint.

A five rider breakaway, which had a maximum advantage of seven minutes, took the points at the one intermediate sprint and the one categorised climb of the day, but were caught with some 38 km (24 mi) remaining. A number of crashes occurred starting at the 50 km (31 mi) remaining mark, and a series of attempted breaks meant that the peloton was fragmented, and Alessandro Petacchi took a second successive stage from a depleted group sprint.

The biggest victim of the repeated crashes was Garmin–Slipstream leader Christian Vande Velde, who had to retire from the Giro with a broken rib and a hairline fracture of his pelvis. The crashes also made it so Mark Cavendish was not with the main peloton as it approached the finish line; he came to within 15 seconds of the group before abandoning the attempt to reach them, and essentially conceding the pink jersey. Petacchi's second straight stage win gave him the race leadership.

Stage 3 result

	Rider	Team	Time
1	Alessandro Petacchi (ITA)	LPR Brakes–Farnese Vini	4h 45' 27"
2	Tyler Farrar (USA)	Garmin–Slipstream	s.t.
3	Francesco Gavazzi (ITA)	Lampre–NGC	s.t.
4	Dario Cataldo (ITA)	Quick-Step	s.t.
5	Damiano Cunego (ITA)	Lampre–NGC	s.t.
6	Philippe Gilbert (BEL)	Silence–Lotto	s.t.
7	Oscar Gatto (ITA)	ISD	s.t.
8	Michael Rogers (AUS)	Team Columbia–High Road	s.t.
9	Anders Lund (DEN)	Team Saxo Bank	s.t.
10	Stefano Garzelli (ITA)	Acqua & Sapone–Caffè Mokambo	s.t.

General classification after stage 3

	Rider	Team	Time
1	Alessandro Petacchi (ITA)	LPR Brakes–Farnese Vini	8h 50' 06"
2	Tyler Farrar (USA)	Garmin–Slipstream	+ 8"
3	Michael Rogers (AUS)	Team Columbia–High Road	+ 18"
4	Thomas Lövkvist (SWE)	Team Columbia–High Road	+ 18"
5	Lance Armstrong (USA)	Astana	+ 31"
DSQ	~~Danilo Di Luca (ITA)~~	~~LPR Brakes–Farnese Vini~~	+ 40"
7	Yaroslav Popovych (UKR)	Astana	+ 44"
8	Levi Leipheimer (USA)	Astana	+ 44"
9	Andriy Hryvko (UKR)	ISD	+ 45"
10	Francesco Gavazzi (ITA)	Lampre–NGC	+ 52"

== Stage 4 ==
12 May 2009 — Padova to San Martino di Castrozza, 162 km (101 mi)

This was the first mountain stage of the Giro, with a high climb coming at 123 km (76 mi) and a mountain finish at San Martino di Castrozza.

A group of 6 riders escaped after just 5 km (3.1 mi). This group comprised Serafín Martínez, Francesco Bellotti, Davide Viganò, Ian Stannard, Francesco De Bonis, and Jens Voigt. They attained a maximum advantage of six and a half minutes, and with a healthy pace of 45 km/h (28 mph) through the stage's first three hours, it appeared possible that one of them would be the stage winner. The pace caught up with the group as they reached the foot of the day's final climb, and only Voigt and Bellotti remained together as the climb began. Two kilometers into the climb, Voigt attacked again and tried to solo to victory over the last 8 km (5.0 mi).

The top GC men in the peloton and the specialist climbers formed a chase group that overhauled Voigt in the final 3 km (1.9 mi). The attacks of Colombian climber Mauricio Soler had been responsible for driving this group to catch the remnants of the breakaway, and he attacked again in the final 2 km (1.2 mi), quickly getting a gap over the competition and appearing poised for the stage win. As Soler had been the one who caused the crash that kept Mark Cavendish from potentially defending the pink jersey the day before, his combativeness on this stage was described as his "redemption". 2007 Giro d'Italia winner Danilo Di Luca timed his sprint to the line just right and overtook Soler for the victory. Sixteen riders finished with the same time as Di Luca, ten more were six seconds back, and a further 26 were inside a minute of his winning time. Thomas Lövkvist, who finished in the same group as Di Luca, took a narrow lead in the overall classification after the stage. However, Di Luca later tested positive for EPO and was stripped of his victory. The stage win was subsequently awarded to Stefano Garzelli, the runner-up.

Stage 4 result

	Rider	Team	Time
DSQ	~~Danilo Di Luca (ITA)~~	~~LPR Brakes–Farnese Vini~~	
1	Stefano Garzelli (ITA)	Acqua & Sapone–Caffè Mokambo	4h 15' 04"
DSQ	~~Franco Pellizotti (ITA)~~	~~Liquigas~~	s.t.
4	Mauricio Soler (COL)	Barloworld	s.t.
5	Gilberto Simoni (ITA)	Diquigiovanni–Androni	s.t.
6	Levi Leipheimer (USA)	Astana	s.t.
7	Thomas Lövkvist (SWE)	Team Columbia–High Road	s.t.
8	Ivan Basso (ITA)	Liquigas	s.t.
9	Denis Menchov (RUS)	Rabobank	s.t.
10	David Arroyo (ESP)	Caisse d'Epargne	s.t.

General classification after stage 4

	Rider	Team	Time
1	Thomas Lövkvist (SWE)	Team Columbia–High Road	13h 05' 28"
DSQ	~~Danilo Di Luca (ITA)~~	~~LPR Brakes–Farnese Vini~~	+ 2"
3	Michael Rogers (AUS)	Team Columbia–High Road	+ 6"
4	Yaroslav Popovych (UKR)	Astana	+ 26"
5	Levi Leipheimer (USA)	Astana	+ 26"
6	Lance Armstrong (USA)	Astana	+ 28"
DSQ	~~Franco Pellizotti (ITA)~~	~~Liquigas~~	+ 32"
8	Damiano Cunego (ITA)	Lampre–NGC	+ 42"
9	Marzio Bruseghin (ITA)	Lampre–NGC	+ 42"
10	Carlos Sastre (ESP)	Cervélo TestTeam	+ 49"

== Stage 5 ==
13 May 2009 — San Martino di Castrozza to Alpe di Siusi, 125 km (78 mi)

This was one of the shortest road race stages in the 2009 Giro, but its profile was quite unusual. It saw the riders start where they ended the previous day, on the mountaintop at San Martino di Castrozza, climb some 400 m (1,300 ft) for a categorized climb at Passo Rolle, and then descend over 1,700 m (5,600 ft) before climbing most of that distance right back for another mountaintop finish at Alpe di Siusi.

A seven-man breakaway was clear over the Passo Rolle climb and took a maximum lead of four and a half minutes in the valley between peaks. Giovanni Visconti was briefly race leader on the road, as he began the stage just under three minutes behind pink jersey wearer Thomas Lövkvist in the General Classification. The peloton, paced by Liquigas, caught them without about 15 km (9.3 mi) left to race, leading the way for Sylwester Szmyd and then Ivan Basso to try to fracture the field before the finish. Six riders were able to keep his pace to the finish, with Denis Menchov the first to Alpe di Suisi for the stage win. The other six in the leading group kept close to the stage winner, with only Carlos Sastre losing more than ten seconds. Danilo Di Luca became the new race leader after his second place on the stage.

Damiano Cunego, Lance Armstrong and Stefano Garzelli, all of whom had been considered as possible favorites for overall victory in the Giro, all lost more than two minutes on this stage, being unable to take Liquigas' pace on the way up to Alpe di Suisi. As they, along with Michael Rogers, had shown weakness on the climb, one report named as the only remaining possibilities for Giro champion Menchov, Di Luca, Lövkvist, Basso, Levi Leipheimer, and Sastre. The victory gave Menchov stage wins in all three Grand Tours for his career, and his team Rabobank its first ever Giro d'Italia stage win.

Stage 5 result

	Rider	Team	Time
1	Denis Menchov (RUS)	Rabobank	3h 15' 24"
DSQ	~~Danilo Di Luca (ITA)~~	~~LPR Brakes–Farnese Vini~~	+ 2"
3	Thomas Lövkvist (SWE)	Team Columbia–High Road	+ 5"
4	Ivan Basso (ITA)	Liquigas	s.t.
5	Levi Leipheimer (USA)	Astana	+ 9"
6	Chris Horner (USA)	Astana	s.t.
7	Carlos Sastre (ESP)	Cervélo TestTeam	+ 19"
8	David Arroyo (ESP)	Caisse d'Epargne	+ 22"
9	Michael Rogers (AUS)	Team Columbia–High Road	s.t.
10	Fredrik Kessiakoff (SWE)	Fuji–Servetto	s.t.

General classification after stage 5

	Rider	Team	Time
DSQ	~~Danilo Di Luca (ITA)~~	~~LPR Brakes–Farnese Vini~~	16h 20' 44"
2	Thomas Lövkvist (SWE)	Team Columbia–High Road	+ 5"
3	Michael Rogers (AUS)	Team Columbia–High Road	+ 36"
4	Levi Leipheimer (USA)	Astana	+ 43"
5	Denis Menchov (RUS)	Rabobank	+ 50"
6	Ivan Basso (ITA)	Liquigas	+ 1' 06"
7	Carlos Sastre (ESP)	Cervélo TestTeam	+ 1' 16"
8	Chris Horner (USA)	Astana	+ 1' 17"
DSQ	~~Franco Pellizotti (ITA)~~	~~Liquigas~~	+ 1' 27"
10	David Arroyo (ESP)	Caisse d'Epargne	+ 1' 41"

== Stage 6 ==
14 May 2009 — Brixen to Mayrhofen (Austria), 248 km (154 mi)

This stage was one of the longest in the 2009 Giro. The first half of the stage was undulating, without a categorized climb. The second half featured two short climbs with a flat 22 km (14 mi) valley in between them. The descent from the second climb, Gerlospass, left a flat 11 km (6.8 mi) to race before the finish in Austria.

The day's breakaway comprised five riders, and it formed after 55 km (34 mi) in the saddle. Their maximum advantage was just under eight minutes. Michele Scarponi and Vasil Kiryienka shed their mates on the second climb of the day, about 60 km (37 mi) from the finish. Scarponi dropped Kiryienka 50 km (31 mi) later and went it alone for the stage win. The pink jersey group absorbed all the other members of the morning breakaway and finished half a minute behind Scarponi, with six from that group gaining four seconds on race leader Danilo Di Luca at the finish. Lance Armstrong lost even more time, finishing 43 seconds behind second place man Edvald Boasson Hagen.

Stage 6 result

	Rider	Team	Time
1	Michele Scarponi (ITA)	Diquigiovanni–Androni	5h 49' 55"
2	Edvald Boasson Hagen (NOR)	Team Columbia–High Road	+ 32"
3	Allan Davis (AUS)	Quick-Step	s.t.
4	Filippo Pozzato (ITA)	Team Katusha	s.t.
5	Matthew Goss (AUS)	Team Saxo Bank	s.t.
6	Philippe Gilbert (BEL)	Silence–Lotto	s.t.
7	Enrico Gasparotto (ITA)	Lampre–NGC	s.t.
8	Michael Rogers (AUS)	Team Columbia–High Road	+ 36"
DSQ	~~Danilo Di Luca (ITA)~~	~~LPR Brakes–Farnese Vini~~	s.t.
DSQ	~~Tadej Valjavec (SLO)~~	~~Ag2r–La Mondiale~~	s.t.

General classification after stage 6

	Rider	Team	Time
DSQ	~~Danilo Di Luca (ITA)~~	~~LPR Brakes–Farnese Vini~~	22h 11' 15"
2	Thomas Lövkvist (SWE)	Team Columbia–High Road	+ 5"
3	Michael Rogers (AUS)	Team Columbia–High Road	+ 36"
4	Levi Leipheimer (USA)	Astana	+ 43"
5	Denis Menchov (RUS)	Rabobank	+ 50"
6	Ivan Basso (ITA)	Liquigas	+ 1' 06"
7	Carlos Sastre (ESP)	Cervélo TestTeam	+ 1' 16"
8	Chris Horner (USA)	Astana	+ 1' 17"
DSQ	~~Franco Pellizotti (ITA)~~	~~Liquigas~~	+ 1' 27"
10	David Arroyo (ESP)	Caisse d'Epargne	+ 1' 41"

== Stage 7 ==
15 May 2009 — Innsbruck (Austria) to Chiavenna, 244 km (152 mi)

The race returned to Italy, after also passing through Switzerland, in another long stage. The one climb of the day occurred a little over 200 km (120 mi) into the stage, the Passo Maloja. The entire stage to that point was on a slight increase in elevation, while the finish was on a long and drastic descent into Chiavenna. Its profile made it seem an inviting stage for breakaway attempts.

This stage saw numerous breakaways get away and stay away for a time. The first of them comprised four riders, coming clear after 24 km (15 mi). This group attained a maximum advantage of over nine minutes, but the peloton was able to catch them before the Passo Maloja. Right at the summit, Alessandro Bertolini attacked and came free for a time. He was able to lengthen his escape somewhat by descending the Passo Maloja in an extremely aerodynamic position, out of the saddle with all his weight over the handlebars. A crucial four-man break took place 12 km (7.5 mi) from the finish line, with Bertolini able to stay with them as they caught him, making it a five-man leading group. Andriy Hryvko tried to make his way up to them after they were well away, but could not make it. Despite the presence of more experienced riders and riders noted as sprinters in the break, it was young Norwegian Edvald Boasson Hagen who made it to the line first.

Controversy had arisen before the Giro when it was revealed that many of Astana's sponsors in Kazakhstan had not paid their full obligations to the team, and that the riders had therefore not been paid their full salaries to that point in the season. In protest, the team wore new jerseys beginning with this stage, that had the names of those underpaying sponsors faded out to the point of being unreadable.

Stage 7 result

	Rider	Team	Time
1	Edvald Boasson Hagen (NOR)	Team Columbia–High Road	5h 56' 53"
2	Robert Hunter (RSA)	Barloworld	s.t.
3	Pavel Brutt (RUS)	Team Katusha	s.t.
4	Davide Viganò (ITA)	Fuji–Servetto	s.t.
5	Alessandro Bertolini (ITA)	Diquigiovanni–Androni	s.t.
6	Andriy Hryvko (UKR)	ISD	+ 31"
7	Matthew Goss (AUS)	Team Saxo Bank	+ 40"
8	Allan Davis (AUS)	Quick-Step	s.t.
9	Robert Förster (GER)	Team Milram	s.t.
10	Ben Swift (GBR)	Team Katusha	s.t.

General classification after stage 7

	Rider	Team	Time
DSQ	~~Danilo Di Luca (ITA)~~	~~LPR Brakes–Farnese Vini~~	28h 08' 48"
2	Thomas Lövkvist (SWE)	Team Columbia–High Road	+ 5"
3	Michael Rogers (AUS)	Team Columbia–High Road	+ 36"
4	Levi Leipheimer (USA)	Astana	+ 43"
5	Denis Menchov (RUS)	Rabobank	+ 50"
6	Ivan Basso (ITA)	Liquigas	+ 1' 06"
7	Carlos Sastre (ESP)	Cervélo TestTeam	+ 1' 16"
8	Chris Horner (USA)	Astana	+ 1' 17"
DSQ	~~Franco Pellizotti (ITA)~~	~~Liquigas~~	+ 1' 27"
10	David Arroyo (ESP)	Caisse d'Epargne	+ 1' 41"

== Stage 8 ==
16 May 2009 — Morbegno to Bergamo, 209 km (130 mi)

There were two categorized climbs on this course, including a fairly tall and steep one at Culmine di San Pietro after 64 km (40 mi). However, the amount of flat racing after the descent suggested that the type of finish this stage would see was far from certain.

Between the 30 km (19 mi) and 40 km (25 mi) marks in this stage, a ten-man breakaway slowly formed. Their maximum advantage was just over four minutes as they neared the day's second climb, the Colle del Gallo. A group of GC favorites and domestiques from their teams were first over this climb, with race leader Danilo Di Luca not among them at first, almost a minute back. As the leading group seemed unwilling to work together, Di Luca was able to bridge the gap and make it to them. Kanstantsin Sivtsov made the decisive attack of the day, coming clear some 15 km (9.3 mi) from the line, and though he never held even half a minute's advantage, he managed to stay away for the stage win.

This stage also saw a dramatic and life-threatening crash from Pedro Horrillo, on the Culmine di San Pietro. His bike skidded on wet leaves during the descent, causing him to lose control of his machine, slide into a guardrail, and tumble head over heels down the mountainside. Horrillo fell 60 m (200 ft) and sustained fractures to his thighbones, kneecaps, and T12 and C3 vertebrae, as well as a punctured lung and internal bleeding. He was airlifted off the mountain and was then taken by ambulance to a nearby hospital. Horrillo woke up in the ambulance, but was put in a chemically induced coma to aid his treatment. He was taken out of the coma the next day, with scans revealing no brain damage. The peloton's protest of Stage 9 the next day was largely in reaction to Horrillo's serious injury.

After spending some five weeks in hospitals both in Italy and his native Spain, Horrillo eventually recovered.

Stage 8 result

	Rider	Team	Time
1	Kanstantsin Sivtsov (BLR)	Team Columbia–High Road	5h 04' 34"
2	Edvald Boasson Hagen (NOR)	Team Columbia–High Road	+ 21"
DSQ	~~Danilo Di Luca (ITA)~~	~~LPR Brakes–Farnese Vini~~	s.t.
4	Michael Rogers (AUS)	Team Columbia–High Road	s.t.
DSQ	~~Franco Pellizotti (ITA)~~	~~Liquigas~~	s.t.
6	Stefano Garzelli (ITA)	Acqua & Sapone–Caffè Mokambo	s.t.
7	Damiano Cunego (ITA)	Lampre–NGC	s.t.
8	Jackson Rodríguez (VEN)	Diquigiovanni–Androni	s.t.
9	Marzio Bruseghin (ITA)	Lampre–NGC	s.t.
10	Thomas Rohregger (AUT)	Team Milram	s.t.

General classification after stage 8

	Rider	Team	Time
DSQ	~~Danilo Di Luca (ITA)~~	~~LPR Brakes–Farnese Vini~~	33h 13' 35"
2	Thomas Lövkvist (SWE)	Team Columbia–High Road	+ 13"
3	Michael Rogers (AUS)	Team Columbia–High Road	+ 44"
4	Levi Leipheimer (USA)	Astana	+ 51"
5	Denis Menchov (RUS)	Rabobank	+ 58"
6	Ivan Basso (ITA)	Liquigas	+ 1' 14"
7	Carlos Sastre (ESP)	Cervélo TestTeam	+ 1' 24"
8	Chris Horner (USA)	Astana	+ 1' 25"
DSQ	~~Franco Pellizotti (ITA)~~	~~Liquigas~~	+ 1' 35"
10	David Arroyo (ESP)	Caisse d'Epargne	+ 1' 49"

== Stage 9 ==
17 May 2009 — Milan, 165 km (103 mi) (Milano Show 100)

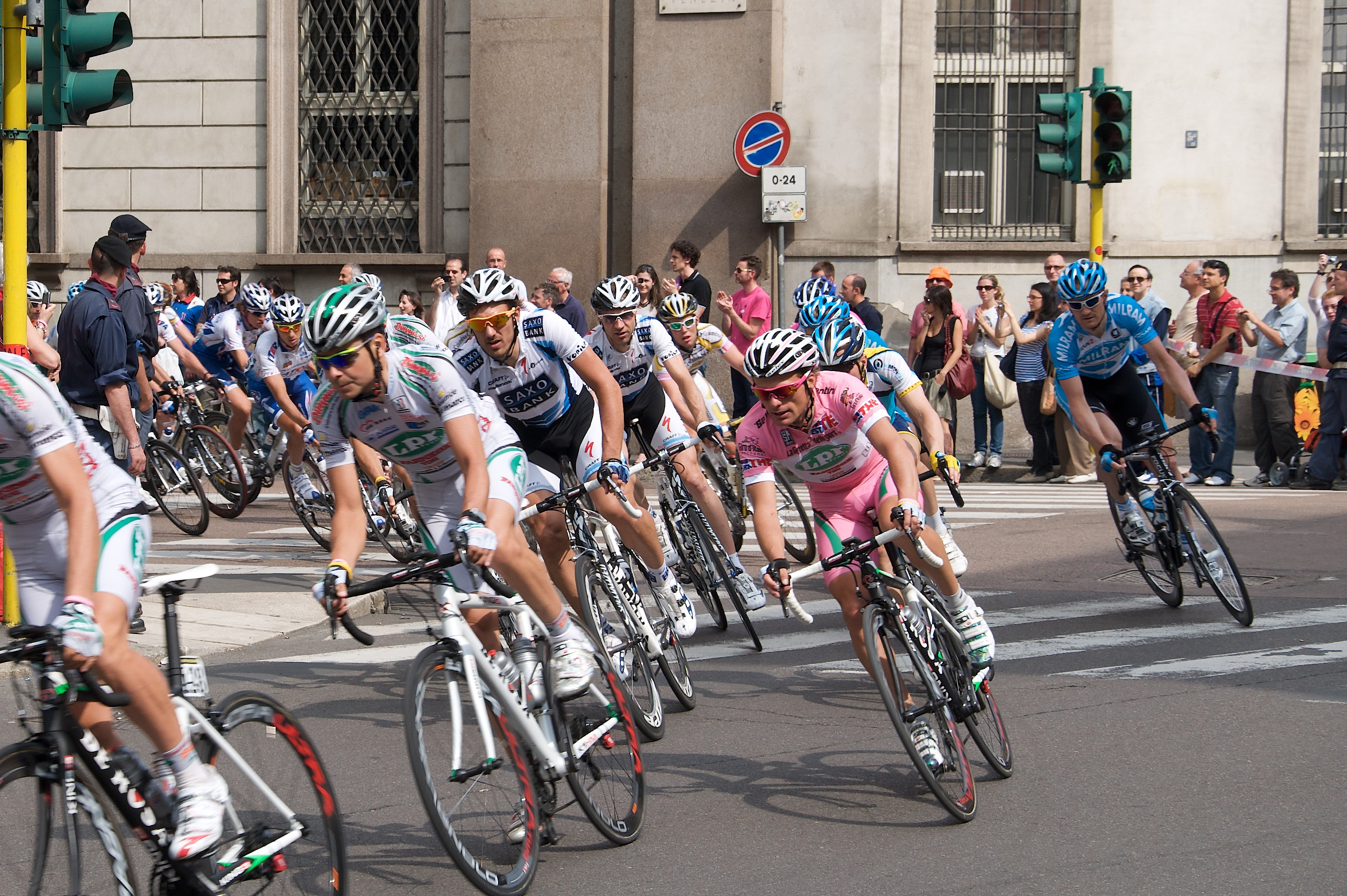
Danilo Di Luca in the pink jersey during the Milan city stage.

This stage was a circuit race. The field took 10 laps of a 16 km (9.9 mi) course in Milan (there was a 5 km (3.1 mi) run-in before the circuits began). The course was flat, and the stage figured to be a major sprinters' battle.

The character of this stage changed drastically after the dramatic injury sustained by Pedro Horrillo the day before brought attention to safety conditions on this and other courses in the Giro. With the course passing over numerous different surfaces, including tram tracks and cobblestones, the peloton collectively protested racing this course, and as such it was neutralized, with everyone receiving the same time as the stage winner and no points were awarded for the points classification as had been planned. There were also parked cars at the side of the road in many places, forcing the riders into narrow tunnels to get through them.

Originally, the result of the riders' protest was only that the stage times would not count. The peloton rode the first four laps very slowly, about 20 km/h (12 mph) slower than previous stages, and at the end of the fourth lap, the race stopped altogether as race leader Danilo Di Luca took a microphone to address the crowd and explain why they were riding so slowly. Lance Armstrong, who along with Di Luca had been considered the voice of the peloton in the protest, apologized to the fans for the effect it had on what was supposed to be a grand spectacle, but also contended that it was the correct decision for the peloton to make.

The pace did eventually pick up, on the last lap, and the finish was contested in a bunched sprint, won by Mark Cavendish.

Stage 9 result

	Rider	Team	Time
1	Mark Cavendish (GBR)	Team Columbia–High Road	4h 16' 13"
2	Allan Davis (AUS)	Quick-Step	s.t.
3	Tyler Farrar (USA)	Garmin–Slipstream	s.t.
4	Matthew Goss (AUS)	Team Saxo Bank	s.t.
5	Alessandro Petacchi (ITA)	LPR Brakes–Farnese Vini	s.t.
6	Robert Förster (GER)	Team Milram	s.t.
7	Robert Hunter (RSA)	Barloworld	s.t.
8	Davide Viganò (ITA)	Fuji–Servetto	s.t.
9	Saïd Haddou (FRA)	Bbox Bouygues Telecom	s.t.
10	Markus Fothen (GER)	Team Milram	s.t.

General classification after stage 9

	Rider	Team	Time
DSQ	~~Danilo Di Luca (ITA)~~	~~LPR Brakes–Farnese Vini~~	37h 29' 48"
2	Thomas Lövkvist (SWE)	Team Columbia–High Road	+ 13"
3	Michael Rogers (AUS)	Team Columbia–High Road	+ 44"
4	Levi Leipheimer (USA)	Astana	+ 51"
5	Denis Menchov (RUS)	Rabobank	+ 58"
6	Ivan Basso (ITA)	Liquigas	+ 1' 14"
7	Carlos Sastre (ESP)	Cervélo TestTeam	+ 1' 24"
8	Chris Horner (USA)	Astana	+ 1' 25"
DSQ	~~Franco Pellizotti (ITA)~~	~~Liquigas~~	+ 1' 35"
10	David Arroyo (ESP)	Caisse d'Epargne	+ 1' 49"

== Stage 10 ==
19 May 2009 — Cuneo to Pinerolo, 262 km (163 mi)

After the rest day, the riders were faced with the Giro's longest stage, with numerous high mountain climbs along the course and the distinction of being the race's queen stage. It was originally scheduled to include the Col d'Izoard, which has been featured numerous times in the Tour de France as an hors catégorie climb. Race officials later decided to alter the course, staying on the Italian side of the Alps, believing the stretches that were to take place in France were too remote and that radio communication in the area could not be assured. The course as it originally was designed mimicked exactly a course used in the 1949 Giro d'Italia.

The resulting alterations caused the course to be even longer than first planned, 262 km (163 mi) rather than 250 km (160 mi), with a small categorized climb just under 10 km (6.2 mi) from the finish. This came after a 50 km (31 mi) long descent from what became the course's principal climb, Sestrière. The race's overall contenders were expected to distinguish themselves on this stage.

A surprisingly fast beginning to the stage, with a first hour that covered over 50 km (31 mi), managed to keep any breakaways from going clear for over two hours. Twelve eventually came ahead of the peloton, with seven in the lead and five chasing between the leaders and the peloton. The third group on the road eventually dwindled to a select contingent of overall favorites, which included race leader Danilo Di Luca. Former Giro champion Stefano Garzelli attacked from this group on the day's first climb and got to the leading group of five before the summit, claiming maximum points on it and on Sestrière to gain leadership of the mountains classification at the end of the day. Garzelli's maximum advantage, at the summit of Sestrière, was just over six minutes.

A group of most of the top riders in the GC, paced by the race leader himself, caught every one of the twelve initial leaders, and subsequently Garzelli just before the day's last climb, Prà Martino. Di Luca's aggressive descent of Prà Martino gave him a gap over the elite group of riders who had been able to hold his wheel to that point, and the stage win. The day saw a big winner in time gains and a big loser: Lance Armstrong finished 29 seconds behind Di Luca in the same group as the man finishing sixth on the stage, gaining seven places in the GC, while Thomas Lövkvist lost over a minute and fell from second to eighth in the GC.

Stage 10 result

	Rider	Team	Time
DSQ	~~Danilo Di Luca (ITA)~~	~~LPR Brakes–Farnese Vini~~	~~6h 30' 43"~~
DSQ	~~Franco Pellizotti (ITA)~~	~~Liquigas~~	~~6h 30' 53"~~
1	Denis Menchov (RUS)	Rabobank	6h 30' 53"
4	Carlos Sastre (ESP)	Cervélo TestTeam	s.t.
5	David Arroyo (ESP)	Caisse d'Epargne	+ 16"
6	Mauricio Soler (COL)	Barloworld	+ 19"
7	Ivan Basso (ITA)	Liquigas	s.t.
8	Levi Leipheimer (USA)	Astana	s.t.
9	Joaquim Rodríguez (ESP)	Caisse d'Epargne	s.t.
10	Michael Rogers (AUS)	Team Columbia–High Road	s.t.

General classification after stage 10

	Rider	Team	Time
DSQ	~~Danilo Di Luca (ITA)~~	~~LPR Brakes–Farnese Vini~~	44h 00' 11"
2	Denis Menchov (RUS)	Rabobank	+ 1' 20"
3	Michael Rogers (AUS)	Team Columbia–High Road	+ 1' 33"
4	Levi Leipheimer (USA)	Astana	+ 1' 40"
DSQ	~~Franco Pellizotti (ITA)~~	~~Liquigas~~	+ 1' 53"
6	Carlos Sastre (ESP)	Cervélo TestTeam	+ 1' 54"
7	Ivan Basso (ITA)	Liquigas	+ 2' 03"
8	Thomas Lövkvist (SWE)	Team Columbia–High Road	+ 2' 12"
9	David Arroyo (ESP)	Caisse d'Epargne	+ 2' 35"
10	Gilberto Simoni (ITA)	Diquigiovanni–Androni	+ 2' 58"

== Stage 11 ==
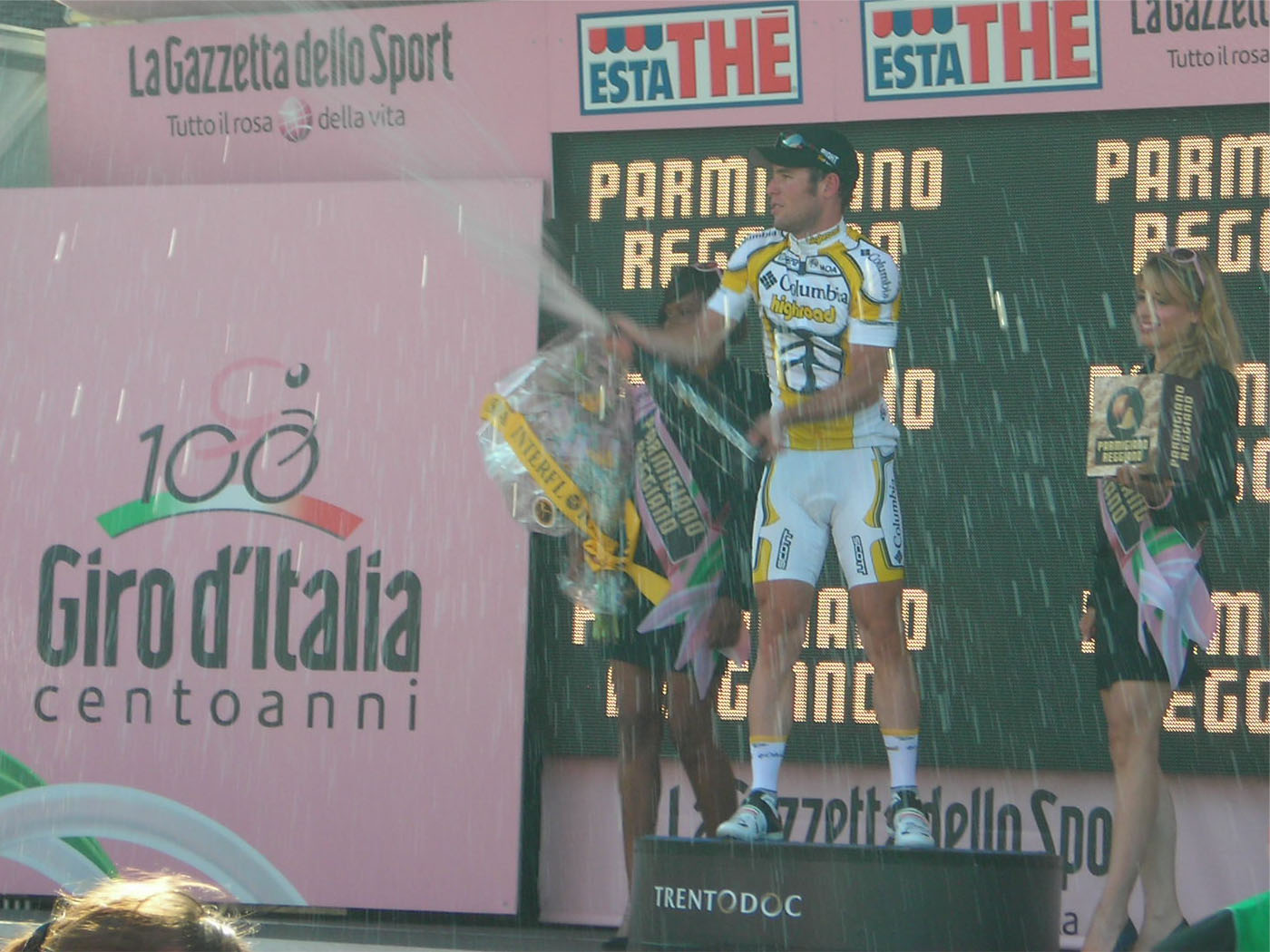
Mark Cavendish popping a champagne bottle on the podium in Arenzano after his victory.

20 May 2009 — Turin to Arenzano, 214 km (133 mi)

The Passo del Turchino, famous for its use every year in the classic one-day race Milan–San Remo, was visited 19 km (12 mi) from the end of this stage. The climb is not difficult enough to be at all selective, so pre-stage analysis led to expectations that either a mass sprint would occur or a breakaway of riders deep down in the GC would finish first on this stage.

Astana rider Chris Horner did not start the stage due to a leg injury sustained in a fall in Stage 10, leaving Levi Leipheimer and Lance Armstrong without their usual support rider. At the 56 km (35 mi) mark, Caisse d'Epargne rider Joaquim Rodríguez dropped out after a 9th-place finish in the previous stage.

A break formed after 65 km (40 mi), including Gustavo César, Cameron Meyer, Dmytro Grabovskyy and Alessandro Donati. Soon after, Levi Leipheimer crashed, but was unhurt. The break was caught, and a solo break was formed by Vladimir Isaichev. Astana drove the peloton up the Turchino, the day's lone climb, with Armstrong leading the descent and race leader Danilo Di Luca somewhat surprisingly coming forward to hold Armstrong's wheel. Some riders tried to escape for victory on the way into Arenzano, but the sprinters' teams worked to keep the field together, and Mark Cavendish took another bunched sprint win over Tyler Farrar and Alessandro Petacchi.

It was after this stage, on the eve of the Cinque Terre time trial, that Danilo Di Luca gave his first of two positive tests for continuous erythropoiesis receptor activator (CERA), the results of which became public after the Giro was over.

Stage 11 result

	Rider	Team	Time
1	Mark Cavendish (GBR)	Team Columbia–High Road	4h 51' 17"
2	Tyler Farrar (USA)	Garmin–Slipstream	s.t.
3	Alessandro Petacchi (ITA)	LPR Brakes–Farnese Vini	s.t.
4	Allan Davis (AUS)	Quick-Step	s.t.
5	Sébastien Hinault (FRA)	Ag2r–La Mondiale	s.t.
6	Davide Viganò (ITA)	Fuji–Servetto	s.t.
7	Edvald Boasson Hagen (NOR)	Team Columbia–High Road	s.t.
8	Alexander Serov (RUS)	Team Katusha	s.t.
9	Oscar Gatto (ITA)	ISD	s.t.
10	Robert Förster (GER)	Team Milram	s.t.

General classification after stage 11

	Rider	Team	Time
DSQ	~~Danilo Di Luca (ITA)~~	~~LPR Brakes–Farnese Vini~~	48h 51' 28"
2	Denis Menchov (RUS)	Rabobank	+ 1' 20"
3	Michael Rogers (AUS)	Team Columbia–High Road	+ 1' 33"
4	Levi Leipheimer (USA)	Astana	+ 1' 40"
DSQ	~~Franco Pellizotti (ITA)~~	~~Liquigas~~	+ 1' 53"
6	Carlos Sastre (ESP)	Cervélo TestTeam	+ 1' 54"
7	Ivan Basso (ITA)	Liquigas	+ 2' 03"
8	Thomas Lövkvist (SWE)	Team Columbia–High Road	+ 2' 12"
9	David Arroyo (ESP)	Caisse d'Epargne	+ 2' 35"
10	Gilberto Simoni (ITA)	Diquigiovanni–Androni	+ 2' 58"
