= Cimon della Pala =

Mountain in Italy

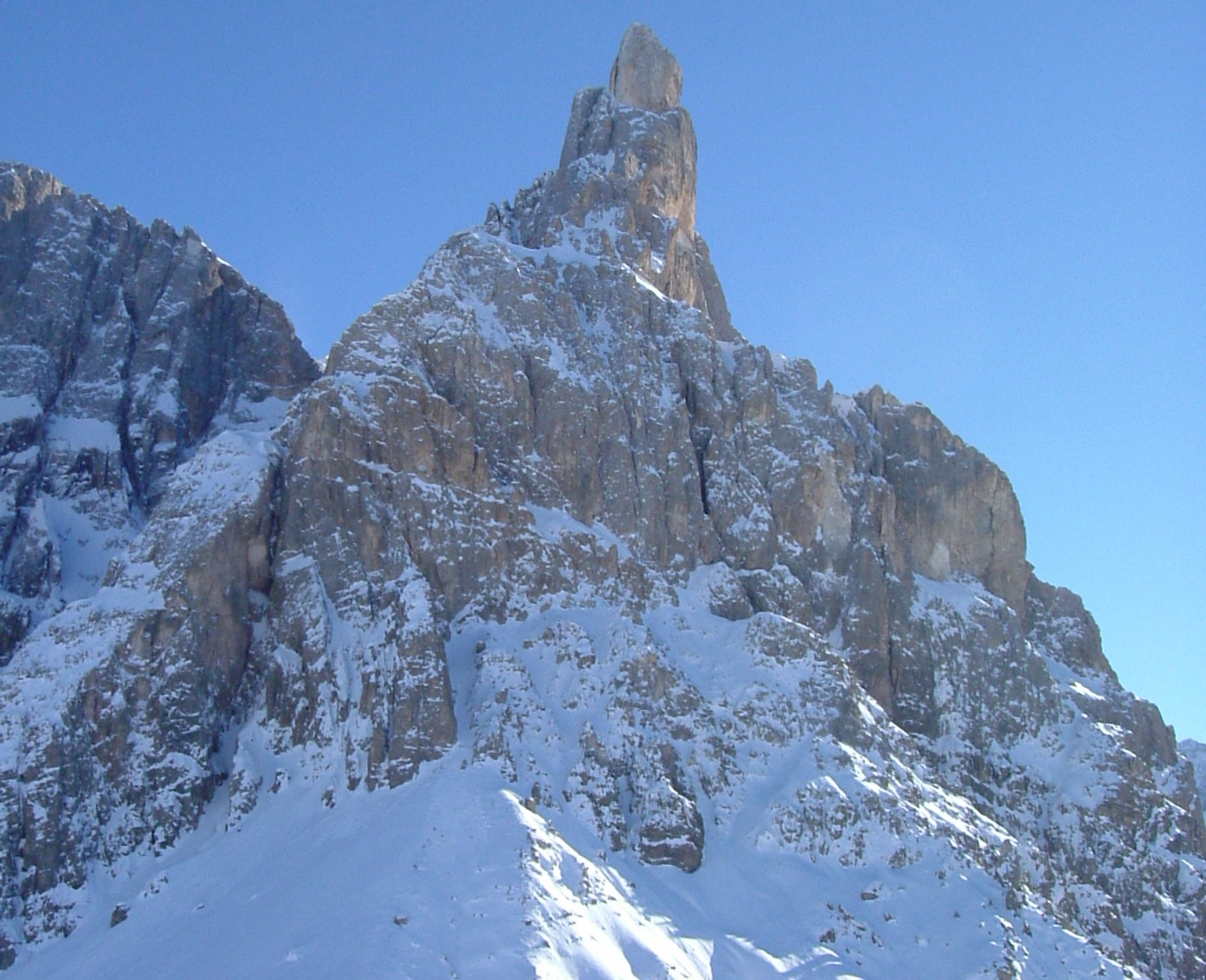
- Cimon della Pala, seen from the Rolle Pass

Highest point
- Elevation: 3,184 m (10,446 ft)
- Prominence: 259 m (850 ft)
- Coordinates: 46°17′10″N 11°49′16″E

Geography
- Location within Italy
- Location: Italy
- Parent range: Pale di San Martino, Dolomites

Climbing
- First ascent: 3 June 1870 by Edward Robson Whitwell, Santo Siorpaes and Christian Lauener
- Easiest route: Variation for the Summit (rock/mixed climb)

Cimon della Pala, sometimes called Cimone and The Matterhorn of the Dolomites (il Cervino delle Dolomiti), is the best-known peak of the Pale di San Martino group, in the Dolomites, northern Italy. Although it is not the highest peak of the group, the Cima Vezzana being a few metres higher, its slender point, which can be seen from the Rolle Pass, dominates the landscape.

== Location ==
The mountain lies near the town of Tonadico in Trentino, the southern part of the Trentino-Alto Adige/Südtirol, and is the watershed between the Cismón valley and the Travignolo valley. It is the northernmost peak in the chain of the Pale di San Martino and is flanked by the Vezzana. Between the high, steep walls of the two peaks and descending to the north, lies a steep glacier called Travignolo, which is the source of a river of the same name, a tributary of the Avisio.

== Route ==
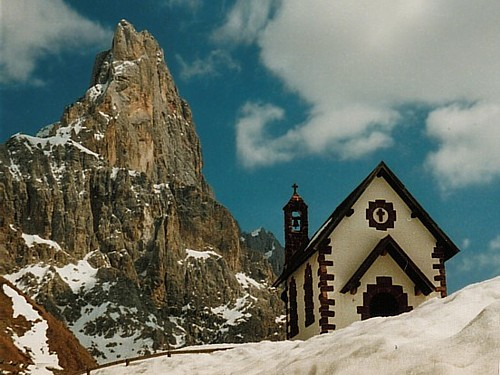
Another view

The peak can be attained by a route which, while easy, requires good experience, called the "Variation for the Summit". This departs from a bivouac shelter called Fiamme Gialle, at a height of 3,005 metres, which is reached by the Bolver-Lugli via ferrata, not technically demanding, but tiring. This mountain route, equipped with fixed cables, stemples, ladders, and bridges, was constructed by a group of mountain guides from San Martino di Castrozza, known in the mountaineering world as the Eagles of San Martino, to mark the centenary in 1970 of the first ascent of the peak on 3 June 1870 by Edward Robson Whitwell and his guides Santo Siorpaes, of nearby Cortina d'Ampezzo, and Christian Lauener of Lauterbrunnen.

A good access to the via ferrata is by way of the gondola lift from San Martino di Castrozza to Colverde, which operates between the middle of June and the end of September .

== History ==
The mountain brought the first tourists into the Primiero valley. In 1862, British travellers Josiah Gilbert and George Cheetham Churchill saw a picture of the Cimon della Pala in an inn. Fascinated by it, they wanted to see it at first hand, and wrote of it in their account The Dolomite Mountains: Excursions Through Tyrol, Carinthia, Carniola & Friuli (London, 1864). In later years there was an influx of tourists, at first mostly from outside Italy, who were interested in the whole chain of the Pale.

The mountain can be seen on the coat of arms (pictured) of the Guardia di Finanza, an Italian law enforcement agency which is one of the Italian Armed Forces and which has its Alpine School not far from the Cimon della Pala.

Arms of the Guardia di Finanza, showing the Cimon della Pala
