= Rolle Pass =

High mountain pass in Trentino, Italy

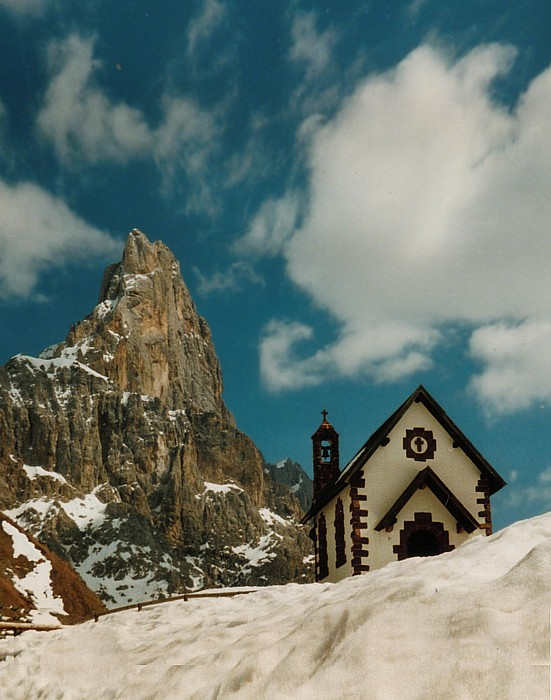
- Chapel at Rolle Pass, with Cimon della Pala

- Location within Alps
- Elevation: 1,989 metres (6,526 ft)

Third Approach
- Location: Trentino, Italy
- Range: Dolomites
- Coordinates: 46°17′47″N 11°47′13″E

The Rolle Pass (Italian: Passo Rolle) (1989 m) is a mountain pass in Trentino in Italy which can be reached by motor vehicles.

It connects the Fiemme and Primiero valleys, and the communities of Predazzo, San Martino di Castrozza and Fiera di Primiero. The pass road was built between 1863 and 1874, when the area still belonged to Austria-Hungary. The pass lies within the Parco Naturale Paneveggio - Pale di San Martino.

== Climate ==
Due to altitude, the climate is subarctic (Köppen: Dfc), similar to other high mountains in the Alps. The annual average temperature is 3.2 °C (37.8 °F), the hottest month in July is 11.8 °C (53.2 °F), and the coldest month is −4.4 °C (24.1 °F) in February. The annual precipitation is 1,004.11 millimetres (39.53 in), of which October is the wettest with 142.23 millimetres (5.60 in), while February is the driest with only 29.05 millimetres (1.14 in).

Climate data for Rolle Pass, elevation: 2,004 m or 6,575 ft, 1991-2020 normals, extremes 1949–present
Month	Jan	Feb	Mar	Apr	May	Jun	Jul	Aug	Sep	Oct	Nov	Dec	Year
Record high °C (°F)	10.6 (51.1)	12.0 (53.6)	12.6 (54.7)	16.4 (61.5)	21.0 (69.8)	23.2 (73.8)	25.4 (77.7)	24.4 (75.9)	21.4 (70.5)	19.2 (66.6)	15.2 (59.4)	12.5 (54.5)	25.4 (77.7)
Mean daily maximum °C (°F)	−1.3 (29.7)	−1.1 (30.0)	1.6 (34.9)	4.7 (40.5)	9.3 (48.7)	13.9 (57.0)	16.2 (61.2)	15.9 (60.6)	11.4 (52.5)	7.4 (45.3)	2.8 (37.0)	−0.3 (31.5)	6.7 (44.1)
Daily mean °C (°F)	−3.9 (25.0)	−4.4 (24.1)	−2.1 (28.2)	0.9 (33.6)	5.3 (41.5)	9.5 (49.1)	11.8 (53.2)	11.7 (53.1)	7.8 (46.0)	4.3 (39.7)	0.0 (32.0)	−2.9 (26.8)	3.2 (37.8)
Mean daily minimum °C (°F)	−6.8 (19.8)	−7.7 (18.1)	−5.2 (22.6)	−2.1 (28.2)	2.1 (35.8)	6.0 (42.8)	8.2 (46.8)	8.4 (47.1)	4.9 (40.8)	1.7 (35.1)	−2.5 (27.5)	−5.7 (21.7)	0.1 (32.2)
Record low °C (°F)	−23.4 (−10.1)	−24.2 (−11.6)	−24.8 (−12.6)	−17.0 (1.4)	−11.1 (12.0)	−6.2 (20.8)	−2.2 (28.0)	−2.8 (27.0)	−5.6 (21.9)	−11.0 (12.2)	−17.2 (1.0)	−19.0 (−2.2)	−24.8 (−12.6)
Average precipitation mm (inches)	34.4 (1.35)	29.1 (1.15)	42.9 (1.69)	68.7 (2.70)	99.5 (3.92)	106.5 (4.19)	111.6 (4.39)	131.6 (5.18)	104.8 (4.13)	142.2 (5.60)	90.5 (3.56)	42.5 (1.67)	1,004.1 (39.53)
Average precipitation days (≥ 1.0 mm)	4.56	5.17	6.20	9.80	11.50	11.84	12.16	12.26	9.19	8.39	6.89	4.88	102.84
Average relative humidity (%)	61.1	63.0	67.3	70.3	71.2	71.0	71.3	72.8	73.5	71.4	67.2	60.9	68.4
Average dew point °C (°F)	−11.7 (10.9)	−11.6 (11.1)	−8.0 (17.6)	−4.2 (24.4)	0.3 (32.5)	4.2 (39.6)	6.5 (43.7)	6.8 (44.2)	3.3 (37.9)	−1.2 (29.8)	−6.4 (20.5)	−11.2 (11.8)	−2.8 (27.0)
Source 1: NOAA
Source 2: Temperature estreme in Passo Rolle

== See also ==
- List of highest paved roads in Europe
- List of mountain passes
