= Primiero San Martino di Castrozza =

- Comune
- Comune di Primiero San Martino di Castrozza
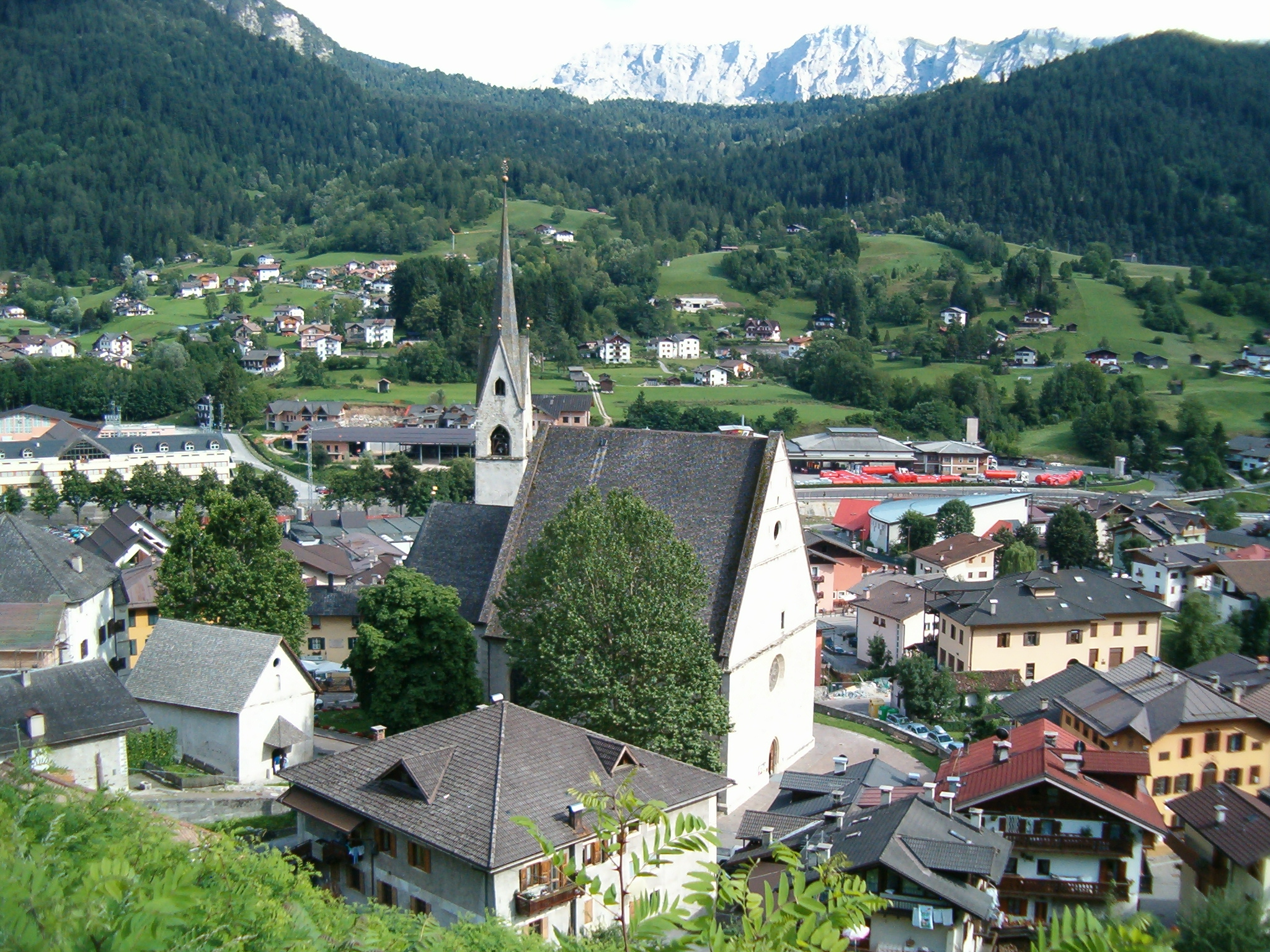

- Location within Italy Location within Trentino-Alto Adige/Südtirol
- Coordinates: 46°10′37.56″N 11°47′47.28″E
- Country: Italy
- Region: Trentino-Alto Adige/Südtirol
- Province: Trentino (TN)
- Frazioni: Fiera di Primiero, Nolesca, Passo Rolle, Pieve, San Martino di Castrozza, Siror, Tonadico, Transacqua

Government
  - Mayor: Daniele Depaoli

Area
  - Total: 200.74 km^{2} (77.51 sq mi)
- Elevation: 710 m (2,330 ft)

Population (2017)
  - Total: 5,401
  - Density: 26.91/km^{2} (69.68/sq mi)
- Time zone: UTC+1 (CET)
  - Summer (DST): UTC+2 (CEST)
- Postal code: 38054
- Dialing code: 0439
- Website: Official website

Primiero San Martino di Castrozza is a comune (municipality) in the Province of Trentino in the Italian region Trentino-Alto Adige/Südtirol.

It was established on 1 January 2016 by the merger of the municipalities of Fiera di Primiero, Siror, Tonadico and Transacqua.
