= Casada =

Casada or Casàda may refer to:

- Casàda, Italian cheese produced in Trentino
- Casada (cheese), Italian cheese produced in Sardinia
- Casada (Santo Stefano di Cadore) frazione of Santo Stefano di Cadore, Italy
