= Sagron Mis =

- Comune
- Comune di Sagron Mis
- Location within Italy Location within Trentino-Alto Adige/Südtirol
- Coordinates: 46°12′N 11°57′E
- Country: Italy
- Region: Trentino-Alto Adige/Südtirol
- Province: Trentino (TN)
- Frazioni: Matiuz, Pante, Vori

Government
  - Mayor: Marco Depaoli

Area
  - Total: 11.2 km^{2} (4.3 sq mi)
- Elevation: 1,066 m (3,497 ft)

Population (Dec. 2004)
  - Total: 211
  - Density: 18.8/km^{2} (48.8/sq mi)
- Demonym: Gnodoli
- Time zone: UTC+1 (CET)
  - Summer (DST): UTC+2 (CEST)
- Postal code: 38050
- Dialing code: 0439
- Website: Official website

Sagron Mis (Sagrón in local dialect) is a comune (municipality) in Trentino in the northern Italian region Trentino-Alto Adige/Südtirol, located about 70 kilometres (43 mi) east of Trento. As of 31 December 2004, it had a population of 211 and an area of 11.2 square kilometres (4.3 mi^{2}).

The municipality of Sagron Mis contains the frazioni (subdivisions, mainly villages and hamlets) Matiuz, Pante (Penns) and Vori.

Sagron Mis borders the following municipalities: Gosaldo, Cesiomaggiore, Tonadico and Transacqua.

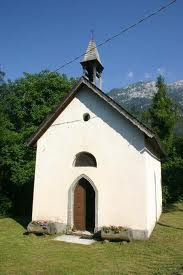
The little church of Our Lady of Caravaggio

== Demographic evolution ==
Historical population

Year	Pop.	±%
1861	?	—
1871	?	—
1881	?	—
1901	?	—
1911	?	—

Year	Pop.	±%
1921	515	—
1931	452	−12.2%
1936	433	−4.2%
1951	393	−9.2%
1961	374	−4.8%

Year	Pop.	±%
1971	302	−19.3%
1981	245	−18.9%
1991	220	−10.2%
2001	207	−5.9%

Source: Data from ISTAT
