= Casàda =

Italian cheese

Casàda is a typical dish from Primiero, in Trentino, Italy; it is prepared in two versions: casàda con la tenza (i.e. with curd) and casàda con la pojna (i.e. with ricotta).

In the first case, a piece of freshly made cow's milk curd is taken from the mass before breaking, and then covered with semi-whipped cream; in the second, fresh ricotta is used instead of curd. In both cases, it is eaten freshly made or within two days.

The name derives from the term casàde, which in the local dialect indicates all the operations carried out by the cheesemaker.

It is recognised as a prodotto agroalimentare tradizionale.
