= Siror =

- Frazione
- Comune di Siror
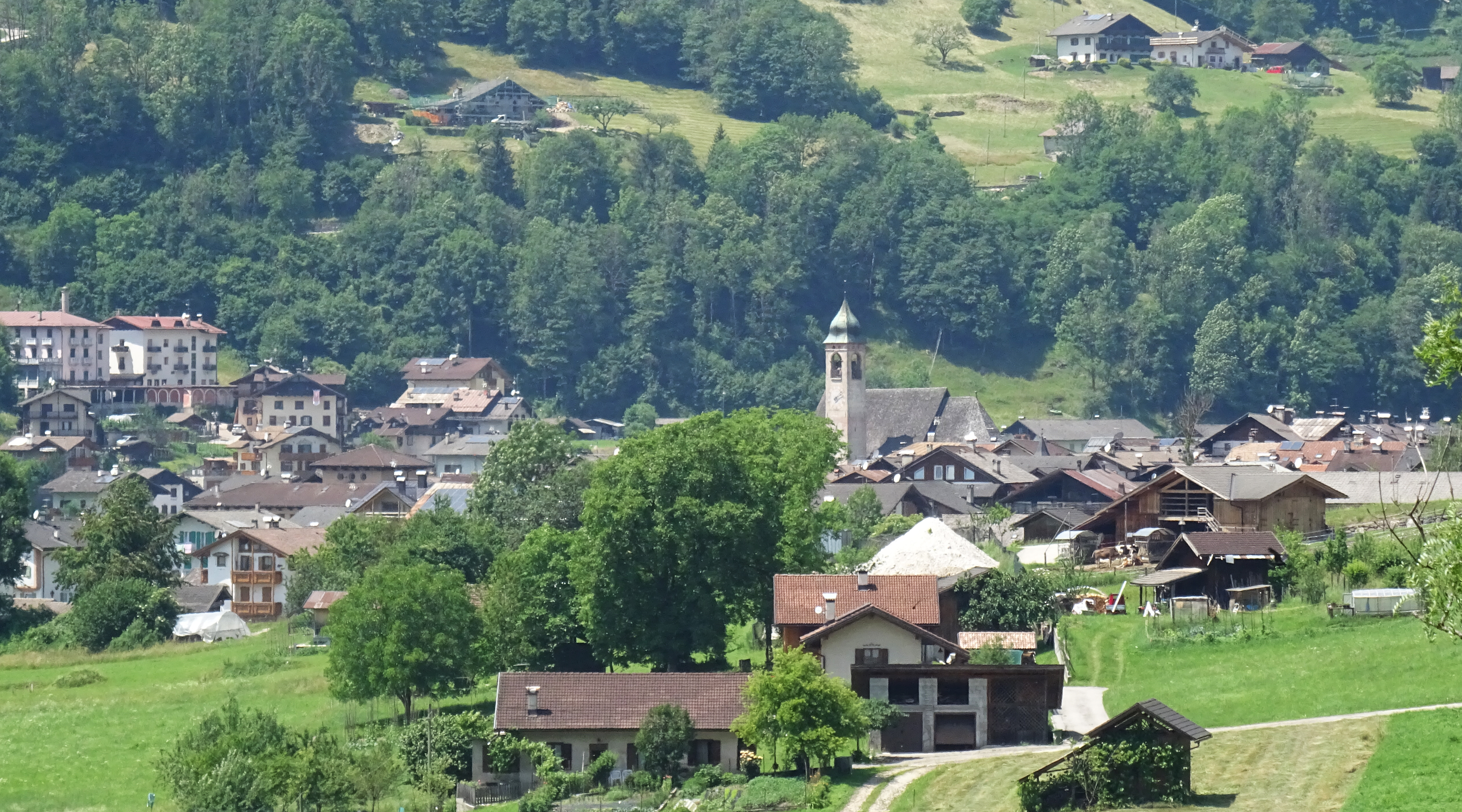

- Location of Siror in Italy
- Coordinates: 46°11′N 11°50′E
- Country: Italy
- Region: Trentino-Alto Adige/Südtirol
- Province: Trentino (TN)

Area
  - Total: 75.1 km^{2} (29.0 sq mi)
- Elevation: 765 m (2,510 ft)

Population (Dec. 2004)
  - Total: 1,244
  - Density: 16.6/km^{2} (42.9/sq mi)
- Demonym: Siroreri
- Time zone: UTC+1 (CET)
  - Summer (DST): UTC+2 (CEST)
- Postal code: 38054
- Dialing code: 0439

Siror (Siror in local dialect) was a comune (municipality) in Trentino in the northern Italian region Trentino-Alto Adige/Südtirol, located about 60 kilometres (37 mi) east of Trento. As of 31 December 2004, it had a population of 1,244 and an area of 75.1 square kilometres (29.0 mi^{2}). It was merged with Fiera di Primiero, Tonadico and Transacqua on January 1, 2016, to form a new municipality, Primiero San Martino di Castrozza.

The municipality of Siror contains the frazioni (subdivisions) Nolesca and part of San Martino di Castrozza.

Siror borders the following municipalities: Canale d'Agordo, Predazzo, Canal San Bovo, Mezzano, Imer, Tonadico and Transacqua.

== Demographic evolution ==
Historical population

Year	Pop.	±%
1861	?	—
1871	?	—
1881	?	—
1901	?	—
1911	?	—

Year	Pop.	±%
1921	1,135	—
1931	1,176	+3.6%
1936	1,220	+3.7%
1951	1,211	−0.7%
1961	1,138	−6.0%

Year	Pop.	±%
1971	1,193	+4.8%
1981	1,193	+0.0%
1991	1,172	−1.8%
2001	1,224	+4.4%

Source: Data from ISTAT
