= San Martino di Castrozza =

- Frazione
- Location of San Martino di Castrozza in Italy
- Coordinates: 46°16′N 11°48′E
- Country: Italy
- Region: Trentino-Alto Adige/Südtirol
- Province: Trentino
- Comune: Siror; Tonadico
- Elevation: 1,487 m (4,879 ft)

Population (2001)
  - Total: 563
- Time zone: UTC+1 (CET)
  - Summer (DST): UTC+2 (CEST)
- Postal code: 38054
- Dialing code: +39 0439

San Martino di Castrozza is a mountain resort in the Primiero valley in the Trentino province in Italy. The western part, with 428 inhabitants, is in the comune of Siror, with the eastern, housing 135 inhabitants, in Tonadico.

== History ==
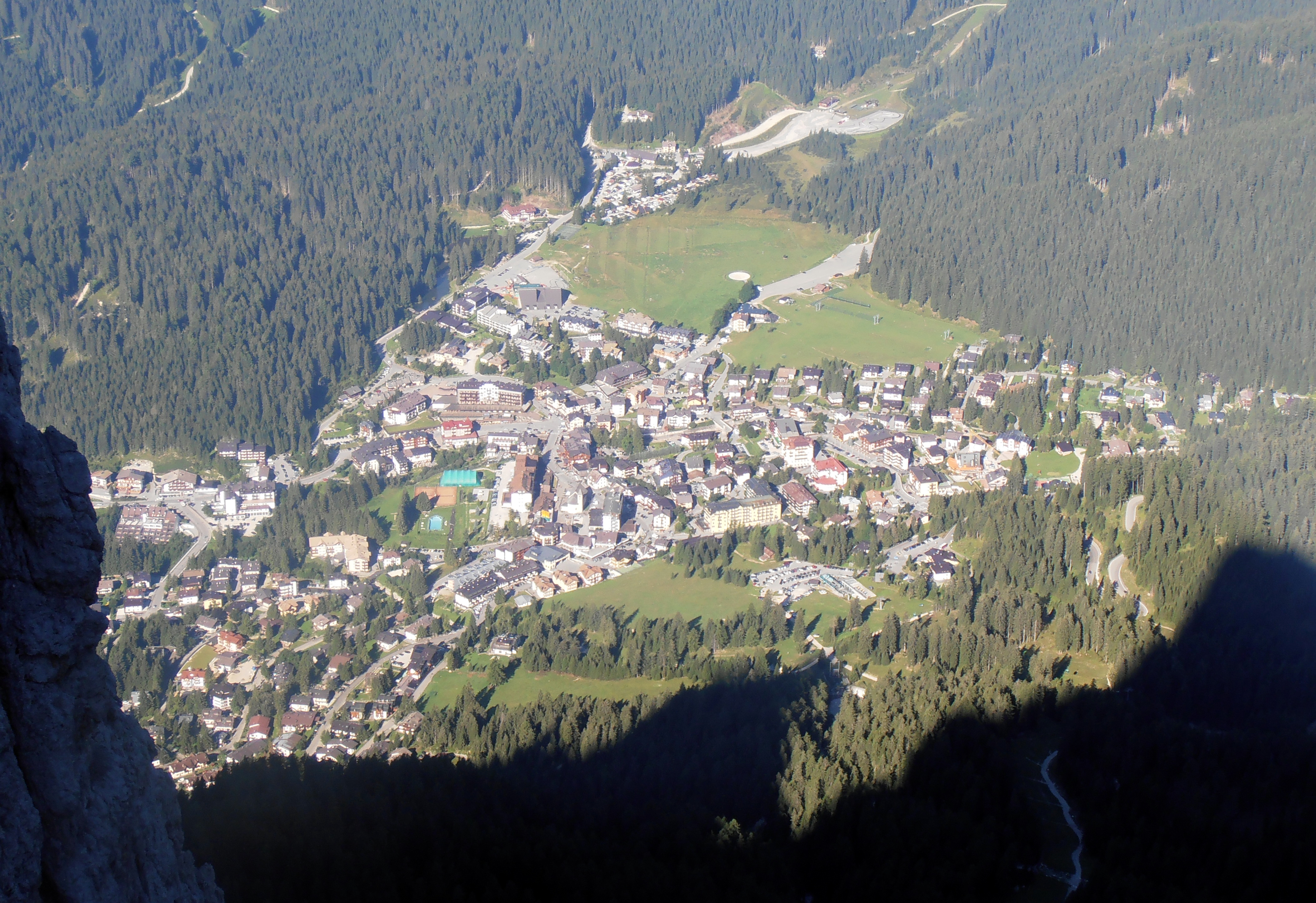
San Martino di Castrozza

The first buildings on the site of San Martino were a religious institution, the hospice of saints Martino and Giuliano, which welcomed travelers crossing the Alps by the Rolle Pass between the valleys of Primiero and Fiemme. All that remains of the hospice is the church of San Martino, which has a romanesque bell-tower.

The first alpine hotel in San Martino was built by the Irish traveller, John Ball in 1873. By the 1900s, San Martino di Castrozza was already established as a tourist destination for the wealthy of the Austro-Hungarian Empire, of which Trentino then formed part. The resort was rebuilt after the devastation of the First World War, and grew rapidly thereafter.

== Geography ==
San Martino is situated in a valley of green meadows, in the Paneveggio-Pale di San Martino Natural Park. It is surrounded by peaks of the Dolomites, including the Pale di San Martino, of which the highest peaks are Vezzana and the Cimon della Pala.

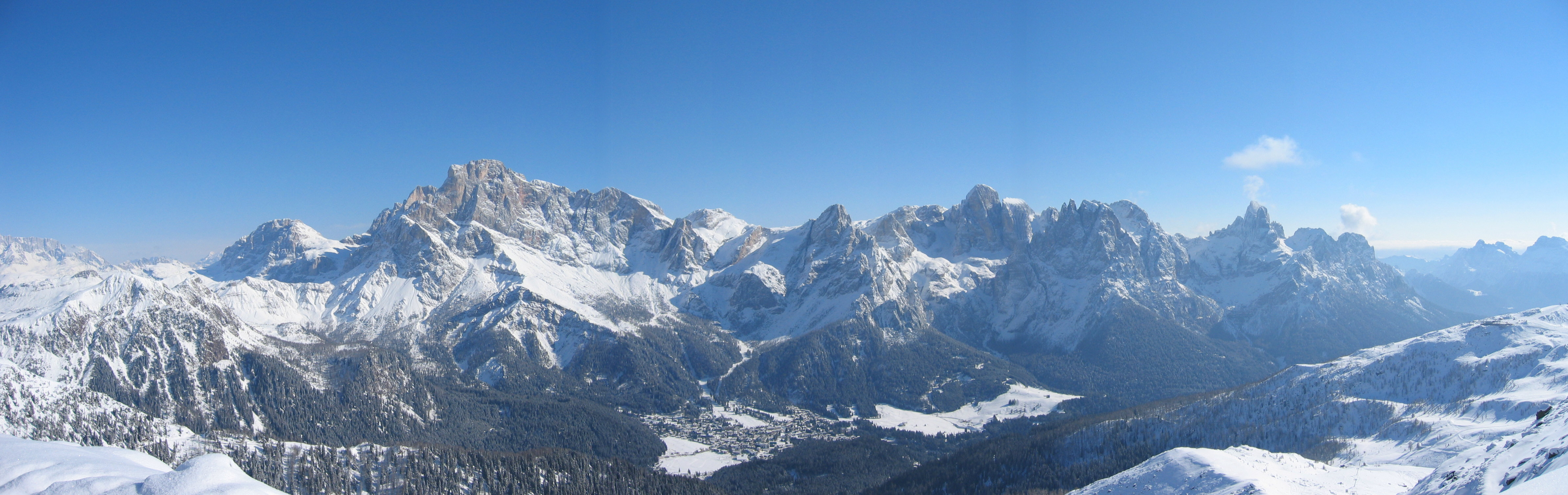
San Martino di Castrozza surrounded by the Pale

== In culture ==
- Arthur Schnitzler's 1924 novella Fräulein Else is set in San Martino di Castrozza.
