= Transacqua =

Transaqua
- Comune
- Comune di Transaqua
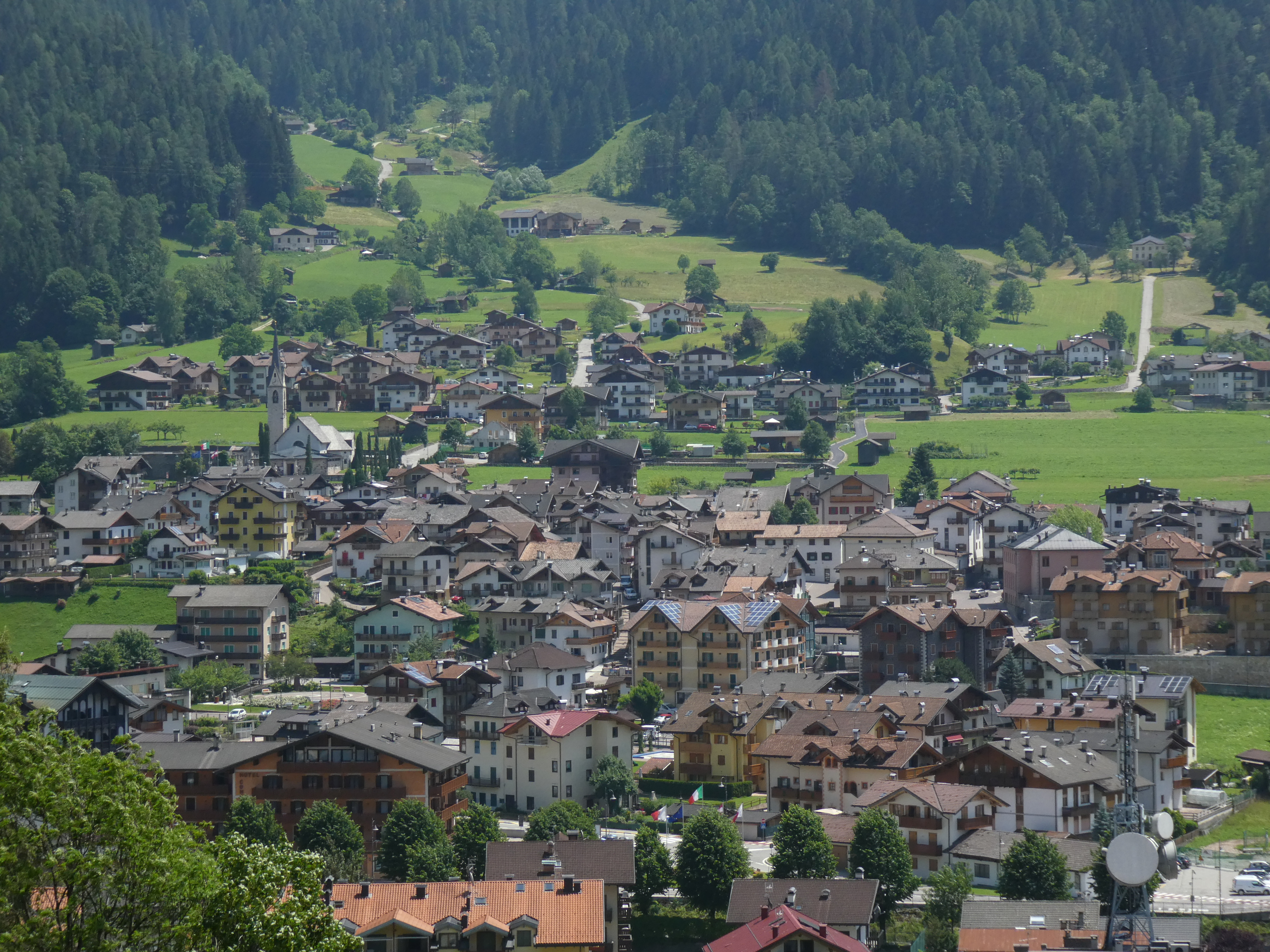

- Location within Italy Location within Trentino-Alto Adige/Südtirol
- Coordinates: 46°11′N 11°50′E
- Country: Italy
- Region: Trentino-Alto Adige/Südtirol
- Province: Trentino (TN)
- Frazioni: Ormanico, Pieve

Area
  - Total: 35.6 km^{2} (13.7 sq mi)
- Elevation: 750 m (2,460 ft)

Population (Dec. 2004)
  - Total: 2,007
  - Density: 56.4/km^{2} (146/sq mi)
- Demonym: Transacqueri
- Time zone: UTC+1 (CET)
  - Summer (DST): UTC+2 (CEST)
- Postal code: 38054
- Dialing code: 0439
- Website: Official website

Transacqua was a comune (municipality) in Trentino in the northern Italian region Trentino-Alto Adige/Südtirol, located about 60 kilometres (37 mi) east of Trento. As of 31 December 2004, it had a population of 2,007 and an area of 35.6 square kilometres (13.7 mi^{2}). It was merged with Siror, Tonadico and Fiera di Primiero on January 1, 2016, to form a new municipality, Primiero San Martino di Castrozza.

The municipality of Transacqua contains the frazioni (subdivisions, mainly villages and hamlets) Ormanico (Hermannich) and Pieve.

Transacqua borders the following municipalities: Siror (Siraur), Sagron Mis (Sagraun), Mezzano (Matzan im Taufers), Cesiomaggiore, Tonadico (Thunadich) and Fiera di Primiero (Markt Primör).

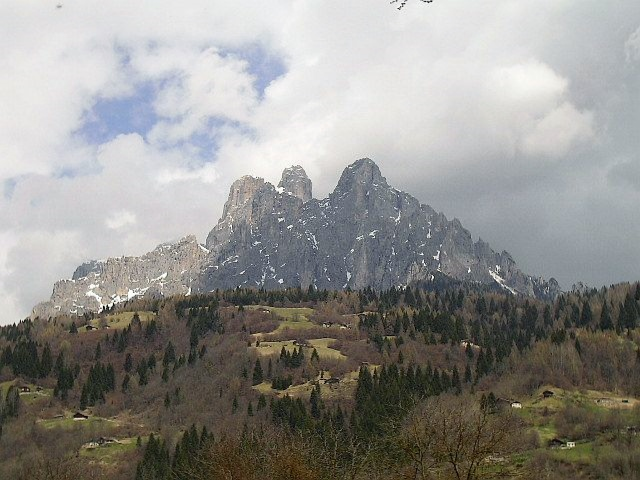
Pale di San Martino seen from the town of Transacqua

== Demographic evolution ==
Historical population

Year	Pop.	±%
1861	?	—
1871	?	—
1881	?	—
1901	?	—
1911	?	—

Year	Pop.	±%
1921	1,644	—
1931	1,500	−8.8%
1936	1,383	−7.8%
1951	1,576	+14.0%
1961	1,639	+4.0%

Year	Pop.	±%
1971	1,645	+0.4%
1981	1,784	+8.4%
1991	1,785	+0.1%
2001	1,940	+8.7%

Source: Data from ISTAT
