= Mezzano =

- Comune
- Comune di Mezzano
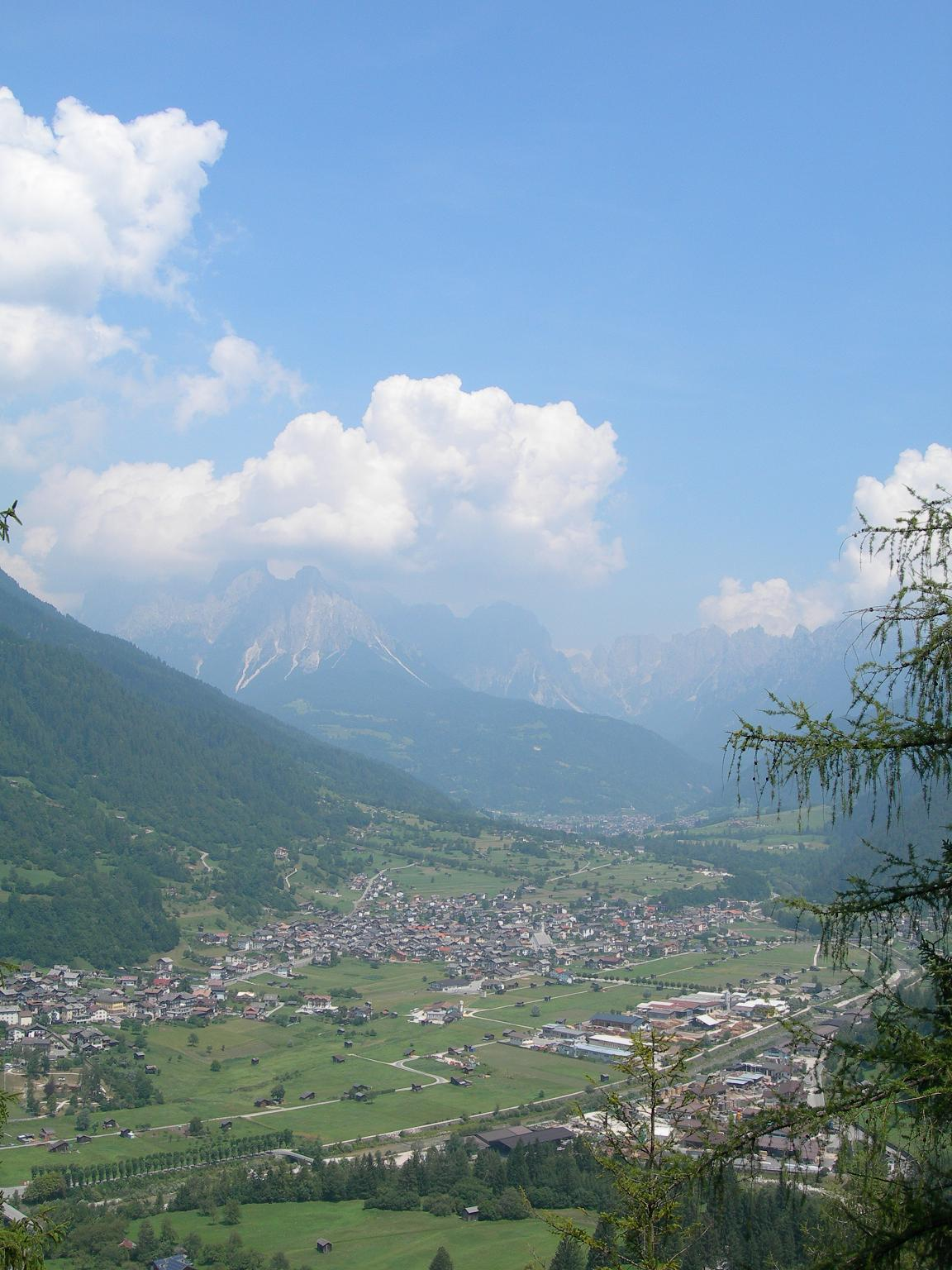
- Mezzano seen from Monte Vederna

- Coat of arms

- Location within Italy Location within Trentino-Alto Adige/Südtirol
- Coordinates: 46°9′N 11°48′E
- Country: Italy
- Region: Trentino-Alto Adige/Südtirol
- Province: Trentino (TN)

Government
  - Mayor: Ivano Orsingher

Area
  - Total: 48.9 km^{2} (18.9 sq mi)
- Elevation: 640 m (2,100 ft)

Population (2026)
  - Total: 1,584
  - Density: 32.4/km^{2} (83.9/sq mi)
- Demonym: Medaneschi
- Time zone: UTC+1 (CET)
  - Summer (DST): UTC+2 (CEST)
- Postal code: 38050
- Dialing code: 0439
- Patron saint: St. George
- Website: Official website

Mezzano (Međàn in local dialect) is a comune (municipality) in Trentino in the northern Italian region Trentino-Alto Adige/Südtirol, located about 50 kilometres (31 mi) east of Trento. As of 31 December 2004, it had a population of 1,644 and an area of 48.9 square kilometres (18.9 mi^{2}).

Mezzano borders the following municipalities: Siror, Canal San Bovo, Cesiomaggiore, Imer, Feltre, Sovramonte and Transacqua. It is one of I Borghi più belli d'Italia ("The most beautiful villages of Italy").

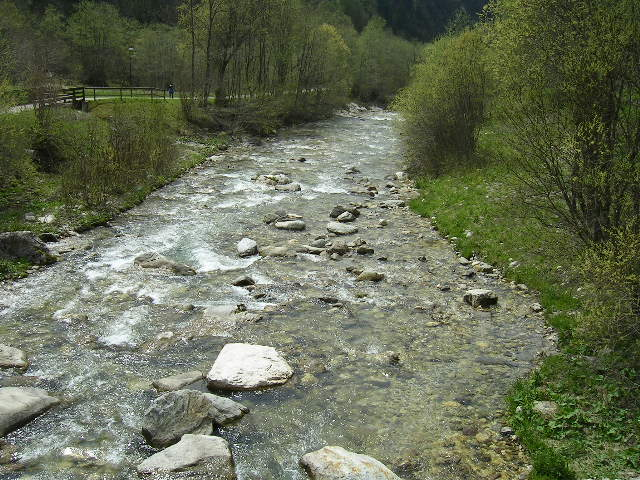
the Cismon Torrent

== Demographic evolution ==
Historical population

Year	Pop.	±%
1861	?	—
1871	?	—
1881	?	—
1901	?	—
1911	?	—

Year	Pop.	±%
1921	1,541	—
1931	1,473	−4.4%
1936	1,454	−1.3%
1951	1,532	+5.4%
1961	1,568	+2.3%

Year	Pop.	±%
1971	1,569	+0.1%
1981	1,621	+3.3%
1991	1,571	−3.1%
2001	1,667	+6.1%

Source: Data from ISTAT
