= Imer, Trentino =

Imèr
- Comune
- Comune di Imer
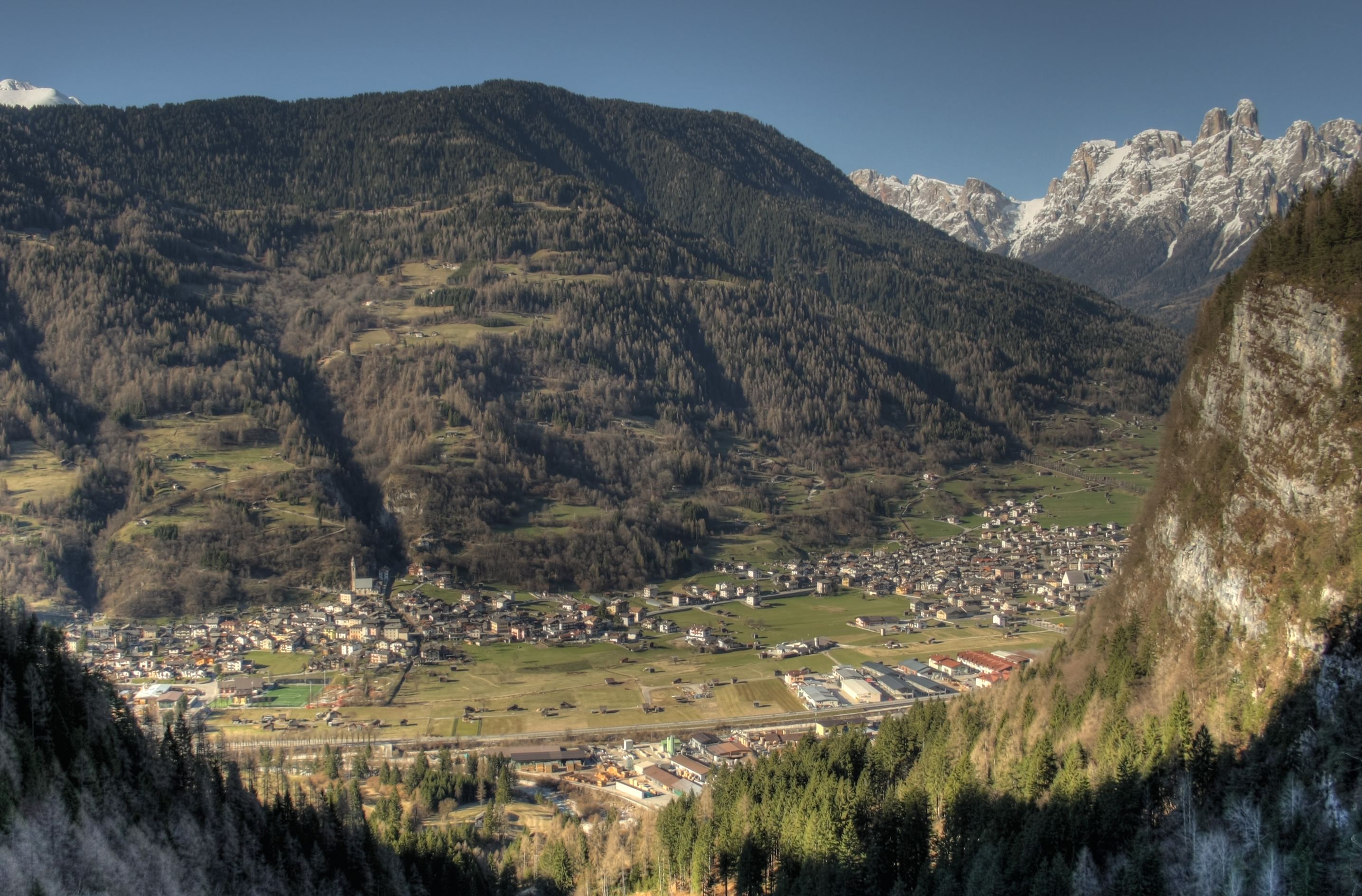
- Imèr in Autumn

- Location within Italy Location within Trentino-Alto Adige/Südtirol
- Coordinates: 46°9′N 11°48′E
- Country: Italy
- Region: Trentino-Alto Adige/Südtirol
- Province: Trentino (TN)
- Frazioni: Masi di Imèr, Pontet

Government
  - Mayor: Daniele Gubert

Area
  - Total: 27.6 km^{2} (10.7 sq mi)
- Elevation: 670 m (2,200 ft)

Population (2026)
  - Total: 1,152
  - Density: 41.7/km^{2} (108/sq mi)
- Demonym: Almeroi or armeroi
- Time zone: UTC+1 (CET)
  - Summer (DST): UTC+2 (CEST)
- Postal code: 38050
- Dialing code: 0439
- Website: Official website

Imer or Imèr is a comune (municipality) in Trentino, located about 50 kilometres (31 mi) east of Trento in northern Italy. As of 31 December 2004, it had a population of 1,213 and an area of 27.6 square kilometres (10.7 mi^{2}).

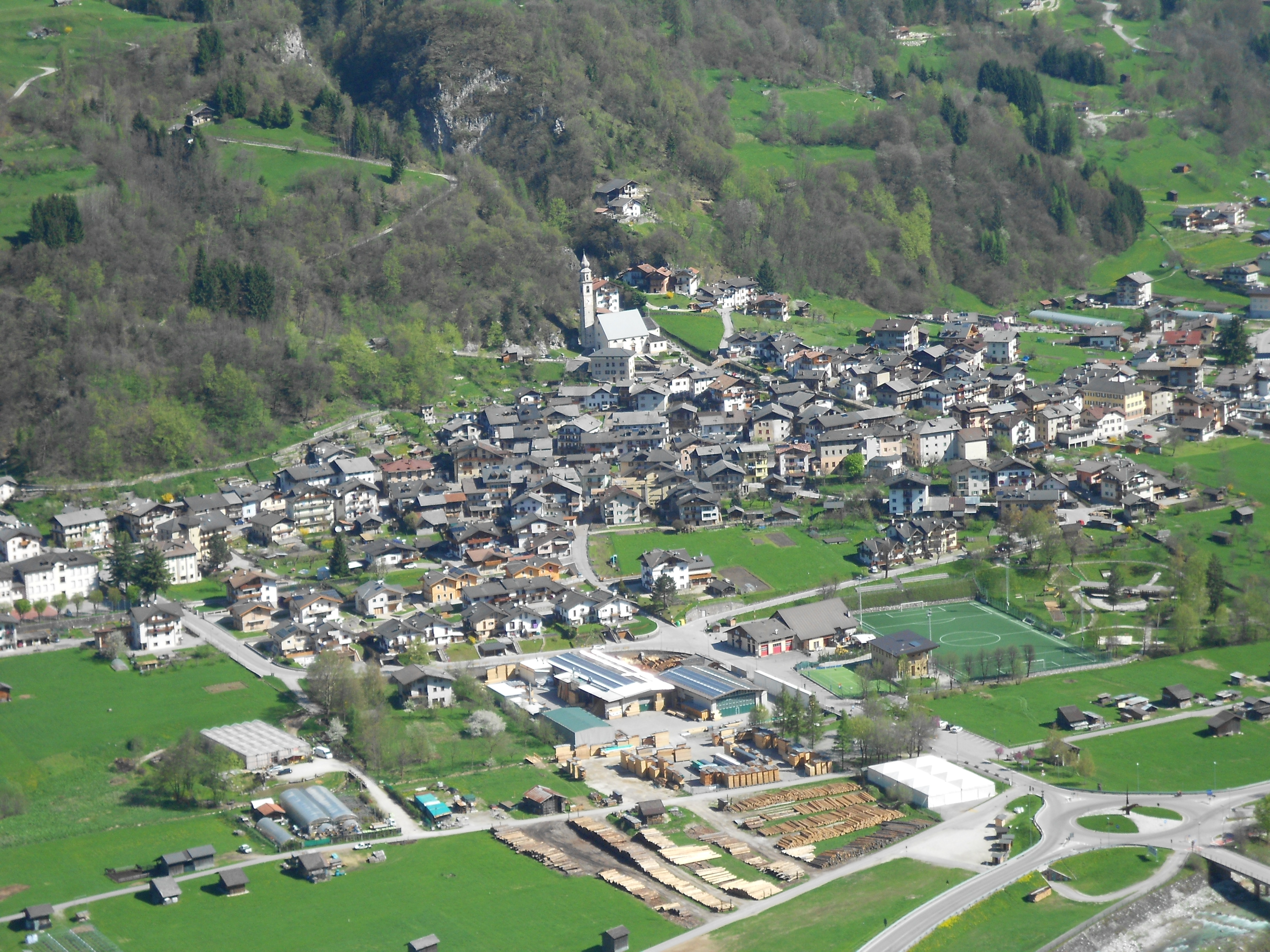
The central part of the village of Imèr

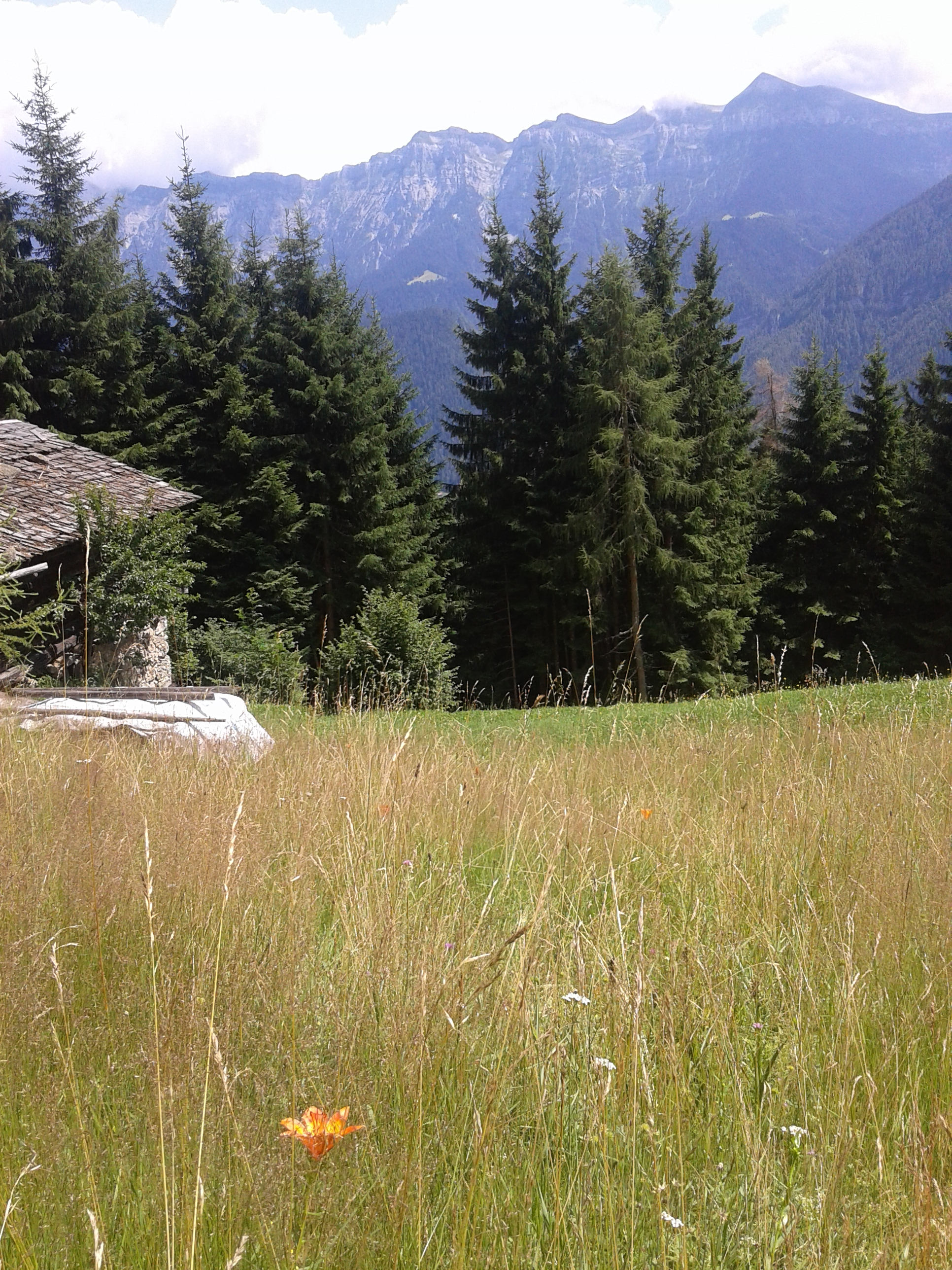
View of the Dolomites from near Imèr

The municipality of Imer contains the frazioni (subdivisions, mainly villages and hamlets) Masi di Imèr, village Sass Maor and Pontet.

Imer borders the following municipalities: Primiero San Martino di Castrozza, Canal San Bovo, Mezzano and Sovramonte.

It includes the Vederne mountain and a part of the Noana valley.

== Demographic evolution ==
Historical population

Year	Pop.	±%
1861	?	—
1871	?	—
1881	?	—
1901	?	—
1911	?	—

Year	Pop.	±%
1921	1,133	—
1931	1,094	−3.4%
1936	1,051	−3.9%
1951	1,181	+12.4%
1961	1,281	+8.5%

Year	Pop.	±%
1971	1,166	−9.0%
1981	1,151	−1.3%
1991	1,131	−1.7%
2001	1,134	+0.3%

Source: Data from ISTAT
