= Tonadico =

- Comune
- Comune di Tonadico
- Location within Italy Location within Trentino-Alto Adige/Südtirol
- Coordinates: 46°11′N 11°50′E
- Country: Italy
- Region: Trentino-Alto Adige/Südtirol
- Province: Trentino (TN)
- Frazioni: Tressane and part of San Martino di Castrozza

Government
  - Mayor: Aurelio Gadenz

Area
  - Total: 89.4 km^{2} (34.5 sq mi)
- Elevation: 765 m (2,510 ft)

Population (Dec. 2004)
  - Total: 1,429
  - Density: 16.0/km^{2} (41.4/sq mi)
- Demonym: Tonadighi
- Time zone: UTC+1 (CET)
  - Summer (DST): UTC+2 (CEST)
- Postal code: 38054
- Dialing code: 0439

Tonadico (Tonadìch in local dialect) was a comune (municipality) in Trentino in the northern Italian region Trentino-Alto Adige/Südtirol, located about 60 kilometres (37 mi) east of Trento. As of 31 December 2004, it had a population of 1,429 and an area of 89.4 square kilometres (34.5 mi^{2}). It was merged with Siror, Fiera di Primiero and Transacqua on January 1, 2016, to form a new municipality, Primiero San Martino di Castrozza.

The municipality of Tonadico contains the frazioni (subdivisions) Tressane and part of San Martino di Castrozza.

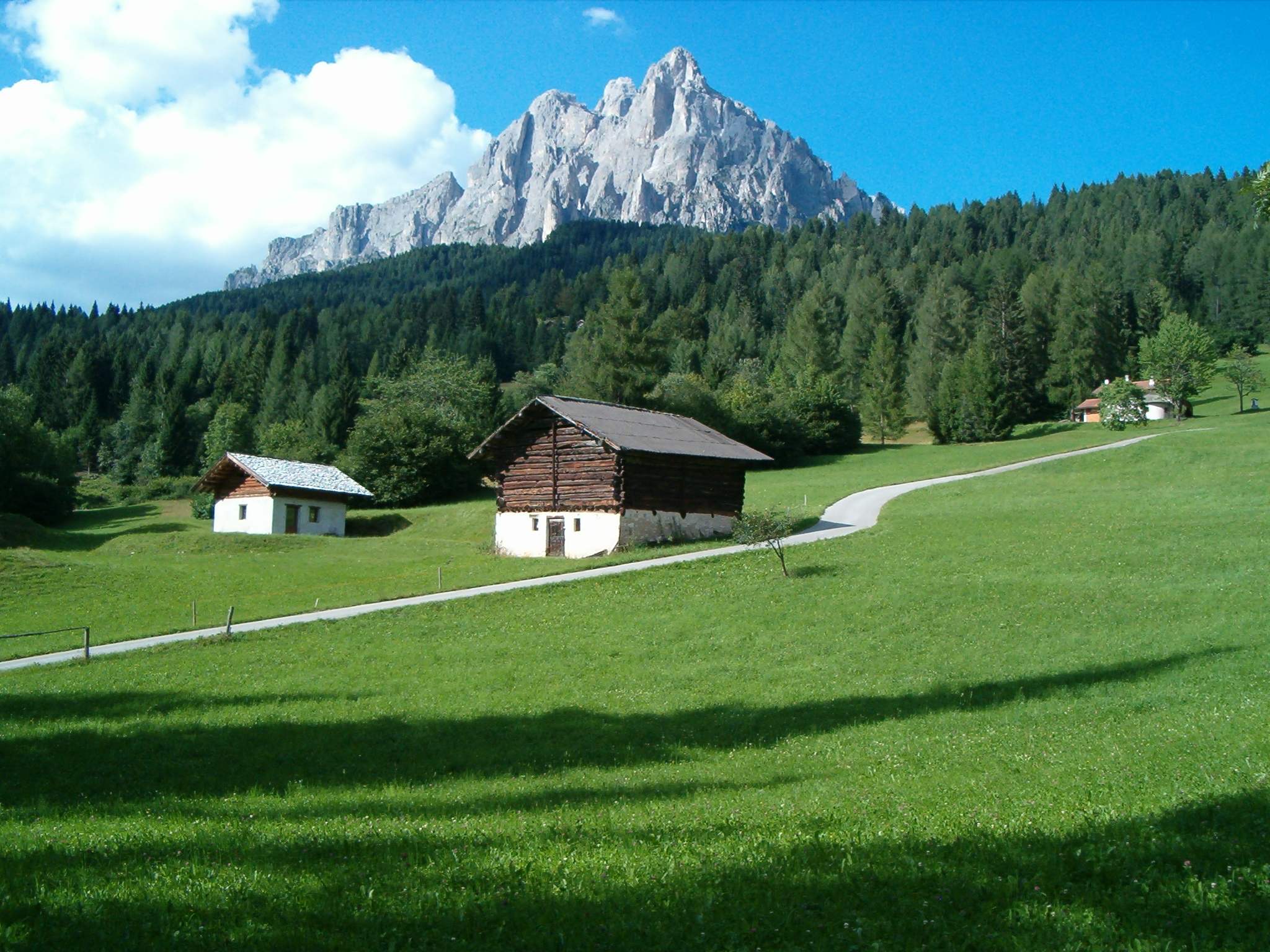
locality strine

Tonadico borders the following municipalities: Falcade, Moena, Canale d'Agordo, Taibon Agordino, Predazzo, Siror, Voltago Agordino, Gosaldo, Sagron Mis, Transacqua and Fiera di Primiero.

== Demographic evolution ==
Historical population

Year	Pop.	±%
1861	?	—
1871	?	—
1881	?	—
1901	?	—
1911	?	—

Year	Pop.	±%
1921	1,094	—
1931	859	−21.5%
1936	892	+3.8%
1951	1,063	+19.2%
1961	1,169	+10.0%

Year	Pop.	±%
1971	1,161	−0.7%
1981	1,234	+6.3%
1991	1,295	+4.9%
2001	1,413	+9.1%

Source: Data from ISTAT
