= Fiera di Primiero =

- Comune
- Comune di Fiera di Primiero
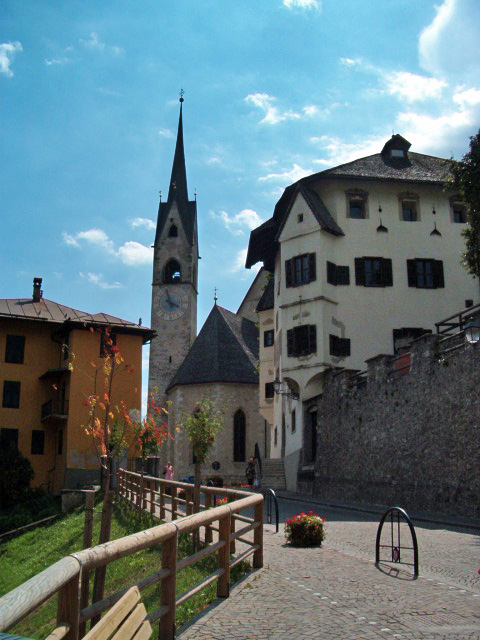
- Rivetta Koch, the Pieve of Santa Maria Assunta and the Palazzo delle Miniere.

- Coat of arms

- Location within Italy Location within Trentino-Alto Adige/Südtirol
- Coordinates: 46°11′N 11°50′E
- Country: Italy
- Region: Trentino-Alto Adige/Südtirol
- Province: Trentino (TN)

Government
  - Mayor: Daniele Depaoli

Area
  - Total: 0.15 km^{2} (0.058 sq mi)
- Elevation: 722 m (2,369 ft)

Population (30 June 2009)
  - Total: 521
  - Density: 3,500/km^{2} (9,000/sq mi)
- Demonym: Fieracoli
- Time zone: UTC+1 (CET)
  - Summer (DST): UTC+2 (CEST)
- Postal code: 38054
- Dialing code: 0439
- Patron saint: Santa Maria Assunta
- Saint day: 15 August
- Website: Official website

Fiera di Primiero (La Fiera in local dialect) was a comune (municipality) in Trentino in the northern Italian region Trentino-Alto Adige/Südtirol, located about 60 kilometres (37 mi) east of Trento. It was merged with Siror, Tonadico and Transacqua on January 1, 2016, to form a new municipality, Primiero San Martino di Castrozza.

With an area of 0.15 square kilometres (0.058 mi^{2}), Fiera di Primiero was one of the smallest municipalities in land area in Italy.

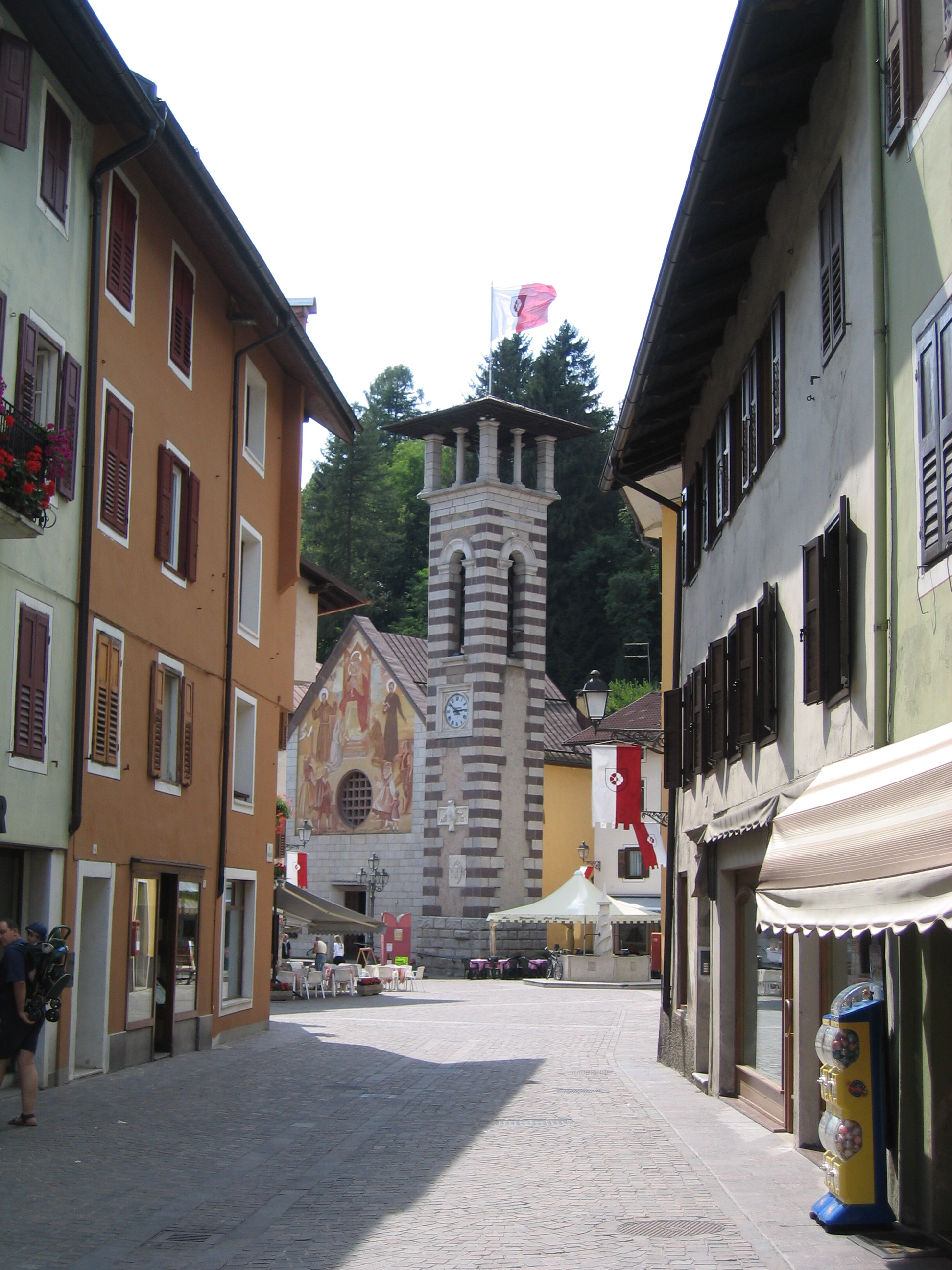
Via Garibaldi, the civic tower and the Church
