= Cesiomaggiore =

- Comune
- Comune di Cesiomaggiore
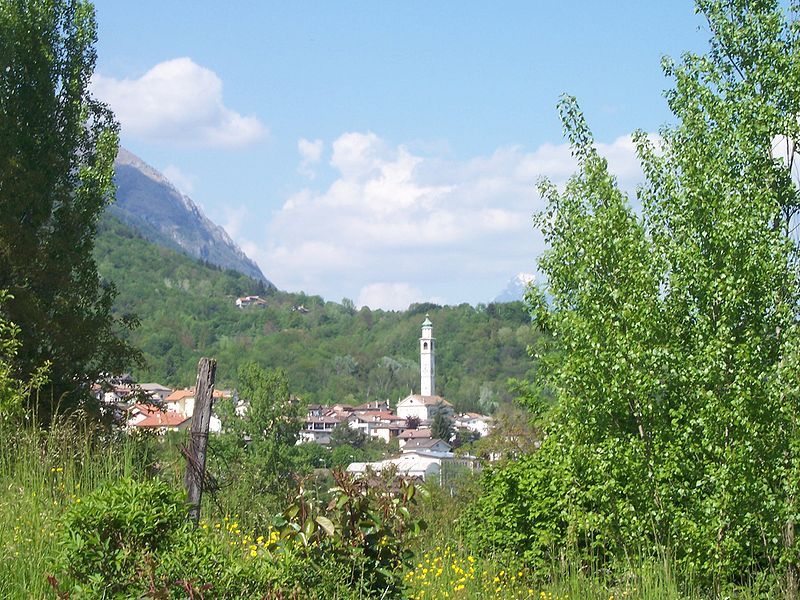
- Cesio Maggiore seen from Cesio Minore.

- Coat of arms

- Location within Italy Location within Veneto
- Coordinates: 46°5′N 11°59′E
- Country: Italy
- Region: Veneto
- Province: Belluno (BL)
- Frazioni: Busche, Can, Calliol, Cesio, Cesio Minore, Cullogne, Fianema, Marsiai, Menin, Morzanch, Pez, Pullir, Soranzen

Government
  - Mayor: Gianni De Bastiani

Area
  - Total: 82.2 km^{2} (31.7 sq mi)
- Elevation: 479 m (1,572 ft)

Population (31 August 2010)
  - Total: 4,210
  - Density: 51.2/km^{2} (133/sq mi)
- Demonym: Cesiolini
- Time zone: UTC+1 (CET)
  - Summer (DST): UTC+2 (CEST)
- Postal code: 32030
- Dialing code: 0439
- Website: Official website

Cesiomaggiore is a comune (municipality) in the Italian region of Veneto, located about 80 kilometres (50 miles) northwest of Venice and about 20 km (12 mi) southwest of Belluno.

The name Cesio derives from the gens Coesia, a noble family from Ravenna that, during the Roman Empire, controlled this territory through a fortified castle, which later passed to the Facino family. The Via Claudia Augusta Altinate passed through Cesiomaggiore, coming from the Venetian lagoon and continuing beyond the Alps.

The Cesia family also owned another castle in the adjacent town Cesiominore, a settlement that was destroyed by the Venetians shortly after Feltre came under the control of the Serenissima Republic of Venice.

Cesio was already the seat of a parish church (pieve) before the year 1000 (documented since 1184), and it changed its name to Cesiomaggiore after being annexed to the Kingdom of Italy in 1867.

The parish of Cesio hosted all the Regole of the territory—assemblies of heads of families who, under the leadership of the marigo, governed community life, managed both common and private property (land, pastures, roads), and oversaw the churches.

During the Venetian rule, which began in 1423, many noble residences were built in the area, thanks in part to the particularly favorable climate of the foothills. Among these is Villa Avogadro degli Azzoni in Serravella, now home to the provincial ethnographic museum.

== International relations ==
=== Twin towns - Sister cities ===
- Aratiba, Brazil
