= Ladin language =

Rhaeto-Romance language of northeast Italy

Ladin
- lingaz ladin, ladin
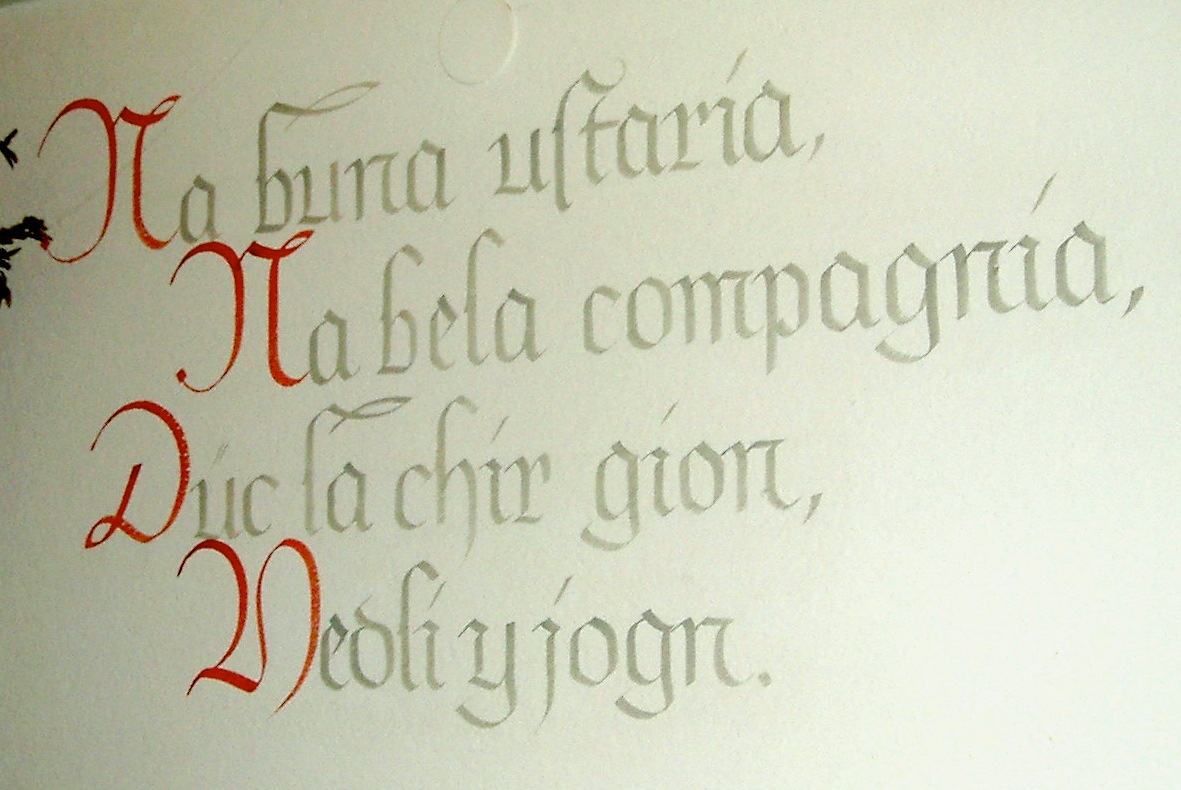
- Native to: Italy
- Region: Ladinia (Trentino-Alto Adige/Südtirol; Veneto)
- Ethnicity: Ladin people
- Native speakers: 41,100 (2006–2011)
- Language family: Indo-European: Italic; Latino-Faliscan; Latinic; Romance; Italo-Western; Western; Gallo-Iberian?; Gallo-Romance; Gallo-Rhaetian?; Rhaeto-Romance; Ladin
- Standard forms: Ladin Dolomitan
- Dialects: Cadorino; Nones; Fornes; etc.
- Writing system: Latin script

Official status
- Regulated by: The office for Ladin language planning Ladin Cultural Centre Majon di Fascegn; Istitut Ladin Micurà de Rü; Istituto Ladin de la Dolomites

Language codes
- ISO 639-3: lld
- Glottolog: ladi1250
- ELP: Ladin
- Linguasphere: 51-AAA-l
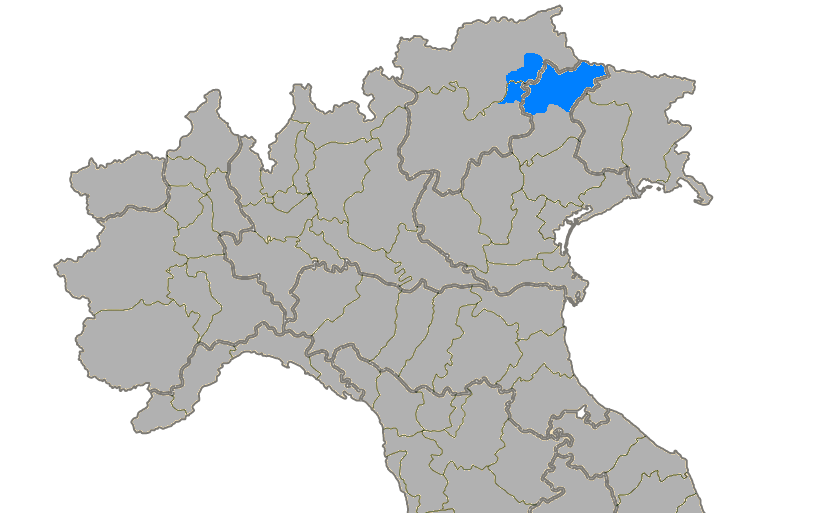
- Distribution of the Ladin language

Languages of South Tyrol. Majorities per municipality in 2011:

Languages of Trentino. Percentage per municipality in 2011:
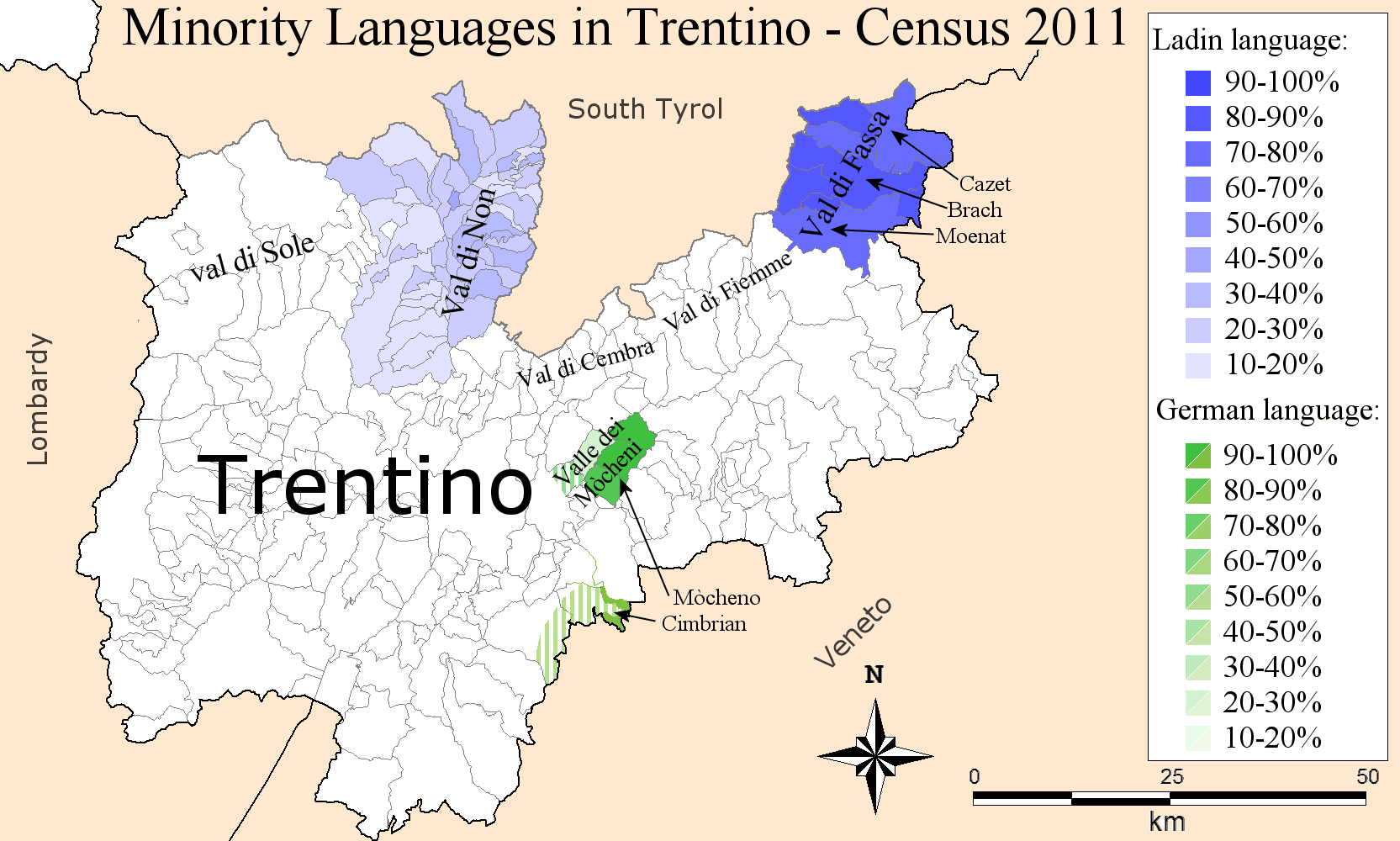

Languages of the Province of Belluno. Recognized Ladin area

Ladin (/ləˈdiːn/ lə-DEEN, UK also /læˈdiːn/ lad-EEN; autonym: ladin; Italian: ladino; German: Ladinisch) is a Romance language of the Rhaeto-Romance subgroup, mainly spoken in the Dolomite Mountains in Northern Italy in the provinces of South Tyrol, Trentino, and Belluno, by the Ladin people. It exhibits similarities to Romansh, which is spoken in Switzerland, as well as to Friulian, which is spoken in northeast Italy.

The precise extent of the Ladin language area is a subject of scholarly debate. A narrower perspective includes only the dialects of the valleys around the Sella group, while wider definitions comprise the dialects of adjacent valleys in the Province of Belluno and even dialects spoken in the northwestern Trentino.

A standard variety of Ladin (Ladin Dolomitan) has been developed by the Office for Ladin Language Planning as a common communication tool across the whole Ladin-speaking region.

== Geographic distribution ==
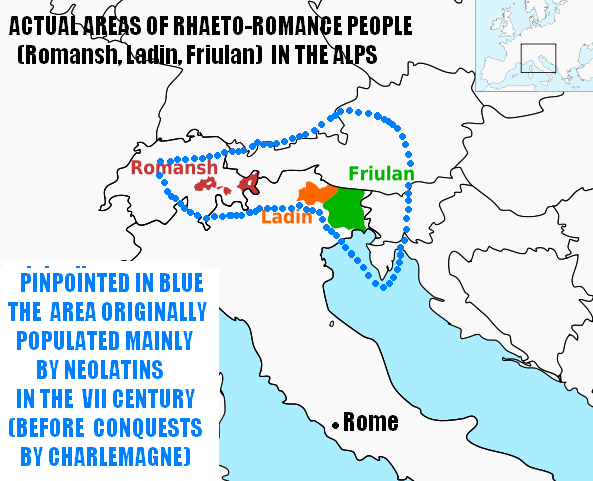
Contraction of the area of the Rhaeto-Romance languages

Ladin is recognized as a minority language in 54 Italian municipalities belonging to the provinces of South Tyrol, Trentino and Belluno. It is not possible to assess the exact number of Ladin speakers, because only in the provinces of South Tyrol and Trentino are the inhabitants asked to identify their native language in the general census of the population, which takes place every 10 years.

=== South Tyrol ===
In the 2011 census, 20,548 inhabitants of South Tyrol declared Ladin as their native language. Ladin is an officially recognised language, taught in schools and used in public offices (in written as well as spoken forms).

The following municipalities of South Tyrol have a majority of Ladin speakers:

Ladin name	Inhabitants	Ladin speakers
Badia	3366	94.07%
Corvara	1320	89.70%
La Val	1299	97.66%
Mareo	2914	92.09%
Urtijëi	4659	84.19%
San Martin de Tor	1733	96.71%
Santa Cristina Gherdëina	1873	91.40%
Sëlva	2664	89.74%
Ciastel	6465	15.37%
Province total	20,548	4.53%

=== Trentino ===
In the 2011 census, 18,550 inhabitants of Trentino declared Ladin as their native language. It is prevailing in the following municipalities of Trentino in the Fassa Valley, where Ladin is recognized as a minority language:

Italian name	Ladin name	Inhabitants	Ladin speakers	Percentage
Campitello di Fassa	Ciampedel	740	608	82.2%
Canazei	Cianacei	1,911	1,524	79.7%
Mazzin	Mazin	493	381	77.3%
Moena	Moena	2,698	2,126	78.8%
Pozza di Fassa	Poza	2,138	1,765	82.6%
Soraga	Sorega	736	629	85.5%
Vigo di Fassa	Vich	1,207	1,059	87.7%
Province total		9,993	8,092	80.9%

The Nones language in the Non Valley and the related Solandro language found in the Sole Valley are Gallo-Romance languages and often grouped together into a single linguistic unit due to their similarity. They are spoken in 38 municipalities but have no official status. Their more precise classification is uncertain. Both dialects show a strong resemblance to Trentinian dialect and Eastern Lombard, and scholars debate whether they are Ladin dialects or not.

About 23% of the inhabitants from Val di Non and 1.5% from Val di Sole declared Ladin as their native language at the 2011 census. The number of Ladin speakers in those valleys amounts to 8,730, outnumbering the native speakers in the Fassa Valley. In order to stress the difference between the dialects in Non and Fassa valleys, it has been proposed to distinguish between ladins dolomitiches (Dolomitic Ladinians) and ladins nonejes (Non Valley Ladinians) at the next census.

=== Province of Belluno ===
There is no linguistic census in the Province of Belluno, but the number of Ladin speakers has been estimated using a 2006 survey. In this area, there are about 1,166 people who speak the standard Ladin and 865 who speak the dialect of Ladin, so out of 8,495 inhabitants they are the 23.9%. They live in the part of the province that was part of the County of Tyrol until 1918, comprising the communes of Cortina d'Ampezzo (15.6% Ladin), Colle Santa Lucia (50.6% Ladin) and Livinallongo del Col di Lana (54.3% Ladin).

Italian name	Ladin name	Inhabitants	Ladin speakers	Percentage
Cortina d'Ampezzo	Anpezo	6,630	1,034	15.6%
Colle Santa Lucia	Col	434	220	50.6%
Livinallongo del Col di Lana	Fodóm	1,431	777	54.3%
Total		8,495	2,031	23.9%

The provincial administration of Belluno has enacted to identify Ladin as a minority language in additional municipalities. Those are: Agordo, Alleghe, Auronzo di Cadore, Borca di Cadore, Calalzo di Cadore, Canale d'Agordo, Cencenighe Agordino, Cibiana di Cadore, Comelico Superiore, Danta di Cadore, Domegge di Cadore, Falcade, Forno di Zoldo, Gosaldo, La Valle Agordina, Lozzo di Cadore, Ospitale di Cadore, Perarolo di Cadore, Pieve di Cadore, Rivamonte Agordino, Rocca Pietore, San Nicolò di Comelico, San Pietro di Cadore, San Tomaso Agordino, San Vito di Cadore, Santo Stefano di Cadore, Selva di Cadore, Taibon Agordino, Vallada Agordina, Valle di Cadore, Vigo di Cadore, Vodo di Cadore, Voltago Agordino, Zoldo Alto, Zoppè di Cadore. Ladinity in the province of Belluno is more ethnic than linguistic. The varieties spoken by Ladin municipalities are Venetian alpine dialects, which are grammatically no different to those spoken in municipalities that did not declare themselves as Ladin. Their language is called Ladino Bellunese.

All Ladin dialects spoken in the province of Belluno, including those in the former Tyrolean territories, enjoy a varying degree of influence from Venetian.

== History ==
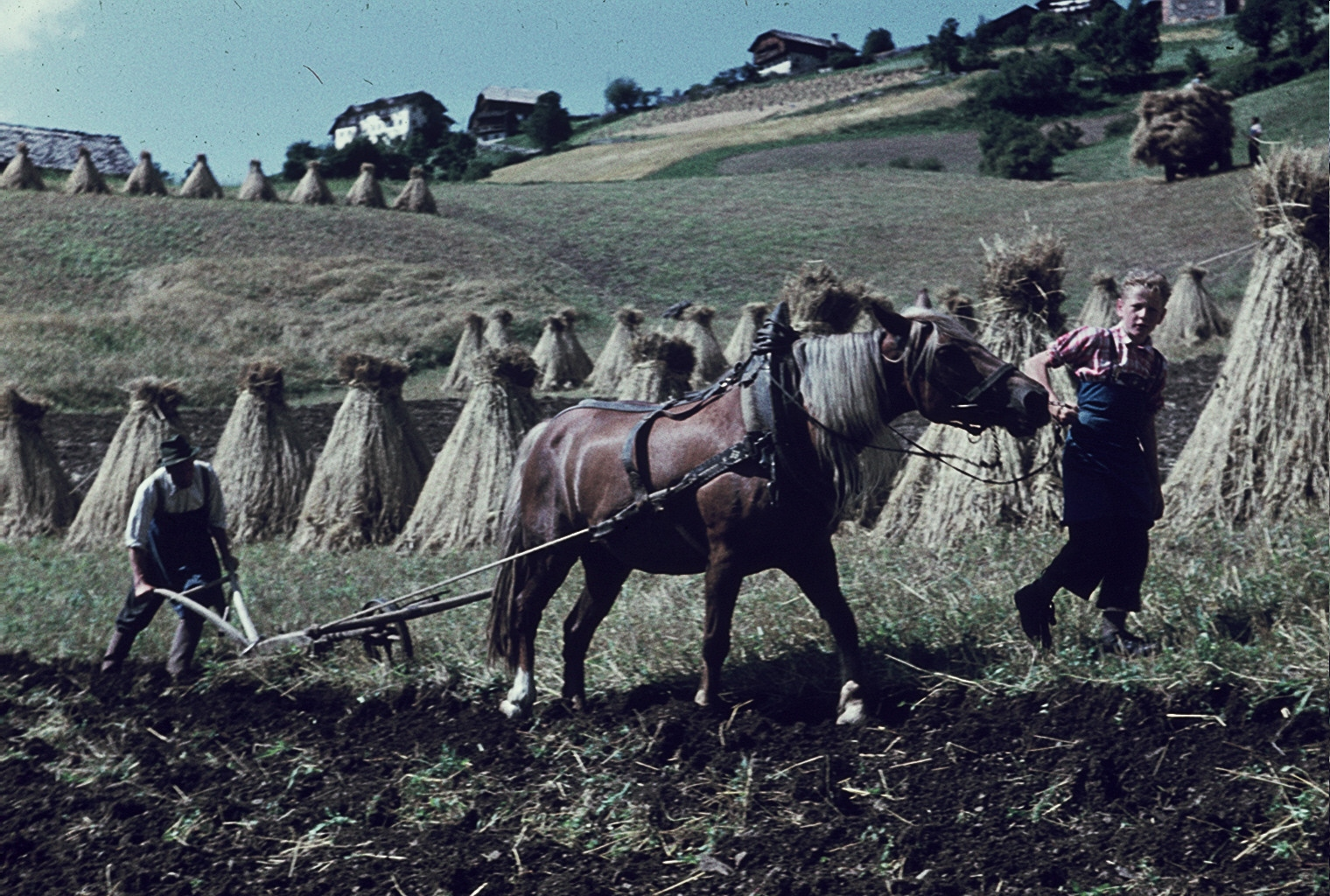
Ladin farmers in 1960s La Val, South Tyrol

The name derives from Latin, because Ladin is originally a Vulgar Latin language left over from the Romanized Alps. Ladin is often attributed to be a relic of Vulgar Latin dialects associated with Rhaeto-Romance languages. Whether a proto-Rhaeto-Romance language ever existed is controversially discussed amongst linguists and historians, a debate known as Questione Ladina. Starting in the 6th century, the Bavarii started moving in from the north, while from the south Gallo-Italic languages started pushing in, which further shrank the original extent of the Ladin area. Only in the more remote mountain valleys did Ladin survive among the isolated populations.

Starting in the very early Middle Ages, the area was mostly ruled by the County of Tyrol or the Bishopric of Brixen, both belonging to the realms of the Austrian Habsburg rulers. The area of Cadore was under the rule of the Republic of Venice. During the period of the Holy Roman Empire and, after 1804, the Austrian Empire, the Ladins underwent a process of Germanization.

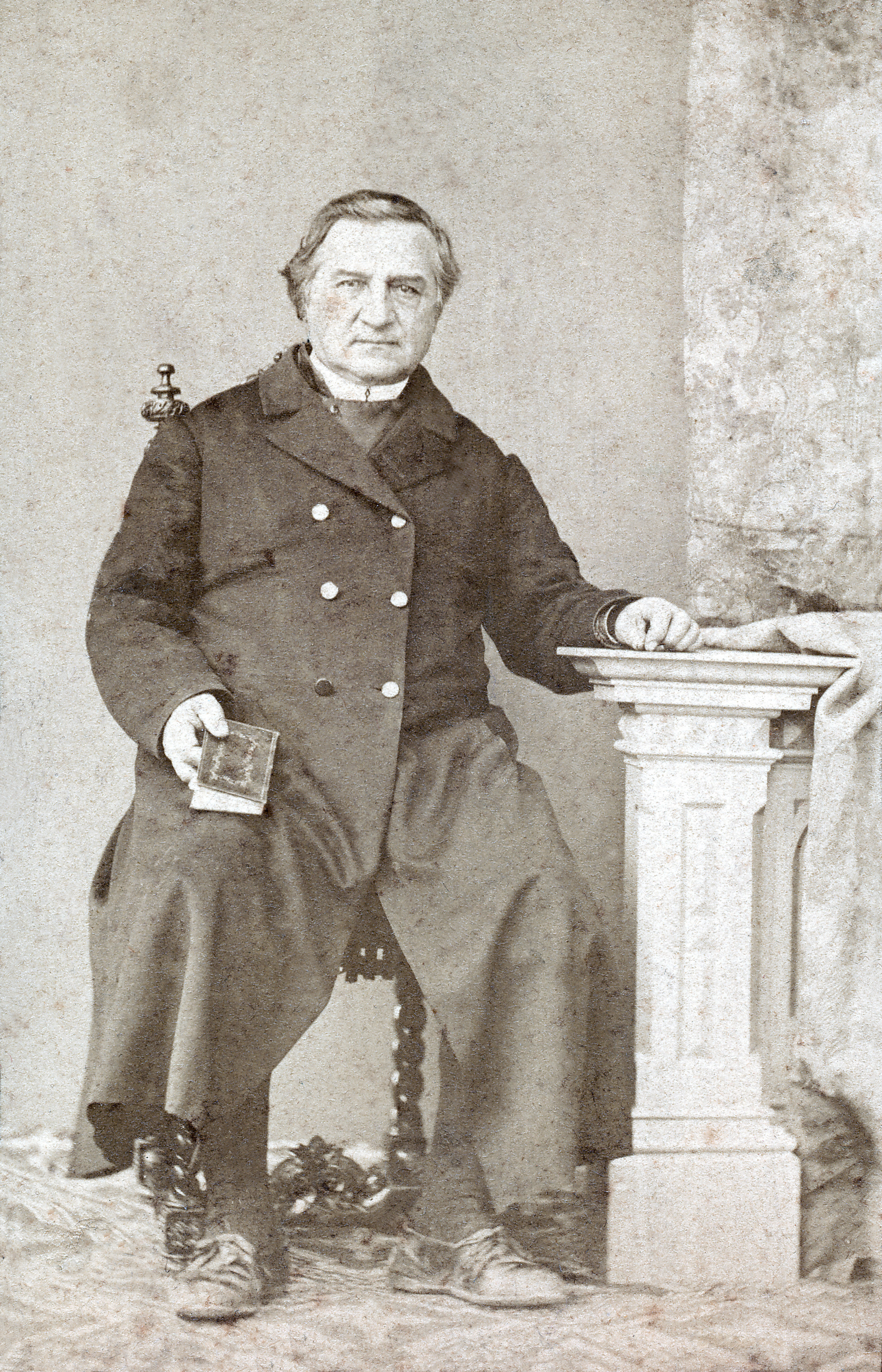
Kurat Josef Anton Vian – anonymous author of the first Ladin-Gherdëina grammar AD 1864

After the end of World War I in 1918, Italy annexed the southern part of Tyrol, including the Ladin areas. The Italian nationalist movement of the 19th and 20th centuries regarded Ladin as an "Italian dialect", a notion rejected by various Ladin exponents and associations, despite their having been counted as Italians by the Austrian authorities as well. The programme of Italianization, professed by fascists such as Ettore Tolomei and Benito Mussolini, added further pressure on the Ladin communities to subordinate their identities to Italian. This included changing Ladin place names into the Italian pronunciation according to Tolomei's Prontuario dei nomi locali dell'Alto Adige.

Following the end of World War II, the Gruber-De Gasperi Agreement of 1946 between Austria and Italy introduced a level of autonomy for Trentino and South Tyrol but did not include any provisions for the Ladin language. Only in the second autonomy statute for South Tyrol in 1972 was Ladin recognized as a partially official language.

== Status ==
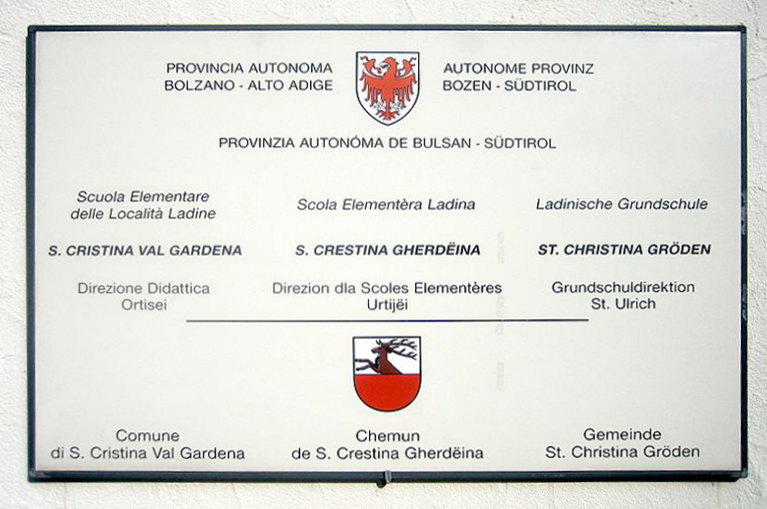
Plaque of a Ladin school in Santa Cristina

Ladin is officially recognised in Trentino and South Tyrol by provincial and national law. Italy signed the European Charter for Regional or Minority Languages of 1991, but it has not ratified it so far. The charter calls for minority rights to be respected and minority languages, to which Ladin belongs, to be appropriately protected and promoted. Starting in the 1990s, the Italian parliament and provincial assembly have passed laws and regulations protecting the Ladin language and culture. A cultural institute was founded to safeguard and educate in the language and culture. School curricula were adapted in order to teach in Ladin, and street signs are being changed to bilingual.

Ladin is also recognized as a protected language in the Province of Belluno in Veneto region pursuant to the Standards for Protection of Historic Language Minorities Act No. 482 (1999). In comparison with South Tyrol and Trentino, the wishes of the Ladins have barely been addressed by the regional government. In a popular referendum in October 2007, the inhabitants of Cortina d'Ampezzo overwhelmingly voted to leave Veneto and return to South Tyrol. The redrawing of the provincial borders would return Cortina d'Ampezzo, Livinallongo del Col di Lana and Colle Santa Lucia to South Tyrol, to which they traditionally belonged when part of the County of Tyrol or the Bishopric of Brixen.

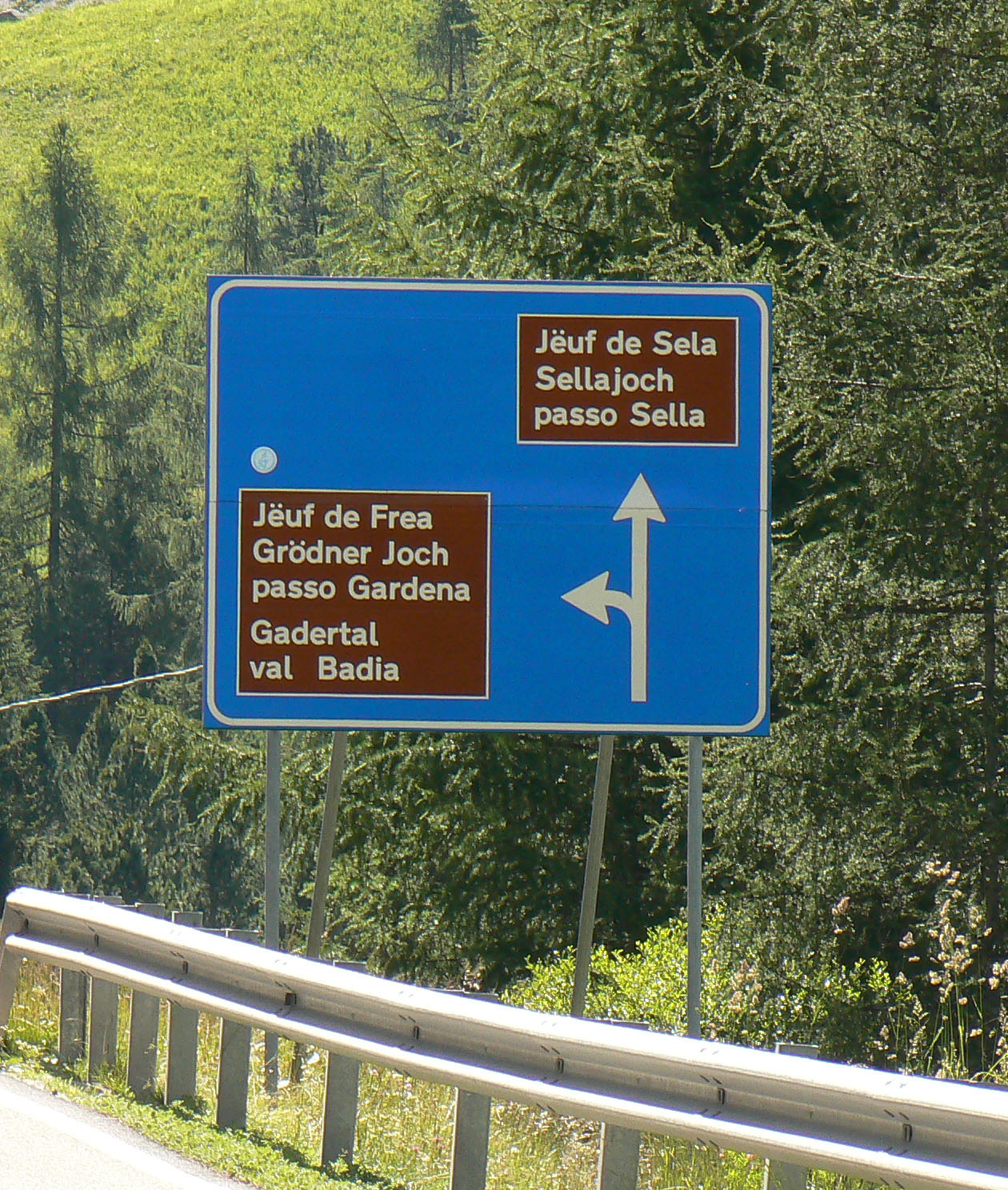
Trilingual traffic sign

Although the Ladin communities are spread out over three neighbouring regions, the Union Generala di Ladins dles Dolomites is asking that they be reunited. The Ladin Autonomist Union and the Fassa Association run on a Ladin list and have sought more rights and autonomy for Ladin speakers. Ladins are also guaranteed political representations in the assemblies of Trentino and South Tyrol due to a reserved seats system.

In South Tyrol, in order to reach a fair allocation of jobs in public service, a system called "ethnic proportion" was established in the 1970s. Every 10 years, when the general census of population takes place, each citizen has to identify with a linguistic group. The results determine how many potential positions in public service are allocated for each linguistic group. This has theoretically enabled Ladins to receive guaranteed representation in the South Tyrolean civil service according to their numbers.

The recognition of minority languages in Italy has been criticised since the implementation of Act No. 482 (1999), especially due to alleged financial benefits. This applies also to the Ladin language, especially in the province of Belluno.

== Subdivisions ==
A possible subdivision of Ladin language identifies six major groups.

=== Athesian Group of the Sella ===
The dialects of the Athesian group (from the river Adige Basin) of the Sella are spoken in South Tyrol:

- Gherdëina, spoken in Val Gardena by 8,148 inhabitants (80–90% of the population);
- Badiot and Maró, spoken in Val Badia and in Mareo by 9,229 people (95%), as native language.

The South Tyrolean dialects are most similar to the original Ladin.

Sample of Ladin language from Gherdëina
Adele Moroder-Lenert talks about her grandparents. (From the Archive Radio Ladin – Alex Moroder)

Sample of Ladin language from Gherdëina
Tresl Gruber talks about her youth. (Aired on Radio Ladin in 1961)

=== Trentinian Group of the Sella ===
The names of the Ladin dialects spoken in the Fassa Valley in Trentino are Moenat, Brach, and Cazet. 82.8% of the inhabitants of Fassa Valley are native Ladin speakers; the Ladin language in Fassa is influenced by Trentinian dialects.

=== Agordino Group of the Sella ===
In the Province of Belluno the following dialects are considered as part of the Agordino group:

- Fodom, also called Livinallese, spoken in Livinallongo del Col di Lana and Colle Santa Lucia, native language of 80–90% of the people;
- Rocchesano in the area of Rocca Pietore. While Laste di Sopra (Ladin Laste de Sora) and Sottoguda (Ladin Stagùda) are predominantly Ladin, in Alleghe, San Tomaso Agordino, and Falcade so-called Ladin-Venetian dialects are spoken, with strong Venetian influence;
- Ladin in the area of Agordo and Valle del Biois, even if some regard it rather as Venetian-Ladin.

=== Ampezzan Group ===
Spoken in Cortina d'Ampezzo (Anpezo), similar to Cadorino dialect.

Even in Valle di Zoldo (from Forno-Fôr upwards) there are elements of the Ampezzan Group.

=== Cadorino Group ===
Spoken in Cadore and Comelico and best known as Cadorino dialect.

=== Nones and Solandro Group ===
In Western Trentino, in Non Valley, Val di Sole, Val di Peio, Val di Rabbi, and part of Val Rendena, detached from the Dolomitic area, dialects are spoken that are often considered to be part of the Ladin language (Anaunic Ladin), but have strong influences from Trentinian and Eastern Lombard dialects.

== Sample texts ==
=== Lord's Prayer ===
The first part of the 'Lord's Prayer' in Standard Ladin, Latin, and its fellow Rhaeto-Romance languages for comparison, as well as English:

Ladin	Latin	Romansh	Friulian	English
Pere nost, che t'ies en ciel, al sie santifiché ti inom, al vegne ti regn, sia fata tia volonté, coche en ciel enscì en tera.	Pater noster, qui es in caelis: sanctificetur nomen tuum; adveniat regnum tuum; fiat voluntas tua, sicut in caelo, et in terra.	Bab noss, che es en il tschêl, sainztifitgà vegia tes Num, tes reginavel vegia tar nus, tes cumond vegia fatg sco en il tschêl uschia er sin la terra.	Pari nestri che tu sês in cîl, che al sedi santifiât il to nom, che al vegni il to ream, che e sedi fate la tô volontâtsicu in cîl cussì ancje in tiere.	Our Father, who art in heaven, hallowed be thy name. Thy kingdom come, Thy will be done, on earth as it is in heaven.

=== Common phrases ===
English	Italian	Gherdëina	Val Badia	Fassa Valley	Anpezo (Cadorino)	Zoldo	Alleghe	Nones	Solandro	Låger
What's your name?	Come ti chiami?	Co es'a inuem?	Co aste pa inom?	Co èste pa inom?	Ce asto gnon?	Ke asto gnóm?	kome te ciameto?	Come te clames po? (Che gias nom po?)	Che jas nòm po?	Come te cjames tive po?
How old are you?	Quanti anni hai?	Tan d'ani es'a?	Tan de agn aste pa?	Cotenc egn èste pa?	Cuante ane asto?	Quainch agn asto?	Kotanc agn asto?	Canti ani gias po?	Cuanti àni gh'às/jas po?	Qanti an' gås tive po?
I am going home.	Vado a casa.	Vede a cësa.	Vá a ciasa.	Vae a cèsa.	Vado a ciasa.	Vade a casa.	Vade a ciesa.	Von a ciasa.	Von a chjasô / casa.	Vonn a maſon / cà
Where do you live?	Dove abiti?	Ulà stes'a?	Olá abitëieste pa?	Olà stèste pa?	Agnó stasto?	An do stasto?	Ulà stasto?	En do abites?	Ndo abites po?	Ndo abites tive po?
I live in Trent.	Vivo a Trento.	Stei a Trënt.	Stá a Trënt.	Stae ja Trent.	Stago a Trento.	Staghe a Trento.	Stae a Trient.	Ston a Trent	Ston a Trent	Stonn a Treant

== Phonology ==
=== Consonants ===
Consonant phonemes
		Labial	Dental/ Alveolar	Palatal	Velar	Glottal
Nasal		m	n	ɲ	ŋ	
Plosive	voiceless	p	t		k	
Plosive	voiced	b	d		ɡ	
Affricate	voiceless		ts	tʃ		
Affricate	voiced		dz	dʒ		
Fricative	voiceless	f	s	ʃ		h
Fricative	voiced	v	z	ʒ		
Trill			r			
Approximant		w	l	j		

Walker and Yang state that Ladin does not include a palatal series other than the palatal nasal. Additionally, Walker and Yang also add that Ladin does not use a glottal fricative. [r] is variably described as a trill or a liquid.

Throughout the course of the history of the language, coronal obstruents have changed into sibilant fricatives and affricates. The transition is shown below.

/c, ɟ/ → /tʂ, dʐ/, /ts, dz/ → /s, z/, /s, z/ → /ʂ, ʐ/

In the Fascian variety, Ladin language speakers often incorporate and use a second voiceless dental/alveolar affricate /ts/ as the pronunciation for "z". This is thought to be due to influence of Standard Fascian Ladin and Italian on other varieties of Ladin.

=== Vowels ===
Vowel phonemes
	Front		Central	Back
Close	i	y		u
Close mid	e	ø		o
Open mid	ɛ		ɐ	ɔ
Open			a	

An [ɐ] vowel, spelled ⟨ë⟩, as in Urtijëi, and two front rounded vowels [ø, y], spelled ⟨ö, ü⟩, occur in some local dialects (such as Val Badia) but are not a part of Standard Ladin.

The Moenat variety uses eight monophthongs in comparison to the seven monophthongs used in other varieties of Fascian Ladin. The additional vowel sound /ø/ is not commonly used but still present enough to be an additional to their vowel phonemes. The mid vowel pairs /e, ɛ/ and /o, ɔ/ become indistinguishable when found in unstressed syllables.

=== Syllable Structure ===
The following formula describes the possibilities of syllable structures in Ladin.

- C_{1}(C_{2}) (C_{3}) V (C_{4})(C_{5})(C_{6})

C_{2} can be a plosive, trill/liquid, or an approximant. C_{3} can be a trill/liquid or an approximant. C_{4} can be trill/liquid, an approximant, a nasal, or a sibilant fricative. C_{5} can be plosive, affricate, fricative, or a nasal. C_{6} can be an affricate. Syllable complexity is sensitive to word domains (position in the word).

==== Word Initial Position ====
The following are constant cluster types that are possible in Ladin language syllable structure and additional rules that apply to clusters in word initial position.

- obstruent stop or fricative followed by a liquid (excluding coronal stops followed by a lateral liquid or [v] followed by a lateral liquid
- a sibilant fricative occurs in word initial when placed before any non-sibilant obstruent followed by [r] or [l]
- /l/ does not appear in clusters with coronal stops
- /v/ does not appear before another consonant
- affricates do not appear in word initial clusters
- In the Moenat variety, post-alveolar sibilant fricatives assimilate their voicing to the stops following them when in word initial position (additional citing)

Examples of these rules and types are displayed in the following word examples:

1. (non-sibilant obstruent+liquid) : [pr-] = [preˈar] - 'to pray'
2. (sibilant fricative + non-sibilant obstruent) : [ʂp-] = [ʂparpaˈɲa] - 'widespread'
3. (sibilant fricative + nasal) : [ˈʐɲ-] = [ˈʐɲapa] - 'acquavite, grape-based brandy'
4. (sibilant fricative + liquid) : [ʐr-] = [ʐraˈmar] - 'to cut off the branches from a tree'
5. (sibilant fricative + non-sibilant obstruent + liquid) : [ʐdr-] = [ʐdraˈmatʂ] - 'mattress'

==== Word Medial Position ====
The following are consonant cluster types that appear in the Ladin language syllable structure and well as additional restrictions present for word medial cluster types.

- only allowed a maximum of three consonants
- a sibilant fricative when preceded by a nasal
- affricates do not appear before a liquid (also seen in word initial cluster positions)

Examples of these rules and types are displayed in the following word examples:

1. (nasal + sibilant fricative) : [-ns-] = [linˈsøl] - 'bed sheet'
2. (sibilant fricative + plosive) : [-ʂp-] = [deʂˈpɛt] - 'prank'
3. (liquid + affricate) : [-ldʐ-] = [ˈøldʐe] - 'eye'
4. (non-sibilant fricative + liquid) : [-fr-] = [oˈfrir] - 'to offer'

==== Word Final Position ====
Lastly, the following are known options for constant clustering in word final position and the restrictions that may apply to those cluster types.

- cannot exceed two consonants
- sonorant consonants can appear before obstruents
- a sibilant fricative can appear before either a plosive or affricate
- obstruents in word final become voiceless

Final devoicing is common in the Moenat variety of the Ladin language. Obstruents in final position do not display in typical form. Their voicing is neutralized and often following voicing agreement in other positions as well.

Examples of these rules and types are displayed in the following word examples:

1. (nasal + non-sibilant fricative) : [-mf] = [sɛmf] - 'mustard'
2. (sibilant fricative + plosive) : [-ʂp] = [ruʂp] - 'hoard'
3. (liquid + sibilant fricative) : [-ls] = [ʐbals] - 'jump'
4. (liquid + plosive) : [-rk] = [lark] - 'large'

== Writing system ==
IPA		Orthography	Examples
/k/	+ a \ o \ u \ y \ ø	c	cun (with)
/k/	+ i \ e \ ɐ \ ∅	ch	chësc (this)
/tʃ/	+ a \ o \ u \ y \ ø	ci	ciüf (flower)
/tʃ/	+ i \ e \ ɐ \ ∅	c	düc (all)
/tʃ/	(after ʃ)	ć (Gardena)	sćimà (lush)
/ɡ/	+ a \ o \ u \ y \ ø	g	magari (maybe)
/ɡ/	+ i \ e \ ɐ \ ∅	gh	ghest (host)
/dʒ/	+ a \ o \ u \ y \ ø	gi	lungia (long)
/dʒ/	+ i \ e \ ɐ \ ∅	g	mangé (to eat)
/s/	(before a vowel)	s	so (sister)
/s/	(ending of word)	s	nes (nose)
/s/	(between vowels)	ss	messëi (must, to have to)
/z/	(before a vowel)	ś (Gardena)	śën (now)
/z/	(before a vowel)	s (Val Badia)	soghé (to play)
/z/	(between vowels)	s	ciasa (house)
/ʃk/	+ a \ o \ u \ y \ ø	sc	scür (darkness)
/ʃk/	+ i \ e \ ɐ \ ∅	sch	scheda (scheda)
/ʃ/	+ a \ o \ u \ y \ ø	sci	versciun (version)
/ʃ/	+ i \ e \ ɐ \ ∅	sc	osc (your [pl.])
/ʃ/	(final j)	j (Gardena)	liej ([he/she] reads)
/ʃ/	(before unvoiced consonant)	s	ester (to be)
/ʒ/	(before voiced consonant)	s	svaié (scream)
/ʒ/	(elsewhere)	j	jí (to walk)
/ts/		z	demez (away)
/b/		b	bel (beautiful)
/d/		d	dilan (thanks)
/f/		f	flama (flame)
/h/		h	hoi (hello)
/l/		l	tlerëza (brightness)
/m/		m	möta (girl)
/n/	–	n	nöt (night)
/n/	(at the end of the syllable)	nn	monn (world)
/ŋ/	(at the end of the syllable)	n	en (in)
/ɲ/		gn	sëgn (now)
/p/		p	püch (a bit)
/r/		r	aragn (spider)
/t/		t	tomé (to fall)
/v/		v	asvelt (fast)
/ə/	(unstressed letter e)	e	benedisciun (blessing)
/ˈi/		i	cil (sky)
/ˈe/	(final)	é	porté (to bring)
/ˈe/	(elsewhere)	e	pe (foot)
/ˈɛ/		e	pe (pole)
/ˈa/		a	pa [interrogative particle]
/ˈu/		u	uma (mother)
/ˈo/	(final)	ó	chiló (here)
/ˈo/	(elsewhere)	o	toch (fat)
/ˈɔ/		o	toch (touch)
/ˈɐ/		ë	ëra (she)
(Val Badia)	/ˈø/	ö	tö (you [sg.])
(Val Badia)	/ˈy/	ü	plü (more)

Grave is used to mark stress at the last syllable and circumflex is used to mark long vowels.

== Encoding ==
The IETF language tags register subtags for the different standards:

- anpezo. In Anpezo.
- fascia. It unifies the varieties of Cazet, Brach and Moenat
- fodom. Used in Livinallongo and Colle Santa Lucia
- gherd. In Gherdëina.
- valbadia. In Val Badia, unifying Marô, Mesaval and Badiot

== See also ==
- Ladin Wikipedia
- History of the Alps
- Romance languages
- Rhaetic language – an unrelated language spoken in ancient times around the area where Ladin is now spoken, which may have left a substrate influence
