= Cadore =

Historical region in Italy

Coordinates: 46°23′47″N 12°21′25″E

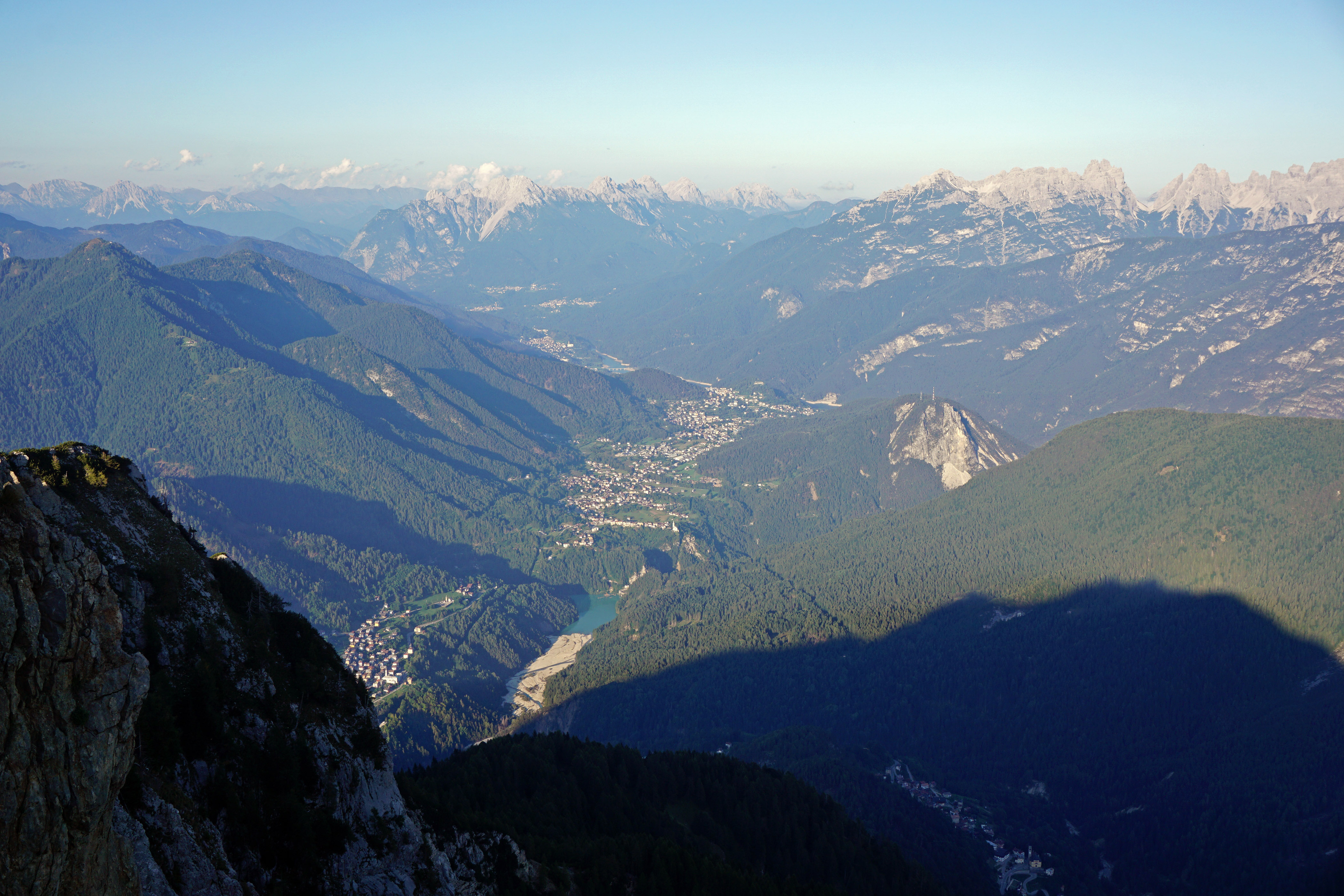
Cadore valley seen from Monte Rite

Cadore (Italian pronunciation: [kaˈdoːre]; Ladin: Ciadòre; Venetian: Cadór or, rarely, Cadòria; Austrian German: Cadober or Kadober; Sappada German: Kadour; Friulian: Cjadovri) is a historical region in the Italian region of Veneto, in the northernmost part of the province of Belluno bordering on Austria, the Trentino-Alto Adige/Südtirol and Friuli-Venezia Giulia. It is watered by the Piave River which has its source in the Carnic Alps. Once an undeveloped and poor district, the former contado (countship) of Cadore now has a thriving economy based on tourism and a small manufacturing industry, specialising in the production of glasses.

The celebrated Renaissance painter Titian was born in Cadore, probably in 1488–90, one of a family of four born to Gregorio Vecelli, a distinguished councillor and soldier descended from the counts. The painter's birthplace in Pieve di Cadore, in a locality named Arsenale between the castle and the village Sotto Castello, is open to visitors. Titian's wife, Cecilia, was also born in Cadore, the daughter of a barber.

== History ==
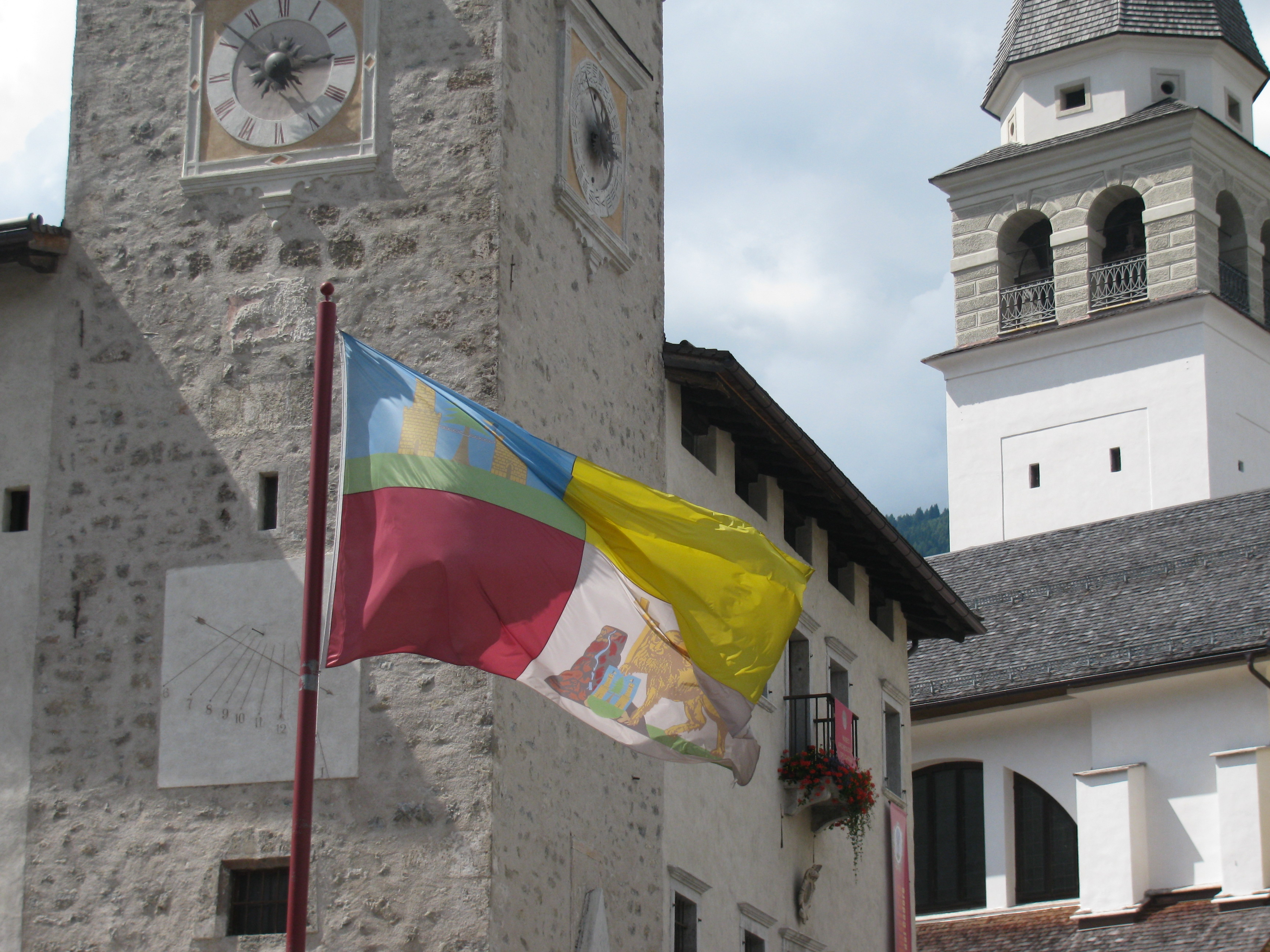
Palace and flag of Magnifica Comunità Cadorina

Originally populated by people who spoke Proto-Italic, Euganei and then by the Celtic Gauls, the area now known as Cadore was later conquered by the Romans during the second century BC and became part of the Regio X Venetia et Histria.

In the Late Antiquity era, Cadore was occupied by invading Germanic populations and was first declared part of the Duchy of Carinthia and finally, in 1077, part of the Patriarchate of Aquileia. From 1135 to 1335, Cadore was ruled by the da Camino family, the Counts of Cadore, who later became the Signori family of Treviso. It was briefly annexed to Tyrol and again was ceded to the Patriarchs of Aquileia. However, the comuni of Cadore always enjoyed a certain degree of self-government.

When the Republic of Venice conquered the neighbouring Friuli region in 1420 and put an end to the temporal power of the Patriarchs, the rulers of Cadore were forced to choose between aligning with Venetia or the Imperial. It declared its loyalty to the former, becoming one of many parts of the Terra ferma, administered by a local podestà.

The conflict between Venice and the Empire broke out again at the beginning of the 16th century, during the War of the League of Cambrai. In the prelude to the war, the Venetians and the Cadorines defeated Maximilian I, Holy Roman Emperor in 1508 at the Battle of Valle di Cadore, and again in 1509. Then, in 1511, Maximilian conquered the town of Cortina d'Ampezzo, which was incorporated into the Empire in 1516. Cortina, formerly considered part of Cadore, has since developed a distinct identity.

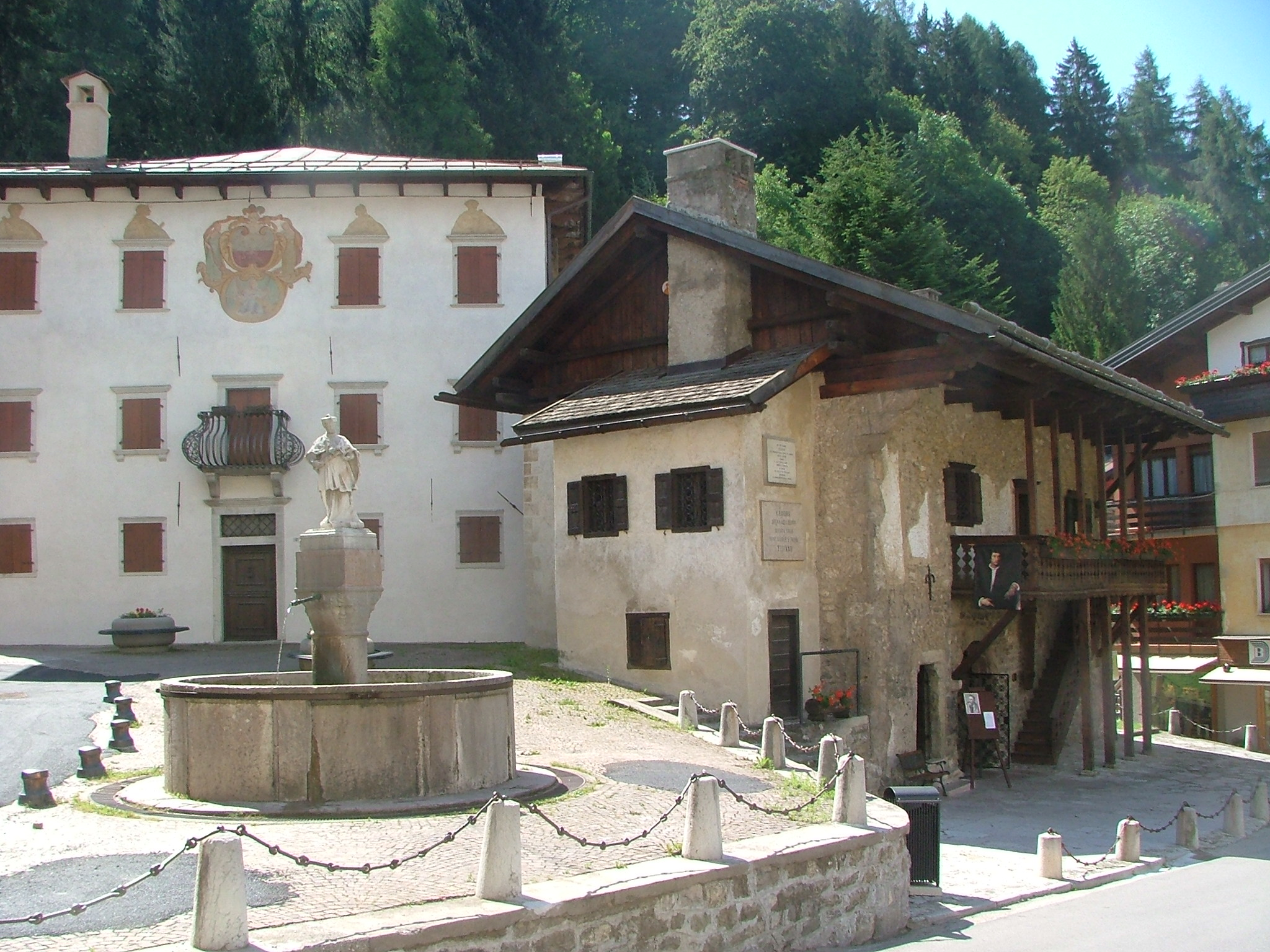
Titian house - Pieve di Cadore

Cadore remained part of the Venetian Republic until the Napoleonic War. A famous Venetian incumbent of the local post of Commisario del Cadore ('Commissioner'; in 1589) was Paolo Paruta. Napoleon I Bonaparte created a duché grand-fief, a rare, hereditary but nominal honor of ducal rank (extinguished in 1893) for his minister and admiral Jean-Baptiste Nompère de Champagny.

Being a part of the Kingdom of Lombardy–Venetia, Cadore was ruled by the Austrian Empire until 1866, when it was finally conquered by the newly formed Kingdom of Italy in the Third War of Independence. During the First World War, Cadore was on the Alpine Front and was the scene of many battles.

== Comuni of Cadore ==
Cadore is generally subdivided into Comelico, Sappada, Central Cadore and Boite Valley. The Cadore mountain community includes 22 comuni:

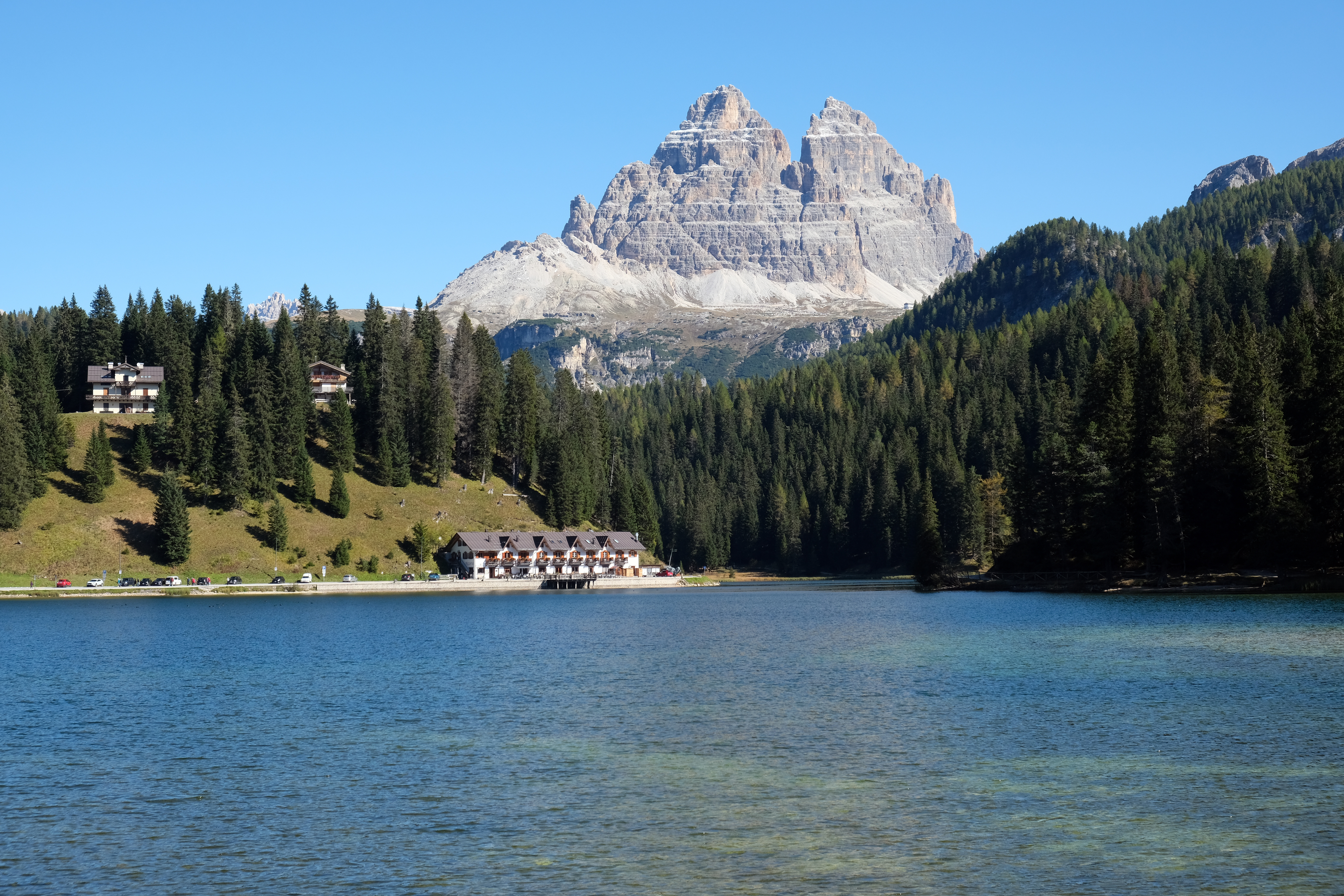
Tre Cime di Lavaredo (Cadorino dialect: Tré Thìme) and Lake Misurina (Meśorìna)

- Auronzo di Cadore
- Borca di Cadore
- Calalzo di Cadore
- Cibiana di Cadore
- Comelico Superiore
- Danta di Cadore
- Domegge di Cadore
- Lorenzago di Cadore
- Lozzo di Cadore
- Ospitale di Cadore
- Pelos di Cadore
- Perarolo di Cadore
- Pieve di Cadore
- San Nicolò di Comelico
- San Pietro di Cadore
- Santo Stefano di Cadore
- San Vito di Cadore
- Sappada
- Selva di Cadore
- Valle di Cadore
- Vigo di Cadore
- Vodo di Cadore
- Zoppè di Cadore

== See also ==
- Titian
- Tre Cime di Lavaredo
- Lake Misurina
- Antelao mountain
- Cadorino dialect
- Alpine Brigade Cadore

== Sources and references ==
- Storia del Cadore (in Italian)
- Heraldica.org Napoleonic heraldry
