= Istituto Ladin de la Dolomites =

Italian cultural organisation

Bellunese Institution to study and preserve the Ladin culture in 35 municipalities of Agordino, Cadore, Comelico and Zoldo.
