= Piave cheese =

Italian cheese

Piave
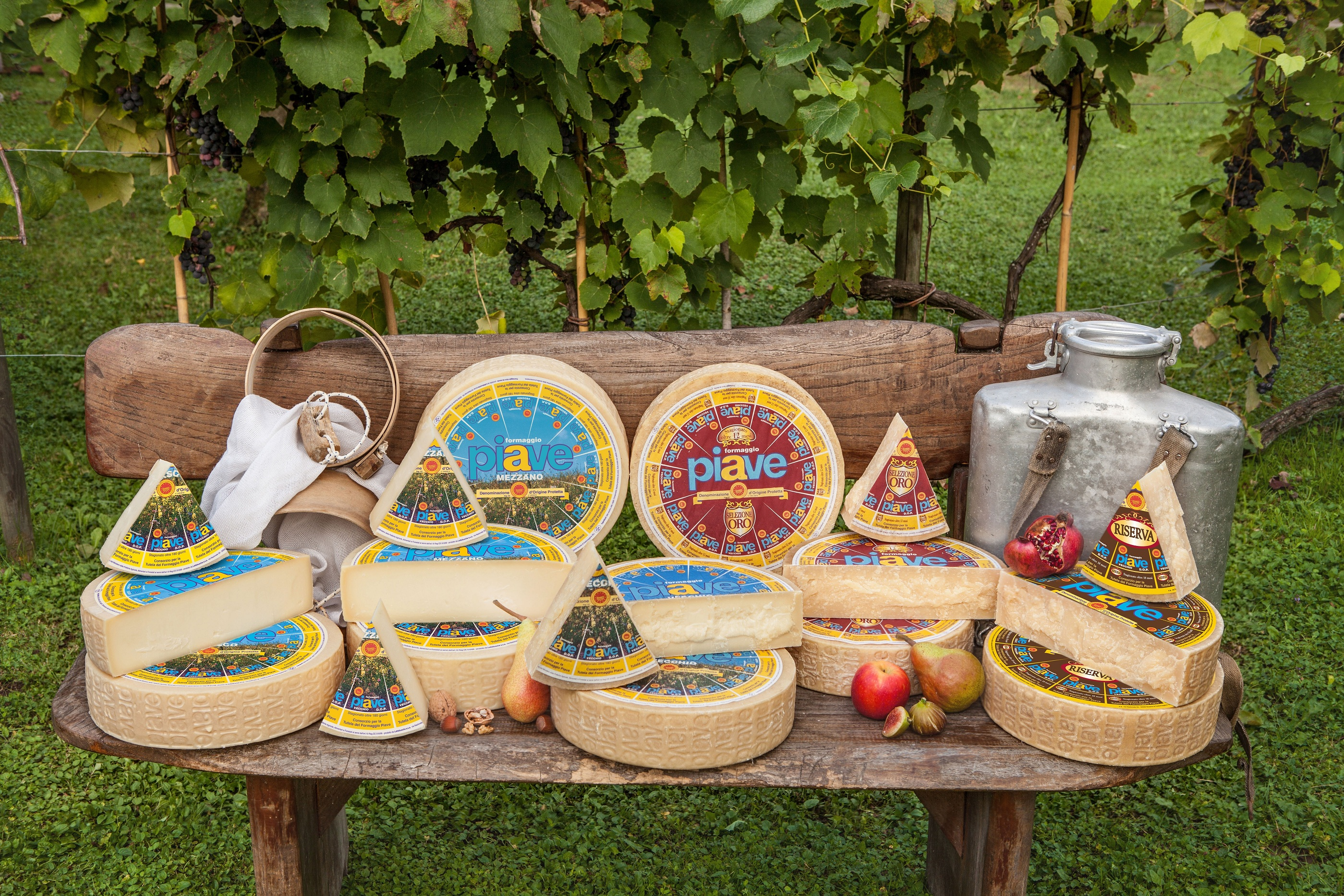
- Other names: Piave Fresco; Piave Mezzano; Piave Vecchio; Piave Vecchio Selezione Oro; Piave Vecchio Riserva
- Country of origin: Italy
- Region: Veneto
- Town: Province of Belluno
- Source of milk: Cows
- Texture: Hard
- Certification: PDO: 2010

Piave is an Italian cow's milk cheese that is named after the Piave river. As Piave has a protected designation of origin (DOP), the only "official" Piave is produced in the Dolomites area, province of Belluno, in the northernmost tip of the Veneto region.

Piave is a hard, cooked curd cheese, offered at five different ages:

- Piave Fresco (20 to 60 days aging – blue label)
- Piave Mezzano (61 to 180 days aging – blue label)
- Piave Vecchio (more than 6 months aging – blue label)
- Piave Vecchio Selezione Oro (more than 12 months aging – red label)
- Piave Vecchio Riserva (more than 18 months aging – black label)

Piave cheese has a dense texture, without holes, and is straw-yellow in hue. It has a slightly sweet flavor. Once fully aged, it becomes hard enough for grating, and it develops an intense, full-bodied flavor.
As an indication of its certification, the rind is branded repeatedly with "Piave".

Piave is sold throughout Europe and in the US as a hard cheese, at which point its taste resembles that of a young Parmesan. The red label is aged at least one year and is called Vecchio (Piave Vecchio Selezione Oro), while the blue label is softer. Both are available all over Europe and can also be found in the US, primarily at specialty shops.

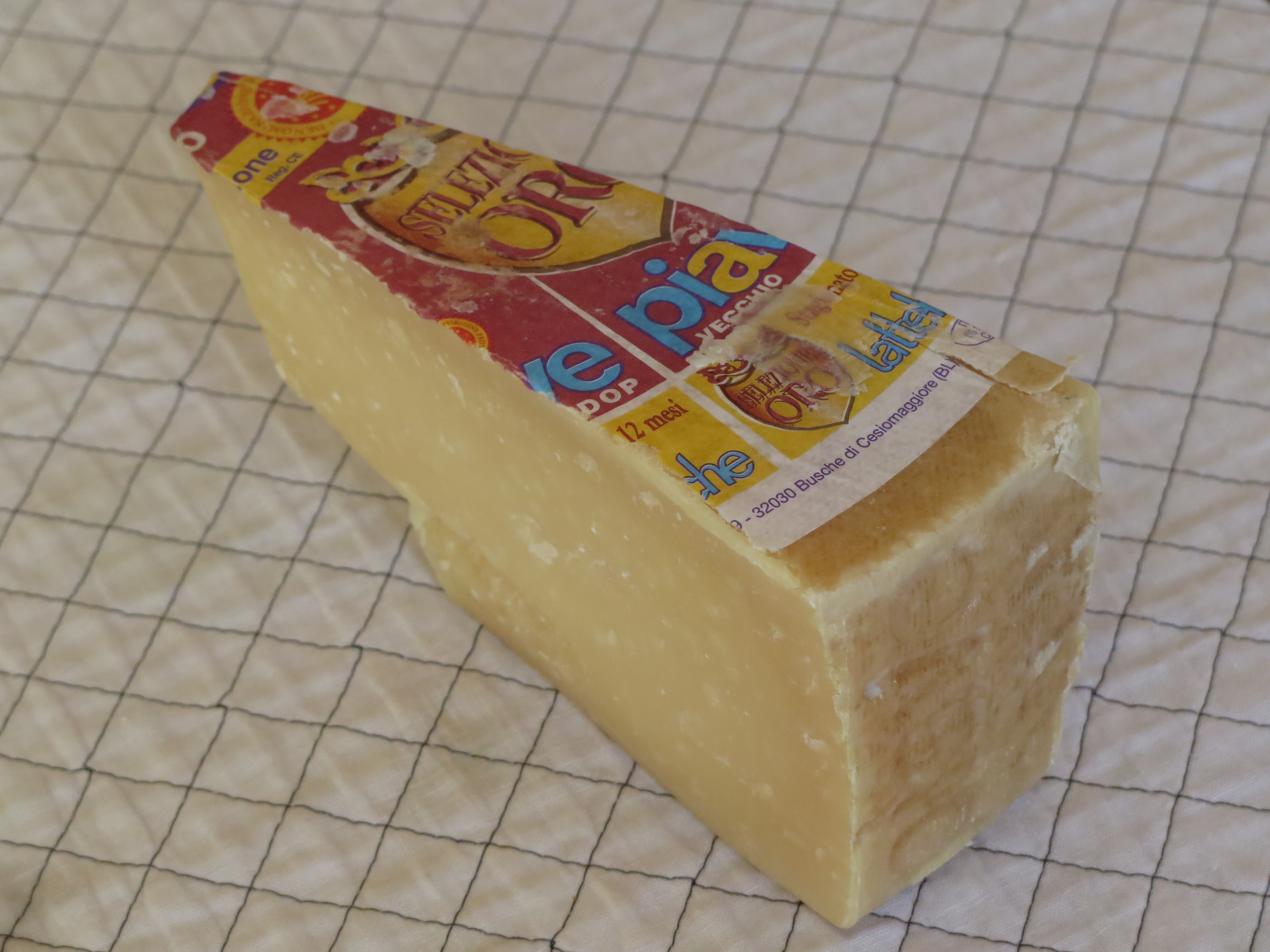
A slice of Piave vecchio selezione oro

== See also ==
- List of Italian cheeses
