= Vigo di Cadore =

- Comune
- Comune di Vigo di Cadore
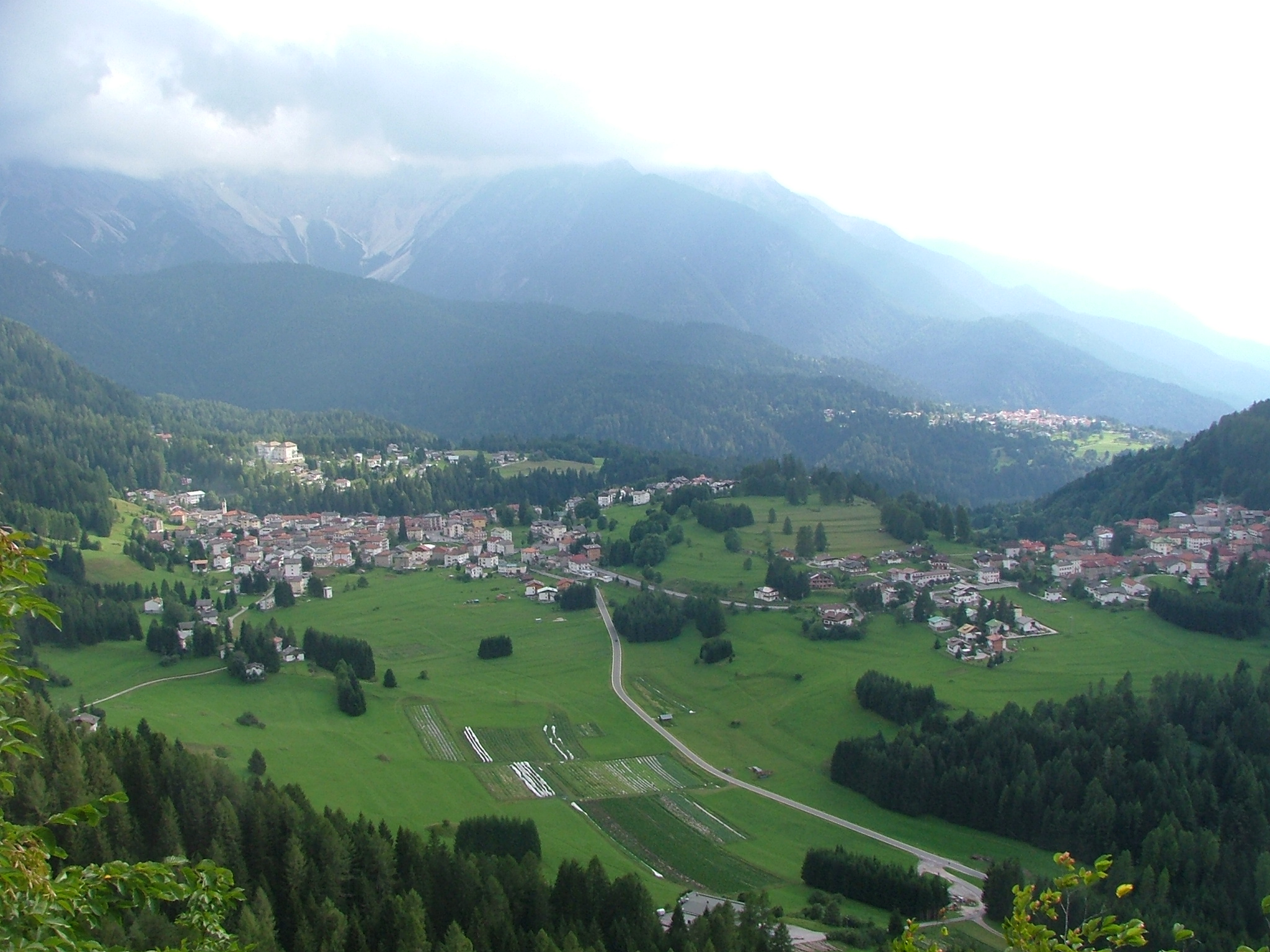

- Location within Italy Location within Veneto
- Coordinates: 46°30′N 12°28′E
- Country: Italy
- Region: Veneto
- Province: Belluno (BL)
- Frazioni: Laggio, Pelos, Pinié

Government
  - Mayor: Antonio Mazzucco

Area
  - Total: 70.8 km^{2} (27.3 sq mi)
- Elevation: 947 m (3,107 ft)

Population (Dec. 2004)
  - Total: 1,641
  - Density: 23.2/km^{2} (60.0/sq mi)
- Demonym: Vigesi
- Time zone: UTC+1 (CET)
  - Summer (DST): UTC+2 (CEST)
- Postal code: 32040
- Dialing code: 0435
- Patron saint: St. Martin of Tours
- Saint day: November 11

Vigo di Cadore is a comune (municipality) in the province of Belluno in the Italian region of Veneto, located about 120 kilometres (75 mi) north of Venice and about 45 kilometres (28 mi) northeast of Belluno.

== Main sights ==
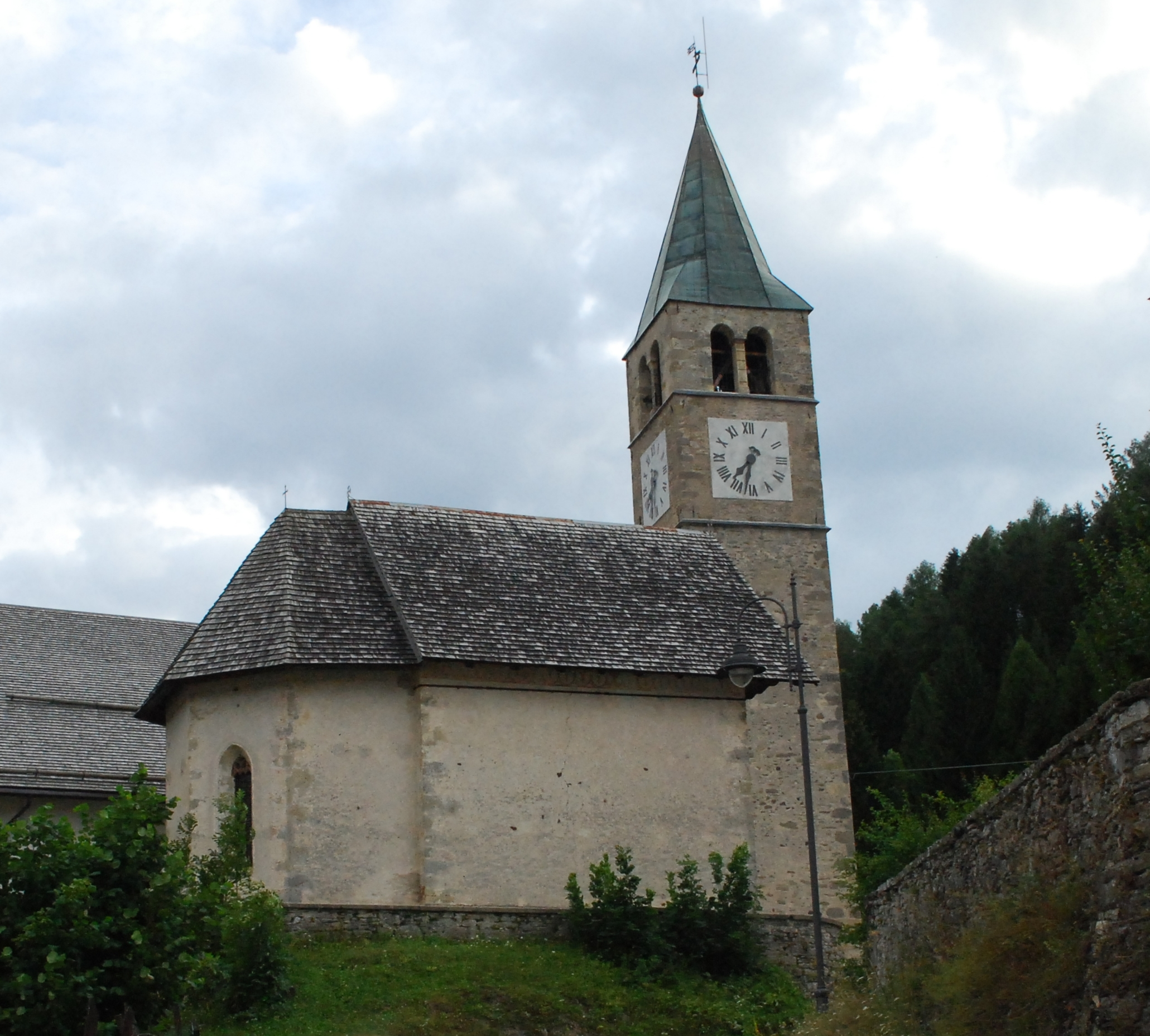
The Church

Vigo's main attraction is the church of Sant'Orsola, built in the 14th century by Ainardo da Vigo, the son of the da Camino's family last podestà of Cadore. In the frazione of Laggio is the church of Santa Margherita (c. 1305), with Byzantine-style frescoes. Speech is an eastern dialect of Ladin.
