= Colle Santa Lucia =

- Comune
- Comune di Colle Santa Lucia
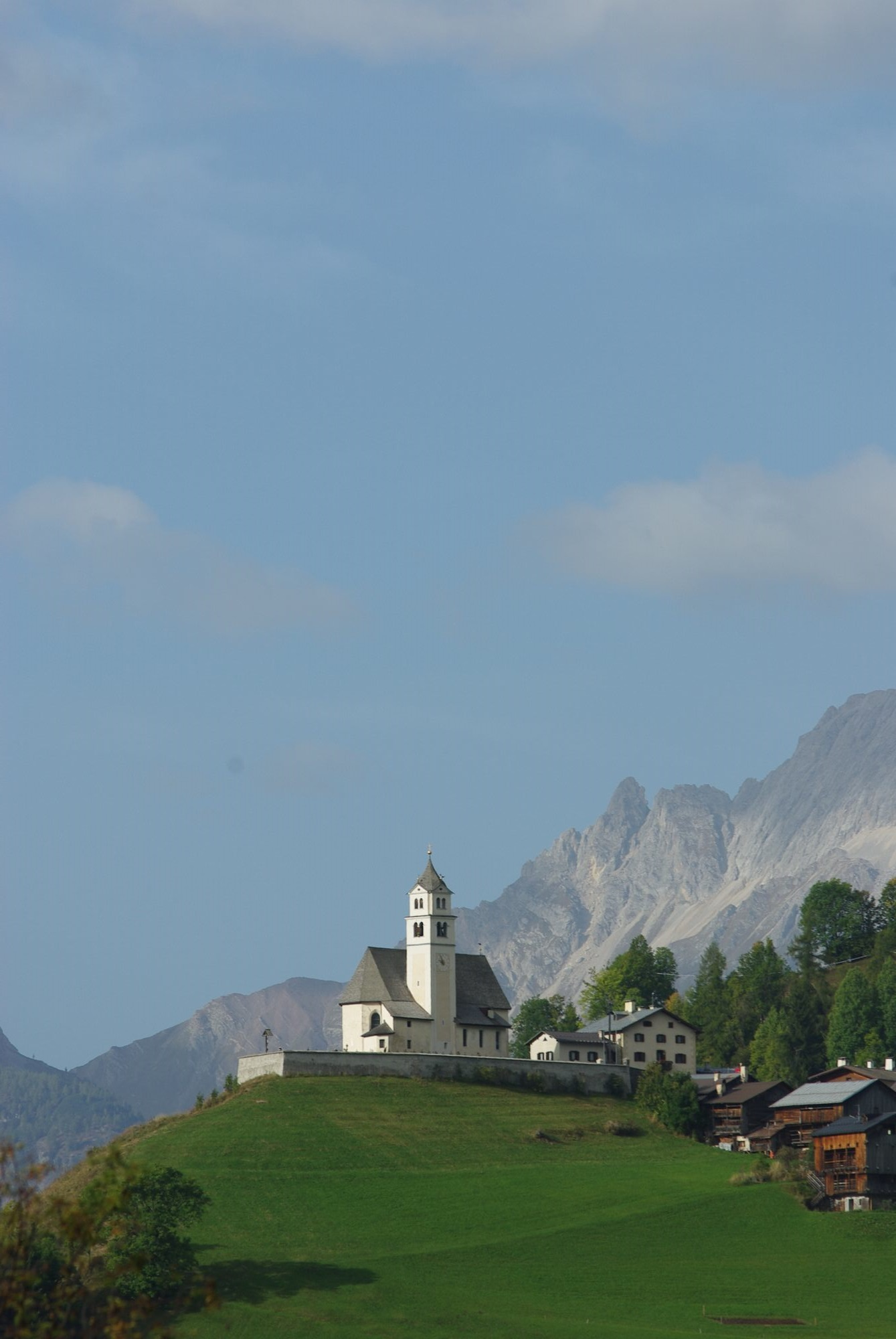
- Colle Santa Lucia

- Location within Italy Location within Veneto
- Coordinates: 46°27′N 12°1′E
- Country: Italy
- Region: Veneto
- Province: Belluno (BL)

Area
  - Total: 15.3 km^{2} (5.9 sq mi)

Population (Dec. 2004)
  - Total: 408
  - Density: 26.7/km^{2} (69.1/sq mi)
- Time zone: UTC+1 (CET)
  - Summer (DST): UTC+2 (CEST)
- Postal code: 32020
- Dialing code: 0437
- Website: www.collesantalucia.eu

Colle Santa Lucia (Italian pronunciation: [ˈkɔlle ˈsanta luˈtʃiːa]; Ladin language: Col) is a comune (municipality) in the Province of Belluno in the Italian region of Veneto, located about 120 kilometres (75 mi) north of Venice and about 40 kilometres (25 mi) northwest of Belluno. As of 31 December 2004, it had a population of 408 and an area of 15.3 square kilometres (5.9 mi^{2}). The population speaks a Venetian dialect called Ladin Venetian that is heavily influenced by the Ladin language.

Colle Santa Lucia borders the following municipalities: Alleghe, Cortina d'Ampezzo, Livinallongo del Col di Lana, Rocca Pietore, San Vito di Cadore, Selva di Cadore.

== Demographic evolution ==
Historical population

Year	Pop.	±%
1861	?	—
1871	?	—
1881	?	—
1901	?	—
1911	?	—

Year	Pop.	±%
1921	754	—
1931	719	−4.6%
1936	664	−7.6%
1951	677	+2.0%
1961	623	−8.0%

Year	Pop.	±%
1971	603	−3.2%
1981	556	−7.8%
1991	480	−13.7%
2001	418	−12.9%

Source: Data from ISTAT
