= Province of Belluno =

Province of Belluno Provincia di Belluno (Italian) Provinz Belluno (Austrian German) Provinzia de Belum (Ladin)
- Province
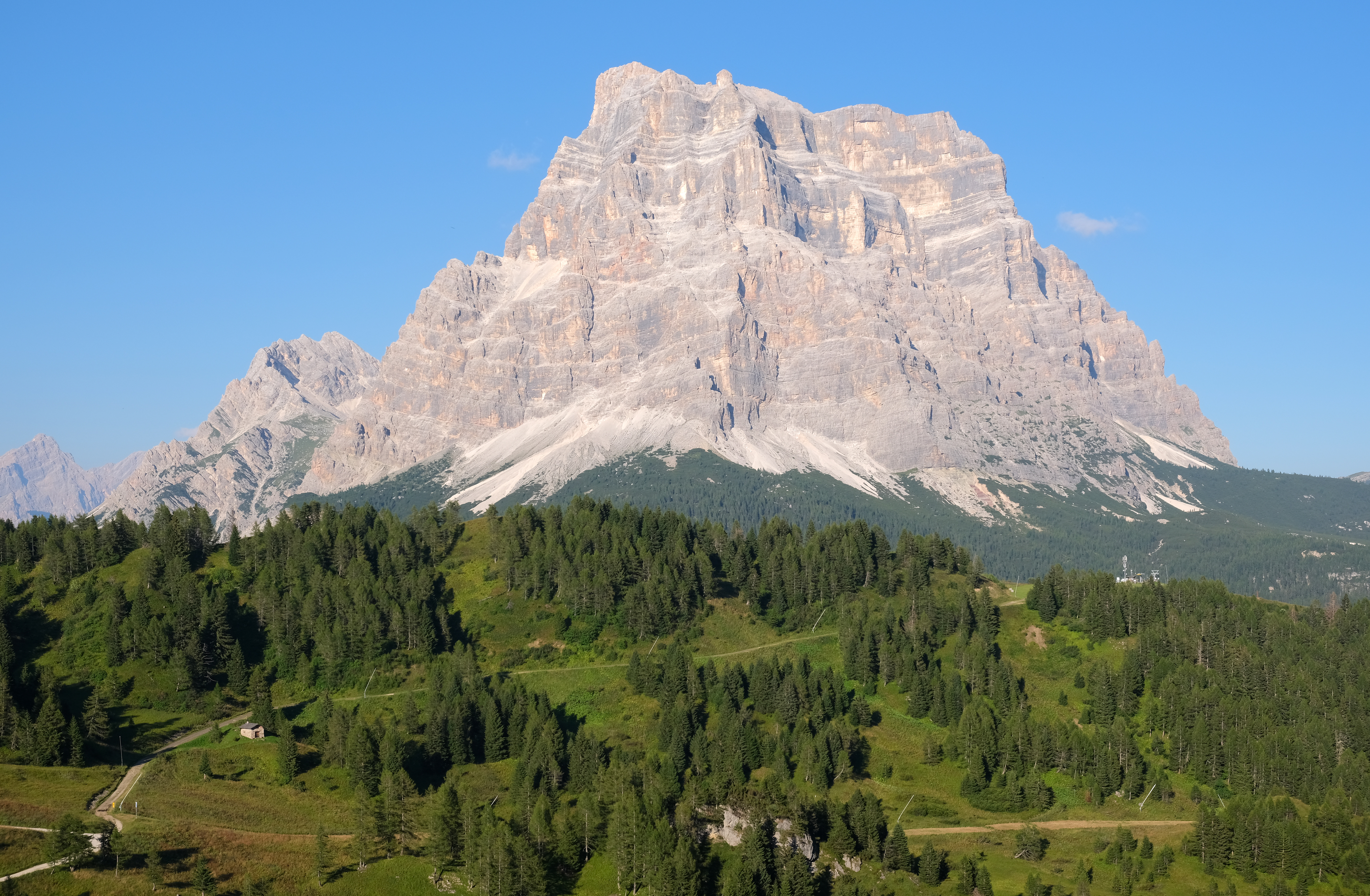
- Monte Pelmo

- Flag Coat of arms

- Location of the province of Belluno in Italy
- Coordinates: 46°8′27″N 12°12′56″E
- Country: Italy
- Region: Veneto
- Capital(s): Belluno
- Municipalities: 60

Government
  - President: Marco Staunovo Polacco (Liga Veneta–Lega)

Area
  - Total: 3,610.20 km^{2} (1,393.91 sq mi)

Population (2026)
  - Total: 197,265
  - Density: 54.6410/km^{2} (141.520/sq mi)

GDP
  - Total: €6.729 billion (2021)
  - Per capita: €33,780 (2021)
- Time zone: UTC+1 (CET)
  - Summer (DST): UTC+2 (CEST)
- Postal code: 32100
- Telephone prefix: 0437
- Vehicle registration: BL
- ISTAT code: 025
- Website: www.provincia.belluno.it

The province of Belluno (Italian: provincia di Belluno; Austrian German: provinz Belluno; Ladin: provinzia de Belum) is a province in the region of Veneto in Italy. Its capital is the city of Belluno.

It has a population of 197,265 in an area of 3,610 square kilometres (1,390 mi^{2}) across its 60 municipalities.

== History ==
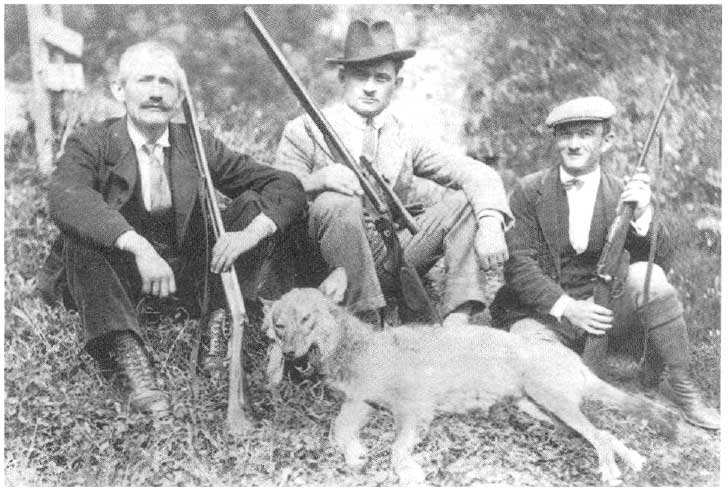
Gray wolf killed at Malga Campo Bon (Comelico) on 24 May 1929 by Antonio "Tunin" Mina.

The oldest archaeological find in the province is that of Lagole di Calalzo, in Cadore, belonging to a c. 5th century BC sanctuary dedicated to a health god of Paleoveneti. A larger site, a necropolis, has been excavated in the commune of Mel. Findings from these sites are now housed in the Museums of Pieve di Cadore and Mel.

From the 10th to 12th century the area that became Belluno was part of the March of Verona, a march of the Holy Roman Empire. During the 14th century much of the area came under the control of the Carraresi lords of Padua. In 1404 the Carraresi territories, including Feltre and Belluno, were conquered by the Republic of Venice, becoming part of the Venetian Domini di Terraferma. Cadore in the north also became part of the Domini di Terraferma following the Venetian conquest of Friuli in 1420. In 1511 Maximilian I, Holy Roman Emperor conquered the town of Cortina d'Ampezzo, detaching it from Cadore and incorporating it into the County of Tyrol.

Venetian rule lasted until 1797 when Venice was conquered by the French First Republic during the Italian campaigns of the French Revolutionary Wars. Rather than being annexed by France or its satellites, the Venetian territory east of Lake Garda, including Belluno, was ceded to the Habsburg monarchy (Austria) in the Treaty of Campo Formio, thereby becoming the Venetian Province. This state of affairs only lasted until 1805 however, as Austria (the Austrian Empire since 1804) ceded the Venetian Province to the Napoleonic Kingdom of Italy in the Treaty of Pressburg. Within the Kingdom of Italy, modern Belluno roughly corresponded to the Piave department.

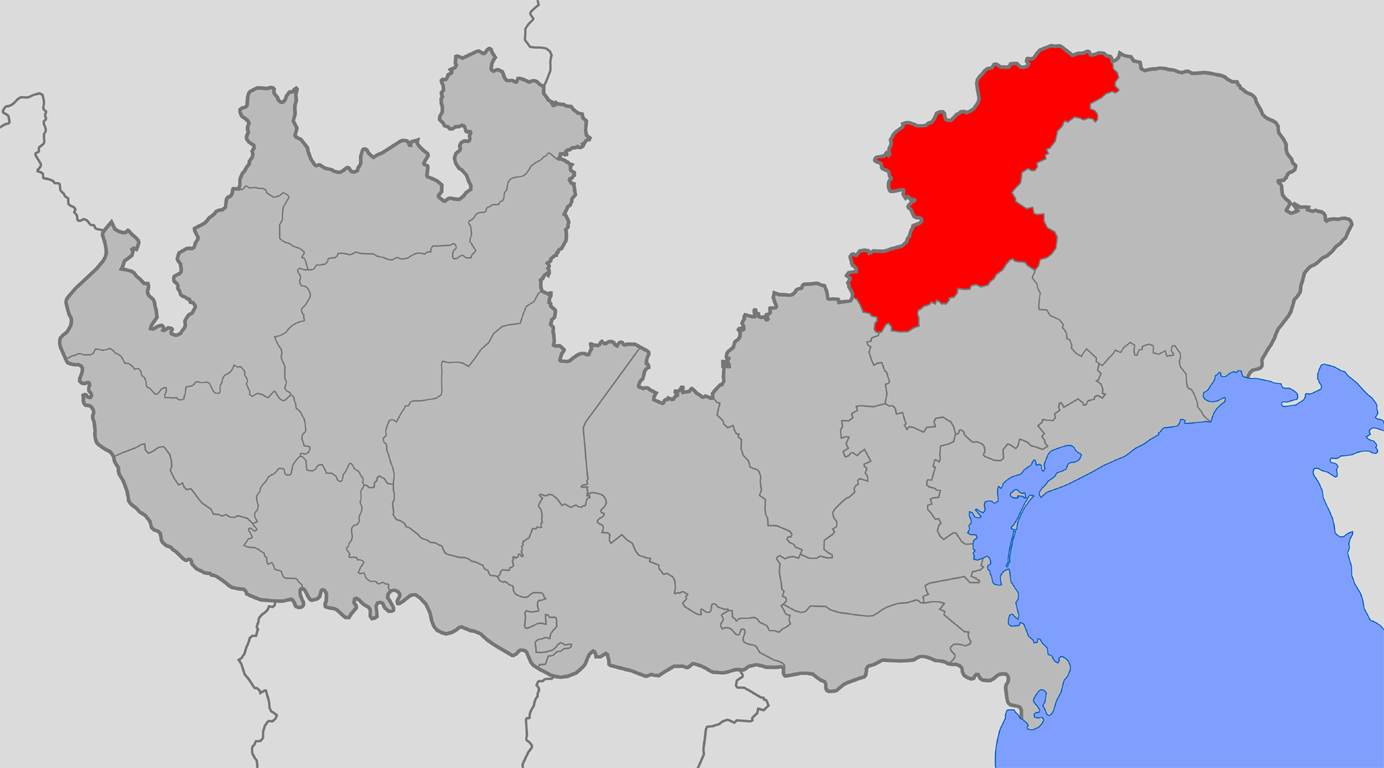
The Province of Belluno shown within of the Austrian Lombardy–Venetia.

After the Napoleonic Wars the former Venetian Province was returned to Austria by the 1815 Congress of Vienna, becoming part of the newly formed Kingdom of Lombardy–Venetia. Under Austrian rule Lombardy–Venetia was organised into provinces roughly corresponding to the Napoleonic departments; the Piave department was succeeded by the province of Belluno, which broadly coincides with the modern province.

During the unification of Italy Austria lost Lombardy–Venetia to what became the Kingdom of Italy (the western part (i.e. Lombardy) in 1859, the eastern part (i.e. Venetia and Mantua) including Belluno in 1866).

In 1919, following World War I, Italy obtained what had been the southern part of the County of Tyrol from Austria-Hungary: Trentino and South Tyrol. In 1923 Cortina d'Ampezzo, Colle Santa Lucia and Livinallongo del Col di Lana were detached from this territory and added to Belluno.

In 1943, when the Italian government signed an armistice with the Allies, the province was occupied by Nazi Germany, which reorganised it (along with the region of Trentino-Südtirol) as the Operation Zone of the Alpine Foothills and put it under the administration of Gauleiter Franz Hofer. The region was de facto annexed to the German Reich until the end of the war. This status ended along with the Nazi regime and Italian rule was restored in 1945.

== Geography ==
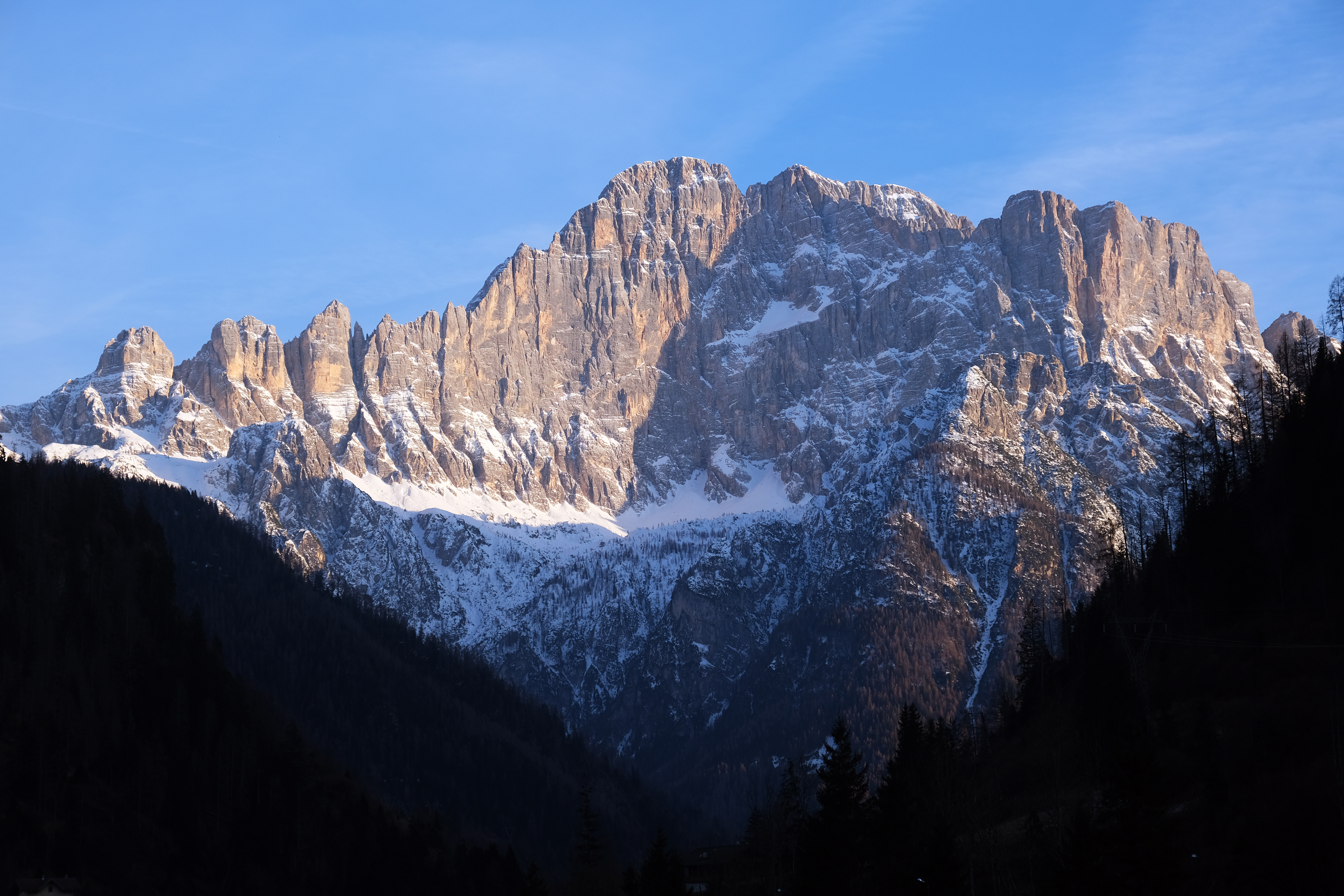
Monte Civetta

Situated in the Alps, the province of Belluno consists almost entirely of mountainous terrain. It encompasses the natural and historical regions of Cadore, Feltrino, Alpago, Val di Zoldo, Agordino, Comelico and Ampezzano. The province is home to the Dolomites, including Tofane, Marmolada, Tre Cime di Lavaredo, and Antelao. For much of its course, the river Piave runs through Belluno, as do its tributaries the Boite and the Cordevole.

The southern part is called Valbelluna, the widest and most populous valley of the province, which is bordered by the Venetian Prealps. The National Park of Belluno Dolomites is located in the province.

=== Climate ===
The province of Belluno's climate is among the most severe in the Alps. It is mostly influenced by the continental, provided by the Dolomites and it is very similar to the eastern Tyrol's climate, or even more severe in the Prealps of the southern side.

The province may be divided in the following climatic zones:

- The lowest valleys, at approximately 700 metres (2,300 ft), that usually have an almost mild climate, at the boundary line between the Oceanic climate Cfb and the humid continental climate Dfb: the coldest month's average is usually between 0 °C and −3 °C. The summers are hot but not as hot as the valleys of the rivers Po and Adige. The hottest month's average temperature is between 18 °C and 21 °C. This area, as most of the oriental Alps, is very wet. Belluno's precipitation average is above 1300 mm per year, snow is usual during all the winter months, and may occur even in March or November. Some years the winter may be milder due to the humidity, with averages around the freezing point, and big snowfalls with frequent snowbound. Main cities in this area: Belluno, Feltre, Seren del Grappa.
- The midland's valleys, between 700 m and 1500 m (or until 1300 meters in the Prealps area), which have a typical humid continental climate Dfb. This climate is more severe in the extreme northern or southwestern regions of the province, while the central region (near Arabba or Cortina d'Ampezzo) is usually milder. Winter's average temperature is between −7 °C and −5 °C in the North and Southwest during January, and between −5 °C and −3 °C around the central region. The coldest town, Santo Stefano di Cadore, at an elevation of only 900 meters, has temperature averages in January between −7 °C and −6 °C. Other towns of relatively low elevations have really low averages, which would be found only above 1700 meters in other Italians provinces, as well as in any French or western Swiss provinces. The snow season depends on the altitude. Between 700 and 1200 meters, from early November until the middle of March, between 1200 and 1500 (or 1600 in Arabba), from late October until late April. The summer is usually wet and mild, but hotter than areas at the same altitude in the occidental valleys. In the lower lands (around 900 meters) temperature average around 16 °C or 17 °C. In higher lands (around 1400 meters) average around 14 °C. Rain is usual from March until November. Some towns and villages with this climate: Santo Stefano di Cadore (severe), Cortina d'Ampezzo (mild – sometimes Cfb), Arabba (mild if considered the altitude), Auronzo di Cadore (severe), Danta di Cadore, Sappada.

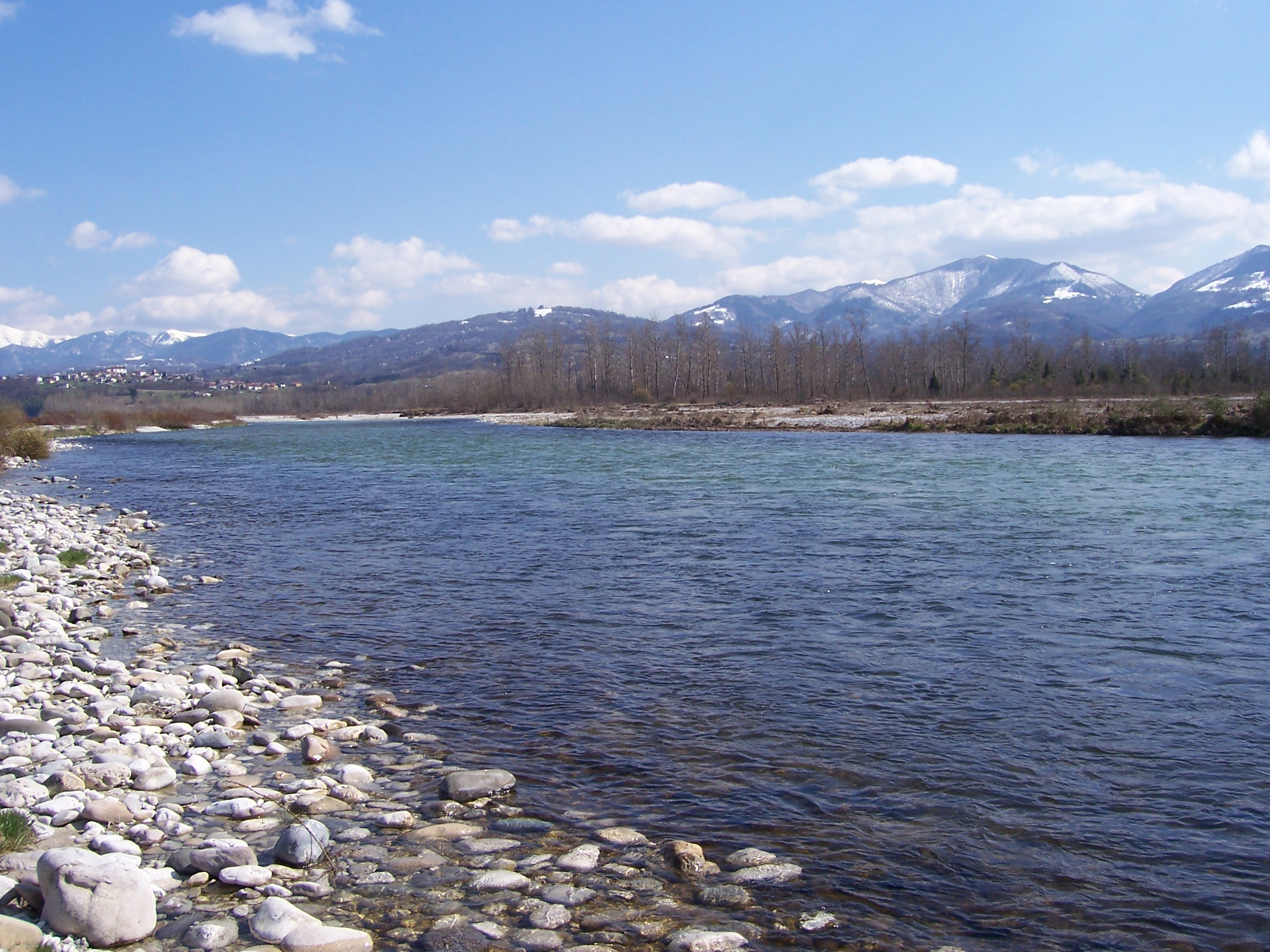
Piave river from Mel to Santa Giustina

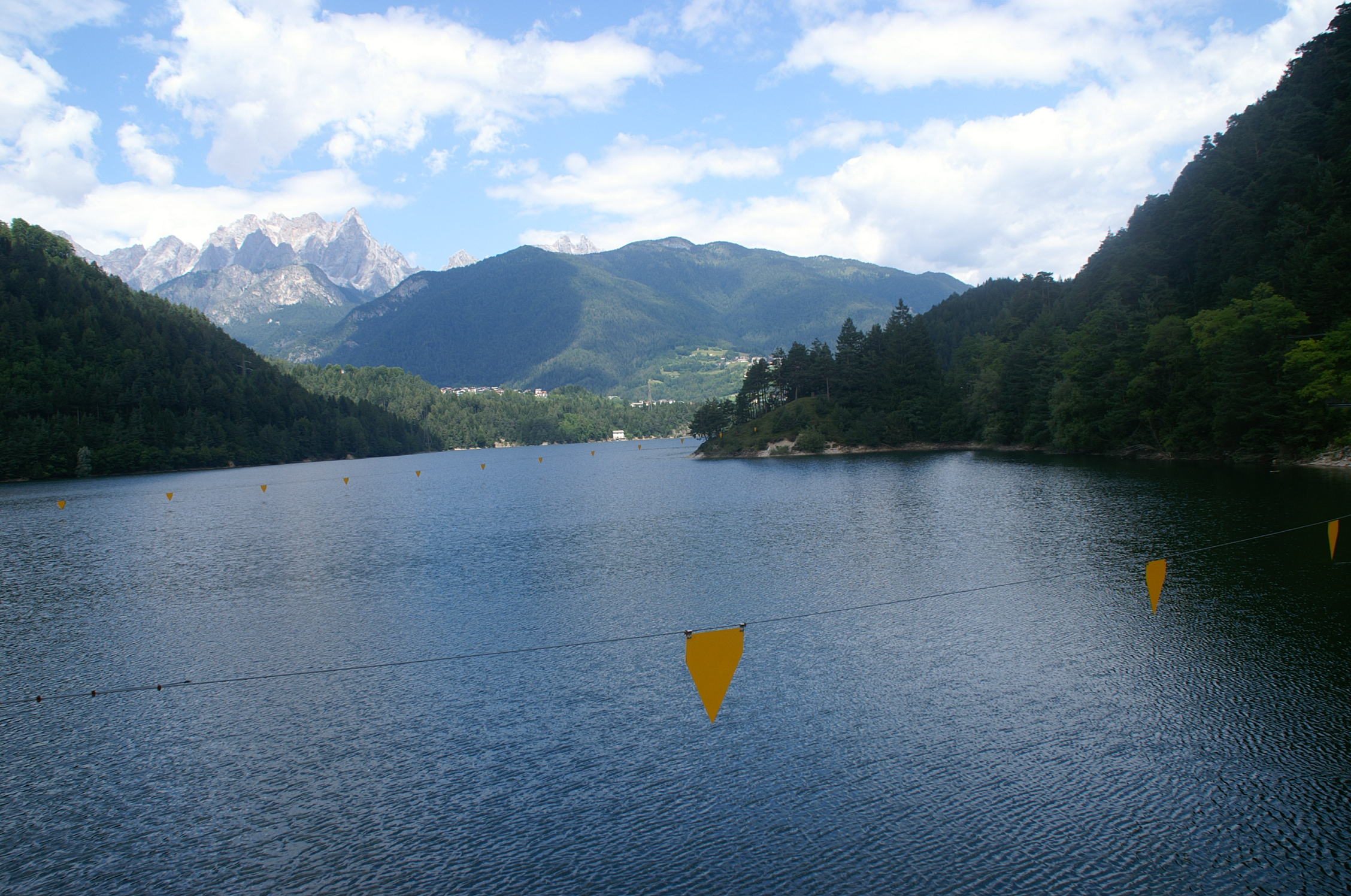
Cadore Lake

- The valleys around 1500 to 1900 meters, with cold continental climate Dfc. It is the wettest climate of the province. Some areas on the southern side of the province may receive more than 2,000 mm (79 in) of precipitation per year, especially near the lakes, which can not make the climate mild in this region, as in other alpine regions. Winters are very cold and snowy, with temperature averages between −9 °C and −5 °C. The snow season usually starts in late September and lasts until late May Snows are not frequents, but can occur even during the summer, in early September or late August. The summer is rainy, sometimes foggy, and cool. Temperatures average in July between 10 °C and 12 °C. This area has a very few numbers of sunny days per year, and the average sunshine hours per day is also quite low, around 1 hour or less in January and around 4 or 5 hours in June and July. Due to the severity of the climate, only a few villages are found in this area, usually fractions of other towns. One of the most inhabited places in this area is Misurina, a village near the lake with the same name.
- The high lands, above 1900 meters, with mountain tundra climate ET. There are no inhabited places in this area. All the months have temperature averages below 10 °C. Above 2000 meters the precipitation rate starts to decrease. The higher places are drier, and sunnier. The winter temperature averages in the mountain areas vary according to the altitude, and are always milder than the valley's temperatures at the same quote. In January, the average temperature in mountains areas are around −3 °C at 1500 m (while they can reach −6 °C in valleys), −6 °C at 2000 m, −8 °C at 2500 m and −10 °C at 3000 meters. Summers are cold above 2000 meters. The average temperature in July is around 12 °C at 1500 m, 8 °C at 2000 m, 6 °C at 2500 and 3 °C at 3000 meters. In Belluno province, the perpetual frost climate EF is not found, because the highest point, the Marmolada, at a few more than 3200 meters, has summer's average temperature of approximately 20 °C.

== Municipalities ==
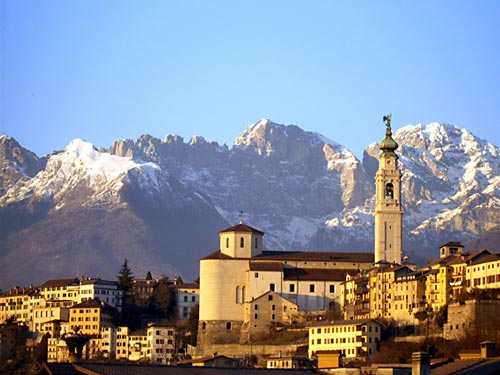
Belluno

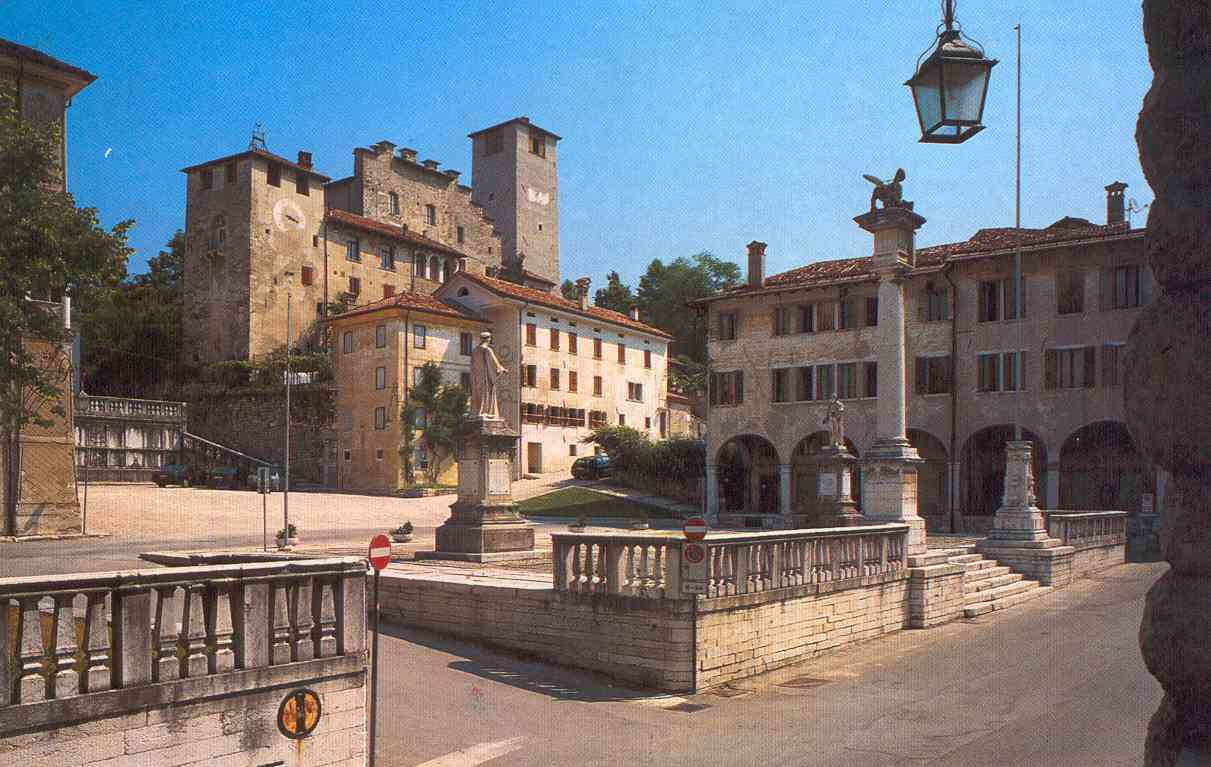
Feltre

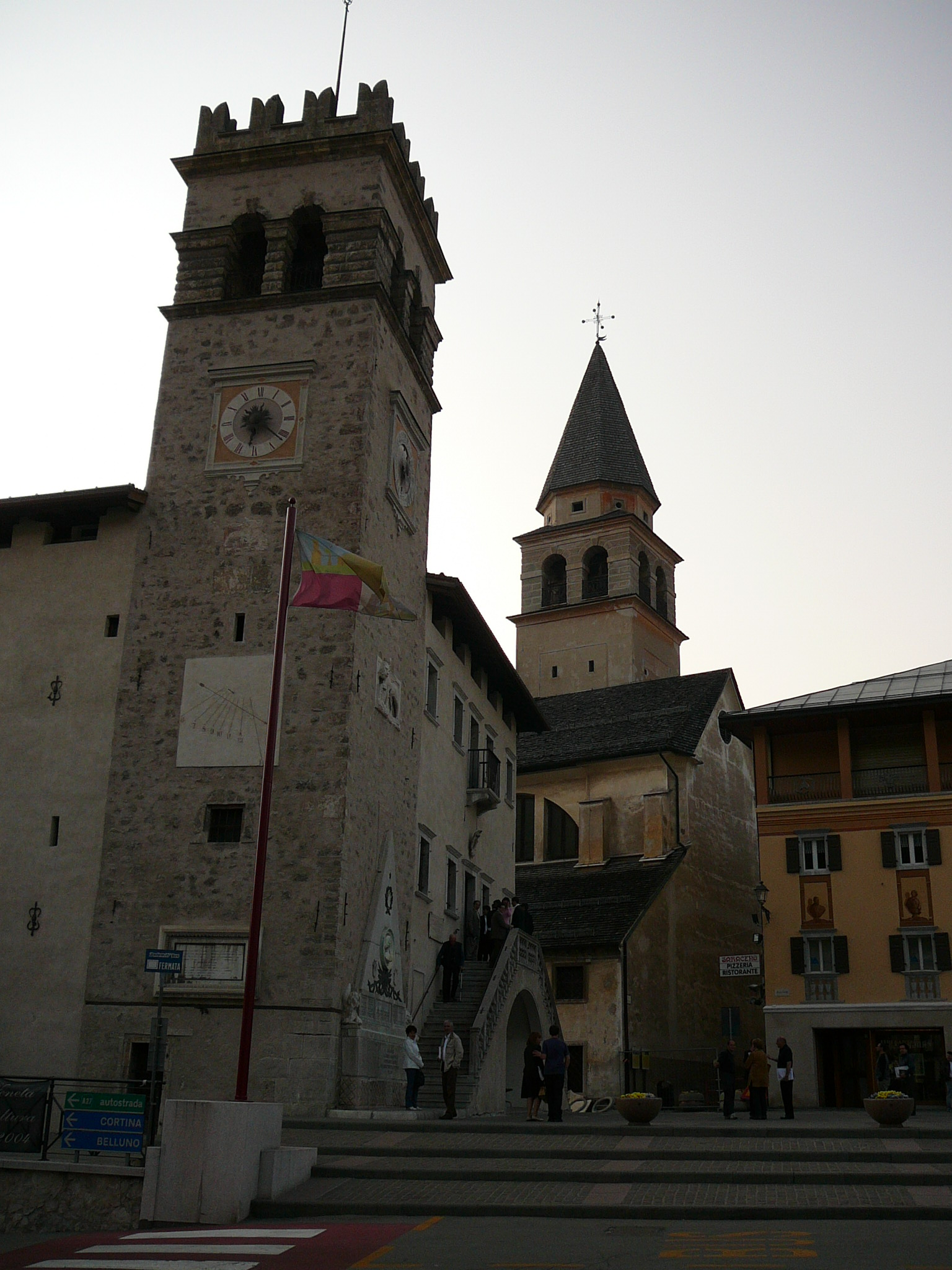
Pieve di Cadore

The province has 60 municipalities:

- Agordo
- Alleghe
- Alpago
- Arsiè
- Auronzo di Cadore
- Belluno
- Borca di Cadore
- Borgo Valbelluna
- Calalzo di Cadore
- Canale d'Agordo
- Cencenighe Agordino
- Cesiomaggiore
- Chies d'Alpago
- Cibiana di Cadore
- Colle Santa Lucia
- Comelico Superiore
- Cortina d'Ampezzo
- Danta di Cadore
- Domegge di Cadore
- Falcade
- Feltre
- Fonzaso
- Gosaldo
- La Valle Agordina
- Lamon
- Limana
- Livinallongo del Col di Lana
- Longarone
- Lorenzago di Cadore
- Lozzo di Cadore
- Ospitale di Cadore
- Pedavena
- Perarolo di Cadore
- Pieve di Cadore
- Ponte nelle Alpi
- Rivamonte Agordino
- Rocca Pietore
- San Gregorio nelle Alpi
- San Nicolò di Comelico
- San Pietro di Cadore
- San Tomaso Agordino
- San Vito di Cadore
- Santa Giustina
- Santo Stefano di Cadore
- Sedico
- Selva di Cadore
- Seren del Grappa
- Setteville
- Sospirolo
- Soverzene
- Sovramonte
- Taibon Agordino
- Tambre
- Val di Zoldo
- Vallada Agordina
- Valle di Cadore
- Vigo di Cadore
- Vodo Cadore
- Voltago Agordino
- Zoppè di Cadore

== Demographics ==
Historical population (current borders)
Year	Pop.	±%
1871	189,405	—
1881	194,097	+2.5%
1901	213,450	+10.0%
1911	233,991	+9.6%
1921	257,926	+10.2%
1931	235,479	−8.7%
1936	215,008	−8.7%
1951	236,716	+10.1%
1961	233,398	−1.4%
1971	219,741	−5.9%
1981	218,956	−0.4%
1991	210,712	−3.8%
2001	208,191	−1.2%
2011	208,695	+0.2%
2021	198,676	−4.8%
Source: ISTAT (Note: 1861-1936 figures exclude Sappada, which is now in the province of Udine.)

As of 2026, the population is 197,265, of which 49.2% are male, and 50.8% are female. Minors make up 12.8% of the population, and seniors make up 28.9%.

=== Linguistic minorities ===
Ladin language in the province of Belluno: Adige Ladin area Cadore Ladin area Ladin-Veneto area

In the province, language minorities are present and recognized by law:

- a Ladin minority, recognized in 42 municipalities, is present in the regions of Ladinia (Colle Santa Lucia-Col, Livinallongo del Col di Lana-Fodom and Cortina d'Ampezzo-Anpezo), Cadore, Agordino and Zoldo.
- a German-speaking minority was present in the municipalities of Farra d'Alpago and Tambre (now extinct)

=== Foreigners ===
As of 2025, immigrants make up 13.0% of the population. The 5 largest foreign countries of birth are Switzerland, Ukraine, Morocco, Germany, and Romania.

== Economy ==
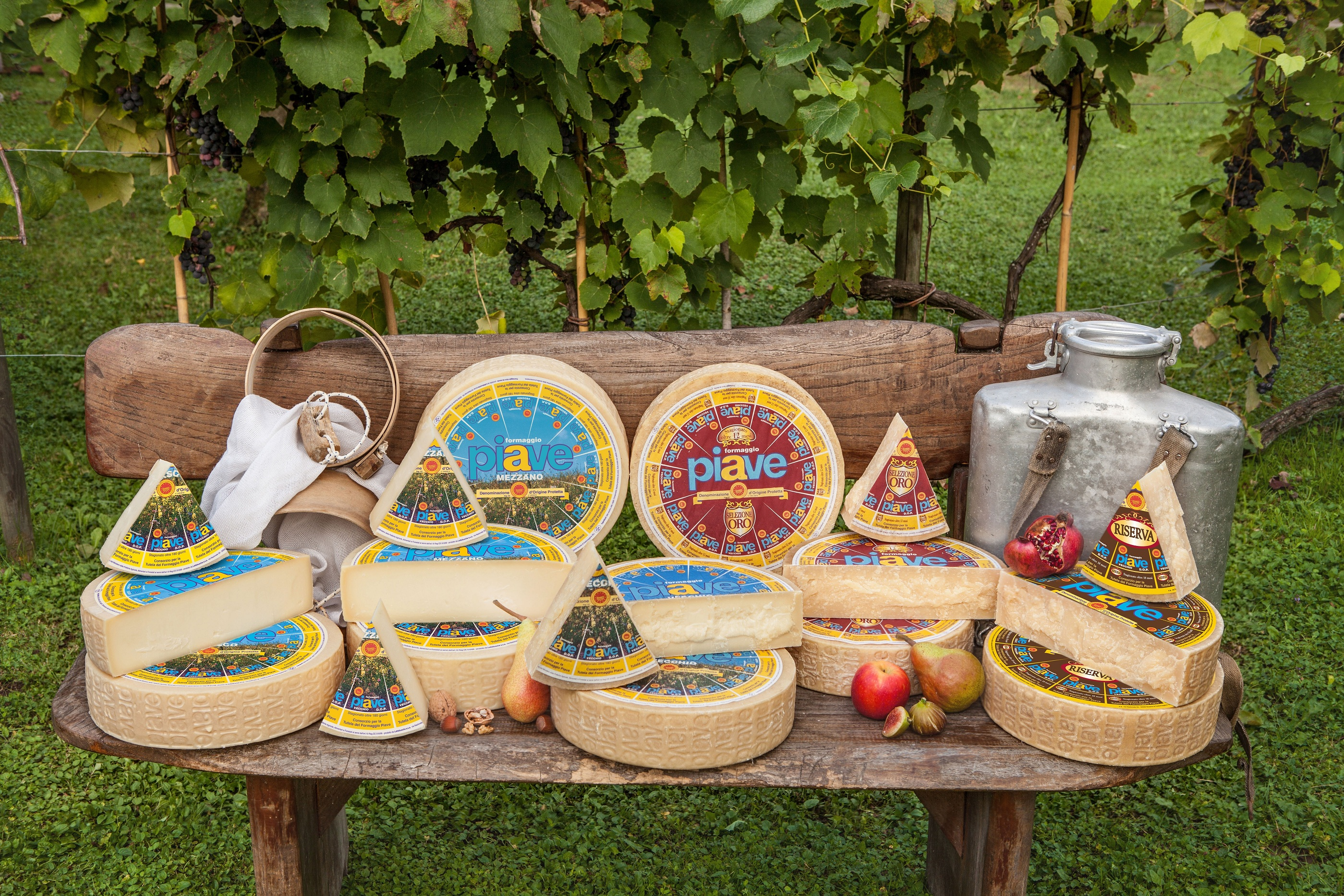
Piave cheese

Until recently, the province's economy was based on poor mountain agriculture, now less important, with the exception of the cultivation of beans in the Lamon highlands and the production of Piave cheese in the Dolomites valleys. Today, Belluno has one of the most important industrial sectors of northern Italy, the production of eyeglasses (Luxottica originally had its headquarters in Agordo, for example). Also important are the manufacturing sectors of home appliances (Zanussi and others) and bathroom fixtures (Ceramica Dolomite, IdealStandard).

One of the most important factors of the Bellunese economy is tourism. Cortina d'Ampezzo, Alleghe, Arabba, Sappada, and other locations are renowned in Italy and abroad.

== Transport ==
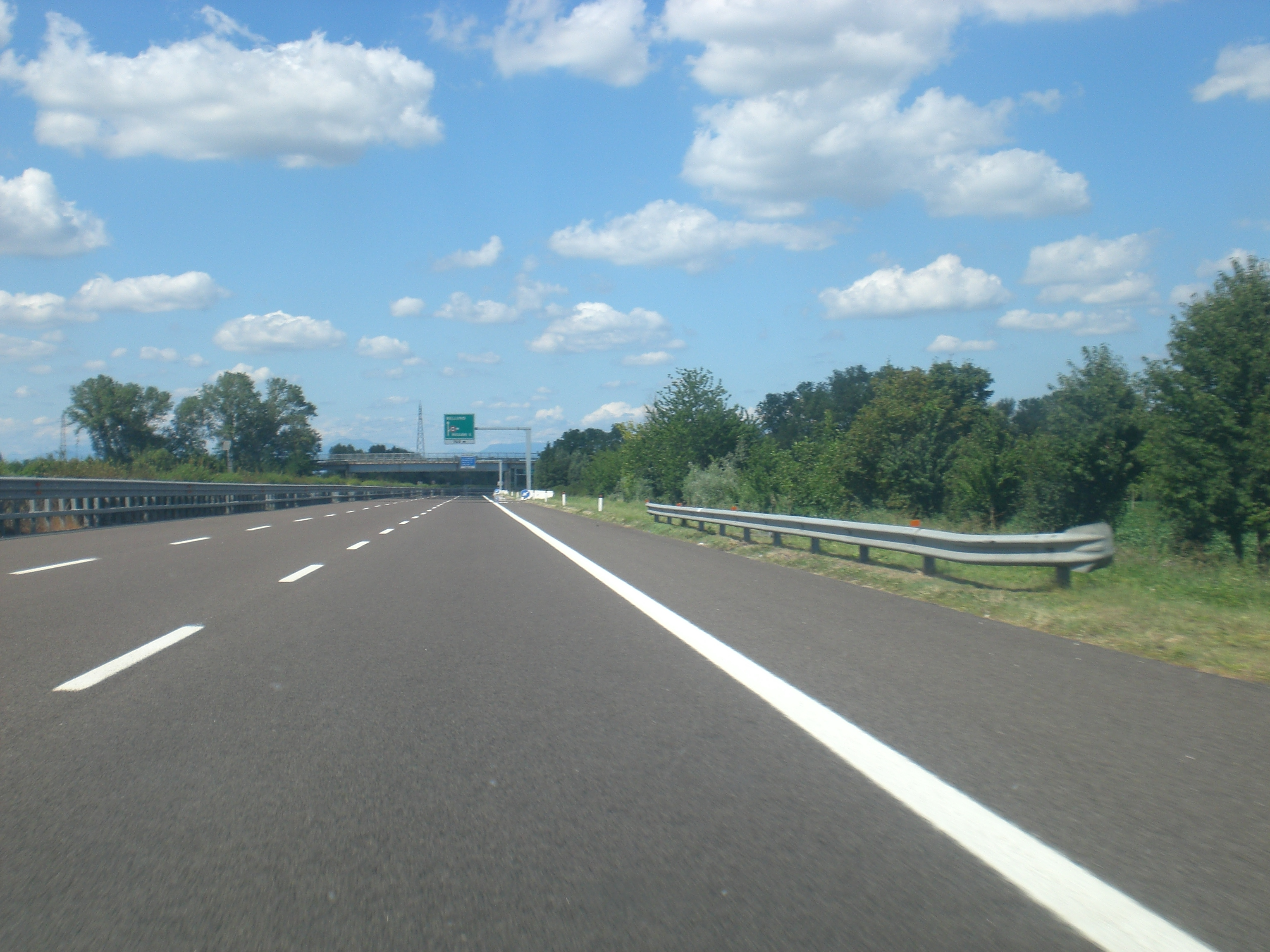
Autostrada A27 near Mogliano Veneto direction Belluno

=== Motorways ===
- Autostrada A27: Venice-Pian di Vedoia

=== Railway lines ===
- Calalzo–Padua railway

=== Airports ===
- Belluno Airport
- Cortina Airport

== See also ==
- Lake Auronzo
