= Ospitale di Cadore =

- Comune
- Comune di Ospitale di Cadore
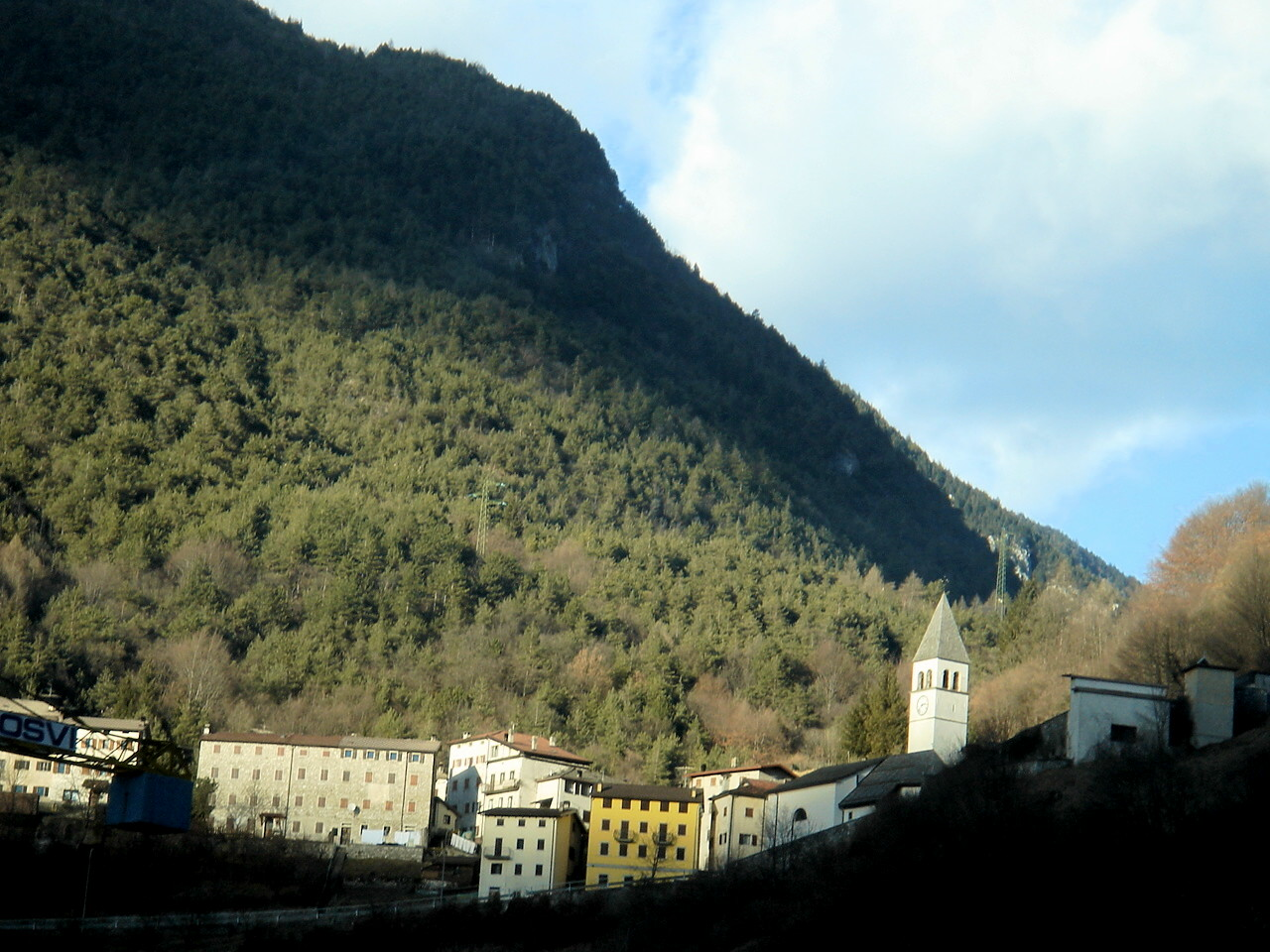
- Ospitale di Cadore

- Location within Italy Location within Veneto
- Coordinates: 46°20′N 12°19′E
- Country: Italy
- Region: Veneto
- Province: Belluno (BL)

Government
  - Mayor: Livio Sacchet

Area
  - Total: 40.1 km^{2} (15.5 sq mi)

Population (Dec. 2004)
  - Total: 368
  - Density: 9.18/km^{2} (23.8/sq mi)
- Demonym: Ospitalesi
- Time zone: UTC+1 (CET)
  - Summer (DST): UTC+2 (CEST)
- Postal code: 32010
- Dialing code: 0437

Ospitale di Cadore (Ladin: Ospedal) is a comune (municipality) in the province of Belluno in the Italian region of Veneto, located about 100 kilometres (62 mi) north of Venice and about 25 kilometres (16 mi) northeast of Belluno.
