= Zoppè di Cadore =

- Comune
- Comune di Zoppè di Cadore
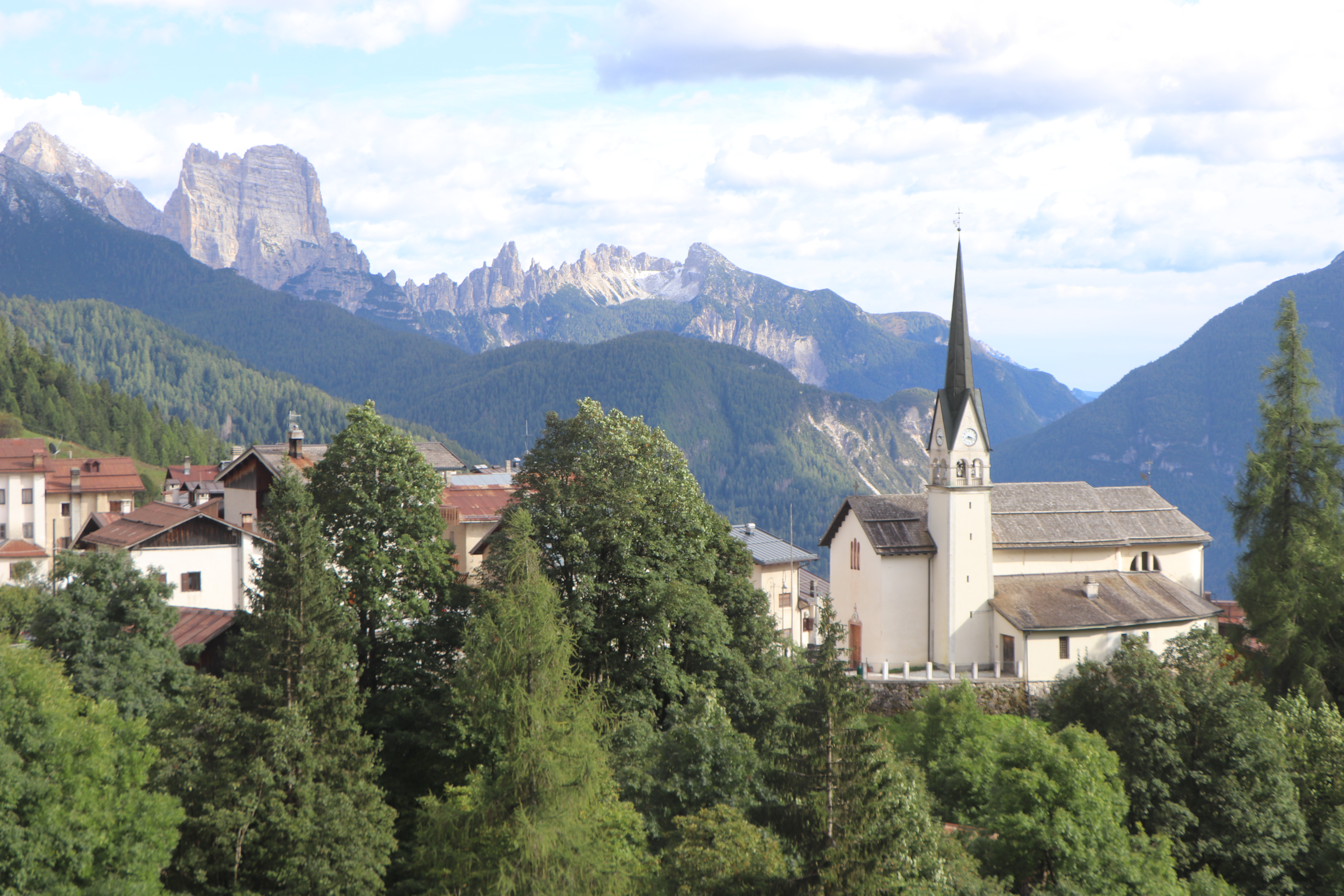

- Location within Italy Location within Veneto
- Coordinates: 46°23′N 12°11′E
- Country: Italy
- Region: Veneto
- Province: Belluno (BL)
- Frazioni: Bortolot, Sagui, Villa

Government
  - Mayor: Renzo Bortolot

Area
  - Total: 4.4 km^{2} (1.7 sq mi)
- Elevation: 1,461 m (4,793 ft)

Population (Dec. 2004)
  - Total: 292
  - Density: 66/km^{2} (170/sq mi)
- Demonym: Zopparini or Zoppedini
- Time zone: UTC+1 (CET)
  - Summer (DST): UTC+2 (CEST)
- Postal code: 32010
- Dialing code: 0437
- Patron saint: St. Anne
- Saint day: July 26

Zoppè di Cadore is a comune (municipality) in the province of Belluno in the Italian region of Veneto. It is located about 110 kilometres (68 mi) north of Venice and about 30 kilometres (19 mi) north of Belluno.
