= Danta di Cadore =

- Comune
- Comune di Danta di Cadore
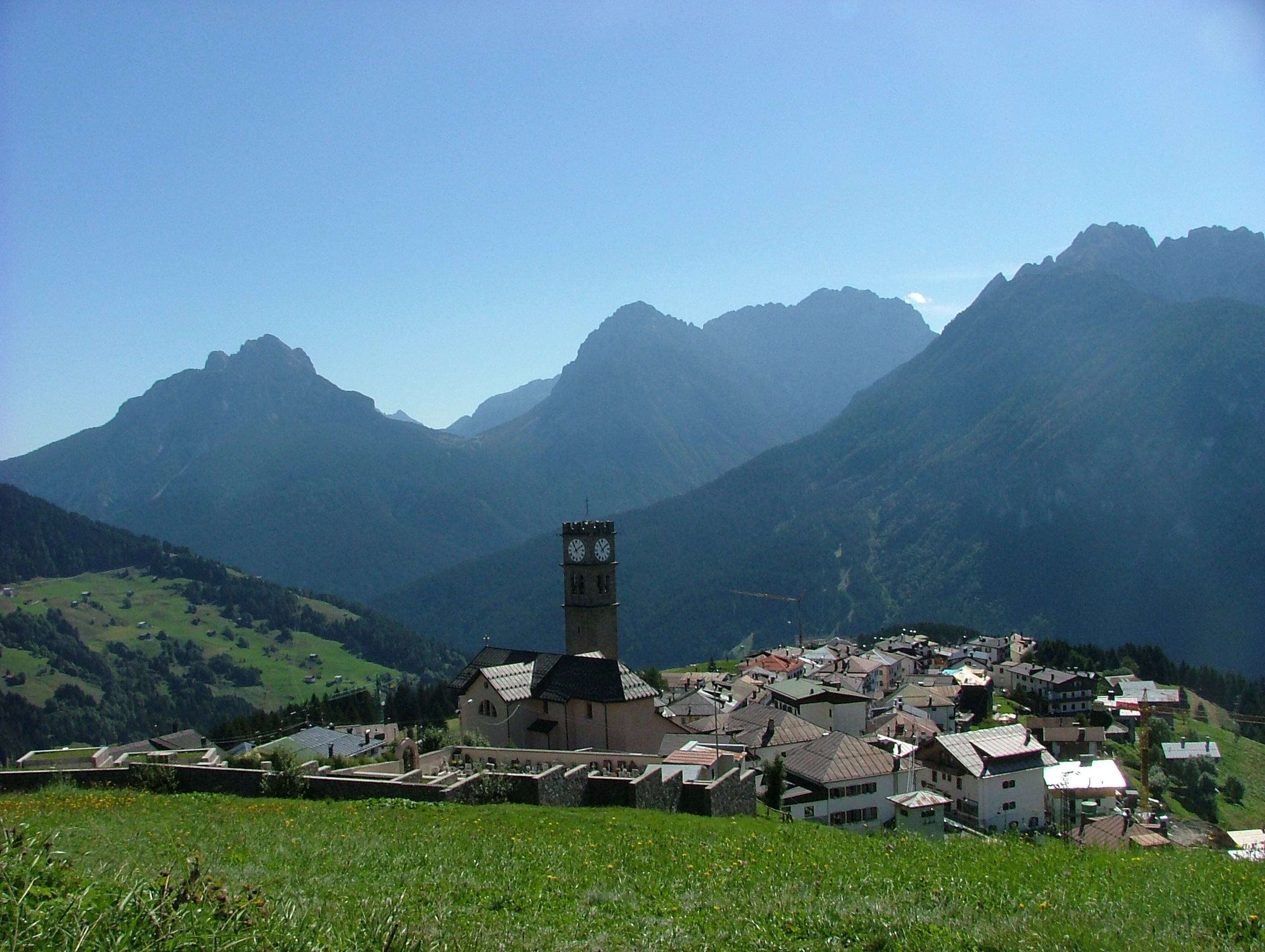

- Location within Italy Location within Veneto
- Coordinates: 46°34′N 12°31′E
- Country: Italy
- Region: Veneto
- Province: Belluno (BL)

Government
  - Mayor: Ivano Mattea

Area
  - Total: 8.0 km^{2} (3.1 sq mi)
- Elevation: 1,398 m (4,587 ft)

Population (30 June 2017)
  - Total: 446
  - Density: 56/km^{2} (140/sq mi)
- Demonym: Dantini
- Time zone: UTC+1 (CET)
  - Summer (DST): UTC+2 (CEST)
- Postal code: 32040
- Dialing code: 0435
- Website: Official website

Danta di Cadore is a comune (municipality) in the province of Belluno in the Italian region of Veneto, located about 130 kilometres (81 mi) north of Venice and about 50 kilometres (31 mi) northeast of Belluno.

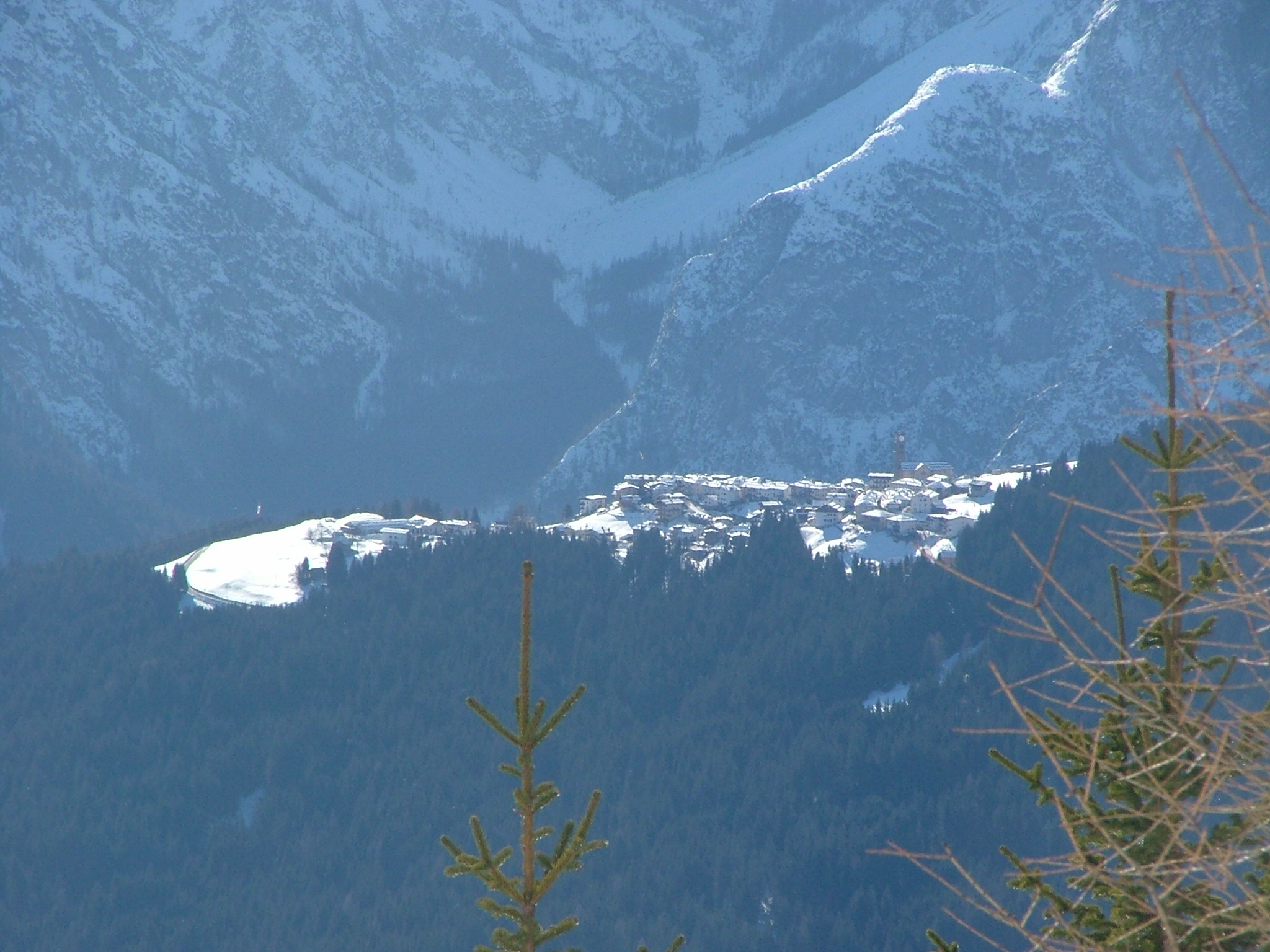
Danta di Cadore
