= List of municipalities of the Province of Belluno =

The following is a list of the 60 municipalities (comuni) of the Province of Belluno in the region of Veneto in Italy.

== List ==
Municipality	Population (2026)	Area (km²)	Density
Agordo	4,062	23.74	171.1
Alleghe	1,064	29.72	35.8
Alpago	6,579	80.34	81.9
Arsiè	2,174	64.76	33.6
Auronzo di Cadore	2,982	220.65	13.5
Belluno	35,499	147.22	241.1
Borca di Cadore	790	26.76	29.5
Borgo Valbelluna	13,620	167.69	81.2
Calalzo di Cadore	1,799	43.51	41.3
Canale d'Agordo	1,045	45.96	22.7
Cencenighe Agordino	1,202	18.13	66.3
Cesiomaggiore	3,954	82.10	48.2
Chies d'Alpago	1,244	44.97	27.7
Cibiana di Cadore	323	21.59	15.0
Colle Santa Lucia	339	15.34	22.1
Comelico Superiore	2,050	96.15	21.3
Cortina d'Ampezzo	5,399	252.81	21.4
Danta di Cadore	421	7.95	53.0
Domegge di Cadore	2,235	50.36	44.4
Falcade	1,734	52.80	32.8
Feltre	20,600	99.79	206.4
Fonzaso	2,966	27.62	107.4
Gosaldo	511	48.48	10.5
La Valle Agordina	1,040	48.67	21.4
Lamon	2,576	54.36	47.4
Limana	5,455	39.12	139.4
Livinallongo del Col di Lana	1,218	100.01	12.2
Longarone	4,982	122.36	40.7
Lorenzago di Cadore	527	27.35	19.3
Lozzo di Cadore	1,212	30.40	39.9
Ospitale di Cadore	259	39.78	6.5
Pedavena	4,321	25.06	172.4
Perarolo di Cadore	359	43.94	8.2
Pieve di Cadore	3,588	67.17	53.4
Ponte nelle Alpi	7,903	58.14	135.9
Rivamonte Agordino	592	23.30	25.4
Rocca Pietore	1,119	73.29	15.3
San Gregorio nelle Alpi	1,582	19.12	82.7
San Nicolò di Comelico	368	24.16	15.2
San Pietro di Cadore	1,412	52.13	27.1
San Tomaso Agordino	593	19.18	30.9
San Vito di Cadore	1,925	61.62	31.2
Santa Giustina	6,621	35.92	184.3
Santo Stefano di Cadore	2,276	100.62	22.6
Sedico	10,134	91.20	111.1
Selva di Cadore	504	33.33	15.1
Seren del Grappa	2,323	62.53	37.2
Setteville	5,952	82.43	72.2
Sospirolo	3,130	65.86	47.5
Soverzene	362	14.79	24.5
Sovramonte	1,287	50.55	25.5
Taibon Agordino	1,710	90.06	19.0
Tambre	1,261	45.27	27.9
Val di Zoldo	2,708	141.65	19.1
Vallada Agordina	458	13.00	35.2
Valle di Cadore	1,812	40.64	44.6
Vigo di Cadore	1,322	70.07	18.9
Vodo Cadore	822	46.88	17.5
Voltago Agordino	785	23.47	33.4
Zoppè di Cadore	175	4.33	40.4

== See also ==
- List of municipalities of Veneto
- List of municipalities of Italy
