= Villa degli Azzoni Avogadro (Bivai) =

Coordinates: 46°04′16″N 12°00′24″E

- Bivai
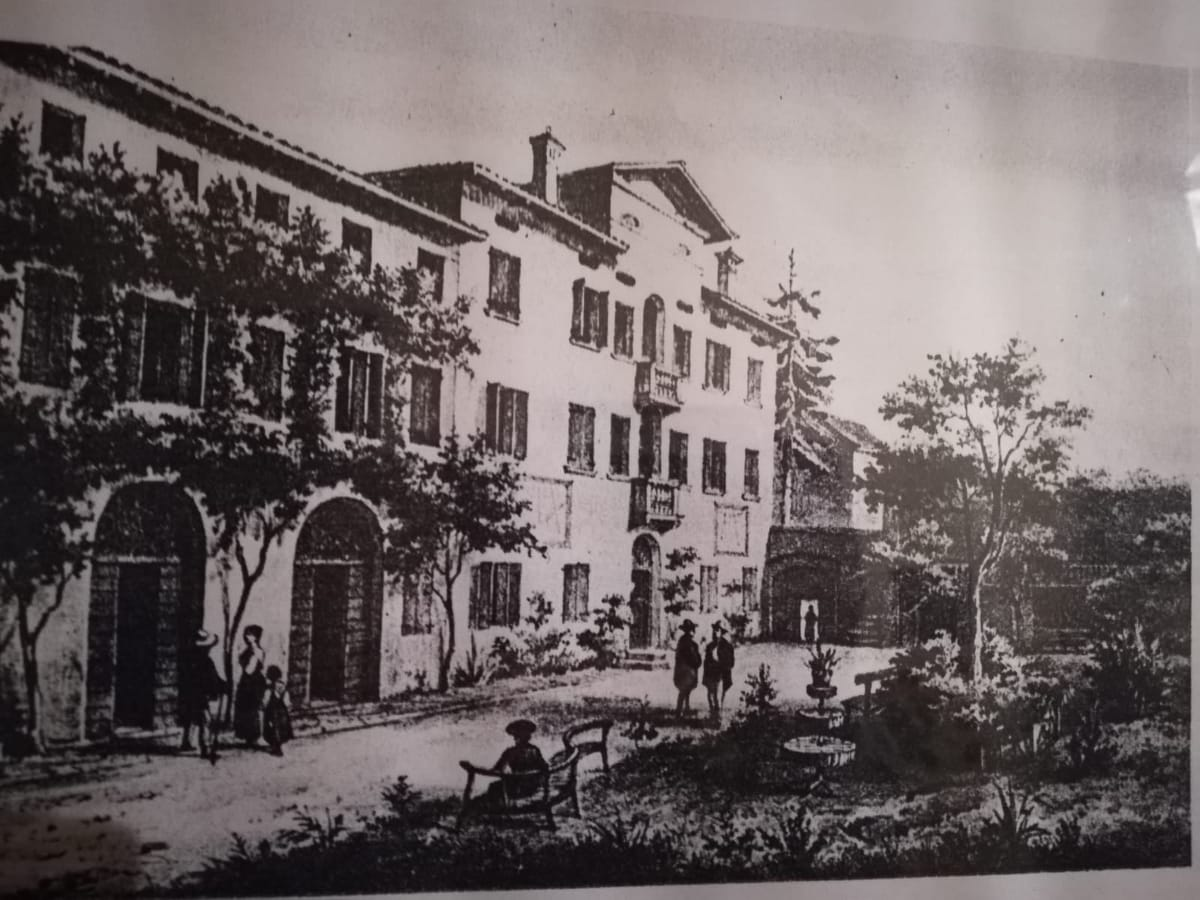
- Interactive map of the Villa degli Azzoni Avogadro area

General information
- Type: Venetian Villa
- Location: Santa Giustina, Belluno, Veneto, Italy
- Construction started: 1600
- Owner: Count Jacopo degli Azzoni Avogadro

Website
- http://www.bivai.it/

Villa degli Azzoni Avogadro is a Venetian Villa located in the Comune of Santa Giustina in the province of Belluno. It was built on the ruins of an ancient Castle called Bivai close to the Alps Dolomites located in northeastern Italy.

== History ==
The ancient castle was called Bivai from the Italian word Bivio (the fork) due to its structure. Since 407 AD the castle of Bivai belonged to the Teuponi family, descendants of Teupo, captain of the Goths. The Teuponi were part of the Guelph fraction and considered to be excellent warriors like Pietro Teupone who took part in the First Crusade and Giorgio Teupone who was nominated captain by Ezzelino da romano. They were also generous benefactors like the Knight Giovanni Teupone, last member of this family, who donated part of his wealth to the Church of S. Vittore and to the Cathedral of St. Peter located in Feltre. During the 17th century the Venetian Villa was built and in the 19th century Count Carlo Azzoni Avogadro, after being nominated Mayor of Santa Giustina, commissioned the last changes and alterations still present today.

== Architecture ==
The symmetry of the 17th-century structure has been modified by adding a lower body during the 19th century. A small cottage borders the garden defining the margins of the property and it is connected to the main body through an arched portal which is used as one of the entrances to the Villa. The floor of Villa degli Azzoni Avogadro is made out of wood while in the recently restored apartments, the material is ceramic.

== Today ==
Count Jacopo degli Azzoni Avogadro, descendant of the family and owner of the Villa, is re-launching the structure by turning the old barn into tourist apartments and a restaurant. He also planted five hectares of vines and in collaboration with the company Tesla, he installed connector chargers for electric cars respecting Environmental Sustainability. Villa degli Azzoni Avogadro recently hosted some art events like a concert by Italian singer Giorgio Conte, brother of Paolo Conte, and it has also been a movie set for the feature film Affitasi Vita directed by Italian director Stefano Usardi. In 2009 Count Jacopo degli Azzoni Avogadro bought Haubach Palast in Berlin originally designed by English architect Ernest George and turned its apartments into Haubach Residence.

== Gallery ==
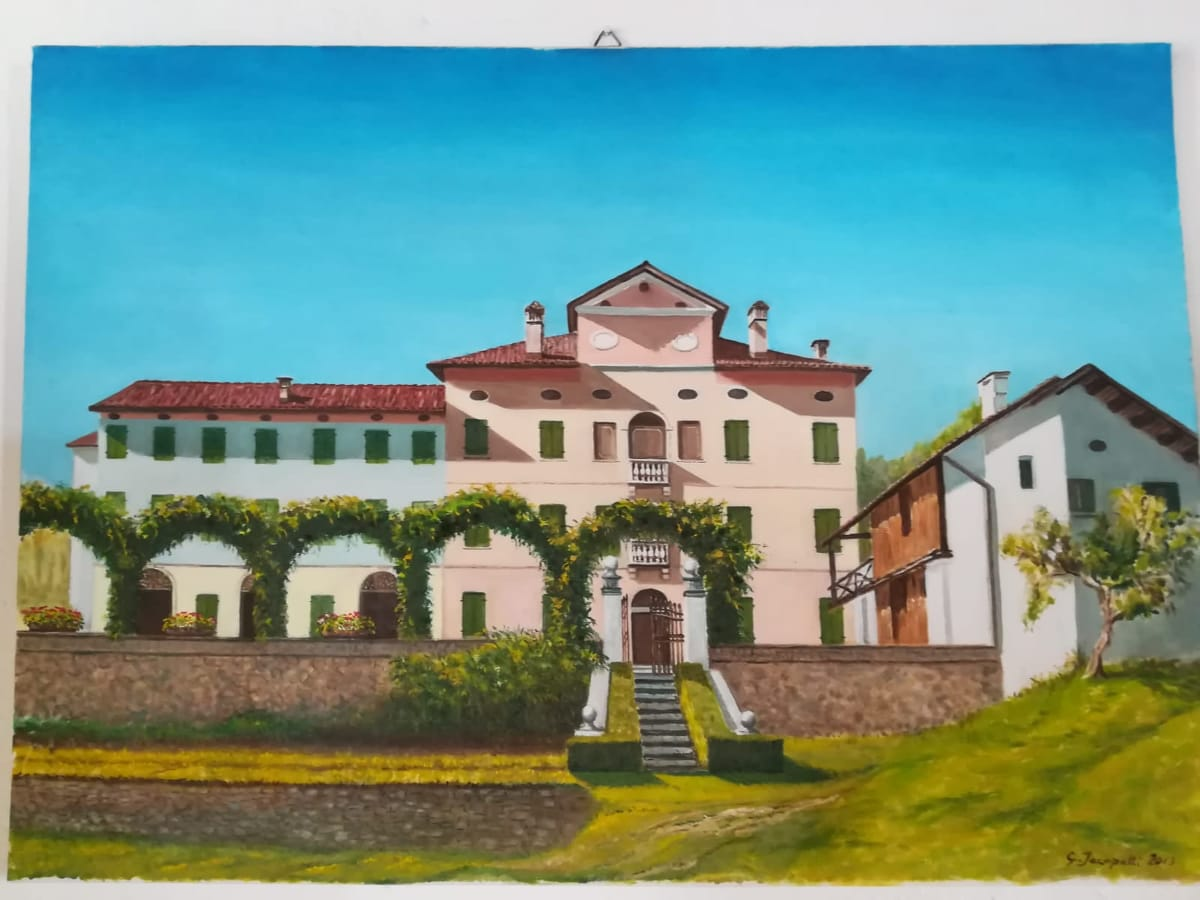
Drawing of the Villa

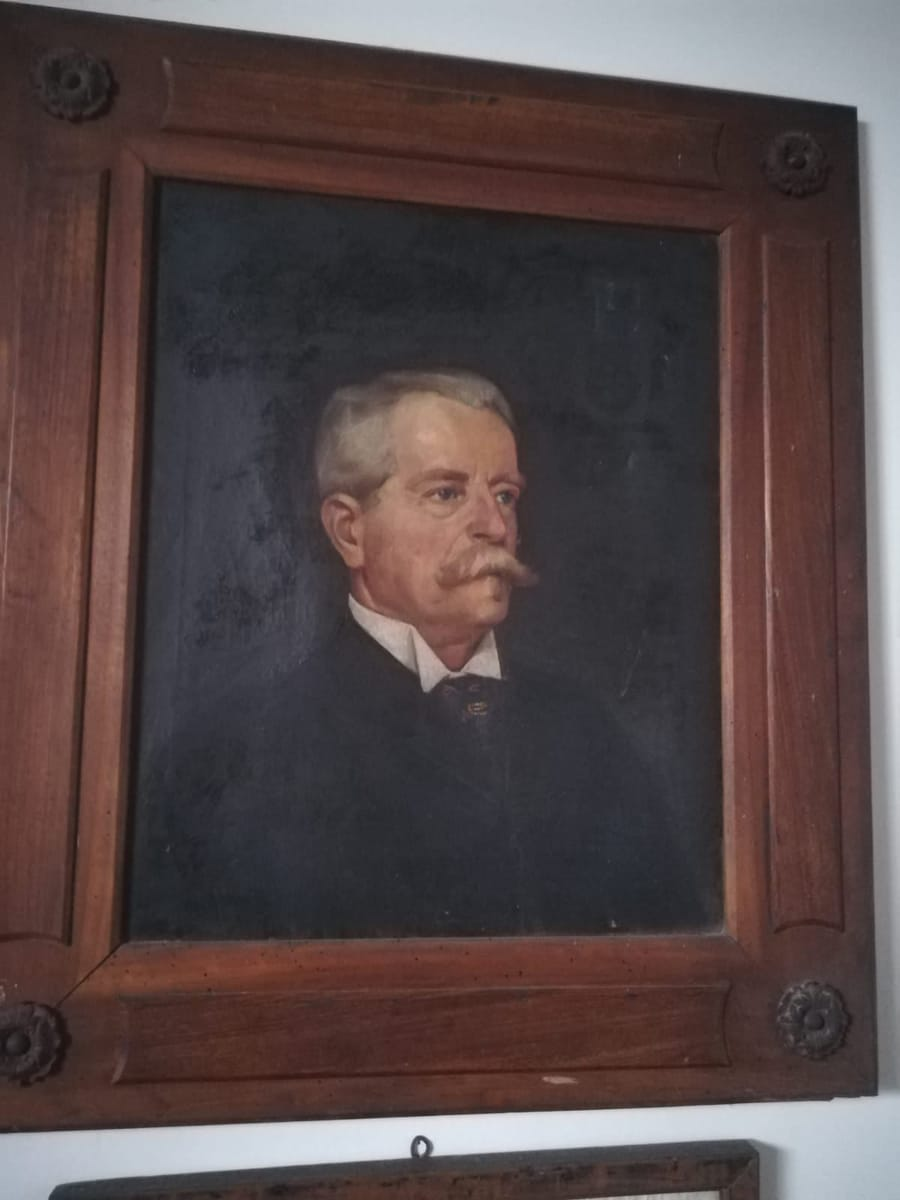
Count Rizzolino degli Azzoni Avogadro

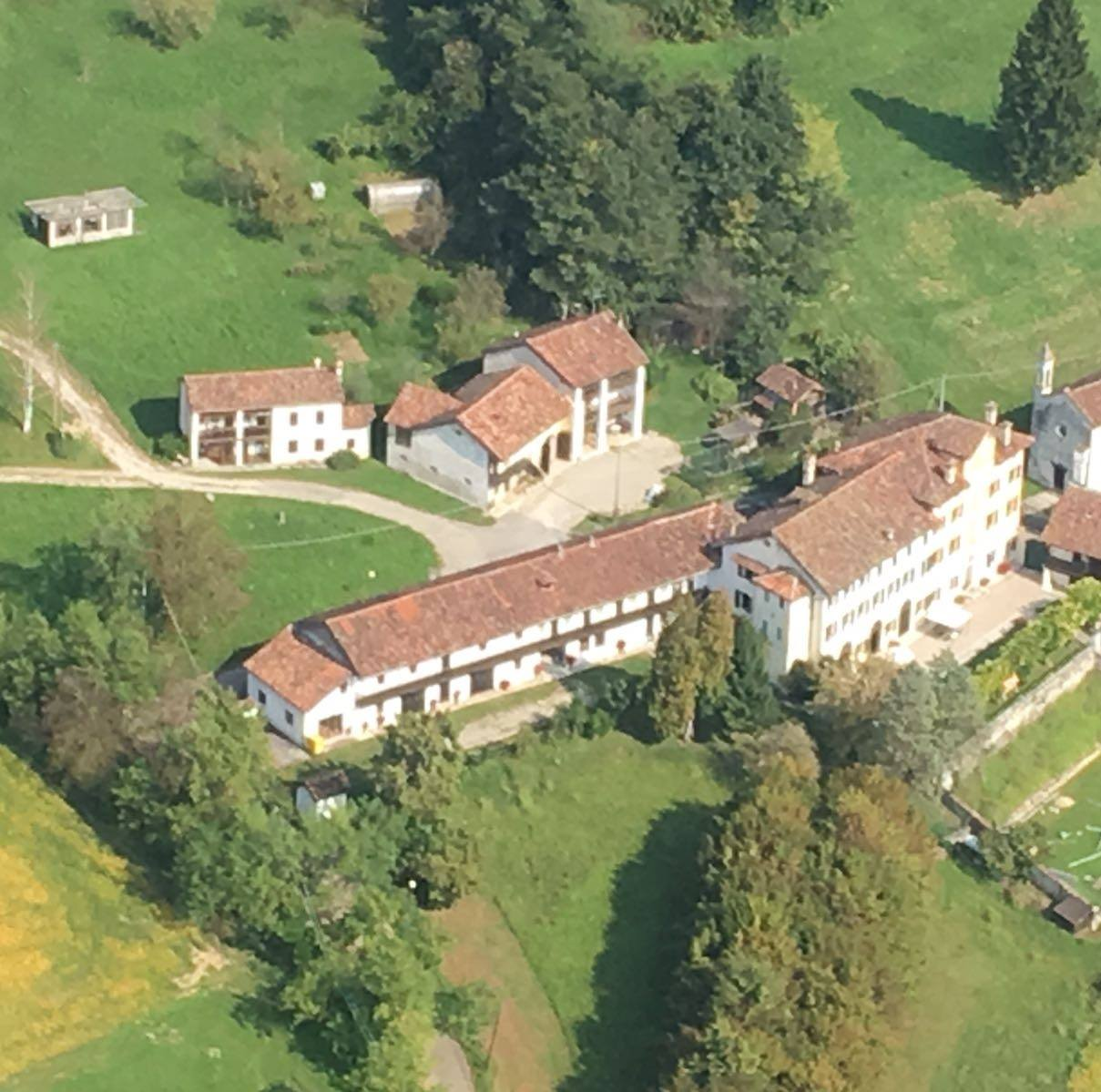
Aerial view of the property

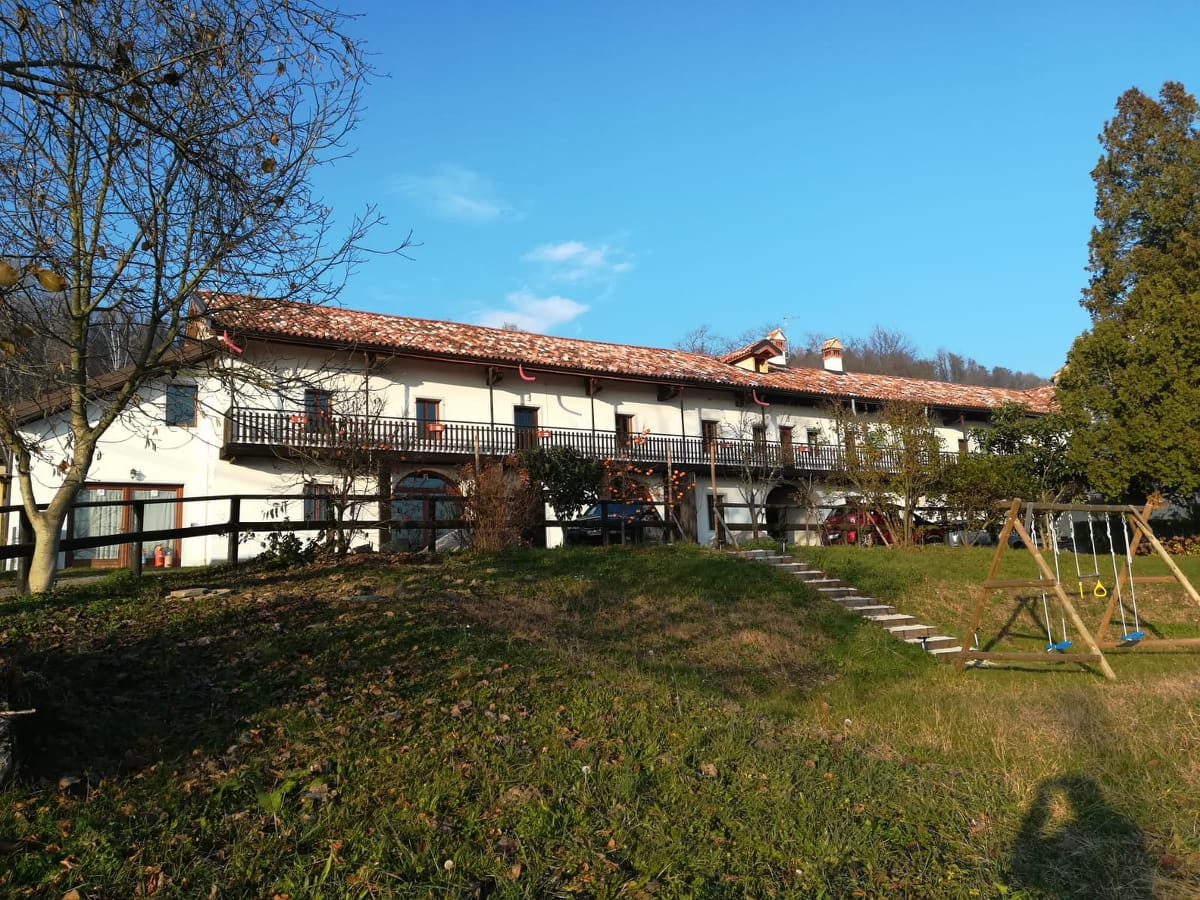
Granary of the Villa

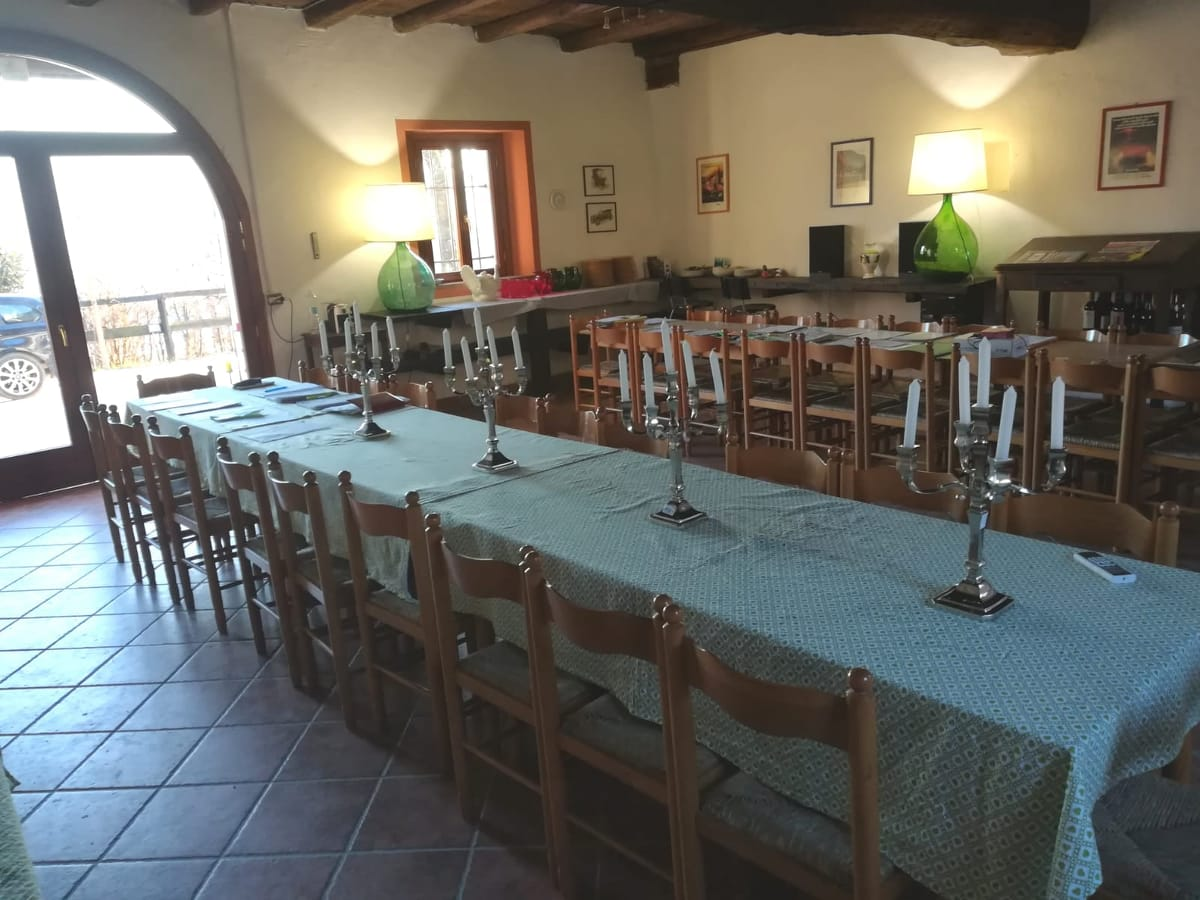
Interior of the granary

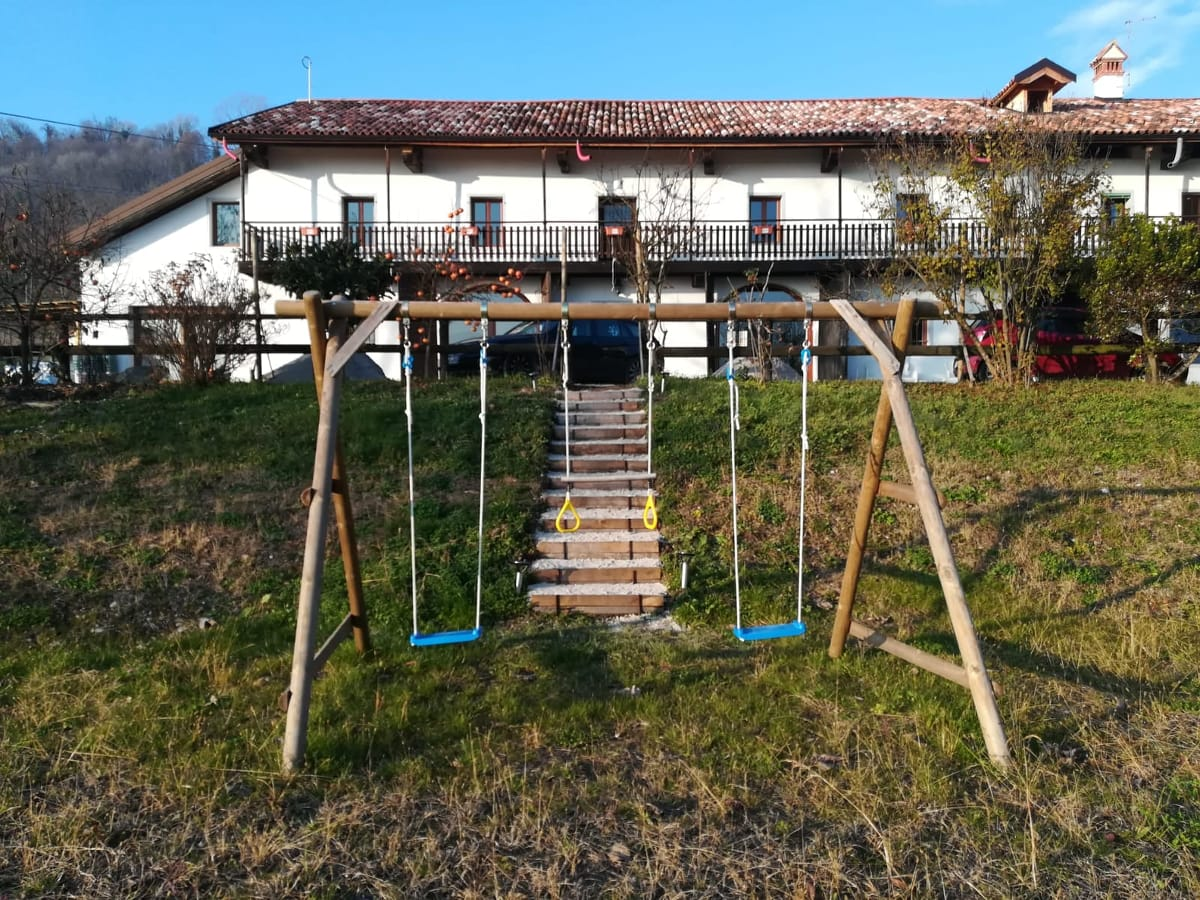
Swing in the garden

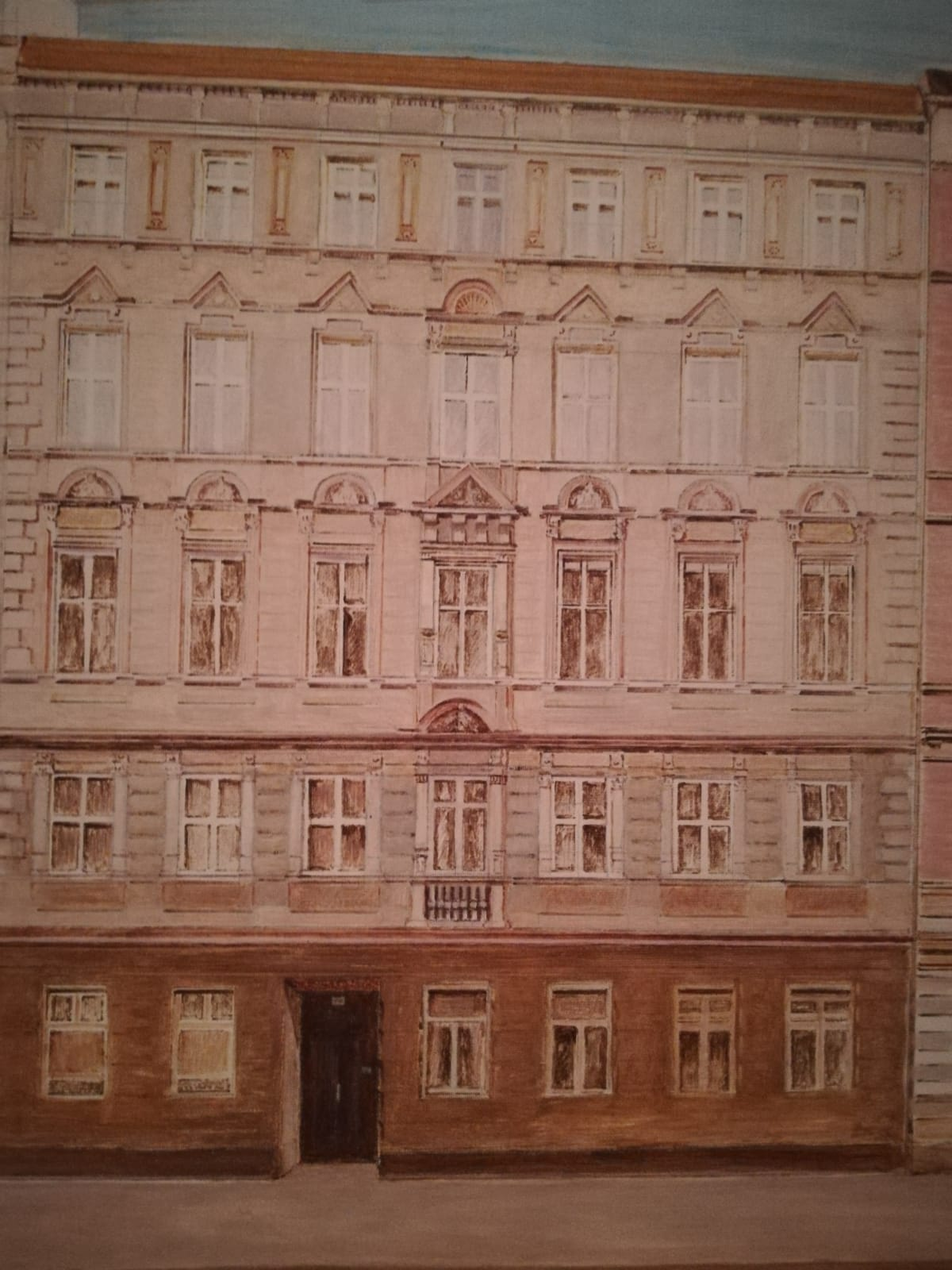
Haubach Palast
