= La Valle Agordina =

- Comune
- Comune di La Valle Agordina
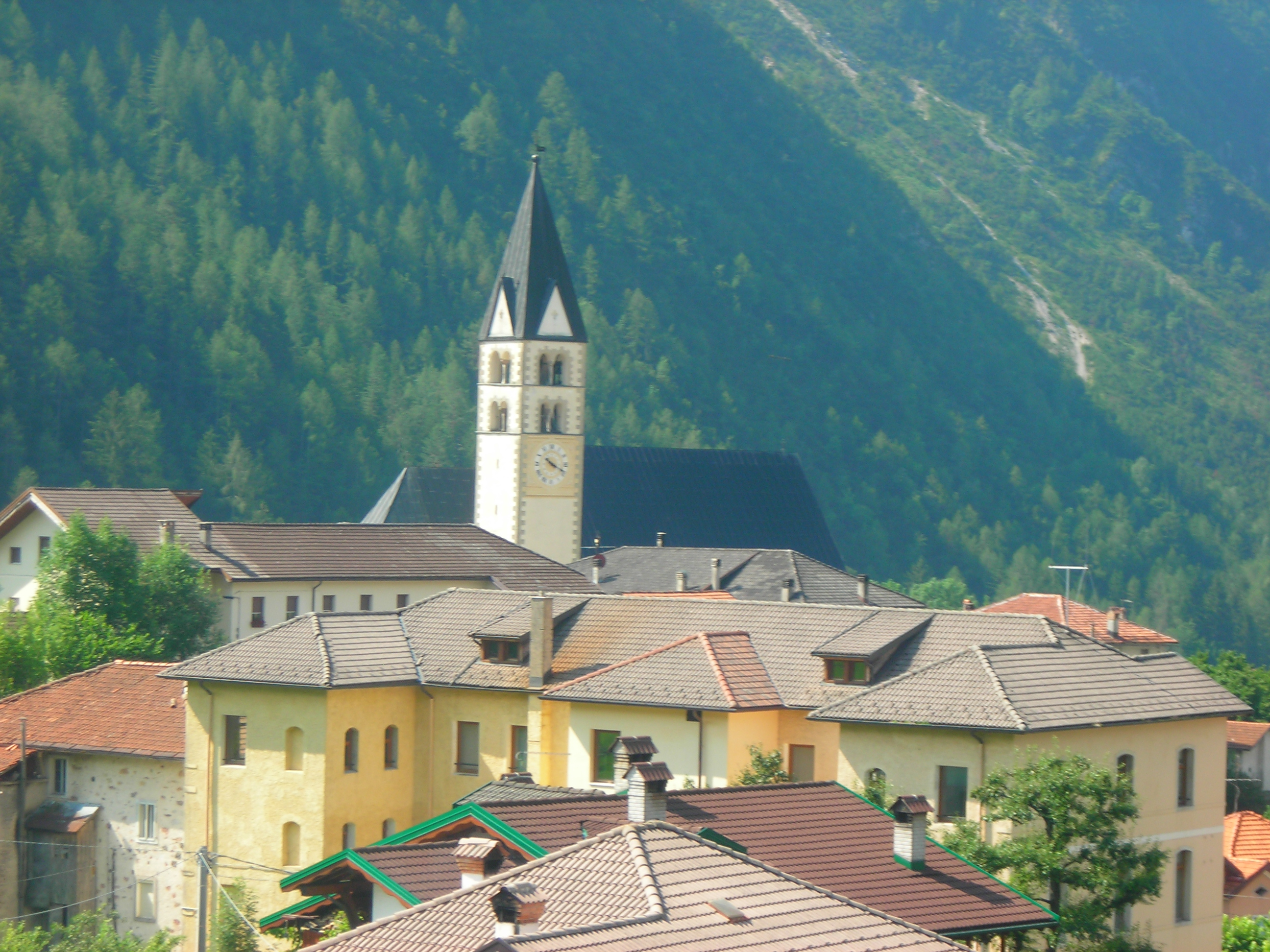

- Location within Italy Location within Veneto
- Coordinates: 46°16′N 12°4′E
- Country: Italy
- Region: Veneto
- Province: Province of Belluno (BL)
- Frazioni: Cugnago, Fadés, Lantrago, Matten, Conaggia, Chiesa, Torsas, Gaidòn, Ronche, Ronchet, Cancellade, Noàch, Le Campe, La Muda

Area
  - Total: 48.7 km^{2} (18.8 sq mi)

Population (Dec. 2004)
  - Total: 1,217
  - Density: 25.0/km^{2} (64.7/sq mi)
- Demonym: Lavallesi
- Time zone: UTC+1 (CET)
  - Summer (DST): UTC+2 (CEST)
- Postal code: 32020
- Dialing code: 0437

La Valle Agordina is a comune (municipality) in the Province of Belluno in the Italian region Veneto, located about 90 kilometres (56 mi) north of Venice and about 20 kilometres (12 mi) northwest of Belluno. As of 31 December 2004, it had a population of 1,217 and an area of 48.7 square kilometres (18.8 mi^{2}).

The municipality of La Valle Agordina contains the frazioni (subdivisions, mainly villages and hamlets) Cugnago, Fadés, Lantrago, Matten, Conaggia, Chiesa, Torsas, Gaidòn, Ronche, Ronchet, Cancellade, Noàch, Le Campe, and La Muda.

La Valle Agordina borders the following municipalities: Agordo, Forno di Zoldo, Longarone, Rivamonte Agordino, Sedico, Zoldo Alto.

== Territory ==
La Valle has a lot of mountains around itself and inside its municipality: Zelo (south), Talvena (east), the chain of San Sebastiano (northeast), a little piece of Moiazza.

From the village, other mountains are also visible outside of the municipality: Framont (northwest, Agordo), Agner (west, Agordo), Pale di San Lucano (west-northwest, Taibon Agordino), Monti del Sole (like Sun mountains, southwest, Gosaldo), Imperina (south-southwest, Rivamonte Agordino).

In La Valle's municipality there are a lot of little rivers, like Rova, Missiaga, Bordina and Val Clusa.

== Demographic evolution ==
Historical population

Year	Pop.	±%
1861	?	—
1871	2,013	—
1881	2,007	−0.3%
1901	2,160	+7.6%
1911	2,301	+6.5%

Year	Pop.	±%
1921	2,260	−1.8%
1931	2,020	−10.6%
1936	1,593	−21.1%
1951	1,783	+11.9%
1961	1,628	−8.7%

Year	Pop.	±%
1971	1,263	−22.4%
1981	1,321	+4.6%
1991	1,197	−9.4%
2001	1,208	+0.9%

Source: Data from ISTAT
