= San Gregorio nelle Alpi =

- Comune
- Comune di San Gregorio nelle Alpi
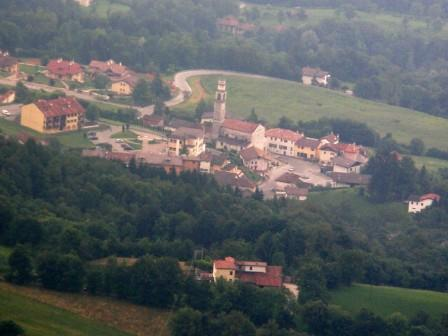

- Coat of arms

- Location within Italy Location within Veneto
- Coordinates: 46°6′N 12°2′E
- Country: Italy
- Region: Veneto
- Province: Belluno (BL)
- Frazioni: Velos, Muiach, Roncoi, Donce, Paderno, Alconis, Tassin, Gasnil, Cargnach, Paluch, Cort, Saltoi, Barp, Caval, Paluch, Fumach, Carazzai, Maserolle

Government
  - Mayor: Ermes Vieceli

Area
  - Total: 18.9 km^{2} (7.3 sq mi)
- Elevation: 526 m (1,726 ft)

Population (2006)
  - Total: 1,578
  - Density: 83.5/km^{2} (216/sq mi)
- Demonym: Sangregoriesi
- Time zone: UTC+1 (CET)
  - Summer (DST): UTC+2 (CEST)
- Postal code: 32030
- Dialing code: 0437

San Gregorio nelle Alpi (Veneto: San Regorio) is a comune (municipality) in the province of Belluno, in the Italian region of Veneto, located about 80 kilometres (50 mi) northwest of Venice and about 15 kilometres (9 mi) west of Belluno.

San Gregorio nelle Alpi borders the following municipalities: Cesiomaggiore, Santa Giustina, Sospirolo.
