= Giardino Alpino "Antonio Segni" =

Botanical garden in Italy

Coordinates: 46°23′N 12°03′E

The Giardino Alpino "Antonio Segni" (5,000 m^{2}) is an alpine botanical garden located at 1,714 meters altitude in Refugio Vazzoler, Gruppo del Civetta, Col Negro di Pelsa, Taibon Agordino, Province of Belluno, Veneto, Italy. It is privately owned with a municipal affiliation, and open daily when Refugio Vazzoler is open.

The garden was established in 1968 in the Dolomites, and named after Italian President Antonio Segni (1891-1972). Its mission is to educate hikers and the general public about the most important species of trees, shrubs, and grasses of the Alps and Dolomites, particularly those of the garden's local environment near the Massif Moiazza-Civetta.

The garden consists of natural areas, man-made wetlands, and three small rock gardens. Its collections include Epilobium angustifolium, Larix decidua, Picea abies, and other alpine vegetation.

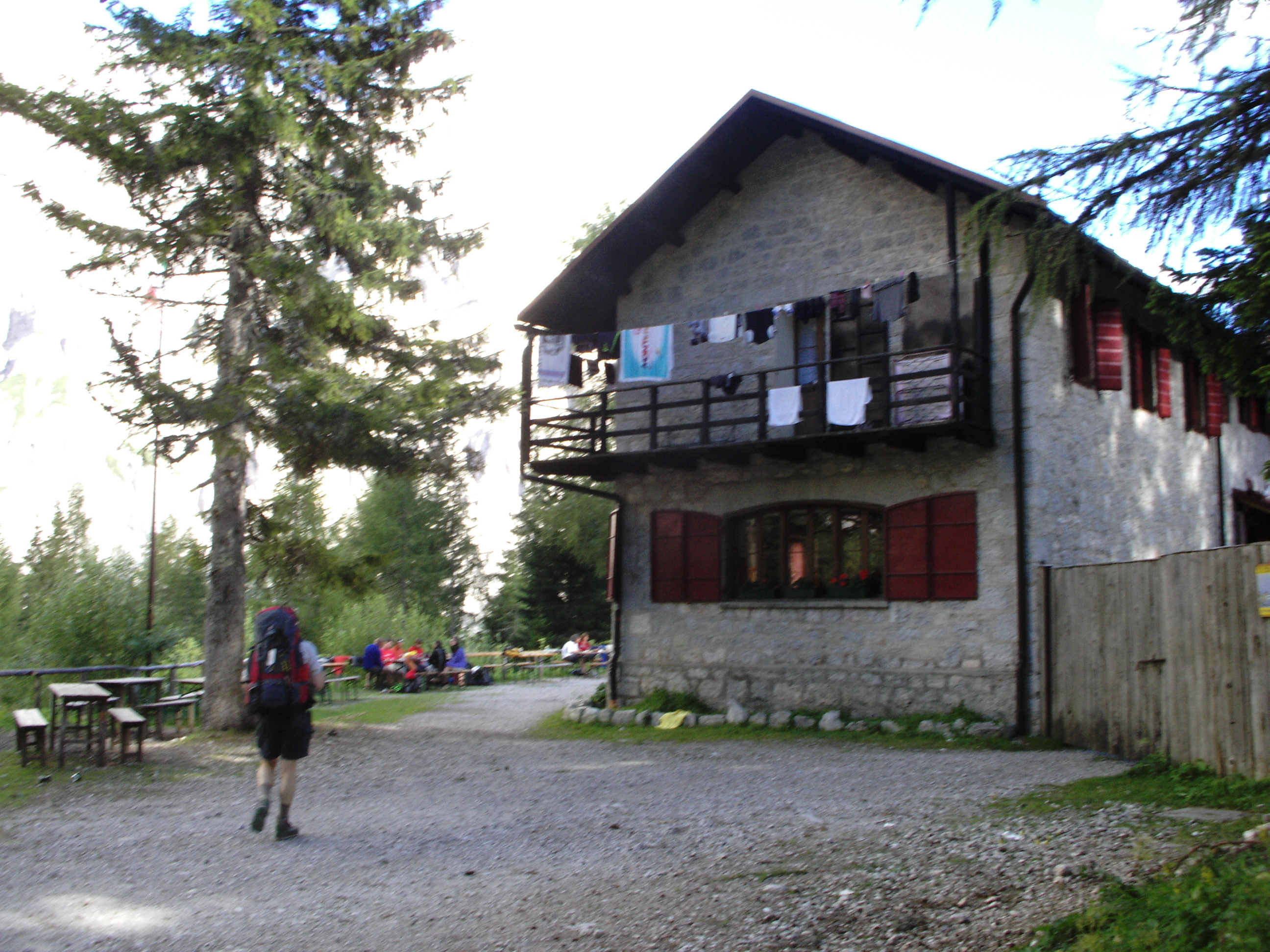
Giardino Alpino "Antonio Segni"

== See also ==
- List of botanical gardens in Italy
