= Massaranduba, Santa Catarina =

Massaranduba
- Municipality
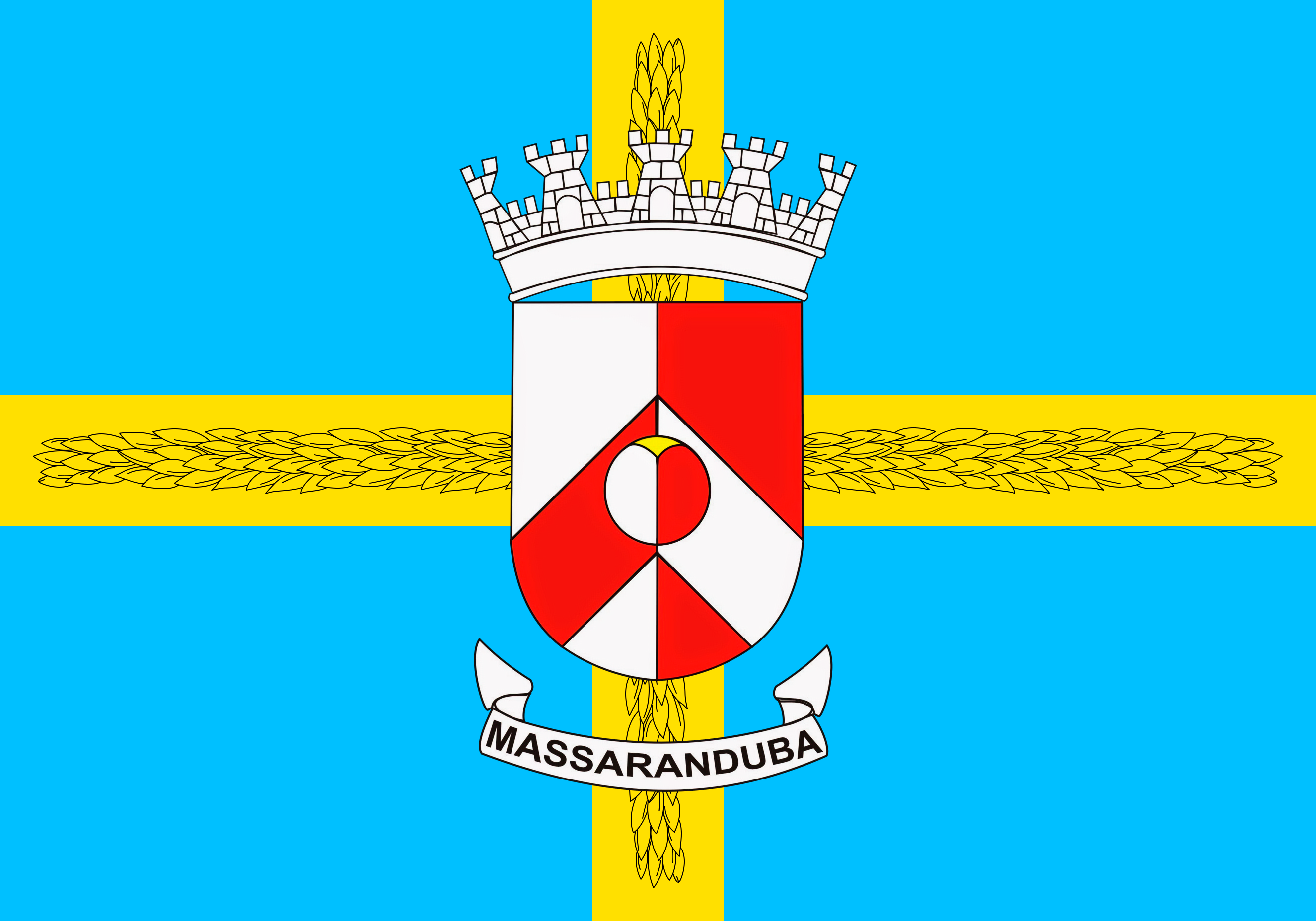
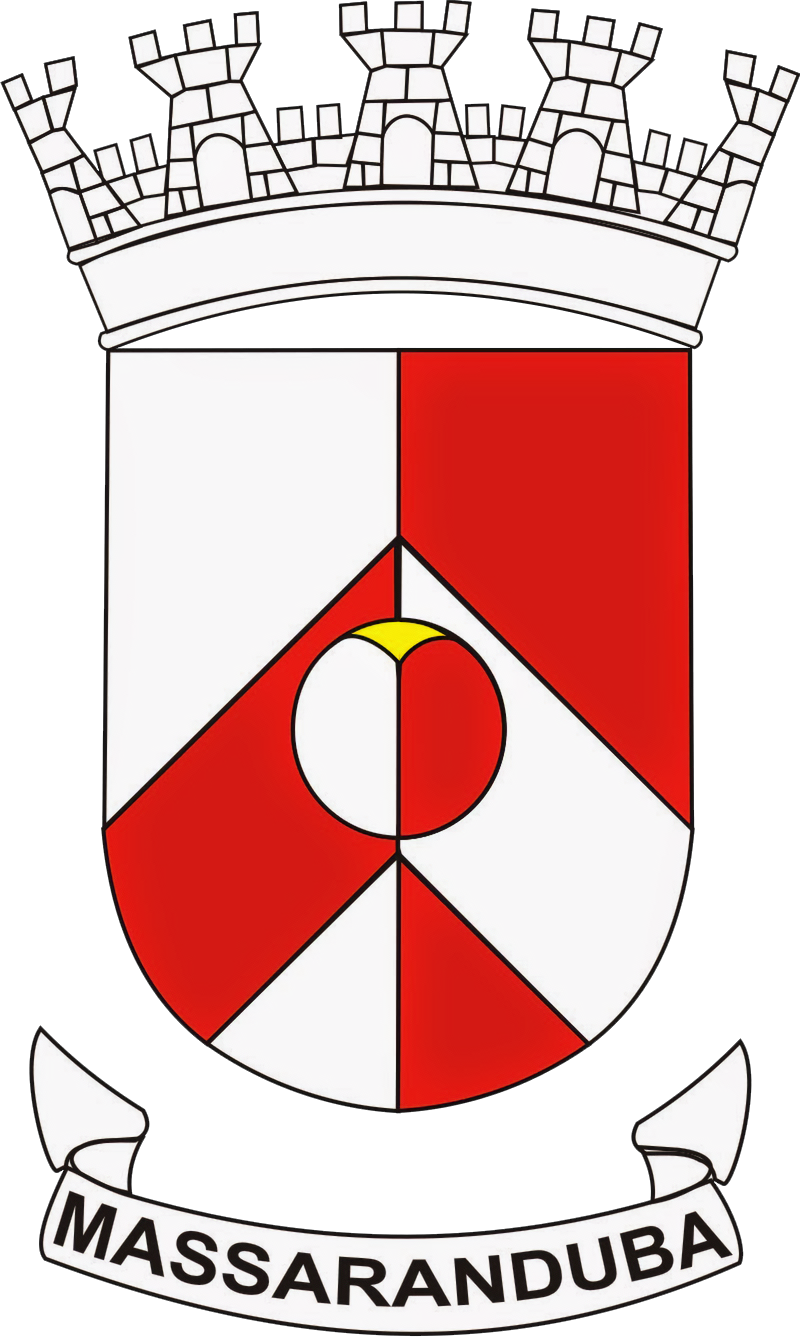
- Flag Coat of arms

- Location in Santa Catarina
- Coordinates: 26°36′39″S 49°0′28″W
- Country: Brazil
- Region: South
- State: Santa Catarina
- Mesoregion: Norte Catarinense

Area
  - Total: 144.130 sq mi (373.296 km^{2})

Population (2020)
  - Total: 17,125
- Time zone: UTC -3
- Website: www.massaranduba.sc.gov.br

Massaranduba is a municipality in the state of Santa Catarina in the South region of Brazil. As of 2020, the municipality has a population of 17,125.

== See also ==
- List of municipalities in Santa Catarina

== Twin towns ==
Massaranduba is twinned with:

- Canale d'Agordo in Italy (since 2011)
- Vallada Agordina in Italy (since 2011)
- San Tomaso Agordino in Italy (since 2011)
- Cencenighe Agordino in Italy (since 2011)
- Falcade in Italy (since 2011)
