= Vallada Agordina =

Vallada Agordina Valada
- Comune
- Comune di Vallada Agordina
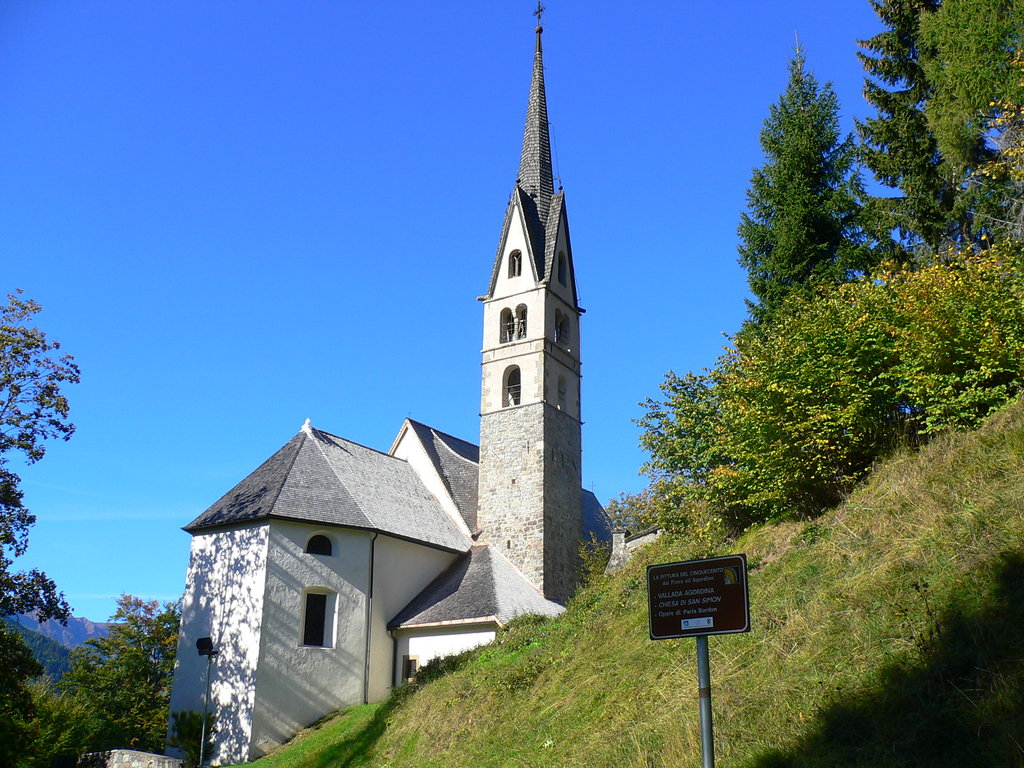

- Coat of arms

- Location within Italy Location within Veneto
- Coordinates: 46°22′N 11°56′E
- Country: Italy
- Region: Veneto
- Province: Belluno (BL)
- Frazioni: Mas, Celat (Ladin: Zelat), Sachet, Andrich, Toffol (Ladin: Tofol), Piaz, Cogul (Ladin: Chegul)

Government
  - Mayor: Fabio Ferdinando Luchetta

Area
  - Total: 13.2 km^{2} (5.1 sq mi)
- Elevation: 1,033 m (3,389 ft)

Population (31 August 2010)
  - Total: 513
  - Density: 38.9/km^{2} (101/sq mi)
- Demonym: Valladesi
- Time zone: UTC+1 (CET)
  - Summer (DST): UTC+2 (CEST)
- Postal code: 32020
- Dialing code: 0437

Vallada Agordina (Ladin: Valada) is a comune (municipality) in the Province of Belluno in the Italian region Veneto, located about 110 kilometres (68 mi) northwest of Venice and about 35 kilometres (22 mi) northwest of Belluno.

Vallada Agordina borders the following municipalities: Canale d'Agordo, Cencenighe Agordino, Rocca Pietore, San Tomaso Agordino.

The church of San Simon has a fresco cycle by Paris Bordone (1549).

== Twin towns ==
Vallada Agordina is twinned with:

- Massaranduba, Santa Catarina, Brazil, since 2011
