= Rivamonte Agordino =

- Comune
- Comune di Rivamonte Agordino
- Location within Italy Location within Veneto
- Coordinates: 46°15′N 12°1′E
- Country: Italy
- Region: Veneto
- Province: Province of Belluno (BL)

Area
  - Total: 23.2 km^{2} (9.0 sq mi)

Population (Dec. 2004)
  - Total: 664
  - Density: 28.6/km^{2} (74.1/sq mi)
- Demonym: Rivamontesi (in dialetto locale 'rivanei')
- Time zone: UTC+1 (CET)
  - Summer (DST): UTC+2 (CEST)
- Postal code: 32020
- Dialing code: 0437
- Website: Official website

Rivamonte Agordino is a comune (municipality) in the Province of Belluno in the Veneto Region of NE Italy. It is located about 90 kilometres (56 miles) north of Venice and about 20 km (12 mi) northwest of Belluno. As of 31 December 2004, it had a population of 664 and an area of 23.2 square kilometres (9.0 sq mi).

Rivamonte Agordino borders the following municipalities: Agordo, Gosaldo, La Valle Agordina, Sedico, Sospirolo and Voltago Agordino.

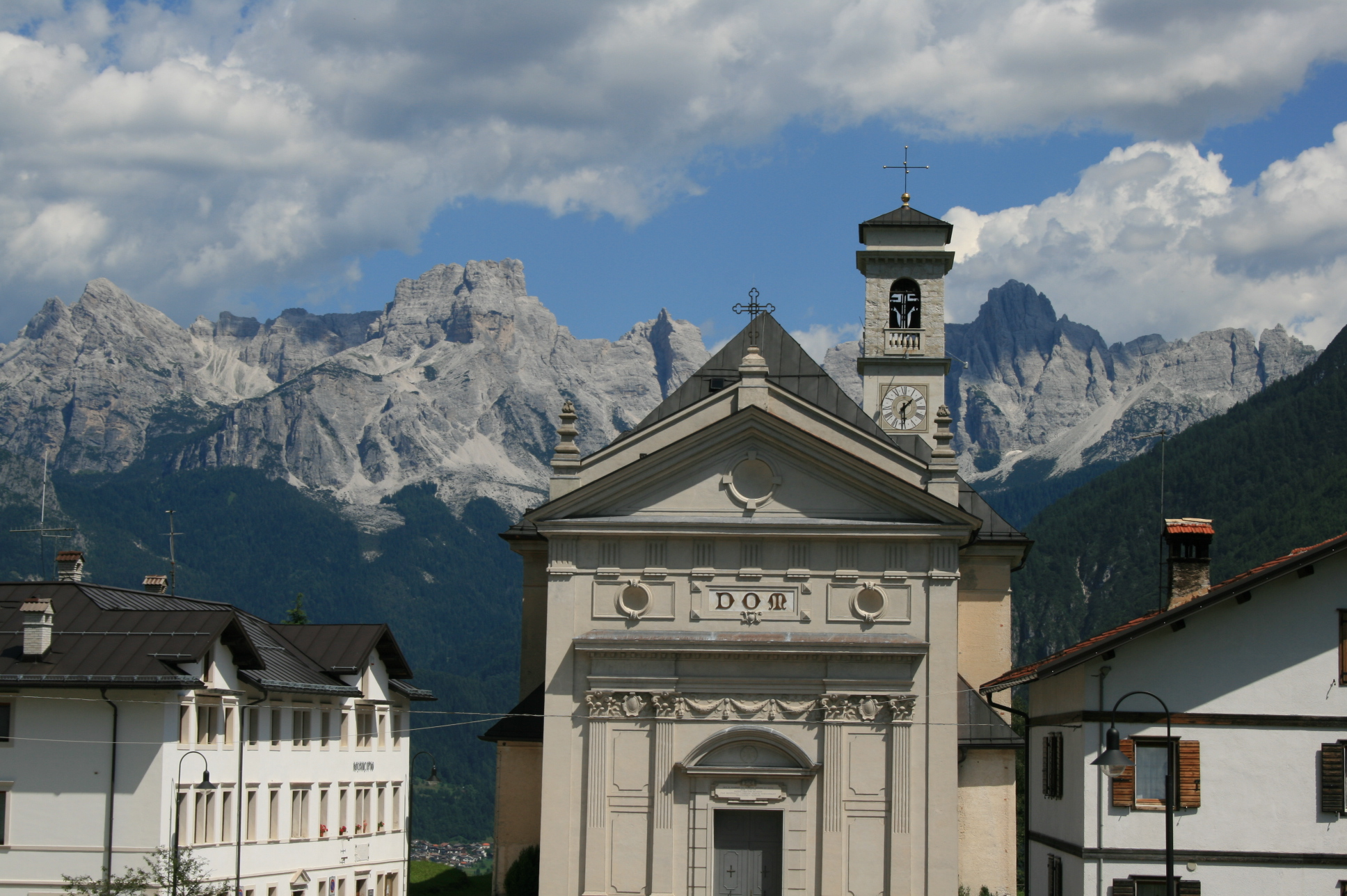
Panorama of Rivamonte Agordino

== Demographic evolution ==
Historical population

Year	Pop.	±%
1861	?	—
1871	2,217	—
1881	2,109	−4.9%
1901	2,020	−4.2%
1911	2,035	+0.7%

Year	Pop.	±%
1921	2,216	+8.9%
1931	1,946	−12.2%
1936	1,551	−20.3%
1951	1,649	+6.3%
1961	1,484	−10.0%

Year	Pop.	±%
1971	1,039	−30.0%
1981	914	−12.0%
1991	739	−19.1%
2001	688	−6.9%

Source: Data from ISTAT
