= San Tomaso Agordino =

San Tomaso Agordino San Tomas
- Comune
- Comune di San Tomaso Agordino

- Location within Italy Location within Veneto
- Coordinates: 46°23′N 11°59′E
- Country: Italy
- Region: Veneto
- Province: Province of Belluno (BL)
- Frazioni: Pecol

Area
  - Total: 19.2 km^{2} (7.4 sq mi)

Population (Dec. 2004)
  - Total: 766
  - Density: 39.9/km^{2} (103/sq mi)
- Time zone: UTC+1 (CET)
  - Summer (DST): UTC+2 (CEST)
- Postal code: 32020
- Dialing code: 0437

San Tomaso Agordino (Ladin: San Tomas) is a comune (municipality) in the Province of Belluno in the Italian region Veneto, located about 110 kilometres (68 mi) north of Venice and about 35 kilometres (22 mi) northwest of Belluno. As of 31 December 2004, it had a population of 766 and an area of 19.2 square kilometres (7.4 mi^{2}).

The municipality of San Tomaso Agordino contains the frazione (subdivision) Pecol.

San Tomaso Agordino borders the following municipalities: Alleghe, Cencenighe Agordino, Rocca Pietore, Taibon Agordino, Vallada Agordina.

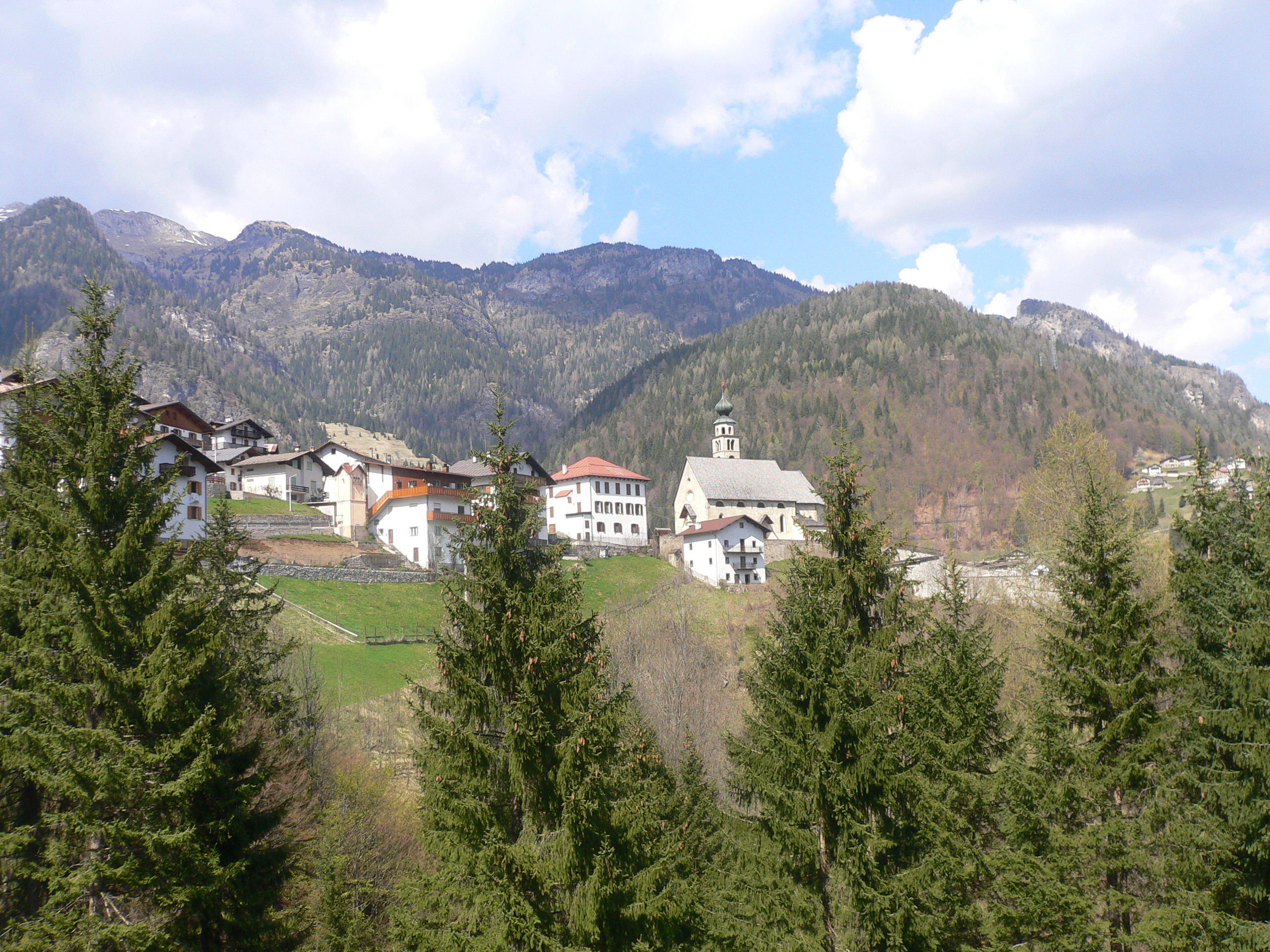
The town with the parish church

== Demographic evolution ==
Historical population

Year	Pop.	±%
1861	?	—
1871	1,332	—
1881	1,461	+9.7%
1901	1,918	+31.3%
1911	2,195	+14.4%

Year	Pop.	±%
1921	2,449	+11.6%
1931	1,974	−19.4%
1936	1,612	−18.3%
1951	1,730	+7.3%
1961	1,508	−12.8%

Year	Pop.	±%
1971	1,218	−19.2%
1981	1,038	−14.8%
1991	877	−15.5%
2001	812	−7.4%

Source: Data from ISTAT

== Twin towns ==
San Tomaso Agordino is twinned with:

- Massaranduba, Santa Catarina, Brazil, since 2011
