= Lake Vedana =

Glacial lake in Veneto, Italy

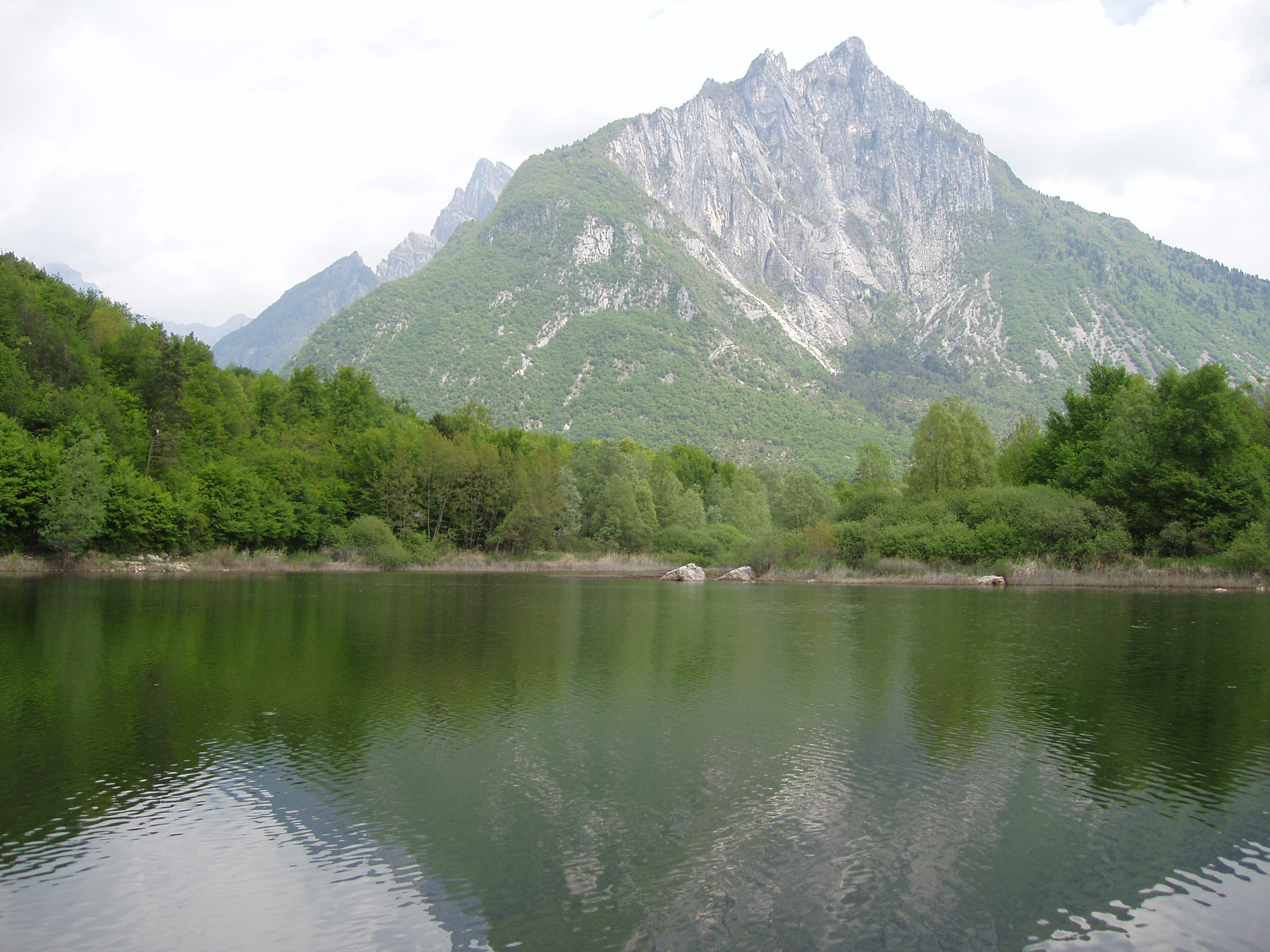
- The lake toward Monte Peron

- Location within Italy
- Location: Sospirolo, Province of Belluno, Veneto, Italy
- Coordinates: 46°09′36″N 12°06′21″E
- Type: Glacial
- Primary inflows: Underground springs
- Basin countries: Italy
- Surface area: 0.0427 km^{2} (0.0165 sq mi)

The Lake Vedana is a small body of water of glacial origin located in the municipal territory of Sospirolo, in the Province of Belluno, Italy. Situated just south of the Monti del Sole range, and a few kilometers east of the larger Lake Mis, it has no inflows or outflows, forming an endorheic basin.

The lake lies in an area of great naturalistic interest, at the gateway to the Belluno Dolomites National Park; it occupies a small depression caused by an ancient bed of the Cordevole river, within an area called Masiere, a wide expanse of large boulders and debris now largely covered by pioneer vegetation.

Lake Vedana and the peaty meadows of “Le Torbe” constitute “wetland oases”; the lake is fed by underground water veins, along the direction of an ancient abandoned valley of the Cordevole stream. The “Le Torbe” meadows likely represent the final evolutionary stage of a marsh (or lake-marsh) environment settled in a marginal depression, surrounded by coarse glacial deposits and characterized by slow and difficult drainage, with a substrate of silty-sandy soils. Near San Gottardo, the Certosa di Vedana, an ancient Carthusian monastery, is located.

The importance of this lake was noted by Caldart (1962), a Belluno naturalist, and later included among the biotopes worthy of special conservation in a historic volume published by the Società botanica italiana as part of a census conducted by the University of Camerino in 1979.

== Fauna ==
The fauna, consisting of amphibians and reptiles present in this biotope, partly already known for its characteristic elements, hosts species typical of mid-low altitude areas and predominantly thermophilic species. The fish population of the lake has been modified for recreational purposes: sport fishing is practiced at the lake. The species present include rainbow trout, carp, tench, perch, rudd, pike, and chub.

Among amphibians, the fire salamander is notably common, preferring to reproduce in well-oxygenated waters, so its presence in the biotope is mainly linked to marginal areas with abundant streams. The smooth newt is also quite common and reproduces in stagnant waters with abundant vegetation. The common toad is the most numerous species and also reproduces within the lake, where tadpoles can be found on its banks, seeking shelter among riparian vegetation to escape predation by fish. There are also the Padan tree frog, the agile frog, the green frog, the wall lizard, the slow worm, and the green lizard. Among reptiles, within the lake, the dice snake and the grass snake can be observed, the latter having been reported in a location near the biotope (Certosa di Vedana). In the surroundings of the biotope, two other snake species have been reported, the Aesculapian snake and the smooth snake.

The lake provides a good habitat for the mallard, which breeds here, and for the moorhen, often observed at the edge of the reed bed. Noteworthy is the presence of the water rail, a waterbird with few records in the Belluno area; it is reported at Lake Vedana in both spring and autumn. The grey heron also frequents the lake’s shores, where it feeds on fish, amphibians, and reptiles. In the woods around the lake, the most characteristic species is the jay, associated with the marsh tit, the great tit, the chaffinch, the robin, and the blackbird. The forested areas are frequented by the great spotted woodpecker and the nuthatch.

In the shrublands around the lake, the roe deer is also present, seemingly reaching significant population densities, while the adjacent Masiere area offers excellent reproductive habitats for the badger, which continuously digs its burrows among the boulders, and for the fox.

== Flora ==
The flora of Lake Vedana consists of various species, including:

- Persicaria amphibia (or Polygonum amphibium): the species thrives well in meso-eutrophic environments but has not been observed in recent seasons. This is one of the very few locations in the Province of Belluno.
- Nymphaea alba: compared to the 1970s, when only the typical white-flowered forms were recorded, water lilies with yellowish and pinkish flowers have appeared, likely introduced (non-native).
- Najas marina: If still present, it would be the only location in the Province of Belluno.
- Teucrium scordium: A very rare species, a good ecological indicator. Discovered by Caldart, it had not been reported again but reappeared in bloom on the western shore in June 2000.

In terms of vegetation, the body of water and its shores still represent environments of interest due to their uniqueness at the provincial level, although signs of degradation and fragmentation are evident. Around the lake, field elm is extraordinarily abundant, both in hygrophilous environments among willows and reed beds and in drier coppice areas. The wooded area covers the entire area surrounding the lake, particularly its right bank. This area corresponds to the least degraded zone, where forest management is clearly coppice. In the strip between the road leading to the Certosa di Vedana and the lake, formations related to typical orno-ostrya or hornbeam forests are present. The hornbeam, together with the manna ash, is located in the steeper and sunnier areas, while in the hollows, where soils are more mature, the white hornbeam prevails. The vegetation closest to the lake consists of various shrubs that, in addition to increasing biodiversity, have high faunal value: guelder rose, wayfaring tree, blackthorn, dogwood, purple willow.

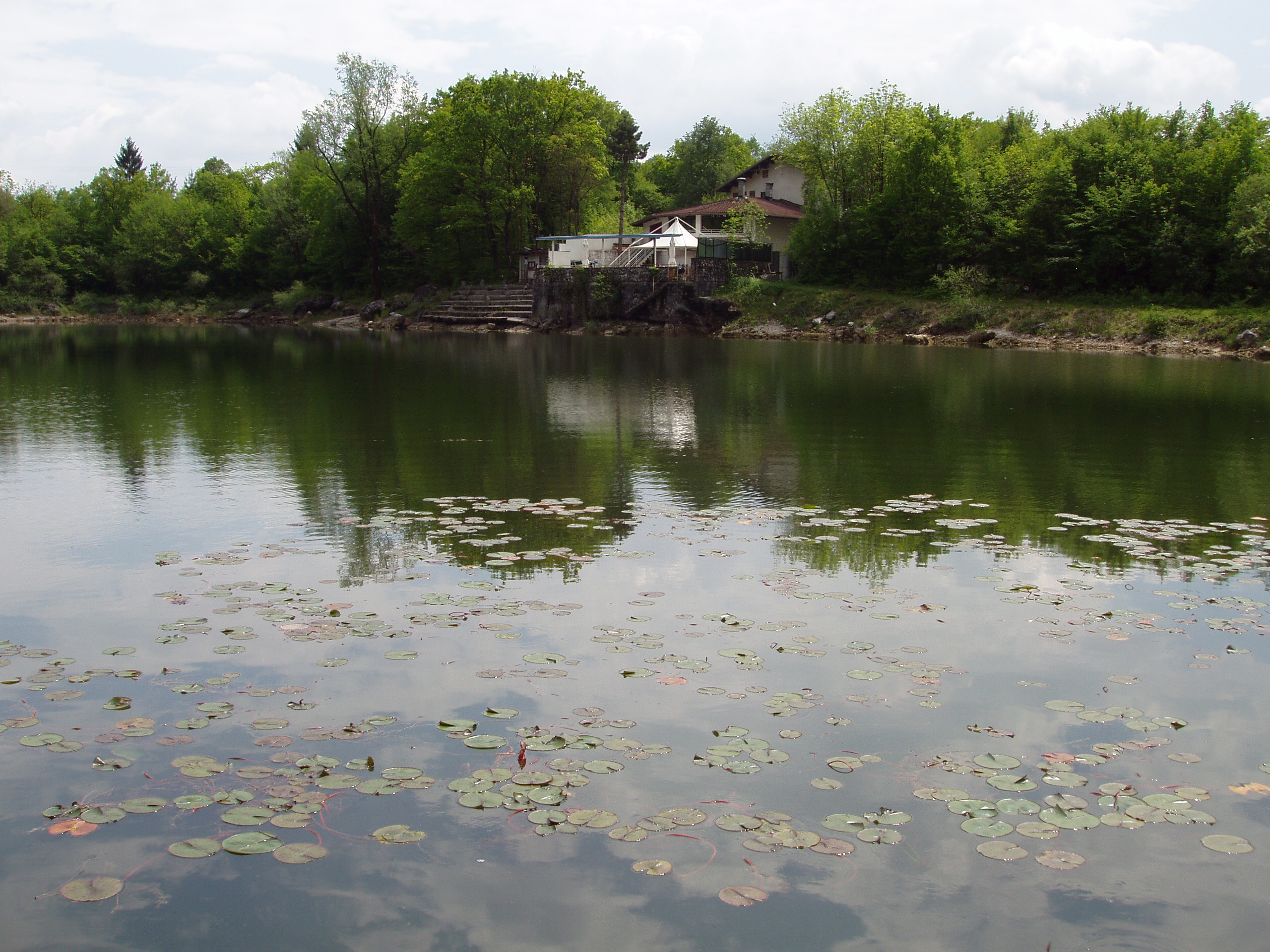
Some water lilies near the lake’s shores.

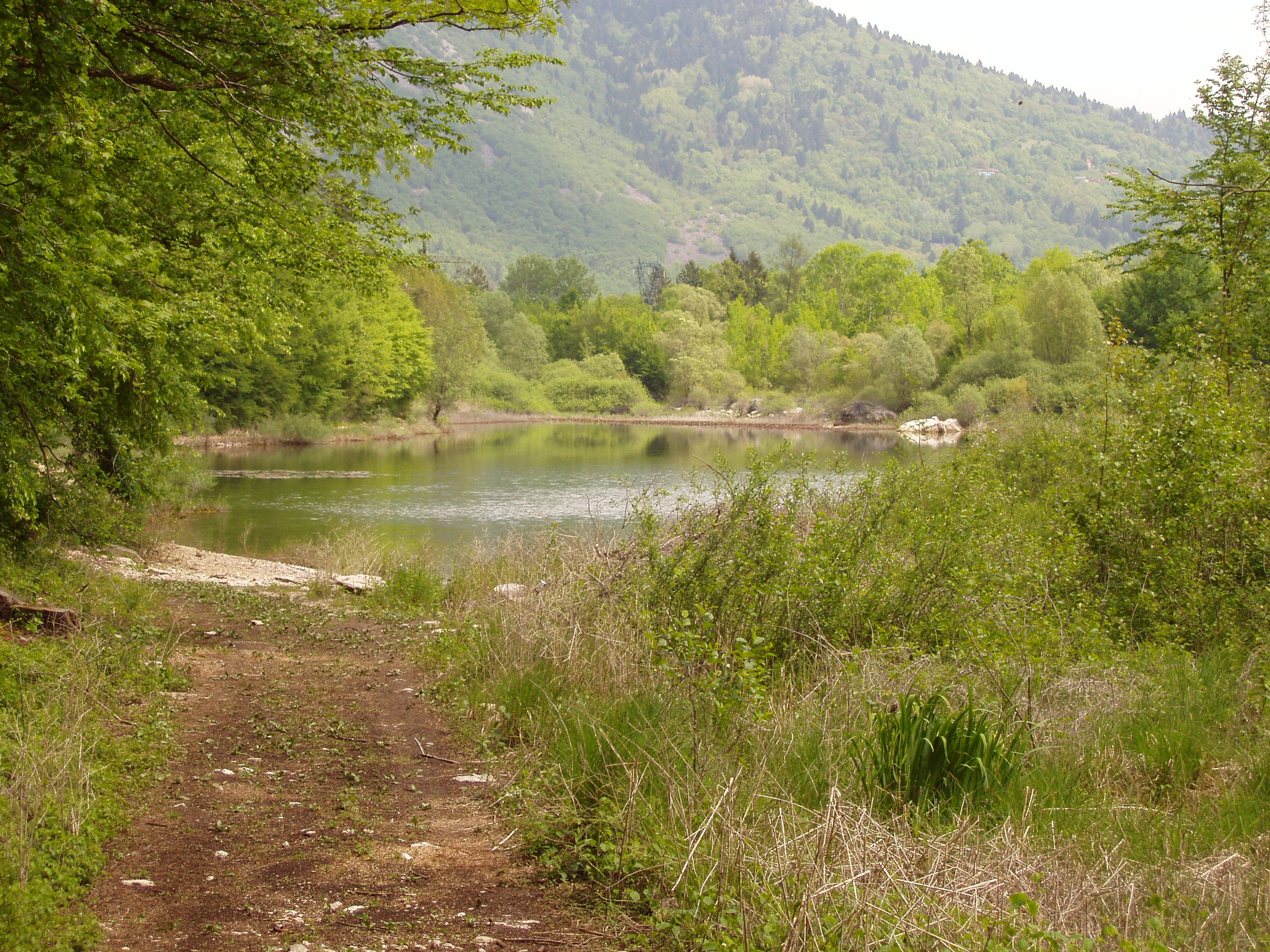
The lake and the surrounding vegetational environment.

== Bibliography ==
- Cima, Claudio (1996). I laghi delle dolomiti (2) [The Lakes of the Dolomites (2)] (in Italian). Edizioni Mediterranee. ISBN 88-272-1091-1.
- Lucchetta, A.; Scussel, R. (eds.). Lago e Torbe di Vedana [Lake and Peatlands of Vedana] (in Italian). ARPAV (Provincia di Belluno).
