= Sedico =

- Comune
- Comune di Sedico
- Location within Italy Location within Veneto
- Coordinates: 46°7′N 12°6′E
- Country: Italy
- Region: Veneto
- Province: Province of Belluno (BL)

Area
  - Total: 91.4 km^{2} (35.3 sq mi)

Population (Dec. 2004)
  - Total: 9,143
  - Density: 100/km^{2} (259/sq mi)
- Time zone: UTC+1 (CET)
  - Summer (DST): UTC+2 (CEST)
- Postal code: 32036
- Dialing code: 0437

Sedico is a comune (municipality) in the Province of Belluno in the Italian region Veneto, located about 80 kilometres (50 miles) north of Venice and about 9 km (6 mi) west of Belluno. As of 31 December 2004, it had a population of 9,143 and an area of 91.4 square kilometres (35 sq mi).

Sedico borders the following municipalities: Belluno, Gosaldo, La Valle Agordina, Limana, Longarone, Mel, Rivamonte Agordino, Santa Giustina, Sospirolo, Trichiana.

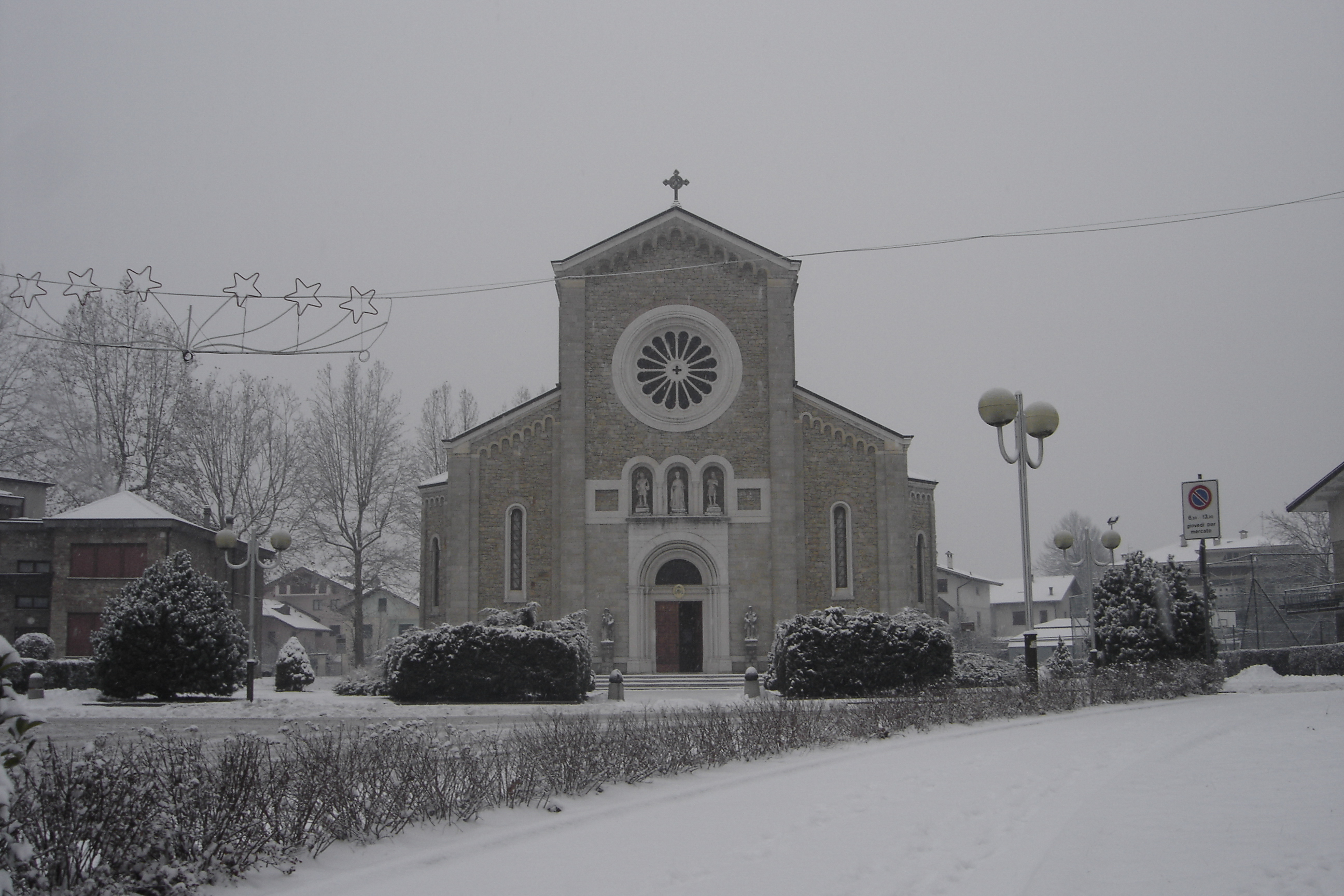
View with the Parish Church of Santa Maria Annunziata in winter

== Demographic evolution ==
Historical population

Year	Pop.	±%
1861	?	—
1871	3,976	—
1881	4,293	+8.0%
1901	4,972	+15.8%
1911	6,177	+24.2%

Year	Pop.	±%
1921	6,772	+9.6%
1931	6,506	−3.9%
1936	5,953	−8.5%
1951	6,893	+15.8%
1961	7,245	+5.1%

Year	Pop.	±%
1971	7,189	−0.8%
1981	7,706	+7.2%
1991	8,056	+4.5%
2001	8,701	+8.0%

Source: Data from ISTAT
