= Cencenighe Agordino =

Cencenighe Agordino Zenzenìghe
- Comune
- Comune di Cencenighe Agordino
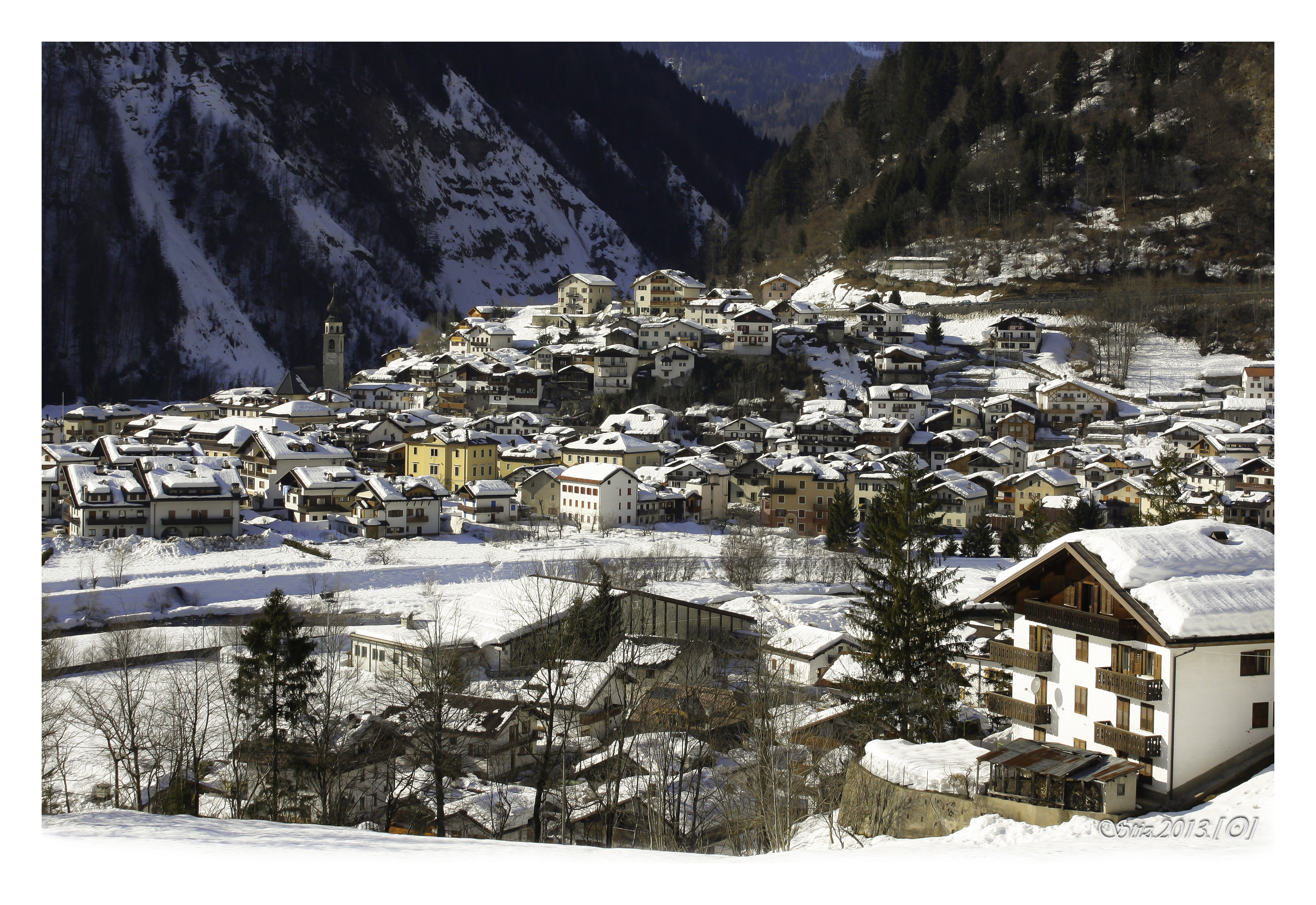

- Location within Italy Location within Veneto
- Coordinates: 46°21′N 11°58′E
- Country: Italy
- Region: Veneto
- Province: Belluno (BL)
- Frazioni: Morbiach, Ghirlo, Col da Campo (ladin: Col da Camp, Vare Basse, Vare Alte (ladin: Vare Aute), Faé, Pradimezzo (ladin: Prademez), Roa, Avoscan, Palù, Martin, Bogo, Cavarzan, Foch, Chenet, Bastiani, Lorenzon, Collaz (ladin: Colaz), Coi, Balestier

Government
  - Mayor: Mauro Soppelsa

Area
  - Total: 18.0 km^{2} (6.9 sq mi)

Population (31 May 2025)
  - Total: 1,210
  - Density: 67.2/km^{2} (174/sq mi)
- Demonym: Cencenighesi
- Time zone: UTC+1 (CET)
  - Summer (DST): UTC+2 (CEST)
- Postal code: 32020
- Dialing code: 0437
- Website: Official website

Cencenighe Agordino (Ladin: Zenzenìghe) is a comune (municipality) in the Province of Belluno in the Italian region Veneto, located about 110 kilometres (68 mi) north of Venice and about 30 kilometres (19 mi) northwest of Belluno.

Cencenighe Agordino borders the following municipalities: Canale d'Agordo, San Tomaso Agordino, Taibon Agordino, Vallada Agordina.

== Twin towns ==
Cencenighe Agordino is twinned with:

- Massaranduba, Santa Catarina, Brazil, since 2011
