= Limana =

Limana Łimana
- Comune
- Comune di Limana
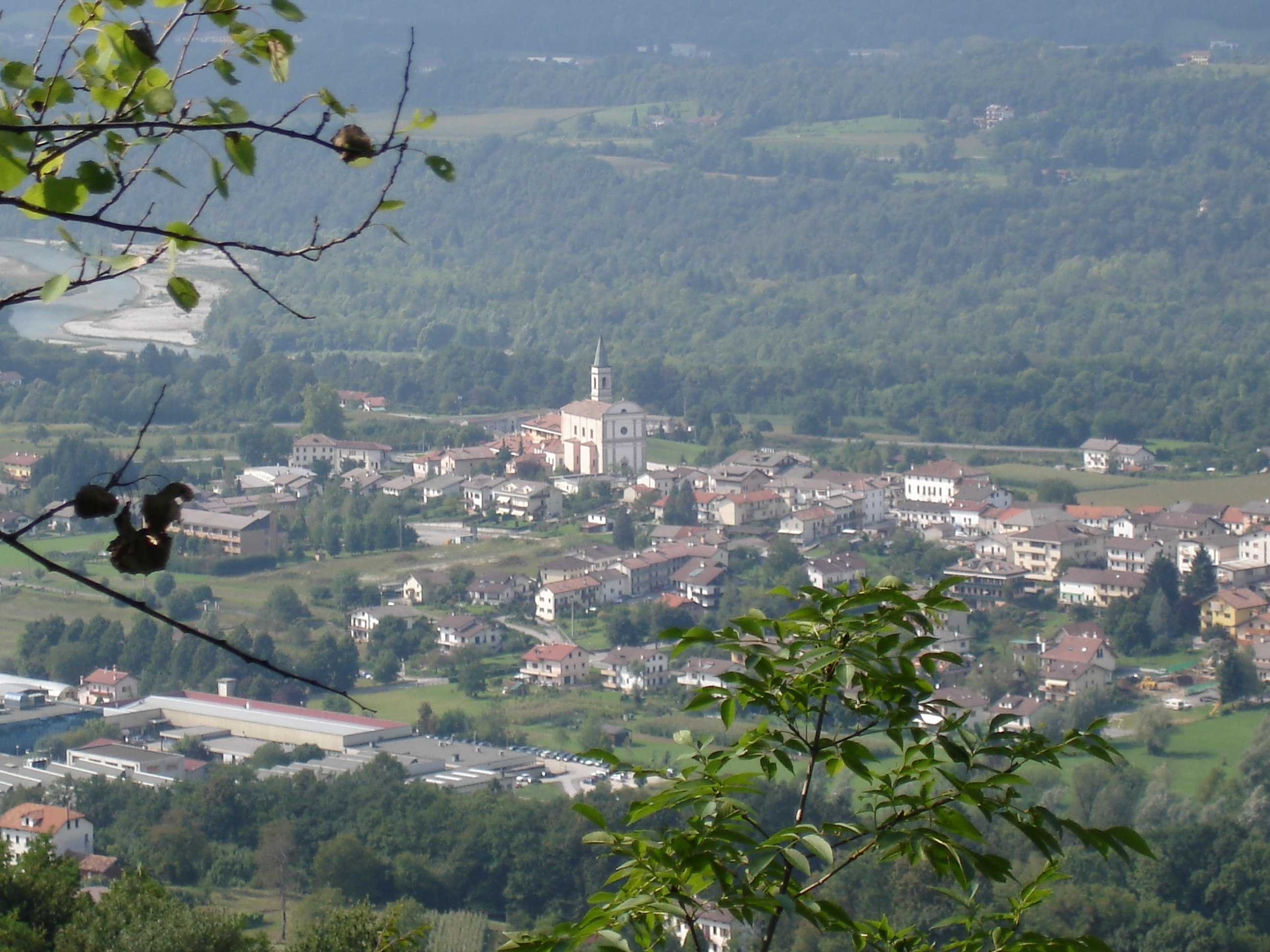

- Location within Italy Location within Veneto
- Coordinates: 46°6′N 12°11′E
- Country: Italy
- Region: Veneto
- Province: Province of Belluno (BL)
- Frazioni: Canè, Centore, Ceresera, Cesa, Cros, Giaon, La Cal, Navasa, Navenze, Pieve di Limana, Polentes, Quartiere Europa, Triches, Valmorel, Villa

Government
  - Mayor: Milena De Zanet

Area
  - Total: 39.2 km^{2} (15.1 sq mi)
- Elevation: 364 m (1,194 ft)

Population (Dec. 2017)
  - Total: 5 335
  - Density: 0.13/km^{2} (0.33/sq mi)
- Demonym: Limanesi
- Time zone: UTC+1 (CET)
  - Summer (DST): UTC+2 (CEST)
- Postal code: 32020
- Dialing code: 0437
- Website: Official website

Limana (Venetian: Łimana) is a comune (municipality) in the province of Belluno in the Italian region of Veneto, located about 70 kilometres (43 miles) north of Venice and about 5 kilometres (3 miles) southwest of Belluno. As of 31 December 2010, it had a population of 5 027 and an area of 39.2 square kilometres (15.1 sq mi).

Limana is situated in the middle of Valbelluna, at the foot of prealpi and in front of the dolomites massif, crossed by the river Piave in the north side. The lower point is situated in the shore of the river at 320 metres (1,050 feet) above sea level, while the highest is on the top of Monte Pezza at 1,468 metres (4,816 feet). The commune belongs to the mountain union called Val Belluna.

Limana borders the following municipalities: Belluno, Revine Lago, Sedico, Trichiana, Vittorio Veneto.

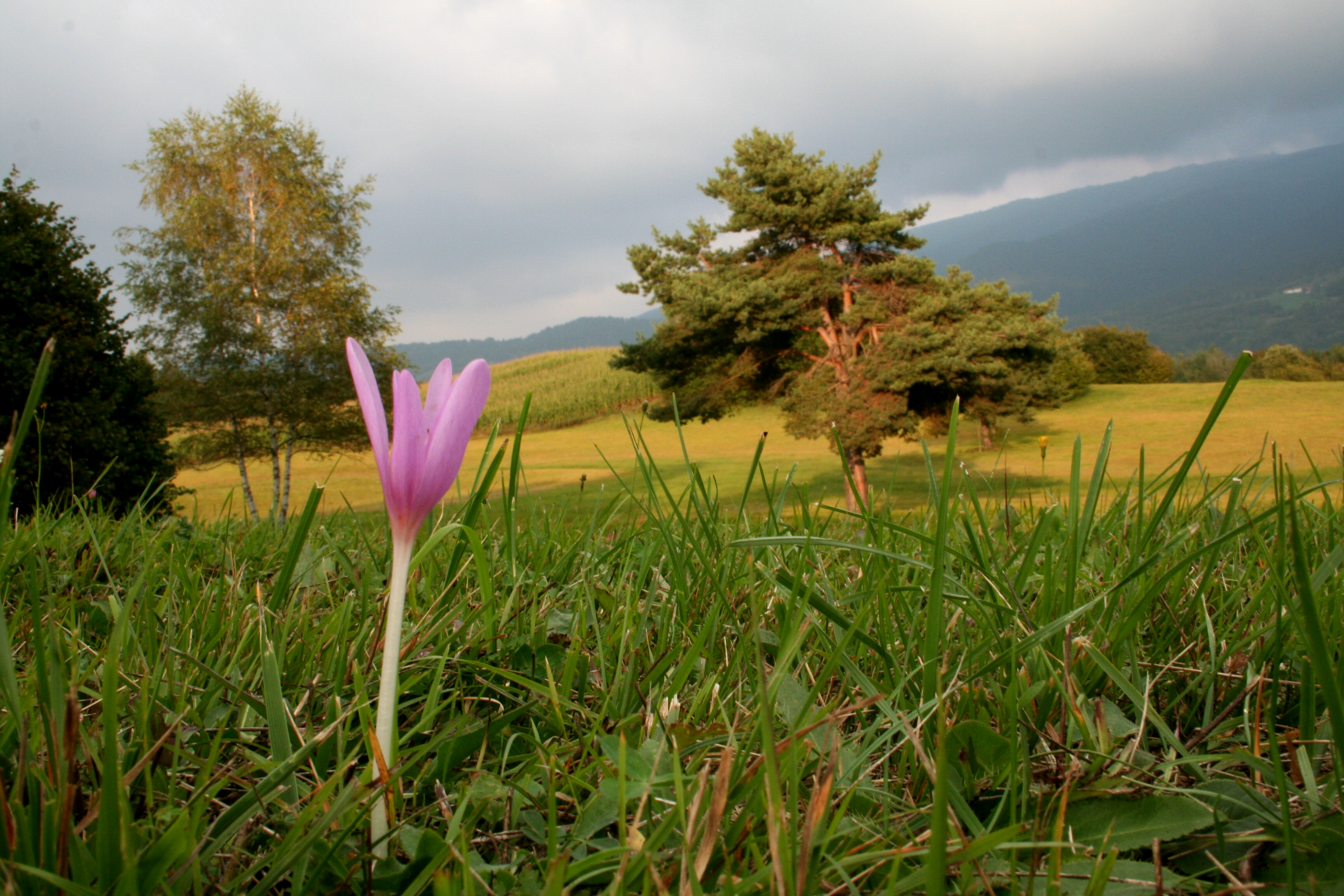
Colchicum autumnale in Valrmorel.

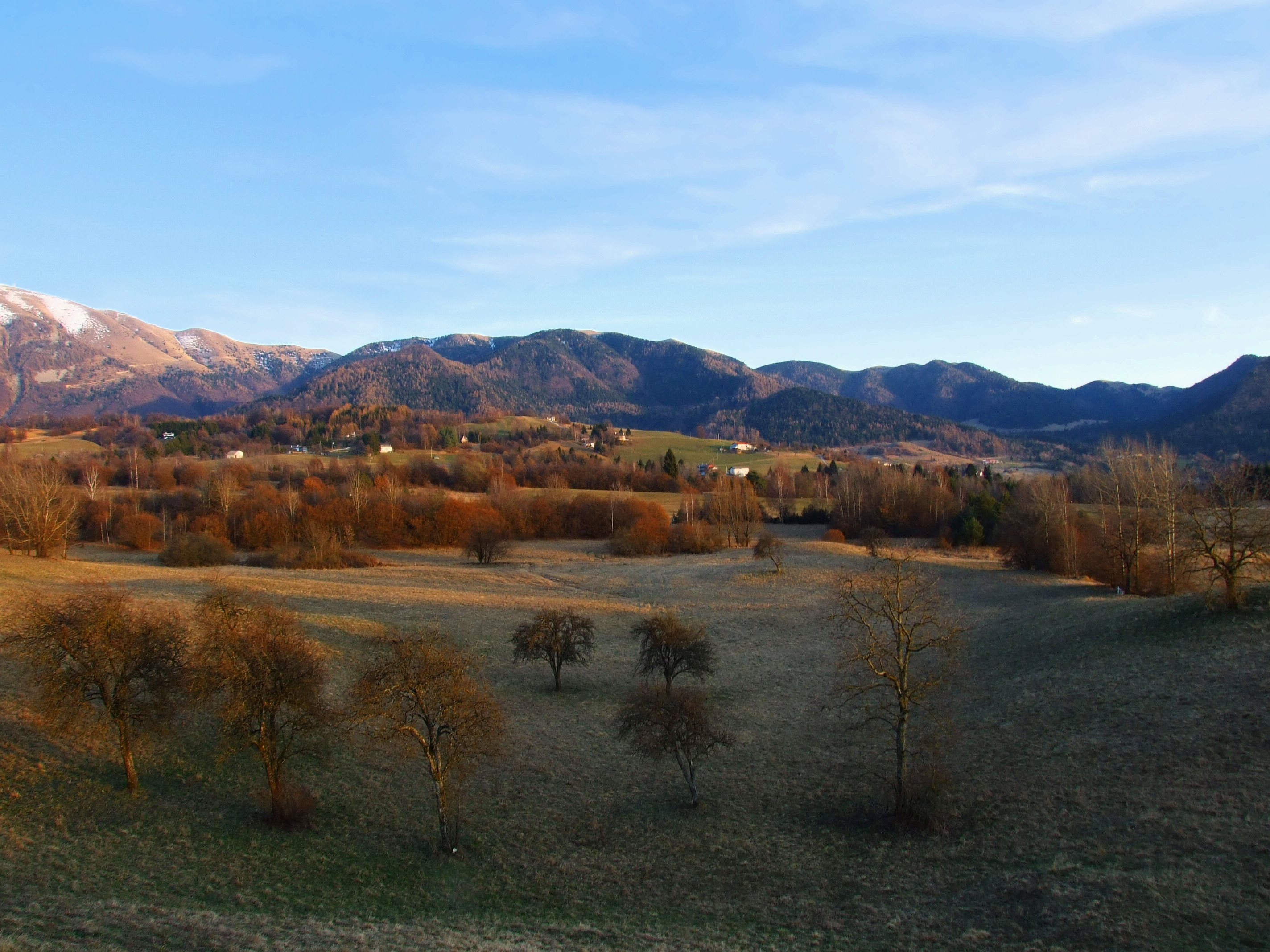
Landscape in Valpiana

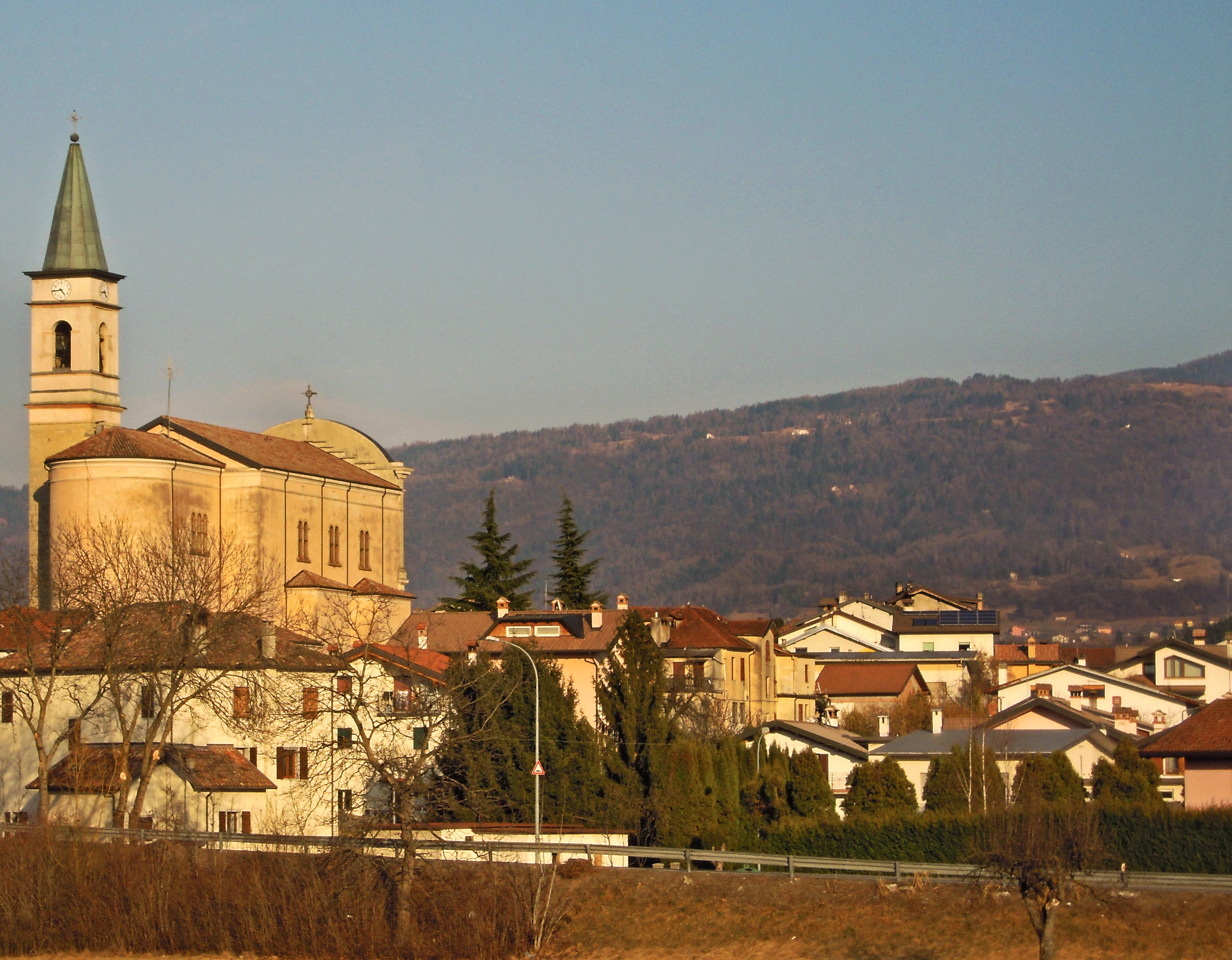
the town with the parish Church

== Demographic evolution ==
Historical population

Year	Pop.	±%
1861	?	—
1871	2,131	—
1881	2,289	+7.4%
1901	2,597	+13.5%
1911	3,066	+18.1%

Year	Pop.	±%
1921	3,794	+23.7%
1931	3,820	+0.7%
1936	3,283	−14.1%
1951	3,610	+10.0%
1961	3,701	+2.5%

Year	Pop.	±%
1971	3,579	−3.3%
1981	3,984	+11.3%
1991	4,165	+4.5%
2001	4,509	+8.3%
2011	5,057	+12.2%

Source: Data from ISTAT

== Twin towns ==
Limana is twinned with:

- Grass Valley, California, United States
- Longuyon, France
- Schmitshausen, Germany
- Walferdange, Luxembourg
