= Santa Giustina =

- Comune
- Comune di Santa Giustina
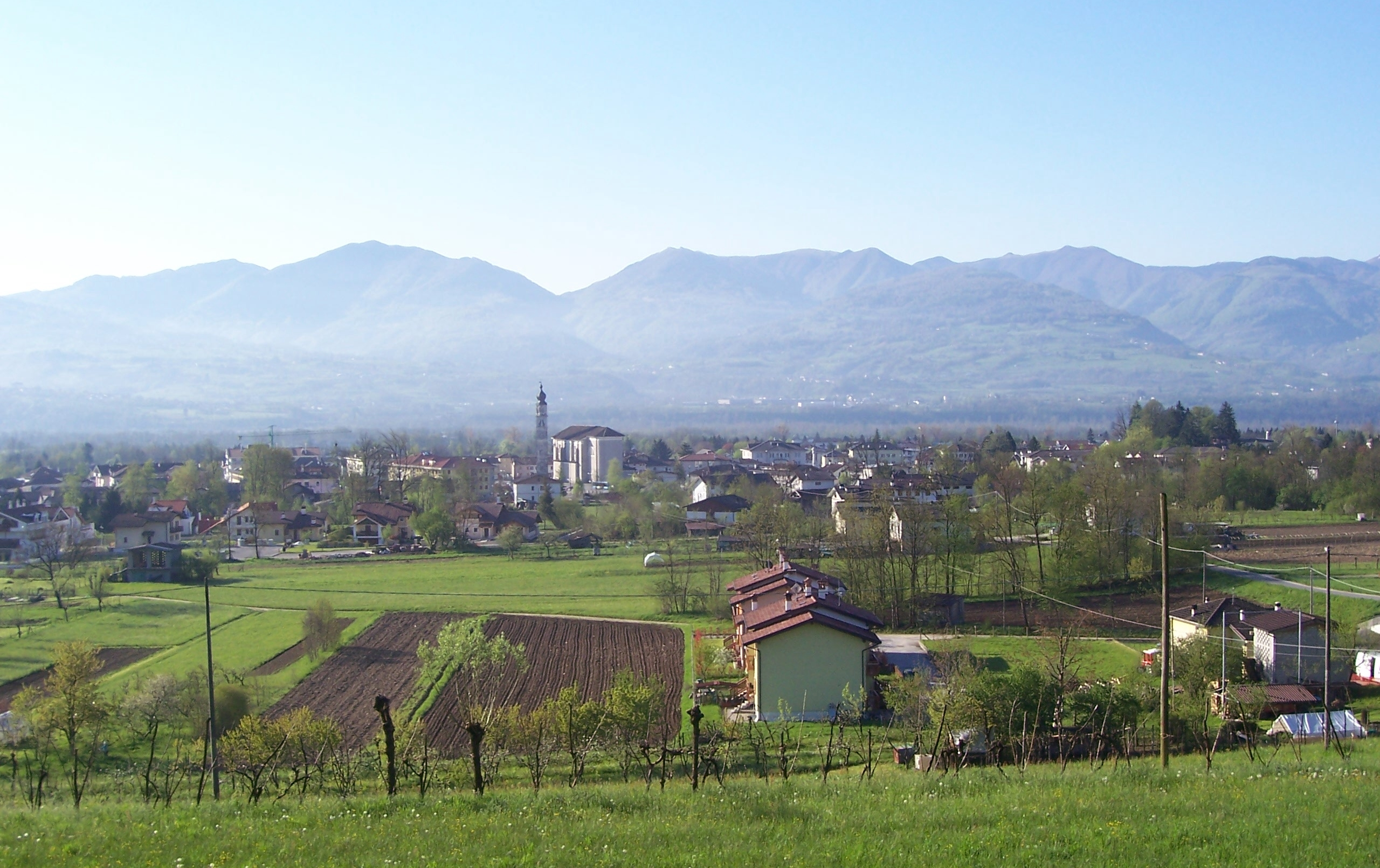

- Coat of arms

- Location within Italy Location within Veneto
- Coordinates: 46°5′N 12°2′E
- Country: Italy
- Region: Veneto
- Province: Belluno (BL)
- Frazioni: Bivai, Callibago, Campel, Campo, Carfai, Casabellata, Cassol, Castel, Cergnai, Coldiferro, Colvago, al Cristo, Dussano, Fant, Formegan, Fornaci, Gravazze, Ignan, Lasserai, Marianne, Mas, Meano, Morzanch, Piovena, Salmenega, Salzan, San Martino, Santa Libera, Santa Margherita, San Vittore Veses, Sartena, Villa di Pria, Volpere

Government
  - Mayor: Ivan Minella

Area
  - Total: 35.9 km^{2} (13.9 sq mi)
- Elevation: 306 m (1,004 ft)

Population (2008)
  - Total: 6,800
  - Density: 190/km^{2} (490/sq mi)
- Demonym: Santagiustinesi
- Time zone: UTC+1 (CET)
  - Summer (DST): UTC+2 (CEST)
- Postal code: 32035
- Dialing code: 0437
- Website: Official website

Santa Giustina is a comune (municipality) in the province of Belluno in the Italian region of Veneto, located about 80 kilometres (50 miles) northwest of Venice and about 15 km (9 mi) southwest of Belluno.

Santa Giustina borders the following municipalities: Cesiomaggiore, Lentiai, Mel, San Gregorio nelle Alpi, Sedico, Sospirolo. Mount Pizzocco is located nearby.

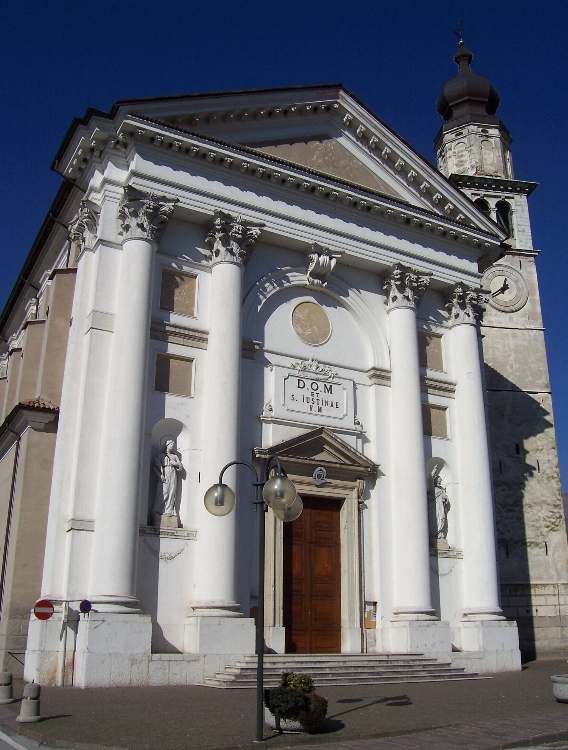
S. Giustina Church

== Twin towns ==
- São Valentim, Brazil
