= Voltago Agordino =

- Comune
- Comune di Voltago Agordino
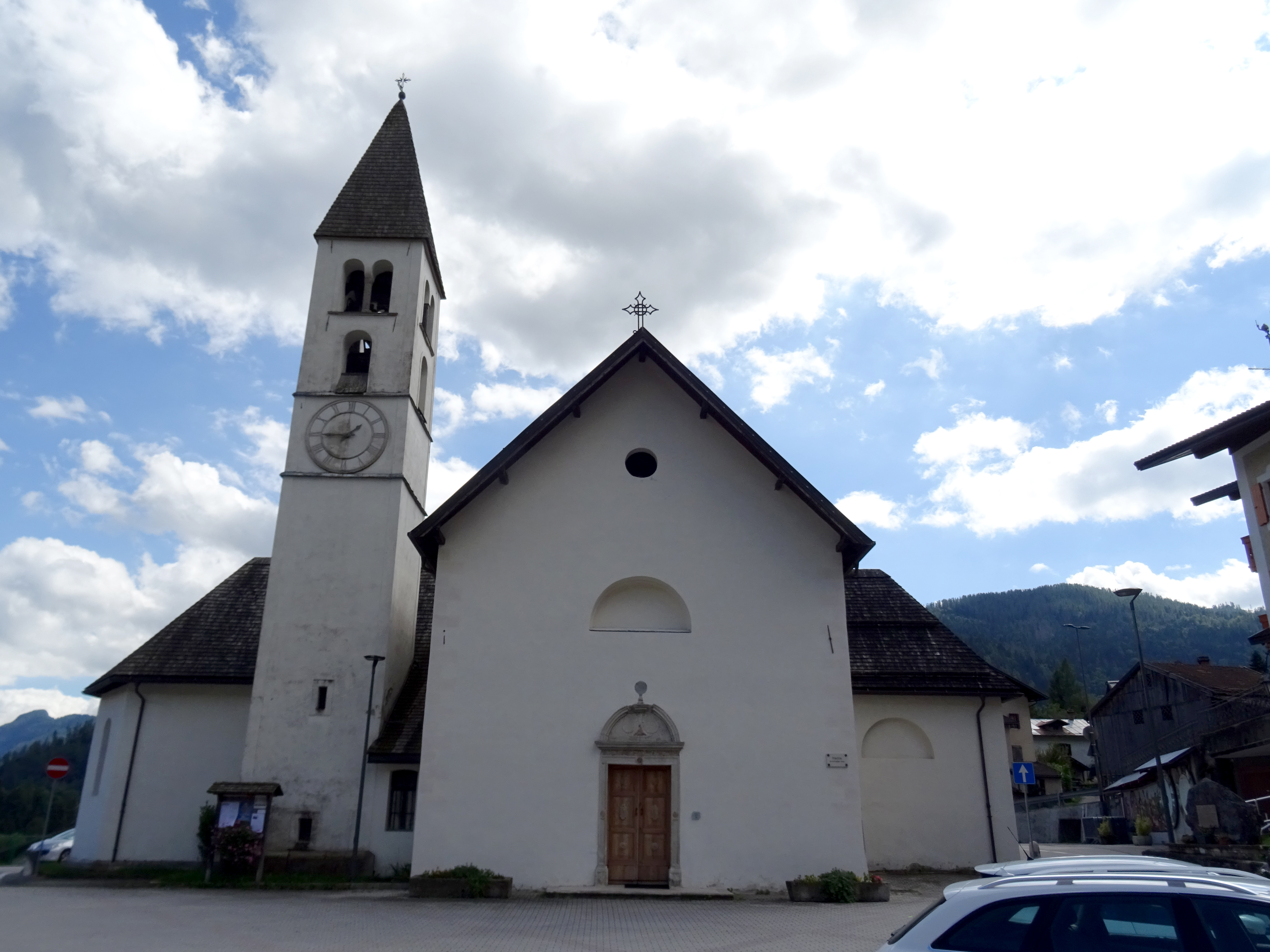
- Church of Santi Vittore e Corona

- Location within Italy Location within Veneto
- Coordinates: 46°16′N 12°2′E
- Country: Italy
- Region: Veneto
- Province: Province of Belluno (BL)

Area
  - Total: 23.0 km^{2} (8.9 sq mi)

Population (Dec. 2004)
  - Total: 973
  - Density: 42.3/km^{2} (110/sq mi)
- Time zone: UTC+1 (CET)
  - Summer (DST): UTC+2 (CEST)
- Postal code: 32020
- Dialing code: 0437

Voltago Agordino (Ladin: Oltach) is a village and comune (municipality) in the Province of Belluno, Veneto Region of Northeast Italy. It is located about 100 kilometres (62 mi) north of Venice and about 20 kilometres (12 mi) northwest of Belluno. As of 31 December 2004, it had a population of 973 and an area of 23.0 square kilometres (8.9 mi^{2}).

Voltago Agordino borders the following municipalities: Agordo, Gosaldo, Rivamonte Agordino, Taibon Agordino and Tonadico.

== Demographic evolution ==
Historical population

Year	Pop.	±%
1861	?	—
1871	1,198	—
1881	1,248	+4.2%
1901	1,295	+3.8%
1911	1,426	+10.1%

Year	Pop.	±%
1921	1,478	+3.6%
1931	1,383	−6.4%
1936	1,341	−3.0%
1951	1,443	+7.6%
1961	1,358	−5.9%

Year	Pop.	±%
1971	1,210	−10.9%
1981	1,087	−10.2%
1991	1,017	−6.4%
2001	991	−2.6%

Source: Data from ISTAT
