= Gosaldo =

- Comune
- Comune di Gosaldo
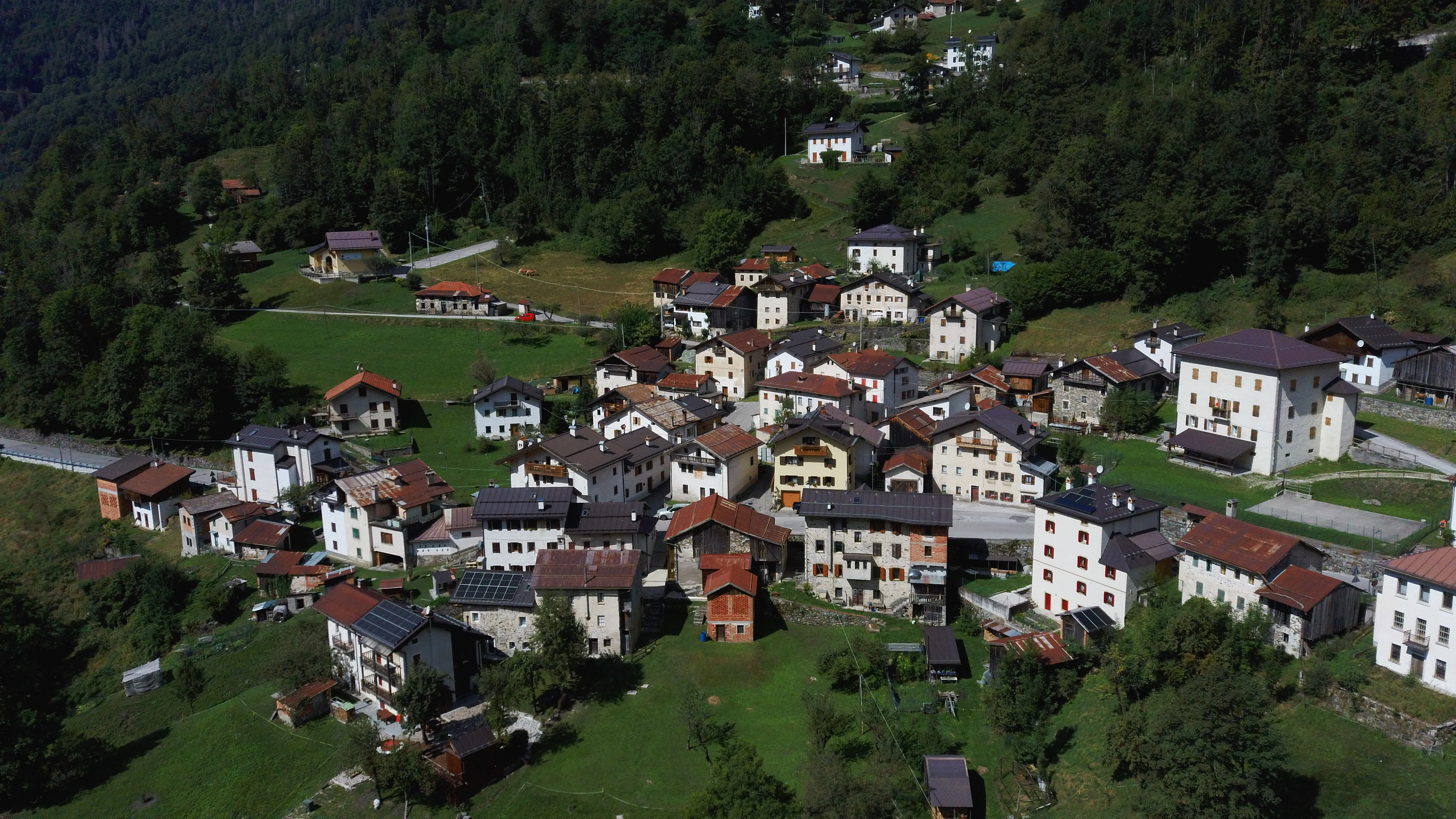
- View of Tiser, Gosaldo

- Location within Italy Location within Veneto
- Coordinates: 46°13′N 11°57′E
- Country: Italy
- Region: Veneto
- Province: Province of Belluno (BL)
- Frazioni: Don, Sarasin, Tiser

Area
  - Total: 48.8 km^{2} (18.8 sq mi)
- Elevation: 1,141 m (3,743 ft)

Population (Dec. 2004)
  - Total: 843
  - Density: 17.3/km^{2} (44.7/sq mi)
- Time zone: UTC+1 (CET)
  - Summer (DST): UTC+2 (CEST)
- Postal code: 32020
- Dialing code: 0437
- Website: Official website

Gosaldo (ladin: Gosalt) is a comune (municipality) in the Province of Belluno in the Italian region Veneto, located about 90 kilometres (56 miles) northwest of Venice and about 25 km (16 mi) northwest of Belluno. As of 31 December 2004, it had a population of 843 and an area of 48.8 square kilometres (18.8 sq mi).

The municipality of Gosaldo contains the frazioni (subdivisions, mainly villages and hamlets) Don, Sarasin, and Tiser.

Gosaldo borders the following municipalities: Cesiomaggiore, Rivamonte Agordino, Sagron Mis, Sedico, Sospirolo, Taibon Agordino, Tonadico, Voltago Agordino.

== Demographic evolution ==
Historical population

Year	Pop.	±%
1861	?	—
1871	2,935	—
1881	2,907	−1.0%
1901	3,156	+8.6%
1911	3,067	−2.8%

Year	Pop.	±%
1921	3,045	−0.7%
1931	2,755	−9.5%
1936	2,539	−7.8%
1951	2,738	+7.8%
1961	2,373	−13.3%

Year	Pop.	±%
1971	1,825	−23.1%
1981	1,192	−34.7%
1991	1,034	−13.3%
2001	884	−14.5%

Source: Data from ISTAT

== Twin towns ==
Gosaldo is twinned with:

- Saint-Marcel-Bel-Accueil, France, since 2011
