= Taibon Agordino =

- Comune
- Comune di Taibon Agordino
- Location within Italy Location within Veneto
- Coordinates: 46°18′N 12°1′E
- Country: Italy
- Region: Veneto
- Province: Province of Belluno (BL)

Area
  - Total: 90.4 km^{2} (34.9 sq mi)
- Elevation: 618 m (2,028 ft)

Population (Dec. 2004)
  - Total: 1,790
  - Density: 19.8/km^{2} (51.3/sq mi)
- Time zone: UTC+1 (CET)
  - Summer (DST): UTC+2 (CEST)
- Postal code: 32027
- Dialing code: 0437

Taibon Agordino is a comune (municipality) in the province of Belluno in the Italian region of Veneto, located about 100 kilometres (62 mi) north of Venice and about 25 kilometres (16 mi) northwest of Belluno. As of 31 December 2004, it had a population of 1,790 and an area of 90.4 square kilometres (34.9 mi^{2}).

Many of the homes in Taibon have descended within families. It is common for younger generations to move out of the valley to a larger city for the purpose of building a career and subsequently return for retirement. Taibon was once populated by homesteaders who were self-sufficient, making their own dairy products, sausage, and polenta as their source of carbohydrates. Today these family homes are notable because of the family history they represent, and because they are adjacent to many backpacking, skiing, and road cycling trails.

Taibon Agordino borders the following municipalities: Agordo, Alleghe, Canale d'Agordo, Cencenighe Agordino, Gosaldo, San Tomaso Agordino, Tonadico, Voltago Agordino, Zoldo Alto.

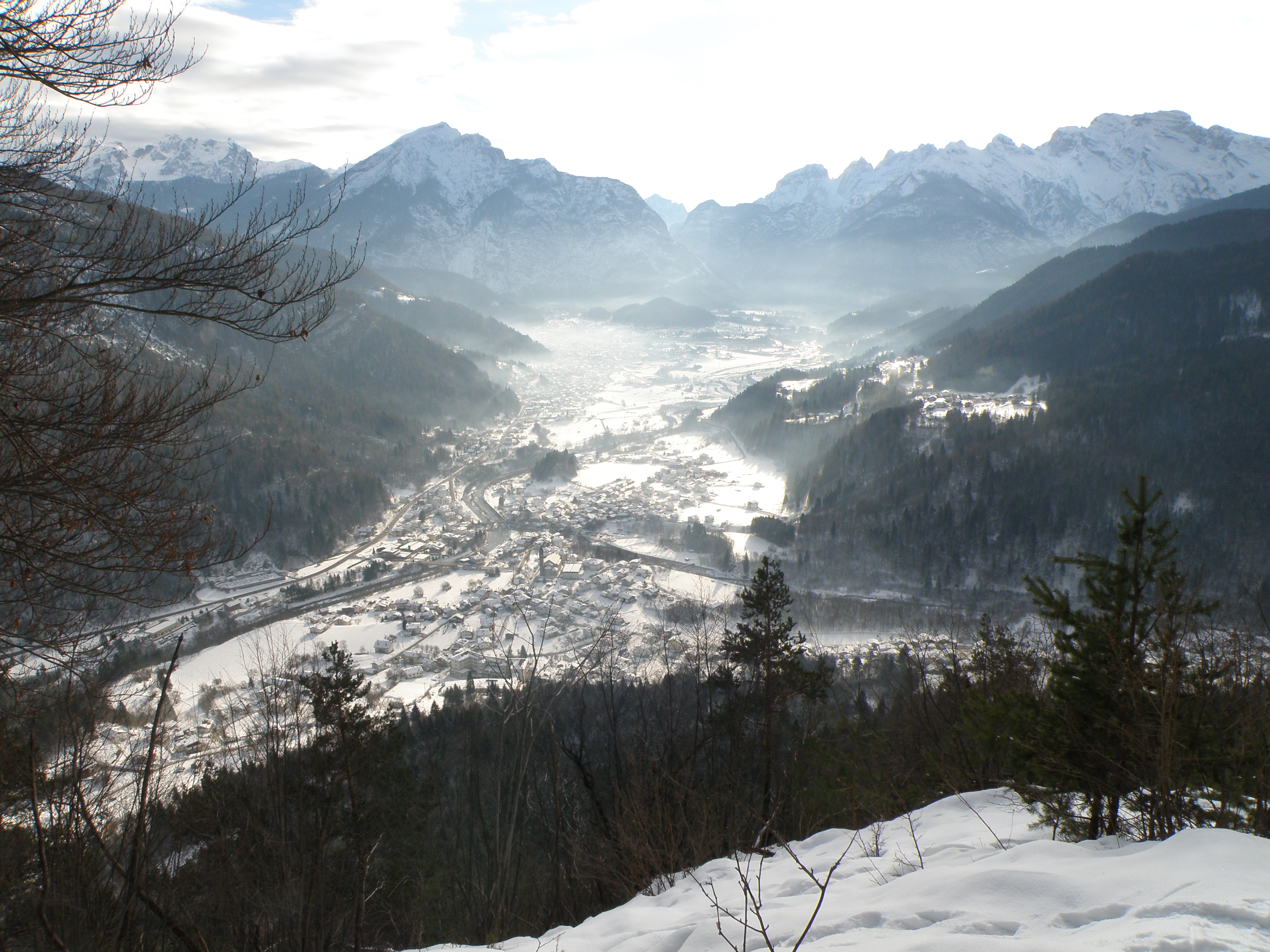
View of the town in winter

== Points of interest ==
- Giardino Alpino "Antonio Segni", an alpine botanical garden

Today's economy in Taibon is based on tourism in the Dolomite mountains and the Luxottica plant located in nearby Agordo. This eyeglass fabrication facility employs 3,500 people, making glasses under brand names such as Costa Del Mar, Ray Ban, Persol, and Oakley.

== Demographic evolution ==
Historical population

Year	Pop.	±%
1861	?	—
1871	1,888	—
1881	2,076	+10.0%
1901	2,179	+5.0%
1911	2,220	+1.9%

Year	Pop.	±%
1921	2,457	+10.7%
1931	1,998	−18.7%
1936	1,739	−13.0%
1951	1,879	+8.1%
1961	1,824	−2.9%

Year	Pop.	±%
1971	1,743	−4.4%
1981	1,811	+3.9%
1991	1,705	−5.9%
2001	1,772	+3.9%

Source: Data from ISTAT
