= Rocca Pietore =

- Comune
- Comune di Rocca Pietore
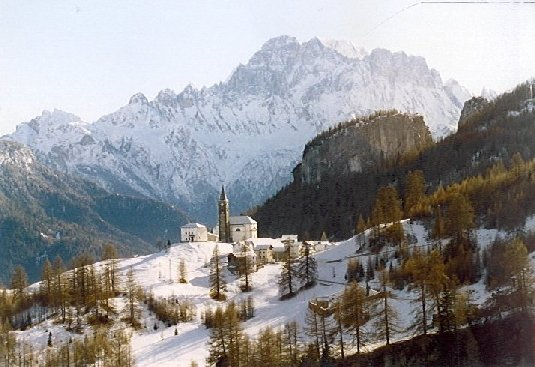

- Coat of arms

- Location within Italy Location within Veneto
- Coordinates: 46°26′N 11°59′E
- Country: Italy
- Region: Veneto
- Province: Belluno (BL)
- Frazioni: Laste, Calloneghe

Government
  - Mayor: Severino Andrea De Bernardin

Area
  - Total: 73.29 km^{2} (28.30 sq mi)
- Elevation: 1,143 m (3,750 ft)

Population (31 December 2017)
  - Total: 1,203
  - Density: 16.41/km^{2} (42.51/sq mi)
- Demonym: Rocchesani
- Time zone: UTC+1 (CET)
  - Summer (DST): UTC+2 (CEST)
- Postal code: 32020
- Dialing code: 0437
- Website: Official website

Rocca Pietore is a comune (municipality) in the Province of Belluno in the Italian region Veneto, located about 160 kilometres (99 mi) north of Venice and about 40 kilometres (25 mi) northwest of Belluno. Its frazione of Sottoguda is one of I Borghi più belli d'Italia ("The most beautiful villages of Italy").
