= Sospirolo =

- Comune
- Comune di Sospirolo
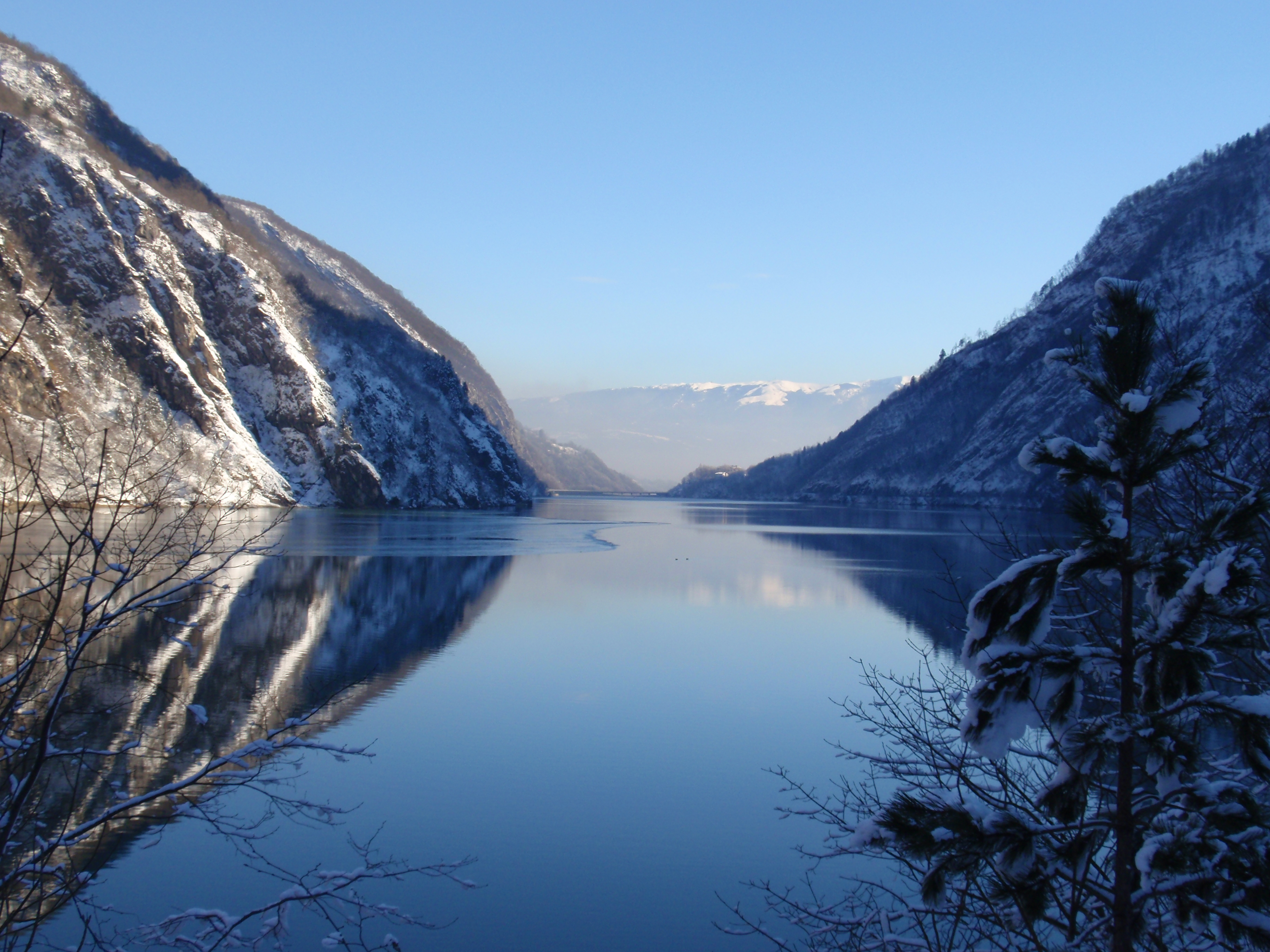

- Location within Italy Location within Veneto
- Coordinates: 46°8′N 12°5′E
- Country: Italy
- Region: Veneto
- Province: Belluno (BL)

Government
  - Mayor: Renato Moro

Area
  - Total: 66.0 km^{2} (25.5 sq mi)

Population (Dec. 2004)
  - Total: 3,212
  - Density: 48.7/km^{2} (126/sq mi)
- Demonym: Sospirolesi
- Time zone: UTC+1 (CET)
  - Summer (DST): UTC+2 (CEST)
- Postal code: 32037
- Dialing code: 0437
- Website: http://www.comune.sospirolo.bl.it

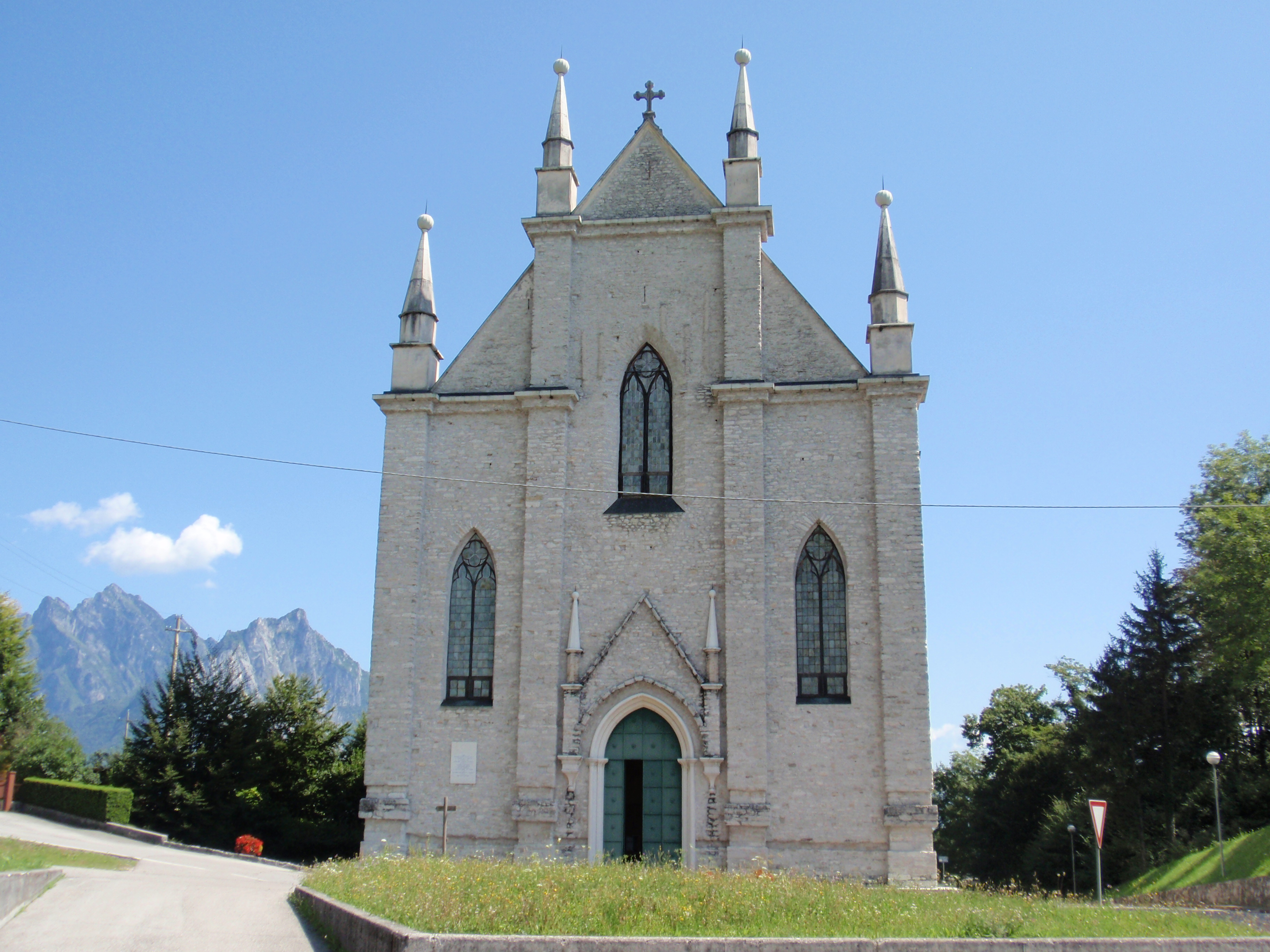
Parish Church

Sospirolo is a comune (municipality) in the province of Belluno in the Italian region of Veneto, located about 80 kilometres (50 mi) north of Venice and about 10 kilometres (6 mi) west of Belluno.Sospirolo has an area of 65.86 km² area and a population density of 46.64 per km² with an annual population change of -0.40%(2011-2023).

== See also ==
- Lake Vedana
