= Cima di Pramper =

Mountain in Italy

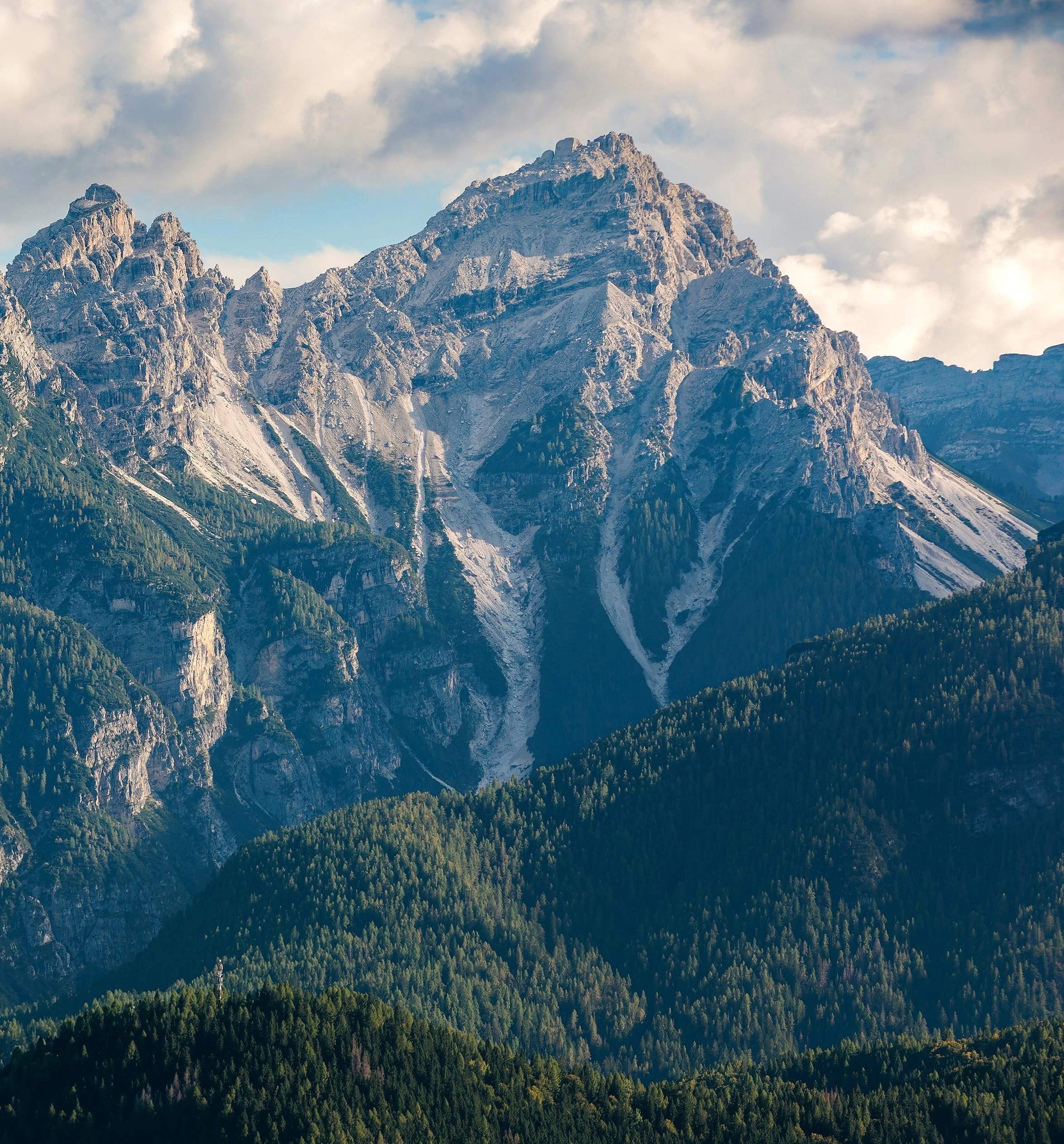
- North aspect

Highest point
- Elevation: 2,409 m (7,904 ft)
- Prominence: 544 m (1,785 ft)
- Parent peak: Monte Tamer
- Isolation: 2.53 km (1.57 mi)
- Listing: Prominent mountains of the Alps
- Coordinates: 46°17′48″N 12°10′00″E

Geography
- Location within Italy Location within Alps
- Interactive map of Cima di Pramper
- Country: Italy
- Region: Veneto
- Protected area: Dolomiti Bellunesi National Park
- Parent range: Dolomites
- Topo map(s): Tabacco 25 Dolomites of Zoldo, Cadore and Agordine

Geology
- Rock age: Triassic
- Rock type: Dolomite

Cima di Pramper is a mountain in the Veneto region of northern Italy.

== Description ==
Cima di Pramper is a 2,409-meter-elevation (7,904-foot) summit in the Dolomites. Set in the Province of Belluno, the peak is located five kilometers (3.1 miles) south of the municipality of Forno di Zoldo. The peak is set on the boundary of Dolomiti Bellunesi National Park, a UNESCO World Heritage Site. Precipitation runoff from the mountain's slopes drains into Torrente Pramper and Torrente Maè which are tributaries of the Piave. Topographic relief is significant as the summit rises over 1,000 meters (3,281 feet) above the Pramper Valley in 1.5 kilometers (0.93 mile), and 1,760 meters (5,774 feet) above the Maè Valley in four kilometers (2.5 miles). The nearest higher neighbor is Cima de Zità Nord, 2.53 kilometers (1.6 miles) to the south-southwest.

== Climate ==
Based on the Köppen climate classification, Cima di Pramper is located in an alpine climate zone with long, cold winters, and short, mild summers. Weather systems are forced upward by the mountains (orographic lift), causing moisture to drop in the form of rain and snow. The months of June through September offer the most favorable weather for climbing or visiting this area.

== See also ==
- Southern Limestone Alps
