= Lago di Calaita =

Lake in Trentino, Italy

- Location within Italy
- Location: Trentino
- Coordinates: 46.203°N 11.793°E
- Basin countries: Italy
- Surface area: 0.025 km^{2} (0.0097 sq mi)
- Surface elevation: 1,620 m (5,310 ft)

Lago di Calaita is a lake in Trentino, Italy. At an elevation of 1620 m, its surface area is 0.025 km².

The lake is included in the territory of the Paneveggio-Pale di San Martino Natural Park.

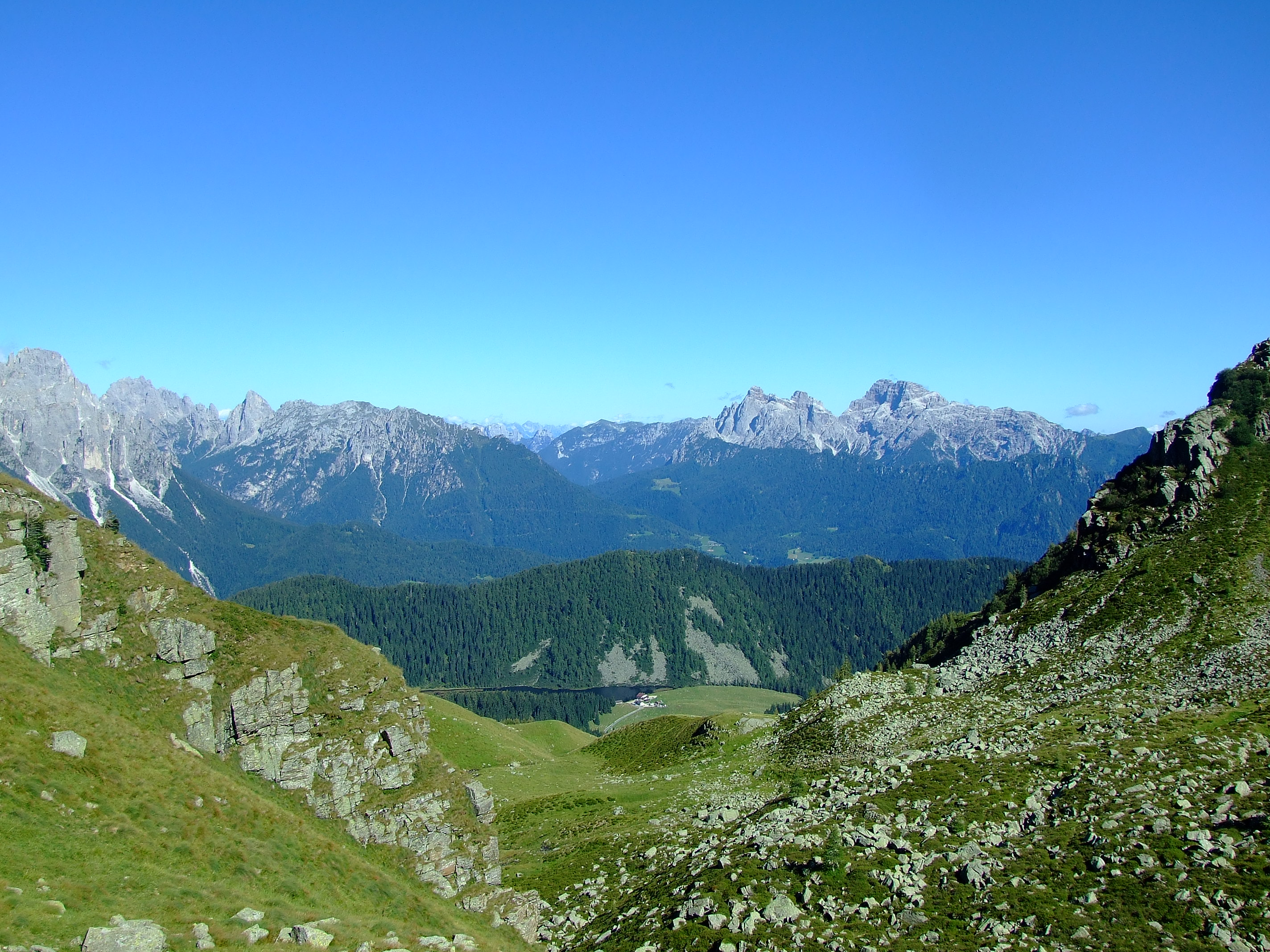
Calaita lake and the mountains Sass de Mur and Piz di Sagron
