= Castello di Moschesin =

Mountain in Italy

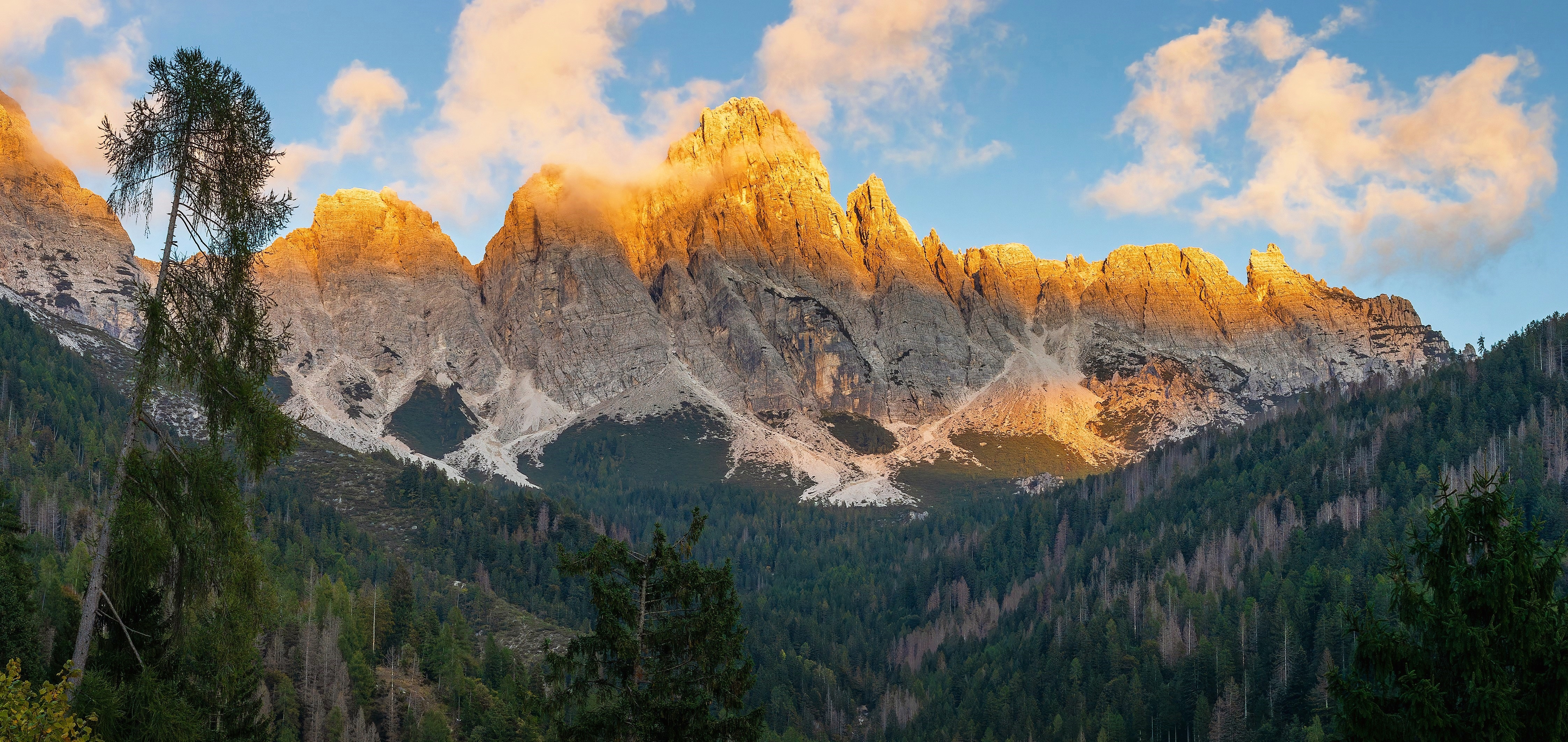
- West aspect at sunset

Highest point
- Elevation: 2,499 m (8,199 ft)
- Prominence: 325 m (1,066 ft)
- Parent peak: Tamer Piccolo
- Isolation: 1.6 km (0.99 mi)
- Coordinates: 46°17′50″N 12°07′58″E

Naming
- Etymology: Moschesin Castle

Geography
- Location within Italy
- Country: Italy
- Province: Belluno
- Protected area: Dolomiti Bellunesi National Park
- Parent range: Dolomites
- Topo map(s): Tabacco Topo Map 025 – Dolomites of Zoldo, Cadore and Agordine

Geology
- Rock age: Triassic
- Rock type: Dolomite

Climbing
- First ascent: 1885

Castello di Moschesin is a mountain in the province of Belluno of northern Italy.

== Description ==
Castello di Moschesin, labeled as Monte Castello on the official IGM map, is a 2,499-meter-elevation (8,199-foot) summit in the Dolomites in the Veneto region. The peak is located seven kilometers (4.35 miles) east-northeast of the town of Agordo, and the peak is the sixth-highest in Dolomiti Bellunesi National Park, a UNESCO World Heritage Site. Precipitation runoff from the mountain's slopes drains into tributaries of the Piave. Topographic relief is significant as the summit rises 950 meters (3,117 feet) along the east slope in approximately one kilometer (0.6 mile), and 1,150 meters (3,773 feet) along the west slope in two kilometers (1.24 miles). The nearest higher neighbor is Tamer Grande, 1.6 kilometer (1 mile) to the northwest. The mountain is named in association with Forcella Moschesin (Moschesin Pass) adjacent to the south, and the first known ascent of the summit was made in 1885 by IGM topographers.

== Climate ==
Based on the Köppen climate classification, Castello di Moschesin is located in an alpine climate zone with long, cold winters, and short, mild summers. Weather systems are forced upwards by the mountains (orographic lift), causing moisture to drop in the form of rain and snow. The months of June through September offer the most favorable weather for visiting or climbing in this area.

== Gallery ==
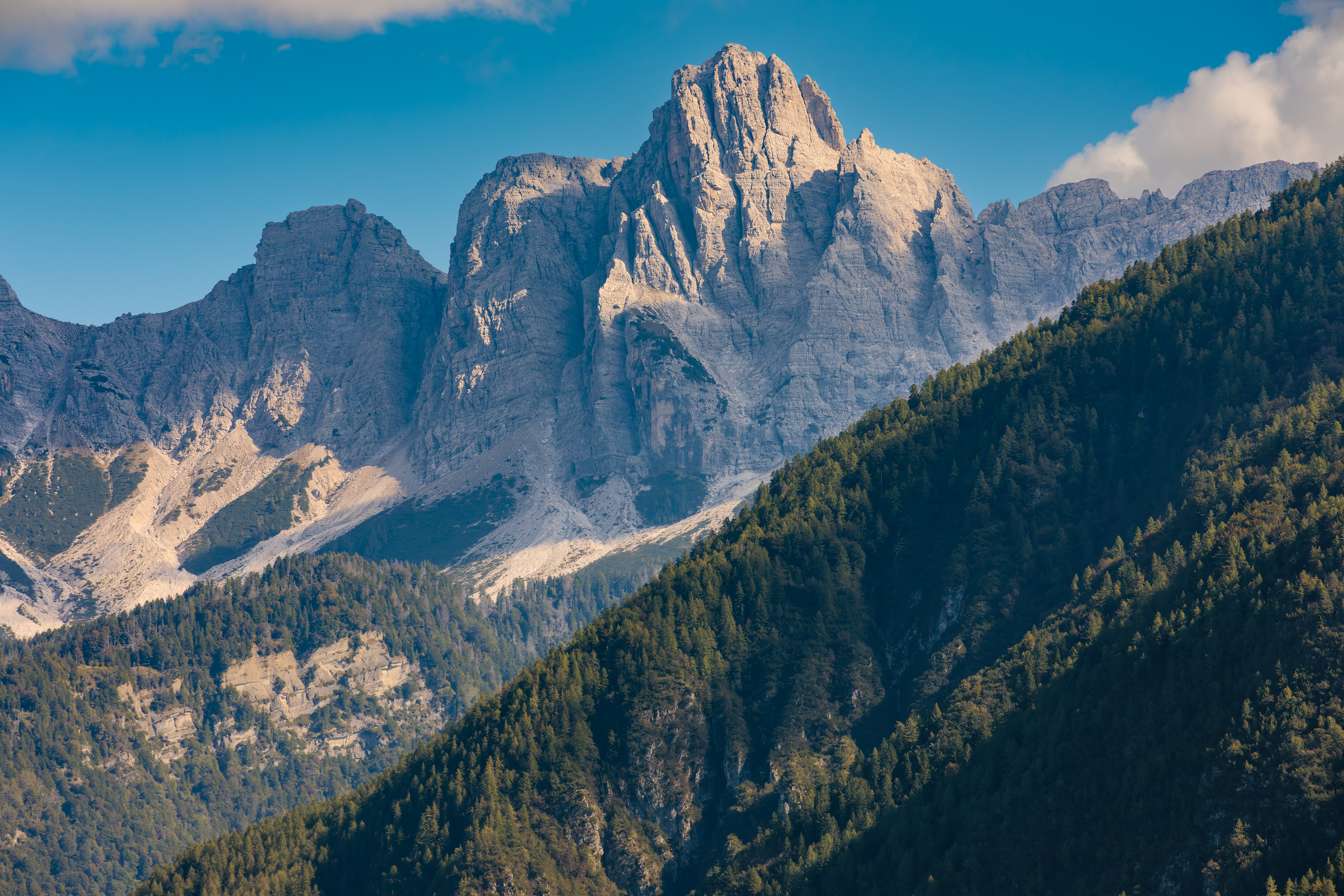

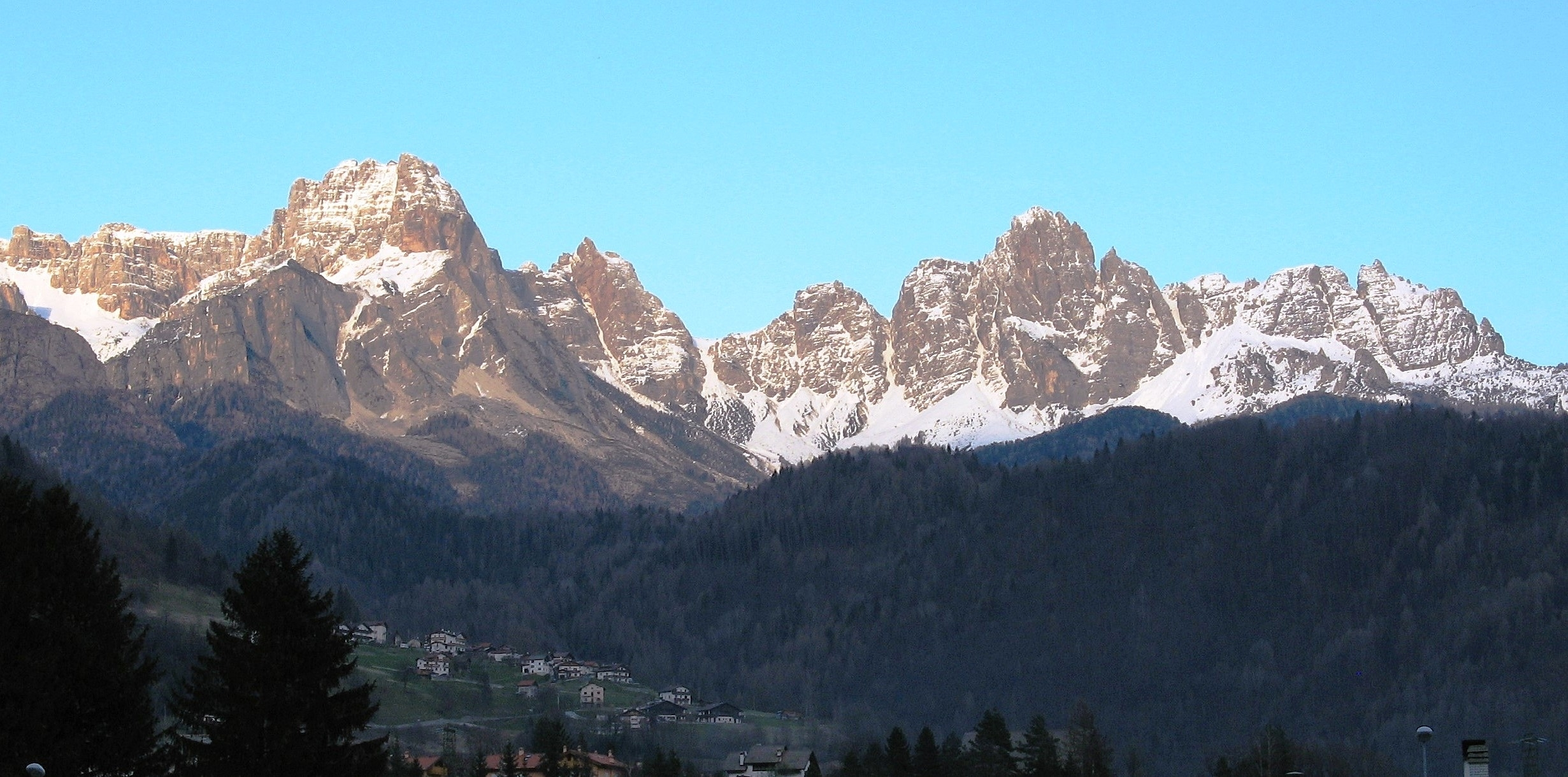
Castello di Moschesin (right) viewed from Agordo.
Monte Tamer to left

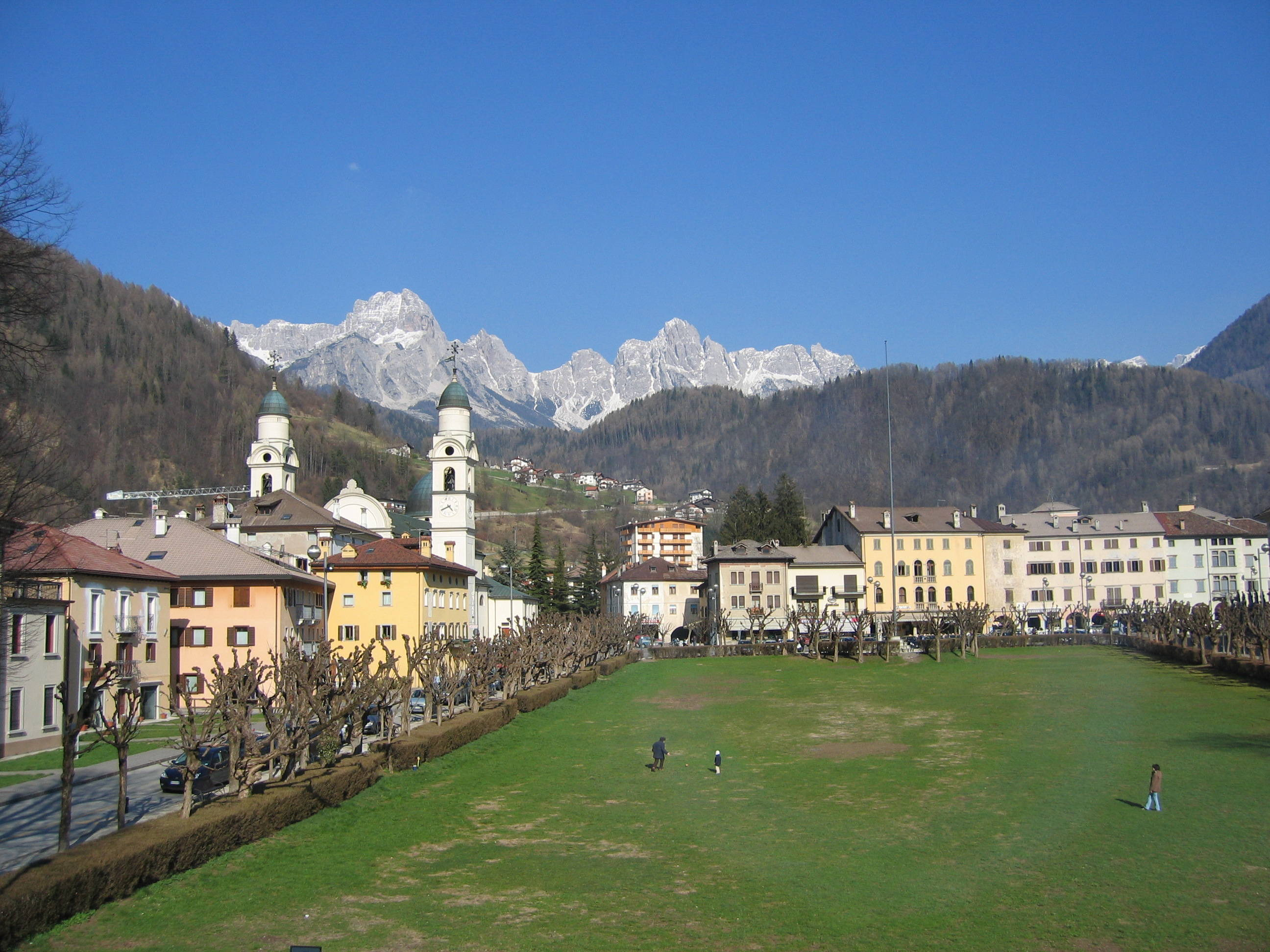
Castello di Moschesin centered on skyline, viewed from Agordo

== See also ==
- Southern Limestone Alps
