= Sass de Mura =

Mountain in Italy

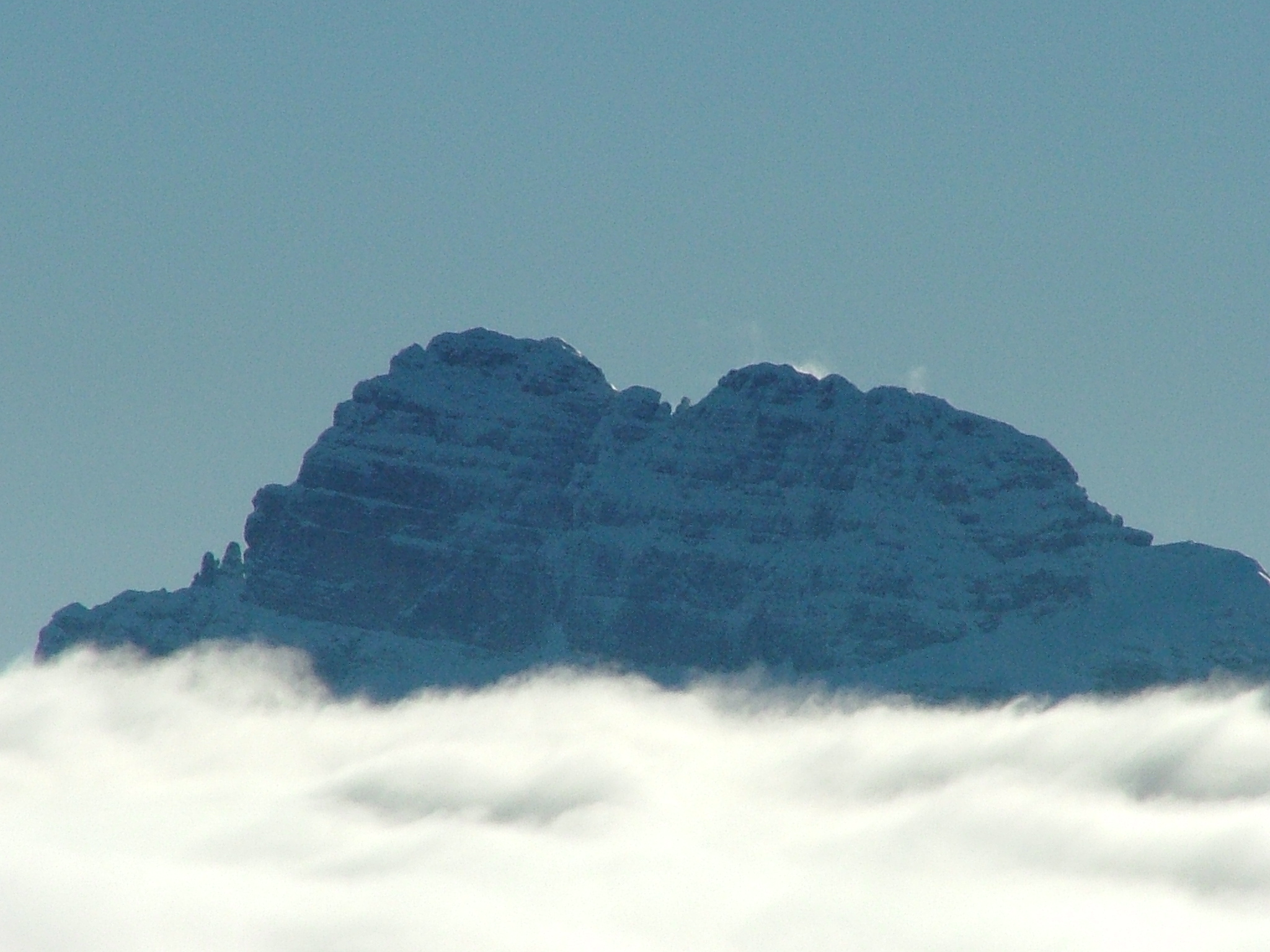
- Sass de Mura

Highest point
- Elevation: 2,547 m (8,356 ft)
- Prominence: 1,178 m (3,865 ft)
- Isolation: 8.24 km (5.12 mi)
- Listing: Alpine mountains 2500-2999 m
- Coordinates: 46°09′49″N 11°55′31″E

Geography
- Location within Italy Location within Alps
- Country: Italy
- Region: Trentino-Alto Adige/Südtirol / Veneto
- Protected area: Dolomiti Bellunesi National Park
- Parent range: Dolomites
- Topo map: Tabacco 22 Pale di San Martino

Geology
- Rock age: Triassic
- Rock type: Dolomite

Sass de Mura is a mountain on the boundary shared by the Trentino-Alto Adige/Südtirol and Veneto regions of northern Italy.

== Description ==
Sass de Mura is a 2,547-metre-elevation (8,356-foot) summit in the Dolomites. Set on the common boundary between the provinces of Belluno and Trentino, the peak is located 20 kilometers (12.4 miles) west of the city of Belluno. The peak is within Dolomiti Bellunesi National Park, a UNESCO World Heritage Site. Precipitation runoff from the mountain's west slope drains to the Cismon, whereas the east slope drains to the Piave. Sass de Mura is the highest peak in the Cimonega Group, and it is 1.38 kilometers (0.86 mile) south of Piz di Sagron, the second-highest.

== Climate ==
Based on the Köppen climate classification, Sass de Mura is located in an alpine climate zone with long, cold winters, and short, mild summers. Weather systems are forced upward by the mountains (orographic lift), causing moisture to drop in the form of rain and snow. The months of June through September offer the most favorable weather for climbing or visiting this area.

== Gallery ==
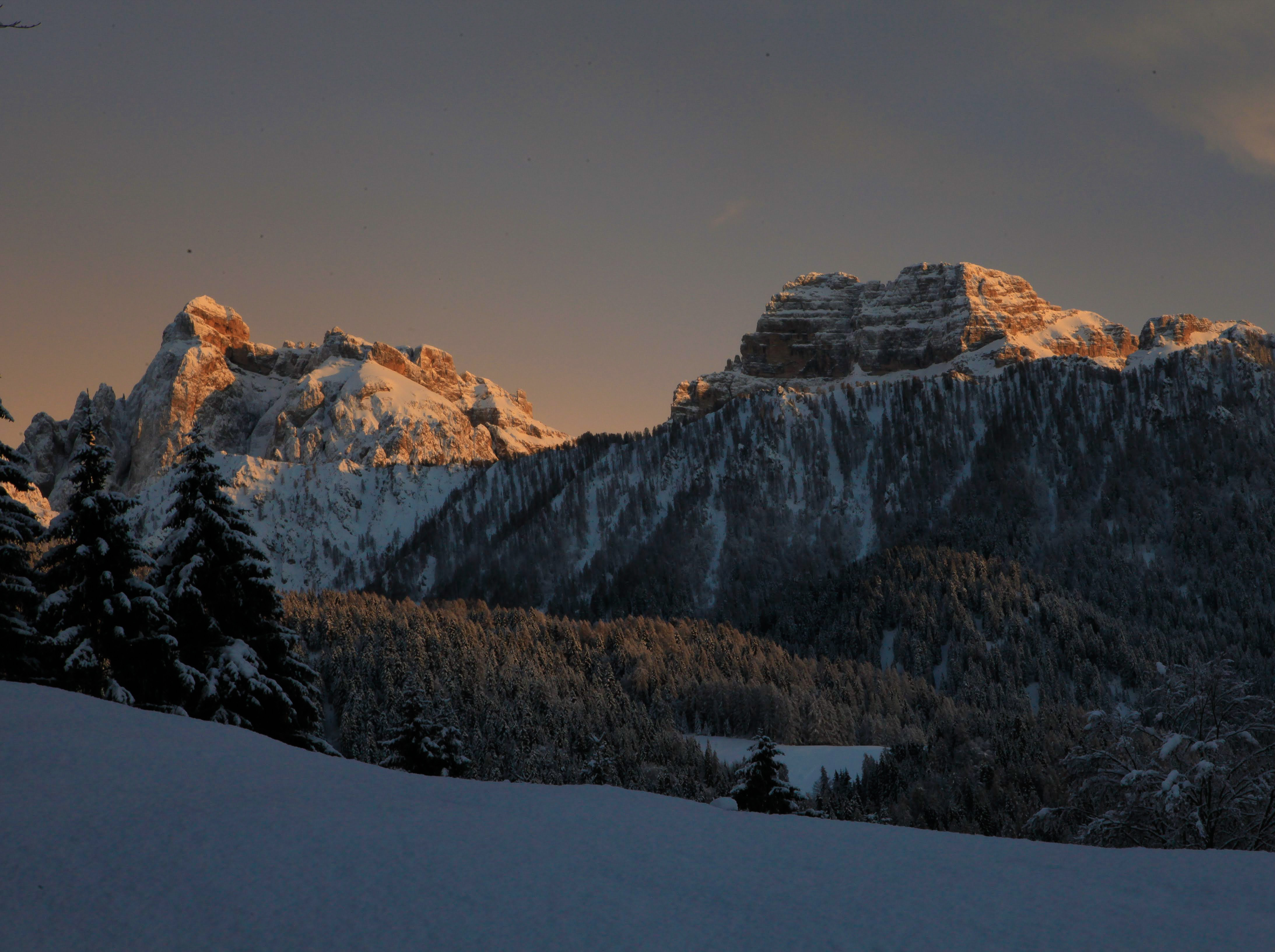
Piz di Sagron (left) and Sass de Mura (right) from southwest

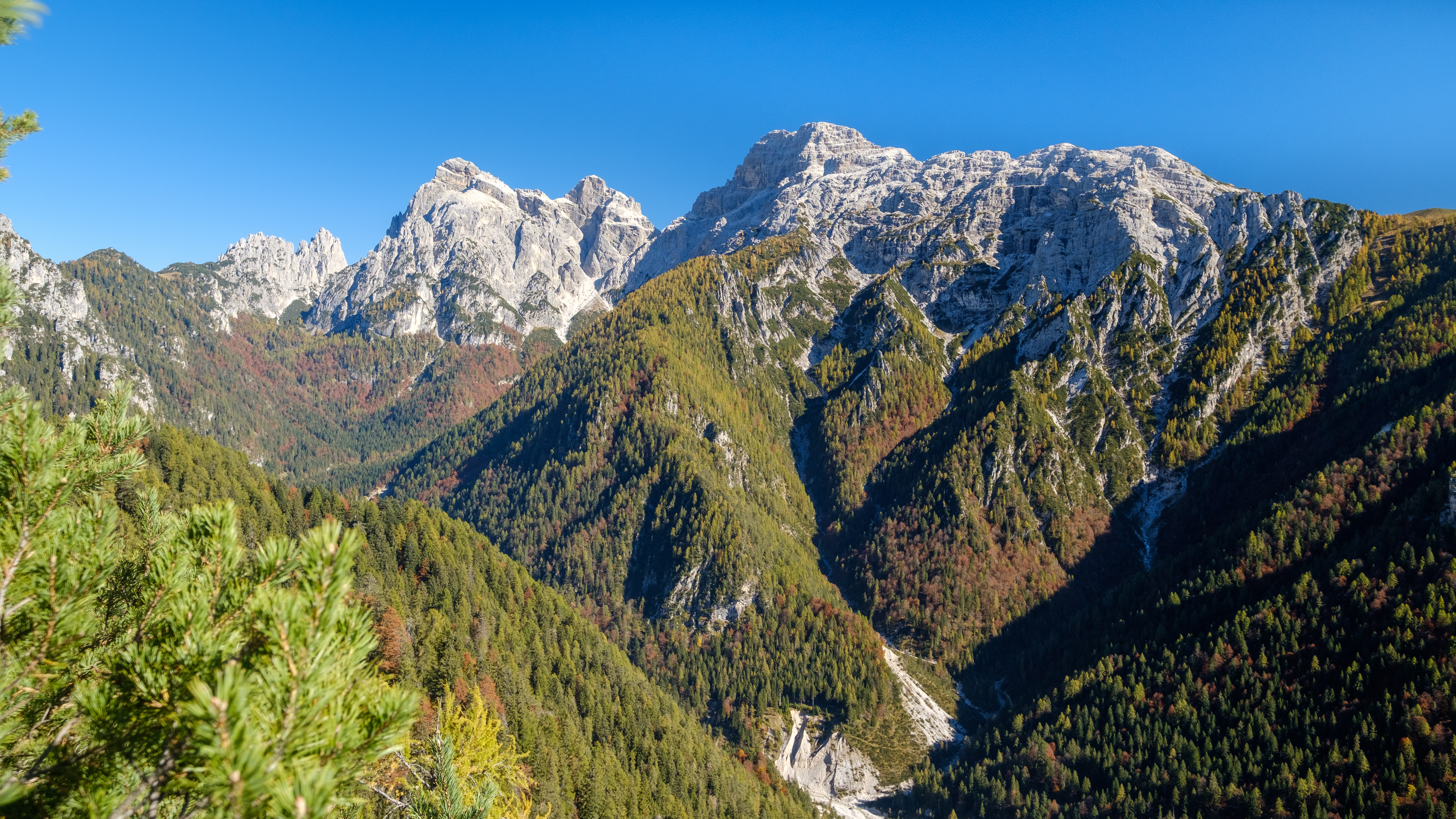
Piz di Sagron and Sass de Mura from southwest

== See also ==
- Southern Limestone Alps
