= Lino De Toni =

Italian ice hockey player

Personal information
- Nationality: Italian
- Born: 18 October 1972 (age 52); Agordo, Italy

Sport
- Sport: Ice hockey

Lino De Toni (born 18 October 1972) is an Italian ice hockey player. He competed in the men's tournament at the 1994 Winter Olympics.
