= Tito Livio Burattini =

Italian inventor, architect and engineer (1617–1681)

- Tytus Liwiusz Burattini
- Burattini's personal coat of arms
- Born: March 8, 1617; Agordo, Domini di Terraferma, Republic of Venice
- Died: November 17, 1681 (aged 64); Kraków, Kraków Voivodeship, Polish–Lithuanian Commonwealth

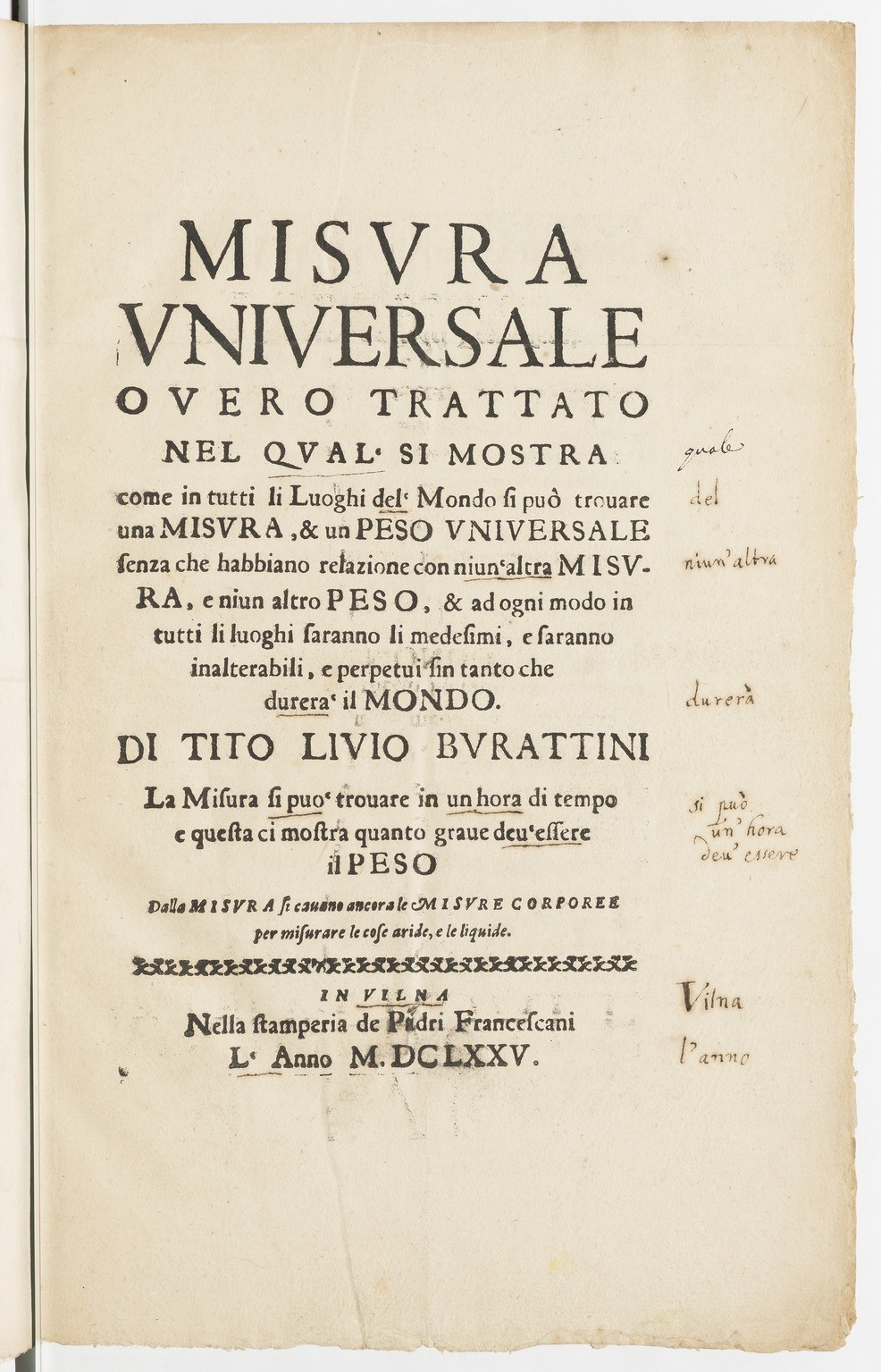
Title page of Misura universale

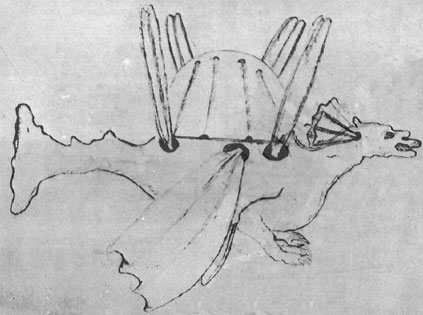
Burattini traveled worldwide, measured various structures, and designed machines like this Dragon Volant (lit. 'Flying Dragon')

Tito Livio Burattini (Polish: Tytus Liwiusz Burattini; 8 March 1617 – 17 November 1681) was an inventor, architect, Egyptologist, scientist, instrument-maker, traveller, engineer and nobleman. He spent his working life in Poland and the Grand Duchy of Lithuania. He was born in Agordo, Republic of Venice, and studied in Padua and Venice. In 1639, he explored the Great Pyramid of Giza with English mathematician John Greaves; both Burattini and Sir Isaac Newton used measurements made by Greaves in an attempt to accurately determine the circumference of the earth.

From the Holy Roman Empire in 1641, the court of King Ladislaus IV invited him to the Polish–Lithuanian Commonwealth. In Warsaw, Burattini built a model aircraft with four fixed glider wings in 1647. Described as "four pairs of wings attached to an elaborate 'dragon'", it was said to have successfully lifted a cat in 1648 but not Burattini himself. According to Clive Hart's The Prehistory of Flight, he promised that "only the most minor injuries" would result from landing the craft.

He later developed an early system of measurement based on time, similar to today's International System of Units; he published it in his book Misura universale (lit. 'universal measure') in 1675 at Vilnius. His system includes the metro cattolico (lit. 'catholic [i.e. universal] metre'), a unit of length equivalent to the length of a free seconds pendulum; it differs from the modern metre by half a centimetre. He is considered the first to recommend the name metre for a unit of length.

Along with two others he met at Kraków, Burattini "performed optical experiments and contributed to the discovery of irregularities on the surface of Venus, comparable to those on the Moon". He made lenses for microscopes and telescopes, and gave some of them to Cardinal Leopoldo de' Medici. He is also credited with building a calculating machine, which he donated to Grand Duke Ferdinando II, that borrows from both a Blaise Pascal machine and Napier's rods. He died in Kraków, aged 64.

== See also ==
- John Wilkins
