= Monte Tamer =

Mountain in Italy

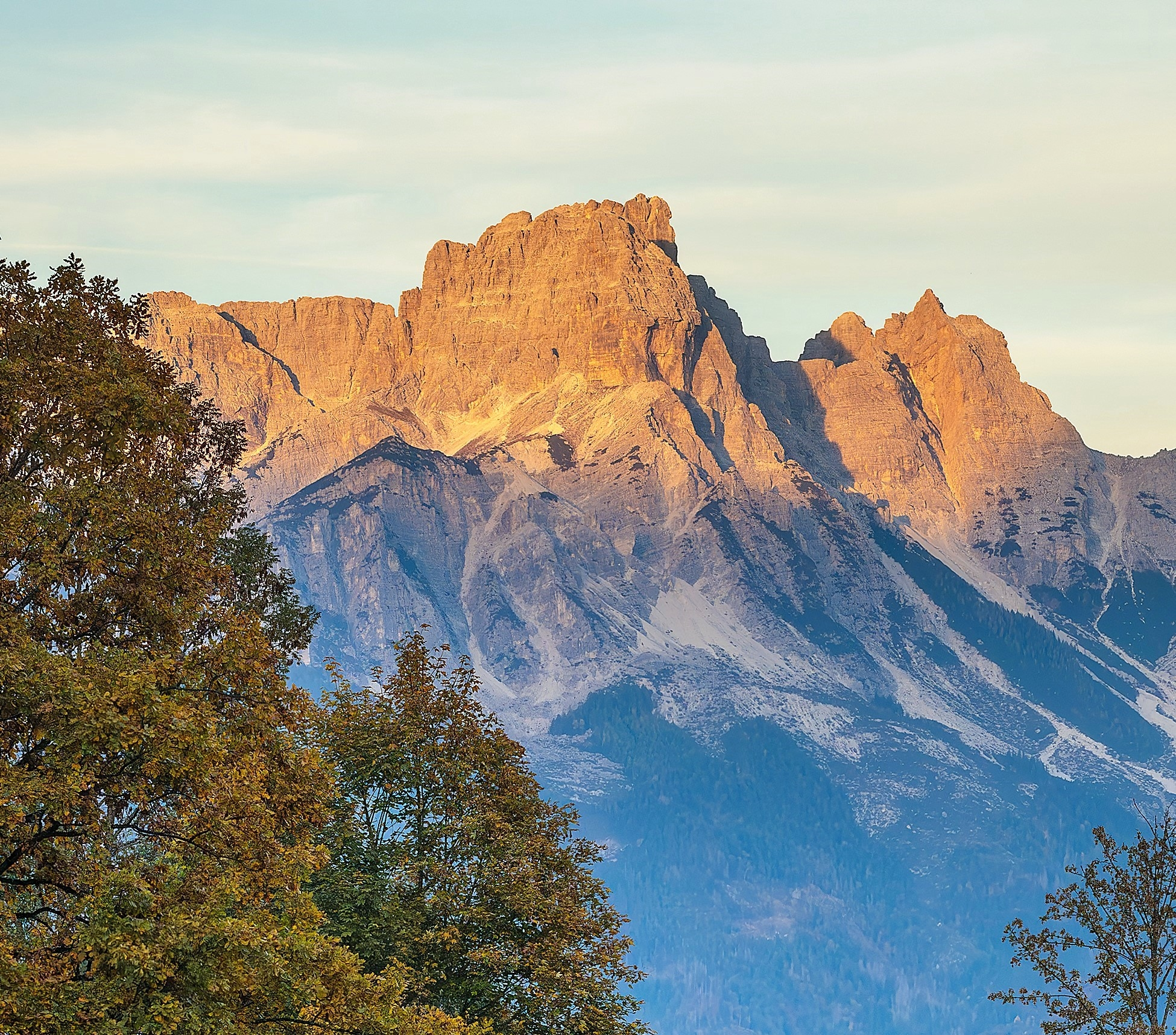
- Southwest aspect at sunset

Highest point
- Elevation: 2,547 m (8,356 ft)
- Prominence: 843 m (2,766 ft)
- Isolation: 4.51 km (2.80 mi)
- Coordinates: 46°18′39″N 12°07′19″E

Geography
- Location within Italy
- Country: Italy
- Province: Belluno
- Protected area: UNESCO World Heritage site
- Parent range: Dolomites
- Topo map(s): Tabacco 025 – Dolomites of Zoldo, Cadore and Agordine

Geology
- Rock age: Triassic
- Rock type: Dolomite

Climbing
- First ascent: 1885

Monte Tamer is a mountain in the province of Belluno in northern Italy.

== Description ==
Monte Tamer is a 2,547-meter-elevation (8,356-foot) summit in the Dolomites which are a UNESCO World Heritage site. Set in the Veneto region, the mountain is located seven kilometers (4.35 miles) northeast of the town of Agordo. Precipitation runoff from the mountain's slopes drains into tributaries of the Piave. Topographic relief is significant as the summit rises 950 meters (3,117 feet) along the south slope in approximately one kilometer (0.6 mile), and 950 meters (3,117 feet) along the west slope in 1.25 kilometers (0.78 mile). The nearest higher neighbor is Monte Moiazza Sud, 4.51 kilometers (2.8 miles) to the west-northwest.

== Climbing ==
First known ascents of the three principal summits:

- Tàmer Grande (2,547 m) – 1885 – A. Betti (IGM topographer) via west face.
- Tàmer Davanti (2,496 m) – September 11, 1892 – Michele Bettega, Eugenio Conedera, Tommaso Dal Col, Demeter Diamantidi, Jeanne Immink, Cesare Tomè, Eugen Zander, Giuseppe Zecchini. Via northeast face and the north ridge.
- Tàmer Piccolo (2,550 m) – October 14, 1893 – Eugenio Conedera, Cesare Tomè. Via the east face.

The first ascent of all three summits was made on July 5, 1907, by Arturo Andreotti, A. Gregori, and Luigi Favretti.

== Climate ==
Based on the Köppen climate classification, Monte Tamer is located in an alpine climate zone with long, cold winters, and short, mild summers. Weather systems are forced upwards by the mountains (orographic lift), causing moisture to drop in the form of rain and snow. The months of May through October offer the most favorable weather for visiting or climbing this mountain.

== Gallery ==
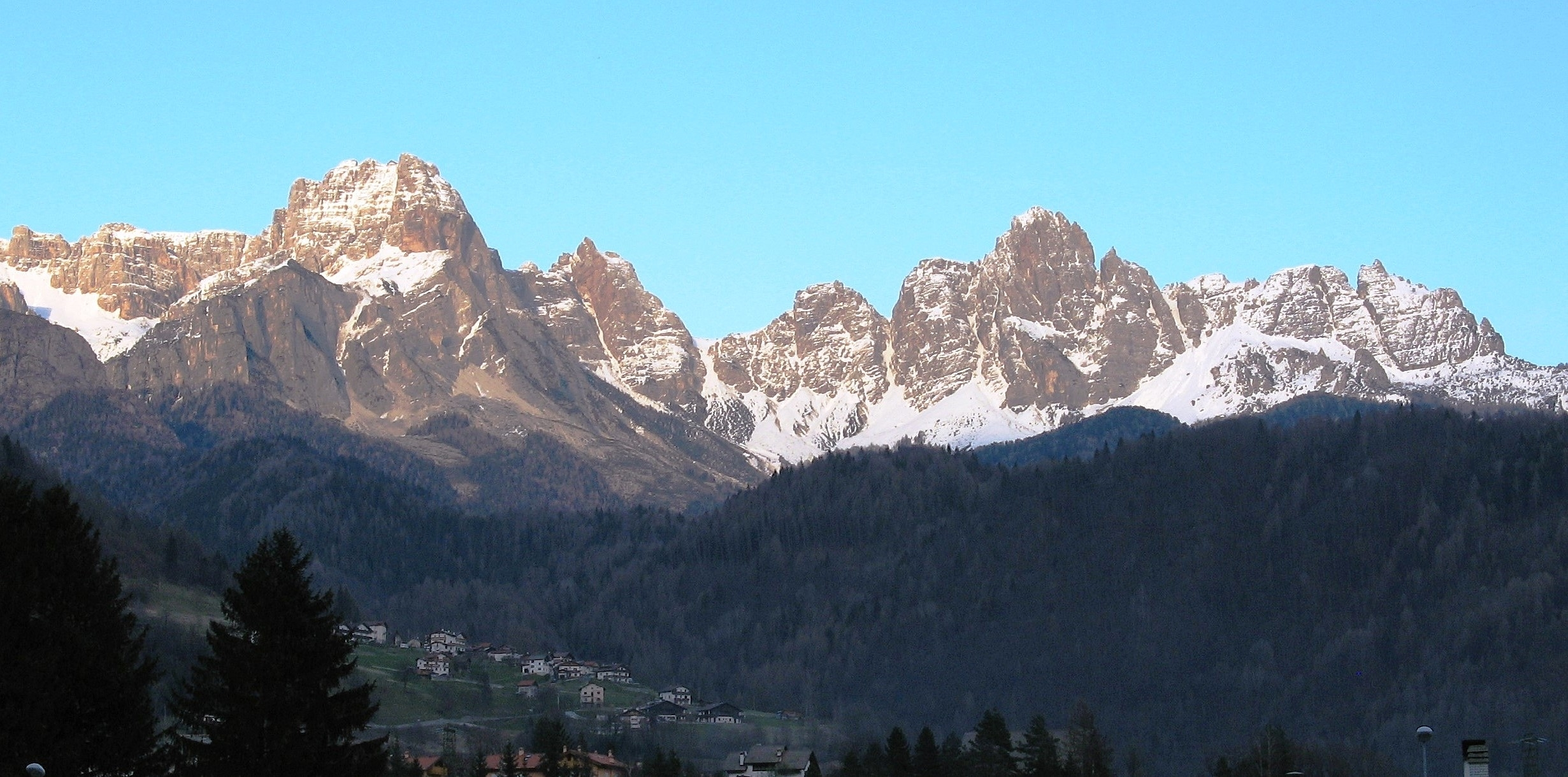
Monte Tamer to left, Castello di Moschesin (right)

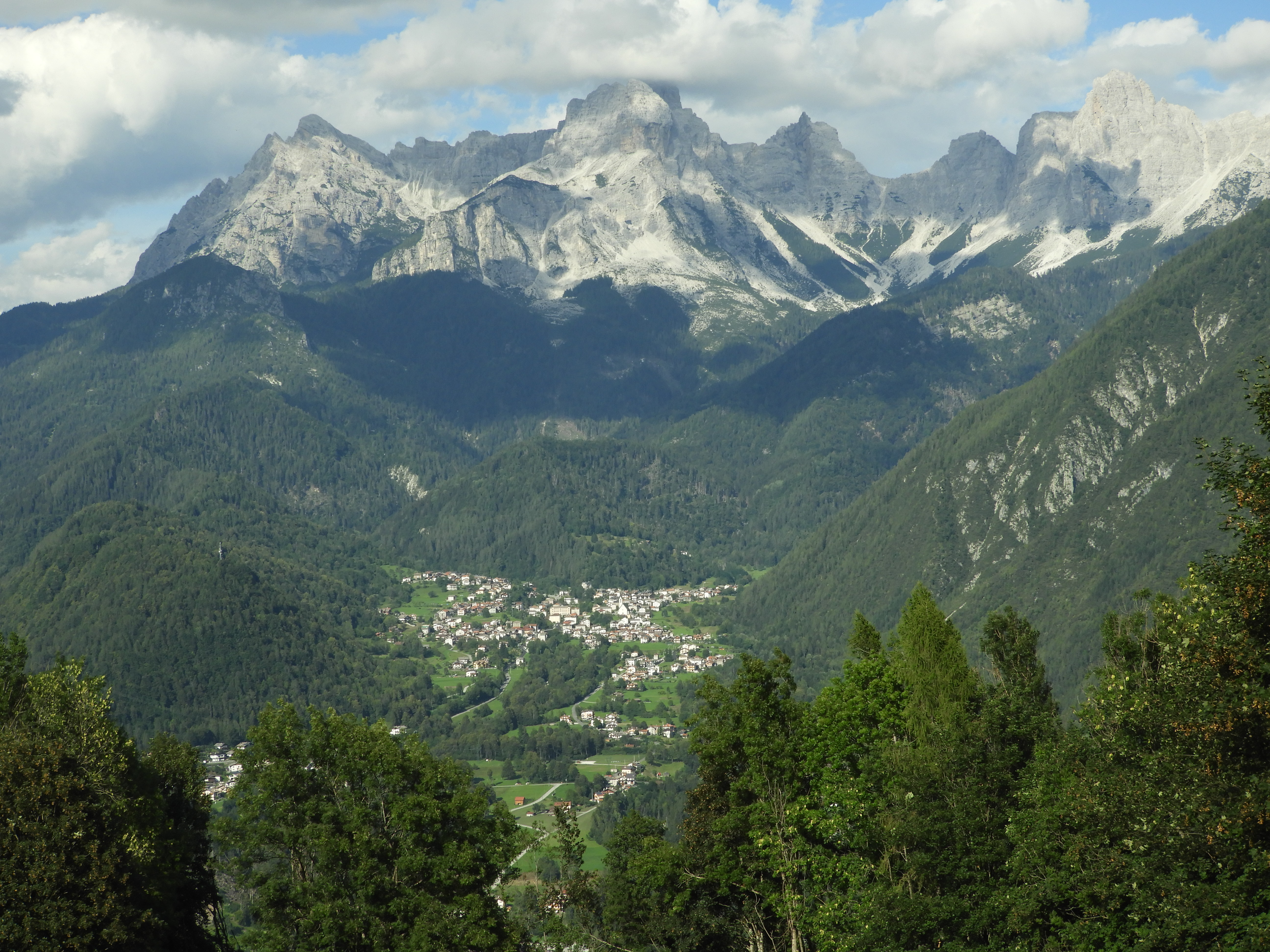

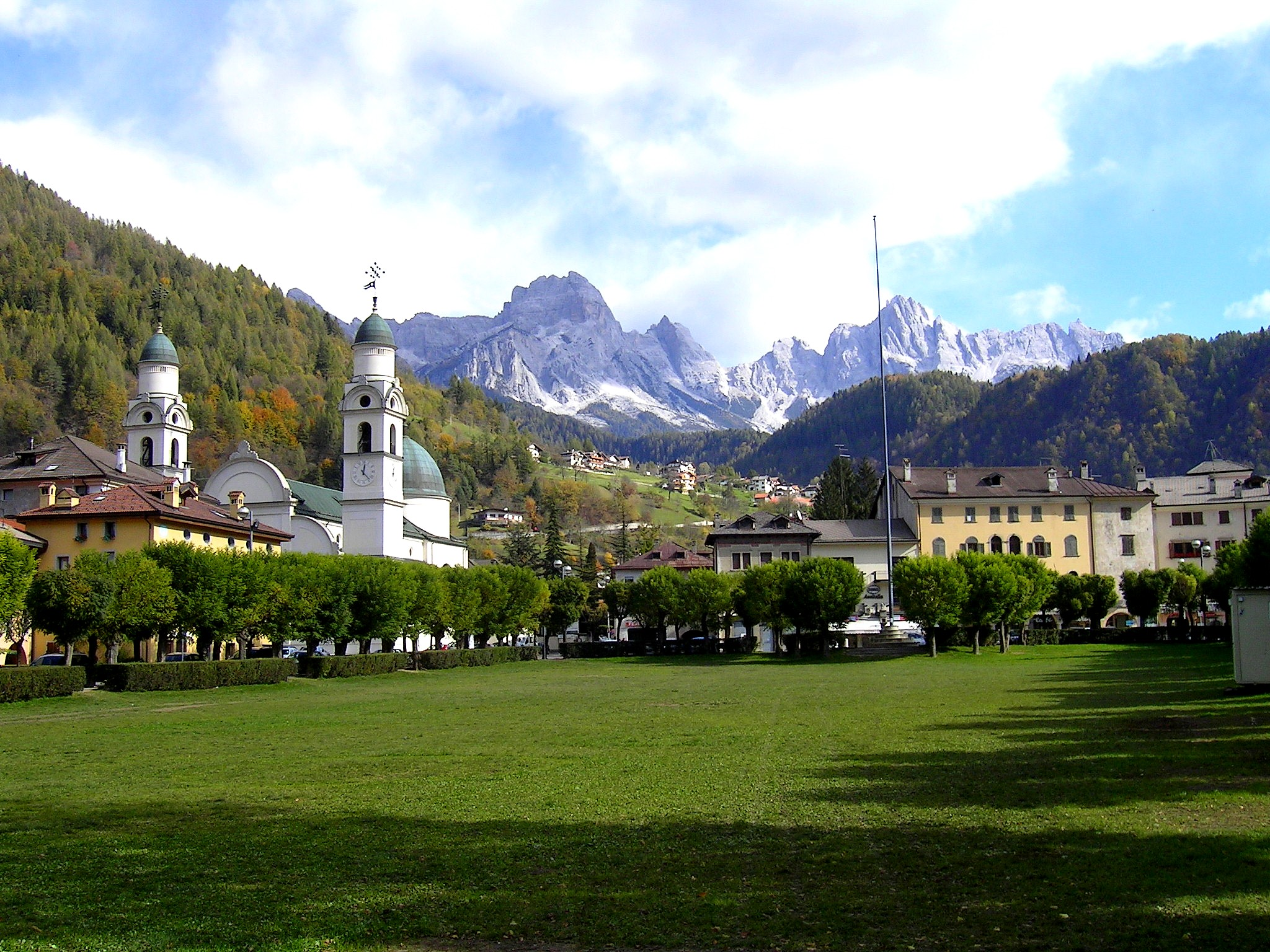
Monte Tamer viewed from Agordo

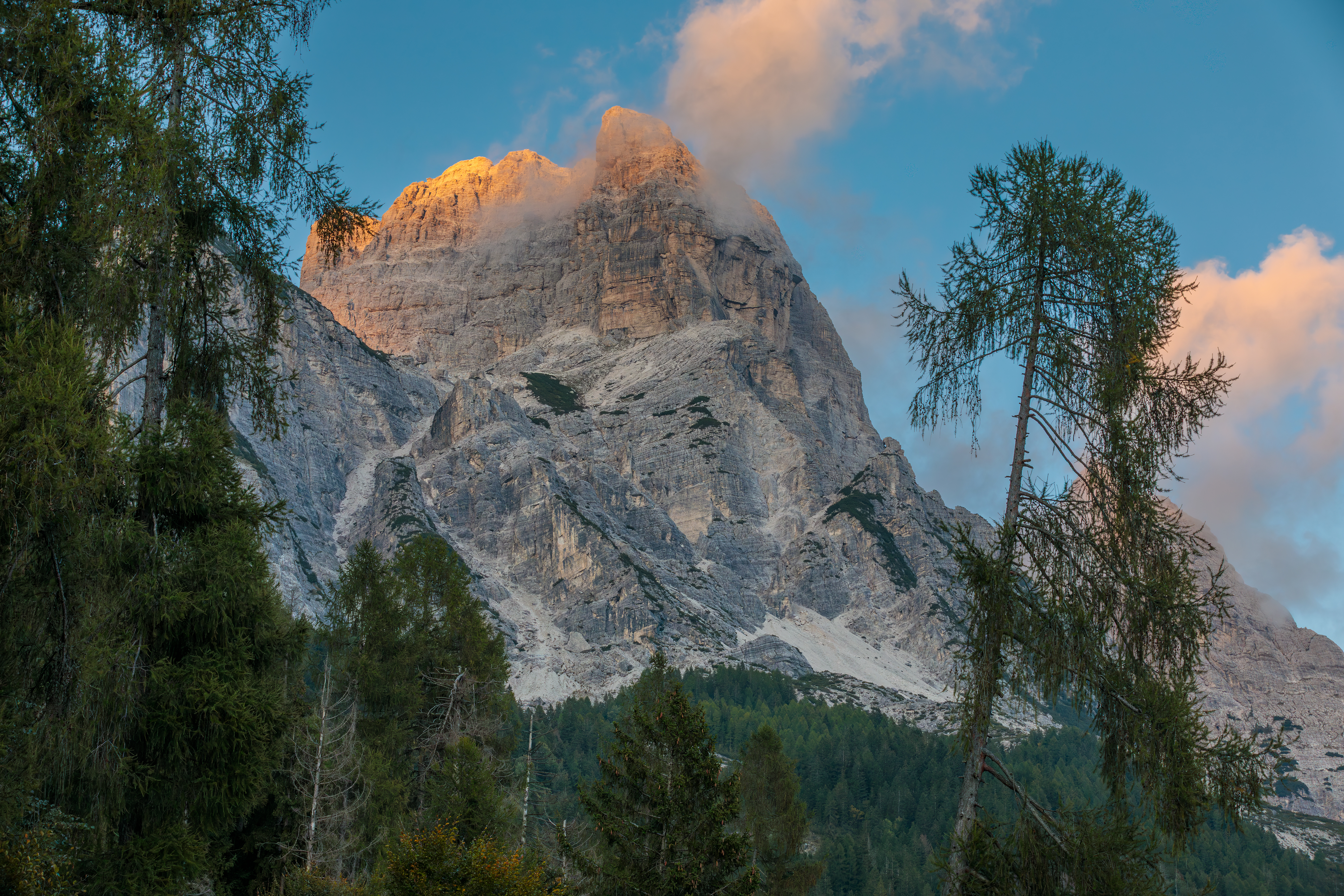
Tamer Davanti and Tamer Grande from southwest

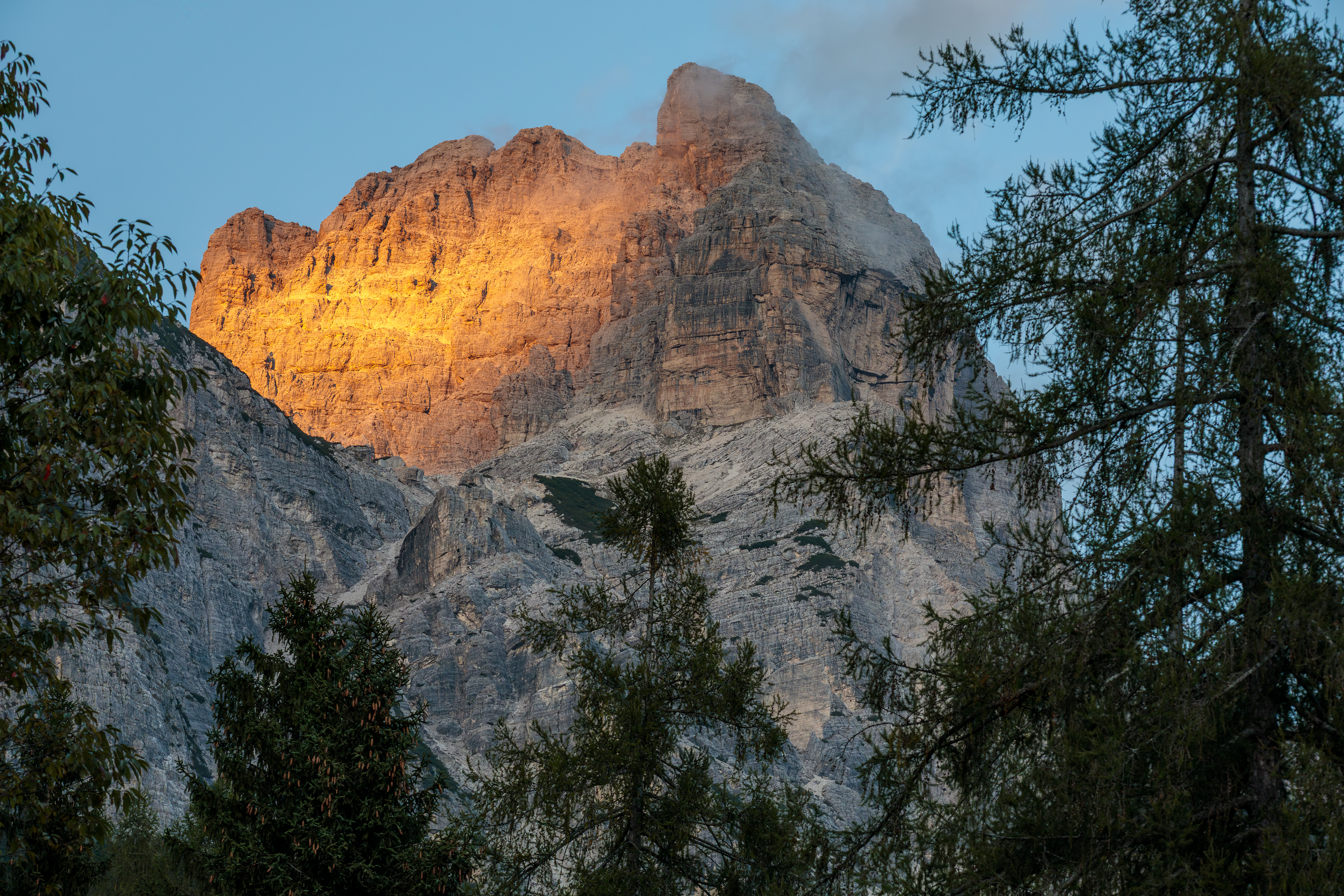
Tamer Davanti and Tamer Grande from southwest

== See also ==
- Southern Limestone Alps
