= Nadia De Nardin =

Italian ice hockey player

Personal information
- Nationality: Italian
- Born: 14 November 1975 (age 49); Agordo, Italy

Sport
- Sport: Ice hockey

Nadia De Nardin (born 14 November 1975) is an Italian ice hockey player. She competed in the women's tournament at the 2006 Winter Olympics.
