= Piz di Sagron =

Mountain in Italy

- Piz de Sagron
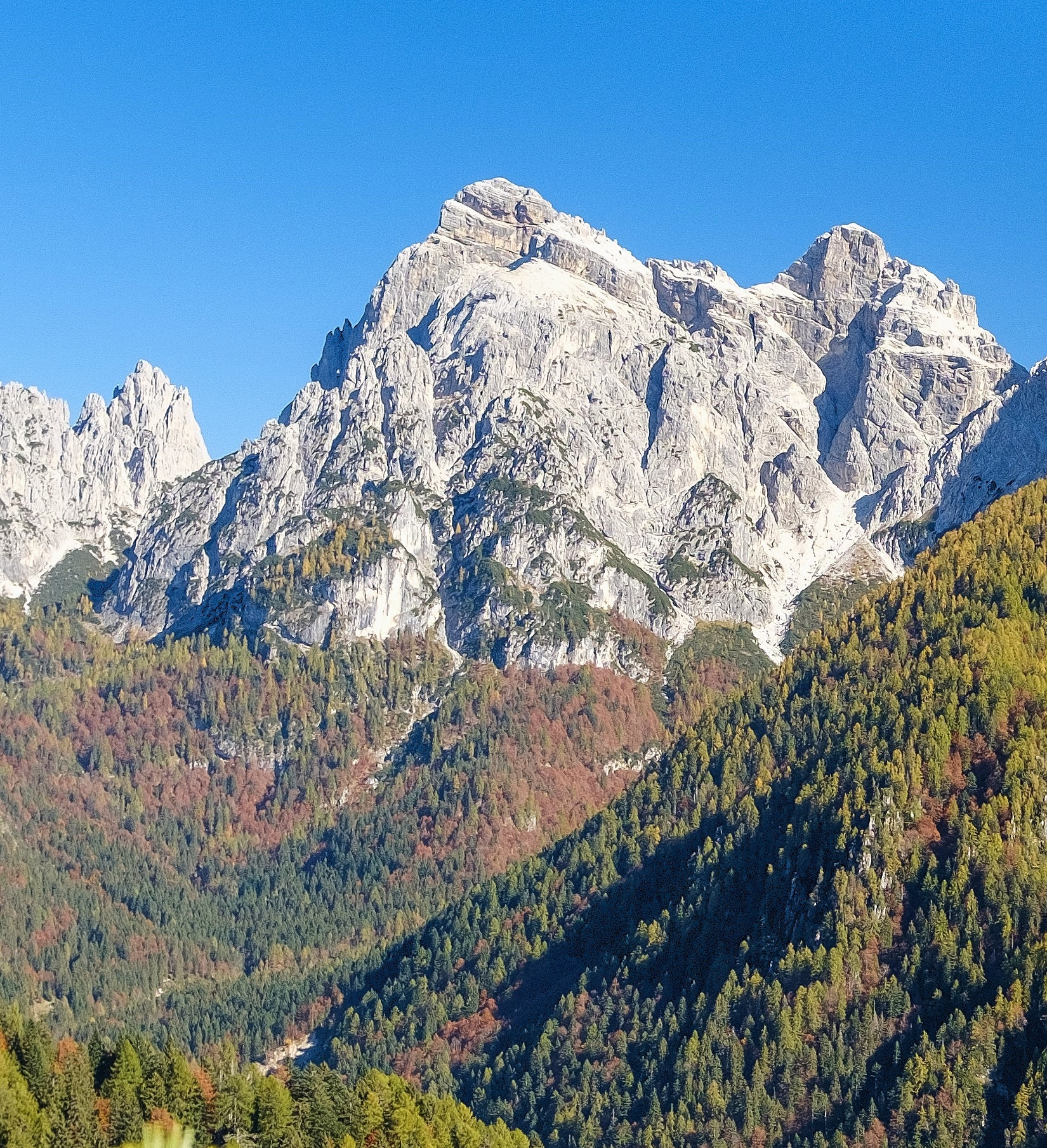
- Southwest aspect

Highest point
- Elevation: 2,486 m (8,156 ft)
- Prominence: 349 m (1,145 ft)
- Parent peak: Sass de Mura
- Isolation: 1.38 km (0.86 mi)
- Coordinates: 46°10′33″N 11°55′42″E

Naming
- Etymology: Peak of Sagron

Geography
- Location within Italy
- Country: Italy
- Region: Trentino-Alto Adige/Südtirol / Veneto
- Protected area: Dolomiti Bellunesi National Park
- Parent range: Dolomites
- Topo map: Tabacco 22 Pale di San Martino

Geology
- Rock age: Triassic
- Rock type: Dolomite

Piz di Sagron is a mountain on the boundary shared by the Trentino-Alto Adige/Südtirol and Veneto regions of northern Italy.

== Description ==
Piz di Sagron is a 2,486-meter-elevation (8,156-foot) summit in the Dolomites. Set on the common boundary between the provinces of Belluno and Trentino, the peak is located 20 kilometers (12.4 miles) west of the city of Belluno and two kilometers (1.24 miles) south-southwest of the municipality of Sagron. The mountain's toponym translates as "Peak of Sagron." The peak is within Dolomiti Bellunesi National Park, a UNESCO World Heritage Site. Precipitation runoff from the mountain's west slope drains into Torrente Noana which is a tributary of the Cismon, whereas the other slopes drain into tributaries of the Piave. Topographic relief is significant as the summit rises 1,080 meters (3,543 feet) along the west slope in 1.5 kilometers (0.93 mile), and 1,080 meters above the northeast slope in one kilometer (0.6 mile). The nearest higher neighbor is Sass de Mura, 1.38 kilometers (0.86 mile) to the south. Piz di Sagron is the second-highest peak in the Cimonega Group after Sass de Mura.

== Climate ==
Based on the Köppen climate classification, Piz di Sagron is located in an alpine climate zone with long, cold winters, and short, mild summers. Weather systems are forced upward by the mountains (orographic lift), causing moisture to drop in the form of rain and snow. The months of June through September offer the most favorable weather for climbing or visiting this area.

== Gallery ==
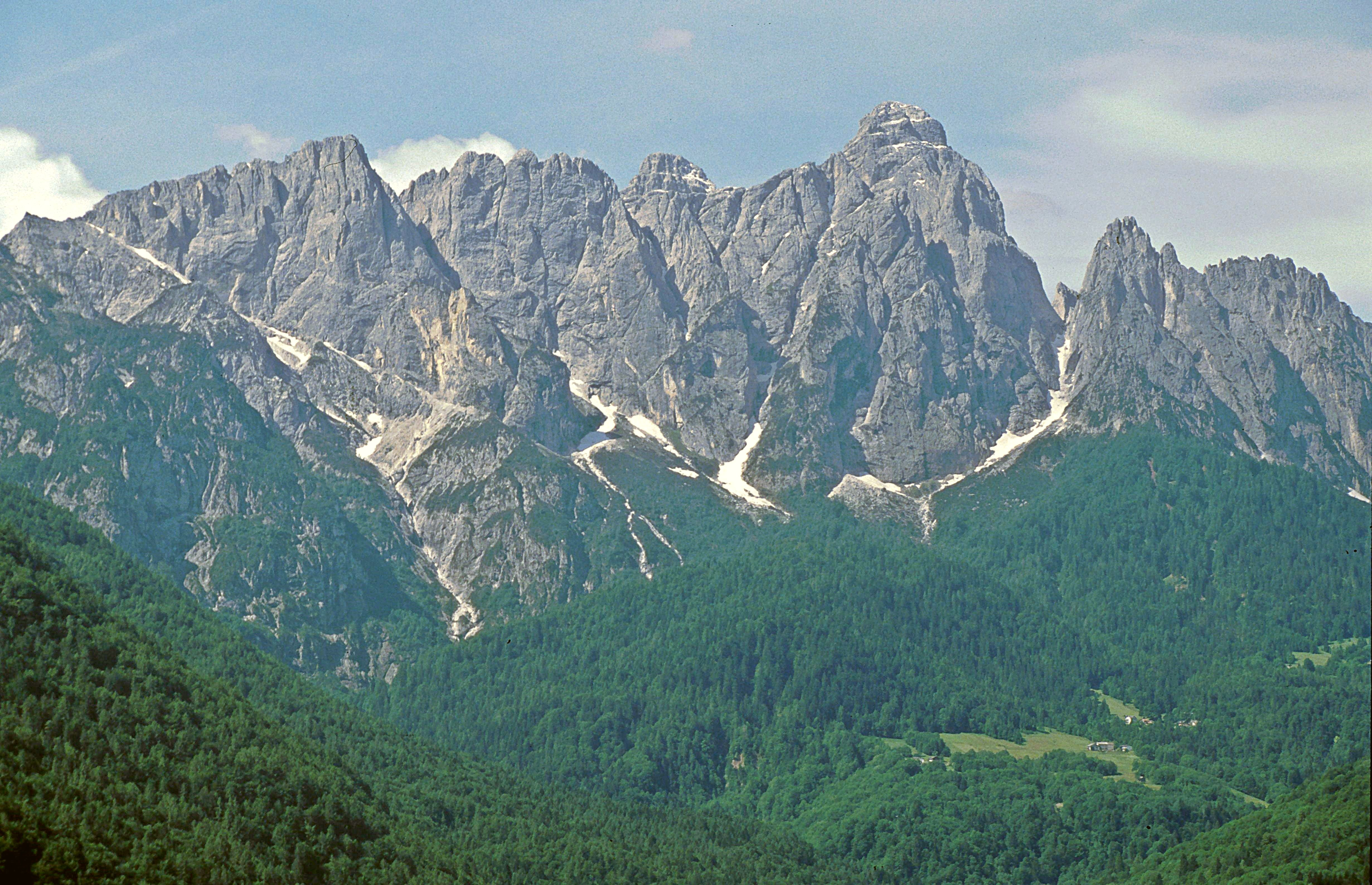
Piz di Sagron (right of center) from northeast

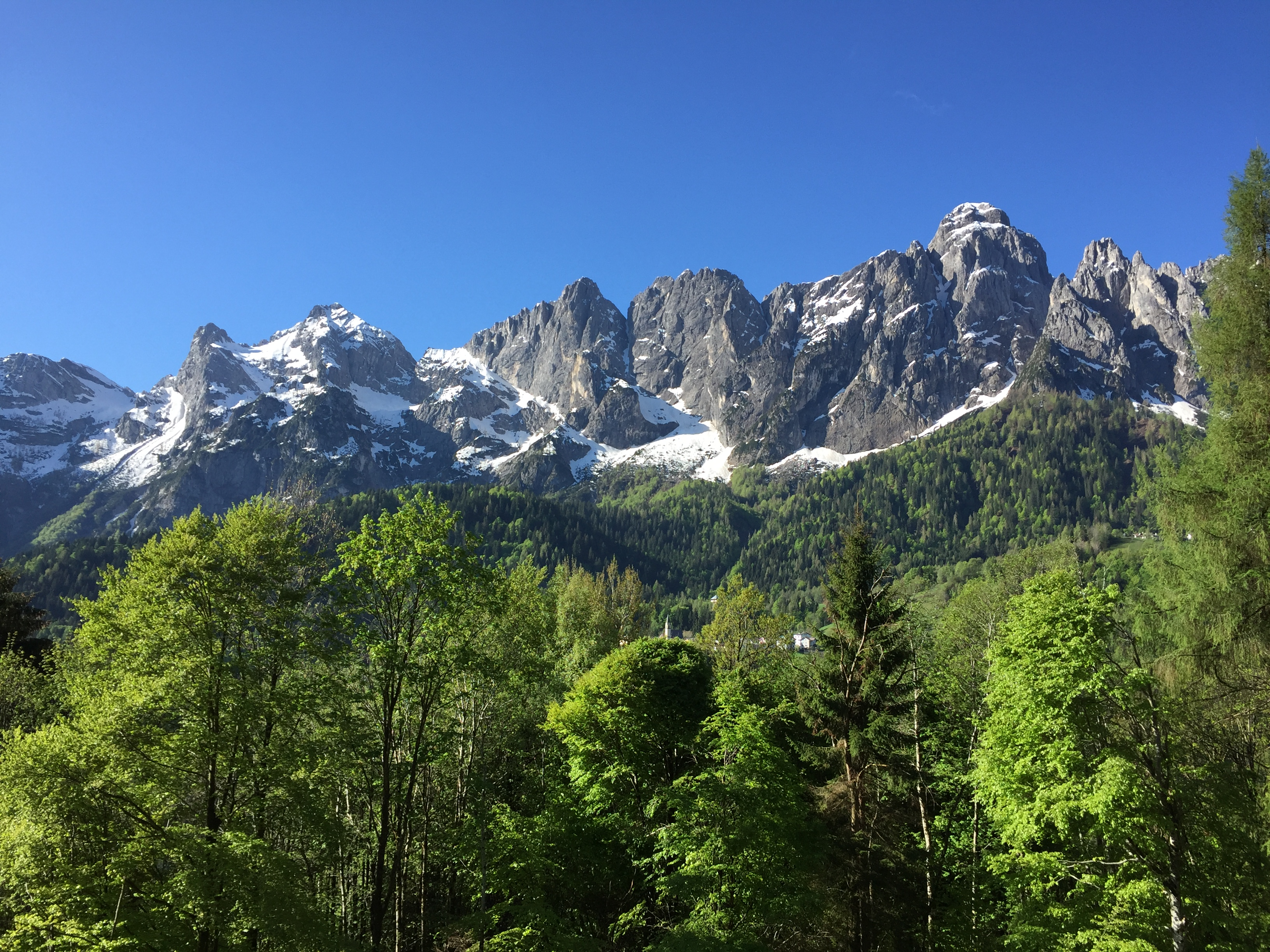
Piz di Sagron (right) from north

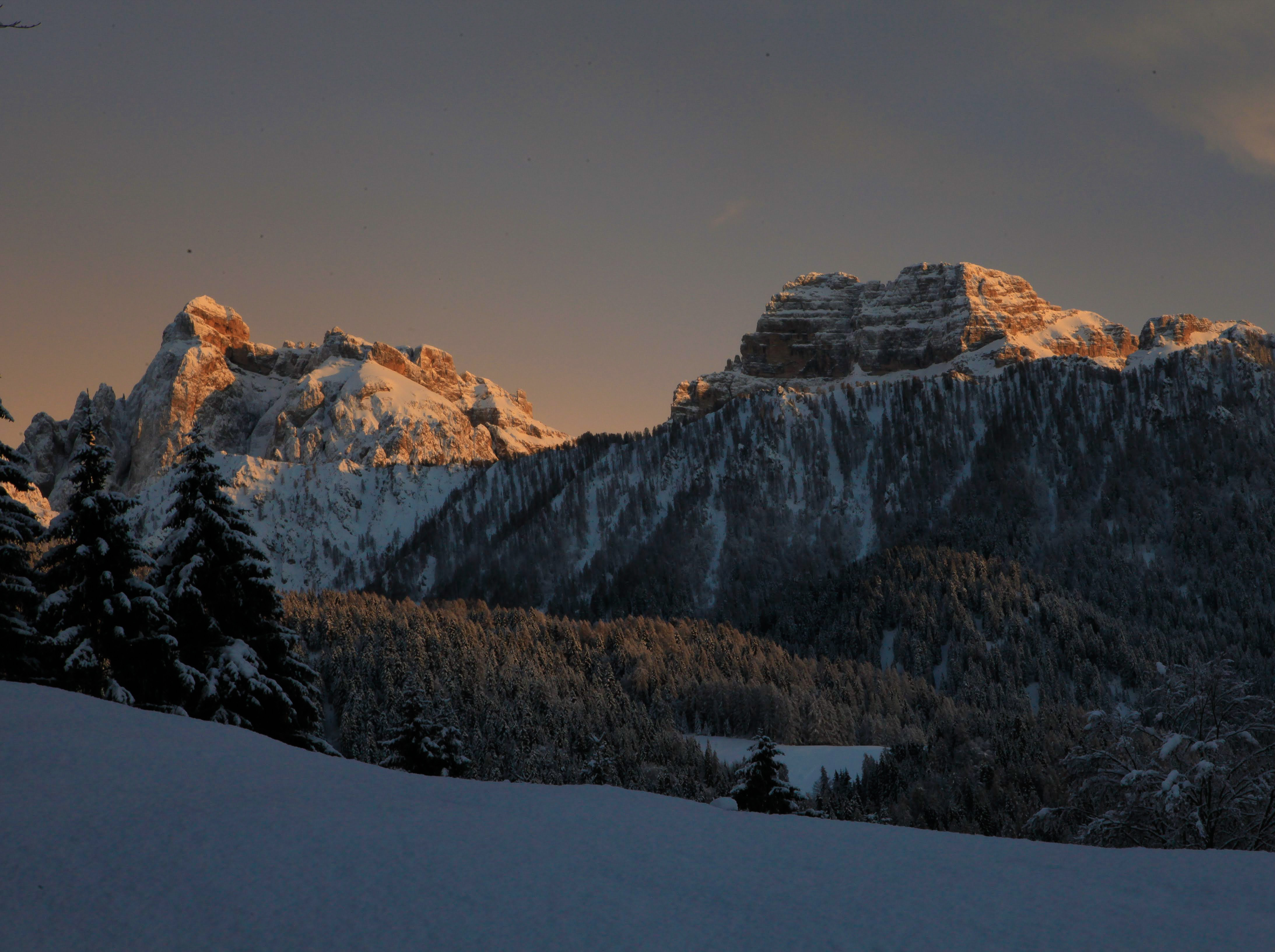
Piz di Sagron (left) and Sass de Mura (right) from southwest

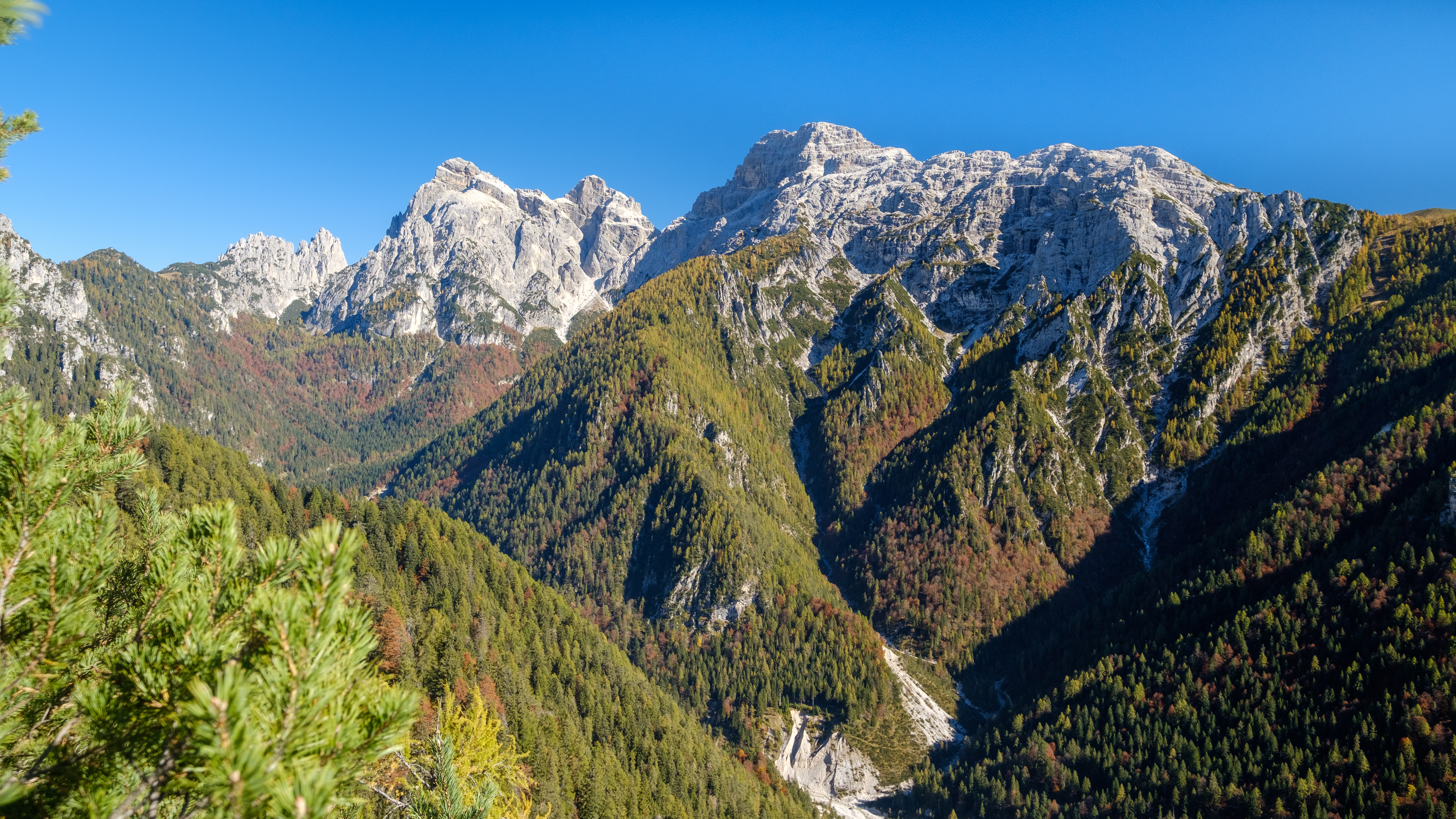
Piz di Sagron and Sass de Mura from southwest

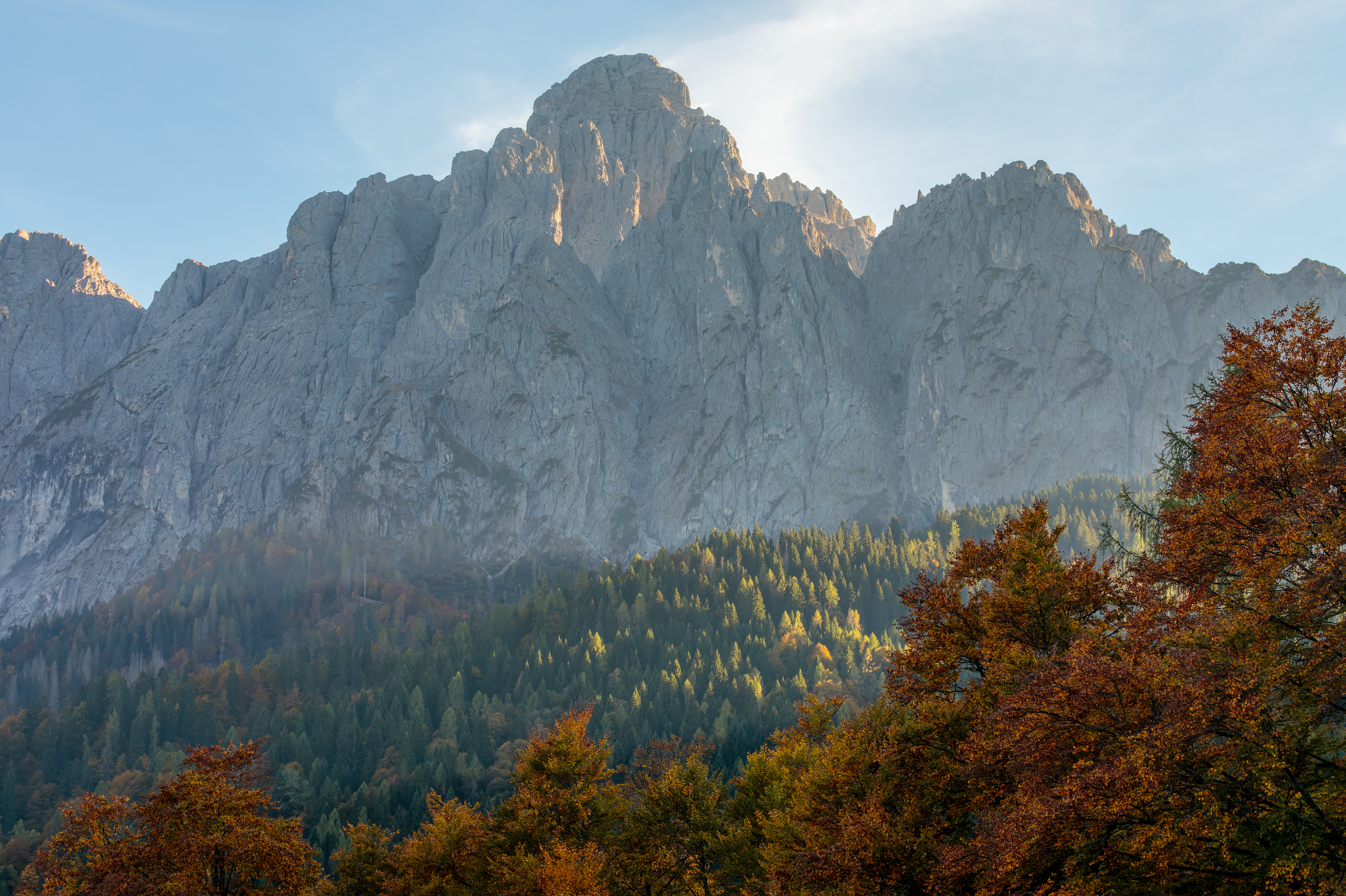

== See also ==
- Southern Limestone Alps
