= Manuela Friz =

Italian ice hockey player

Personal information
- Nationality: Italian
- Born: 16 August 1978 (age 46); Agordo, Italy

Sport
- Sport: Ice hockey

Manuela Friz (born 16 August 1978) is an Italian ice hockey player. She competed in the women's tournament at the 2006 Winter Olympics.
