= Dolomiti Bellunesi National Park =

- Parco nazionale delle Dolomiti Bellunesi
- IUCN category II (national park)
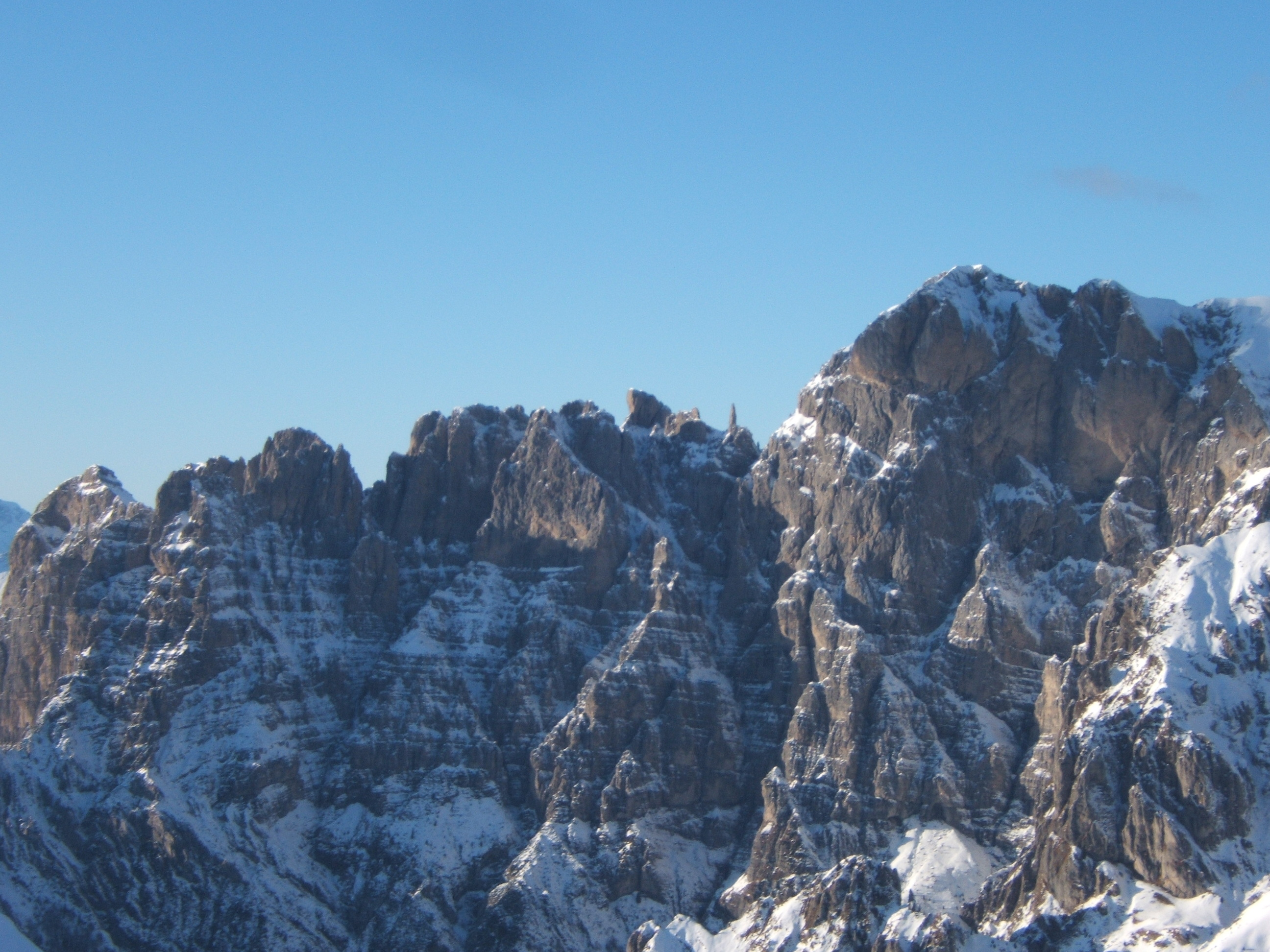

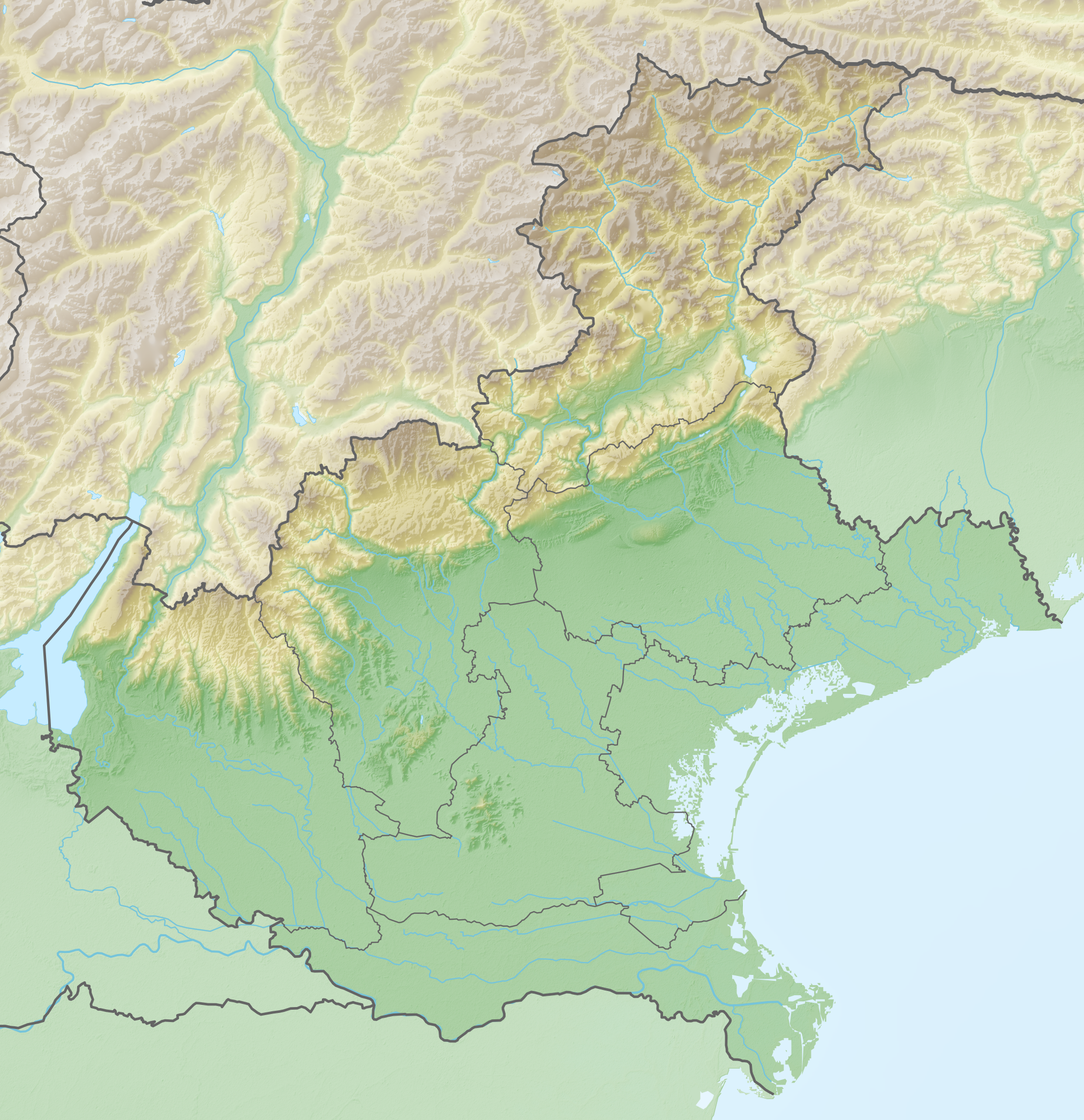
- Location within Veneto Location within Italy
- Location: Province of Belluno, Veneto, Italy
- Nearest city: Belluno and Feltre
- Coordinates: 46°18′N 12°04′E
- Area: 32 square kilometres (12 mi^{2})
- Designation: 1988
- Authorized: 1990
- Established: 1993
- Website: www.dolomitipark.it/Eindex.php

UNESCO World Heritage Site
- Part of: "Pale di San Martino San Lucano – Dolomiti Bellunesi – Vette Feltrine" part of The Dolomites
- Criteria: Natural: (vii)(viii)
- Reference: 1237rev-003
- Inscription: 2009 (33rd Session)

The Dolomiti Bellunesi National Park (Italian: Parco nazionale delle Dolomiti Bellunesi) is a national park in the province of Belluno, Veneto, in the northern Italy.

Established in 1988, the national park is included in the section "Pale di San Martino - San Lucano - Dolomiti Bellunesi - Vette Feltrine" of the Dolomites declared World Heritage Site by UNESCO in 2009.

== History ==
In 1988 it was planned to create the Dolomiti Bellunesi national park, that was officially established in 1990 by the Ministry of the Environment, which identified the aims of the national park:

1. to protect the natural, historical, landscape and environmental values, preserving bio-genetic values of the flora, fauna and geomorphology;
2. to improve the life conditions of the population;
3. to promote scientific research and environmental education through the naturalistic culture;
4. to safeguard agricultural, forest, and breeding activities.

== Territory ==
Dolomiti Bellunesi National Park has an area of 32 square kilometres (12 mi^{2}), entirely included in the province of Belluno, between the Cismon river and the Piave river, the Maè valley and the Agordo valley.

=== Mountain ranges ===
The national park includes mountain ranges of Alpi Feltrine (Vette di Feltre, Cimonega, Pizzocco, Brendol, Agnelezze), Monti del Sole, Schiara, Talvena, Prampèr and Spiz di Mezzodì. There are high-altitude areas, karst rocks and debris slopes, ideal habitat for high-mountain species.

=== Rivers and streams ===
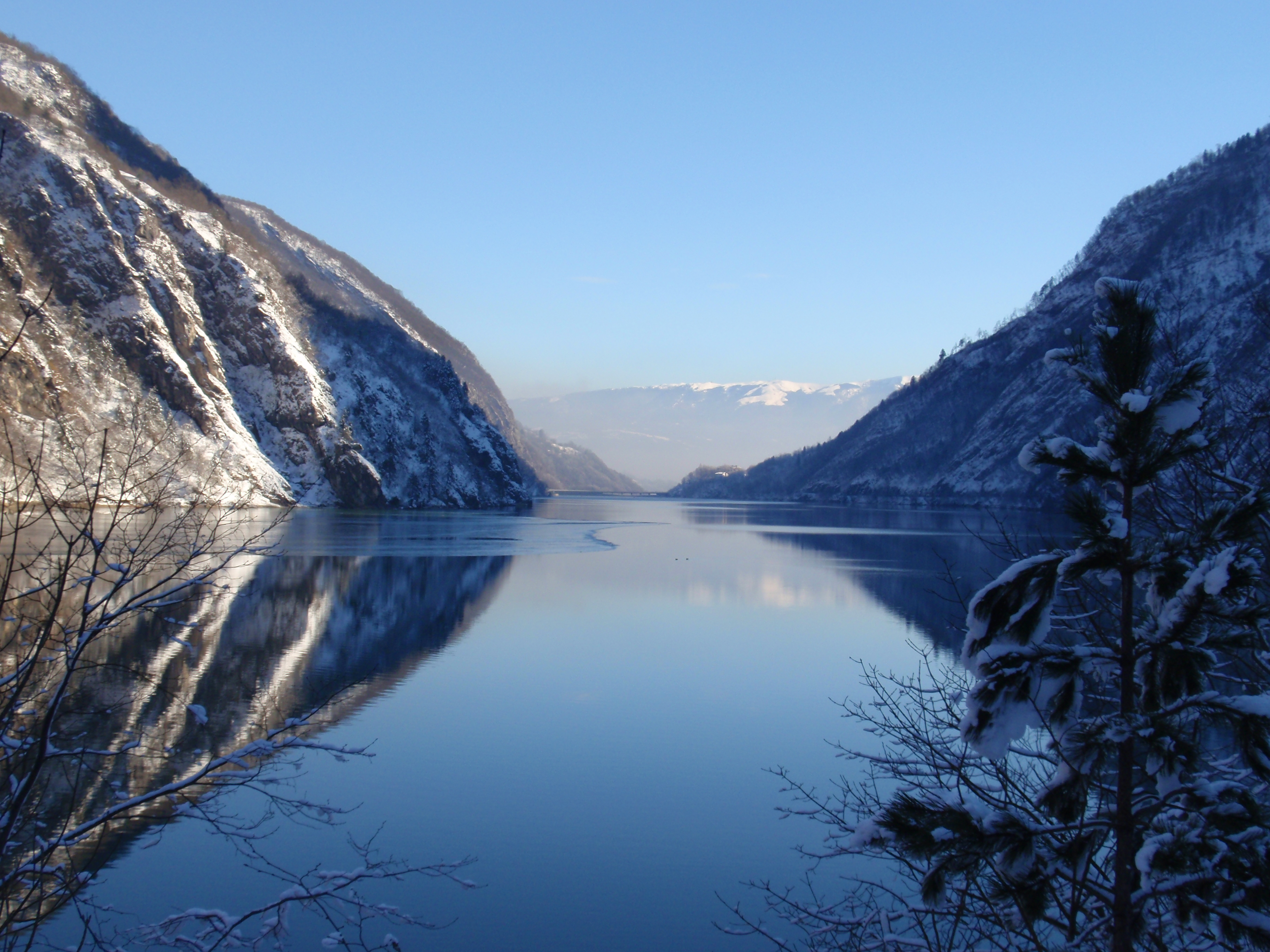
Lago del Mis, winter

The territory of the national park, except for some high-altitude karst areas, is extremely rich in water resources, like springs, swamps and streams including: Cordevole, Mis, Caorame, Stien (Caorame tributary), Falcina (Mis tributary), Ardo, Vescovà, Prampera (Maè tributary), that improve the biological richness of the Park. Some of these streams flow into deep canyons and all are subject to variation.

=== Municipalities ===
The national park includes 15 municipalities: Belluno, Cesiomaggiore, Feltre, Gosaldo, La Valle Agordina, Longarone, Pedavena, Ponte nelle Alpi, Rivamonte, San Gregorio nelle Alpi, Santa Giustina (Italia), Sedico, Sospirolo, Sovramonte and Val di Zoldo.

== Flora ==
The flora of Bellunesi Dolomites is composed by rhododendron, Carduus, edelweiss and other alpine plants. There are broad-leaved tree and pine forests, pastures and alpine meadows.

== Fauna ==
The national park hosts a big alpine biodiversity. Among the most important species are:

- Mammals (Marmot, Stoat, Marten, Roe deer, Chamois, Red deer, Mouflon).
- Bats (Greater mouse-eared bat, Common pipistrelle, Grey long-eared bat, Brown long-eared bat, Daubenton's bat)
- Birds (Black woodpecker, Wallcreeper, Northern goshawk, Kestrel, Golden eagle, Eurasian pygmy owl, Boreal owl, Tawny owl, Eurasian eagle-owl, Hazel grouse, Western capercaillie, Black grouse, Rock ptarmigan, Rock partridge, Hoopoe, Corvidae, Tit, Corn crake, Black redstart, White-winged snowfinch, Northern wheatear).
- Reptiles and amphibians: Alpine newt, Italian crested newt, Fire salamander, Alpine salamander, Yellow-bellied toad, Common toad, Mountain frog, European green toad, Vipera ammodytes.

== See also ==
- Belluno
- Dolomites
- List of national parks of Italy
