= Maè =

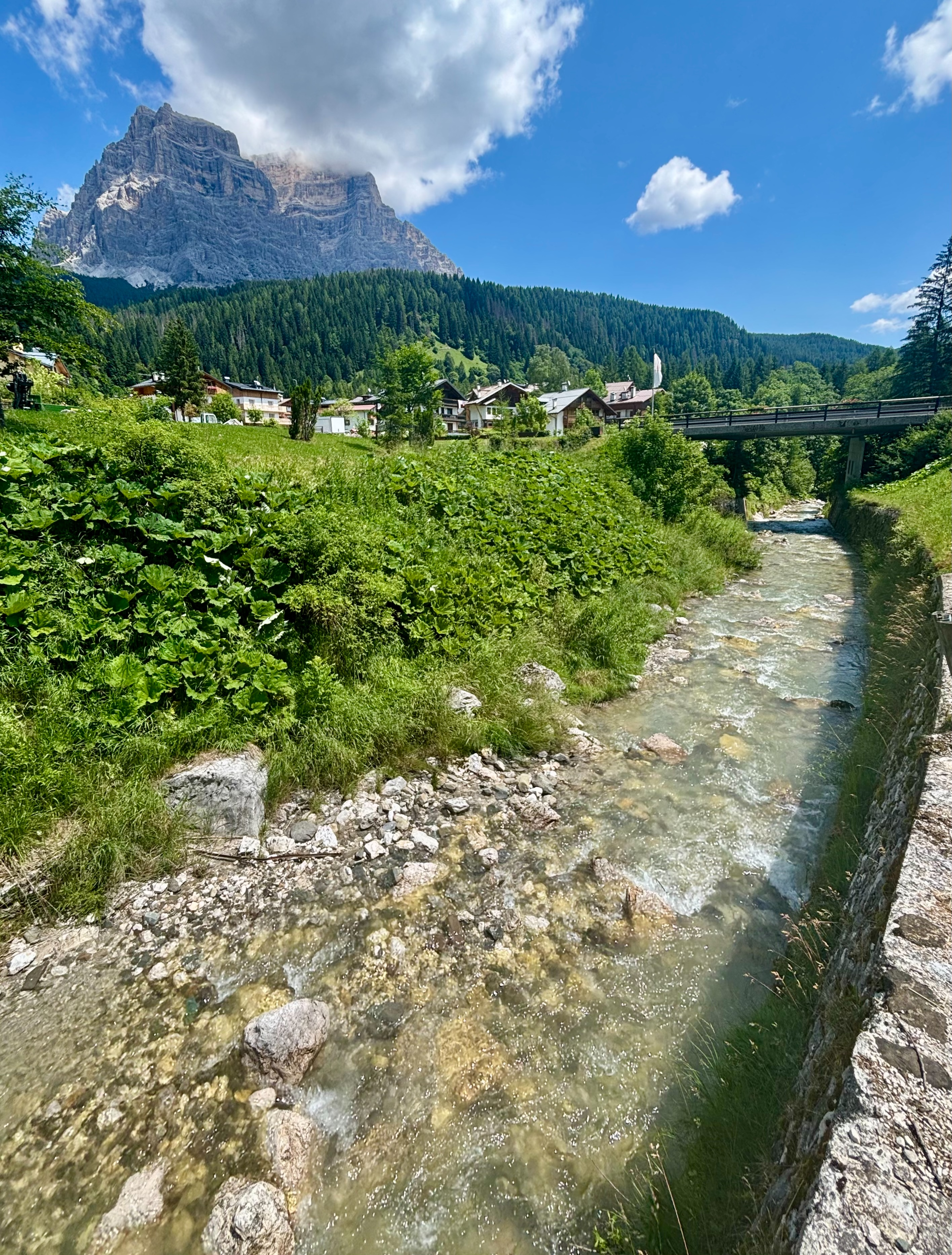

Location
- Country: Italy

Physical characteristics
- Mouth: Piave
  - coordinates: 46.2571°N 12.3103°E

Basin features
- Progression: Piave→ Adriatic Sea

The Maè is the main watercourse along the Val di Zoldo, in Belluno, Italian Eastern Alps. It is a right tributary of the Piave. The valley is also called the Valle del Maè (Mae Valley) along Soffranco and Longarone. The Mae Valley near Forno di Zoldo is the site of the Piave–Boite–Vaiont hydroelectric system.
