= Agordo =

Agordo Àgort (Ladin)
- Comune
- Comune di Agordo
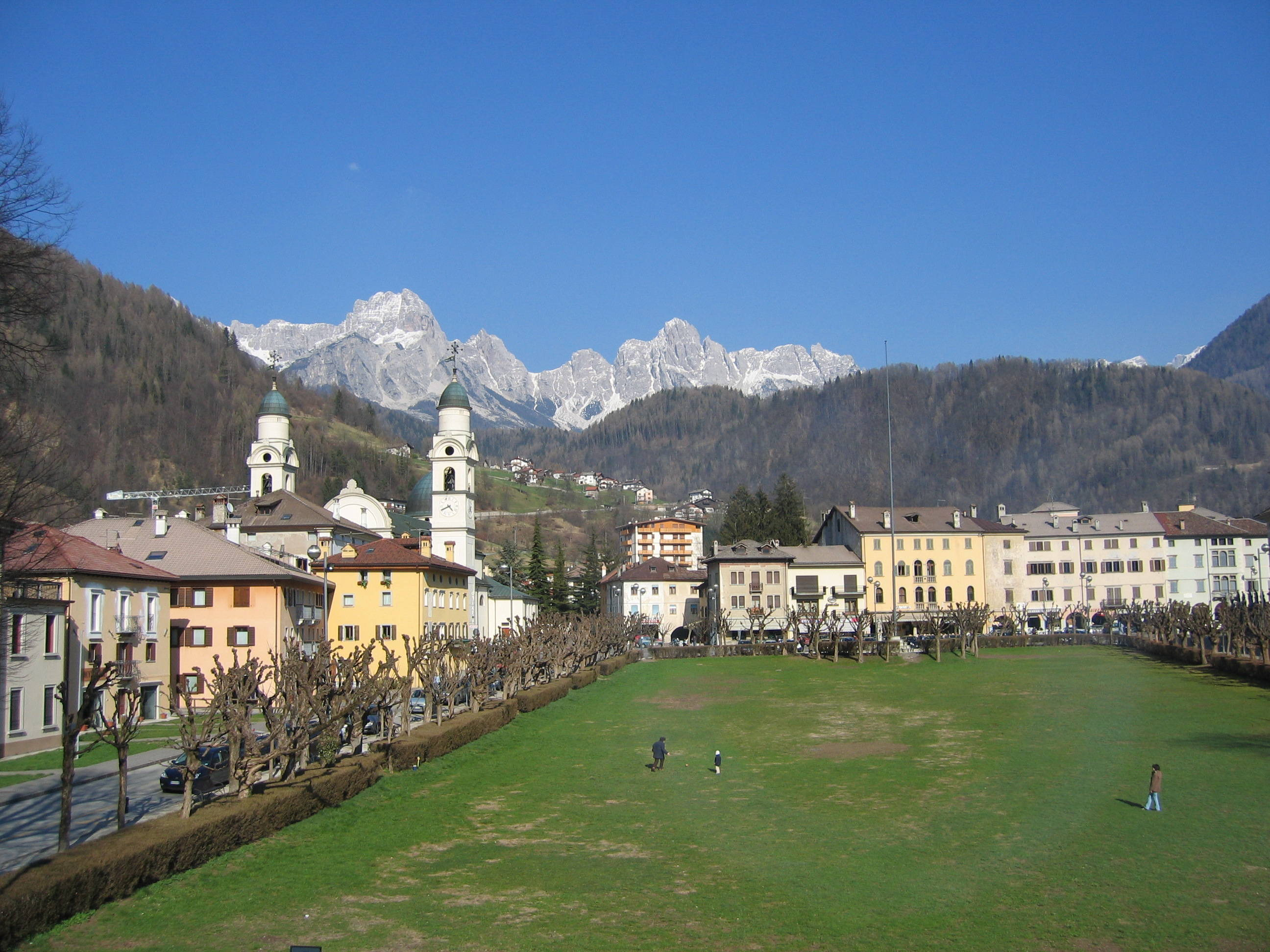
- View of the town center of Agordo (2006)

- Location within Italy Location within Veneto
- Coordinates: 46°16′N 12°2′E
- Country: Italy
- Region: Veneto
- Province: Belluno (BL)
- Frazioni: Brugnach, Colvignas, Crostolin, Farenzena, Giove, Le Grave, Mozzach (ladin: Mozach), Parech, Piasent, Ponte Alto, Rif, Toccol (ladin: Tocol), Valcozzena (ladin: Valcozena), Val di Frela, Veran

Government
  - Mayor: Sisto Da Roit

Area
  - Total: 23.67 km^{2} (9.14 sq mi)
- Elevation: 611 m (2,005 ft)

Population (30 June 2017)
  - Total: 4,045
  - Density: 170.9/km^{2} (442.6/sq mi)
- Demonym: Agordini
- Time zone: UTC+1 (CET)
  - Summer (DST): UTC+2 (CEST)
- Postal code: 32021
- Dialing code: 0437

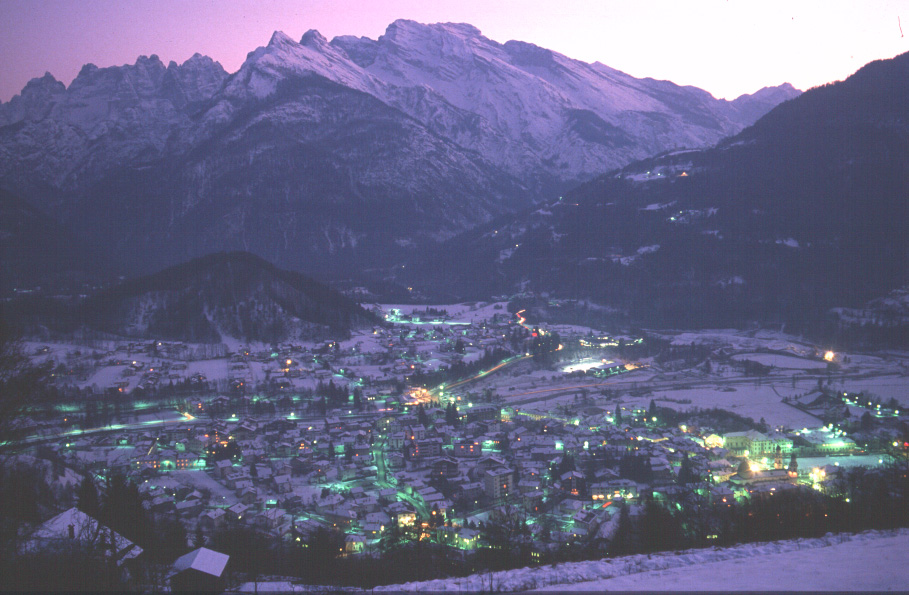
Agordo at dusk (2006)

Agordo (Italian: [ˈaːɡordo]; Ladin: Ègort, locally Àgort; Austrian German: Augarten) is a town and comune (municipality) in the Province of Belluno, in the Veneto region in Italy. It is located about 100 kilometres (62 miles) north of Venice and about 20 kilometres (12 miles) northwest of Belluno.

Agordo was the headquarters of Luxottica Group S.p.A., the world's biggest eyewear company, before it was moved to Milan.

== Notable people ==
- Antonio Pavanello (born 1982), rugby union player
- Carlo Lorenzi (born 1974), ice hockey player
- Filippo De Col (born 1993), football player
- Fulvio Scola (born 1982), cross-country skier
- Lino De Toni (born 1972), ice hockey player
- Luigi Favretti (1872–1950), sports shooter
- Magda Genuin (born 1979), cross-country skier
- Manuela Friz (born 1978), ice hockey player
- Nadia De Nardin (born 1975), ice hockey player
- Tito Livio Burattini (1617–1681), polymath and inventor

== Twin towns ==
- Zugliano, Italy
- Dolomieu, France
