= Cadore Lake =

Lake in Veneto, Italy

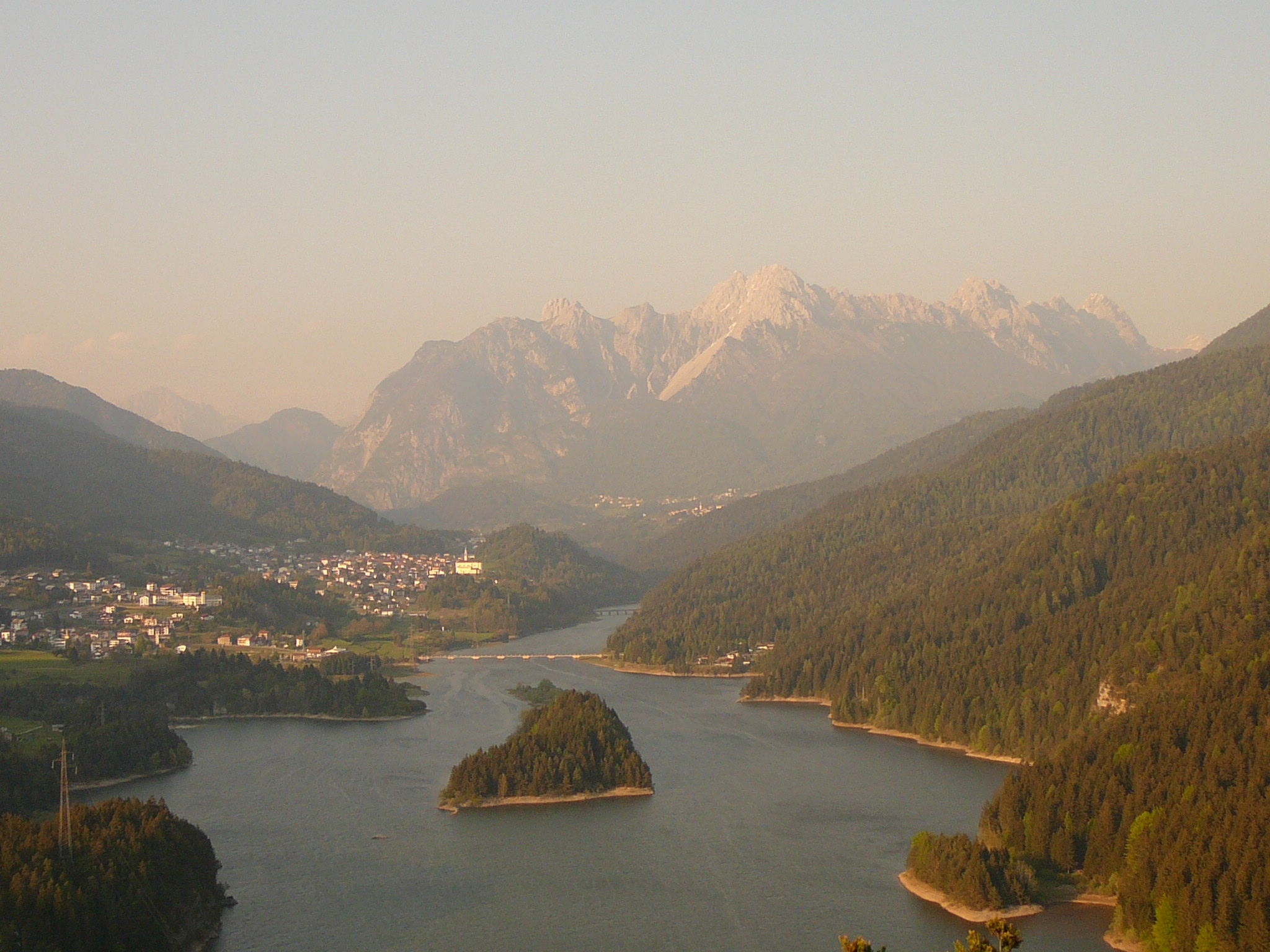

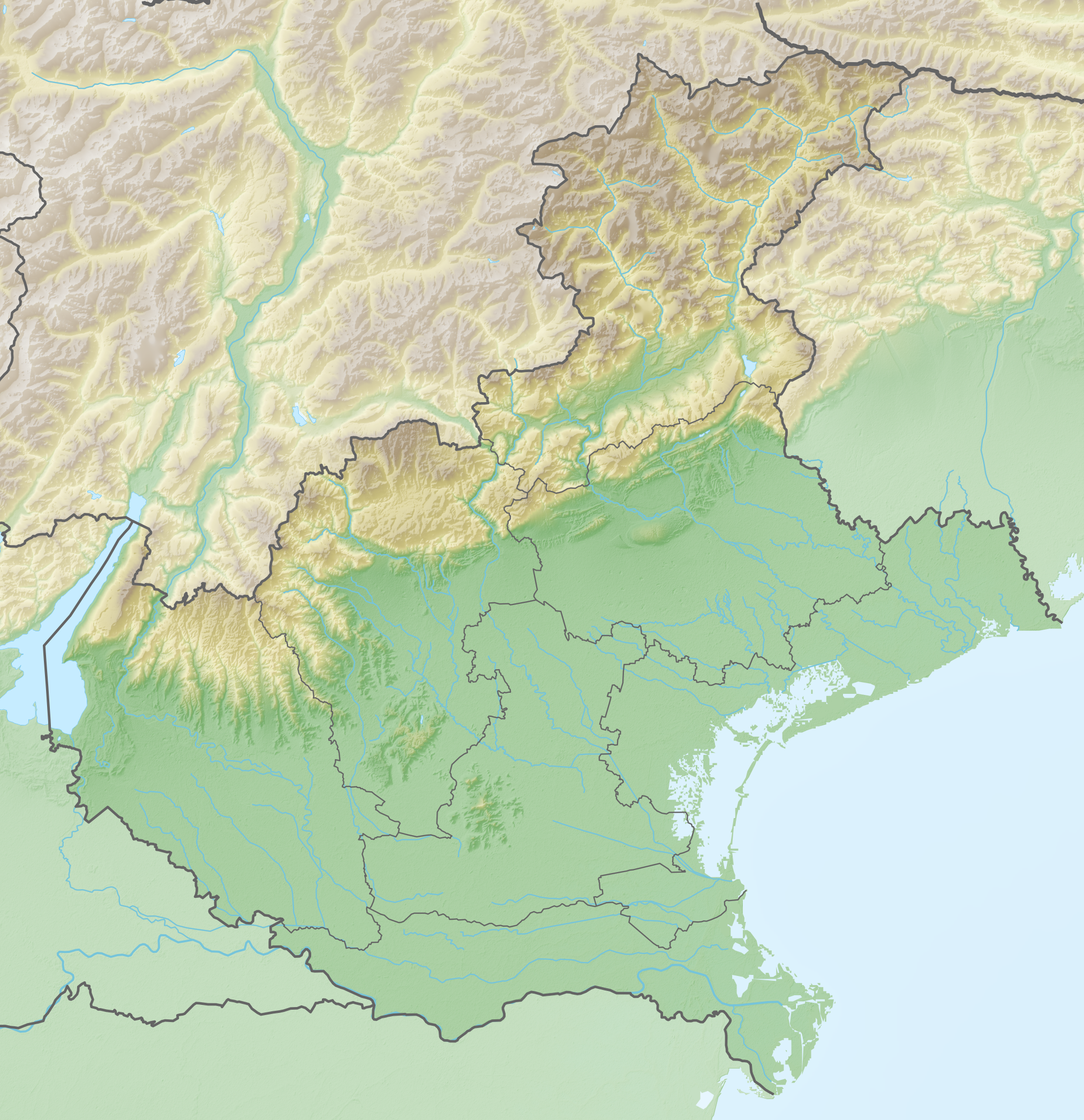
- Location within Veneto
- Location: Province of Belluno, Veneto
- Coordinates: 46°26′00.00″N 12°23′15.00″E
- Primary inflows: Piave
- Primary outflows: Piave
- Basin countries: Italy
- Surface area: 2.3 km^{2} (0.89 sq mi)
- Surface elevation: 683 m (2,241 ft)

The Centro Cadore lake, or more simply Cadore lake, is an artificial body of water located in the historical-geographical region of Cadore, along the upper course of the Piave river in Italy

The 2.3 km^{2} basin originated in the 1950s with the construction of the Pieve di Cadore dam, in the Sottocastello area. Narrow and long in shape with a south-north orientation, it reaches the town of Lozzo di Cadore, also involving the municipalities of Calalzo di Cadore, Domegge di Cadore and Lorenzago di Cadore.

== History ==
According to topographer Alessio De Bon, a pre-Roman road connected Domegge di Cadore to the island of the lake and continued towards Rauža di Sottocastello, along Pian dele Ere, thanks to a bridge that crossed the Piave in Tras, in the section where it flowed between the rocks. The road then continued towards Caralte. Recent archaeological finds seem to confirm, in addition to the presence of the road, the hypothesis that the island was one of the first and most important Paleovenetian settlements in Cadore, a civil and religious teuta (community in Celtic). What before the formation of the lake was a hill in the center of the Piave valley was probably the political seat, Lagole the religious one. Domegge (Duemilia) could therefore take its name from the exact distance, or two miles, which separates it from the island, the main center.

The lake was formed in the 1950s following the construction of the Pieve di Cadore dam which blocks the Piave at Sottocastello. The infrastructure was part of the complex of dams and power stations built by SADE along the upper river basin. In the center of the basin, in front of Calalzo, some islets have formed which become peninsulas according to the water level, artificially regulated by ENEL.

== Refuges and huts ==
Once you have crossed the Domegge bridge, following the paved road to the right, you can reach the Cercenà Refuge and the Padova Refuge [2], at the foot of the Spalti di Toro. The two refuges in winter can also be reached with snowshoes, starting from the left bank of the lake and following the signs for the beaten path. Also starting from the lake, the Hermitage of the Romiti di Monte Froppa can also be reached on foot in less than an hour. From Sottocastello, on the other hand, once you have crossed the dam, you can reach the Vedorcia pasture (1700 m) and the Tita Barba Refuge via a steep dirt road (initially paved).

== Gallery ==
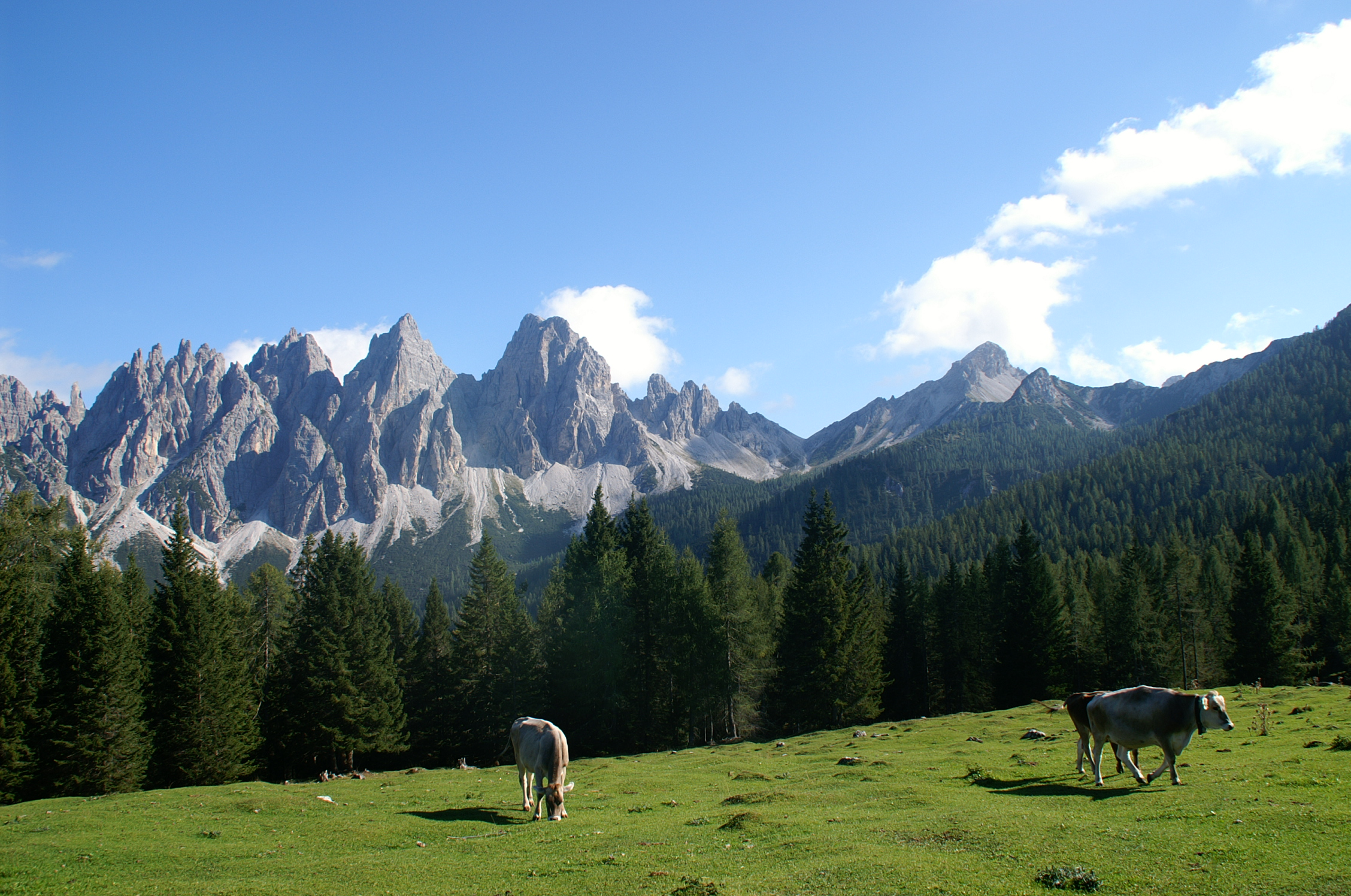
Spalti di Toro and Forcella Spé.

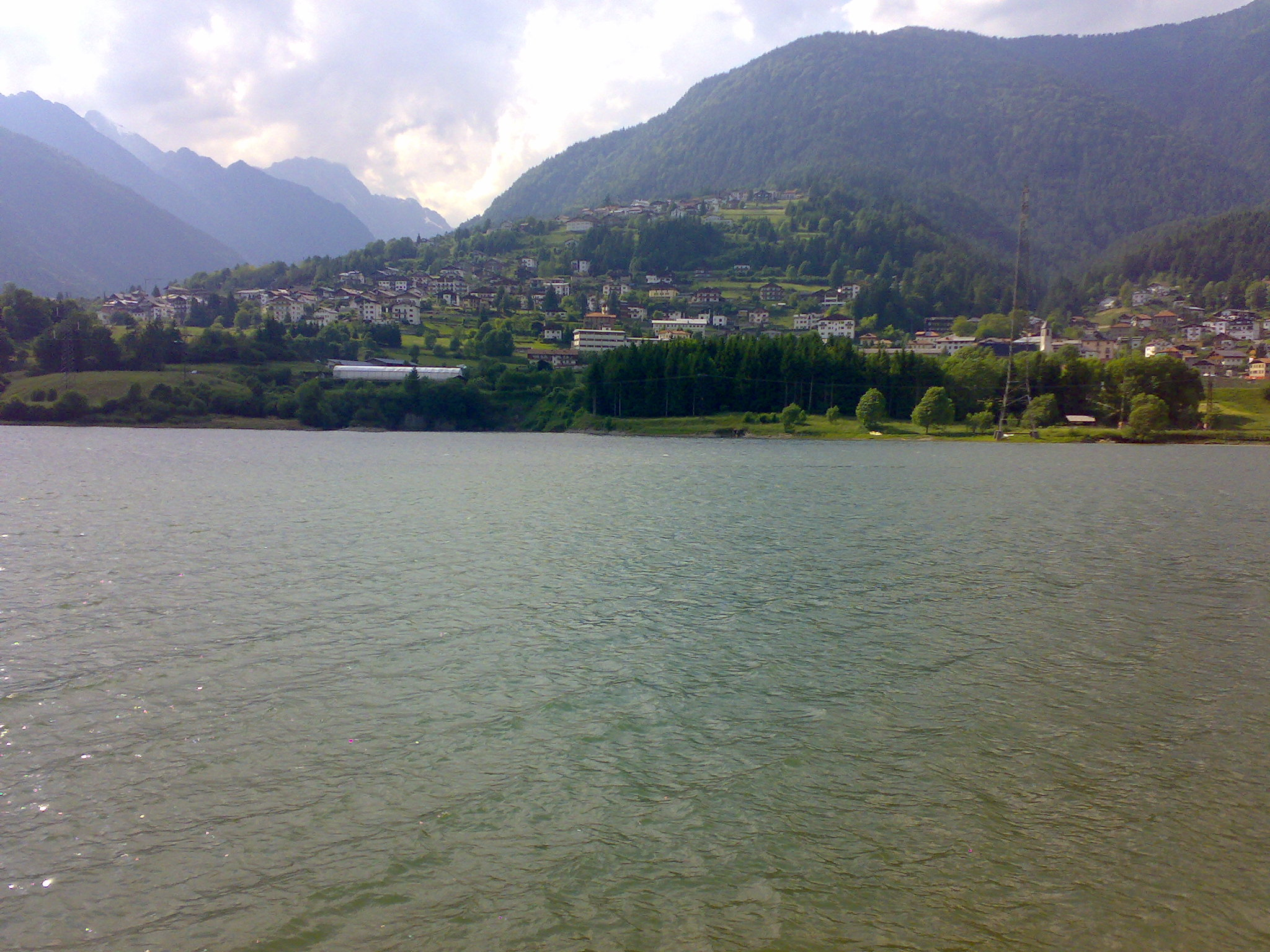
Vallesella.

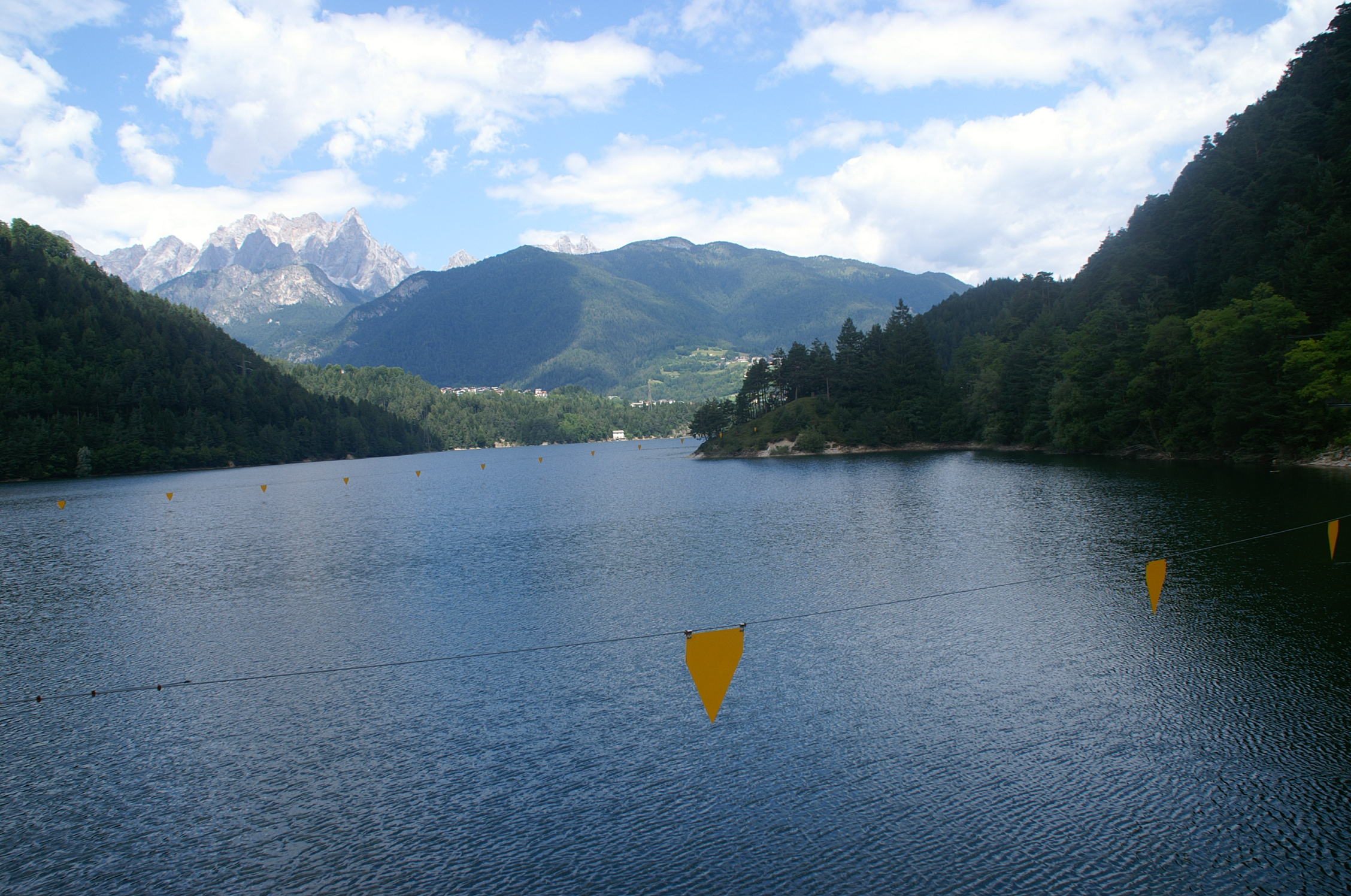
from the doom

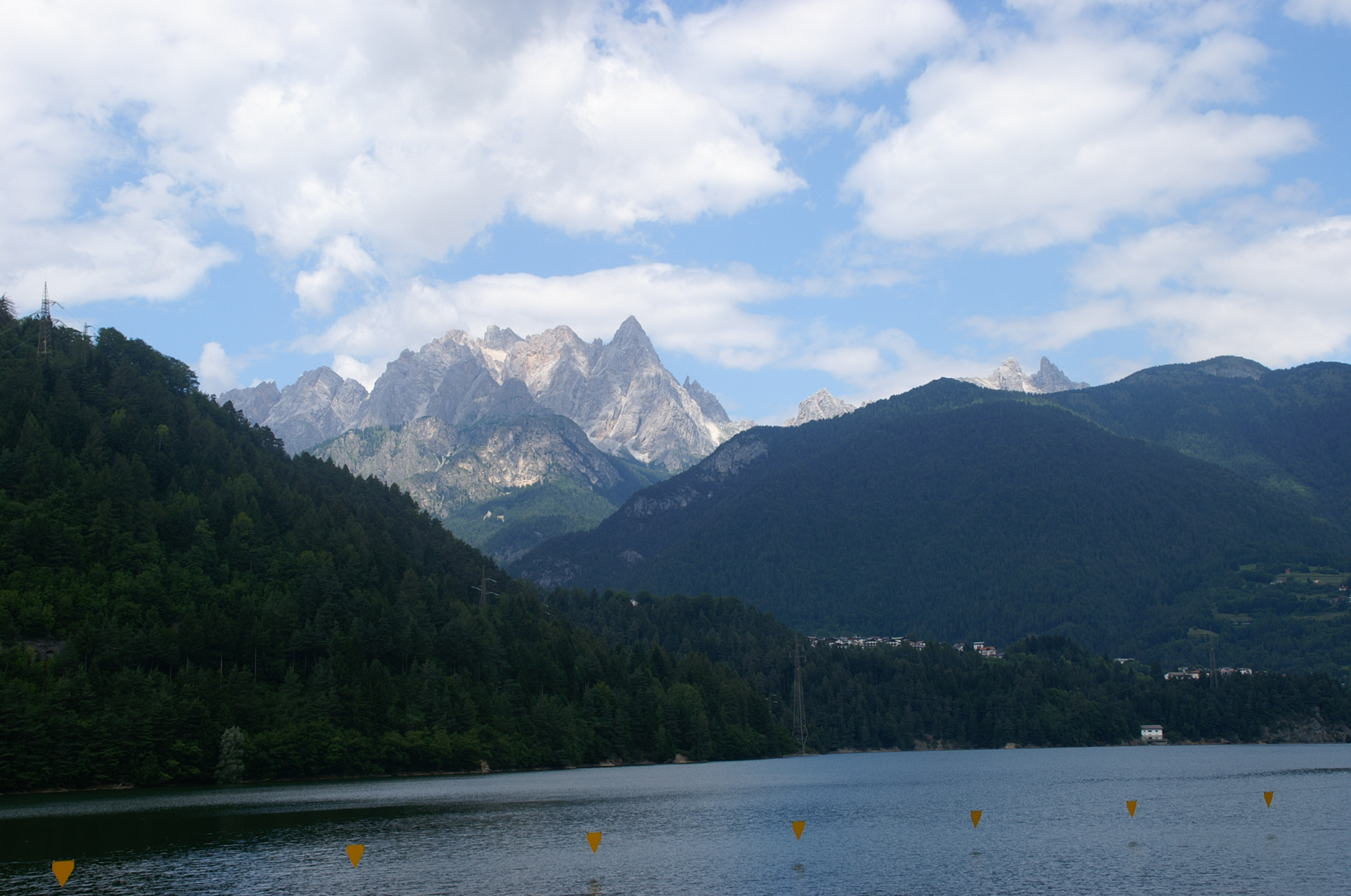
The lake and Marmarole.

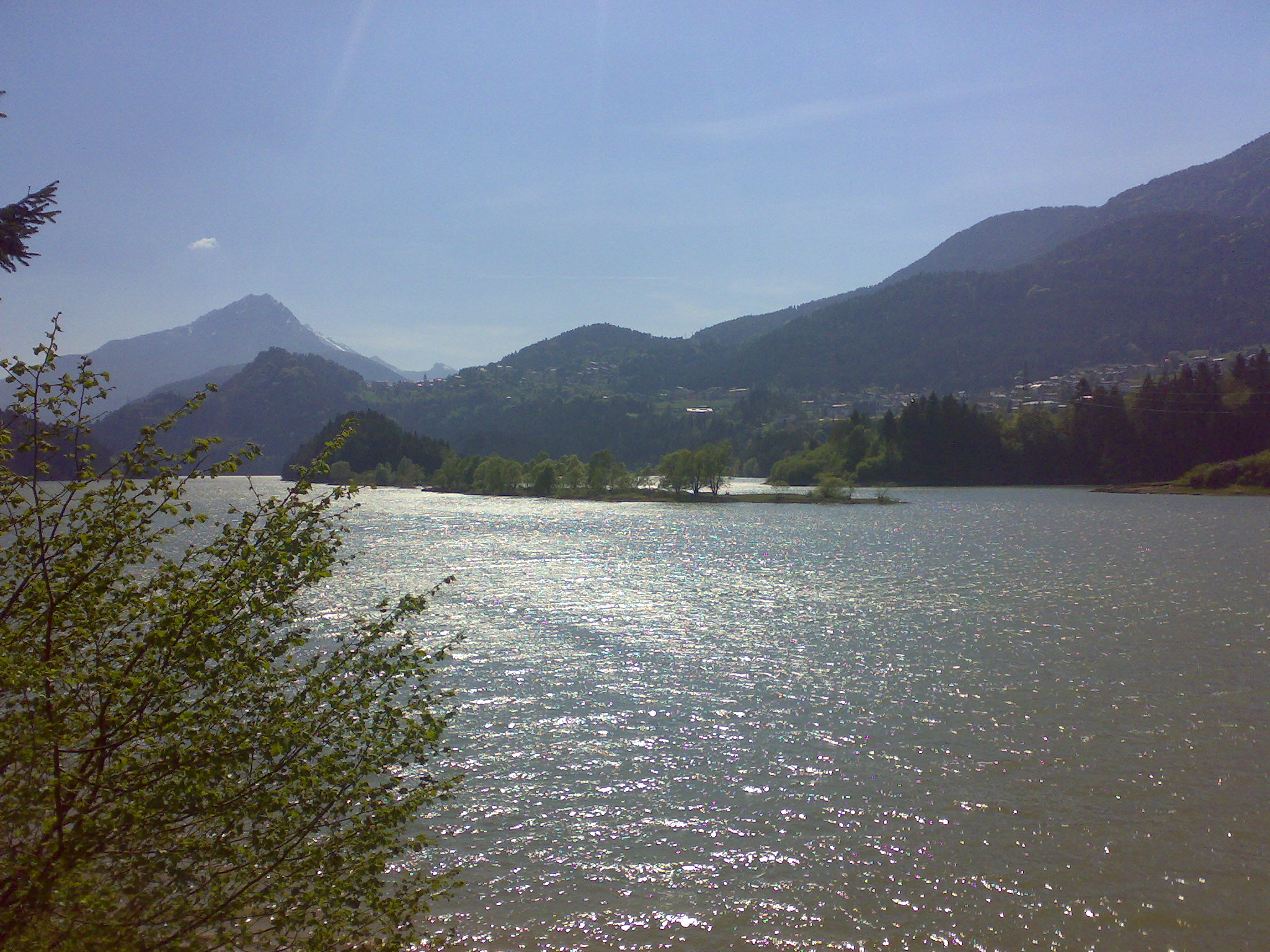
The island.

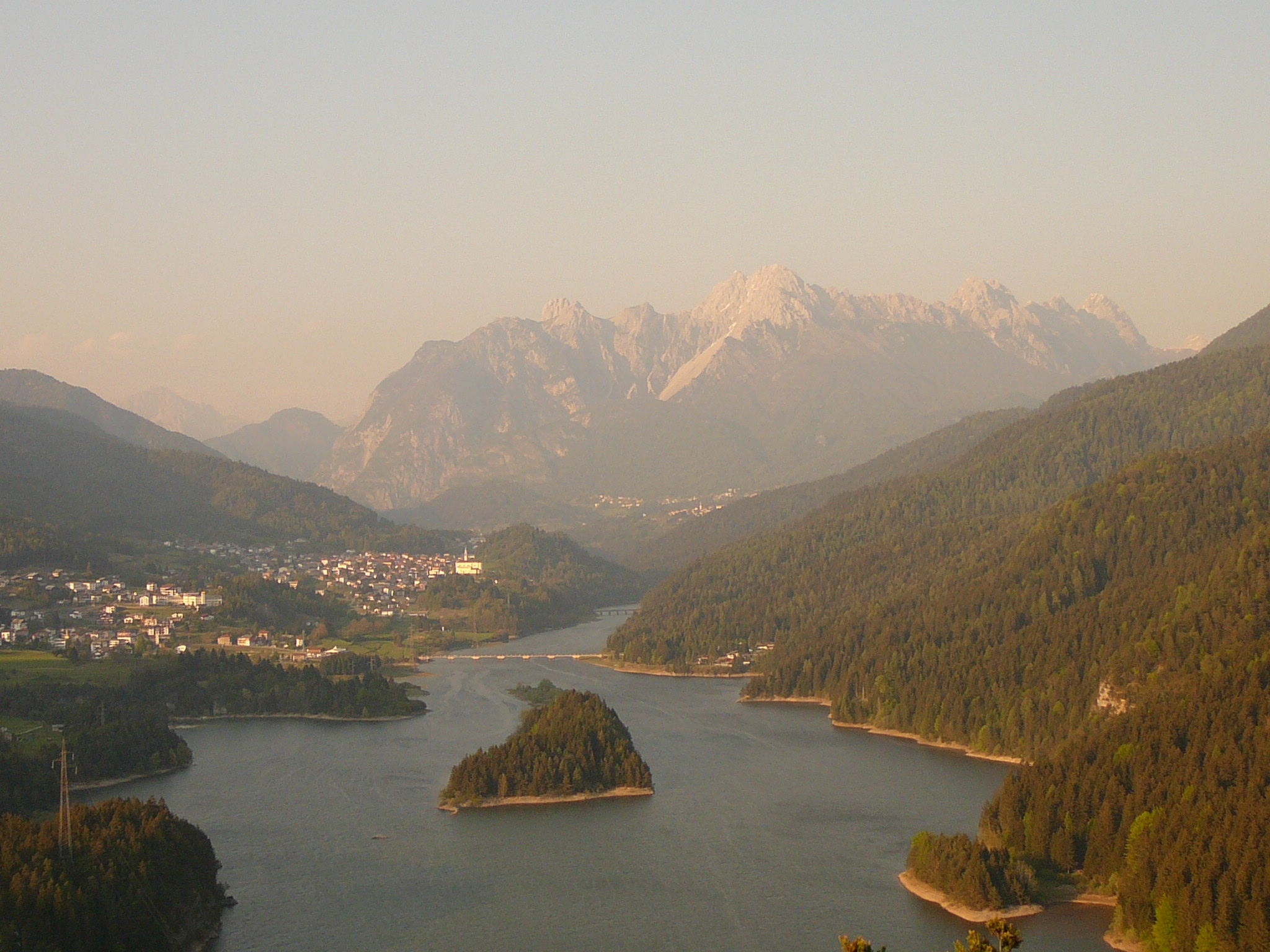
From Calalzo

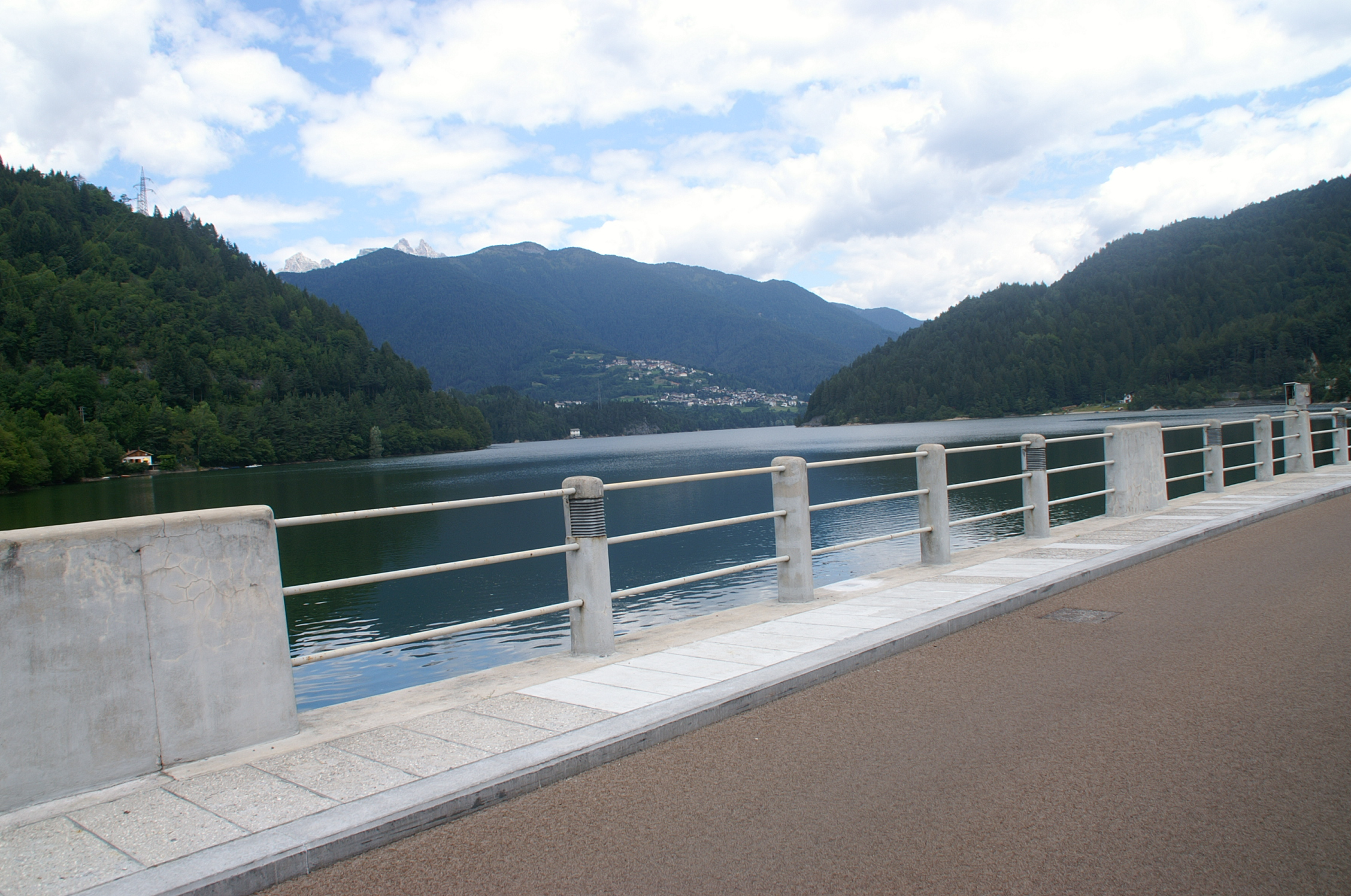
the doom
