= Domegge di Cadore =

- Comune
- Comune di Domegge di Cadore
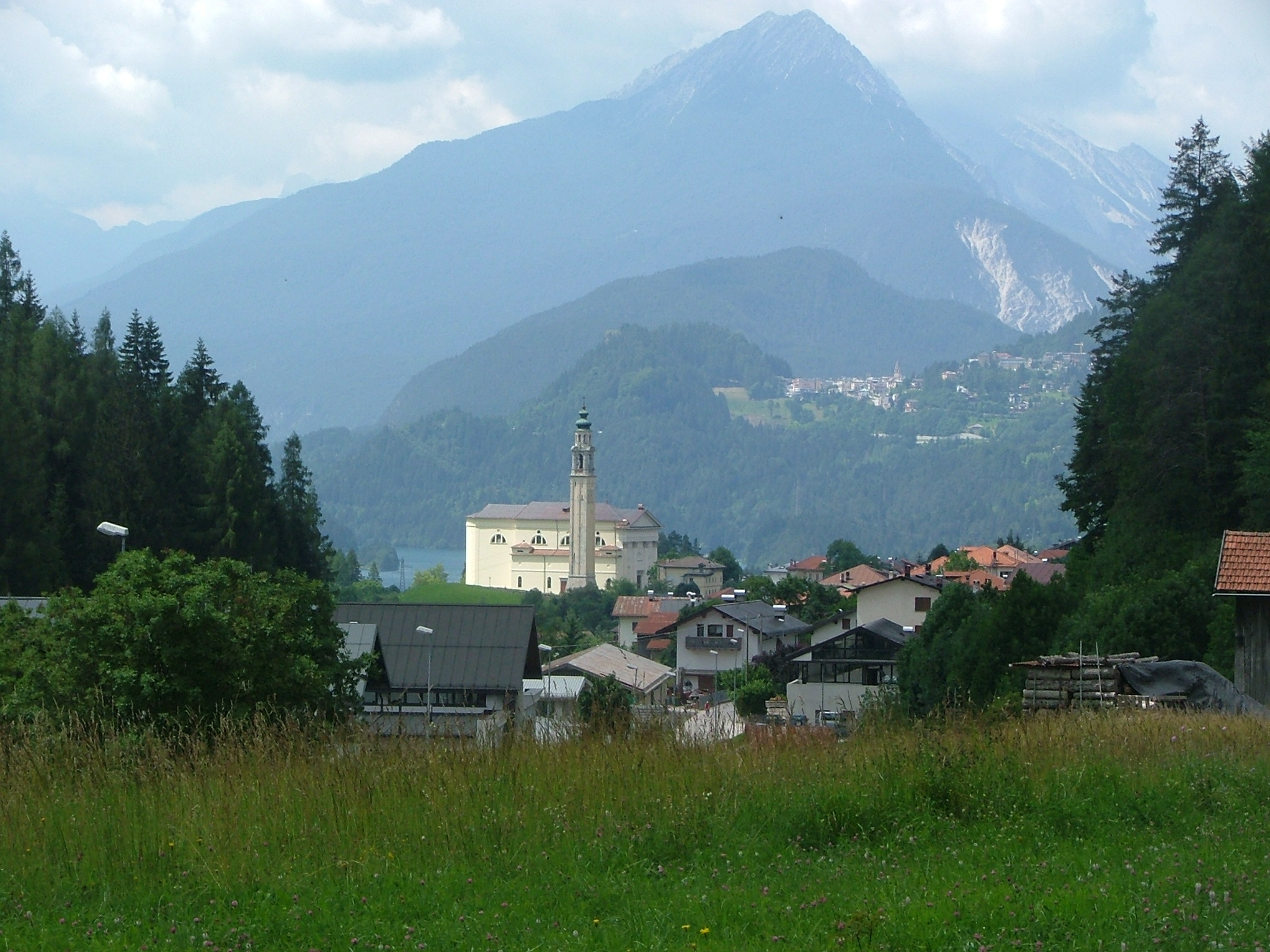

- Location within Italy Location within Veneto
- Coordinates: 46°28′N 12°25′E
- Country: Italy
- Region: Veneto
- Province: Belluno (BL)
- Frazioni: Vallesella di Cadore, Grea di Cadore

Government
  - Mayor: Lino Paolo Fedon

Area
  - Total: 50.4 km^{2} (19.5 sq mi)
- Elevation: 775 m (2,543 ft)

Population (Dec. 2004)
  - Total: 2,675
  - Density: 53.1/km^{2} (137/sq mi)
- Demonym: Domeggesi
- Time zone: UTC+1 (CET)
  - Summer (DST): UTC+2 (CEST)
- Postal code: 32040
- Dialing code: 0435
- Patron saint: St. George
- Saint day: April 23
- Website: Official website

Domegge di Cadore is a comune (municipality) in the Province of Belluno in the Italian region of Veneto, located about 120 kilometres (75 mi) north of Venice and about 40 kilometres (25 mi) northeast of Belluno.

== Geography ==
The town is located in the Piave River valley within the Dolomites, in between the Marmarole group to the northwest and the Friulian Dolomites to the southeast. Representative peaks include Campanile Ciastelin (2,602 m) and Monte Cridola (2,581 m).

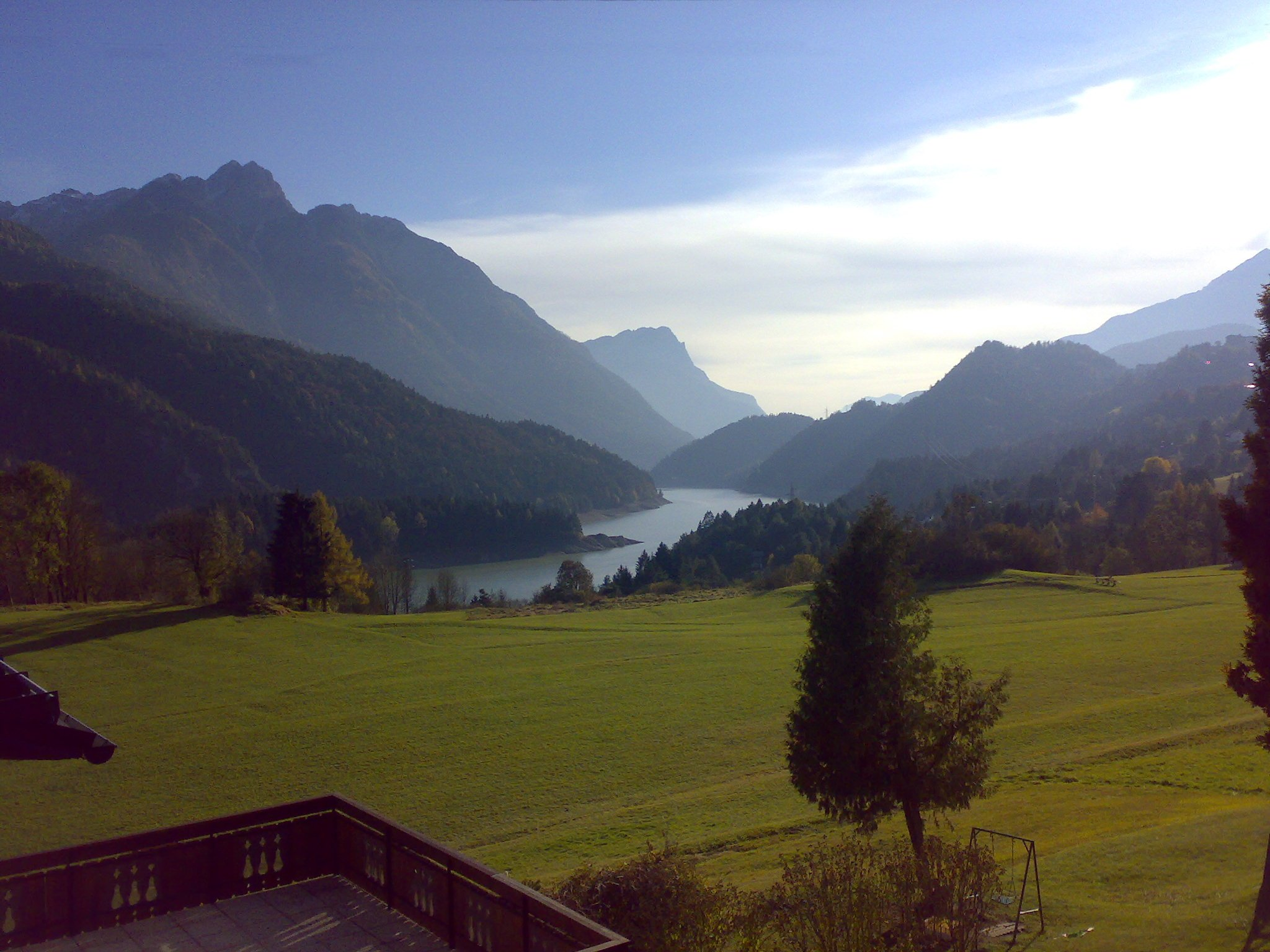
Cadore Lake

The Pieve di Cadore dam, completed in 1949, resulted in the formation of the Cadore Lake. Numerous tributaries flow through the territory into the Piave, including the Molinà, Talagona, and Cridola streams.

The comune is bordered by Auronzo di Cadore, Calalzo di Cadore, Cimolais, Forni di Sopra, Lorenzago di Cadore, Lozzo di Cadore, and Pieve di Cadore.

== History ==
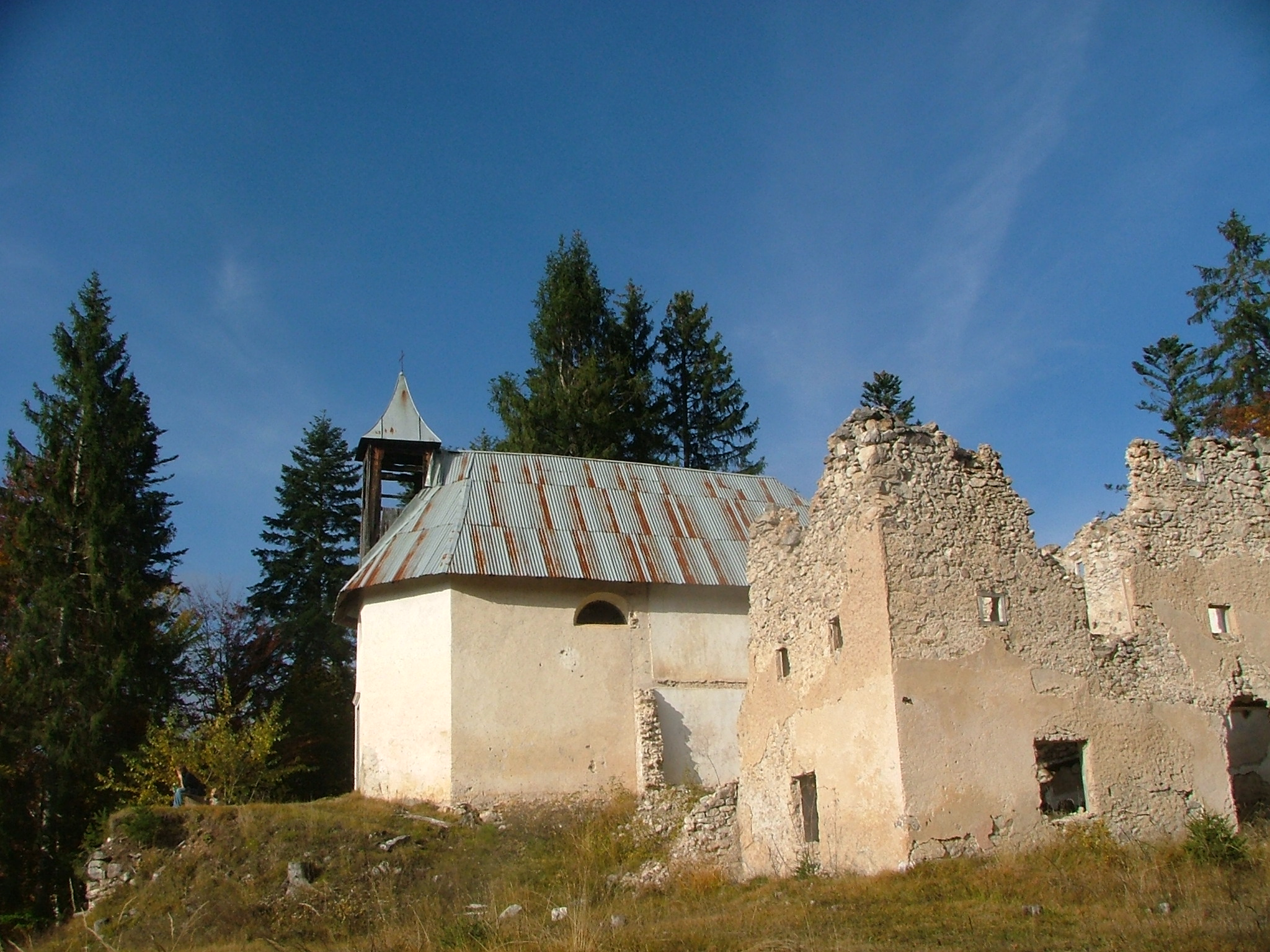
Eremo dei Romiti before the renovation

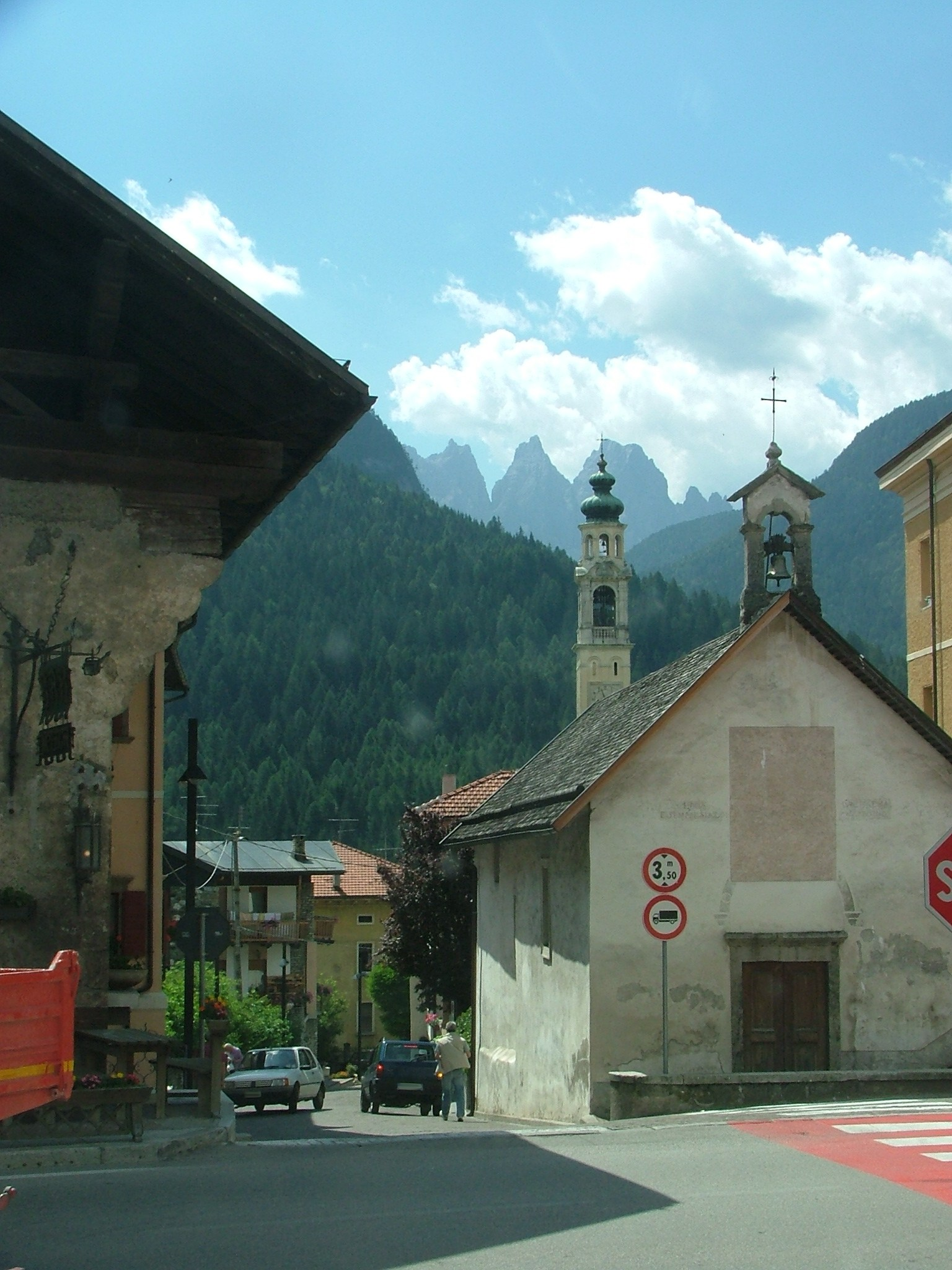
Church of San Rocco

=== From the Bronze Age to the Roman Period ===
Archaeological finds indicate human presence in the Cadore area from at least the Bronze Age. The earliest evidence consists of a bronze sickle and a winged axe discovered at Crodola and dated to the 13th–12th centuries BC. An iron helmet from the 4th–3rd centuries BC was later found at Pegnola (Vallesella).

Roman activity is attested by the discovery of coins dating from the reign of Vespasian (AD 69–79) to Marcus Aurelius (AD 161–180), recovered at sites including Col de Medol and Casa de Barnabo.

In the center of Domegge, a burial containing three individuals—two adults and a youth—was unearthed, accompanied by grave goods such as glass-paste beads, a silver earring, and bronze ornaments. These materials have been dated to the 6th–7th centuries AD. Additional discoveries, including skeletons and funerary objects in the areas of Le Cioupe and Via Trieste, suggest the presence of one or more necropolises.

=== Recent History ===
In the early 20th century, Domegge was affected by the broader emigration movement from the Cadore region.

During the second half of the 20th century, economic conditions improved significantly with the development of the eyewear industry, leading to the decline of traditional agro-pastoral activities. Among the principal local companies is Giorgio Fedon.

In August 1992, the discovery of the body of Don Mario Bisaglia, brother of Senator Antonio Bisaglia, in Lake Cadore drew national media attention.

== Gallery ==
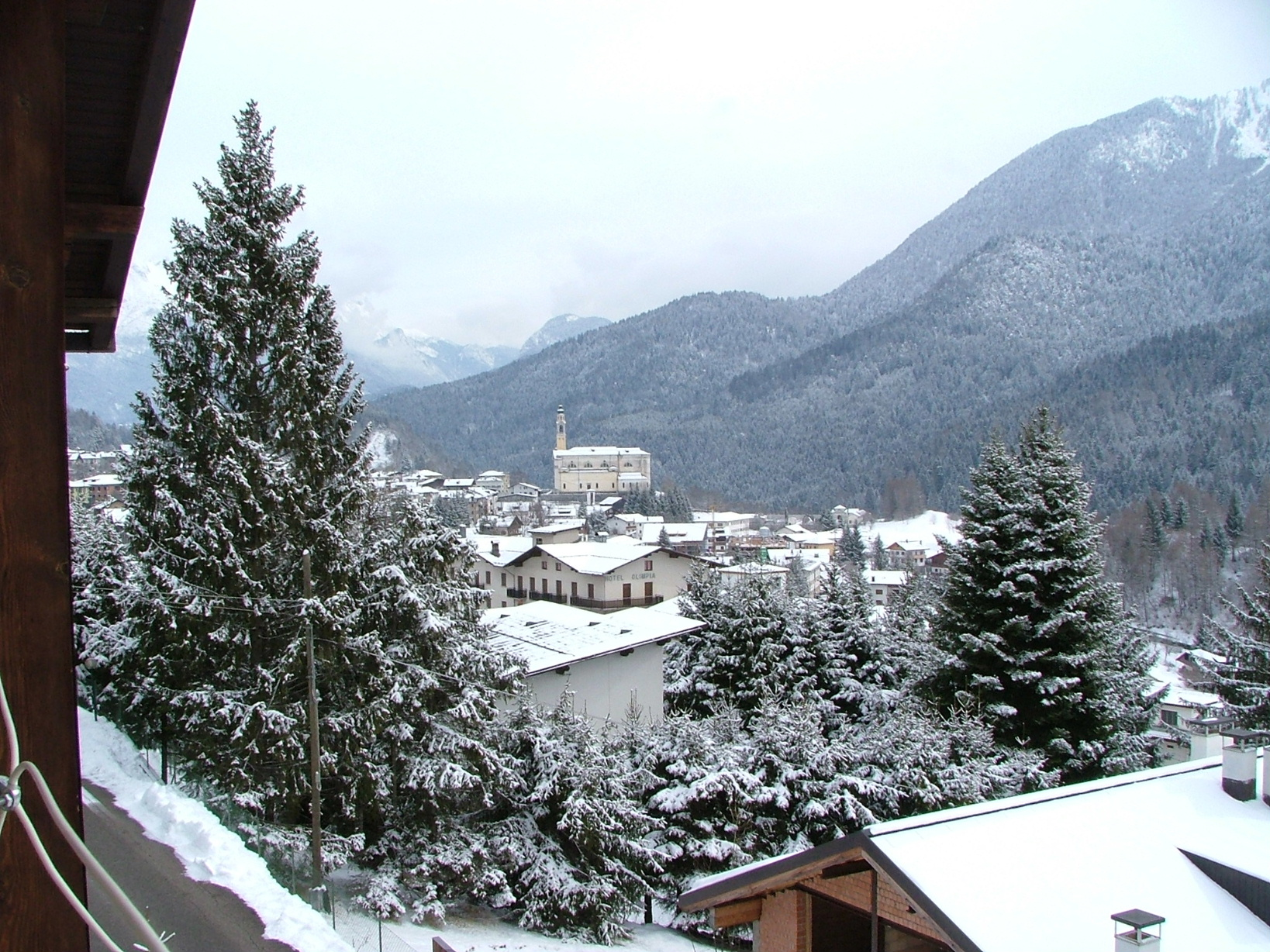
Domegge in winter

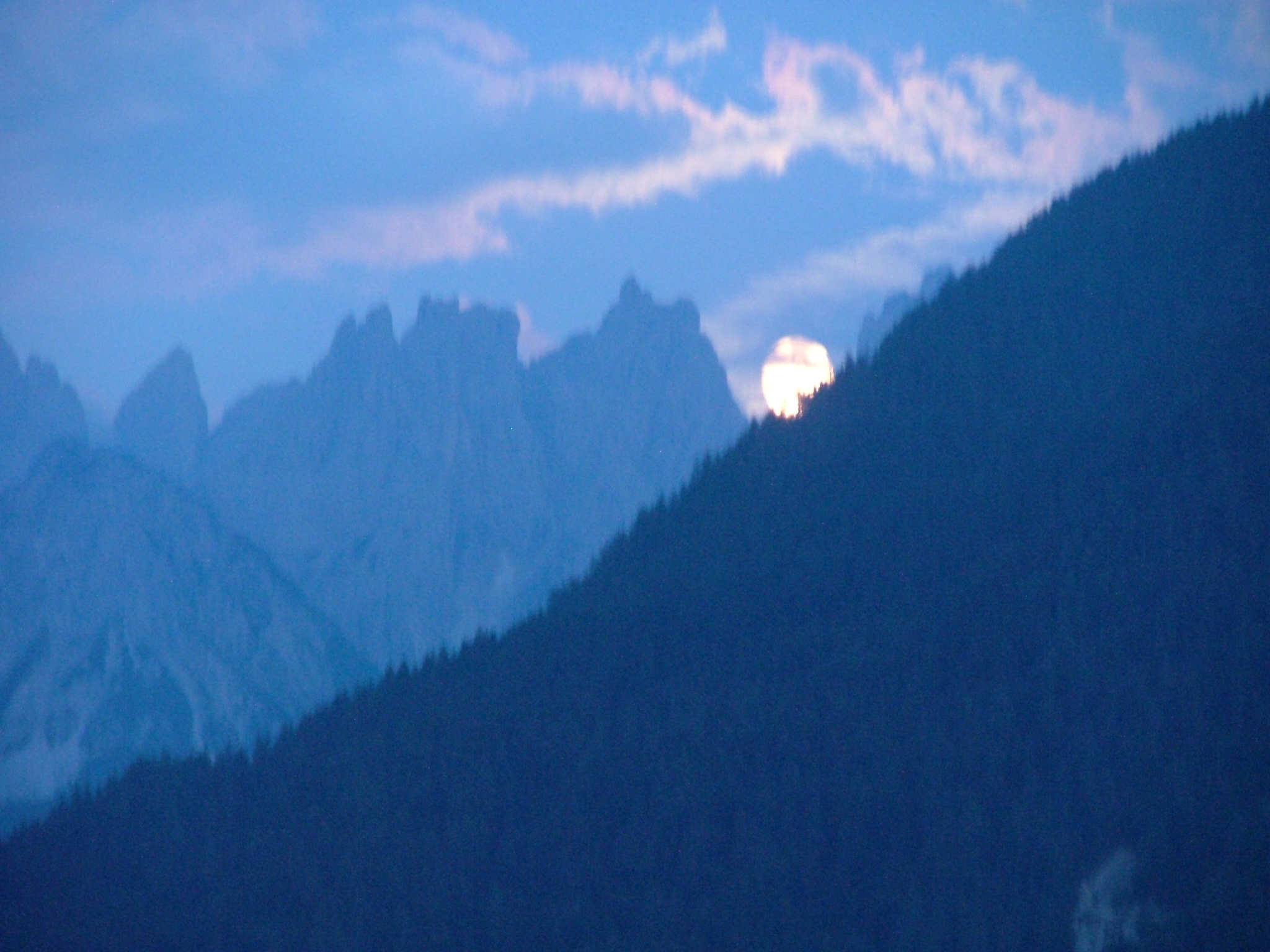
Val di Toro

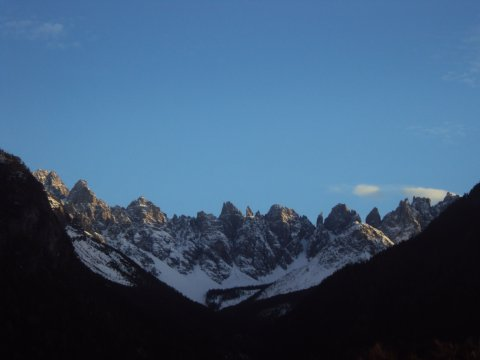
Gli Spalti di Toro

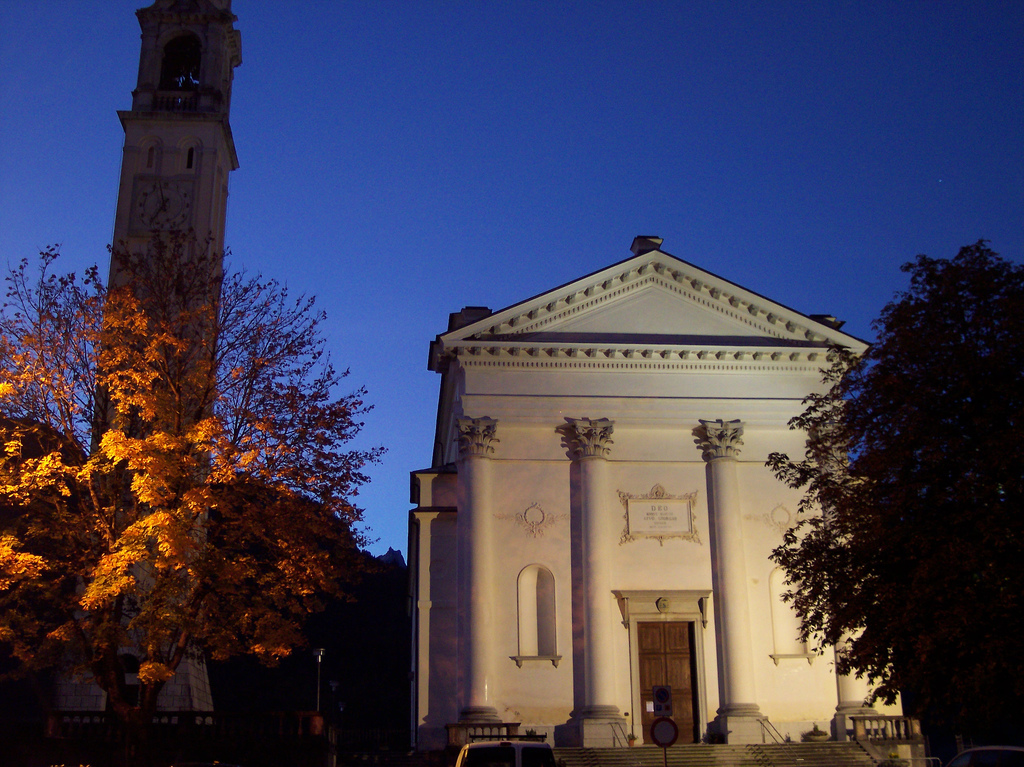
Church of San Giorgio

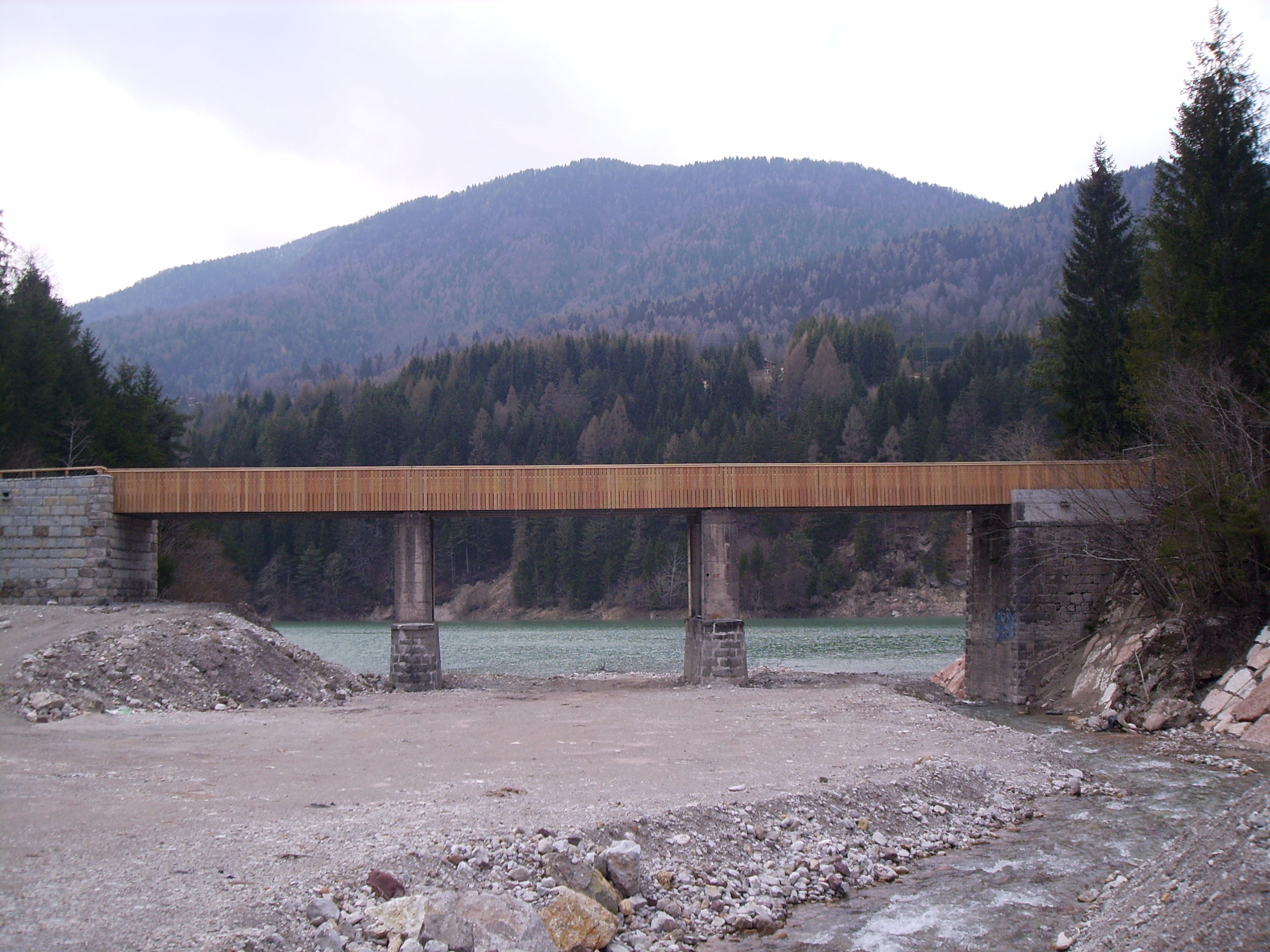
Bridge over Cridola
