= Lorenzago di Cadore =

Lorenzago di Cadore Lorenžàgo (ladin)
- Comune
- Comune di Lorenzago di Cadore
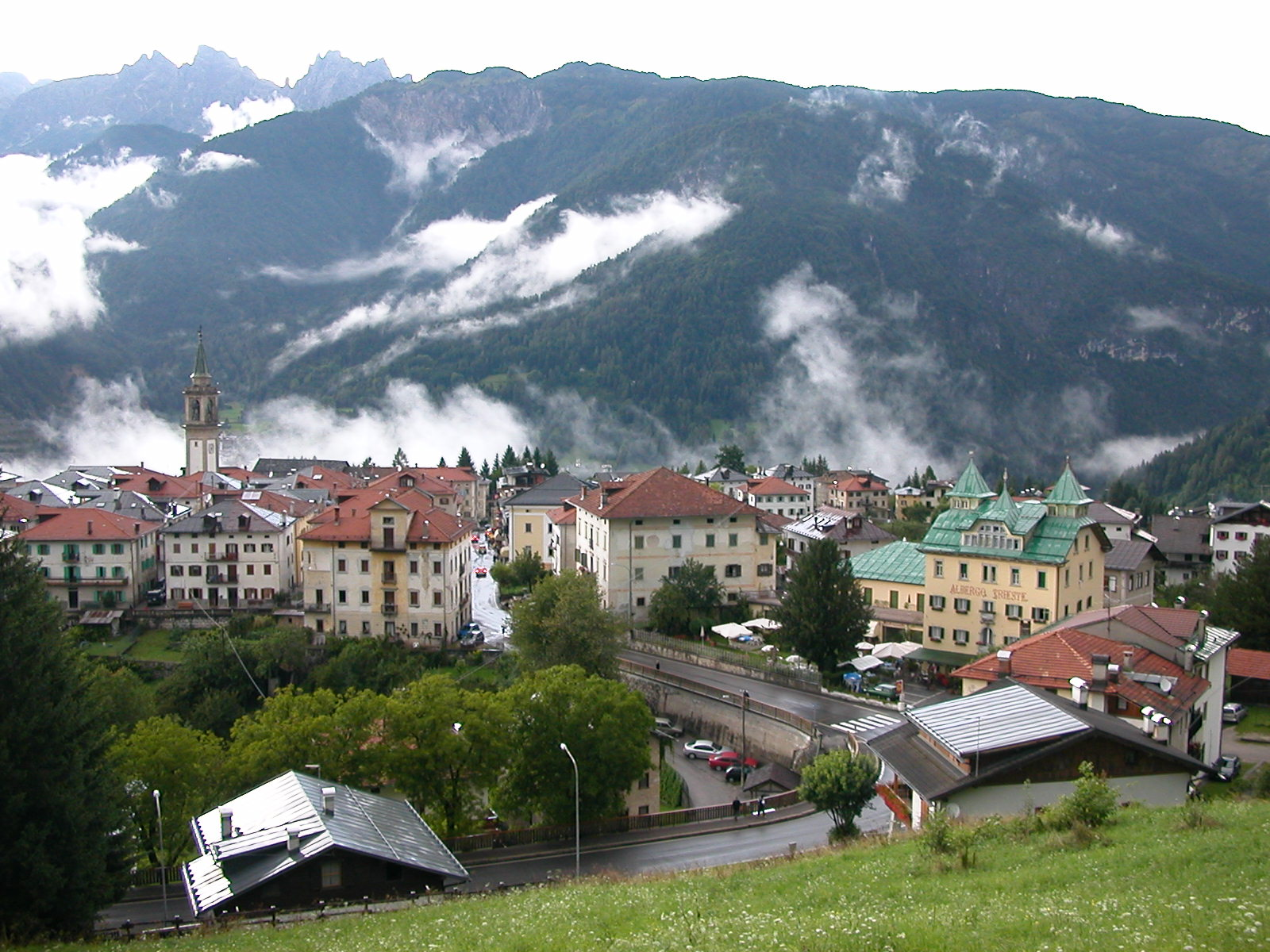

- Location within Italy Location within Veneto
- Coordinates: 46°29′N 12°28′E
- Country: Italy
- Region: Veneto
- Province: Province of Belluno (BL)

Government
  - Mayor: Marco D’Ambros (since June 2019) (Civic List)

Area
  - Total: 27.7 km^{2} (10.7 sq mi)

Population (Dec. 2004)
  - Total: 600
  - Density: 22/km^{2} (56/sq mi)
- Time zone: UTC+1 (CET)
  - Summer (DST): UTC+2 (CEST)
- Postal code: 32040
- Dialing code: 0435

Lorenzago di Cadore is a comune (municipality) in the Province of Belluno in the Italian region of Veneto, located about 120 kilometres (75 mi) north of Venice and about 45 kilometres (28 mi) northeast of Belluno. As of 31 December 2004, it had a population of 600 and an area of 27.7 square kilometres (10.7 mi^{2}).

Lorenzago di Cadore borders the following municipalities: Domegge di Cadore, Forni di Sopra, Lozzo di Cadore, and Vigo di Cadore.

For a number of years, Lorenzago hosted the summer vacation of Pope John Paul II. In 2007, Pope Benedict XVI was on vacation there.

Giulio Tremonti, twice Italian finance minister, was granted honorary citizenship on 29 December 2009. Though born in Sondrio, his father was a native from Lorenzago and here the son hosted the drafters of the centre-right proposal of Constitutional amendment.

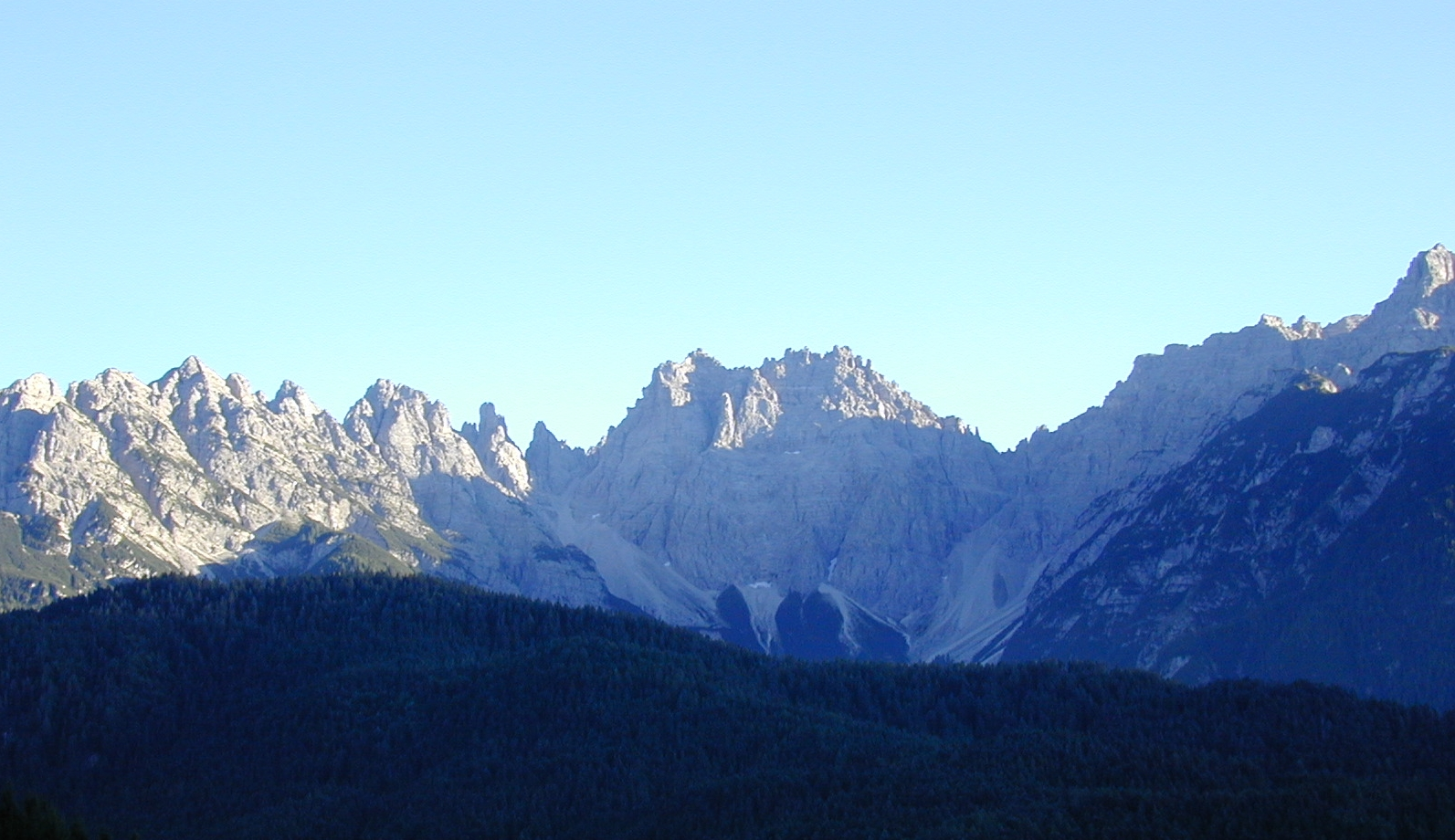
The valley of Cridola

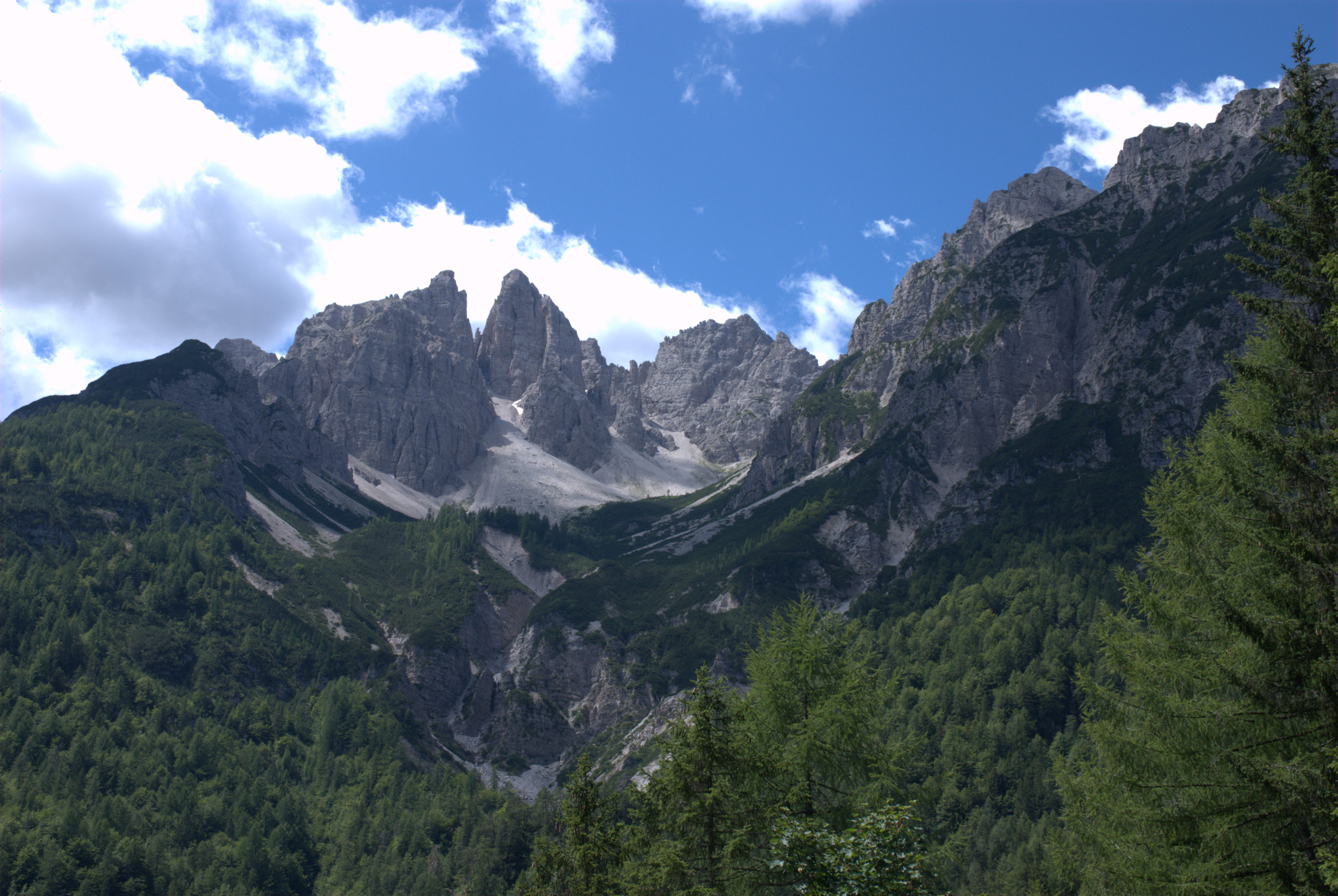
The valley of Tora

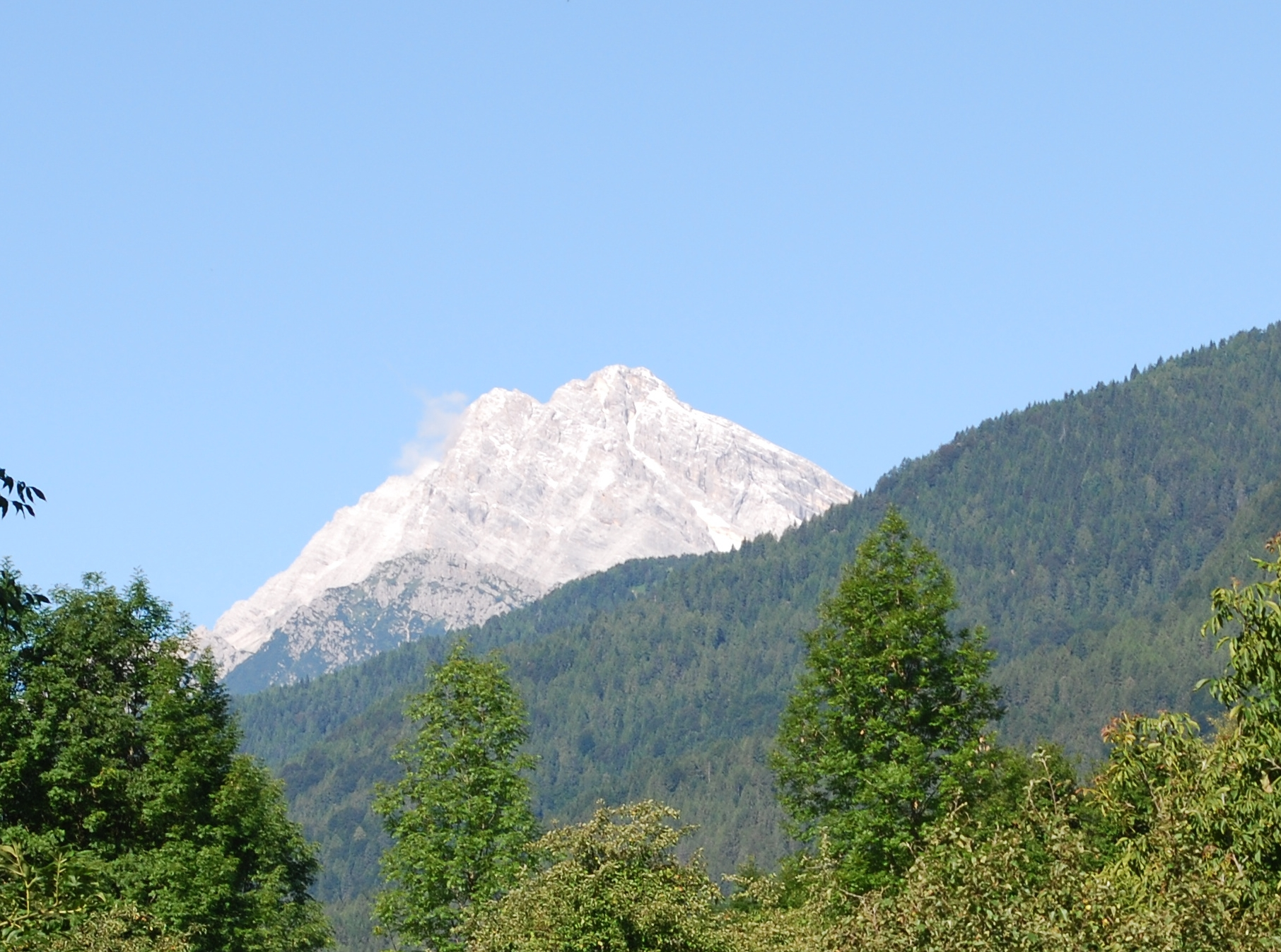
Antelao (3.263 m) seen by the village

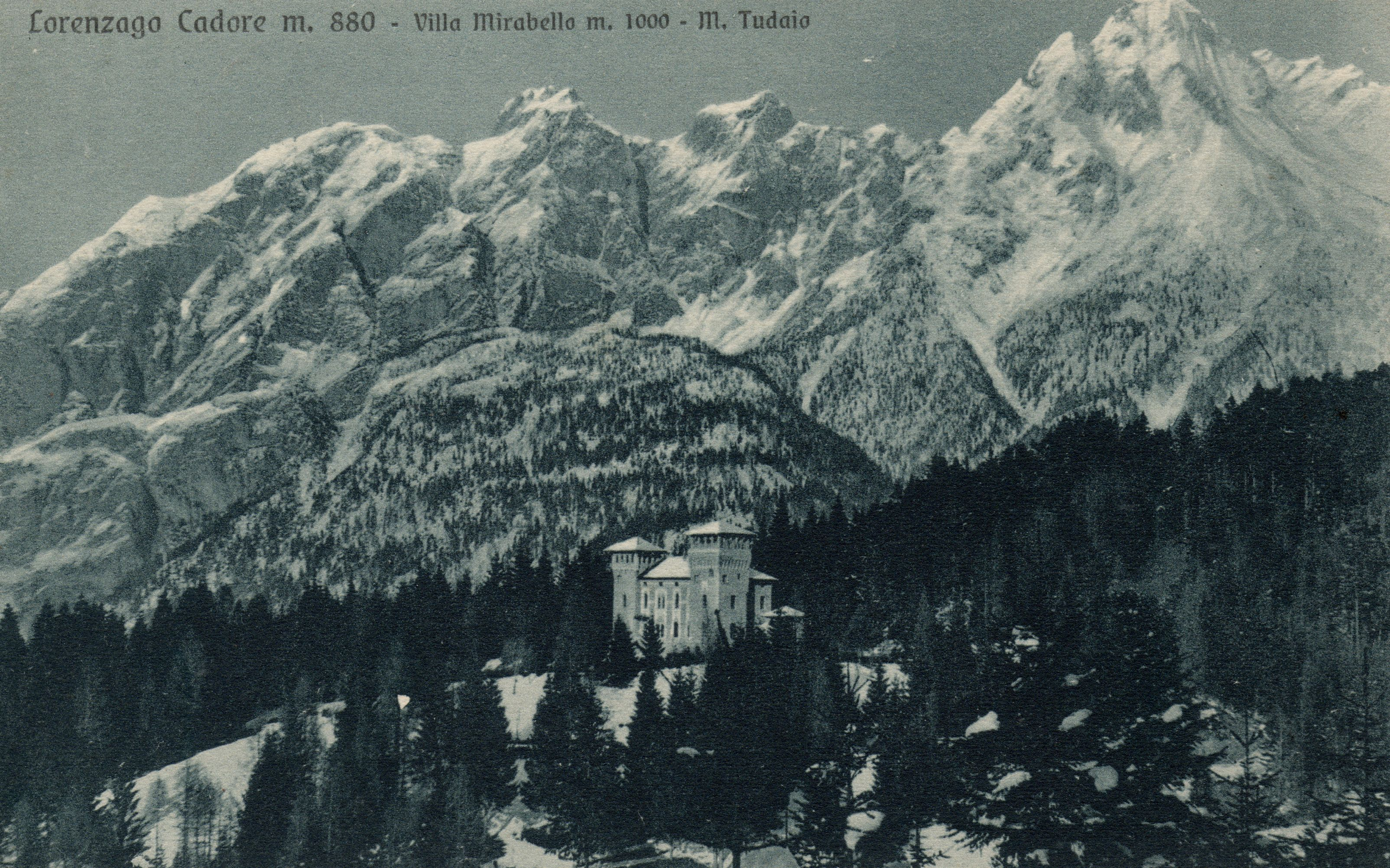
The castle of Mirabello in 1930

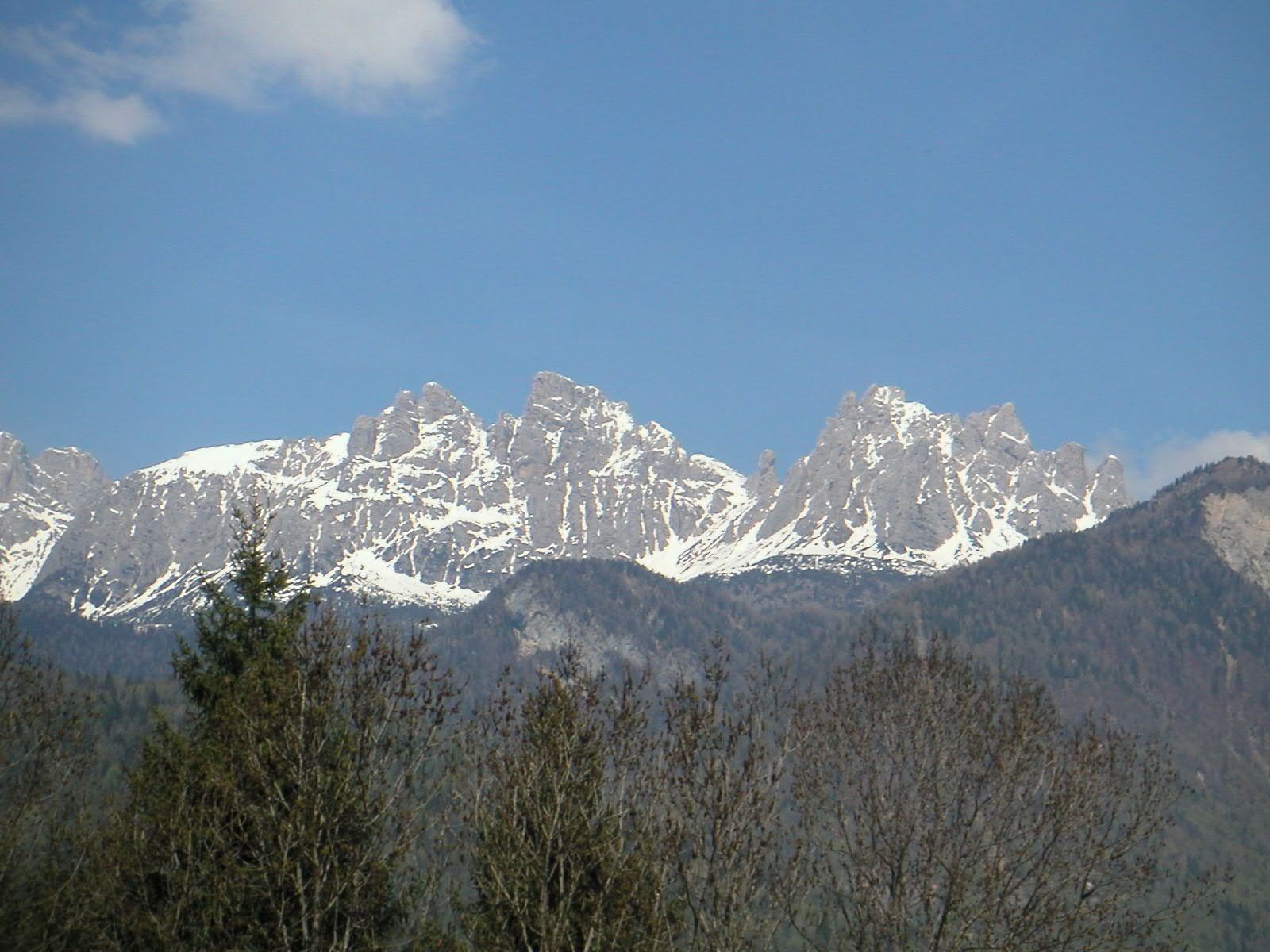
Marmarole (2.932 m), the Titian mountains

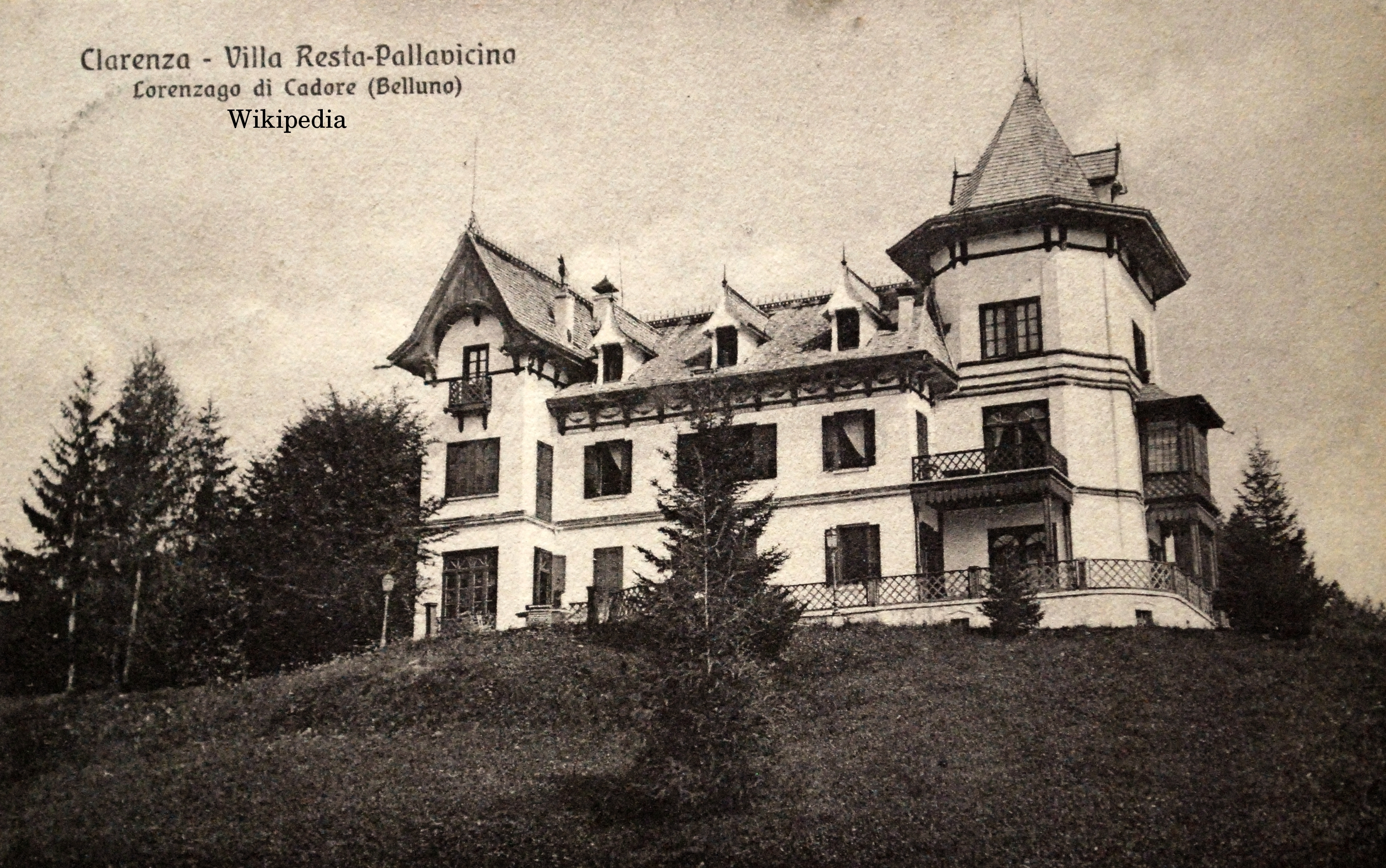
Villa Clarenza was burned by Germans in 1944.

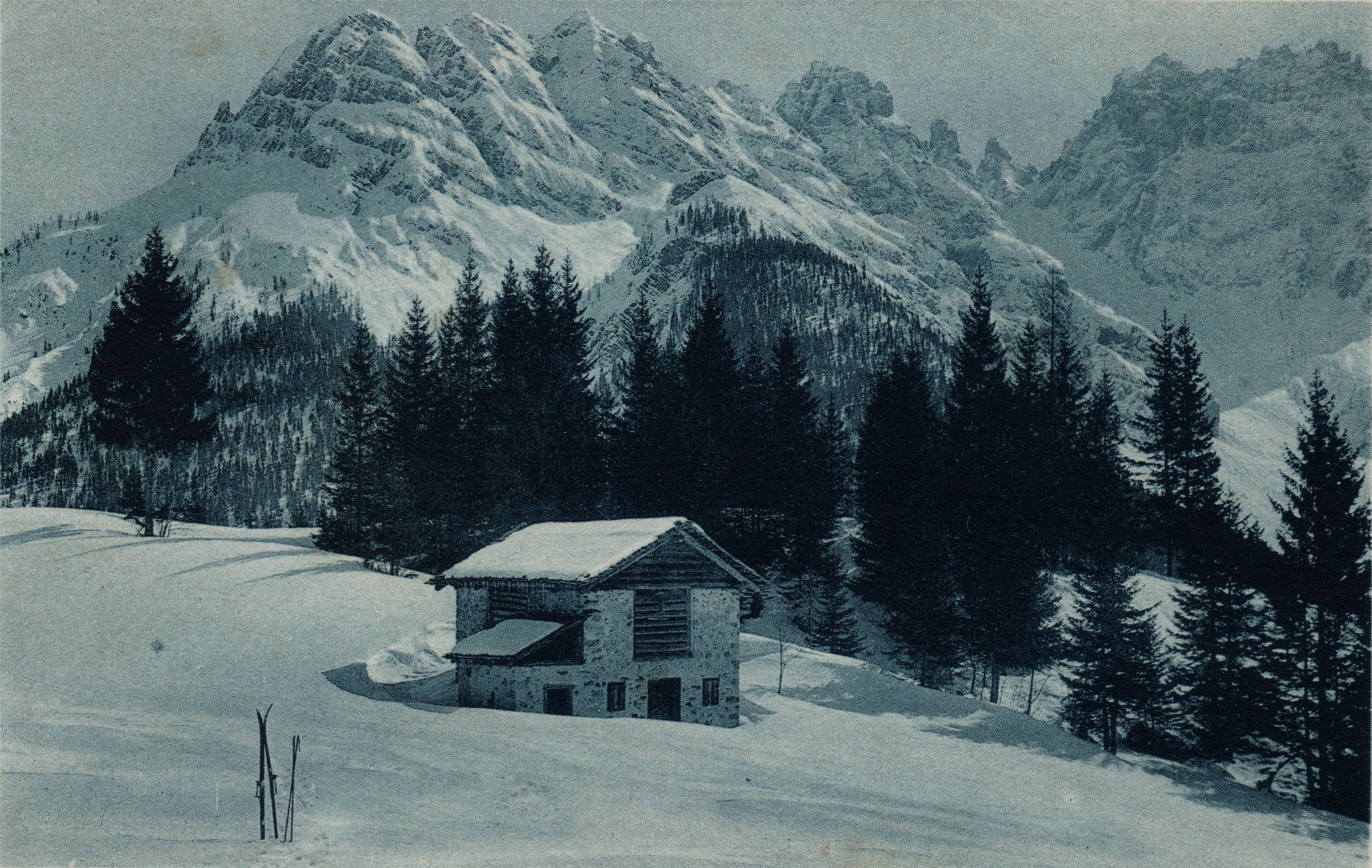
Cridola's valley and Miaron in 1937

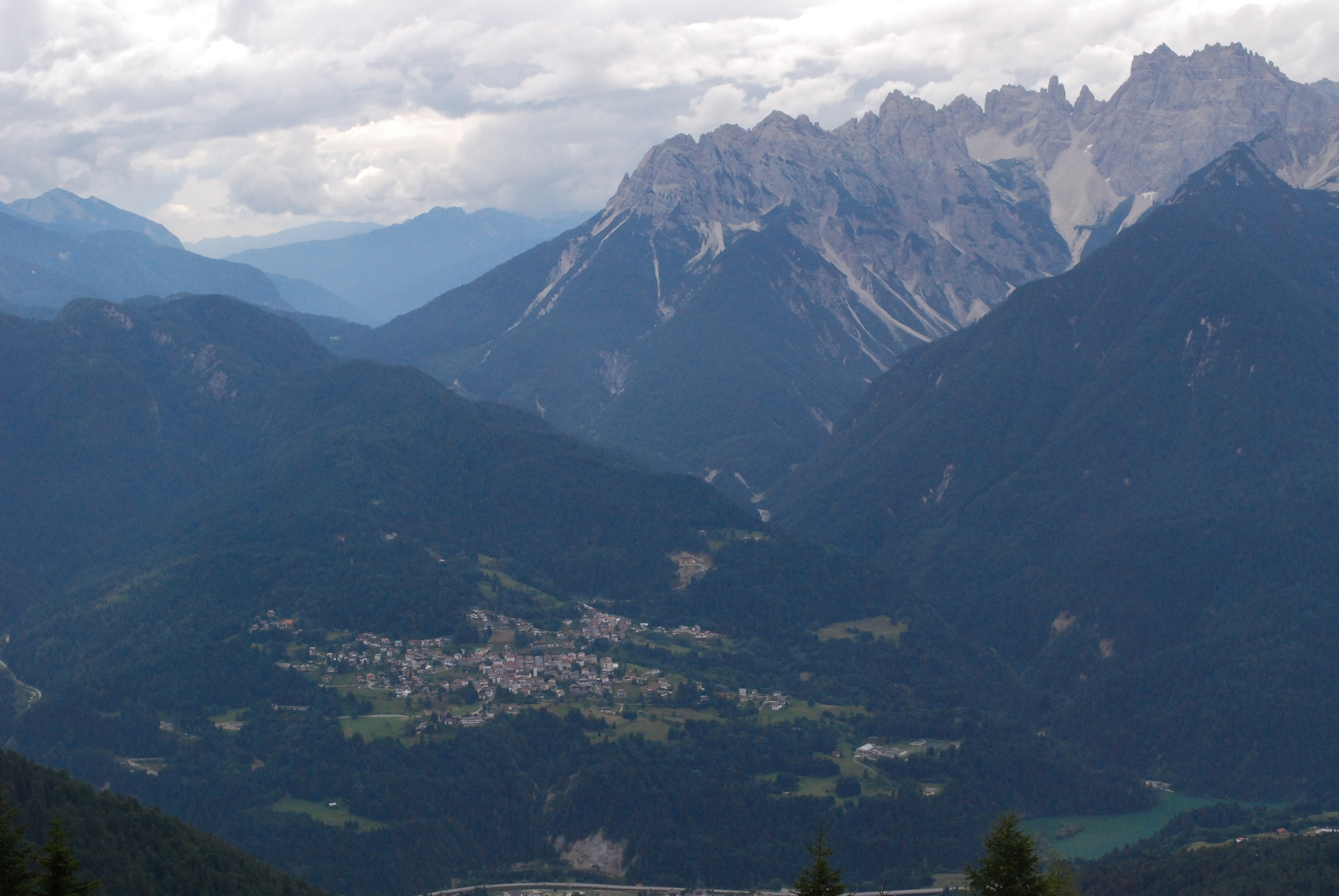
Aerial view of the town

== Demographic evolution ==
Historical population

Year	Pop.	±%
1861	?	—
1871	1,043	—
1881	1,169	+12.1%
1901	1,114	−4.7%
1911	1,196	+7.4%

Year	Pop.	±%
1921	1,080	−9.7%
1931	873	−19.2%
1936	854	−2.2%
1951	775	−9.3%
1961	726	−6.3%

Year	Pop.	±%
1971	675	−7.0%
1981	677	+0.3%
1991	646	−4.6%
2001	578	−10.5%

Source: Data from ISTAT
