= Lozzo di Cadore =

- Comune
- Comune di Lozzo di Cadore
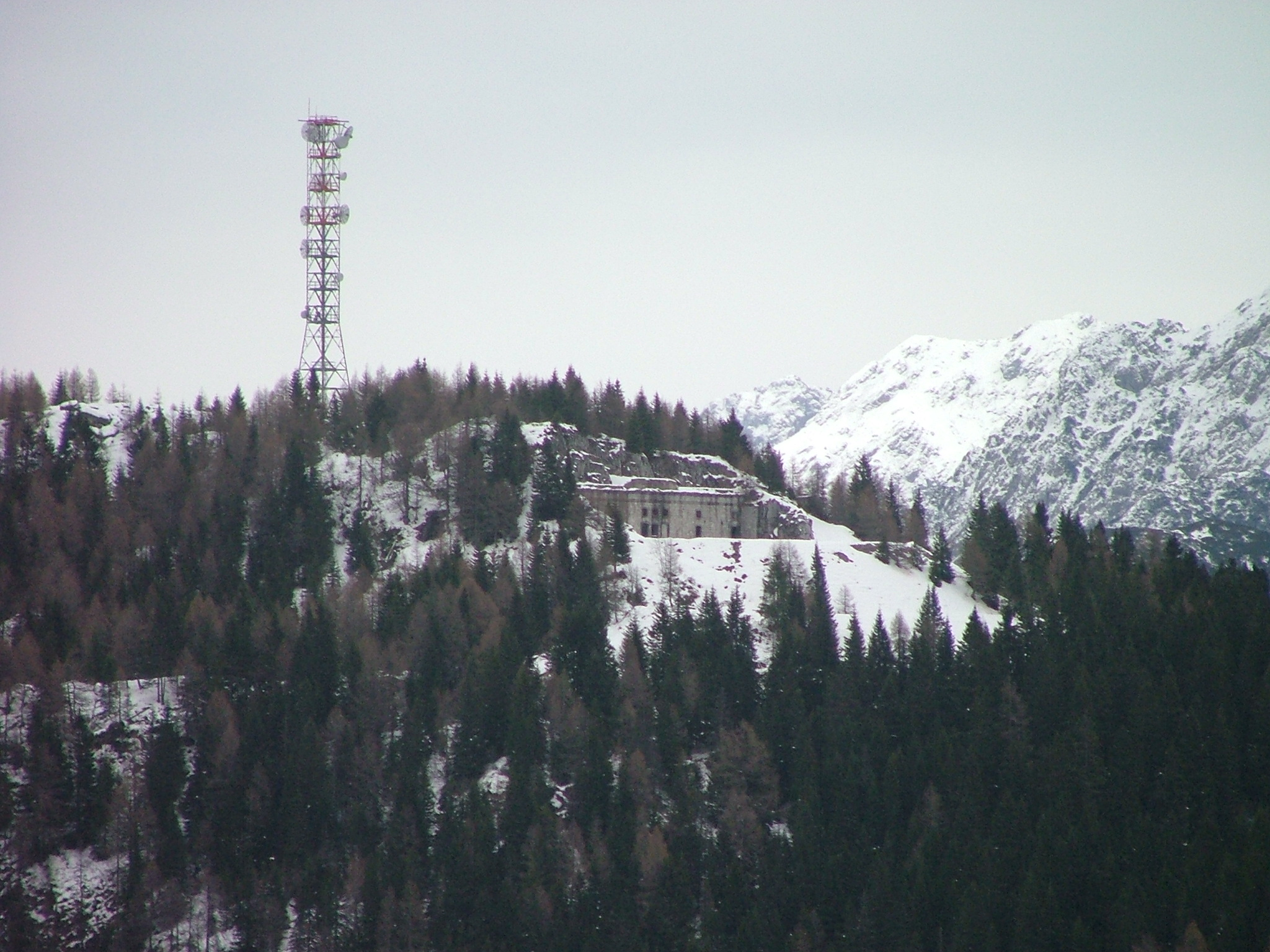

- Location within Italy Location within Veneto
- Coordinates: 46°29′N 12°27′E
- Country: Italy
- Region: Veneto
- Province: Belluno (BL)

Government
  - Mayor: Mario Manfreda

Area
  - Total: 30.4 km^{2} (11.7 sq mi)
- Elevation: 753 m (2,470 ft)

Population (Dec. 2004)
  - Total: 1,653
  - Density: 54.4/km^{2} (141/sq mi)
- Demonym: Lozzesi or Lucensi
- Time zone: UTC+1 (CET)
  - Summer (DST): UTC+2 (CEST)
- Postal code: 32040
- Dialing code: 0435
- Patron saint: St. Lawrence
- Saint day: August 10
- Website: Official website

Lozzo di Cadore is a comune (municipality) in the Province of Belluno in the Italian region of Veneto, located about 120 kilometres (75 mi) north of Venice and about 45 kilometres (28 mi) northeast of Belluno in the Cadore.

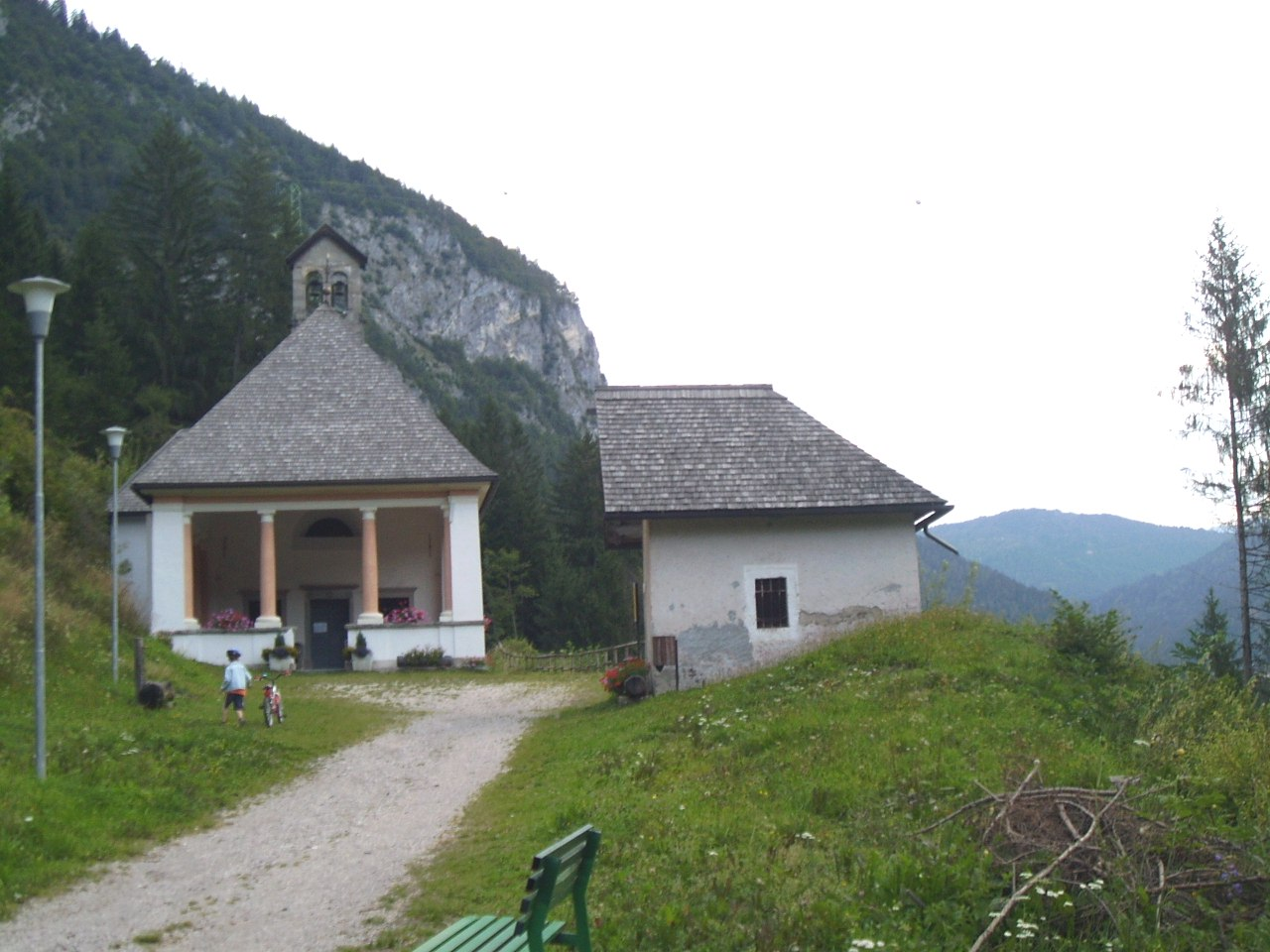
Sanctuary of Madonna di Loreto
