= Lake Alleghe =

Lake in Italy

Coordinates: 46.406°N 12.015°E

Lake Alleghe (Lago d'Alleghe) is a natural lake in the Province of Belluno, Italy. It is situated in the municipalities of Rocca Pietore (west) and Alleghe (east).

The surface is about 0.40 km^{2}. The circumference is around 4.5 km.

location (map)

== History ==
It was created by natural causes in 1771 after a debris flow from Monte Piz with a death toll of 49 people. The river Cordevole was hereby blocked, and thus that water formed the lake.

== Gallery ==
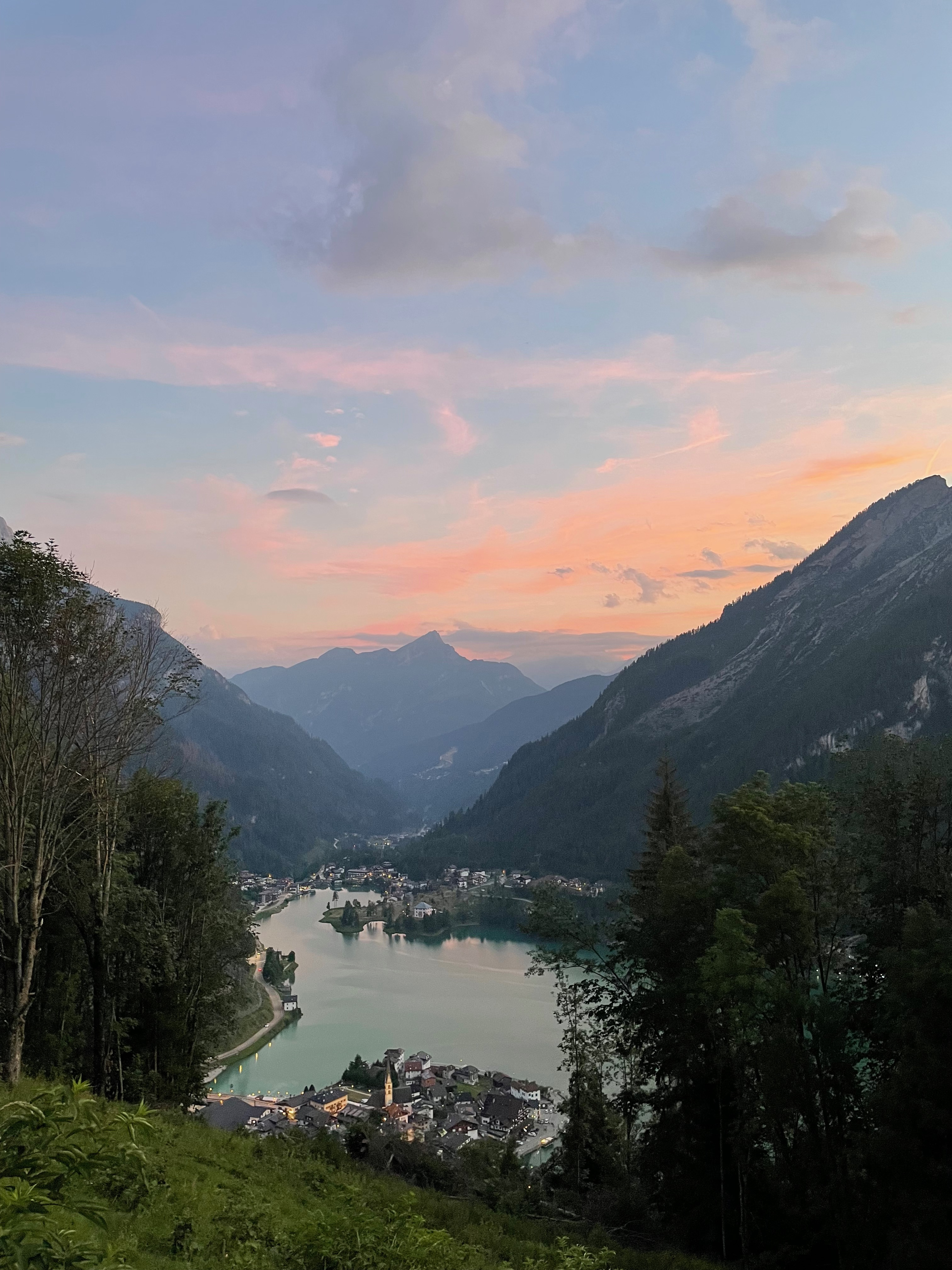

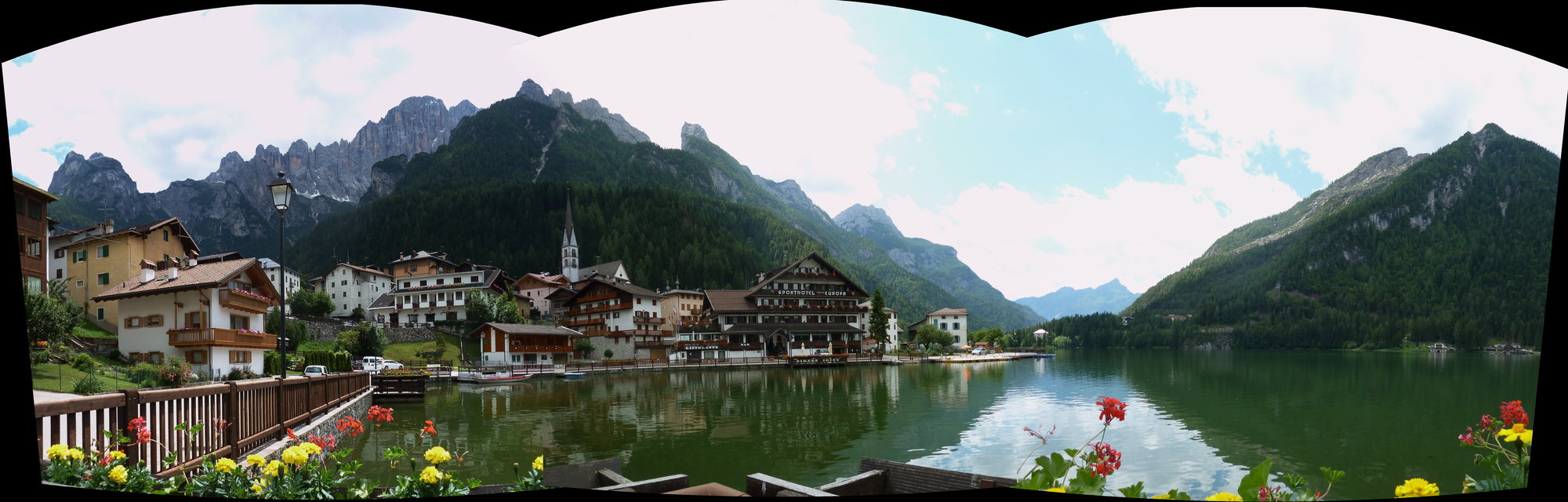

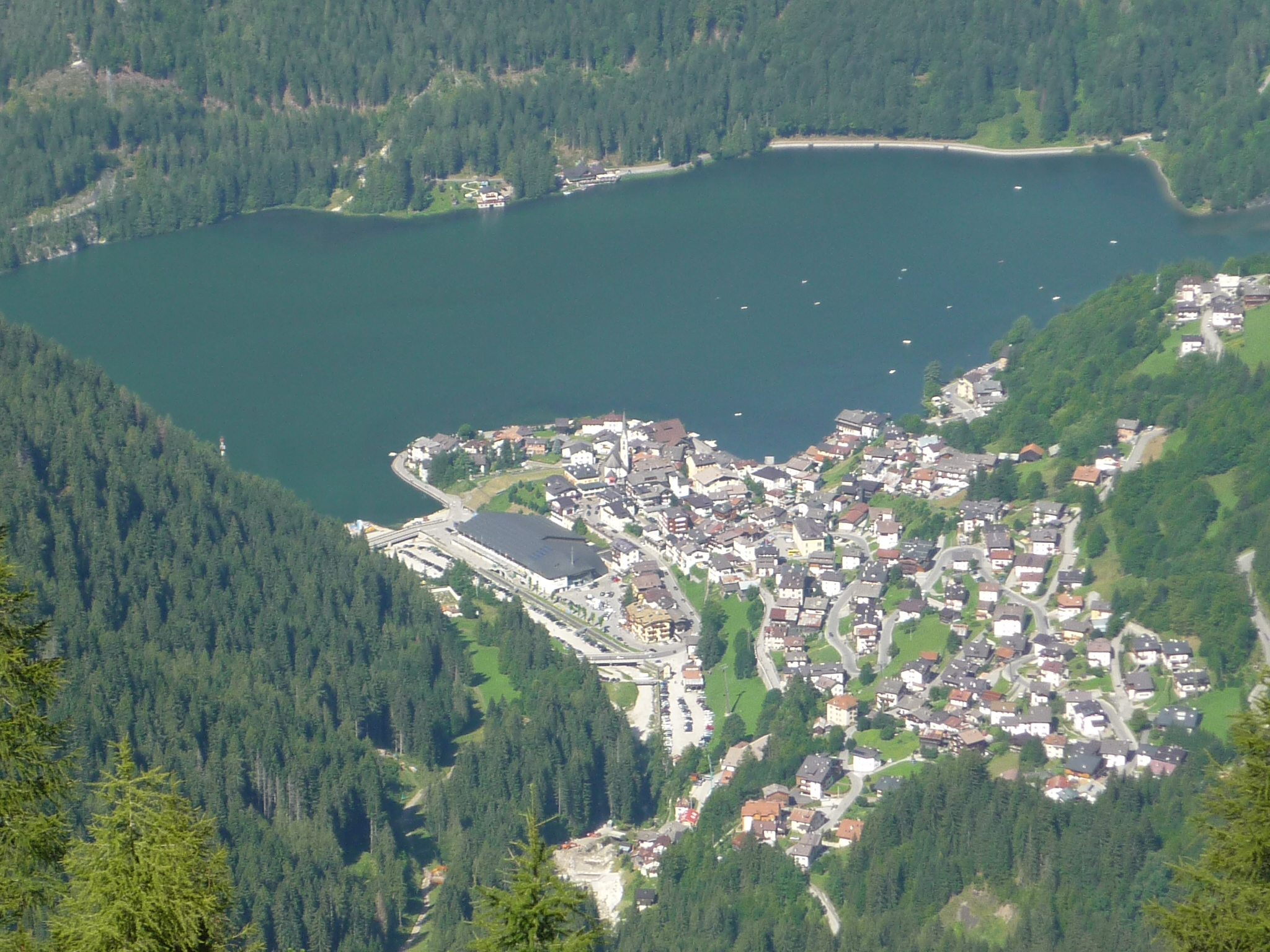
