= Alleghe =

- Comune
- Comune di Alleghe
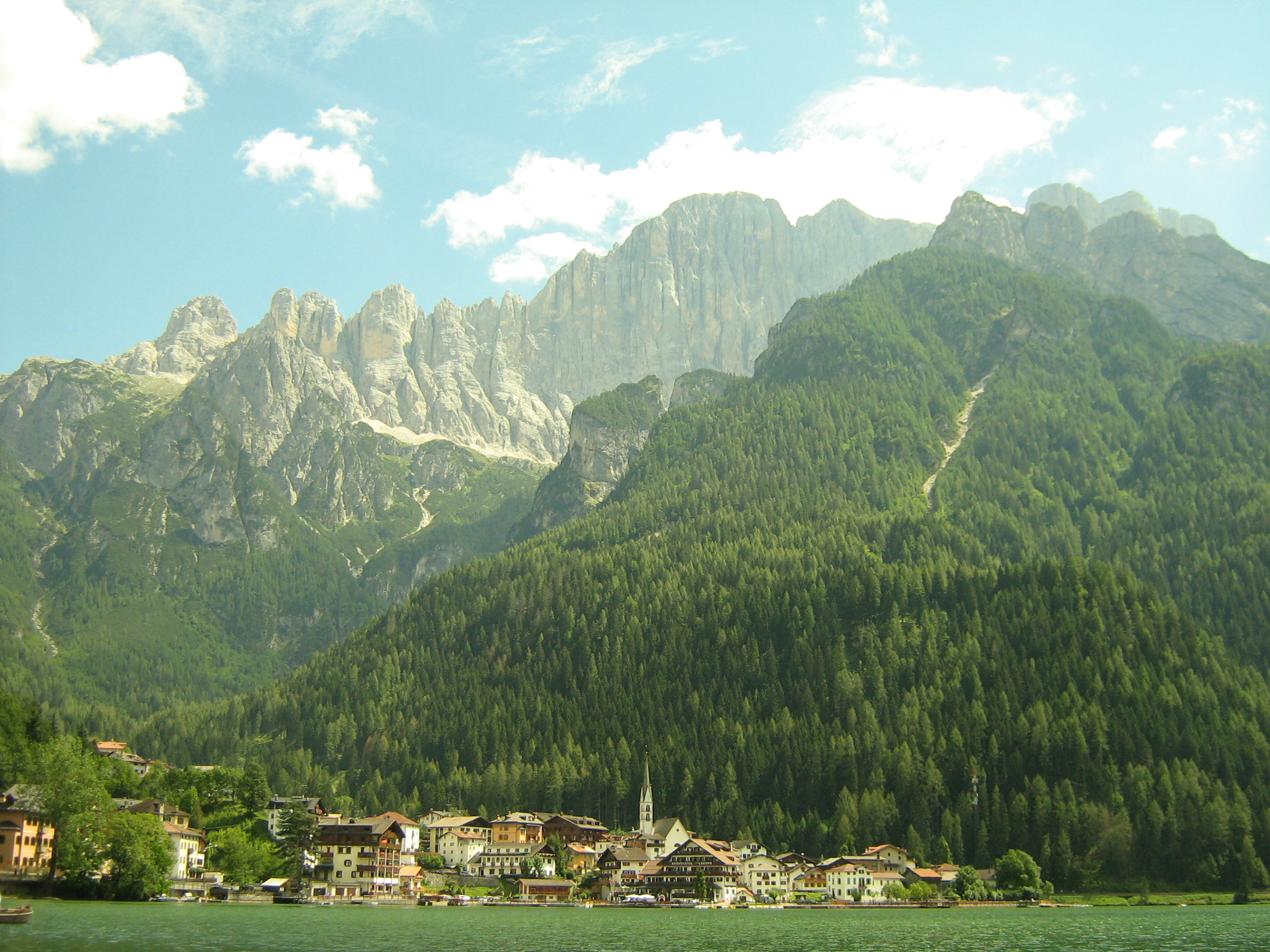
- Alleghe and surrounding mountains

- Location within Italy Location within Veneto
- Coordinates: 46°24′26.45″N 12°1′31.16″E
- Country: Italy
- Region: Veneto
- Province: Province of Belluno (BL)
- Frazioni: Fontanive, Coldemies, Casaril, Cordella (ladin : Cordela), Pradel, Pinié, Coi, Perencina, Col de Fontana, Fernazza (ladin : Fernaza), Scalon, Masarè, La Sala, Tos, Pian, Lagusel, Caprile (ladin : Ciauri)

Area
  - Total: 29 km^{2} (11 sq mi)
- Elevation: 1,000 m (3,300 ft)

Population (31 December 2004)
  - Total: 1,408
  - Density: 49/km^{2} (130/sq mi)
- Demonym: Alleghesi
- Time zone: UTC+1 (CET)
  - Summer (DST): UTC+2 (CEST)
- Postal code: 32022
- Dialing code: 0437
- Patron saint: St. Blaise
- Saint day: 3 February

Alleghe (Ladin: Àlie) is a village and comune in the province of Belluno in the Italian region of Veneto.

To the west Alleghe borders with Lake Alleghe, which was formed in 1771 by a landslide from the adjacent Mont Piz.

== Name ==
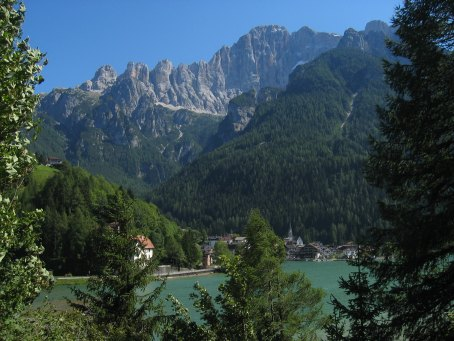
Alleghe and its lake, with Monte Civetta in the background.

Purists of the Italian language would derive the name Alleghe from the Latin alica or alicarius, meaning "granary", but as no grain is grown in this Alpine village, it is most likely that Alleghe is a contraction of the Ladin a l'agua, in reference the deep mountain valley that marked the western boundary of the village prior to the landslide of 1771. A community existed as far back as the 12th century CE.

== Tourism ==
Alleghe's primary industry is tourism. The most popular activities in Alleghe are mountain climbing and skiing.

Monte Civetta (Ladin: Zuita), Alleghe's tallest peak, is a noted climbing spot, rising to a height of 3,220 metres (10,560 ft). In addition, the lake in Alleghe is a popular destination for ice skaters and ice hockey players in the winter. Landmarks also include I misteri di Alleghe, Lago di Alleghe and Stazione meteorologica di Caprile.

== Sport ==
Alleghe is home to HC Alleghe, a professional ice hockey team currently playing in the country's top division, serie B.
They were the surprise winners of the 1992/1993 Alpine League. The stadium in Alleghe is Stadio del ghiaccio Alvise De Toni.

== Gallery ==
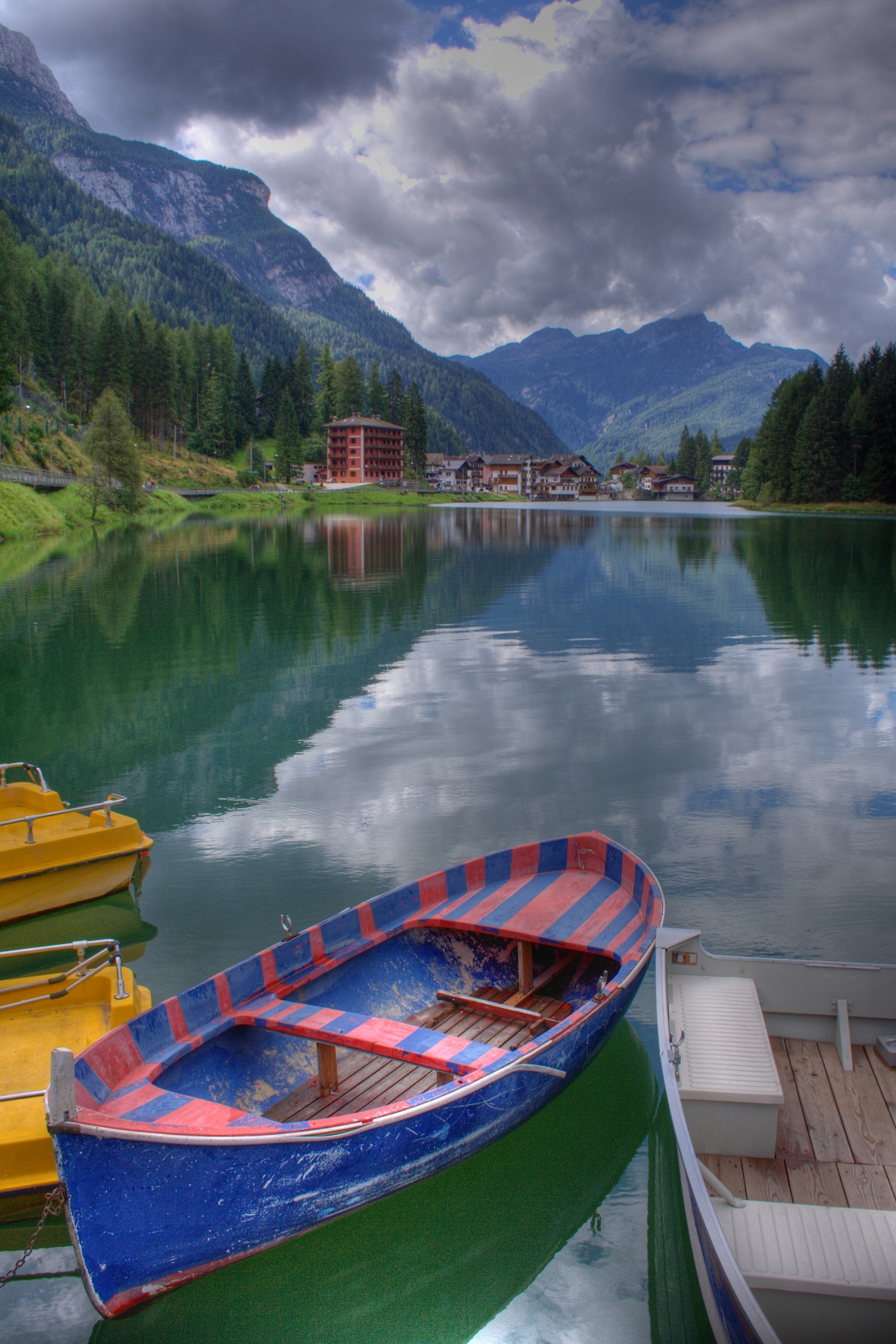

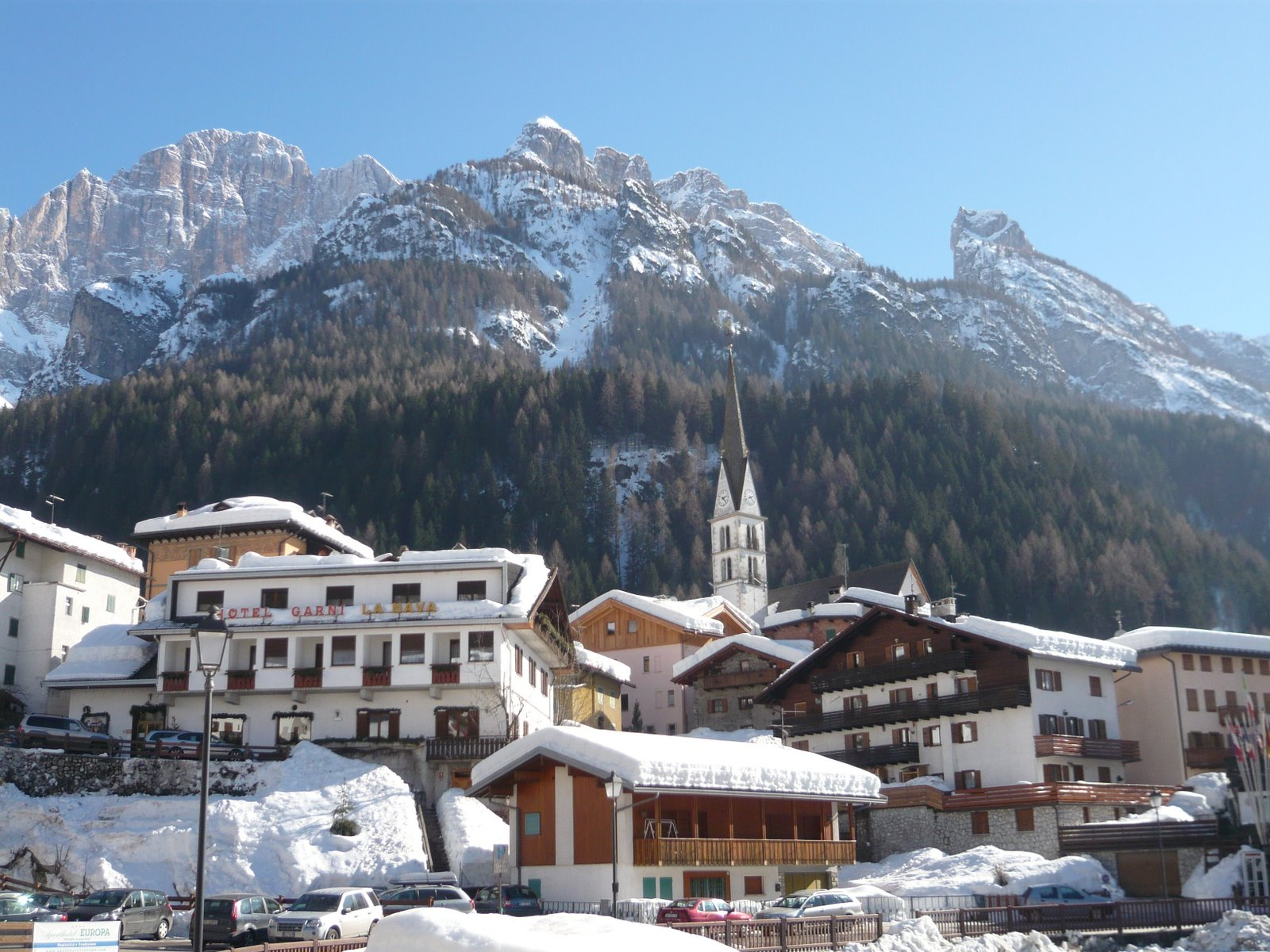

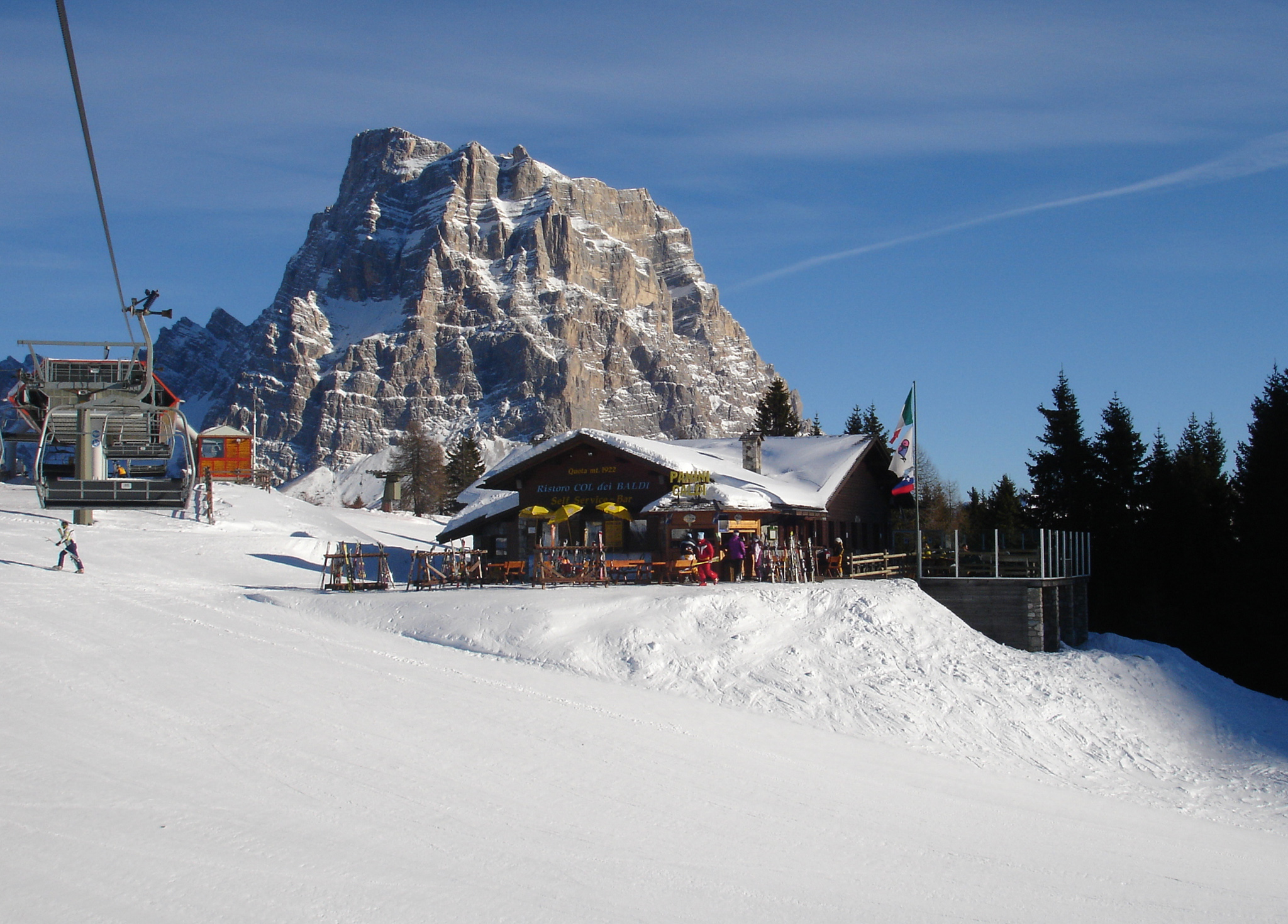

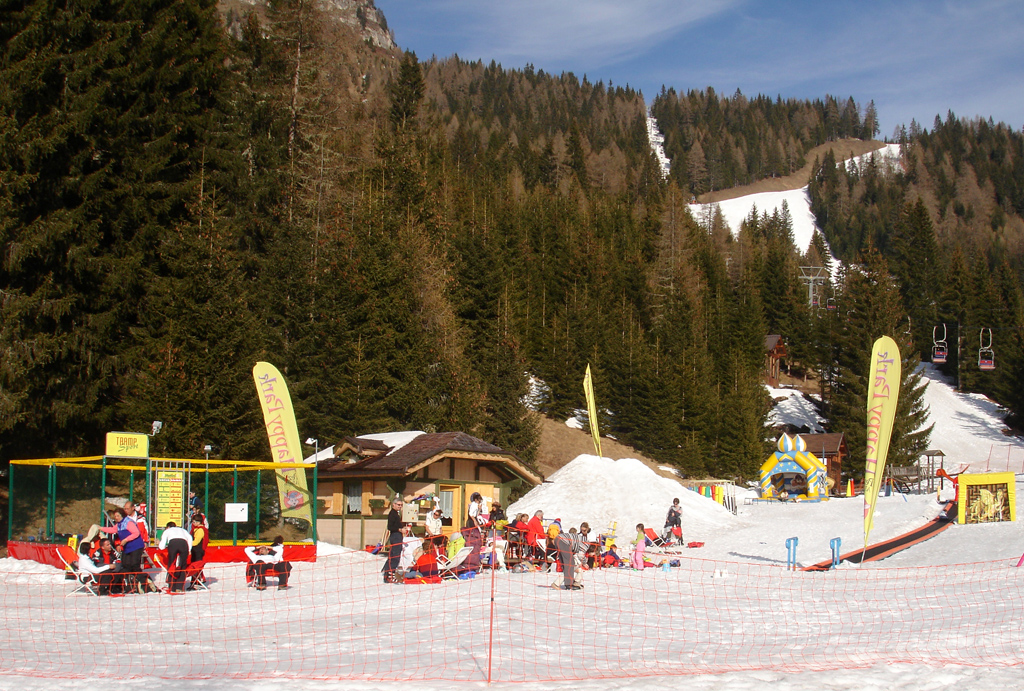

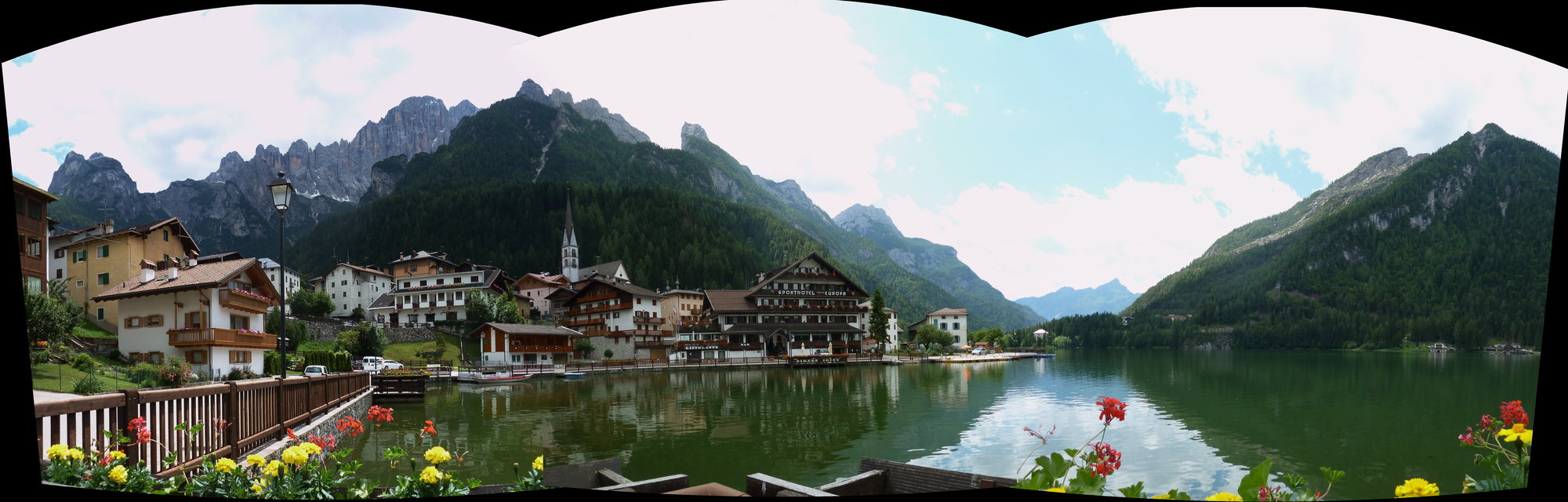

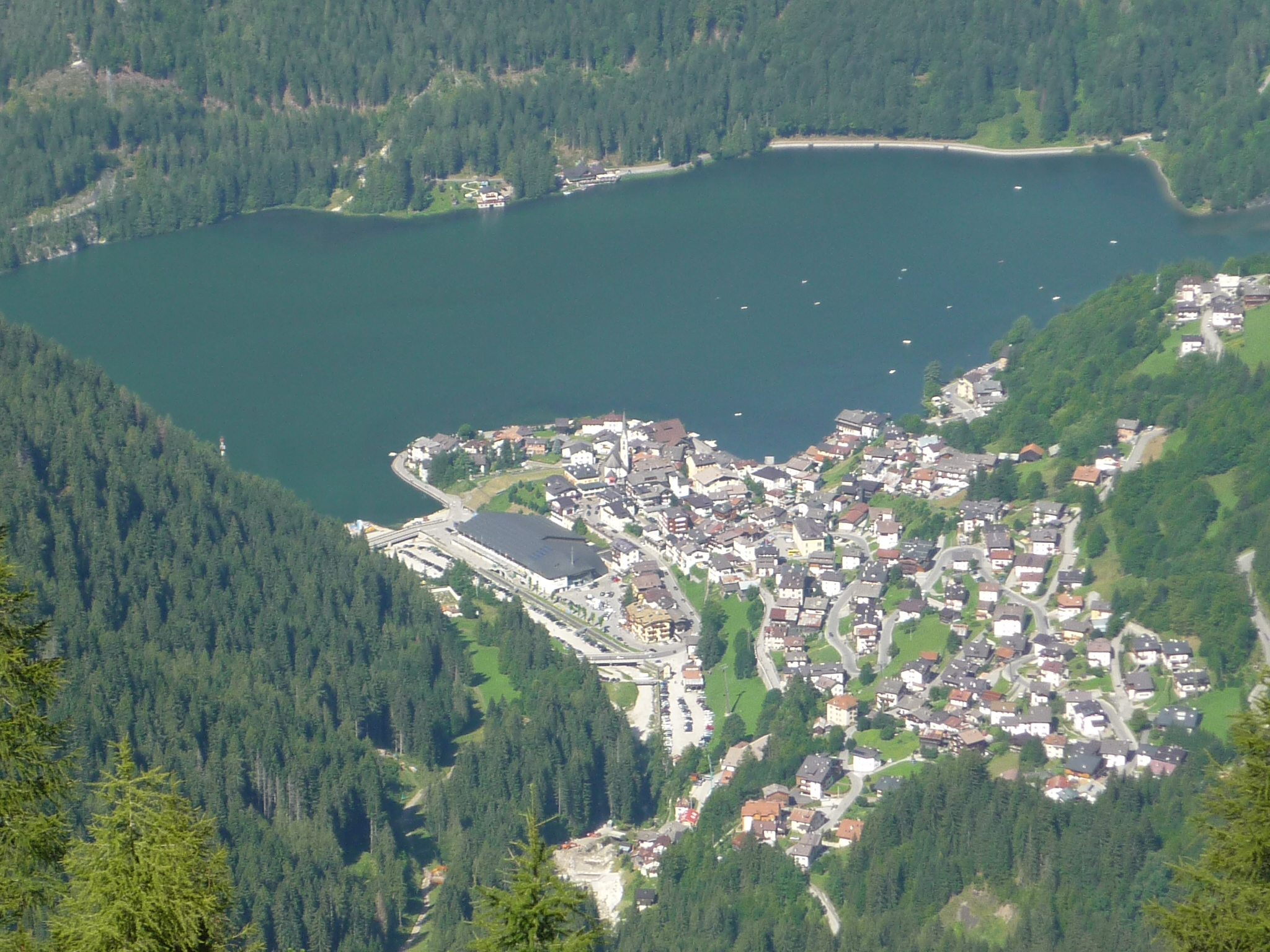
