= Terre d'Adige =

- Comune
- Comune di Terre d'Adige
- Location within Italy Location within Trentino-Alto Adige/Südtirol
- Coordinates: 46°09′29″N 11°04′14″E
- Country: Italy
- Region: Trentino-Alto Adige/Südtirol
- Province: Trentino (TN)

Government
  - Mayor: Fabio Bonadiman

Area
  - Total: 16.6 km^{2} (6.4 sq mi)
- Elevation: 207 m (679 ft)

Population (2021)
  - Total: 3,045
  - Density: 183/km^{2} (475/sq mi)
- Time zone: UTC+1 (CET)
  - Summer (DST): UTC+2 (CEST)
- Postal code: 38097
- Dialing code: 0461
- Website: Official website

Terre d'Adige is a comune (municipality) in Trentino in the northern Italian region Trentino-Alto Adige/Südtirol, located about 9 kilometres (6 mi) north of Trento. As of 1 January 2018, it had a population of 3,138 and an area of 16.58 square kilometres (6.40 mi^{2}).

Terre d'Adige borders the following municipalities: Lavis, Vallelaghi, Andalo, Fai della Paganella, Mezzolombardo and San Michele all'Adige.

The comune was established on 1 January 2019 after the merger of the municipalities of Nave San Rocco and Zambana.
