= Lago di Toblino =

Lake in Trentino, Italy

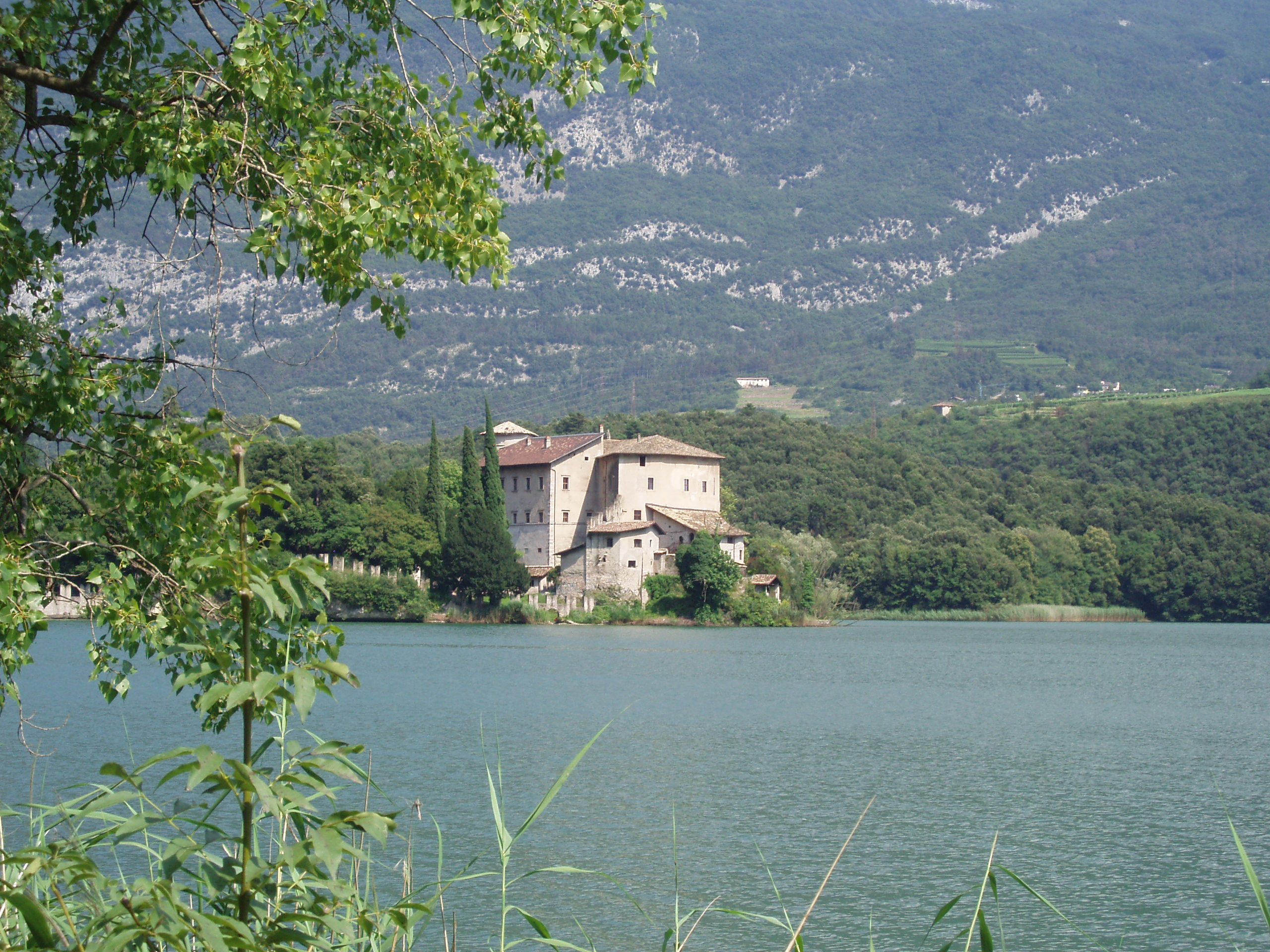
- Lago di Toblino and its castle

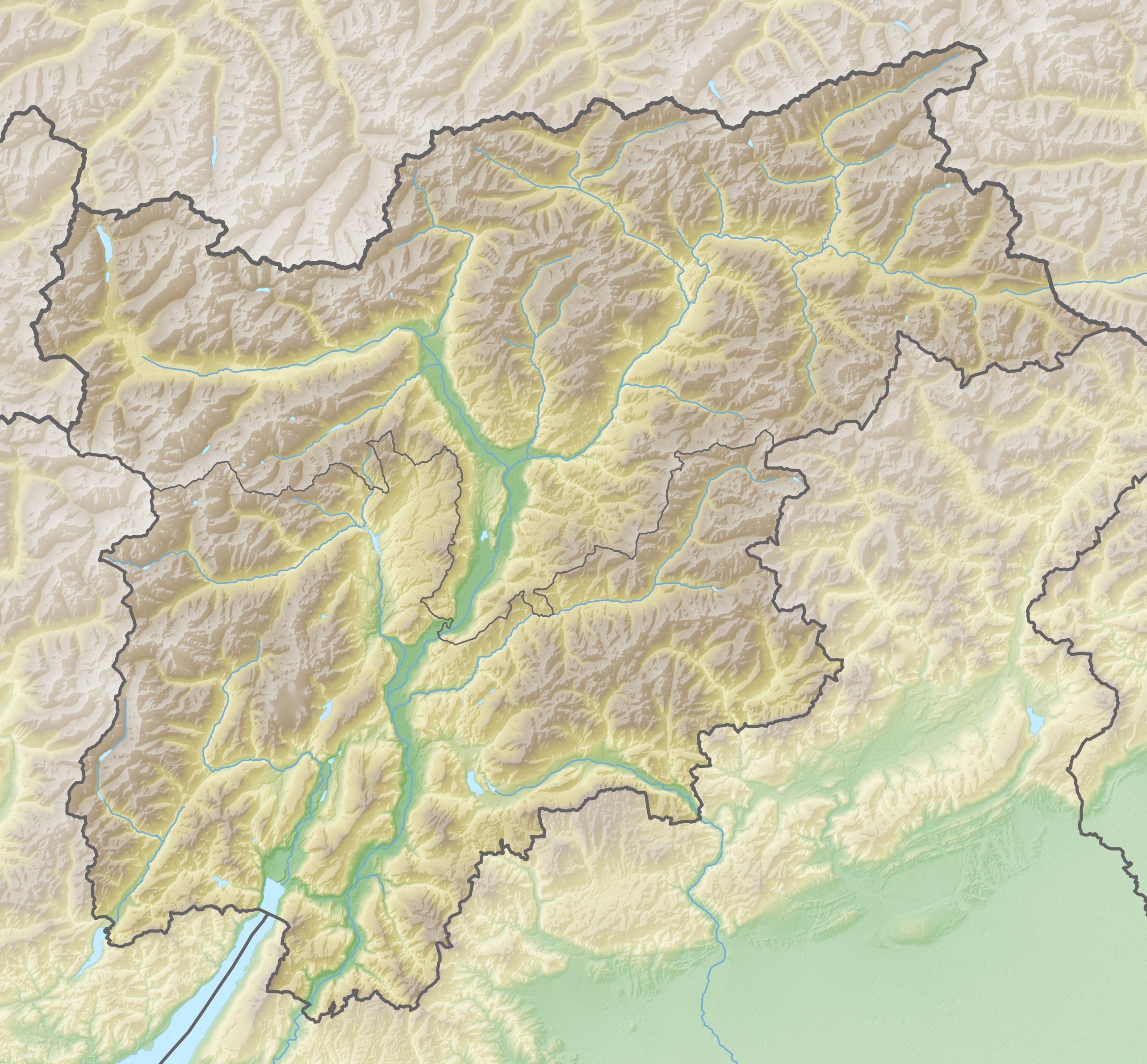
- Location within Trentino-Alto Adige/Südtirol
- Location: Trentino
- Coordinates: 46.05°N 10.96°E
- Primary inflows: Rimon, Rio Val Busa
- Basin countries: Italy
- Surface area: 0.67 km^{2} (0.26 sq mi)
- Surface elevation: 245 m (804 ft)

Lago di Toblino (Tobliner See in German) is a lake in Trentino, Italy. At an elevation of 245 m, its surface area is 0.67 km². The basin is declared — together with the surrounding area — a biotope for both botanical and ethological interests, and is protected by the Autonomous Province of Trento. It occupies the terminal part of the Valle dei Laghi, not far from Trento and the inhabited areas of Padergnone, Sarche, Vezzano and Calavino.

On a promontory located on the northern coast of the lake, stands a castle of medieval origin, called Castel Toblino. The castle is private property and is used as a restaurant.
