= Faedo, Trentino =

Faedo
- Frazione
- Comune di Faedo
- Location of Faedo in Italy
- Coordinates: 46°12′N 11°10′E
- Country: Italy
- Region: Trentino-Alto Adige/Südtirol
- Province: Trentino (TN)

Area
  - Total: 10.6 km^{2} (4.1 sq mi)

Population (Dec. 2004)
  - Total: 566
  - Density: 53.4/km^{2} (138/sq mi)
- Time zone: UTC+1 (CET)
  - Summer (DST): UTC+2 (CEST)
- Postal code: 38010
- Dialing code: 0461

Faedo (Faé in local dialect) was a comune (municipality) in Trentino in the northern Italian region Trentino-Alto Adige/Südtirol, located about 25 kilometres (16 mi) north of Trento. Faedo was annexed to the municipality of San Michele all'Adige as of 1 January 2020. As of 31 December 2004, it had a population of 566 and an area of 10.6 square kilometres (4.1 mi^{2}).

Faedo borders the following municipalities: Mezzocorona, Giovo and Salorno.

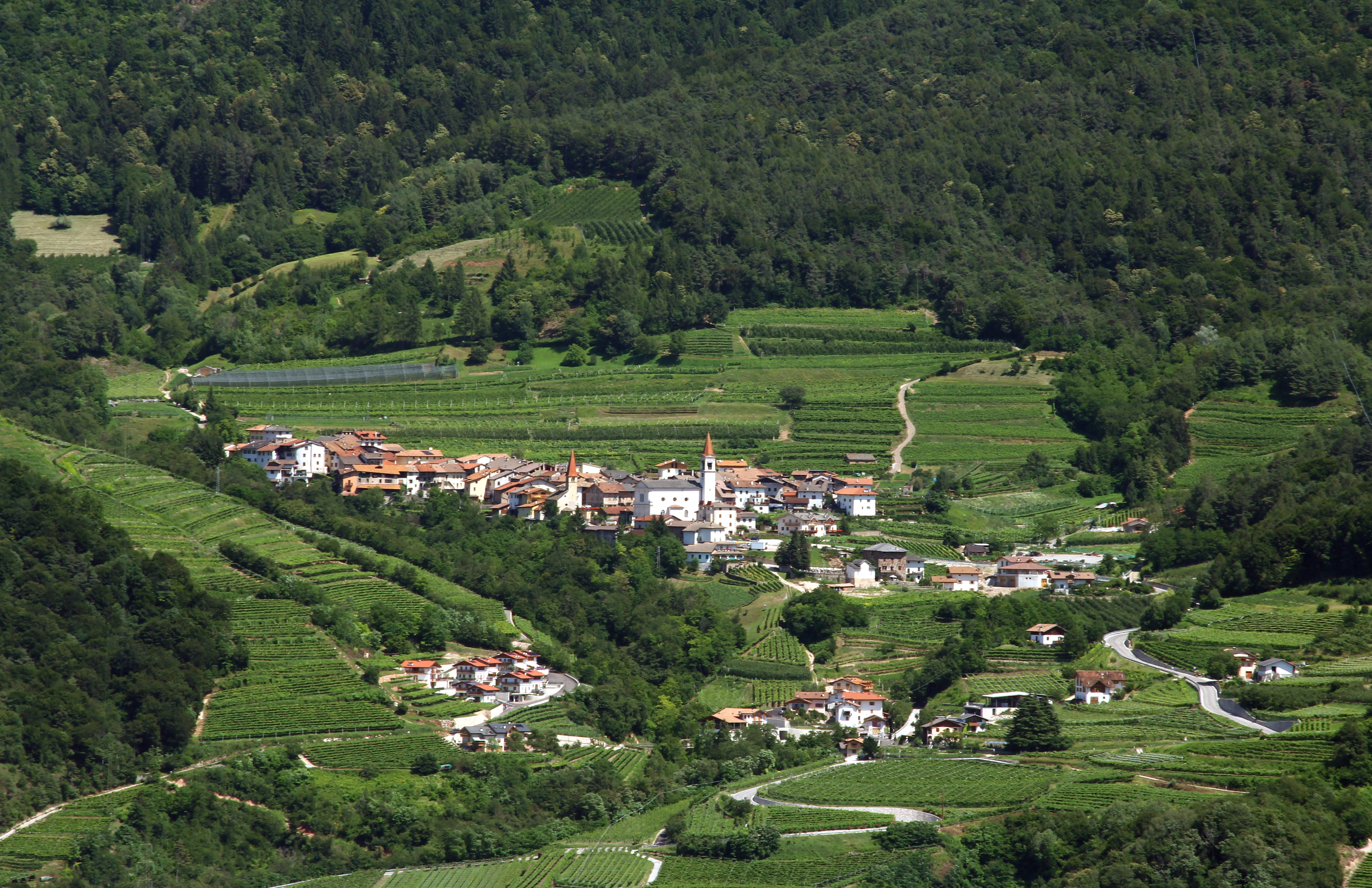
Faedo view from west

== Demographic evolution ==
Historical population

Year	Pop.	±%
1861	?	—
1871	?	—
1881	?	—
1901	?	—
1911	?	—

Year	Pop.	±%
1921	753	—
1931	715	−5.0%
1936	651	−9.0%
1951	632	−2.9%
1961	560	−11.4%

Year	Pop.	±%
1971	464	−17.1%
1981	443	−4.5%
1991	538	+21.4%
2001	554	+3.0%

Source: Data from ISTAT
