= History of Trentino =

History of Trentino, Italy

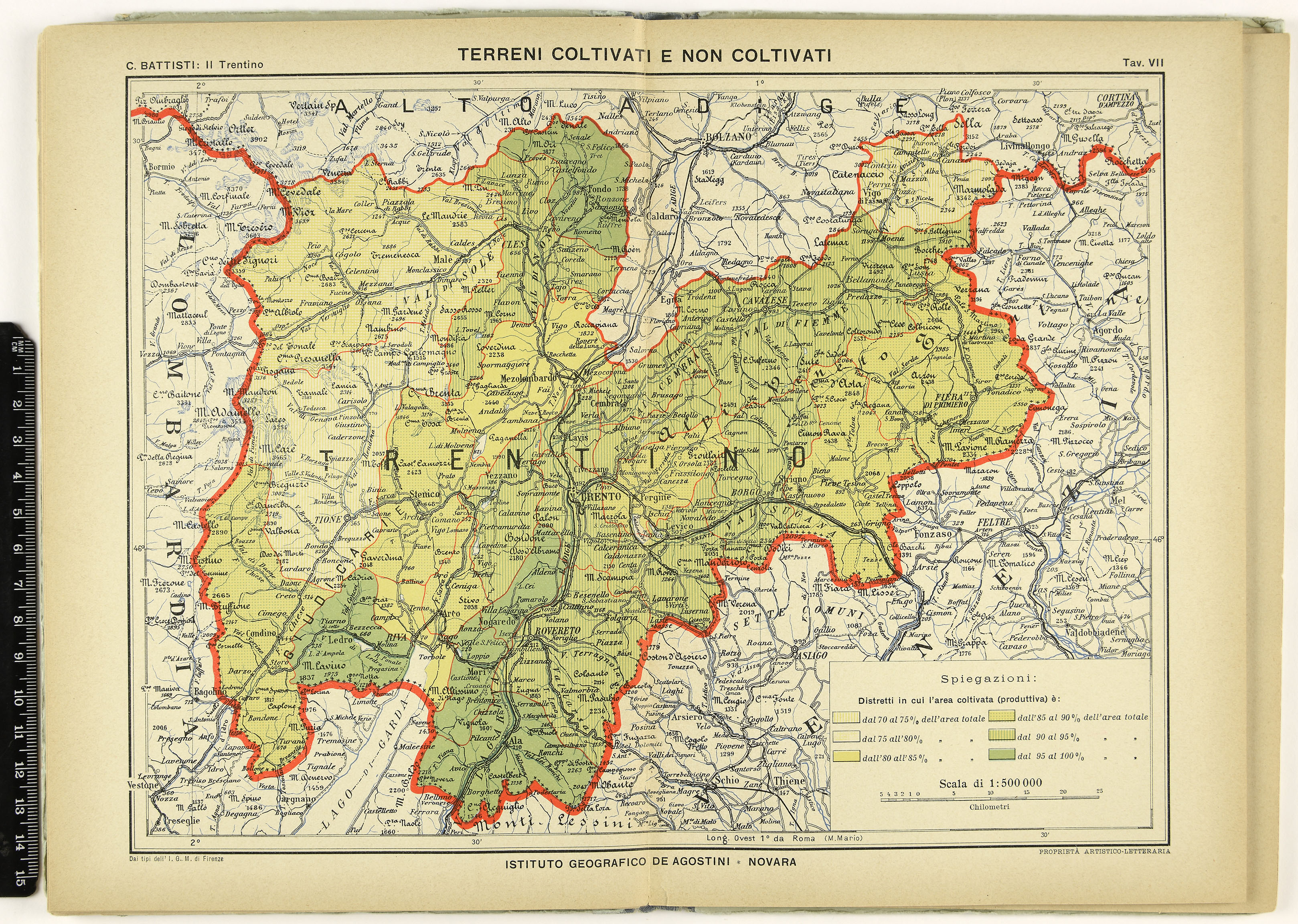
Trentino in early 1900s

The History of Trentino begins in the mid-Stone Age and continues to the present day when Trentino is part of the Italian Republic.

== Ancient history ==
During the Stone age the valleys of what is now Trentino were already inhabited by humans, the main settlements being in the valley of the Adige River, thanks to its milder climate. Research suggests that the first settlers (probably hunters) came from the Padana Plain and the Venetian Prealps, after the first glaciers began melting at the end of the Pleistocene glaciations.

Findings (in particular, burials) from the Mesolithic period have been found in several parts of the province. These include the comuni of Zambana and Mezzocorona. A large area of a hunting-based settlement from the Neolithic period has been found near the lakes of Colbricòn, not far from the Rolle Pass.

Around 500 BC, the Raetians appeared in the Trentine area, coming from the Central and Eastern Alps area. They settled in several valleys and brought new skills on top of the traditional hunting: agriculture (grapes, vegetables, cereals), breeding (ovines, goats, bovines and horses). During the Roman Age, part of the current Trentino-Alto Adige/Südtirol region made up the province of Raetia.

This region was totally conquered by the Romans in the 1st century BC. The definitive defeat of the Rhaetians, near Bolzano, occurred during the military campaigns in the Alps of Drusus and Tiberius (16-17 BC). Trento became a Roman municipium in the 40s BC. During the reign of Emperor Claudius (41-54 AD) Trentino was integrated into the Imperial road network with the construction of the Via Claudia Augusta Padana (from Ostiglia to the Resia Pass) and the Via Augusta Altinate (from Treviso to Trento, passing through the Valsugana). Claudius also issued an Edict, contained in the Tabula clesiana, which extended Roman citizenship to the residents of this region. By the fourth century the area was fully latinisated.

== Bishopric of Trent ==
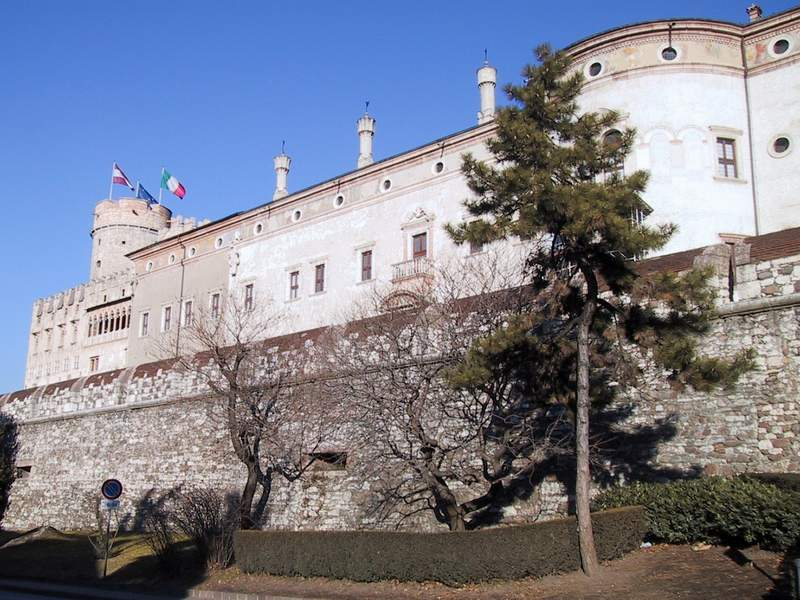
The Prince-Bishops of Trent ruled the region from Buonconsiglio Castle since the 13th century

During the Late Antiquity, in the 5th century AD, Trentino was invaded several times, from North and East: first by the Ostrogoths, then by the Bavarians and Byzantines and finally by the Lombards. With the latter's domination, an idea of the territorial identity of the province began to take shape (Tridentinum territorium). In the same century, the region became largely Christianized. In 774 Trentino was conquered by the Franks and became part of the Kingdom of Italy, a sometimes vague entity included in what was to become the Holy Roman Empire.

The first territorial unity of Trentino dates back to 1027, when emperor Conrad II officially gave the rule of the area to the Bishopric of Trent. This entity survived for some eight centuries and granted Trentino a certain autonomy, first from the Holy Roman Empire and then from the Austrian Empire.

== Part of Austria ==
In the early 19th century some of the Trentine people participated actively in the resistance, led by the Tyrolean Andreas Hofer, against the French invasion.

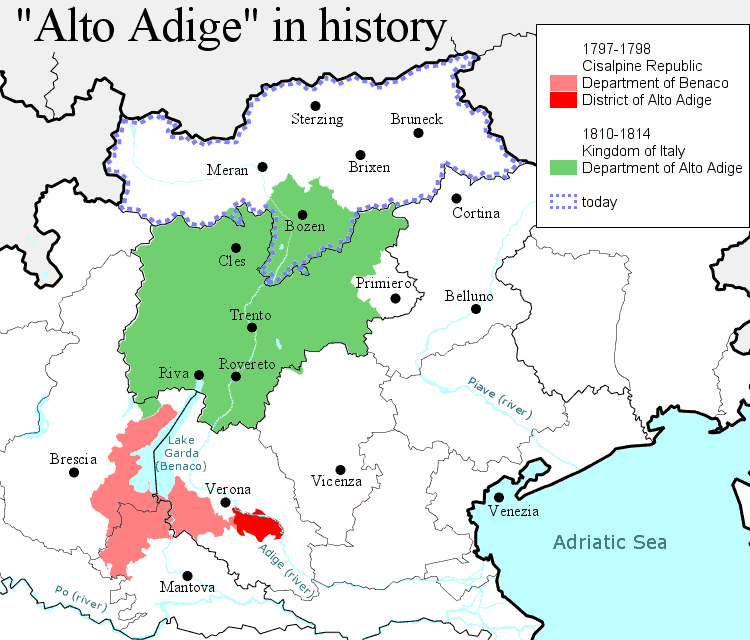
Trentino (green area) was part of the "Alto Adige Department" under Napoleon

Napoleon created in 1810 the Department of Alto Adige that included most of the present Trentino and the area around Bolzano in Alto Adige. It was part of Napoleon's Kingdom of Italy for some years.

After the end of the Napoleonic era (1815), the Bishopric of Trent was dissolved and Trentino became part of the County of Tyrol, in which the majority of the population was German-speaking. Though relatively well administered, and despite the presence of Trentine representatives in the Diets of Innsbruck and Vienna, in the second half of the 19th century a movement (part of the general movement called Italian irredentism) arose with the aim of annexing all the region (south of the Alps watershed) to the Kingdom of Italy: this, however, was largely put forward by intellectuals like Cesare Battisti and Fabio Filzi, and met some support by the predominantly rural population.

Given the area's strategic importance in the event of a war between Austria-Hungary and Italy, the Austro-Hungarians strengthened their troop levels there and fortified the area in the early twentieth century. Under the authority of the Austro-Hungarian chief of staff Franz Conrad von Hötzendorf, modern, armored fortifications were built in the areas around Lavarone and Folgaria; their dual purpose was to protect against an Italian attack and to secure the area as a staging ground for an Austrian assault on Northern Italy.

After Italy entered the First World War in 1915, the Trentine territory was an important front between Italy and Austria-Hungary, and suffered heavy destruction. After the call to arms summoned by Emperor Franz Joseph I of Austria on July 31, 1914, more than 55,000 Trentini fought for Austria, first against Russia and Serbia and, starting from 1915, also against Italians. Despite the fact that they were fighting against Italian soldiers (Trentini soldiers spoke Italian) desertion cases were extremely low. More than 10,000 of them died, and many others were wounded or made prisoners. Further, hundreds of thousands of civilians were forced to abandon their native area when they were too near to the front lines. Many of them, captured by the Italian Army, were later transferred to Southern Italy as colonists.

== Union to Italy ==
With the Treaty of Saint-Germain (1919), Trentino was united to Italy, together with the new Province of Bolzano/Bozen (South Tyrol), as part of Venezia Tridentina. The centralization process brought on by the Fascists reduced the autonomy that cities like Trento or Rovereto had enjoyed under the preceding Liberal governments, while many of the smaller comuni were united, reducing their number from the 366 under the Habsburg to 127.

== Autonomy ==
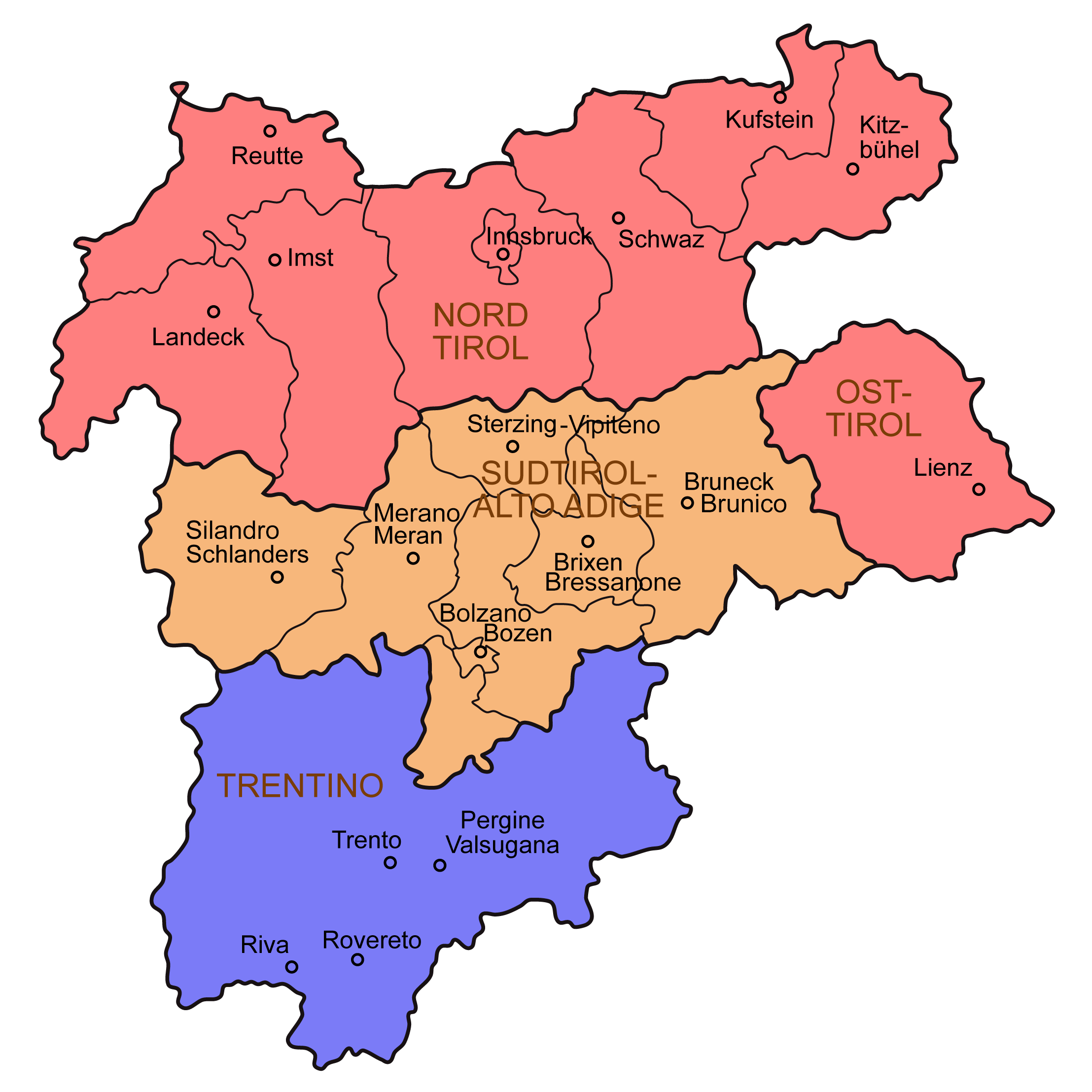
Detailed map of the Euroregion Tyrol-South Tyrol-Trentino, formed by the Austrian state of Tyrol and the Italian autonomous provinces of South Tyrol and Trentino.

After World War II, the treaty signed by the Italian and Austrian Ministers of Foreign affairs, Alcide De Gasperi and Karl Gruber, the autonomous Region of Trentino-Alto Adige/Südtirol was created (see Gruber-De Gasperi Agreement).

In the following decades the main party in Trentino was the Christian Democracy, while autonomistic instances found their voice in the Partito Popolare Trentino Tirolese (Trentine-Tyrolese Popular Party). In 1957 strife between Trentino and the largely German-speaking South Tyrol led to the popularity of the slogan Los von Trient ("Away from Trento"). In 1972 the regional administration was handed over to the two provinces.

In the 1960s and 1970s Trentino witnessed strong economic development, spurred mainly by the tourism sector and by the new autonomy. It is currently one of the richest and best developed Italian provinces.

In 1996, the Euroregion Tyrol-South Tyrol-Trentino was formed between the Austrian state of Tyrol and the Italian provinces of South Tyrol and Trentino. The boundaries of the association correspond to the old County of Tyrol. The aim is to promote regional peace, understanding and cooperation in many areas. The region's assemblies meet together as one on various occasions and have set up a common liaison office to the European Union in Brussels.
