= Paganella =

Mountain in Italy

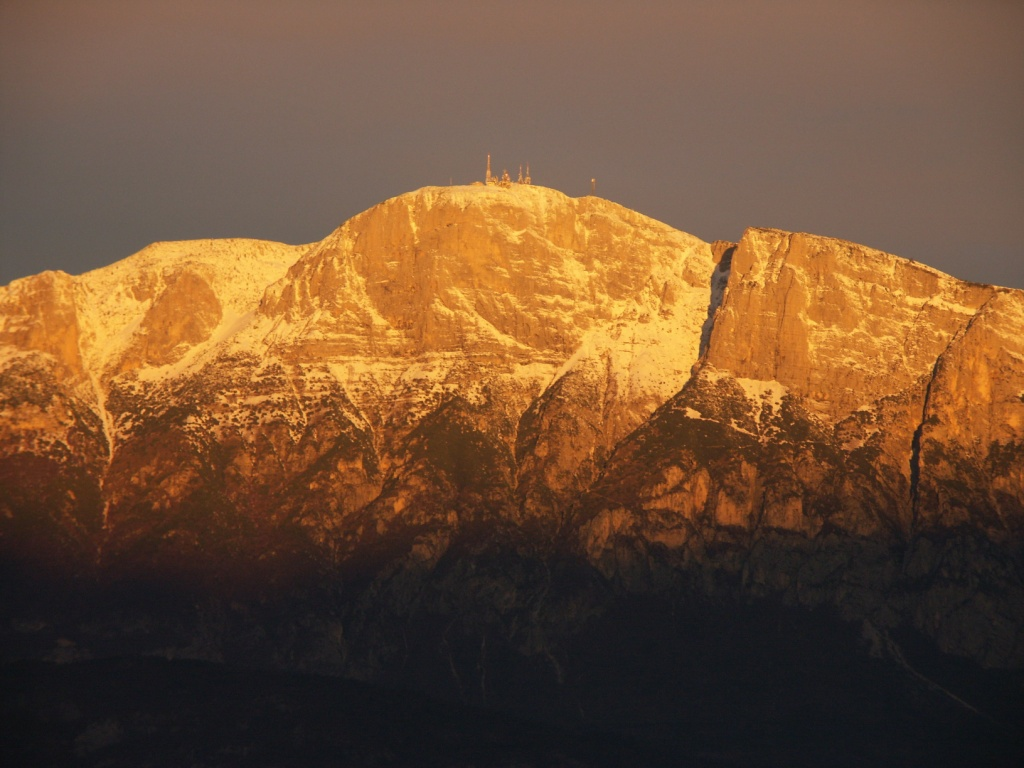
- Paganella at dawn, seen from Povo

Highest point
- Elevation: 2,124 m (6,969 ft)
- Prominence: 1,099 m (3,606 ft)
- Coordinates: 46°10′00″N 11°04′00″E

Geography
- Location within Alps
- Location: Trentino, Italy
- Parent range: Brenta Group, Rhaetian Alps

Paganella is a mountain of the Brenta Group in Trentino, northern Italy. It is located in the territories of the comuni of Fai della Paganella, Andalo, Molveno, Zambana and Terlago. Overlooking Trento from north-west, it consists of a short range/plateau with a highest elevation of 2,125 m (Roda Peak).

The slopes above Andalo and Fai are rich in vegetation and also houses several ski resorts, while the other descends towards the Adige river are steeper and rockier.

== Climate ==
Due to altitude, the climate is subarctic (Köppen: Dfc/Dwc), similar to other high mountains in the Alps. The annual average temperature is 2.6 °C (36.7 °F), the hottest month in July is 11.2 °C (52.2 °F), and the coldest month is −4.7 °C (23.5 °F) in February. The annual precipitation is 823.81 millimetres (32.43 in), of which October is the wettest with 124.48 millimetres (4.90 in), while January is the driest with only 17.31 millimetres (0.68 in).

Climate data for Paganella (ridge), elevation: 2,129 m or 6,985 ft, 1991-2020 normals, extremes 1956–present
Month	Jan	Feb	Mar	Apr	May	Jun	Jul	Aug	Sep	Oct	Nov	Dec	Year
Record high °C (°F)	9.1 (48.4)	12.4 (54.3)	11.1 (52.0)	13.4 (56.1)	19.0 (66.2)	23.6 (74.5)	25.0 (77.0)	23.4 (74.1)	21.0 (69.8)	15.8 (60.4)	13.4 (56.1)	11.7 (53.1)	25.0 (77.0)
Mean daily maximum °C (°F)	−2.2 (28.0)	−2.5 (27.5)	0.0 (32.0)	2.9 (37.2)	8.1 (46.6)	12.8 (55.0)	14.9 (58.8)	14.5 (58.1)	9.9 (49.8)	5.8 (42.4)	1.2 (34.2)	−1.3 (29.7)	5.4 (41.7)
Daily mean °C (°F)	−4.3 (24.3)	−4.7 (23.5)	−2.5 (27.5)	0.3 (32.5)	4.8 (40.6)	9.1 (48.4)	11.2 (52.2)	11.1 (52.0)	6.9 (44.4)	3.4 (38.1)	−0.8 (30.6)	−3.5 (25.7)	2.6 (36.7)
Mean daily minimum °C (°F)	−6.5 (20.3)	−7.0 (19.4)	−4.9 (23.2)	−2.1 (28.2)	1.9 (35.4)	5.9 (42.6)	8.0 (46.4)	8.2 (46.8)	4.5 (40.1)	1.3 (34.3)	−2.8 (27.0)	−5.7 (21.7)	0.1 (32.2)
Record low °C (°F)	−23.6 (−10.5)	−23.3 (−9.9)	−24.3 (−11.7)	−14.8 (5.4)	−11.4 (11.5)	−5.4 (22.3)	−2.7 (27.1)	−1.9 (28.6)	−5.9 (21.4)	−10.8 (12.6)	−15.8 (3.6)	−19.1 (−2.4)	−24.3 (−11.7)
Average precipitation mm (inches)	17.3 (0.68)	53.4 (2.10)	30.0 (1.18)	41.8 (1.65)	83.4 (3.28)	93.8 (3.69)	101.0 (3.98)	95.4 (3.76)	90.4 (3.56)	124.5 (4.90)	66.2 (2.61)	26.5 (1.04)	823.8 (32.43)
Average precipitation days (≥ 1.0 mm)	2.10	2.90	3.90	6.67	9.45	9.62	10.00	8.93	7.37	7.07	6.43	3.60	78.04
Average relative humidity (%)	63.3	65.5	70.2	76.3	77.3	76.9	76.5	77.6	78.6	75.8	73.0	65.0	73.0
Average dew point °C (°F)	−11.2 (11.8)	−11.1 (12.0)	−7.7 (18.1)	−3.5 (25.7)	1.1 (34.0)	5.2 (41.4)	7.1 (44.8)	7.3 (45.1)	3.4 (38.1)	−1.0 (30.2)	−5.9 (21.4)	−10.4 (13.3)	−2.2 (28.0)
Mean monthly sunshine hours	190.3	202.2	228.8	214.8	232.5	223.2	247.4	238.1	209.1	210.8	178.2	173.0	2,548.3
Source 1: NOAA
Source 2: Temperature estreme in Toscana
