= Saveria Chemotti =

Italian writer

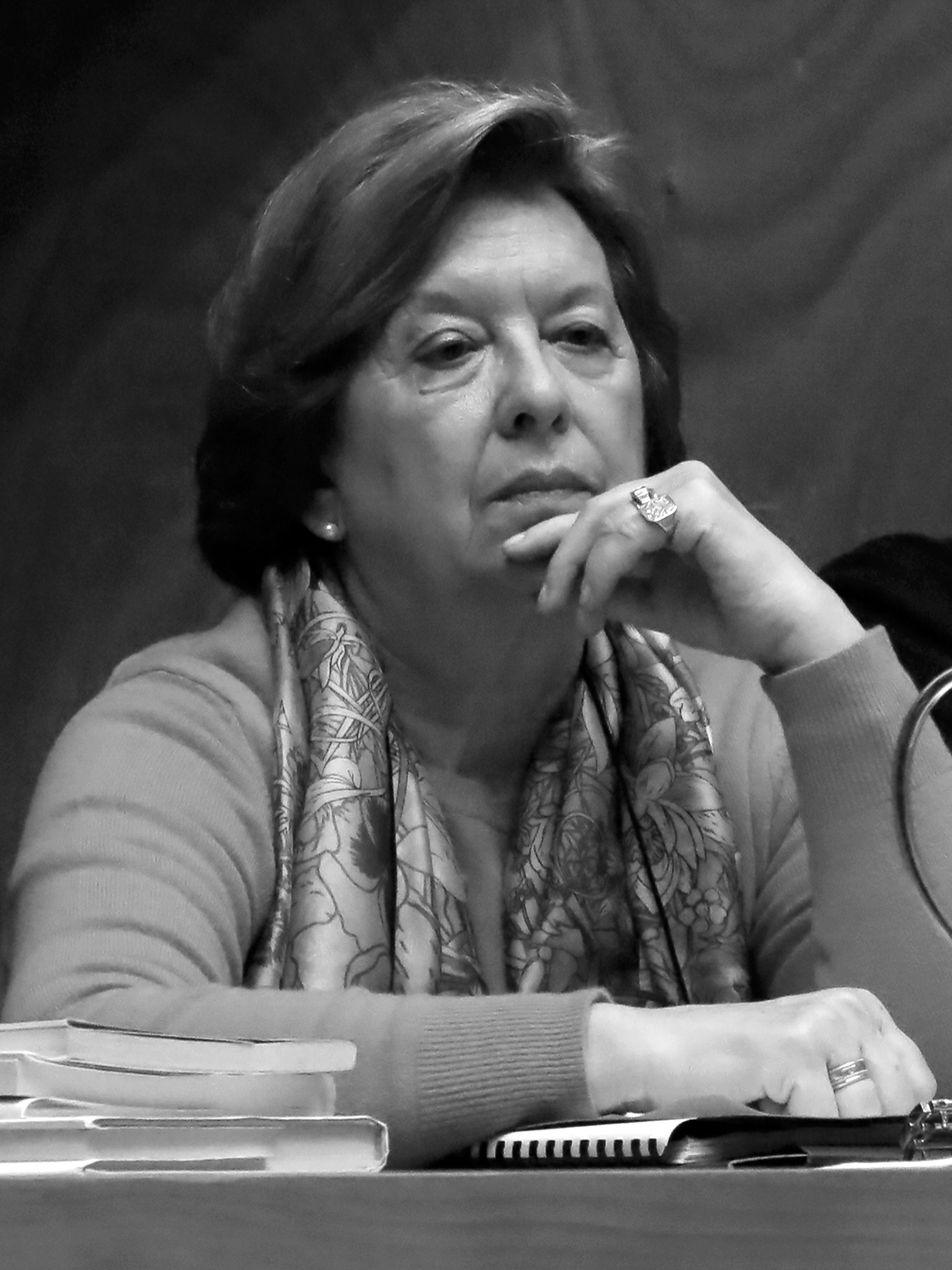
- Born: April 5, 1947 (age 79); Madruzzo, Trentino, Italy
- Occupations: writer; essayist; literary critic; novelist; researcher
- Writing career
- Language: Italian
- Genres: non-fiction; essays; literary criticism; novels

Saveria Chemotti (born April 5, 1947) is an Italian writer of non-fiction and prose. She is an essayist, novelist, and literary critic, as well as a researcher with a focus area of culture and gender studies.

== Biography ==
Saveria Chemotti was born Madruzzo, Trentino, April 5, 1947. She earned a degree in literary subjects in 1972 (with a thesis on Antonio Gramsci as a critic of literature).

In 1981, she became a university researcher. Since 2003, she has been the rector's delegate for culture and gender studies and has organized the "Forum interdisciplinare per gli studi e la formazione di genere" (English interdisciplinary forum for gender studies and training) at the University of Padua.

Chemotti directed the series of gender studies, Soggetti rivelati. Ritratti, storie, scritture di donne (English: Revealed subjects. Portraits, stories, writings of women) (ed. Il Poligrafo) and Graphie (ed. Il Poligrafo), the narrative series Vicoli. Vie strette secondarie. Paesaggi letterari inesplorati (English: Vicoli. Narrow secondary streets. Unexplored literary landscapes) (ed. CLEUP), Destini incrociati (English: Crossed destinies( (ed. Il Poligrafo, 2021), and co-edited the six-monthly review of the history of contemporary Italian literature Studi novecenteschi (English: Twentieth Century Studies) (Pisa, Fabrizio Serra Editore).

She deals with Italian and European romanticism, the fiction of the second half of the nineteenth and early twentieth centuries, culture and gender, as well as women's literature and authors, such as Ugo Foscolo, Antonio Gramsci, Tonino Guerra, and Giuseppe Berto.

Chemotti contributed to the reprint of the magazine, Argomenti (Arnaldo Forni Editore) and in 2011, she collaborated with the journalist Paolo Coltro on his collection of articles.

She edited the posthumous publication of some works by Antonietta Giacomelli (such as Vigilie and Sulla breccia) and Romano Pascutto (such as Il praetore delle baracche, La lodola morning, and Il viaggio). In 2013, Chemotti coordinated the cycle of lessons entitled, La Schola del Bo. La ricerca e l’esperienza culturale a disposizione della città (English: The Schola del Bo. Research and cultural experience available to the city) at the University of Padua.

Her work, La passione di una figlia ingrata (English: The Passion of an Ungrateful Daughter) (2014) was a finalist in the Narrative section of the Giovanni Comisso Literary Prize, 2015.

== Selected works ==
=== Essays ===
- A piè di pagina. Saggi di letteratura italiana, Padova, ed. Il Poligrafo, 2012, ISBN 9788871157726.
- Lo specchio infranto: la relazione tra padre e figlia in alcune scrittrici italiane contemporanee in collaboration with Regione del Veneto, Padova, ed. Il Poligrafo, 2010, ISBN 9788871156811.
- L'inchiostro bianco: madri e figlie nella narrativa italiana contemporanea, Padova, ed. Il Poligrafo, 2009, ISBN 9788871156200.
- La terra in tasca: esperienze di scrittura nel Veneto contemporaneo, ed. Il Poligrafo, 2003, ISBN 9788871153483.
- Il "limes" e la casa degli specchi. La nuova narrativa veneta, ed. University of Michigan, Padova, ed. Il Poligrafo, 1999, ISBN 9788871152066.
- Il mito americano: origine e crisi di un modello culturale, Padova, ed. CLEUP, 1980, ISBN 9788871788234.
- Gli intellettuali in trincea: politica e cultura nell'Italia del dopoguerra, introduction by Gian Piero Brunetta, Padova, ed. CLEUP, 1977, BN 778486.
- Umanesimo, rinascimento, Machiavelli nella critica gramsciana, Roma, ed. Bulzoni Editore, 1975, BN 764120.

=== Novels ===
- Ti ho cercata in ogni stanza, ed. L'Iguana, 2016, ISBN 9788898174201.
- La passione di una figlia ingrata, ed. L'Iguana, 2014, ISBN 9788898174089.
- Siamo tutte ragazze madri, ed. L'Iguana, 2018, ISBN 978-88-98174-28-7.
- A che punto è il giorno. Racconti, ed. Apogeo, 2019, ISBN 978-88-99479-43-5.
- Quella voce poco fa, ed. Jacobelli, 2019, ISBN 9788862524698.

=== Stories ===
- M'ama? Mamme, madri, matrigne oppure no, edited by Annalisa Bruni, Saveria Chemotti and Antonella Cilento, Padova, ed. Il Poligrafo, 2008, ISBN 9788871155906.
- Il giogo dei ruoli (with Mario Coglitore), Il poligrafo, 2021.
