= Aviolo Lake =

Lake in Lombardy, Italy

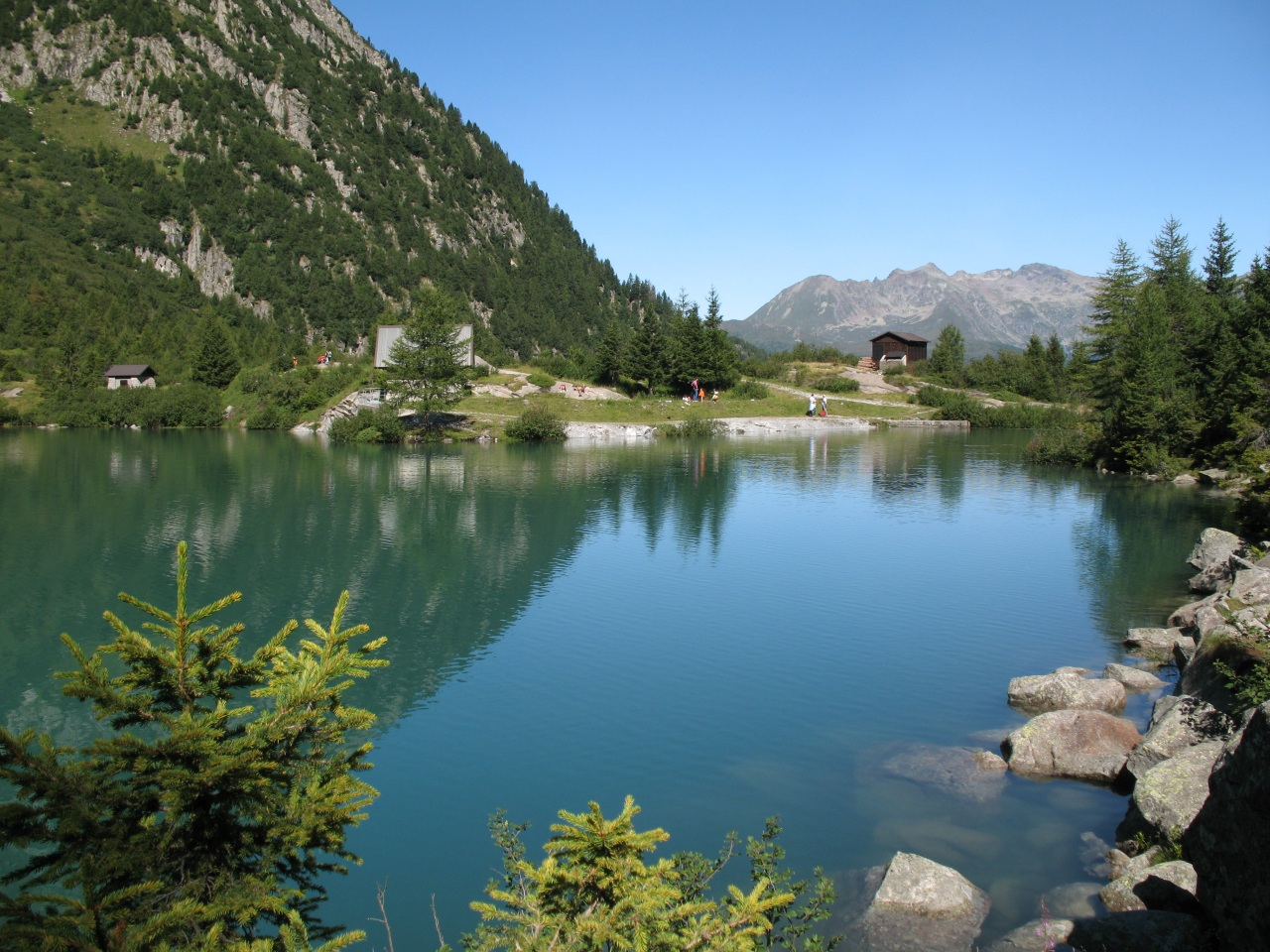

- Location within Italy
- Location: Province of Brescia, Lombardy
- Coordinates: 46°11′40″N 10°24′48″E
- Primary inflows: Torrente Aviolo
- Primary outflows: Torrente Aviolo
- Basin countries: Italy
- Surface area: 6.65 ha (16.4 acres)
- Surface elevation: 1,930 m (6,330 ft)

Aviolo Lake is a lake in the Province of Brescia, Lombardy, Italy. At an elevation of 1930 m, its surface area is 6.65 ha (16.4 acres).

The lake is a popular hiking and climbing destination. The Club Alpino Italiano maintains a mountain refuge hut at the lake, the Rifugio Sandro Occhi all'Aviolo.

In 2022, 40 marmots were released at the lake in a relocation effort after their numbers grew too numerous in Livigno.

Vintners have used the lake's high altitude and cool temperatures to age wines underwater.
