= Lasino =

- Comune
- Comune di Lasino
- Location within Italy Location within Trentino-Alto Adige/Südtirol
- Coordinates: 46°1′N 10°59′E
- Country: Italy
- Region: Trentino-Alto Adige/Südtirol
- Province: Trentino (TN)

Area
  - Total: 16.0 km^{2} (6.2 sq mi)

Population (Dec. 2007)
  - Total: 1,298
  - Density: 81.1/km^{2} (210/sq mi)
- Time zone: UTC+1 (CET)
  - Summer (DST): UTC+2 (CEST)
- Postal code: 38076
- Dialing code: 0461
- Website: Official website

Lasino (Lasin in local dialect) was a comune (municipality) in Trentino in the northern Italian region Trentino-Alto Adige/Südtirol, located about 12 kilometres (7 mi) southwest of Trento. As of 31 December 2007, it had a population of 1,298 and an area of 16.0 square kilometres (6.2 mi^{2}). It was merged with Calavino to form a new municipality, Madruzzo.

Lasino borders the following municipalities: Trento, Calavino, Dro and Cavedine.

== Demographic evolution ==
Historical population

Year	Pop.	±%
1861	?	—
1871	?	—
1881	?	—
1901	?	—
1911	?	—

Year	Pop.	±%
1921	1,299	—
1931	1,030	−20.7%
1936	979	−5.0%
1951	1,089	+11.2%
1961	995	−8.6%

Year	Pop.	±%
1971	949	−4.6%
1981	894	−5.8%
1991	1,028	+15.0%
2001	1,178	+14.6%

Source: Data from ISTAT
