= Lavis =

- Comune
- Comune di Lavis
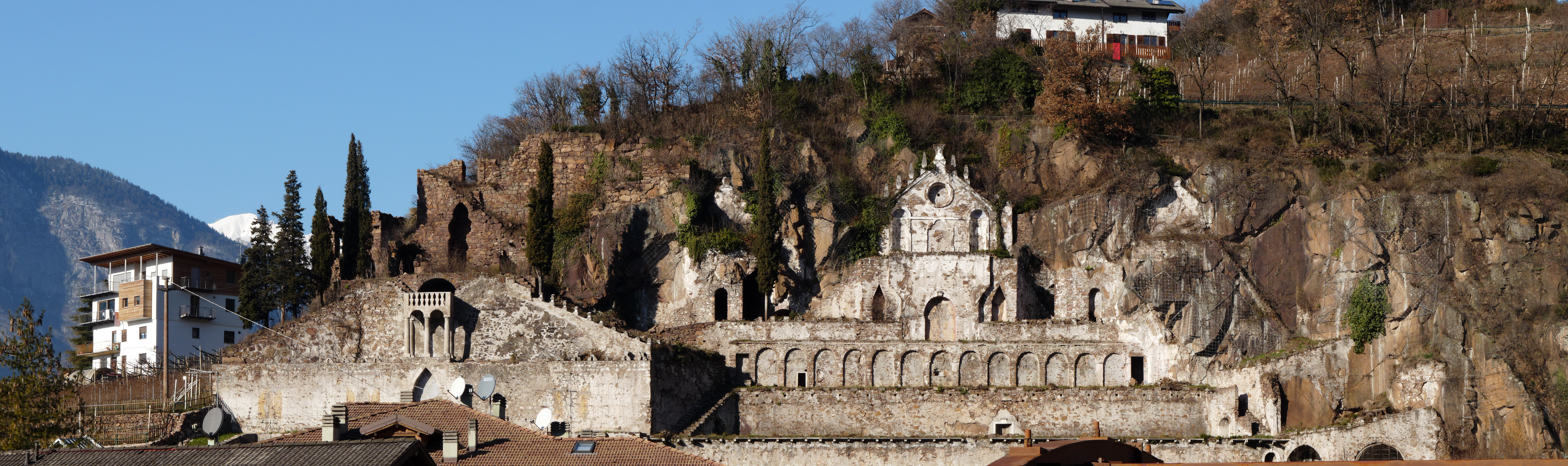
- Ciucioi garden

- Location within Italy Location within Trentino-Alto Adige/Südtirol
- Coordinates: 46°8′N 11°7′E
- Country: Italy
- Region: Trentino-Alto Adige/Südtirol
- Province: Trentino (TN)
- Frazioni: Pressano, Sorni, Nave San Felice

Government
  - Mayor: Luca Paolazzi

Area
  - Total: 12.4 km^{2} (4.8 sq mi)
- Elevation: 235 m (771 ft)

Population (2026)
  - Total: 9,208
  - Density: 743/km^{2} (1,920/sq mi)
- Demonym: Lavisani
- Time zone: UTC+1 (CET)
  - Summer (DST): UTC+2 (CEST)
- Postal code: 38015
- Dialing code: 0461
- Website: Official website

Lavis (Lavìs in local dialect) is a comune (municipality) in Trentino in the northern Italian region Trentino-Alto Adige/Südtirol, located about 9 kilometres (6 miles) north of Trento. As of 31 December 2006, it had a population of 9.000 and an area of 12.4 square kilometres (4.8 sq mi).

The municipality of Lavis contains the frazioni (subdivisions, mainly villages and hamlets) Pressano, Sorni and Nave San Felice. Lavis borders the following municipalities: Giovo, San Michele all'Adige, Nave San Rocco, Zambana, Trento and Terlago.

== Twin towns – sister cities ==
Lavis is twinned with:

- Forchheim, Germany

== Demographic evolution ==
Historical population

Year	Pop.	±%
1861	?	—
1871	?	—
1881	?	—
1901	?	—
1911	?	—

Year	Pop.	±%
1921	3,711	—
1931	3,767	+1.5%
1936	3,695	−1.9%
1951	4,206	+13.8%
1961	4,477	+6.4%

Year	Pop.	±%
1971	5,390	+20.4%
1981	6,309	+17.1%
1991	6,657	+5.5%
2001	7,591	+14.0%

Source: Data from ISTAT
