= Calavino =

- Comune
- Comune di Calavino
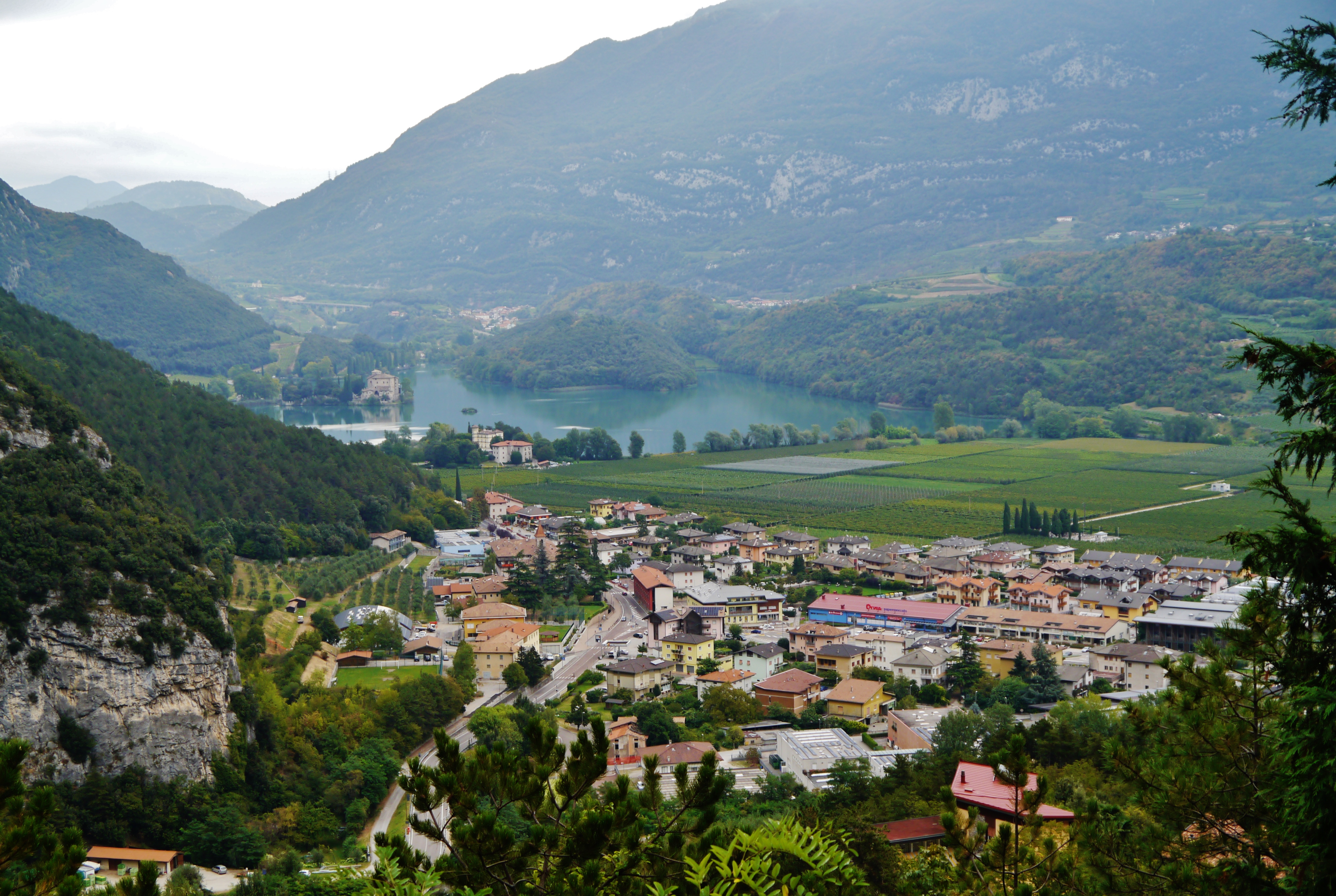

- Location within Italy Location within Trentino-Alto Adige/Südtirol
- Coordinates: 46°3′N 10°59′E
- Country: Italy
- Region: Trentino-Alto Adige/Südtirol
- Province: Trentino (TN)

Area
  - Total: 12.8 km^{2} (4.9 sq mi)

Population (Dec. 2004)
  - Total: 1,365
  - Density: 107/km^{2} (276/sq mi)
- Time zone: UTC+1 (CET)
  - Summer (DST): UTC+2 (CEST)
- Postal code: 38072
- Dialing code: 0461
- Website: Official website

Calavino (Calavin in local dialect) was a comune (municipality) in Trentino in the northern Italian region Trentino-Alto Adige/Südtirol, located about 18 kilometres (11 mi) west of Trento. As of 31 December 2004, it had a population of 1,365 and an area of 12.8 square kilometres (4.9 mi^{2}). It was merged with Lasino to form a new municipality, Madruzzo.

Calavino borders the following municipalities: San Lorenzo in Banale, Trento, Vezzano, Padergnone, Lomaso, Lasino and Dro.

== Demographic evolution ==
Historical population

Year	Pop.	±%
1861	?	—
1871	?	—
1881	?	—
1901	?	—
1911	?	—

Year	Pop.	±%
1921	1,425	—
1931	1,351	−5.2%
1936	1,302	−3.6%
1951	1,236	−5.1%
1961	1,176	−4.9%

Year	Pop.	±%
1971	1,090	−7.3%
1981	1,085	−0.5%
1991	1,177	+8.5%
2001	1,226	+4.2%

Source: Data from ISTAT
