= San Michele all'Adige =

- Comune
- Comune di San Michele all'Adige
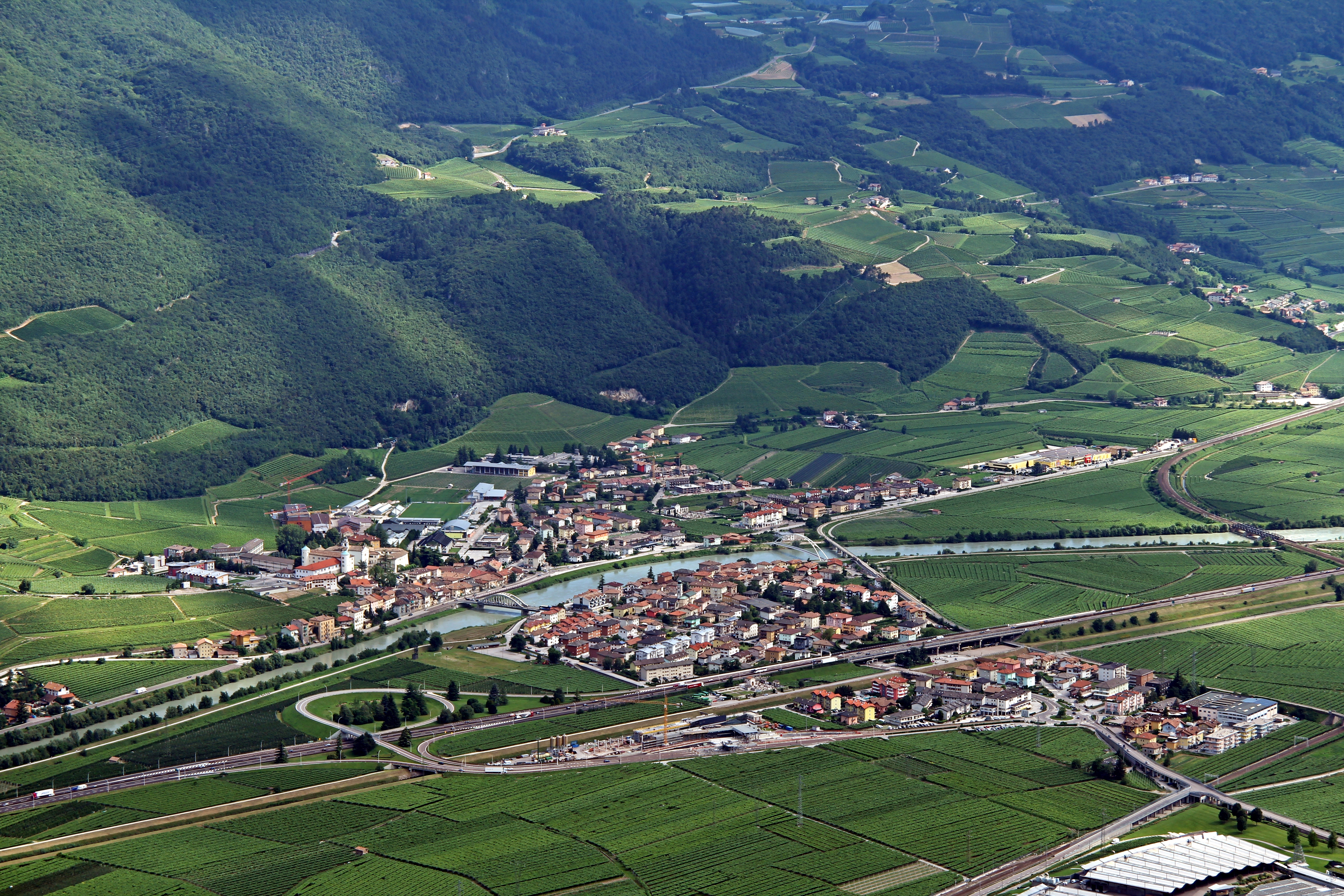

- Coat of arms

- Location within Italy Location within Trentino-Alto Adige/Südtirol
- Coordinates: 46°12′N 11°8′E
- Country: Italy
- Region: Trentino-Alto Adige/Südtirol
- Province: Trentino (TN)
- Frazioni: Grumo

Government
  - Mayor: Alessandro Ziglio

Area
  - Total: 5.3 km^{2} (2.0 sq mi)
- Elevation: 228 m (748 ft)

Population (30 June 2014)
  - Total: 3,064
  - Density: 580/km^{2} (1,500/sq mi)
- Demonym: Sammichelotti
- Time zone: UTC+1 (CET)
  - Summer (DST): UTC+2 (CEST)
- Postal code: 38010
- Dialing code: 0461
- Website: Official website

San Michele all'Adige (Trentino dialect: Samichél) is a comune (municipality) in Trentino in the northern Italian region Trentino-Alto Adige/Südtirol, located about 15 kilometres (9 mi) north of Trento.

== Geography ==
The municipality borders the nearby municipalities of Giovo, Lavis, Mezzocorona, Mezzolombardo, and Nave San Rocco. It includes the two frazioni (civil parishes) of Grumo and Faedo, and is situated on both sides of the Adige.

== Transportation ==
Transportation links include the railway line from Verona to Innsbruck 1 kilometre (1 mi) away at nearby Mezzocorona and the Autostrada #22 controlled access highway, with a tollbooth located in Grumo.

San Michele sits at the intersection of State Highway #22 and State Highway #43. A canal ("fossa") originating in Kaltern/Caldaro passes along the A22 and empties into the Adige River just south of the town.

== History ==
San Michele lies along the Via Claudia Augusta, the historic Roman road connecting Italy to Germany, and is one of the principal areas for the production of Teroldego grapes under the Italian DOC standard.

The Church and Monastery of San Michele the Archangel dates to 1144, while the Monreale Castle just north of San Michele dates to at least 1238.

== See also ==
- Istituto Agrario di San Michele all’Adige
