= Mezzocorona =

- Comune
- Comune di Mezzocorona
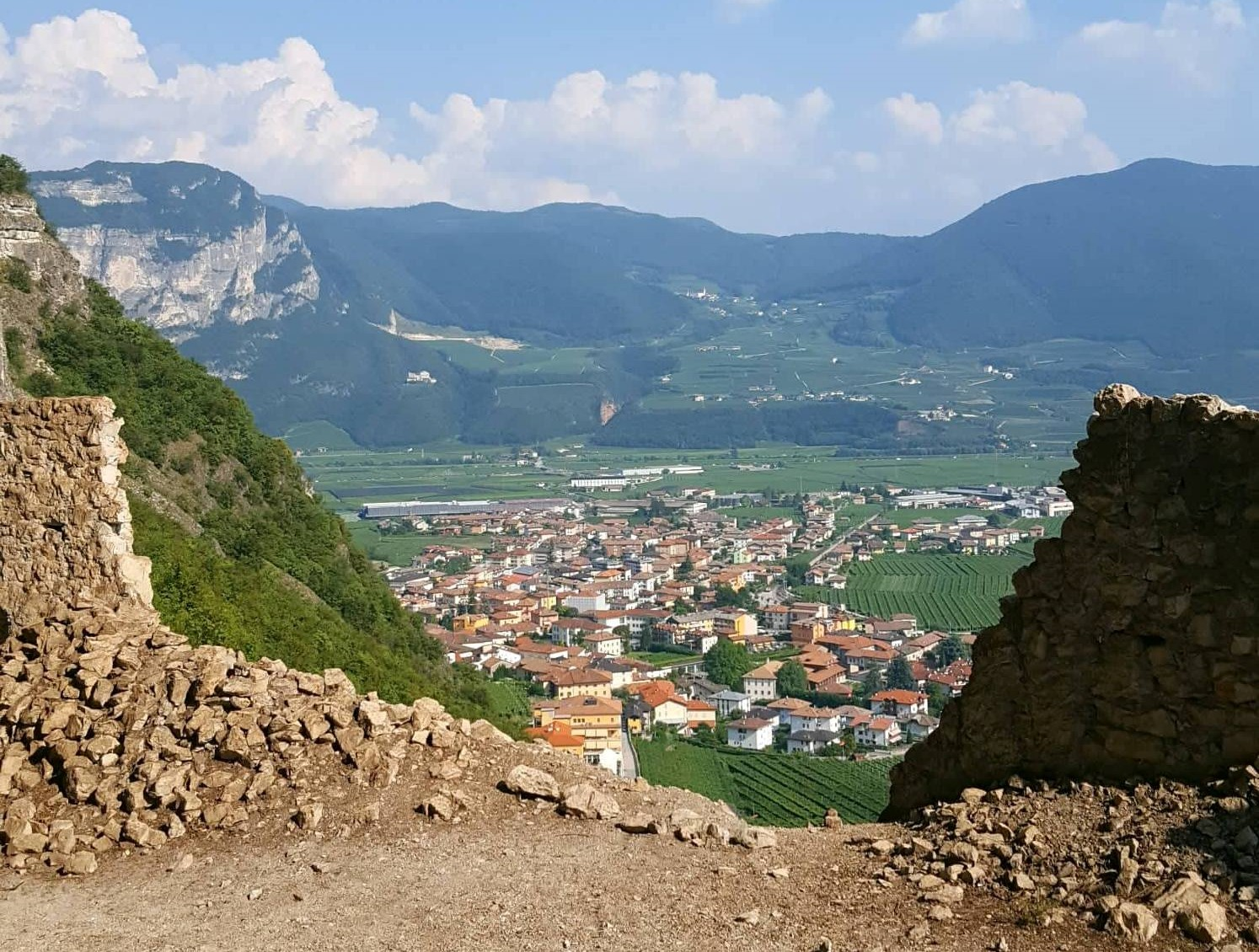
- Mezzocorona from Castel San Gottardo

- Coat of arms

- Location within Italy Location within Trentino-Alto Adige/Südtirol
- Coordinates: 46°13′N 11°7′E
- Country: Italy
- Region: Trentino-Alto Adige/Südtirol
- Province: Trentino (TN)

Government
  - Mayor: Mattia Hauser

Area
  - Total: 25 km^{2} (9.7 sq mi)
- Elevation: 219 m (719 ft)

Population (2026)
  - Total: 5,462
  - Density: 220/km^{2} (570/sq mi)
- Demonym(s): Mezzocoronesi, Brusacristi
- Time zone: UTC+1 (CET)
  - Summer (DST): UTC+2 (CEST)
- Postal code: 38016
- Dialing code: 0461
- Patron saint: Saint Gothard
- Website: Official website

Mezzocorona (Italian pronunciation: [ˌmɛddzokoˈroːna]; Mezacoróna in local dialect, Kronmétz or Deutschmétz in german language), is a comune (municipality) in Trentino in the northern Italian region Trentino-Alto Adige/Südtirol, located about 15 kilometres (9 mi) north of the city of Trento and within 5 kilometres (3.1 mi) of the Südtirol border.

== Toponymy ==
The name is thought to derive from the Italian words mezzo, meaning "middle" or "in-between", and corona, which means "crown" (and is likely a reference to the shape of nearby Castel San Gottardo). Another possible origin is to be found in the dialect of the area: mez (with the variant miz) which means "wet, soggy". In fact, Mezzocorona was a marshy area until the 19th century, when swamplands were eventually reclaimed and Noce's outlet into Adige River moved further downstream, near Zambana.

In 1194 the Counts of Tyrol took control of the area. After this event (the population of the town became predominantly German speaking till the 16th century) the toponym Mezzotedesco (German: Deutschmetz) (= "German Metz") came into use, in opposition to her twin town Mezzolombardo in German called Welsch Metz. Welsch in German stands for speakers of a Latin language.

On 29 February 1902 the Viennese Ministry of the Interior allowed the name change from Mezzotedesco to Mezocorona, in the corresponding German form of "Kronmetz". The current name dates back to 1924.

The inhabitants are called Mezzocoronesi or rarely Brusacristi. Behind the latter demonym there is a bizarre story: its inhabitants were nicknamed Brusacristi (literally "Christburners") for burning a cross placed by the inhabitants of Mezzolombardo to mark the banks of the Noce River.

== Geography ==
Mezzocorona is located in the Rotaliana Plain, an alluvial plain situated at the confluence of the Non Valley with the Etschtal. The village lies at the foot of a steep rocky mountain wall (Monte di Mezzocorona) that shields it from the cold northern winds. This particular conformation has resulted in a milder climate than that of the surrounding areas, allowing the vine to grow plentifully in this region. Its territory is crossed by two water streams, the Adige River and the Noce River.

The Teroldego grape variety is native to this area.

Mezzocorona borders the following municipalities: Mezzolombardo, Ton, Roverè della Luna, San Michele all'Adige and Nave San Rocco.

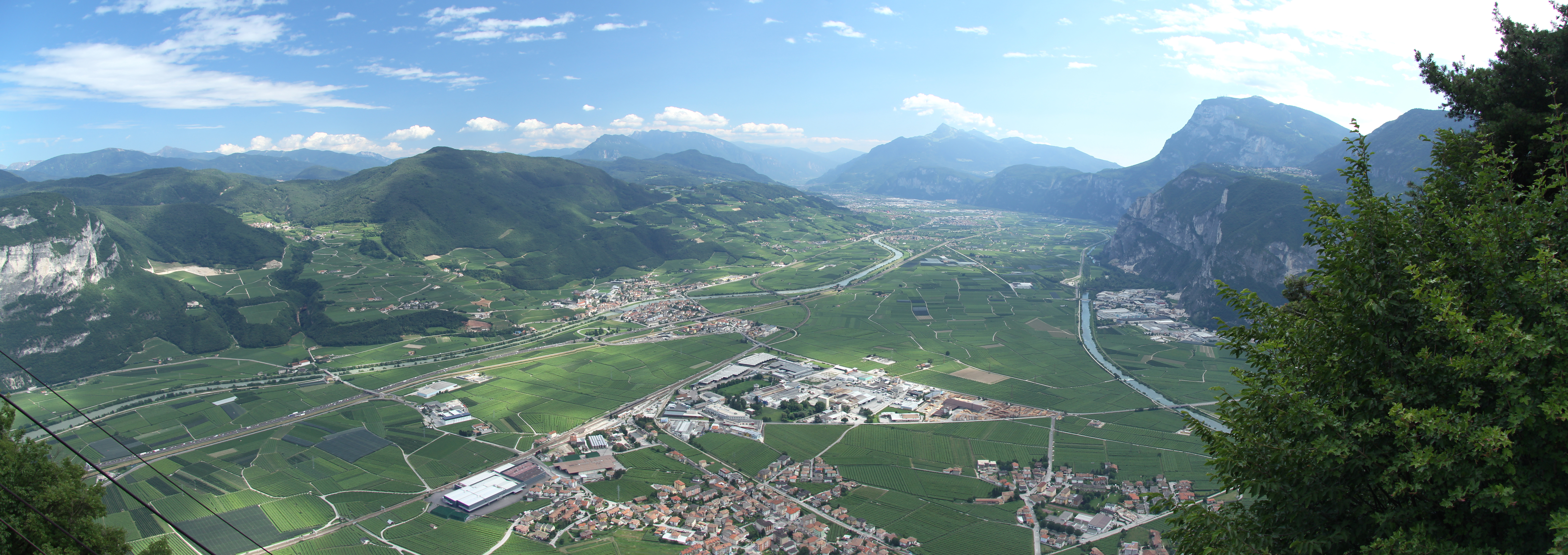
The Piana Rotaliana as seen from Monte di Mezzocorona. Left: Adige River. Bottom: village of Mezzocorona. Right: Noce River

== History ==
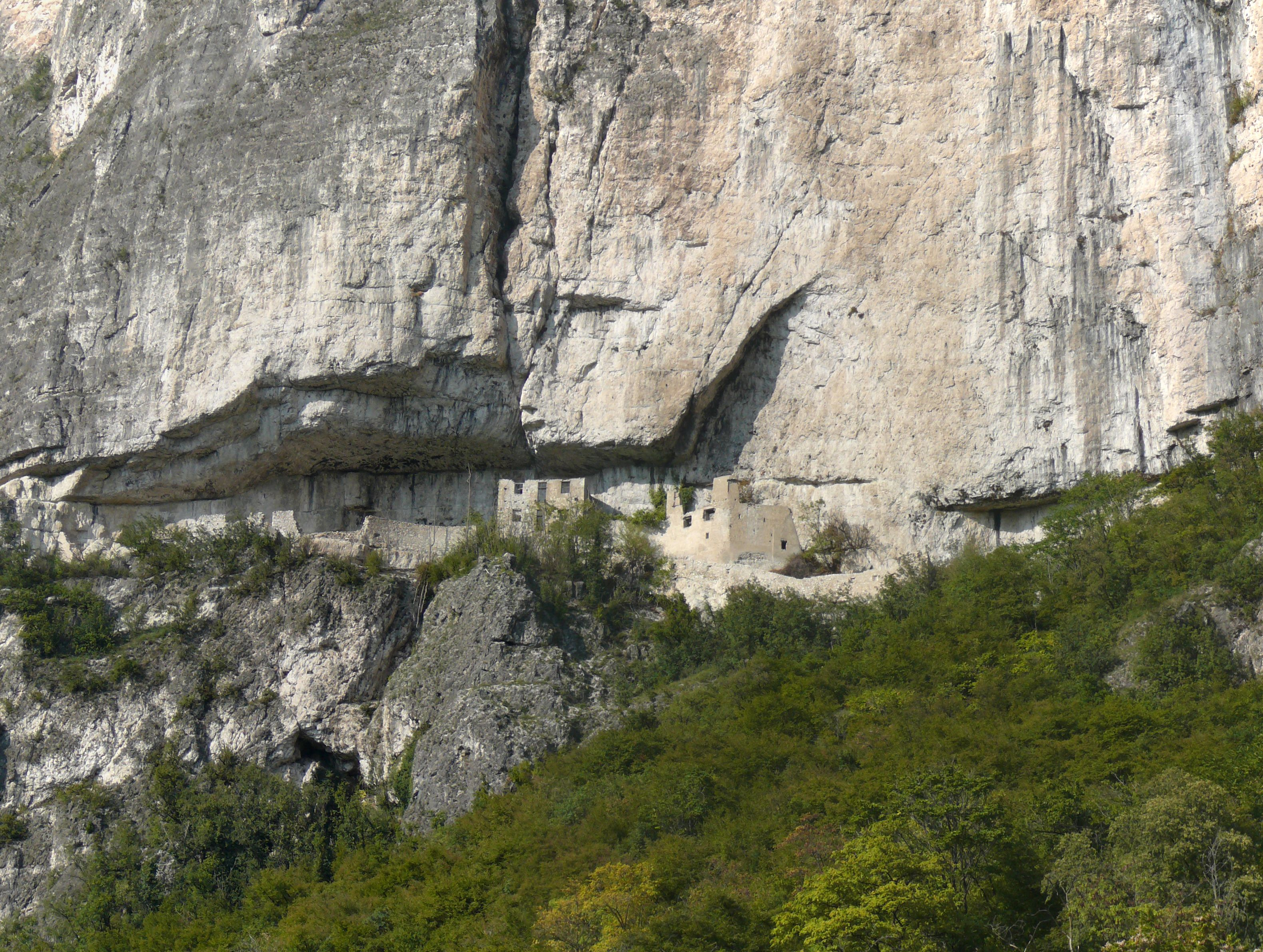
The ruins of Castel San Gottardo

The Rotaliana plain has been continually inhabited since prehistorical times with documented evidence, such as the remains of an ancient woman dating back to the Mesolithic period. This finding sparked interest among the citizens, who refer to this skeleton as Nonna di Mezzocorona (= "Grandma of Mezzocorona").

Thanks to the Adige River and the Claudia Augusta Imperial Road, the area of Mezzocorona has served as a strategic road junction between the valleys of the Adige, Noce and Avisio Rivers ever since the times of the Romans. But the first written evidence goes back to 1199 and refers to the church, the venue of the ancient Parish of Santa Maria, which also comprised some nearby villages.

Similarly to other realities in Trentino, Mezzocorona was also ruled by an agrarian community called Vicinia of Mezzocorona (Comunitas Meçi de Corona), which was first mentioned during the investiture of the Bishop of Trento, Egnone, dating back to 1271. The Mezzocorona Vicinia extended as far as Roverè della Luna and Grumo and consisted of many fuochi (entitled families) or masi (farmsteads): 50 in Mezzocorona, 18 in Roverè della Luna and 10 in Grumo. Everyday life was regulated by a set of rules called Carta di Regola or Vicinia Statute by which everyone had to abide. The seat of the community was the Palazzo della Vicinia, today the public library.

In the first half of the 14th century, following the expansion policy of the Counts of Tyrol, the jurisdiction passed to their domain and the Tyrol Statute was implemented along with the Vicinia Statute. This represented the basic laws in force until the early 19th century.

Historical noble families of Mezzocorona were the Mez family and after them, the Firmian family. The Mez dynasty built their first manor in a crack of the mountain above the village, making it hard to be conquered. This castle, now known as Castel San Gottardo, was later abandoned for a more comfortable dwelling at the foot of the mountain under the Firmian family.

== Society ==
As of 31 December 2017, Mezzocorona had a population of 5477.

=== Demographic evolution ===
Historical population

Year	Pop.	±%
1911	?	—
1921	3,142	—
1931	3,263	+3.9%
1936	3,312	+1.5%

Year	Pop.	±%
1951	3,551	+7.2%
1961	3,639	+2.5%
1971	4,091	+12.4%
1981	4,366	+6.7%

Year	Pop.	±%
1991	4,345	−0.5%
2001	4,711	+8.4%
2011	5,161	+9.6%

Source: Data from ISTAT & ASTAT

== Transport ==
=== Motorway ===
Mezzocorona is connected to the motorway network A22-E45.

=== Rail ===
Mezzocorona has three railway stations:

- One railway station connected to the Brenner Railway
- Two railway stations (Mezzocorona Ferrovia and Mezzocorona Borgata) connected to the Trento–Malè–Mezzana railway

=== Cable car ===
The village is also served by a cablecar that connects the village to the top of the Monte di Mezzocorona. From here, Malga Kraun can be reached in an hour's walk on the marked forest path n°500.

== Notable people ==
- Marvin Vettori, professional mixed martial artist

== Gallery ==
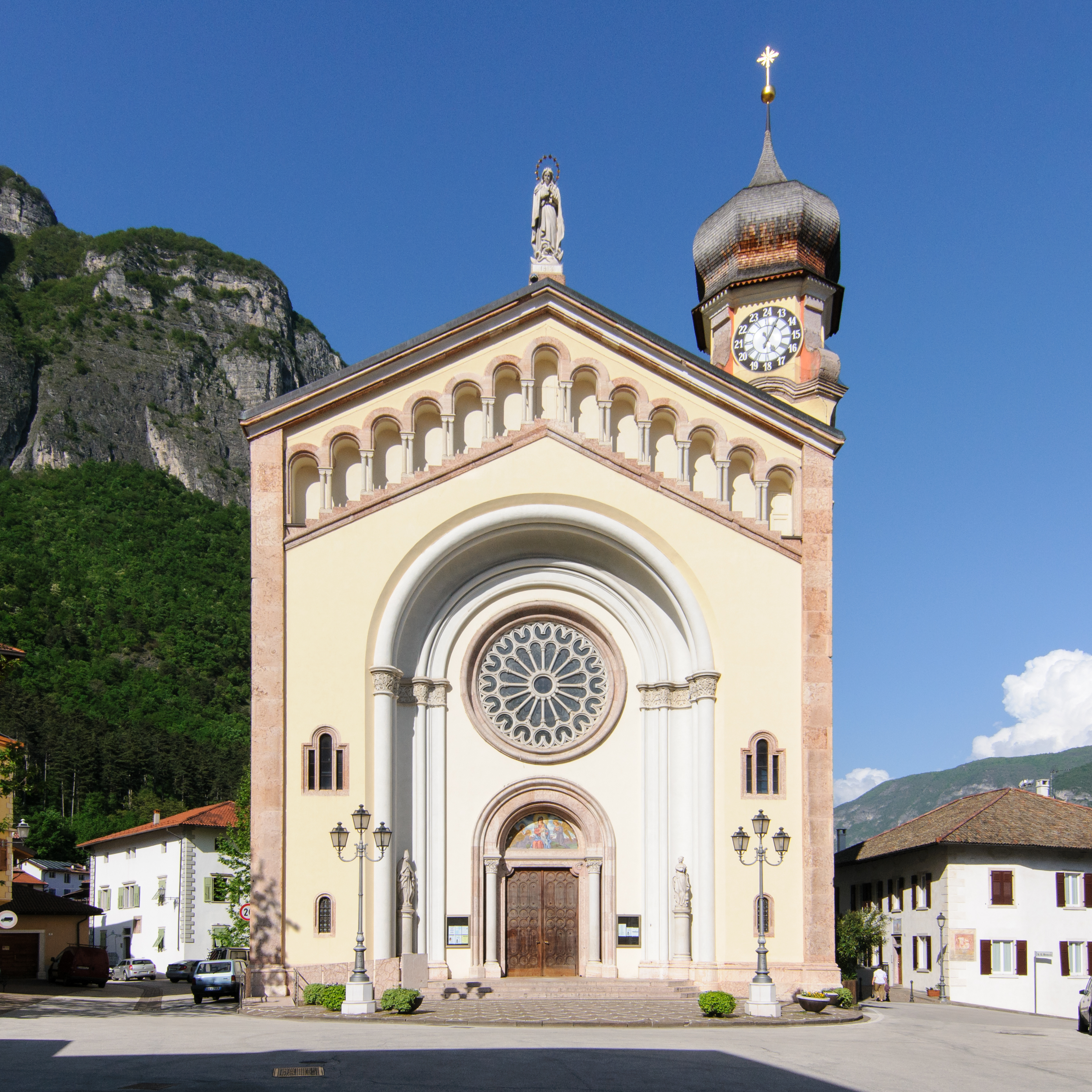
St Mary Church

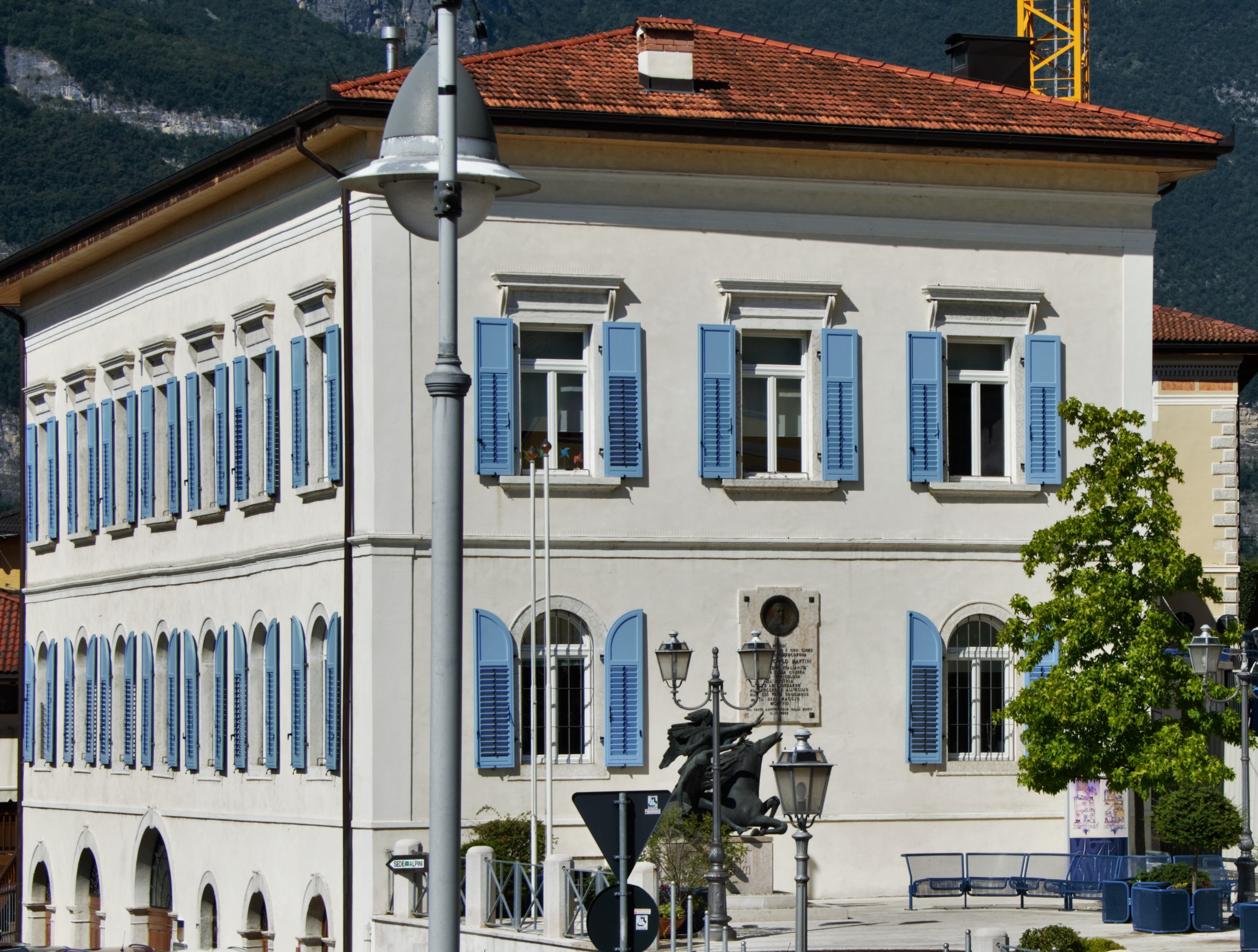
Palazzo della Vicinia, now the public library

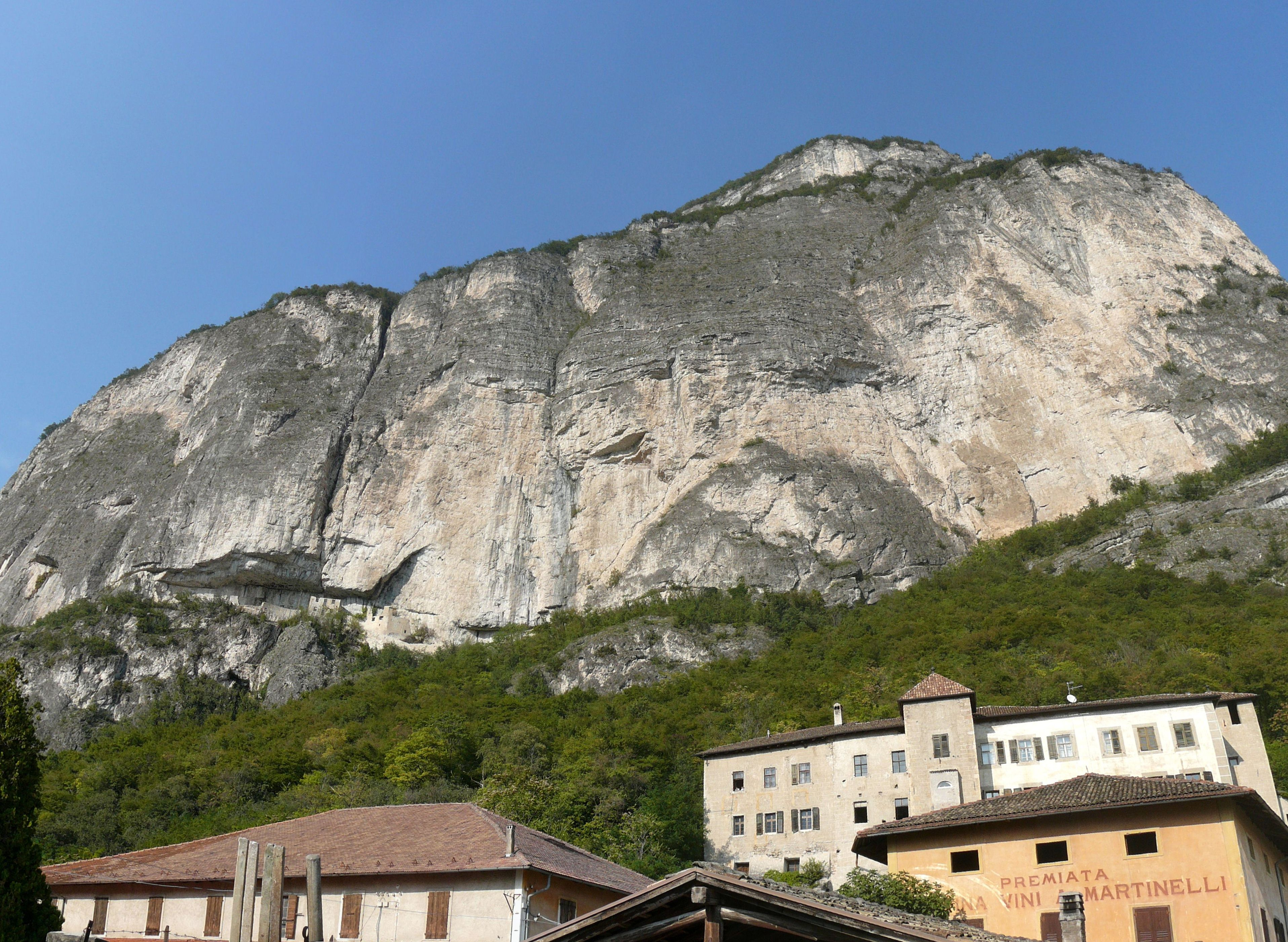
Castel Firmian (bottom) and Castel Gottardo (top)

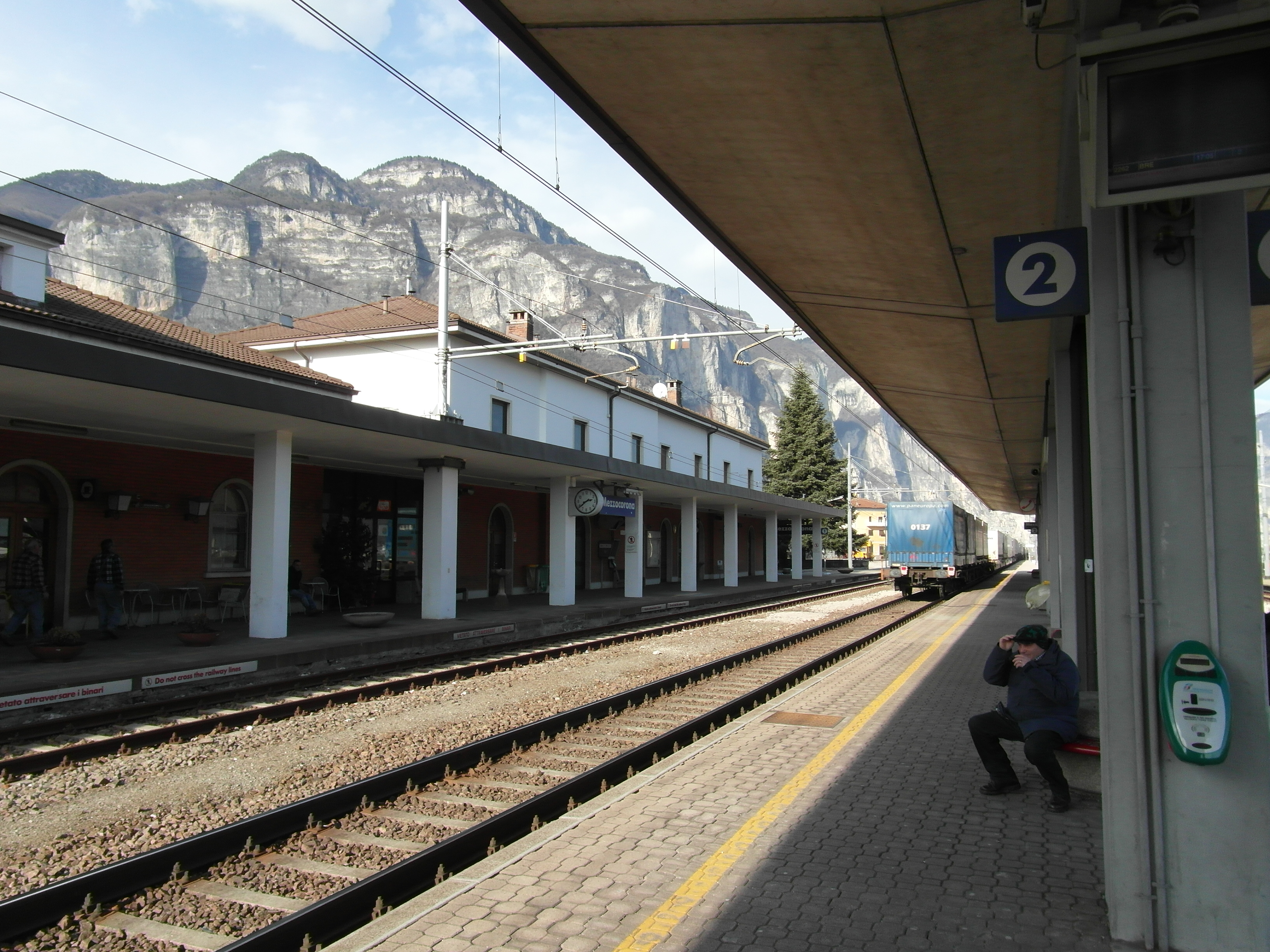
Mezzocorona Railway station

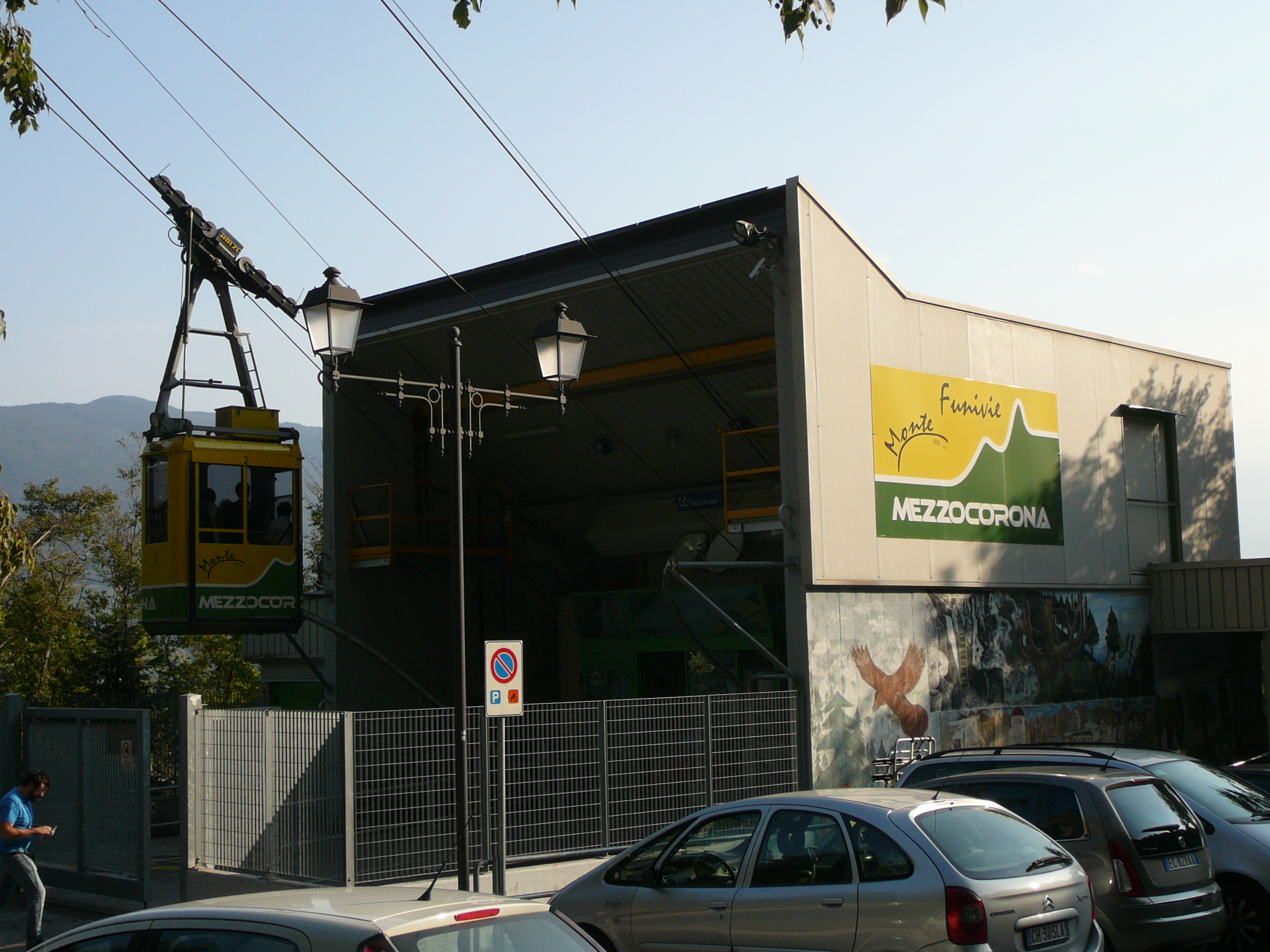
Cableway lower station

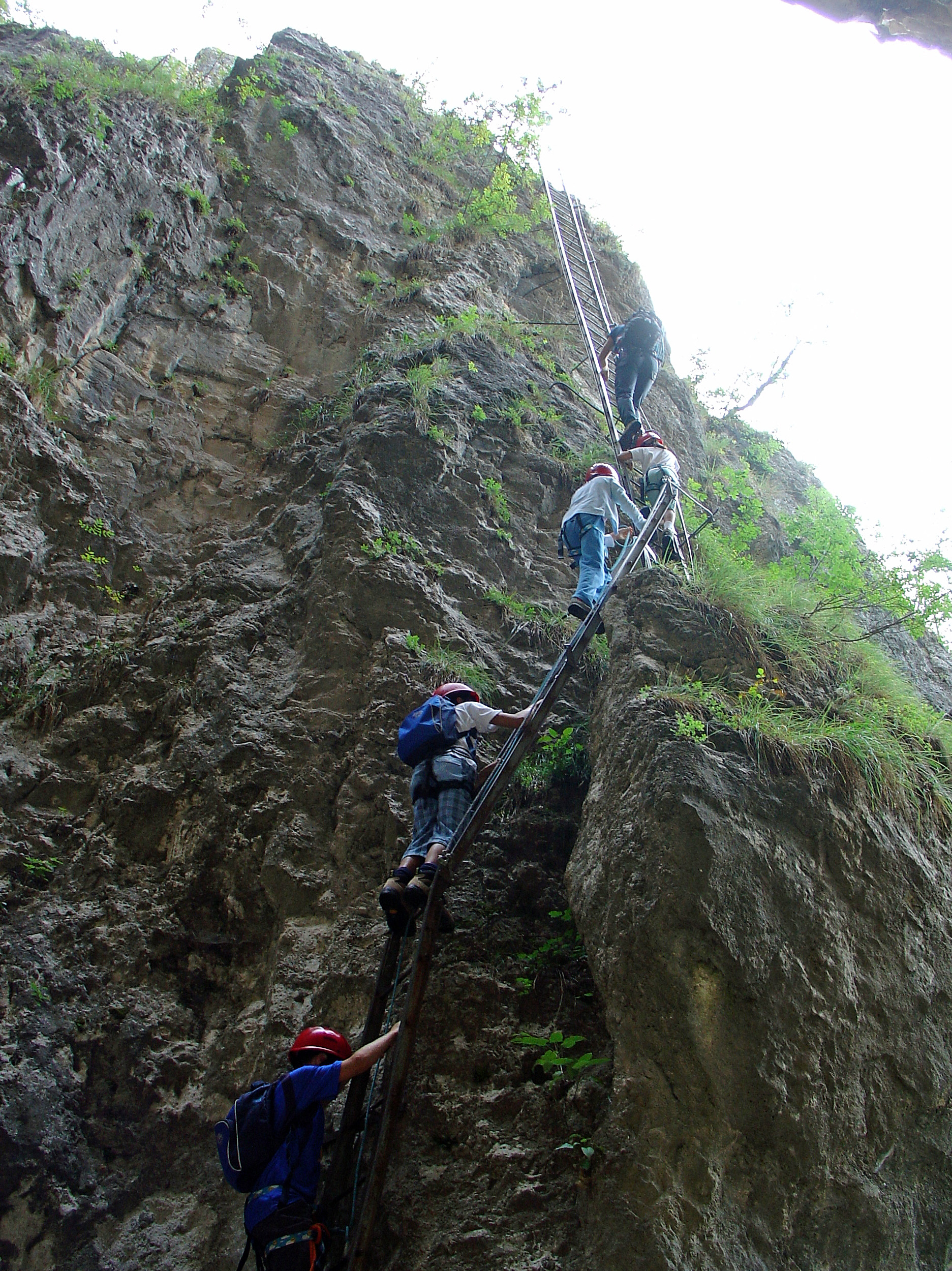
Via Ferrata Burrone Giovanelli

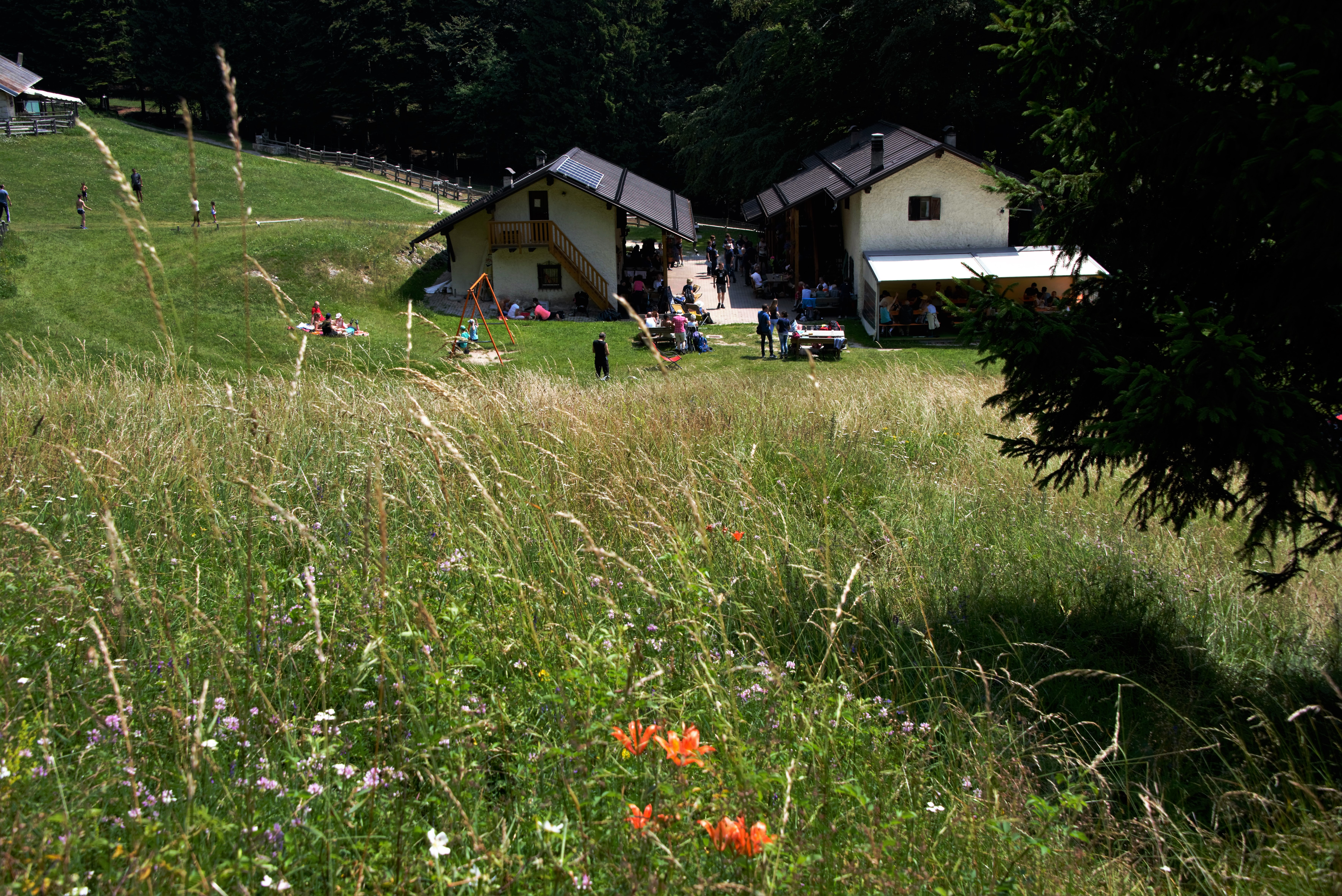
Malga Kraun
