= Terlago =

- Comune
- Comune di Terlago
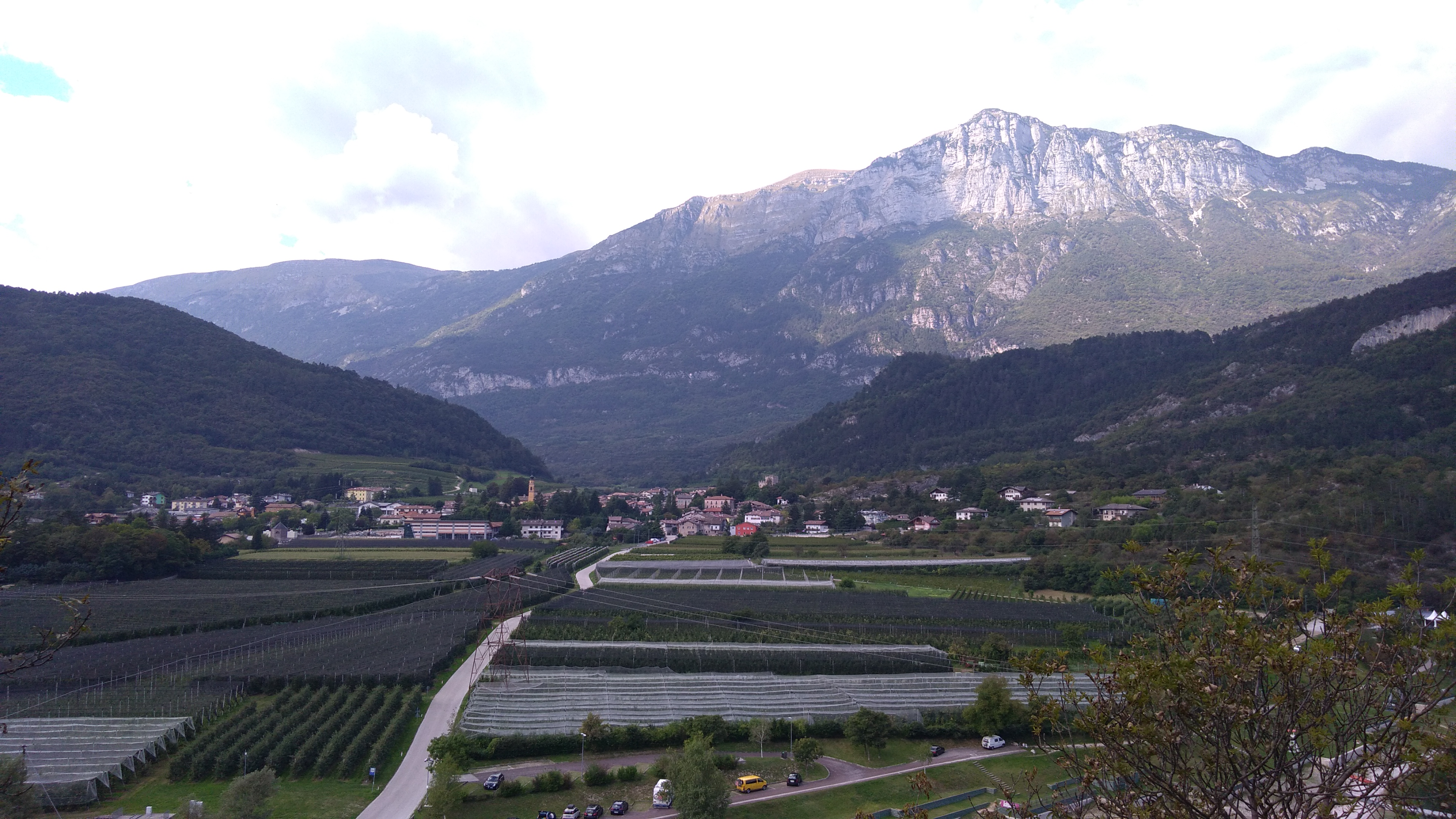
- Panorama of Terlago (Comune di Vallelaghi, Trento, Italy)

- Location within Italy Location within Trentino-Alto Adige/Südtirol
- Coordinates: 46°6′N 11°3′E
- Country: Italy
- Region: Trentino-Alto Adige/Südtirol
- Province: Trentino (TN)

Area
  - Total: 37.0 km^{2} (14.3 sq mi)

Population (Dec. 2004)
  - Total: 1,571
  - Density: 42.5/km^{2} (110/sq mi)
- Time zone: UTC+1 (CET)
  - Summer (DST): UTC+2 (CEST)
- Postal code: 38070
- Dialing code: 0461
- Website: Official website

Terlago (Terlác in local dialect) was a comune (municipality) in Trentino in the northern Italian region Trentino-Alto Adige/Südtirol, located about 6 kilometres (4 mi) northwest of Trento. As of 31 December 2004, it had a population of 1,571 and an area of 37.0 square kilometres (14.3 mi^{2}). It was merged with Padergnone and Vezzano on January 1, 2016, to form a new municipality, Vallelaghi.

Terlago borders the following municipalities: Fai della Paganella, Molveno, Lavis, Zambana, Andalo, Trento and Vezzano.

Terlago's name derives from the Latin trilacum -- "the three lakes"—which refers to nearby Lake Lamar, Lake Terlago, and Lago Santo.

== Demographic evolution ==
Historical population

| Year | Pop. | ±% |
|---|---|---|
| 1861 | ? | — |
| 1871 | ? | — |
| 1881 | ? | — |
| 1901 | ? | — |
| 1911 | ? | — |

| Year | Pop. | ±% |
|---|---|---|
| 1921 | 1,484 | — |
| 1931 | 1,288 | −13.2% |
| 1936 | 1,201 | −6.8% |
| 1951 | 1,269 | +5.7% |
| 1961 | 1,242 | −2.1% |

| Year | Pop. | ±% |
|---|---|---|
| 1971 | 1,270 | +2.3% |
| 1981 | 1,308 | +3.0% |
| 1991 | 1,352 | +3.4% |
| 2001 | 1,455 | +7.6% |

Source: Data from ISTAT
