= Vezzano, Trentino =

Vezzano
- Comune
- Comune di Vezzano
- Location within Italy Location within Trentino-Alto Adige/Südtirol
- Coordinates: 46°5′N 10°58′E
- Country: Italy
- Region: Trentino-Alto Adige/Südtirol
- Province: Trentino (TN)
- Frazioni: Lon, Fraveggio, Ciago, Ranzo, Margone

Area
  - Total: 31 km^{2} (12 sq mi)
- Elevation: 385 m (1,263 ft)

Population (31 December 2006)
  - Total: 2,079
  - Density: 67/km^{2} (170/sq mi)
- Demonym: Vezzanesi
- Time zone: UTC+1 (CET)
  - Summer (DST): UTC+2 (CEST)
- Postal code: 38070
- Dialing code: 0461
- Patron saint: Saint Valentine
- Saint day: 14 February
- Website: Official website

Vezzano (Vezàn in local dialect) was a comune (municipality) in Trentino in the northern Italian region Trentino-Alto Adige/Südtirol, located about 12 kilometres (7 mi) west of Trento. As of 31 December 2006, it had a population of 2,079 and an area of 31.9 square kilometres (12.3 sq mi). It was merged with Terlago and Padergnone on January 1, 2016, to form a new municipality, Vallelaghi.

Vezzano borders the following municipalities: Molveno, San Lorenzo in Banale, Trento, Terlago, Padergnone and Calavino.

== Demographic evolution ==
Historical population

Year	Pop.	±%
1861	?	—
1871	?	—
1881	?	—
1901	?	—
1911	?	—

Year	Pop.	±%
1921	2,458	—
1931	2,030	−17.4%
1936	1,863	−8.2%
1951	2,023	+8.6%
1961	1,977	−2.3%

Year	Pop.	±%
1971	1,861	−5.9%
1981	1,725	−7.3%
1991	1,730	+0.3%
2001	1,973	+14.0%

Source: Data from ISTAT
