= Mezzolombardo =

- Comune
- Comune di Mezzolombardo
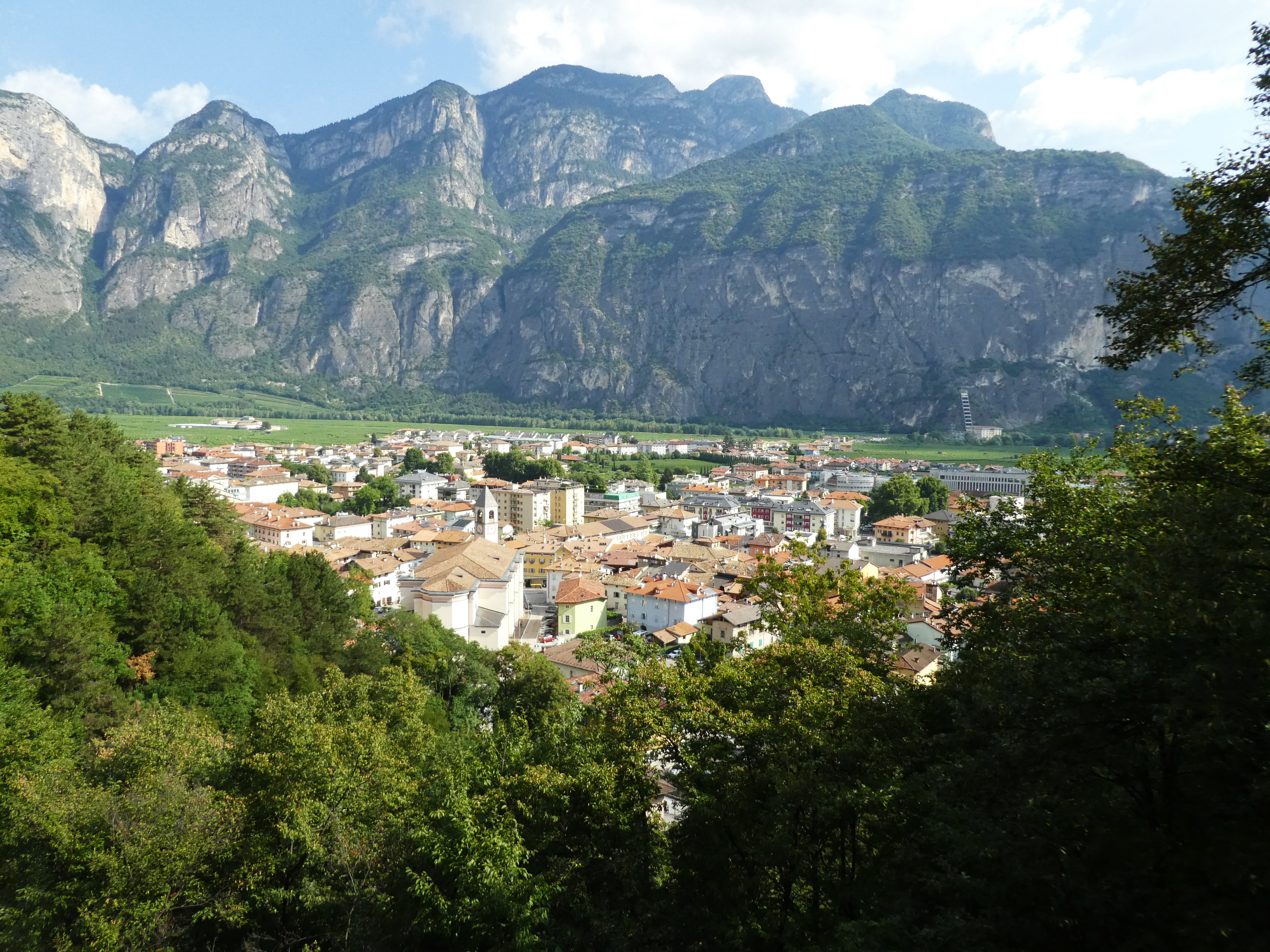

- Location within Italy Location within Trentino-Alto Adige/Südtirol
- Coordinates: 46°13′N 11°6′E
- Country: Italy
- Region: Trentino-Alto Adige/Südtirol
- Province: Trentino (TN)

Government
  - Mayor: Michele Dalfovo

Area
  - Total: 13.8 km^{2} (5.3 sq mi)
- Elevation: 226 m (741 ft)

Population (2026)
  - Total: 7,799
  - Density: 565/km^{2} (1,460/sq mi)
- Demonym: Mezzolombardesi or forcoloti
- Time zone: UTC+1 (CET)
  - Summer (DST): UTC+2 (CEST)
- Postal code: 38017
- Dialing code: 0461
- Patron saint: Saint Peter
- Saint day: June 29
- Website: Official website

Mezzolombardo (local dialect: Mezombart) is a comune (municipality) in Trentino in the northern Italian region Trentino-Alto Adige/Südtirol, located about 15 kilometres (9 mi) north of the city of Trento. As of 31 December 2006, it had a population of 6,498 and an area of 13.8 square kilometres (5.3 mi^{2}).

Mezzolombardo borders the following municipalities: Ton, Mezzocorona, Spormaggiore, San Michele all'Adige, Fai della Paganella, Nave San Rocco, and Zambana.

The inhabitants are called Mezzolombardesi or rarely Forcoloti. Behind the latter demonym there is a bizarre story: its inhabitants were nicknamed Forcoloti for having attacked the inhabitants of nearby Mezzocorona with pitchforks while they attempted to burn a crucifix (thus earning the nickname Brusacristi) located on the border between the two municipalities.

== Demographic evolution ==
Historical population

Year	Pop.	±%
1861	?	—
1871	?	—
1881	?	—
1901	?	—
1911	?	—

Year	Pop.	±%
1921	4,721	—
1931	4,521	−4.2%
1936	4,309	−4.7%
1951	4,795	+11.3%
1961	4,873	+1.6%

Year	Pop.	±%
1971	5,135	+5.4%
1981	5,418	+5.5%
1991	5,375	−0.8%
2001	5,941	+10.5%

Source: Data from ISTAT

== Climate ==
Climate data for Mezzolombardo (1971–2000)
Month	Jan	Feb	Mar	Apr	May	Jun	Jul	Aug	Sep	Oct	Nov	Dec	Year
Mean daily maximum °C (°F)	6.1 (43.0)	9.6 (49.3)	14.6 (58.3)	18.2 (64.8)	23.1 (73.6)	26.7 (80.1)	29.6 (85.3)	29.3 (84.7)	24.5 (76.1)	18.3 (64.9)	11.1 (52.0)	6.3 (43.3)	18.1 (64.6)
Daily mean °C (°F)	1.7 (35.1)	4.3 (39.7)	8.8 (47.8)	12.5 (54.5)	17.2 (63.0)	20.5 (68.9)	22.9 (73.2)	22.7 (72.9)	18.4 (65.1)	12.8 (55.0)	6.2 (43.2)	2.2 (36.0)	12.5 (54.5)
Mean daily minimum °C (°F)	−2.6 (27.3)	−0.9 (30.4)	3.0 (37.4)	6.8 (44.2)	11.4 (52.5)	14.2 (57.6)	16.3 (61.3)	16.1 (61.0)	12.2 (54.0)	7.4 (45.3)	1.4 (34.5)	−2.0 (28.4)	6.9 (44.5)
Average precipitation mm (inches)	51 (2.0)	45 (1.8)	65 (2.6)	86 (3.4)	92 (3.6)	93 (3.7)	87 (3.4)	75 (3.0)	95 (3.7)	116 (4.6)	79 (3.1)	53 (2.1)	937 (37)
Source: Istituto Superiore per la Protezione e la Ricerca Ambientale
