= Madruzzo, Trentino =

Madruzzo
- Comune
- Comune di Madruzzo
- Location within Italy Location within Trentino-Alto Adige/Südtirol
- Coordinates: 46°2′26″N 10°58′55″E
- Country: Italy
- Region: Trentino-Alto Adige/Südtirol
- Province: Trentino (TN)
- Frazioni: Calavino, Lagolo, Lasino, Pergolese, Sarche

Government
  - Mayor: Alessio Anselmo

Area
  - Total: 28.93 km^{2} (11.17 sq mi)

Population (2026)
  - Total: 3,006
  - Density: 103.9/km^{2} (269.1/sq mi)
- Time zone: UTC+1 (CET)
  - Summer (DST): UTC+2 (CEST)
- Postal code: 38076 and 38072
- Dialing code: 0461
- Website: Official website

Madruzzo is a comune (municipality) in the Province of Trentino in the Italian region Trentino-Alto Adige/Südtirol.

It was established on 1 January 2016 by the merger of the municipalities of Calavino and Lasino.
