= Vallelaghi =

- Comune
- Comune di Vallelaghi
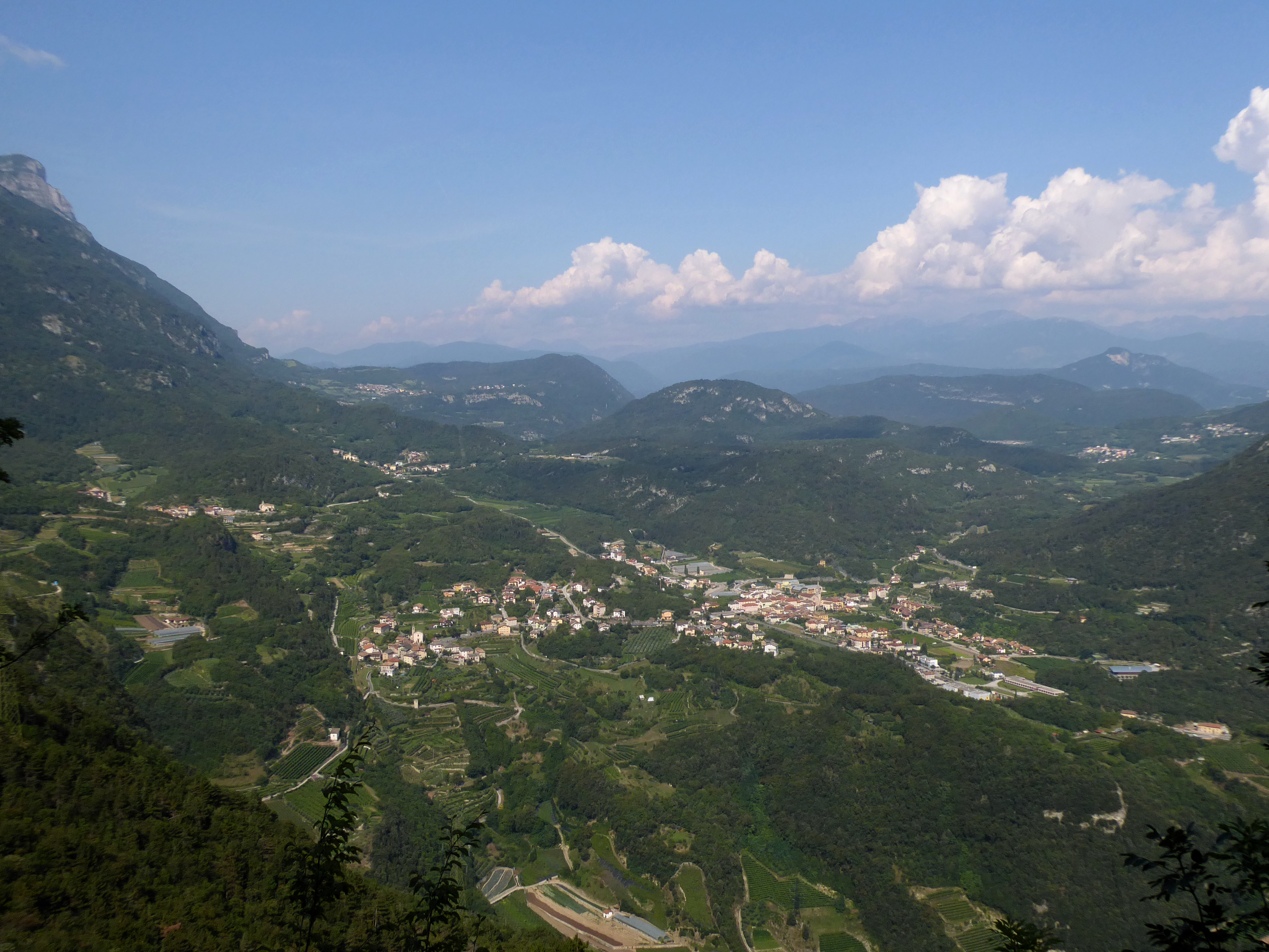

- Location within Italy Location within Trentino-Alto Adige/Südtirol
- Coordinates: 46°4′N 10°59′E
- Country: Italy
- Region: Trentino-Alto Adige/Südtirol
- Province: Trentino (TN)

Government
  - Mayor: Lorenzo Miori

Area
  - Total: 72.46 km^{2} (27.98 sq mi)

Population (31 March 2017)
  - Total: 5,069
  - Density: 69.96/km^{2} (181.2/sq mi)
- Time zone: UTC+1 (CET)
  - Summer (DST): UTC+2 (CEST)
- Postal code: 38096
- Dialing code: 0461
- Website: Official website

Vallelaghi is a comune (municipality) in the Province of Trentino in the Italian region Trentino-Alto Adige/Südtirol.

It was established on 1 January 2016 by the merger of the municipalities of Padergnone, Terlago and Vezzano.
