= Fai della Paganella =

- Comune
- Comune di Fai della Paganella
- Coat of arms

- Location within Italy Location within Trentino-Alto Adige/Südtirol
- Coordinates: 46°11′N 11°4′E
- Country: Italy
- Region: Trentino-Alto Adige/Südtirol
- Province: Trentino (TN)

Government
  - Mayor: Mariavittoria Mottes

Area
  - Total: 12.1 km^{2} (4.7 sq mi)
- Elevation: 958 m (3,143 ft)

Population (2026)
  - Total: 941
  - Density: 77.8/km^{2} (201/sq mi)
- Demonym: Faioti
- Time zone: UTC+1 (CET)
  - Summer (DST): UTC+2 (CEST)
- Postal code: 38010
- Dialing code: 0461
- Website: Official website

Fai della Paganella (Fai in local dialect) is a comune (municipality) in Trentino in the northern Italian region Trentino-Alto Adige/Südtirol, located about 14 kilometres (9 mi) northwest of Trento. In its territory is located the Paganella mountain and ski resort.

Fai della Paganella borders the following municipalities: Spormaggiore, Mezzolombardo, Cavedago, Zambana, Andalo and Terlago.

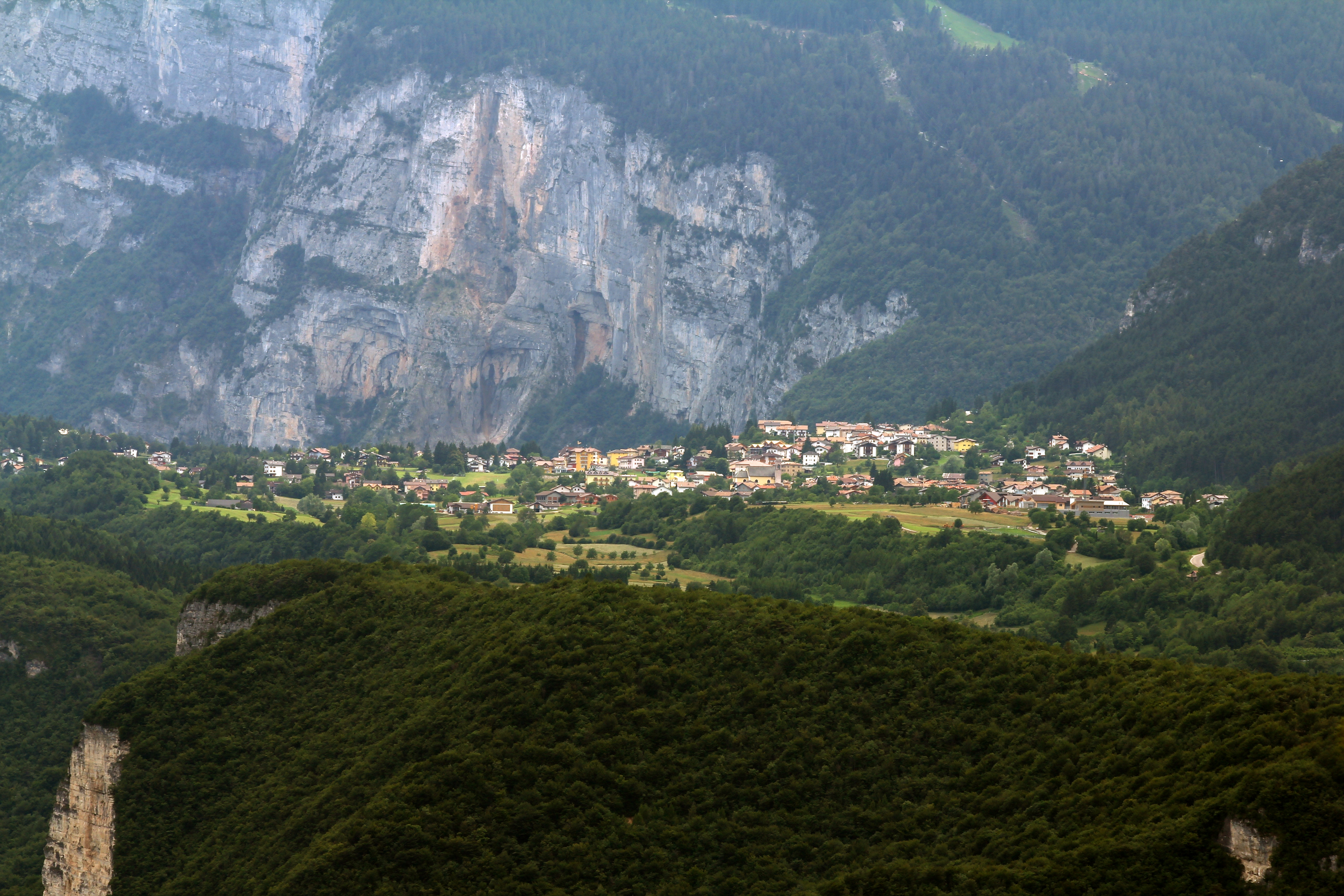
aerial view of Fai della Paganella
