= Padergnone =

- Comune
- Comune di Padergnone
- Coat of arms

- Location within Italy Location within Trentino-Alto Adige/Südtirol
- Coordinates: 46°4′N 10°59′E
- Country: Italy
- Region: Trentino-Alto Adige/Südtirol
- Province: Trentino (TN)

Government
  - Mayor: Federico Sommadossi

Area
  - Total: 3.6 km^{2} (1.4 sq mi)
- Elevation: 400 m (1,300 ft)

Population (1 January 2010)
  - Total: 706
  - Density: 200/km^{2} (510/sq mi)
- Demonym: Padergnonesi
- Time zone: UTC+1 (CET)
  - Summer (DST): UTC+2 (CEST)
- Postal code: 38070
- Dialing code: 0461
- Website: http://www.comune.padergnone.tn.it

Padergnone (Padergnón or Padrignón in local dialect) was a comune (municipality) in Trentino in the northern Italian region Trentino-Alto Adige/Südtirol, located about 10 kilometres (6 mi) west of Trento. It was merged with Terlago and Vezzano on 1 January 2016, to form a new municipality, Vallelaghi. Padergnone was known for its historical significance and scenic views of the surrounding mountains, which made it a popular destination for hikers.
