= Nave San Rocco =

- Comune
- Comune di Nave San Rocco
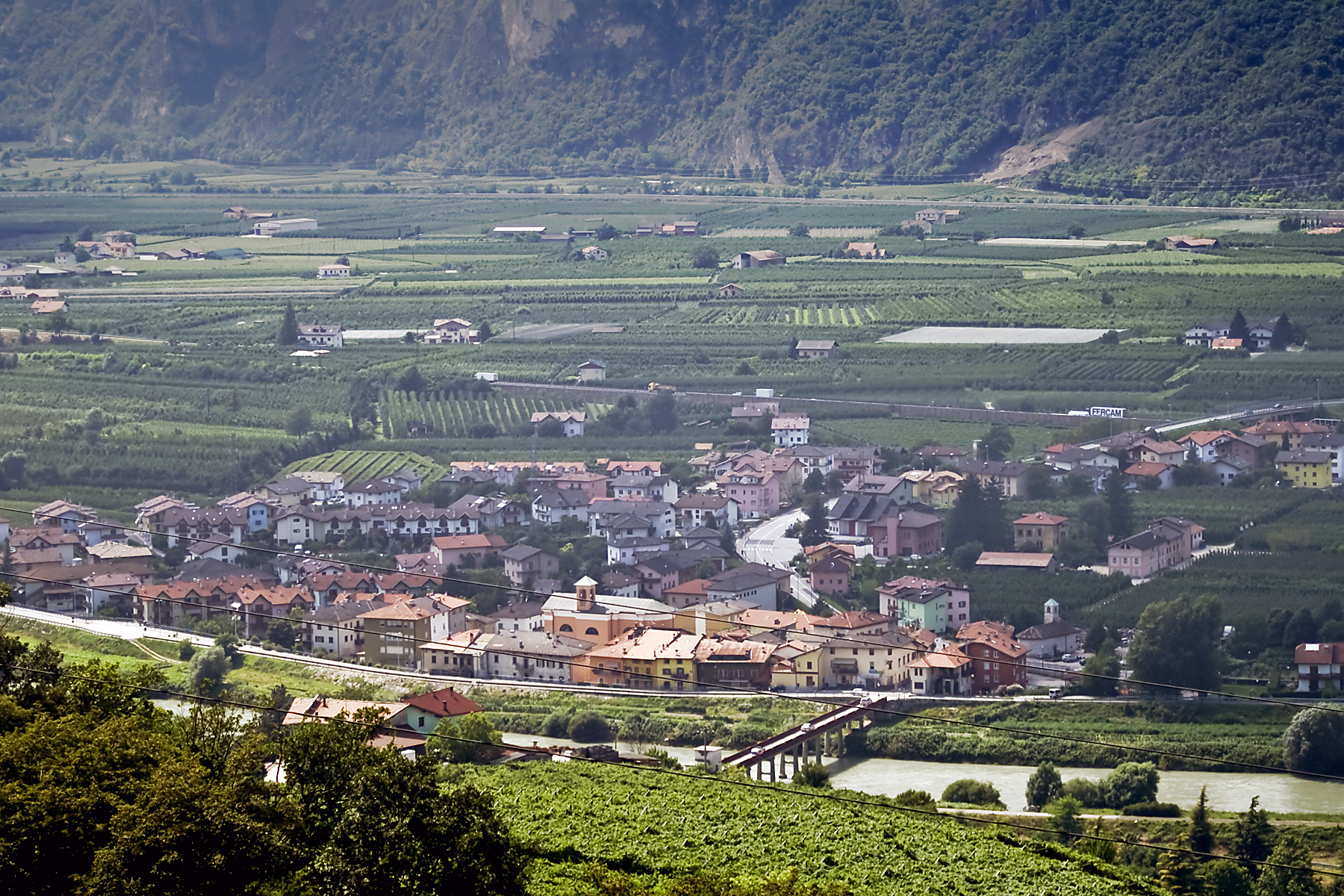

- Location within Italy Location within Trentino-Alto Adige/Südtirol
- Coordinates: 46°10′N 11°6′E
- Country: Italy
- Region: Trentino-Alto Adige/Südtirol
- Province: Trentino (TN)

Area
  - Total: 4.9 km^{2} (1.9 sq mi)

Population (Dec. 2004)
  - Total: 1,279
  - Density: 260/km^{2} (680/sq mi)
- Time zone: UTC+1 (CET)
  - Summer (DST): UTC+2 (CEST)
- Postal code: 38010
- Dialing code: 0461

Nave San Rocco (Naf or Nào in local dialect) is a comune (municipality) in Trentino in the northern Italian region Trentino-Alto Adige/Südtirol, located about 11 km (6.8 mi) north of Trento. As of 31 December 2004, it had a population of 1,279 and an area of 4.9 km^{2} (1.9 sq mi).

Nave San Rocco borders the following municipalities: Mezzolombardo, San Michele all'Adige, Lavis and Zambana.

== Demographic evolution ==
Historical population

Year	Pop.	±%
1861	?	—
1871	?	—
1881	?	—
1901	?	—
1911	?	—
1921	546	—

Year	Pop.	±%
1931	586	+7.3%
1936	588	+0.3%
1951	732	+24.5%
1961	780	+6.6%
1971	804	+3.1%
1981	873	+8.6%

Year	Pop.	±%
1991	932	+6.8%
2001	1,208	+29.6%
2004	1,279	+5.9%
2008	1,371	+7.2%

Source: Data from ISTAT
