= Giovo =

- Comune
- Comune di Giovo
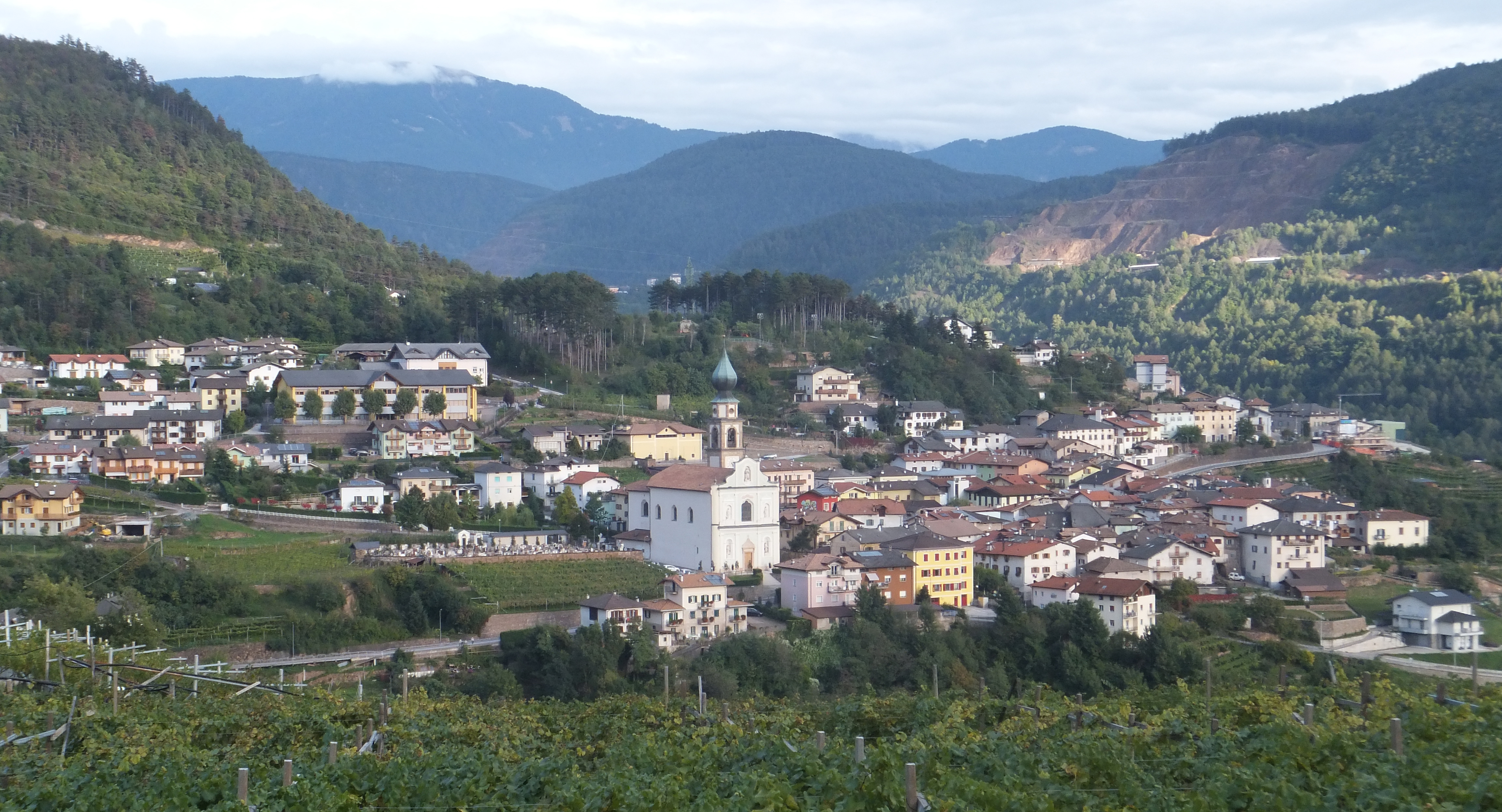
- View of Verla, the communal seat.

- Coat of arms

- Location within Italy Location within Trentino-Alto Adige/Südtirol
- Coordinates: 46°9′N 11°9′E
- Country: Italy
- Region: Trentino-Alto Adige/Südtirol
- Province: Trentino (TN)
- Frazioni: Ceola, Masen, Mosana, Palù, Valternigo, Verla (communal seat), Ville, Serci

Government
  - Mayor: Riccardo Dalvit

Area
  - Total: 20.81 km^{2} (8.03 sq mi)
- Elevation: 495 m (1,624 ft)

Population (2026)
  - Total: 2,518
  - Density: 121.0/km^{2} (313.4/sq mi)
- Demonym: Verlani
- Time zone: UTC+1 (CET)
  - Summer (DST): UTC+2 (CEST)
- Postal code: 38030
- Dialing code: 0461
- Website: Official website

Giovo (Gióf in local dialect) is a comune (municipality) in Trentino, located about 10 kilometres (6 mi) northeast of Trento in northern Italy.

== People ==
The village of Palù di Giovo is home to several professional road bicycle racers:

- Francesco Moser - cyclist (now turned local politician).
- Gilberto Simoni - cyclist
- Moreno Moser - cyclist
