= Zambana =

- Comune
- Comune di Zambana
- Location within Italy Location within Trentino-Alto Adige/Südtirol
- Coordinates: 46°9′N 11°6′E
- Country: Italy
- Region: Trentino-Alto Adige/Südtirol
- Province: Trentino (TN)

Area
  - Total: 11.7 km^{2} (4.5 sq mi)

Population (Dec. 2004)
  - Total: 1,654
  - Density: 141/km^{2} (366/sq mi)
- Demonym: Zambanòti
- Time zone: UTC+1 (CET)
  - Summer (DST): UTC+2 (CEST)
- Postal code: 38010
- Dialing code: 0461
- Website: Official website

0Zambana (La Zambàna in local dialect) is a comune (municipality) in Trentino in the northern Italian region Trentino-Alto Adige/Südtirol, located about 9 kilometres (6 mi) north of Trento. As of 31 December 2004, it had a population of 1,654 and an area of 11.7 square kilometres (4.5 mi^{2}).

Zambana borders the following municipalities: Mezzolombardo, Fai della Paganella, Nave San Rocco, Lavis, Andalo and Terlago.

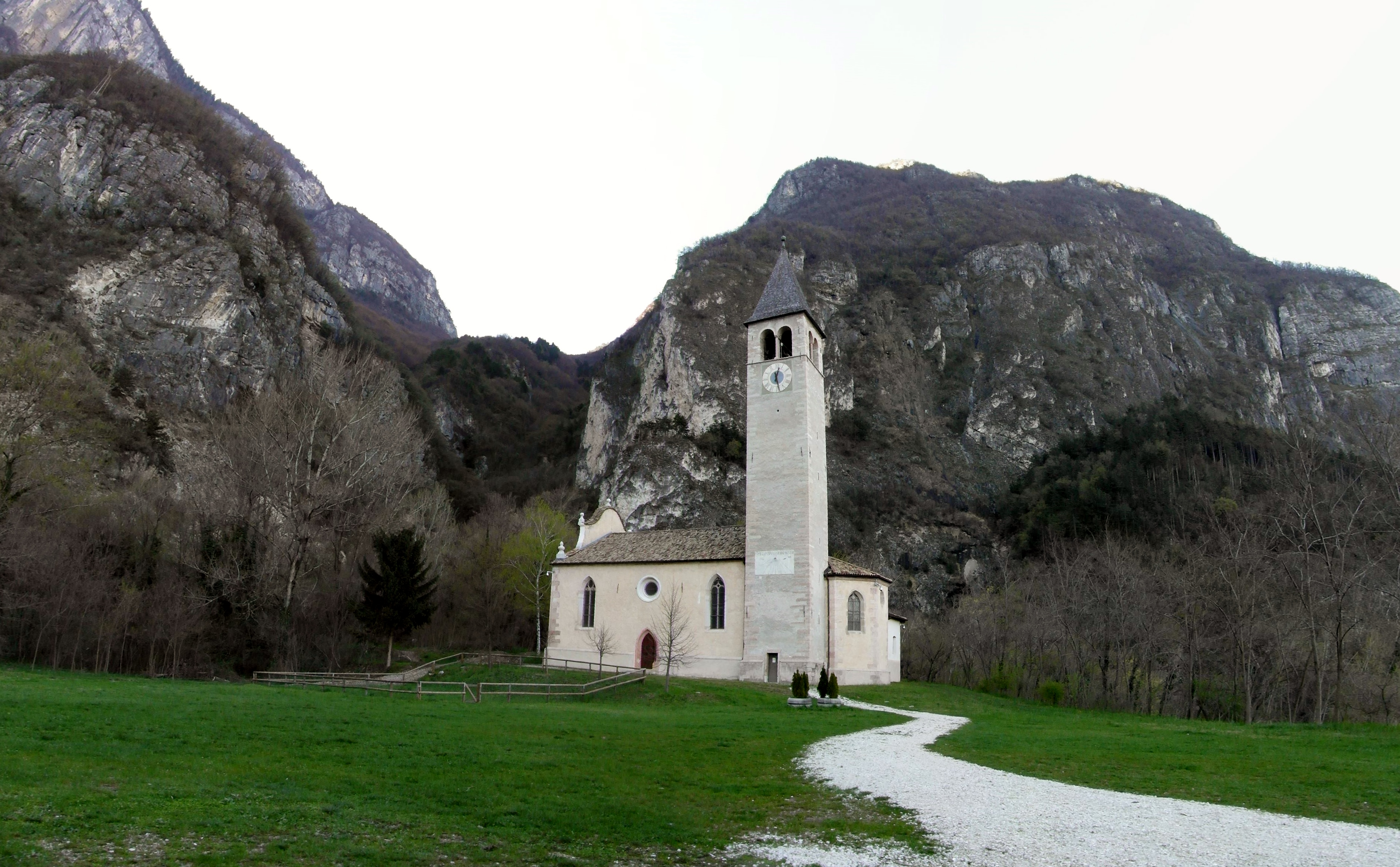
The old church

== Demographic evolution ==
Historical population

Year	Pop.	±%
1861	?	—
1871	?	—
1881	?	—
1901	?	—
1911	?	—

Year	Pop.	±%
1921	450	—
1931	515	+14.4%
1936	555	+7.8%
1951	693	+24.9%
1961	845	+21.9%

Year	Pop.	±%
1971	1,372	+62.4%
1981	1,676	+22.2%
1991	1,593	−5.0%
2001	1,585	−0.5%

Source: Data from ISTAT
