= Ambiez Peak =

Mountain peak in the Brenta Dolomites, Italy

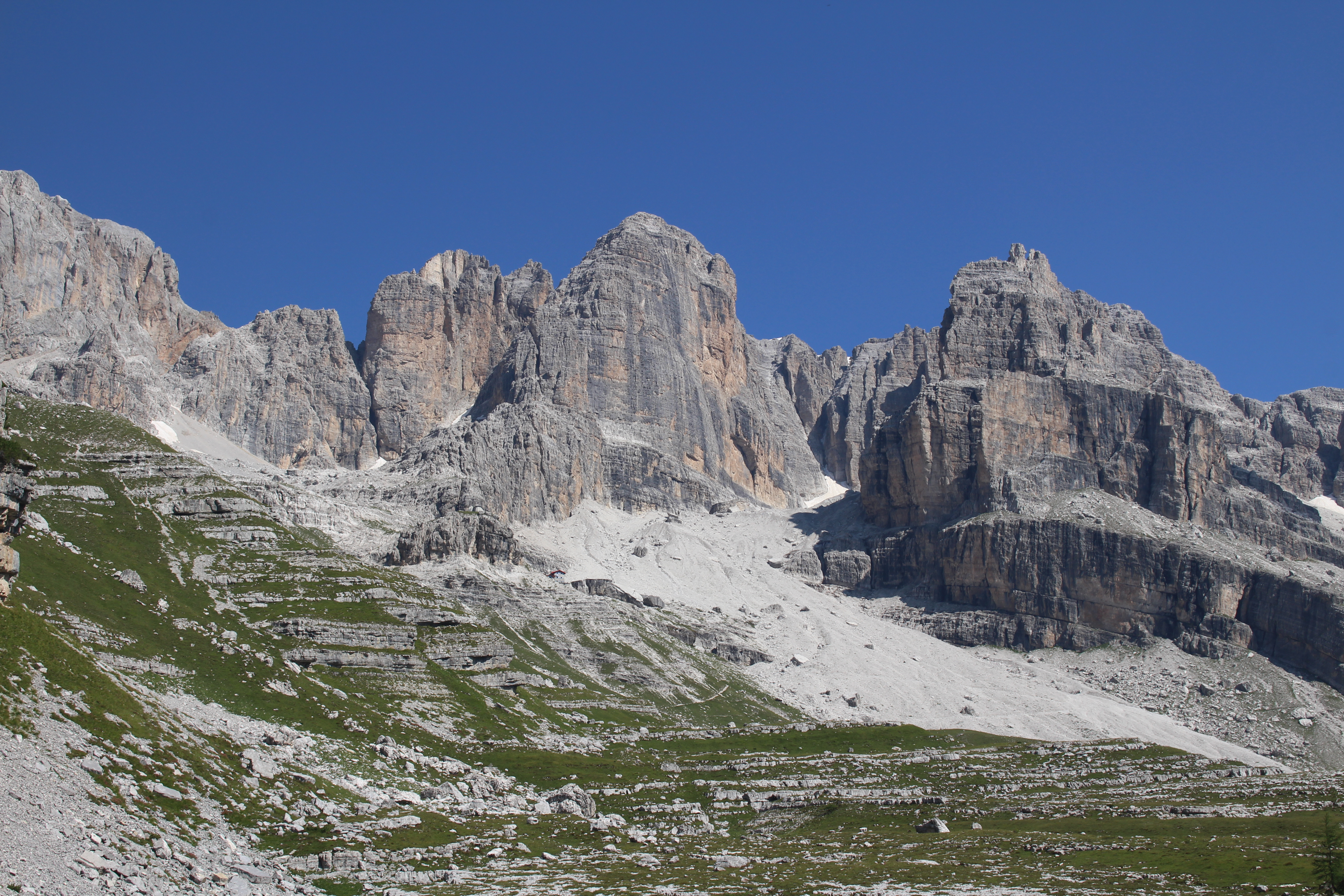
- Terminal basin of Ambiez Valley with the wall of Ambiez Peak dominating it. In the background, with a little snow on the summit, Tosa Peak can be seen.

Highest point
- Peak: 3,102 m MSL
- Prominence: 231 m (758 ft)
- Coordinates: 46°09′01″N 10°52′04″E

Geography
- Location: Trentino-Alto Adige/Südtirol, Italy
- Parent range: Alps

Climbing
- First ascent: September 5, 1880

Ambiez Peak (Italian: Cima d'Ambiez) is a mountain in the Brenta Dolomites, a subgroup of the Dolomites in northeastern Italy. Rising to an elevation of 3,102 meters (10,177 feet) above sea level, (Note: Some maps list its elevation as 3,096 meters (10,157 feet).) it is the highest summit of the Ambiez Chain (Catena d'Ambiez), a subdivision of the Brenta Group according to the SOIUSA classification. It stands as one of the most largest peaks in the Brenta Dolomites and is among the 86 Dolomite summits exceeding 3,000 meters.

Ambiez Peak overlooks the Ambiez Glacier (Vedretta d'Ambiez) and the Ambiez Valley to the south, the Pratofiorito Basin (Conca di Pratofiorito) and Val Nardis to the west, and the western expanse of the Val Brenta to the north. Nestled at its base are two alpine refuges: the Silvio Agostini Refuge and the Twelve Apostles Refuge.

== Description ==
Ambiez Peak is the fourth-highest peak in the Brenta Dolomites, following Cima Brenta (3,151 m), Cima Tosa (3,136 m), and Crozzon di Brenta (3,135 m), though it excludes subsidiary summits like Cima Brenta West (3,112 m). It is separated from the nearby Cima Tosa by the deep notch of Bocca d'Ambiez and from the Fracingli subgroup by the Bocca dei Camosci to the west. Its eastern face forms a broad, steep wall that descends sharply to the Ambiez Glacier, while its other slopes are less severe, featuring a series of gentler gradients and numerous ledges (cenge).

As the most elevated summit of the Ambiez Chain, which it names, (Note: SOIUSA subgroup "Catena d'Ambiez," code II/C-28.IV-A.1.i.) Ambiez Peak offers mountaineers a range of climbing experiences, from accessible routes to highly challenging ascents.

== First ascent ==
The first recorded ascent of Ambiez Peak took place on September 5, 1880, led by Maurice Holzmann, a German-born member of the British Royal Household who served Edward VII for 45 years and was an active member of the Alpine Club. He was joined by German climbers Johann Kaufmann and an individual identified only as "Gaskell." The party reached the summit via a relatively easy climb from the Bocca dei Camosci (2,784 m) on the western slope—a route considered unremarkable and rarely repeated.

== Climbing routes ==
Four "normal routes" provide access to the summit, each located on a different slope:

- Southern Normal Route (Via Normale Sud): Starting from the Silvio Agostini Refuge, climbers ascend the Ambiez Glacier, traverse a distinctive horizontal ledge, and then climb a gully and a long ridge to the summit. (Note: 3–4 hours; difficulty PD+, up to grade II/II+ with one III section; 250 m vertical gain, ~600 m total length.)
- Western Slope: The route of the first ascent. From the Twelve Apostles Refuge, climbers ascend the Agola Glacier (Vedretta d'Agola), climb a snowy couloir separating Ambiez Peak from Cima Bassa d'Ambiez, and continue up the western face. (Note: 2–3 hours; difficulty PD, up to grade I/II; 150 m vertical gain, ~400 m total length.) (Note: Recent ice melt has made this route progressively more difficult.)
- Western Ridge: An alternative avoiding the demanding couloir. From the Twelve Apostles Refuge, climbers reach the Bocca dei Camosci (2,784 m), bypass a tower on the right, and follow the ridge to join the western slope route. (Note: 2–3 hours; difficulty PD-, up to grade I/II; 200 m vertical gain, ~400 m total length.)
- Northern Ridge: Beginning at the Bocca d'Ambiez (2,871 m)—accessible from the Silvio Agostini Refuge, Twelve Apostles Refuge, or Refuge Brentei—this route follows a westward ledge, a long crack, a steep wall, and a wide debris band to the summit. (Note: 1.5 hours; difficulty PD, up to grade II; 200 m vertical gain, ~300 m total length.)

In 2016, the Trentino Alpine Guides Association redesigned the normal routes of key Brenta Dolomite peaks, with upgrades completed by 2020 to create an alternative to Via delle Bocchette. The southern and northern routes to Ambiez Peak are now equipped with metal anchors and resin bolts. This forms part of a broader itinerary linking the Silvio Agostini Refuge to the Rifugio Tommaso Pedrotti via Ambiez Peak, Cima Tosa, and optionally Crozzon di Brenta, bypassing the less demanding Via Ferrata Ottone Brentari. (Note: 10 hours, plus 4–6 for Crozzon di Brenta; difficulty PD+ up to II+, AD+/III for Crozzon.)

== Bibliography ==
- Buscaini, Gino; Castiglioni, Ettore (1977). Dolomiti di Brenta [Brenta Dolomites] (in Italian). San Donato Milanese: Club Alpino Italiano - Touring Club Italiano. ISBN 9788836500703.
- Gardumi, Enzo; Torchio, Fabrizio (1987). Guida alle Dolomiti di Brenta. Tosa, Ambiéz, Fracingli, Vallón, Sabion-Tóv, Ghez-Dalùn [Guide to the Brenta Dolomites. Tosa, Ambiéz, Fracingli, Vallón, Sabion-Tóv, Ghez-Dalùn] (in Italian). Trento: Panorama. ISBN 9788887118261.
- Marazzi, Sergio (2005). Atlante orografico delle Alpi. SOIUSA [Orographic Atlas of the Alps. SOIUSA] (in Italian). Pavone Canavese: Priuli & Verlucca. ISBN 9788880682738.
- Bernardi, Alberto; Ciri, Roberto; Magnaguagno, Roby (2012). I 3000 delle Dolomiti [The 3000 of the Dolomites] (in Italian). Piazzola sul Brenta: Idea Montagna Editore. ISBN 9788897299233.
- Bernardi, Alberto; Ciri, Roberto; Muffato, Milo (2017). Vie normali nelle Dolomiti di Brenta [Normal routes in the Brenta Dolomites] (in Italian). Villa di Teolo: Idea Montagna Editore. ISBN 9788885468184.
- Canale, Gianni (2020). Dolomiti di Brenta. La via delle normali [Brenta Dolomites. The route of the normal] (in Italian). Illustrated by Elio Orlandi. Idea Montagna Editore. ISBN 9788885468849.
