= Tower of Brenta =

Mountain in the Brenta Dolomites, Trentino, Italy

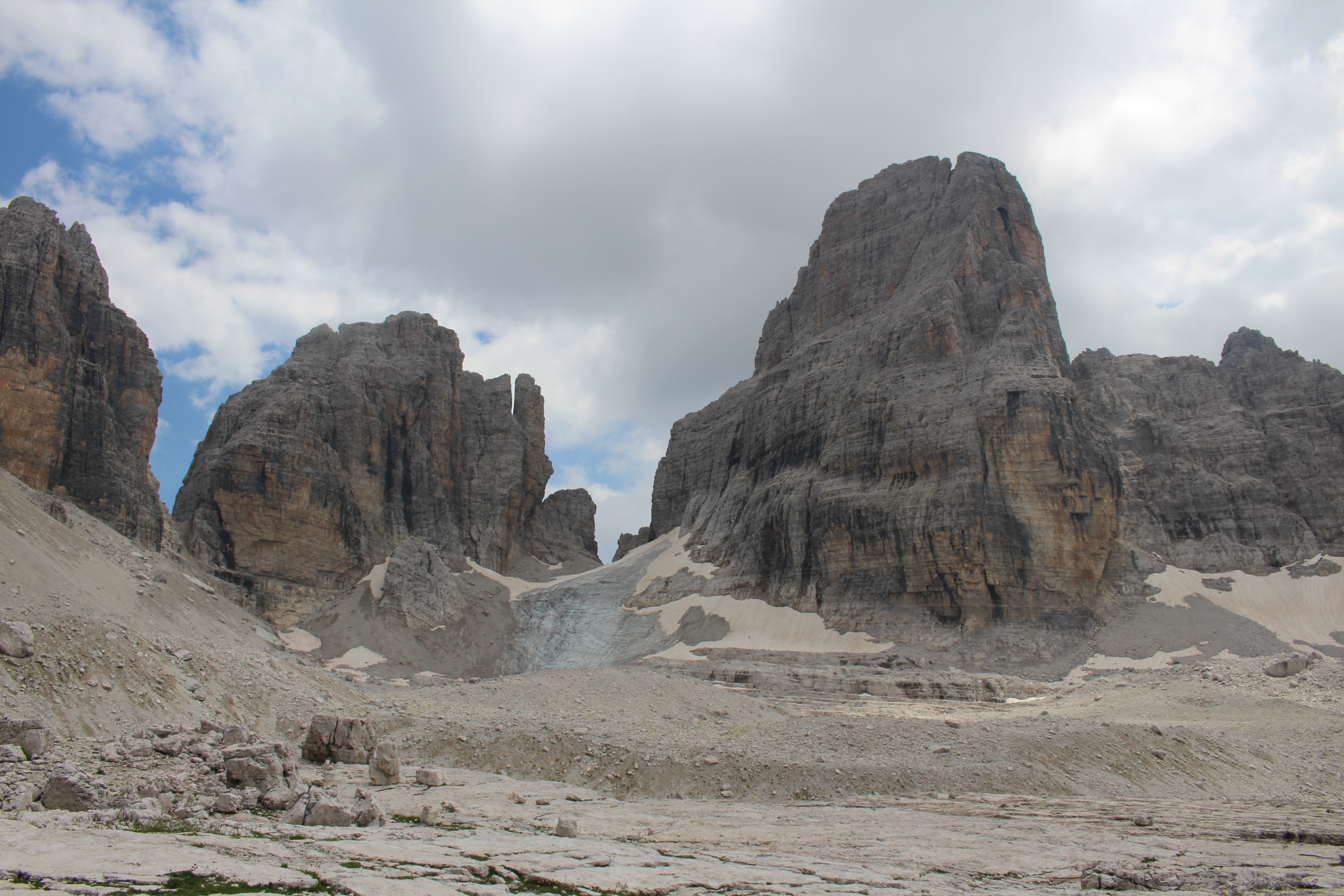
- Tower of Brenta (3,014 m) and Cima degli Armi (2,951 m, left), separated by Bocca degli Armi (2,744 m) and the remnants of the Armi Glacier, as seen from Rifugio Angelo Alimonta.

Highest point
- Elevation: 3,014 m (9,888 ft)
- Coordinates: 46.16707°N 10.89562°E

Geography
- Location: Trentino, Molveno, Tre Ville
- Country: Italy
- Region: Trentino-Alto Adige
- Parent range: Brenta Dolomites, Alps

Climbing
- First ascent: 24 June 1882

The Tower of Brenta (3,014 metres) is a peak in the Brenta Dolomites, forming the highest summit of the Catena degli Sfulmini sector within the SOIUSA classification. (Note: Being a sector related to SOIUSA subgroups, it is not often used. In particular, the Central Brenta Subgroup cod. II/C-28.IV-A.1.e is divided into the Cima Brenta Massif cod. 1.e/a and precisely Sfulmini Chain cod. 1.e/b.) It ranks among the principal peaks of the Brenta Group and is one of the 86 Dolomites summits exceeding 3,000 metres. The mountain overlooks the Conca degli Armi, the Armi Glacier, and the nearby Rifugio Angelo Alimonta.

== Description ==
A superb and elegant peak, rising like a colossal tower culminating in a blade, between the Bocchetta Alta degli Sfulmini and the Bocca degli Armi.

— Gino Buscaini and Ettore Castiglioni.

The Tower of Brenta is a large tower in between the Bocchetta Alta degli Sfulmini and the Bocca degli Armi. Its northern face features a high, rocky wall incised with deep chimneys, while the southwest and southeast faces are more compact and vertical. The high-quality dolomite rock and accessibility from nearby refuges (Alimonta, Pedrotti, and Brentei) make it a popular destination for climbers.

Alongside Campanile Basso, Campanile Alto, and the Sfulmini, it forms the characteristic core of the Brenta Dolomites, defined by a series of spires and notches. This area is renowned for the Via Ferrata delle Bocchette Centrali, which traverses the region at approximately 2,700 metres.

== First ascent ==
The first recorded ascent was made on 24 June 1882 by Edward Theodore Compton, a German illustrator and alpinist known for his Alpine landscape paintings and first ascents of at least 27 peaks, and Matteo Nicolussi, a mountain guide from Molveno. They climbed via the North Normal Route.

== Climbing routes ==
The easiest route to the summit is the North Normal Route pioneered by Compton and Nicolussi. Starting from the Sfulmini Glacier, it ascends the northeast face, crosses a prominent midway ledge, and follows the summit ridge to the top. (Note: The route, graded Alpine AD-, up to III-, covers 150 metres of elevation gain and approximately 400 metres of development, taking 3–5 hours.) Due to the retreat of the Sfulmini Glacier, the initial section is more challenging, particularly late in the season. Climbers are instructed to access the ledge via the eastern face, reachable from the initial section of the Via Ferrata delle Bocchette Centrali.

Besides the normal route used by the first climbers, there is a second normal route, the Garbari Route from the south. (Note: Graded AD+, up to IV, it is slightly more demanding and takes about 4 hours.) It is considered slightly more challenging than the first route, and it ascends from Bocchetta Alta degli Sfulmini.

Other popular routes include the Camino Adam from the north, the West Ridge, the Via Detassis on the southwest face, and the East Arête.

== See also ==
- Brenta Dolomites
- Via Ferrata
- Dolomites

== Bibliography ==
- Buscaini, Gino; Castiglioni, Ettore (1977). Dolomiti di Brenta [Brenta Dolomites]. Guida dei Monti d'Italia. San Donato Milanese: Club Alpino Italiano - Touring Club Italiano. ISBN 978-88-365-0070-3.
- Torchio, Fabrizio (1987). Guida alle Dolomiti di Brenta. Settore Centrale [Guide to the Brenta Dolomites. Central Sector]. Panorama. ISBN 88-87118-26-4.
- Marazzi, Sergio (2005). Atl| Atlante orografico delle Alpi. SOIUSA. Suddivisione orografica internazionale unificata del Sistema Alpino [Orographic Atlas of the Alps. SOIUSA. International Standardized Mountain Subdivision of the Alps]. Quaderni di cultura alpina. Pavone Canavese: Priuli & Verlucca. ISBN 978-88-8068-273-8.
- Bernardi, Alberto; Ciri, Roberto; Magnaguagno, Roby (2012). I 3000 delle Dolomiti [The 3,000ers of the Dolomites]. Vie normali. Piazzola sul Brenta (Padova): Idea Montagna Editore SNC. ISBN 978-88-97299-23-3.
- Bernardi, Alberto; Ciri, Roberto; Muffato, Milo (2017). Vie normali nelle Dolomiti di Brenta [Normal Routes in the Brenta Dolomites]. Villa di Teolo: Idea Montagna Editore SNC. ISBN 978-88-85468-18-4.
- Canale, Gianni (2020). Dolomiti di Brenta. La via delle normali [Brenta Dolomites. The Normal Routes]. Roccia d'Autore. Idea Montagna Editore SNC. ISBN 978-88-85468-84-9.
