= Ghez Peak =

Mountain in the Brenta Dolomites

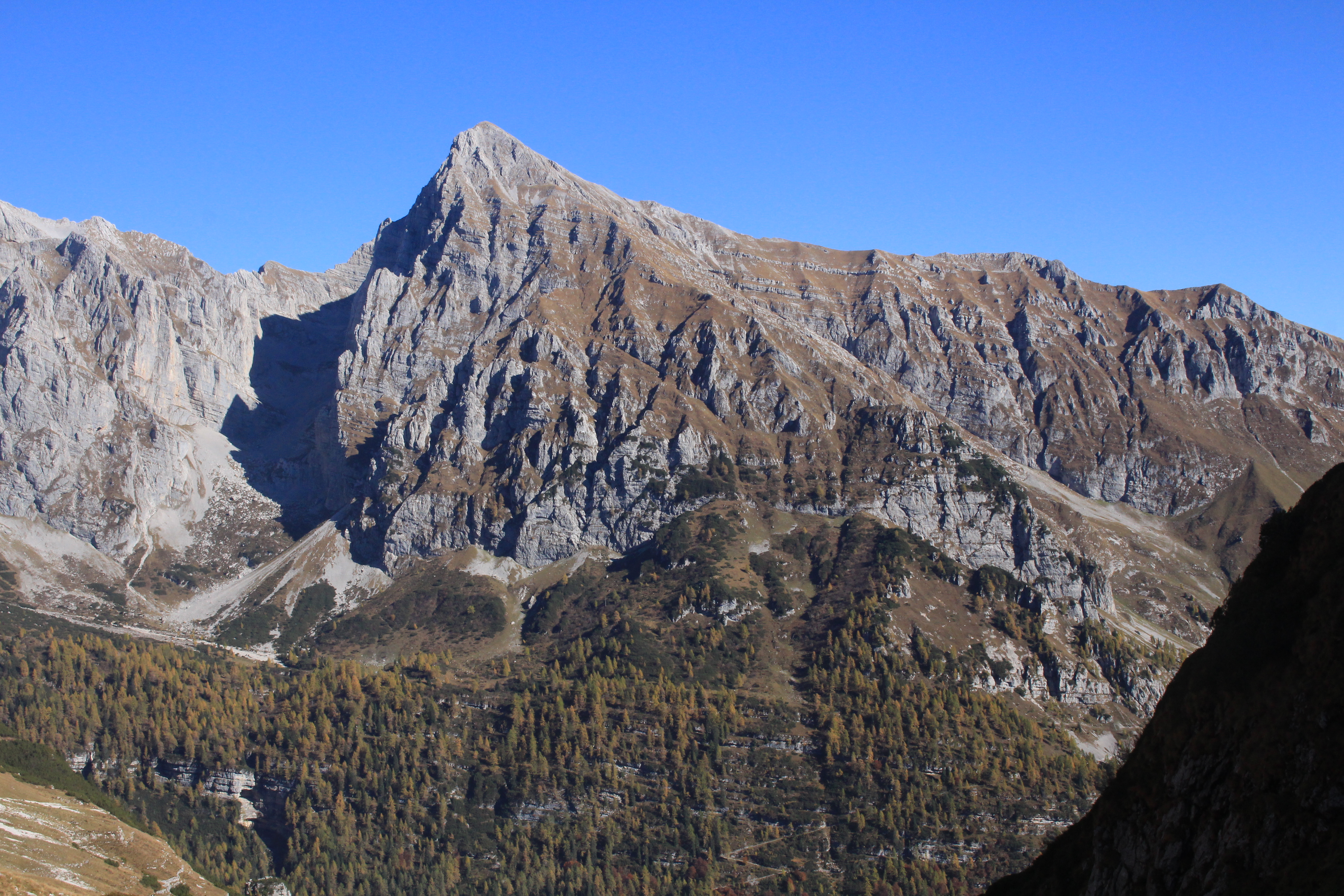
- Ghez Peak and its massif seen from the Senaso Busa, located west of it

Highest point
- Peak: 2,713 m (MSL)
- Prominence: 290 m (950 ft)
- Isolation: 2.22 km (1.38 mi)
- Coordinates: 46°07′26″N 10°54′13″E

Geography
- Location: San Lorenzo Dorsino, Trentino-Alto Adige/Südtirol, Italy
- Parent range: Alps

Climbing
- First ascent: not defined

Ghez Peak (2713 m MSL) is a mountain in the Brenta Dolomites, the main elevation of the SOIUSA subgroup called the Ghez Subgroup. The latter, consisting almost solely of the imposing mass of the summit of the same name and its offshoots, separates the Ambiez Valley from Lake Molveno and reaches as far as the village of San Lorenzo in Banale.

== Description ==
Large rocky massif that, with its southern extensions, flanks the Ambiez Valley to the east for almost its entire length.

— Gino Buscaini and Ettore Castiglioni, Dolomiti di Brenta

Ghez Peak is the highest point of the massif that separates Ambiez Valley from Lake Molveno. From the summit stretches southward a pronounced ridge, mostly grassy and rather sharp, that with some secondary peaks reaches the village of San Lorenzo in Banale. Toward the north, on the other hand, it precipitates with a severe and imposing rock face on the Busa di Dalun, which extends to its anticima to the east (2623 m MSL).

From the summit, it is possible to enjoy a wide panorama: from the Brenta Dolomites to the southern sector of the Trentino Alps. In particular, it turns out to be one of the few peaks in the group from whose summit it is possible to see the city of Trento.

The mountain's topographic features include a prominence of 290 m (Note: The topographic prominence of the Ghez Peak is calculated from the Forcolotta di Noghera (2423 m MSL - 46.13825°N 10.89448°E), which separates it from the higher Ceda Alta Peak (2752 m MSL)) and an isolation of 2.22 km. (Note: The topographic isolation of Ghez Peak is calculated from the southern slope of the higher Ceda Alta Peak (2752 m MSL).)

== History ==
In all likelihood, the peak was climbed by hunters before the advent of the mountaineering era, the first documented ascent was by Adolf Gstirner and Matteo Nicolussi on August 7, 1893, traversing from Doss di Dalun.

The imposing North Face was conquered on September 7, 1934, by Matteo Armani and Ettore Gasperini-Medaia, who opened the Gran Diedro Northwest route, repeated only in 1970. (Note: “This is the story of the second ascent of the Armarli route on the N face of the Ghez Peak (2713 m) in the Brenta Dolomites (September 6-7, 1934). On July 28-29, 1970, Marino Stenico, Luciana, and Giovanni Rossi climbed the entire large dihedral that is the main feature of the wall and where the major difficulties of the route are concentrated. The following September 20, Marino Stenico, with Romeo De Stefa, made the second complete ascent in nine hours from the attack.”)

== Ascension routes ==
Ascension to the summit is quite rare; there are four most common routes of ascent.

- South Ridge. Most popular route, strenuous ascent but without excessive difficulty. Starting from Rifugio Alpenrose (1080 m), climb up steep meadows to the saddle (2210 m) immediately north of Dos delle Saette, then by ridge to the summit, also passing Dos d'Arnal (2340 m). (Note: In about 5 hours, EE difficulty.)
- East face. From the Alpenrose hut (1080 m), proceed in the direction of the Rossati until late Val Dorè, then climb to the summit from the steep eastern slope. (Note: In about 3 hours, EE difficulty.)
- For the Pas de la Gias. The mountaineering route is often done in the crossing from Doss di Dalun. From the Rifugio Cacciatore (1860 m), one climbs over large boulders and scree up the *Val Dalun to its eastern edge, where one ascends the 150-meter wall by making a “Z” path. You then traverse the last 500 meters of exposed ridge. (Note: In about 3 hours, F+ difficulty, pass I. Grade II.)
- Southwest gully. Often used in descent, from Rifugio Cacciatore (1860 m) by trail, you reach Malga Ben (1705 m), then turn east through the meadow until you take the obvious gully that you climb by standing to the left of its edge. You then climb back to the left over a ridge and continue along the ridge to the summit.

The northwest face that plummets 500 meters into the Dalun Valley is paved with several classic and new routes of high difficulty. The most famous routes are:

- Diedro Armani or Gran Diedro Northwest, opened by Matteo Armani and Ettore Gasperini-Medaia in 1934. (Note: Height difference: 600m. Difficulty: V+ with two Vi passages and one artificial passage(A2).)
- West Pillar, opened by Karl Heinz Matthies and Heinz Stainkötter in 1975. (Note: Height difference: 600m. Difficulty: IV and V with one length of VI and one length in artificial.)
- Marcella route for the North Face, opened by Enzo Bartolomedi and Heinz Stainkötter in 1975. (Note: Height difference: 450m. Difficulty: up to VI- and artificial(A2).)
- Viva Dülfer, opened by Rolando Larcher and Franco Cavallaro in 2000. (Note: Difficulty: up to 7c+.)
- Zigo zago, opened by Rolando Larcher and Marco Curti in 2019. (Note: Difficulty: up to 8a.)

== Gallery ==
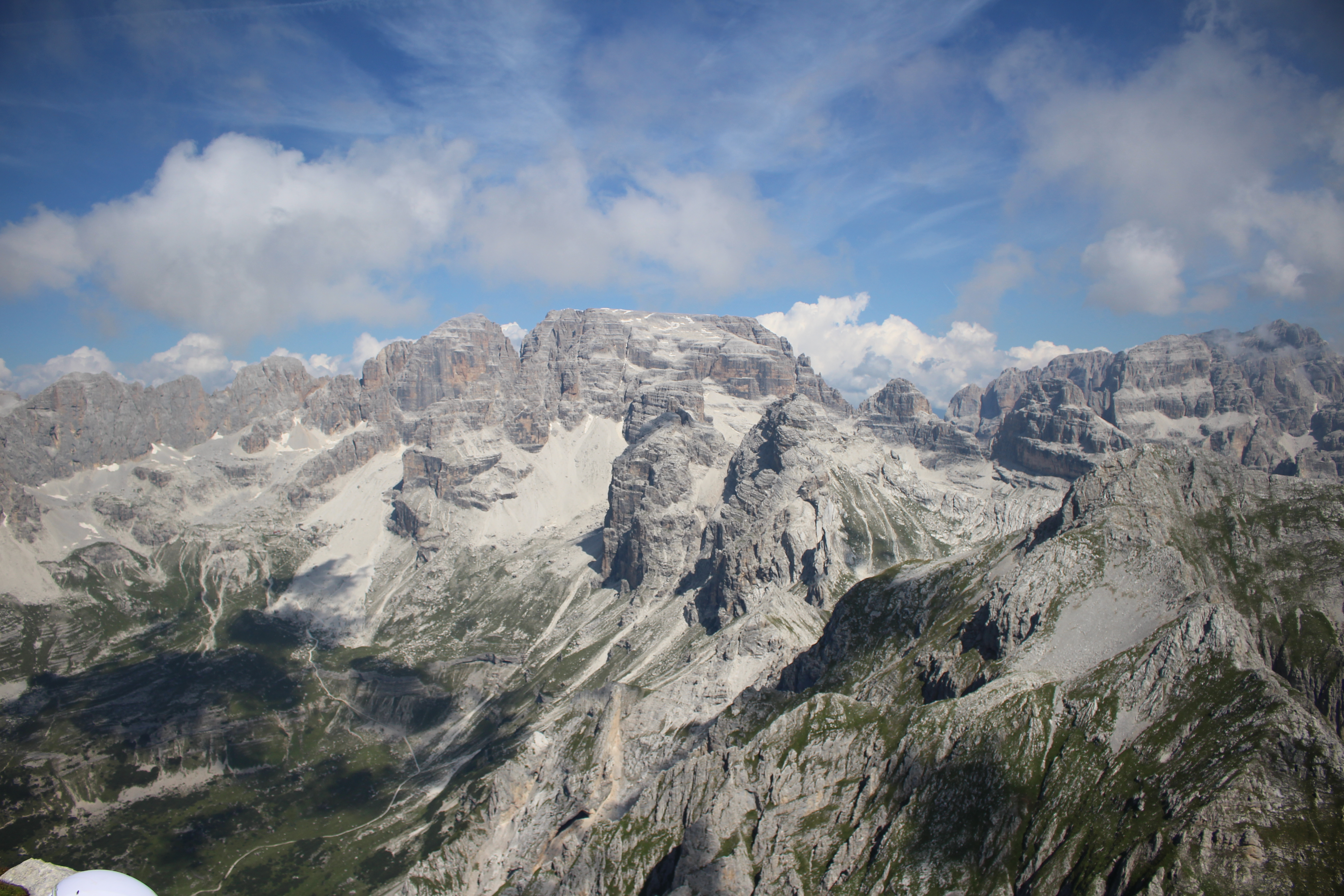
Ambiez Peak Massif - Tosa Peak seen from Ghez Peak

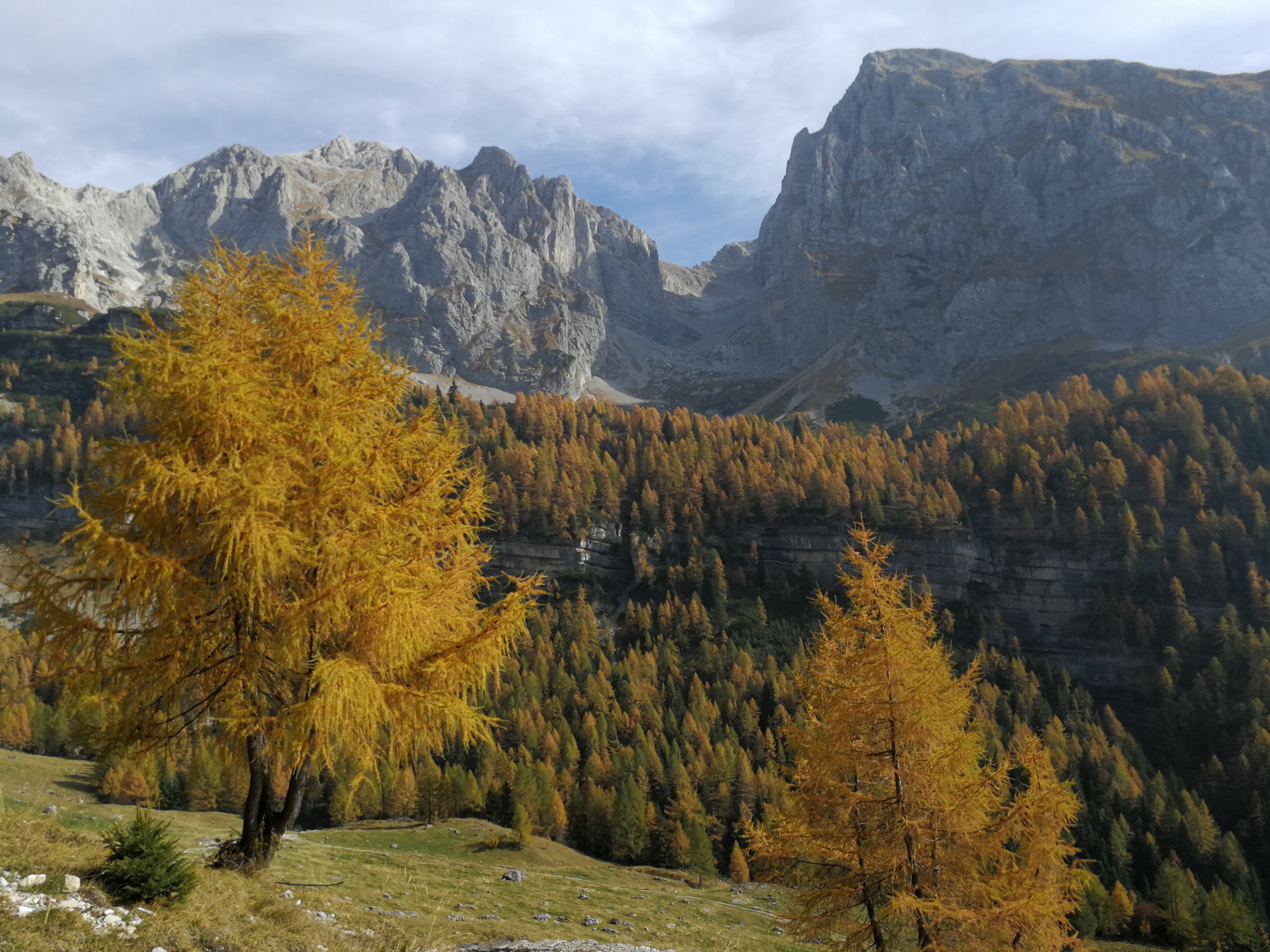
Ghez Peak and Doss di Dalun in autumn

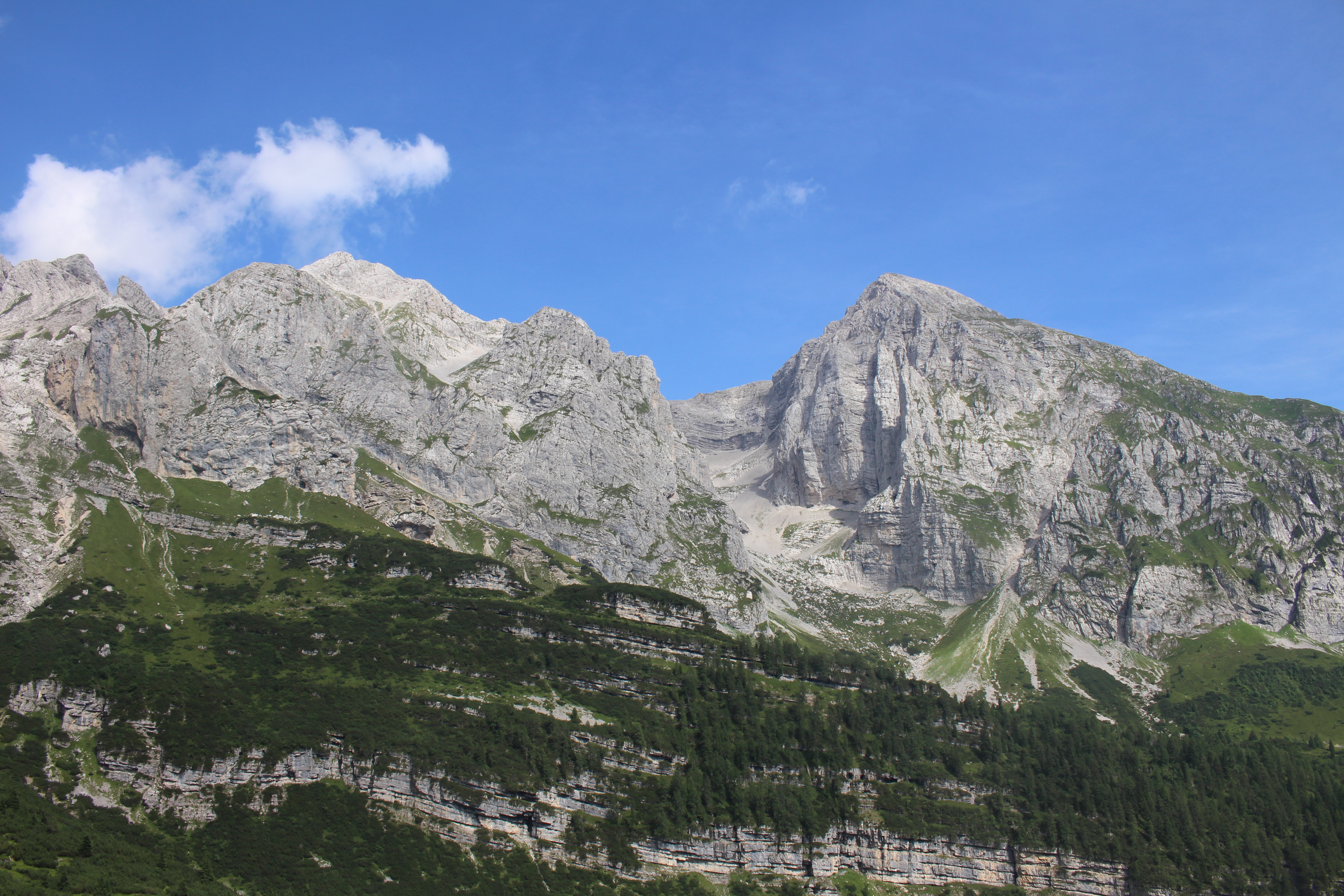
Dalun and Ghez (right) from the Upper Ambiez Valley

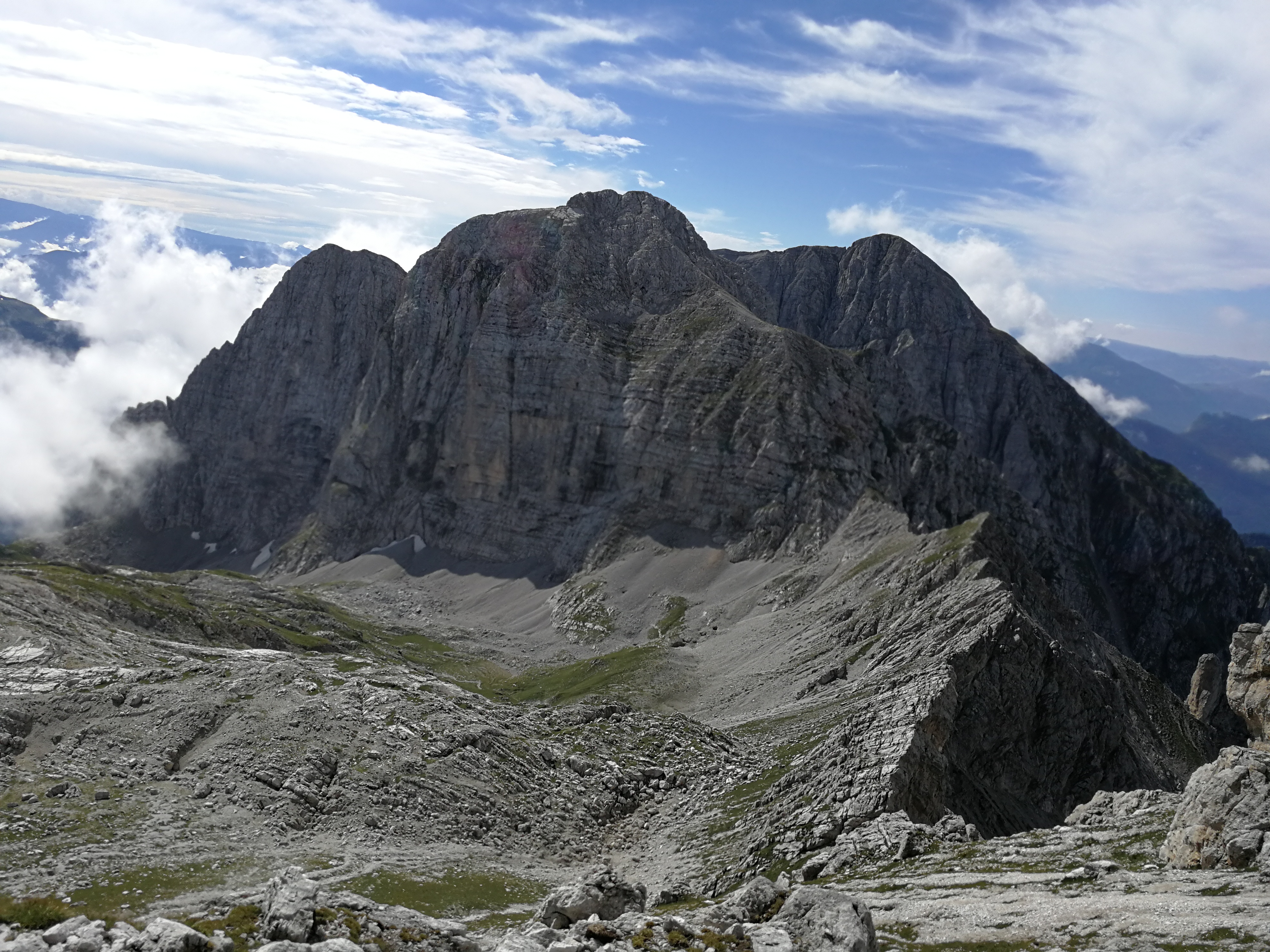
Dalun and Ghez (right) from Ceda Peak

== Bibliography ==
- Buscaini, Gino; Castiglioni, Ettore (1977). Dolomiti di Brenta, in Guida dei Monti d'Italia, San Donato Milanese [Brenta Dolomites, in Guide to the Mountains of Italy, San Donato Milanese] (in Italian). Club Alpino Italiano - Touring Club Italiano. ISBN 9788836500703.
- Marazzi, Sergio (2005). Atlante orografico delle Alpi. SOIUSA. Suddivisione orografica internazionale unificata del Sistema Alpino, in Quaderni di cultura alpina [Orographic atlas of the Alps. SOIUSA. Unified international orographic subdivision of the Alpine System, in Quaderni di cultura alpina] (in Italian). Pavone Canavese, Priuli & Verlucca. ISBN 9788880682738.
- Bernardi, Alberto; Ciri, Roberto; Muffato, Milo (2017). Vie normali nelle Dolomiti di Brenta, in Vie normali, Villa di Teolo [Normal routes in the Brenta Dolomites, in Normal Routes, Villa di Teolo] (in Italian). Idea Montagna Editore SNC. ISBN 9788885468184.
