= Cima Tosa =

Mountain in Italy

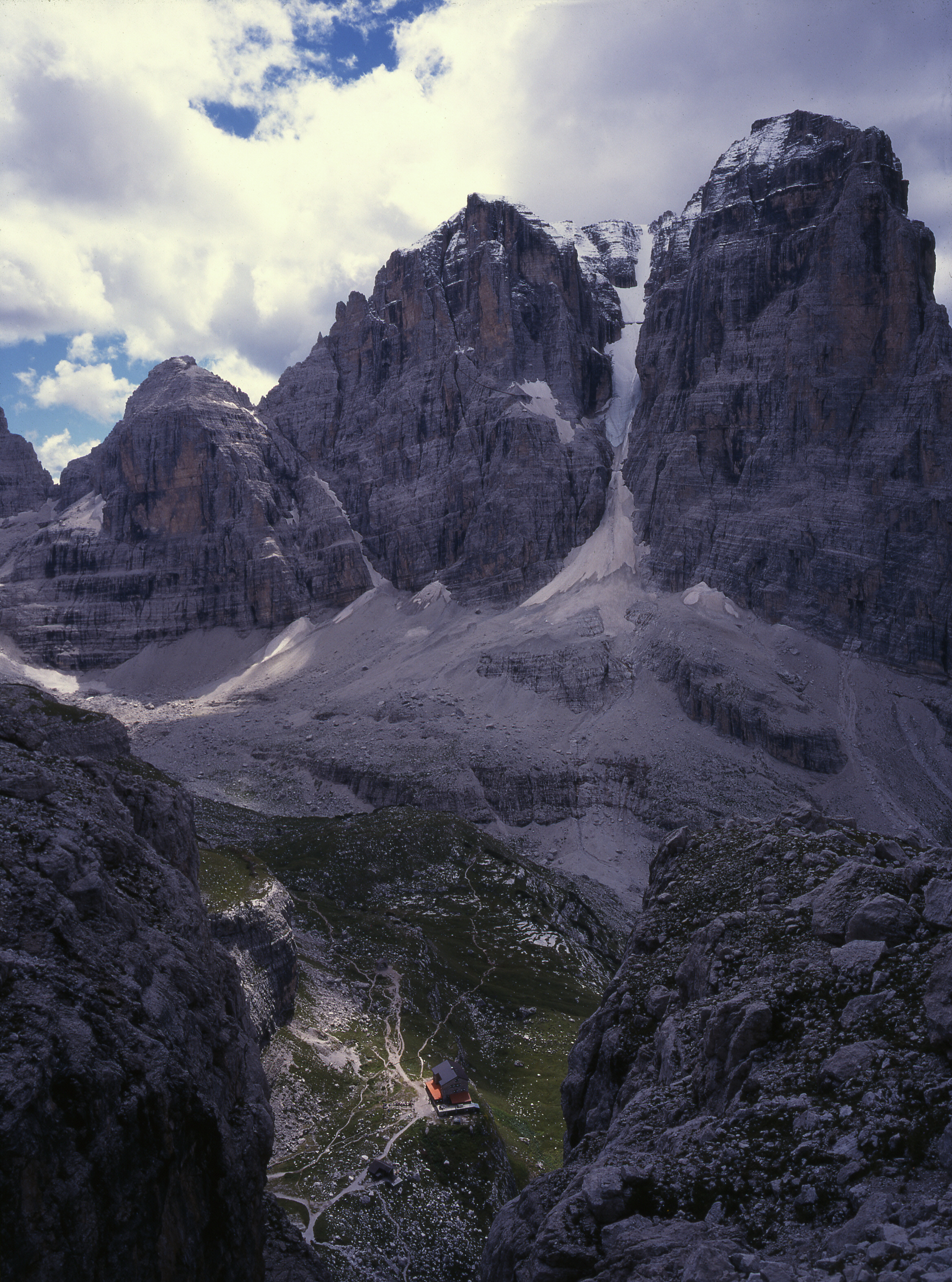
- Cima Tosa and Crozzon di Brenta

Highest point
- Elevation: 3,136 m (10,289 ft)
- Prominence: 589 m (1,932 ft)
- Listing: Alpine mountains above 3000 m
- Coordinates: 46°09′20″N 10°52′19″E

Geography
- Location within Alps
- Location: Trentino-Alto Adige/Südtirol, Italy
- Parent range: Brenta group, Rhaetian Alps

Climbing
- First ascent: 18-07-1865
- Easiest route: Via Normale from east

Cima Tosa is a mountain in the Brenta group (It.: Dolomiti di Brenta), a subgroup of the Rhaetian Alps in the Italian Region of Trentino-Alto Adige, with a reported height of 3,136 metres (10,289 ft). it is the second highest peak of the Brenta group in the southern limestone Alps after the Cima Brenta.

The height of the summit marked on the IGM maps is 3,173 m, which would make it the highest peak in the Brenta Dolomites. An electronic measurement campaign in 2015 determined the new height. The change could be linked to the partial melting of the ice cap that covers it. Being the second highest peak of the Brenta group also changed Cima Tosa's prominence making its prominence 589 m above the Bocca di Brenta.

The mountain rises above Val Rendena with its 800-metre (2,600 ft) vertical north face with a steep couloir called Canalone della Tosa dividing it from its ante-peak, Crozzon di Brenta. The summit is topped by a snow cupola above the rock face, almost like a shaven head, hence the name Cima Tosa (Iocal dialect: Shaven Summit). The south-eastern side descends in a series of snowy terraces and vertical rock pillars.

== Climbing history ==
The first men to undertake the ascent were Giuseppe Loss, a botanist and alpinism pioneer from Primiero, together with six companions. On July 18, 1865 they departed from San Lorenzo in Banale, advanced through Val d'Ambiez and having passed over the Forcolotta di Noghera approached the mountain over the vedretta d'Ambiez through the south-east slope along the trajectory that constitutes what is now known as the 'Via Normale'. Cima Tosa turned out to be accessible only by climbing through a 25-metre drop vertical rock face. They decided to climb through a wet chimney, 'il camino della Tosa' (UIAA: II), though one of the companions thought it better to stay behind. Finally, they reached the top, and by doing so, they preceded an undertaking of the founder of the Alpine Club (UK), John Ball, by just four days. John Ball's account of his ascent in the 'Alpine Journal' brought the mountain into the alpinists' limelight. Loss' and Ball's itinerary would remain the only way for a number of years, while several attempts were made to reach the three consecutive summits of Crozzon di Brenta passing over the ridge between the two mountains.

A new itinerary to the summit of Cima Tosa from the south was found in 1886 by A. Migotti (Via Migotti, I/II). The local guides, notably the Nicolussi brothers from Molveno and Antonio Dallagiacomo from Madonna di Campiglio, accompanied most of the early explorers and daring wealthy tourists to the summit of this mountain and beyond to the summits of Crozzon. The guide Enrico Giordano from Molveno accompanied the Italian novelist and poet Antonio Fogazzaro to the summit of Cima Tosa in 1890. Fogazzaro expressed his impressions on the mountain in the poem "Il Pianto della Tosa". Carlo Garbari and Nino Pooli traced a new route through the eastern rock face in 1890 (200m: II).

In 1911, Giovanni Battista 'Tita' Piaz(in German) (il diavolo delle Dolomiti) and Michelson climbed through the majestic north-east face for the first time. Daredevil Piaz initially considered his 'Via Piaz' (IV+/V) itinerary too risky to be attempted again. But it would be repeated by Virgilio Neri, the same man that solo-climbed in 1929 the 'Canalone della Tosa', the glaciered couloir that descends almost vertical from the top of Cima Tosa through the north face (the classic ice-climb of the Dolomites). Neri repeated the Via Piaz in 1930 together with Mario Agostini. During the next decades, further classical climbing routes were opened:

- Via Diretta (E wall) – 750 m – IV/V (1933, Bruno Detassis, Ettore Castiglione);
- Via Barbier (NE wall) – 750 m – IV+ (1965);
- Via Flli. Detassis (NE wall) – 700 m – V (1962);
- Via Città di Brescia (SW wall) – 350 m – V/VI (1962, Armando Aste, Franco Solina); and
- Via Maestri (E wall) – 350 m – IV (1975).

Many other interesting climbing itineraries and variants are available on all sides of this mountain. The classic routes of Crozzon di Brenta, essentially a pre-summit of Cima Tosa, are available at very short distance.

=== Views ===
Lake Garda is brightly visible on a clear day. Towards the north, the summits and pinnacles of the central Brenta Group are all looked upon from above. Westwards a complete view of the Adamello and Presanella, while right under the snow field disappears into the Canalone della Tosa. This couloir was descended on skis the first time in 1970 by Heini Holzer and A. Tscholl and has become a classic for those engaged in extreme skiing.
