= Lake Molveno =

Lake in Trentino, Italy

- Lago di Molveno (Italian)
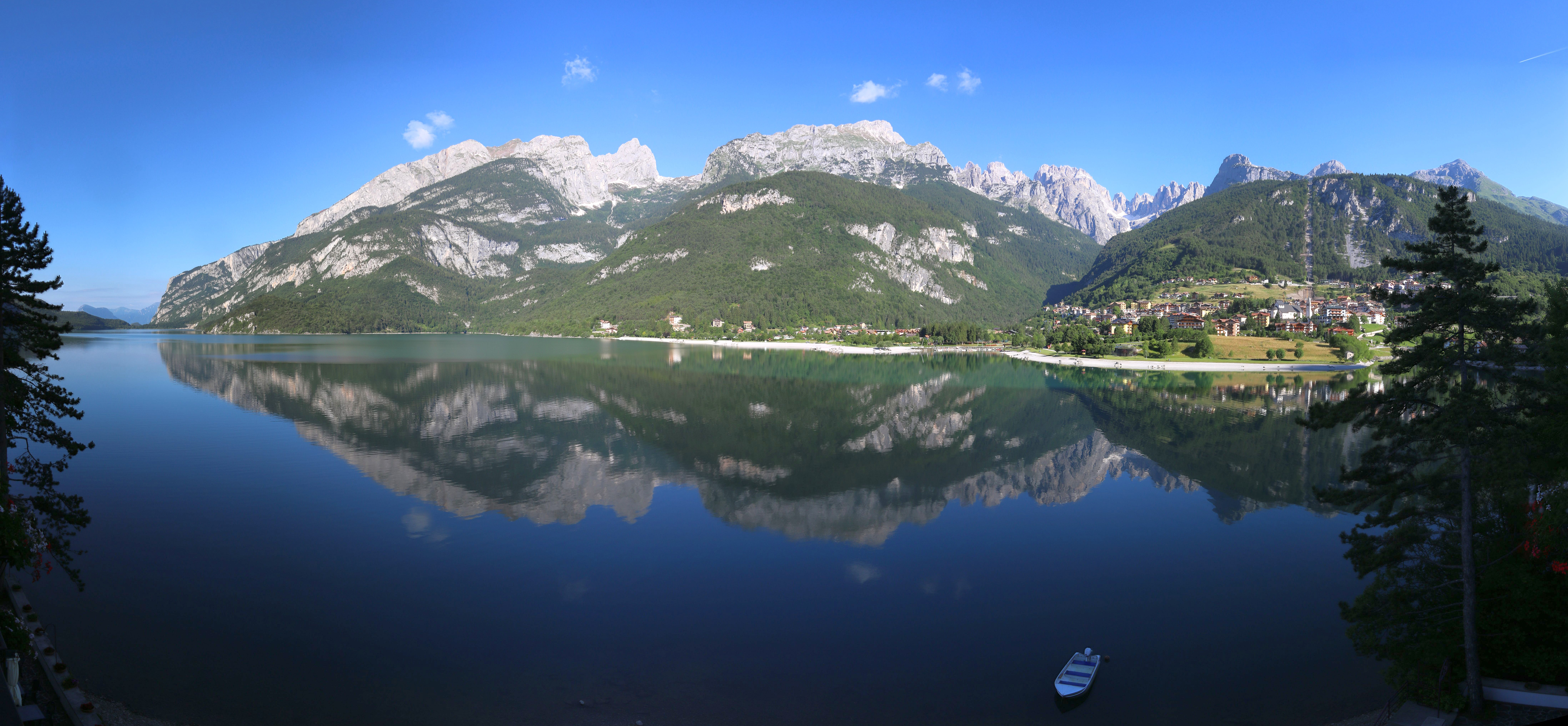

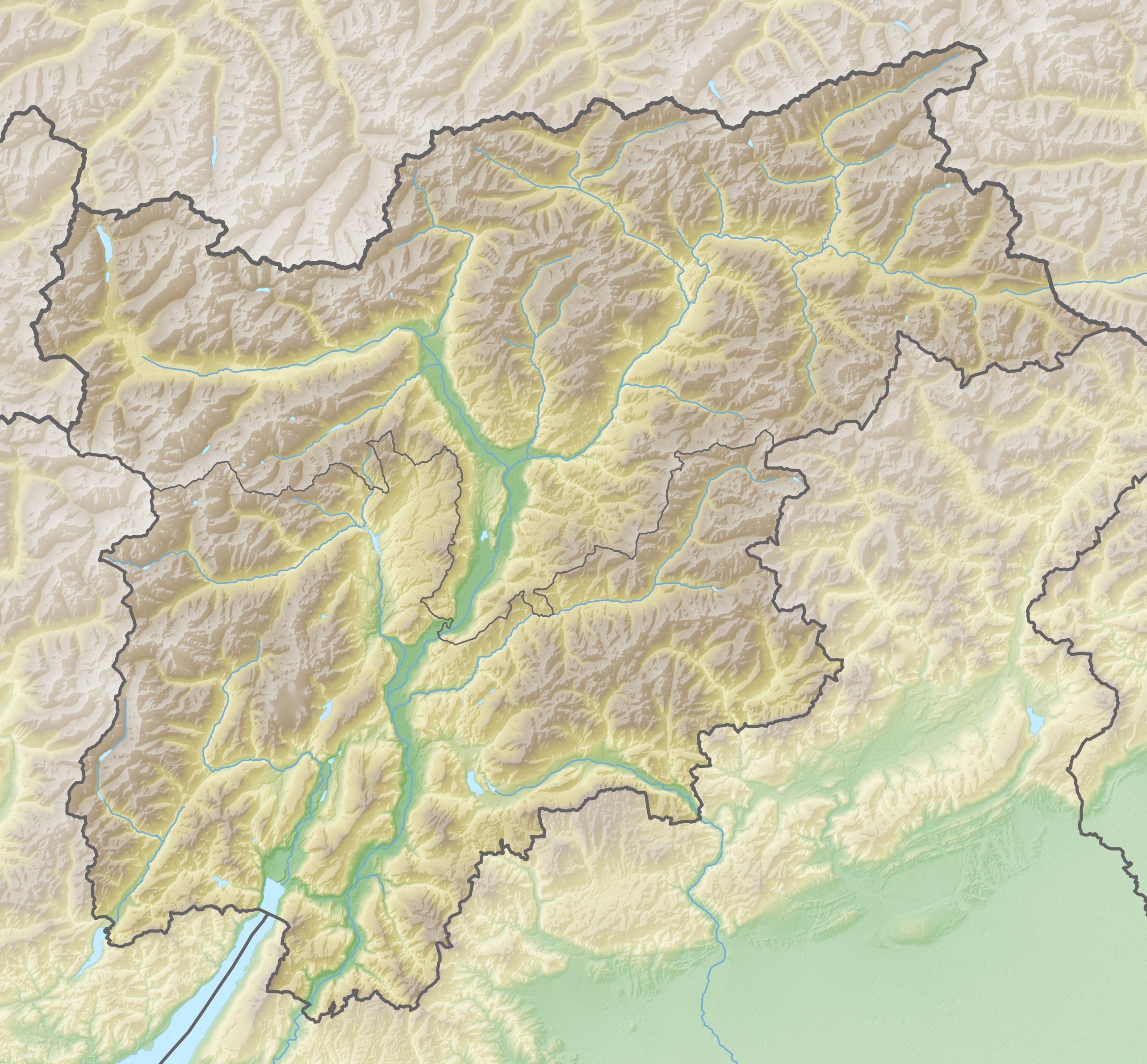
- Location within Trentino-Alto Adige/Südtirol
- Location: Trentino
- Coordinates: 46°07′32″N 10°57′40″E
- Primary inflows: Rio di Lambin
- Basin countries: Italy
- Max. length: c. 4 km (2.5 mi)
- Max. depth: 120 m (390 ft)
- Surface elevation: 864 m (2,835 ft)
- Settlements: Molveno

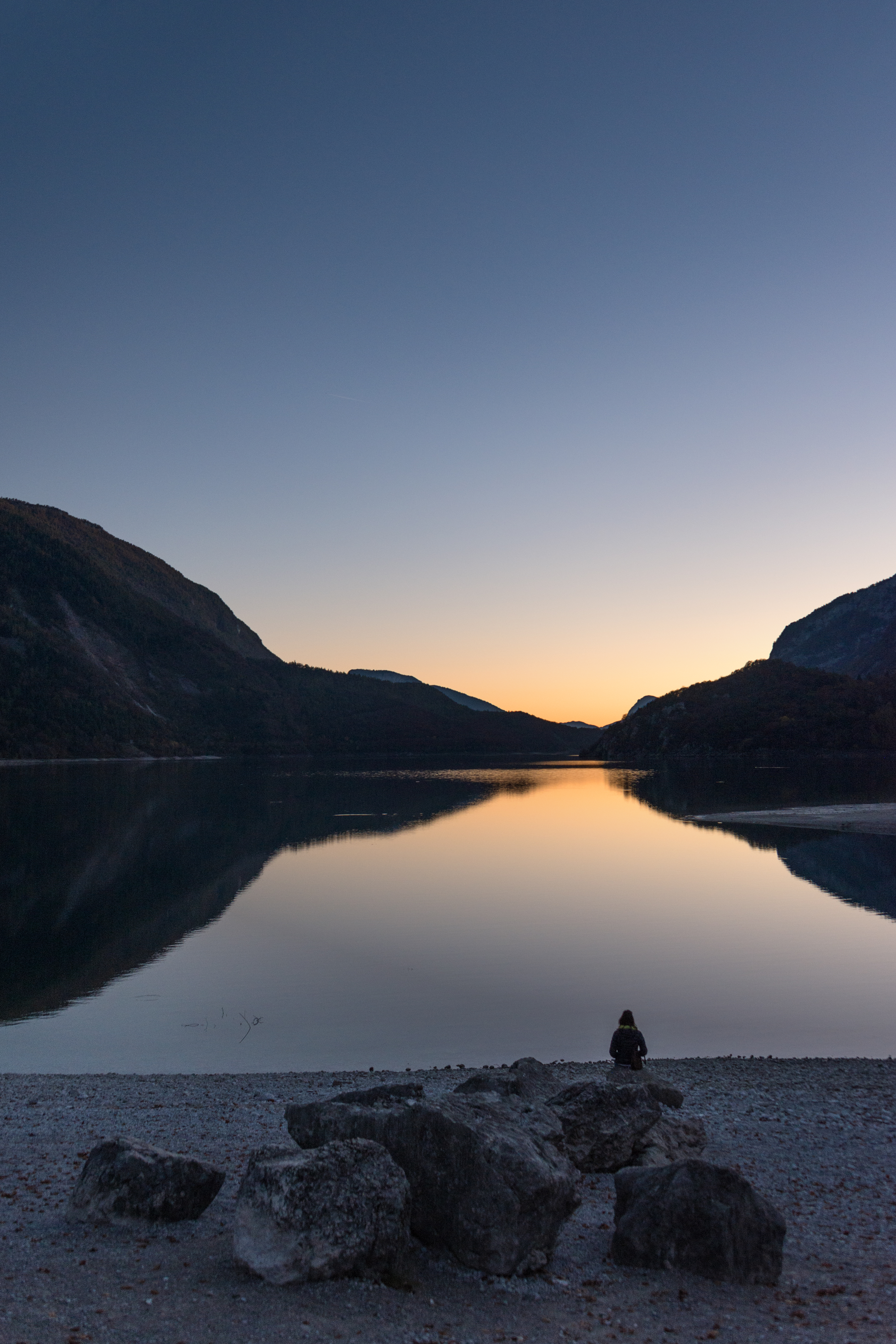
The Lake at twilight

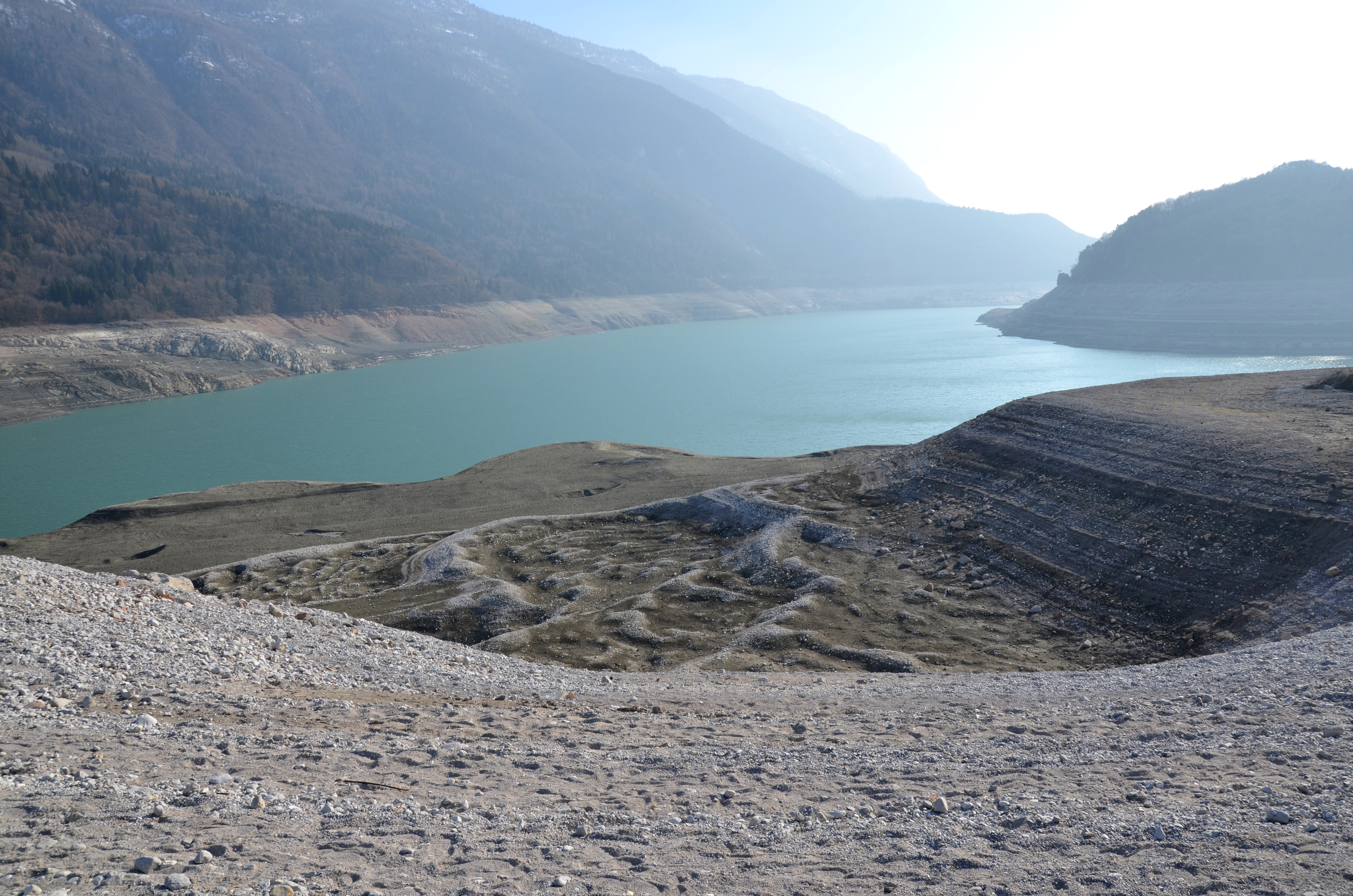
Emptied Molveno's lake, February 2017

Lake Molveno (German: Malfeinsee) is a lake in Trentino, Italy. The only settlement is Molveno, located at the north end of the basin.

The lake marks the boundary between the Group of the Brenta Dolomites (Campanile Basso, Croz dell'Altissimo, Sfulmini, Cima Tosa) to the west and the Paganella - Mount Gazza to the south east).

In 1952, the lake was drained to allow the construction of collectors and conduits to feed the power plant of S. Massenza. On this occasion a petrified forest submerged at the time of the lake's formation was found on the bed of the lake. The analysis with radiocarbon carried out in the laboratory of nuclear geology of the University of Pisa has established that the formation of Lake Molveno dates back to the early Iron Age. (about 3000 years ago).

== See also ==
- List of lakes of Italy
