= Brenta group =

Alpine mountain range in northeastern Italy

Brenta Group
- Italian: Dolomiti di Brenta
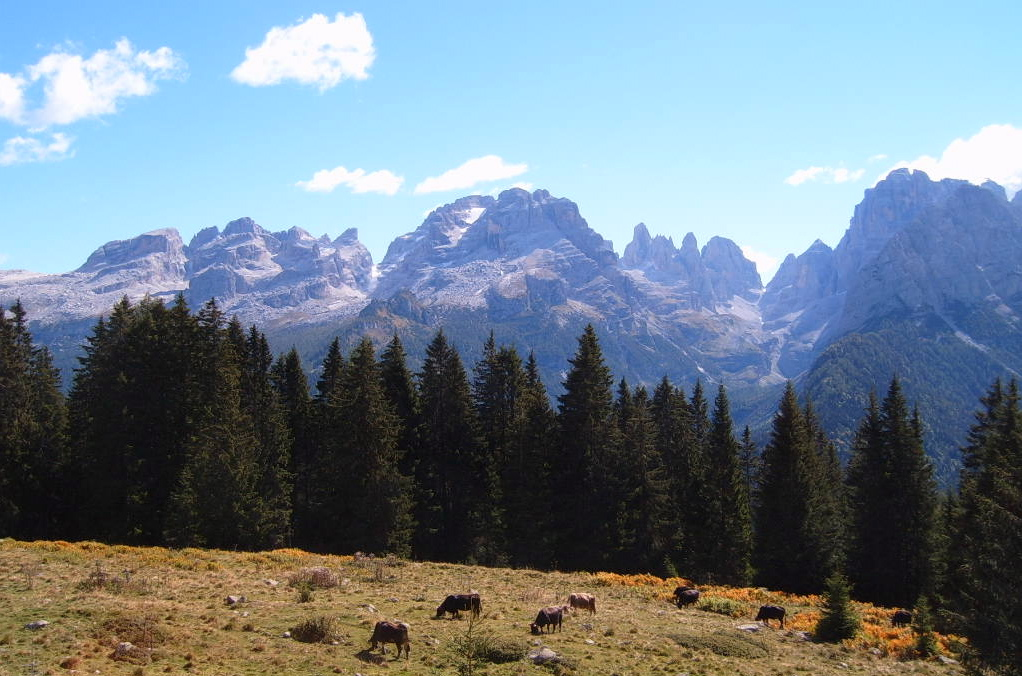
- Brenta Group mountain range.

Highest point
- Peak: Cima Tosa (disputed)
- Elevation: 3,173 m (10,410 ft)
- Coordinates: 46°9′26″N 10°52′16″E

Geography
- Location within Alps
- Location: Trentino, Italy
- Parent range: Rhaetian Alps, Southern Limestone Alps

The Brenta Group or Brenta Dolomites (Italian: Dolomiti di Brenta) is a mountain range, and a subrange of the Rhaetian Alps in the Southern Limestone Alps mountain group. They are located in the Province of Trentino, in northeastern Italy. It is the only dolomitic group west of the Adige River. Therefore, geographically, they have not always been considered a part of the Dolomites mountain ranges. Geologically, however, they definitely are - and therefore sometimes called the "Western Dolomites". As part of the Dolomites, the Brenta Group has been officially recognized as UNESCO World Heritage Site under the World Heritage Convention.

UNESCO World Heritage Site

== Geology and glaciology ==
Geologically, the Brenta Group is very different from the granite-formed neighboring mountain groups like Ortles and Adamello/Presanella. The main peaks are formed of hard compact dolomite, while the peripheral subgroups often are made up of more calcareous dolomite or limestone. The hard dolomite (dolomia principale) was originally formed during the Mesozoic era, under the surface of the shallow Tethys Ocean, some 200 million years ago. The hard compact dolomite with a high magnesium content was formed during the Upper Triassic period. The softer, more calcareous material was deposited later, in the late Triassic and early Jurassic period. The difference is clearly noticeable for the climber who gets a much more compact and reliable rock on the peaks of the central part of the Brenta Group than in the peripheral subgroups. Eventually, these layers were pushed upwards by the tectonic activity that led to the formation of the Alps during the Eocene, starting some 66 million years ago and leading to the formation of folds and thrust faults. Subsequent erosion carved out the dolomitic landscape with its steep vertical pinnacles, as we know it now. Although the remnants of huge moraines suggests that the Brenta group was once encapsulated by big glaciers, the remnants of those are now very modest and have been steadily shrinking over the course of the last hundred years. Traditionally, the Brenta glaciers were relatively small and called "vedrette". Over the last hundred years their size has been reduced to often smaller than half of their original size around 1900. Climate change appears to be the main reason.

== Geography ==
The Brenta Group is separated from:

1. the Ortler Alps in the north by the Noce Valley
2. the Adamello-Presanella group in the west by the Campo Carlo Magno Pass and the river Sarca
3. the Fiemme Mountains in the east by the Adige valley.

The Brenta Group covers a relatively large area. It can be subdivided into a

1. Southern Sector, comprising the Tosa massif, the Ambiez chain and the subgroups of Vallon, Fracingli, Ghez;
2. Central Sector, comprising the Sfulmini chain and the Cima Brenta massif as well as the subgroups of Monte Daino, Gaiarda/Altissimo and Grostè.
3. Northern Sector comprising the Northern chain and the subgroup of La Campa.

Technically, the shouldering mountains, as there are on the east side Cima Paganella, Monte Gazza, and on the west side the Doss del Sabion should be considered part of the Brenta Group, but they are very peripheral. The Brenta Group counts a number of lakes of which the Molveno Lake and the Tovèl Lake are the most significant.

== Peaks ==
Campanile Basso

Notable peaks of the Brenta Group are:

| Peak | Elevation (m/ft) | |
|---|---|---|
| Cima Tosa | 3173 | 10,410 |
| Cima Brenta | 3155 | 10,352 |
| Crozzon di Brenta | 3123 | 10,247 |
| Pietra Grande | 2935 | 9630 |
| Campanile Basso | 2883 | 9459 |
| Croz dell'Altissimo | 2339 | 7674 |

Recent research has suggested that Cima Tosa is not as high as 3173 metres and is probably lower than Cima Brenta.

== Mountain passes ==
The main mountain passes of the Brenta Group are:

| Pass | Location | Type | Elevation (m/ft) | |
|---|---|---|---|---|
| Bocca di Tuckett | Madonna di Campiglio to Molveno | snow | 2656 | 8714 |
| Bocca di Brenta | Pinzolo to Molveno | snow | 2553 | 8376 |
| Passo del Grostè | M.di Campiglio to Cles | footpath | 2440 | 8006 |

== Exploration history ==
The Brenta Group had probably been frequently explored by local hunters, but the scientific and alpinistic exploration started in 1864 when John Ball, (Irish-)British explorer and founder of the British Alpine Club, undertook the east–west traverse of the Brenta Group over the Bocca di Brenta. A year later he reached the summit of the Cima Tosa, only to find out that a few days earlier, on July 20, 1865, the summit had been claimed by Bepi Loss from Primiero and his companions. Ball wrote about his endeavors in the Alpine Journal and attracted other British explorers to the Brenta Group. Douglas Freshfield, a later chairman of the prestigious Alpine Club arrived in 1871. He and his companions Francis Fox Tuckett and the French guide François Devouassoud from Chamonix. These men, who all would become main figures of the Golden Age of Alpinism were active in the Brenta Group and Presanella in 1871 and 1872. In 1871 they reached the summit of the Cima Brenta. Other British mountaineers of that era that would add to the exploration of the Brenta Group were Arthur John Butler (a.o. 1884: Cima degli Armi, 1885: Campanile Alto), Albert de Falkner and Edward Theodore Compton (1881: Crozzon di Brenta). The latter built up a career as an artist in Germany and had fully integrated into the ranks of the Deutsch-Oestereichische Alpen Verein (DÖAV), for which he made a large series of paintings and illustrations, also featuring the Brenta Group in some remarkable images. Trentino was 'Welshtirol', part of the Austro-Hungarian Empire until 1918, so it was only natural that the DÖAV took an interest in the exploration of these mountains. After Karl Schulz had reached the third and highest summit of the Crozzon di Brenta and reported his findings, other German and Austrian alpinist found their way to the Brenta Group.

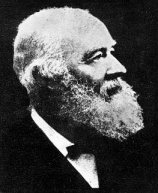
John Ball (1818-1889)

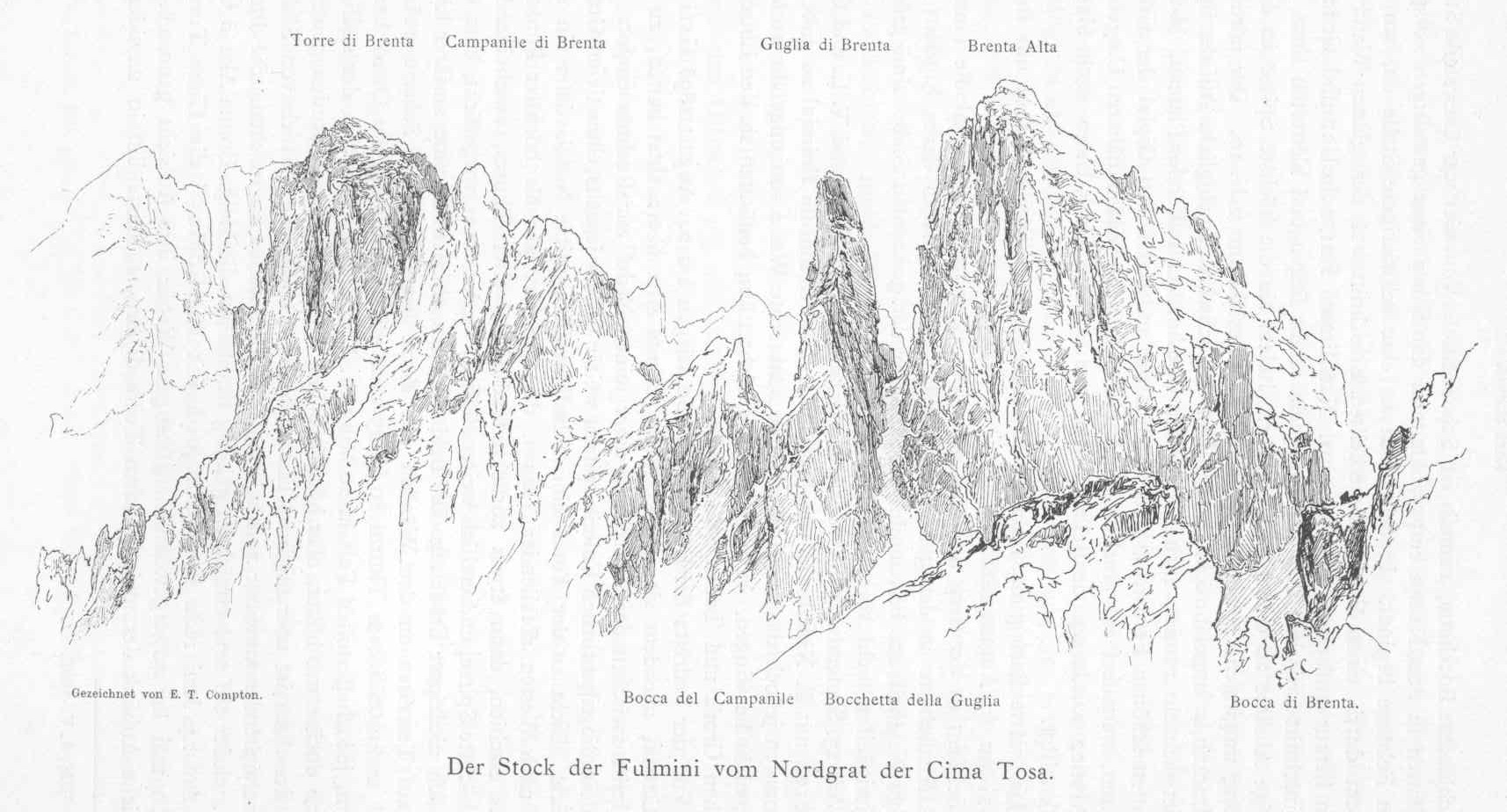
E.T. Compton: Torre di Brenta

Crozzon di Brenta, Vedretta dei Camosci, Early '20s

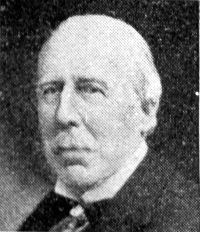
Douglas Freshfield (1845-1934)

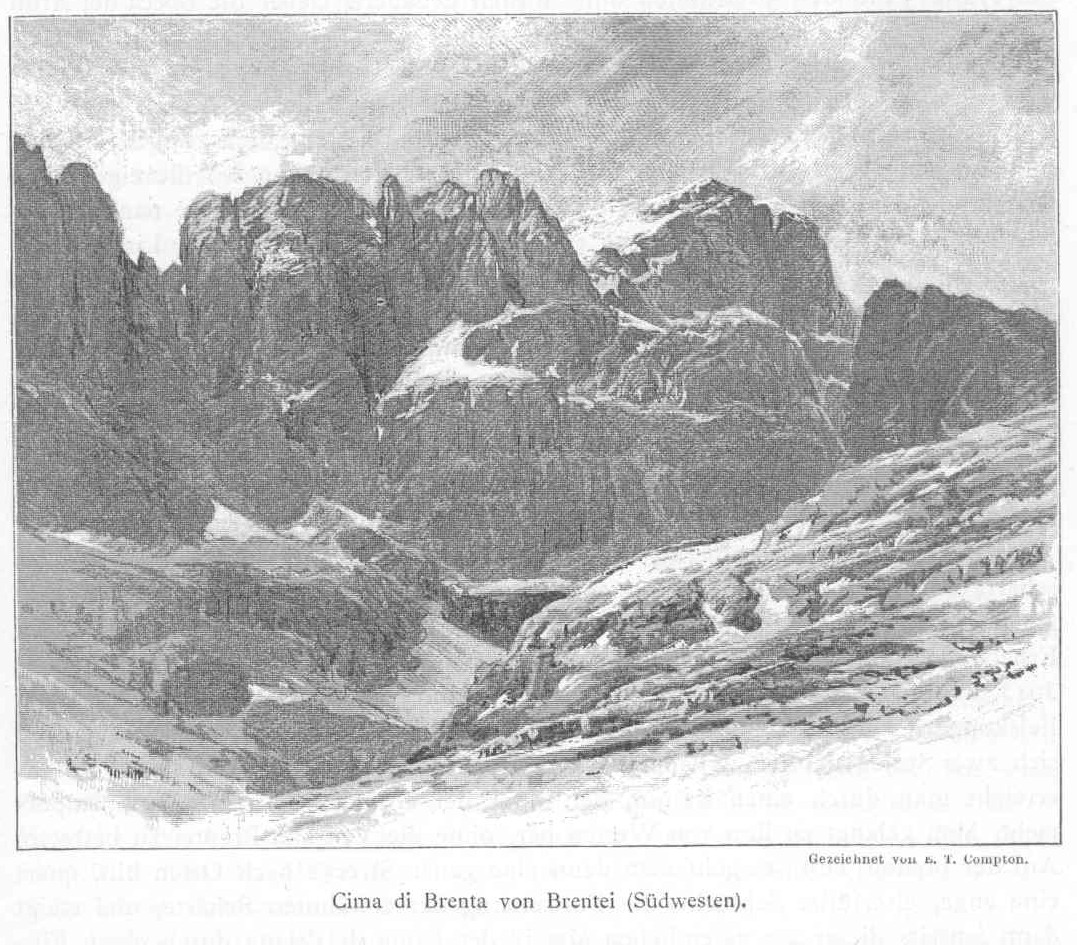
E.T. Compton: Cima Brenta

Rif. Tosa, August 3, 1925

Important explorative and descriptive work was done by Alfred von Radio-Radiis and Hanns Barth. German speaking alpinists like Gottfried Merzbacher, Steck, Mayr, Adang, Heinemann and others left their mark on the Brenta Dolomites. Around the turn of the century a competitive spirit developed between Italian and German speaking alpinists, which took its main inspiration from the emerging nationalistic feelings in the region. Besides that, the explorative character of alpinism gave way to the ascent of rock climbing as a sport. The completion of the Italian unification in 1870 triggered expectations in Italian speaking Tyrol. The spirit of Irredentismo was increasingly present among the local alpinists, who had founded in 1872 their own Società degli Alpinisti Tridentini. In 1882 they constructed the first mountain hut located within the Brenta Group, close to Bocca di Brenta: Rifugio Tosa, at 2,439 m (8,002 ft). Local Alpinists like Carlo and Giuseppe Garbari and Nino Pooli, started to follow in the tracks of the local guides Matteo & Bonifacio Nicolussi and Antonio Dallagiacomo, who had led all the foreigners to the summits. The antagonism with the Germanic climbers was exacerbated by an alleged practice of piggybacking on Italic efforts. The DÖAV Sektion Bremen decided to construct a large mountain hut at the rocky saddle just above the Rifugio Tosa in 1897. A similar situation was created at Passo Tuckett where the SAT had constructed the small rifugio Sella in 1905 and the DÖAV Sektion Berlin built a larger hut right next to it. When the last undisturbed major peak in the Brenta Group, Campanile Basso, was finally climbed by Berger and Ampferer in 1899, it appeared that they had heavily relied on the work of Garbari and Pooli, who had stopped just 35 m (115 ft) off the summit. During the First World War the Brenta Group remained undisturbed by warfare and it is fair to conclude that after Trentino became allocated to Italy at the Treaty of Saint-Germain-en-Laye, the exploration of the Brenta Group had been largely completed. The era of sports climbing had begun and innumerable climbing routes in all possible difficulty rates were traced on the vertical walls of these mountains over the years.

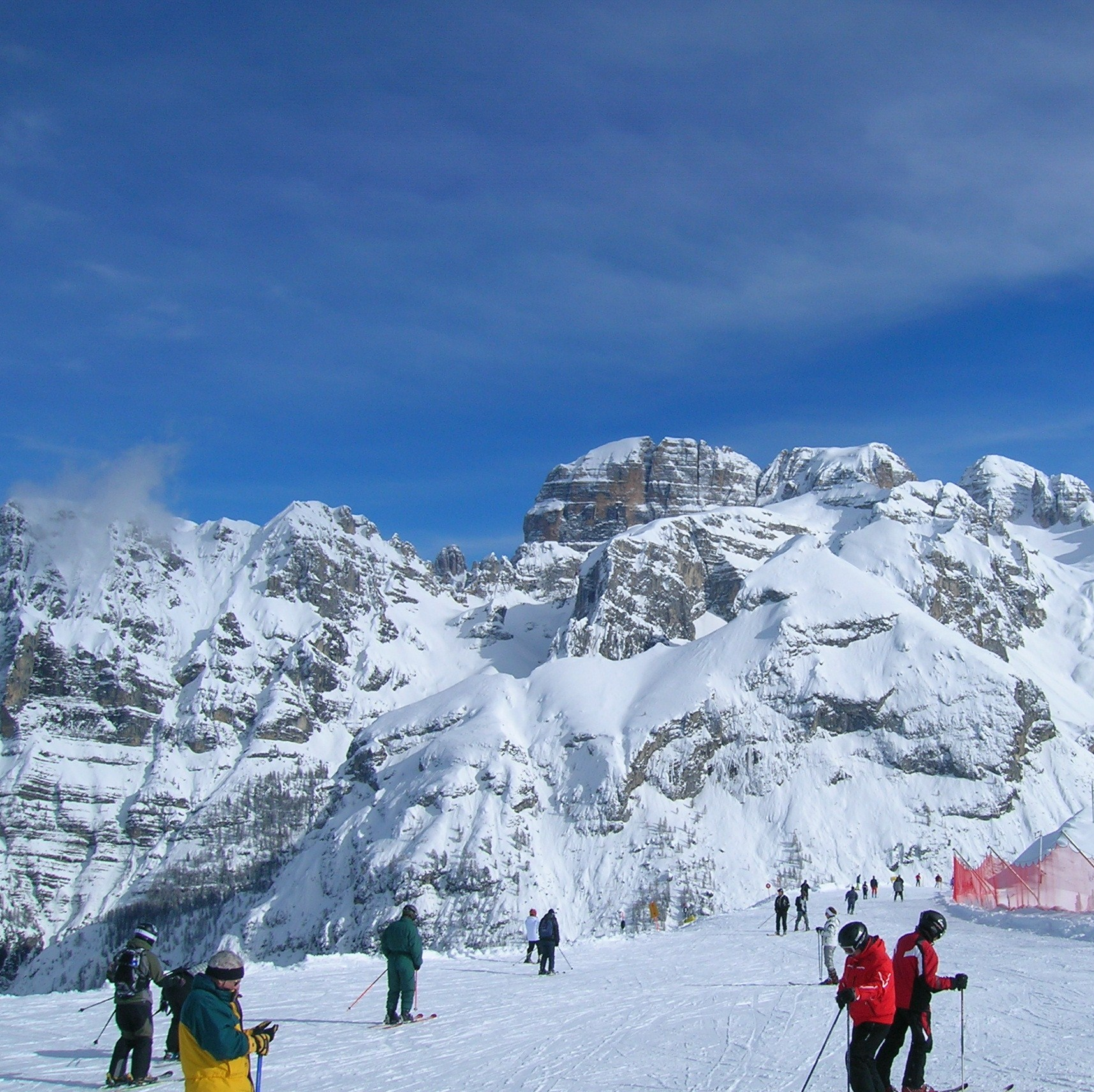
Brenta Group from Doss del Sabbion

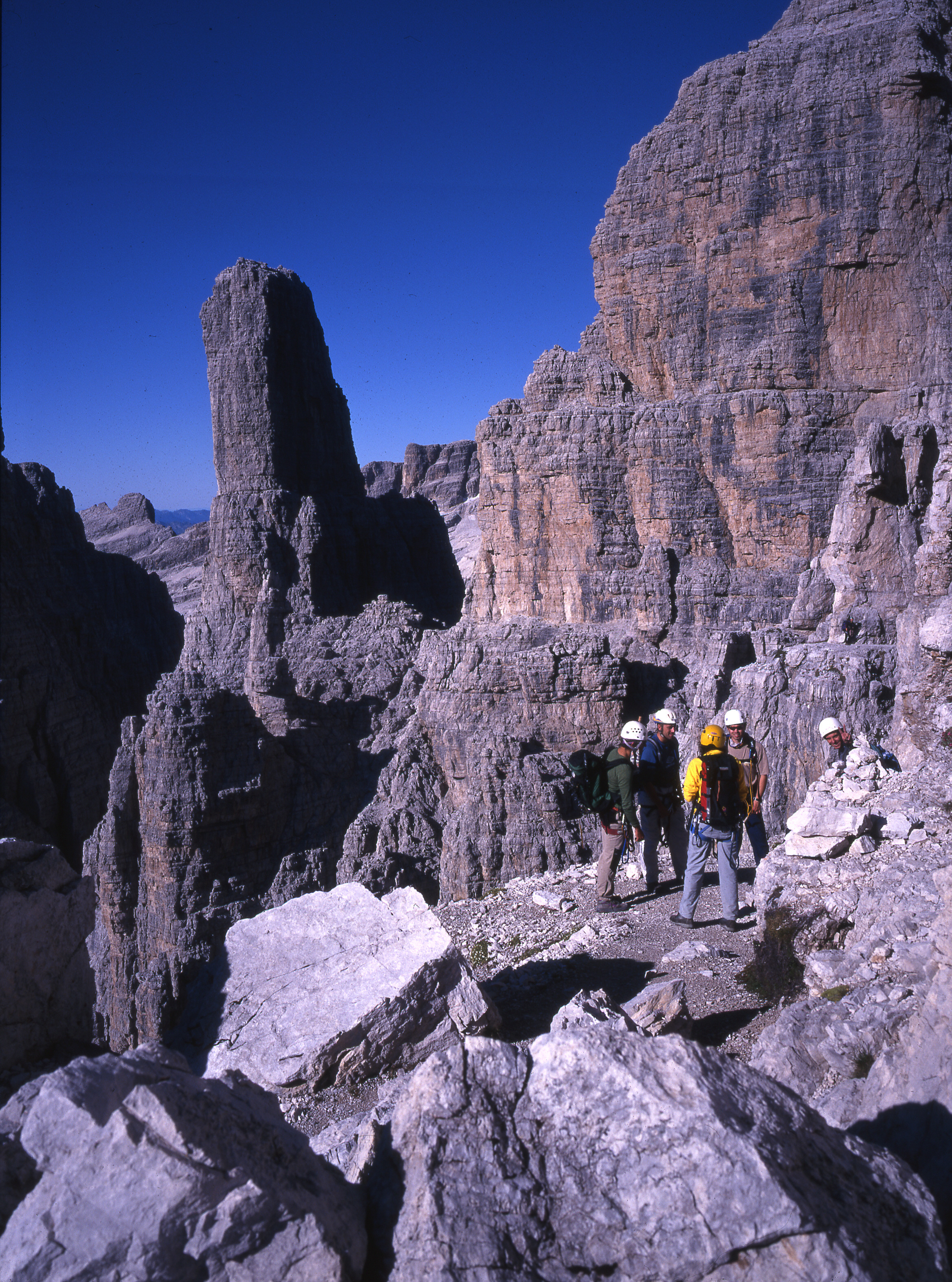
Bocchette Centrali

Bocchette Centrali, Campanile Basso apex

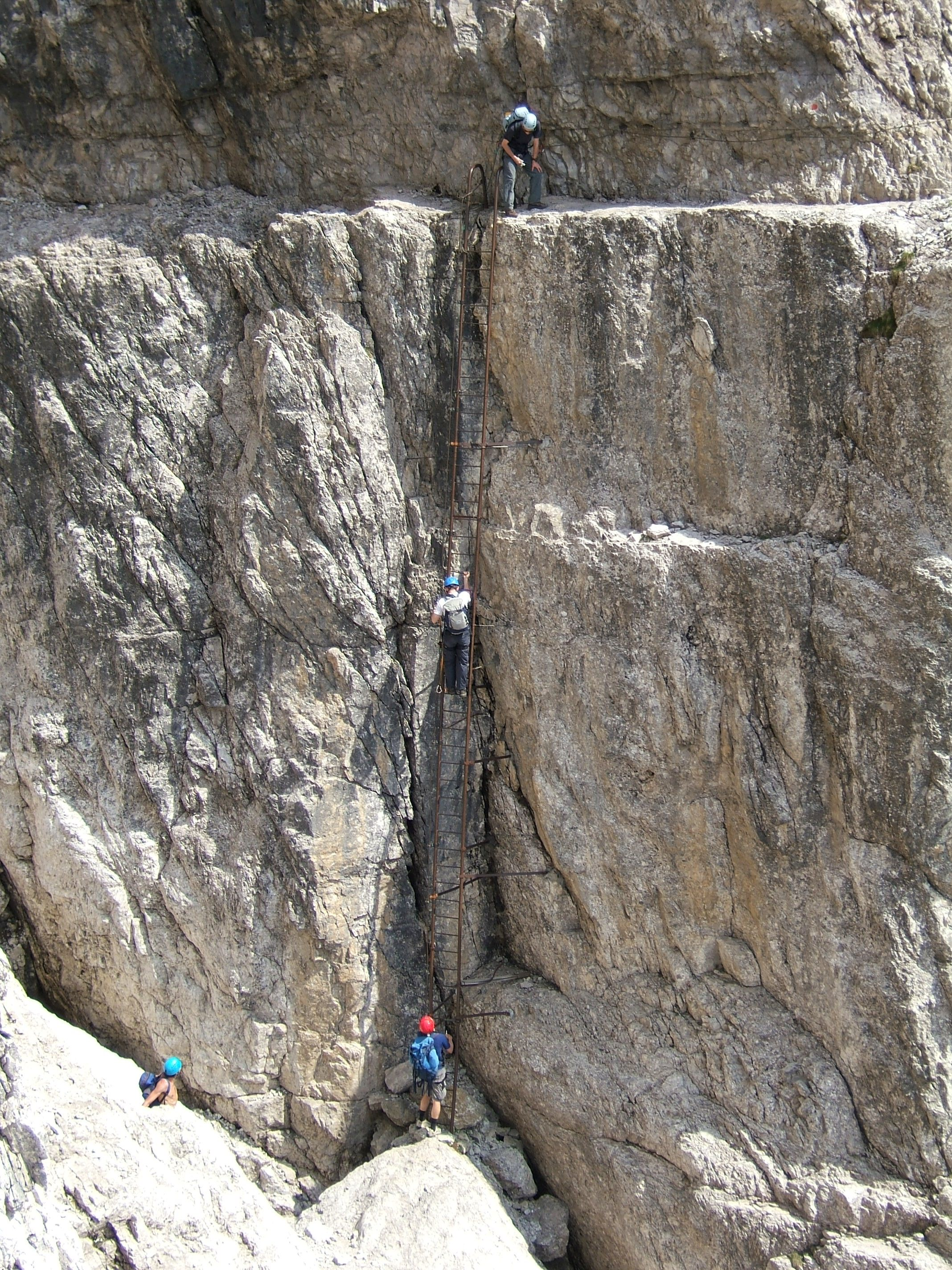
Bocchette Alte

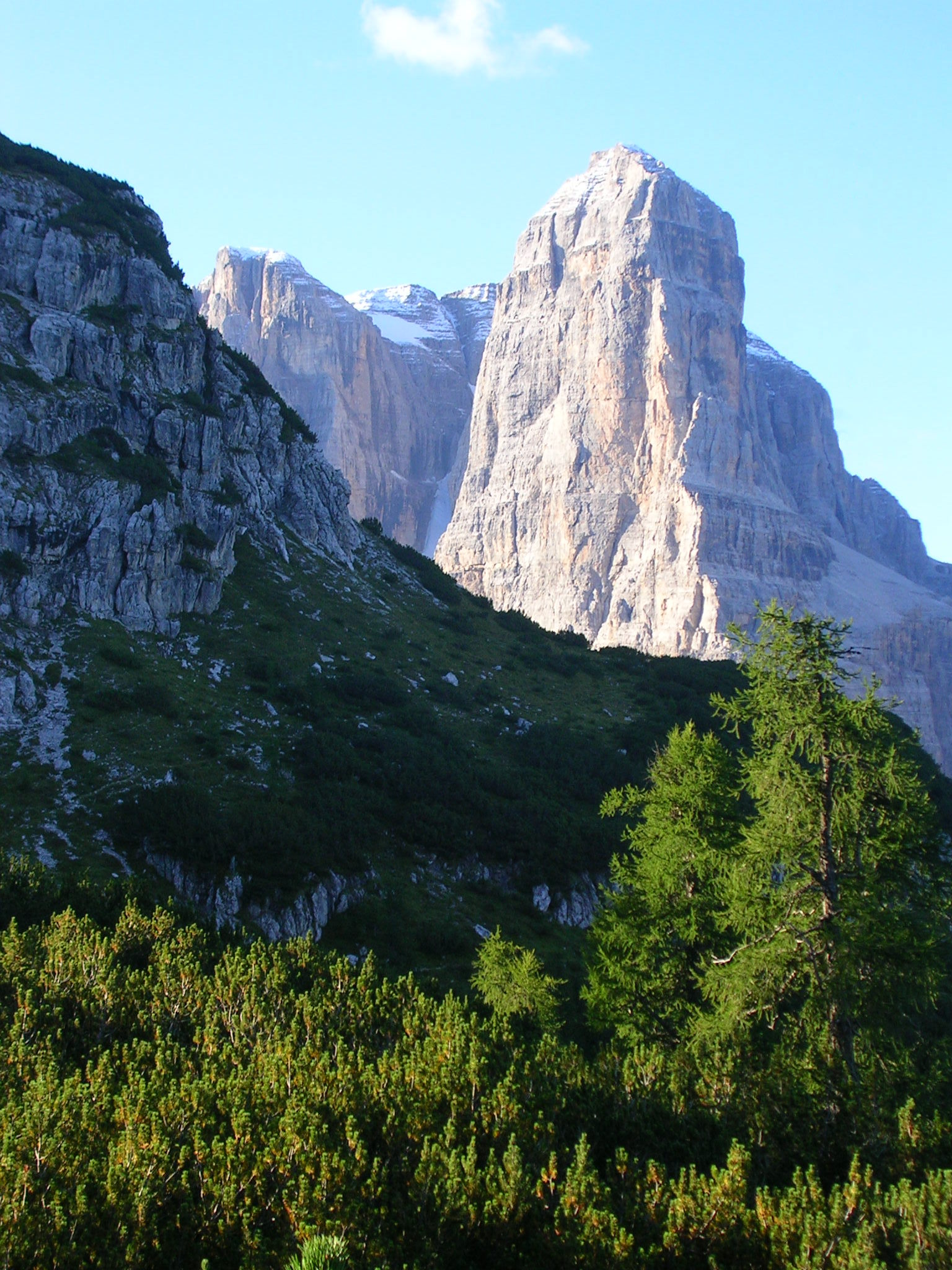
Crozzon di Brenta and Cima Tosa

== Via delle Bocchette ==
The access to the peaks and pinnacles of the central part of the Brenta Group was facilitated by the construction -by order of the SAT- of a via ferrata that would respectfully avoid the summits but would connect the passes and indentures called bocchette between the peaks. The work on the Via dell Bocchette Centrali started in 1935. Much of the work at that stage was done by the Brenta guides of that era: Bruno Detassis and Enrico Giordano. The itinerary completed two years later enabled climbers to reach the apex of the Campanile Basso Via Normale. The works were interrupted by the Second World War but were resumed in 1948 mostly by effort of Celestino Donini, until reaching its completion point at the Bocca dei Armi. Later, in 1968-'69 the itinerary was extended towards the Bocca del Tuckett by a trajectory called Via delle Bocchette Alte, a challenging itinerary that reaches a quota of 3,002 m (9,849 ft) and traverses the Cima Brenta east face just under the summit. At a later stage the itinerary of vie ferrate was extended towards Passo del Grostè by means of the Sentiero Benini and still later on extended further over the Northern Chain towards Rifugio Peller: Sentiero Costanzi.

== Flora and fauna ==
The Autonomous Province of Trento passed a law in 1967 to protect the Brenta Group as part of the Parco Naturale Adamello-Brenta. This area covers 650 km^{2} (250 mi^{2}). Its fauna is among the richest of the Alps and includes all animal species which find their habitat on the mountains; bear, chamois and alpine ibex included. The Brenta Group was one of the last places in Italy where endemic bears (Ursus arctos) could find a habitat. Their numbers have recently grown, also as a result of the strengthening of the population by mixing in bears from Slovenia. Approximately 30 bears populate the park. The golden eagle (Aquila chrysaetos) and the wood grouse (Tetrao urogallus) find a protected home in these mountains. At several locations there are colonies of alpine marmots (Marmota marmot).

== Skiing, hiking and climbing ==
The ski slopes are located on the west side of the Brenta Group in Val Rendena surrounding the ski resorts of Madonna di Campiglio and Pinzolo.

Most of the lifts and ski slopes are located on the shouldering mountains Doss del Sabion and Monte Spinale. There is however a long modern high capacity lift that goes from Madonna del Campiglio right up the main chain of the Brenta Group to Passo Grostè at 2,444 m (8,018 ft). In all, the Ski Area Campiglio Dolomiti di Brenta-Val di Sole-Val Rendena can offer around 150 km (93 mi) of piste on 98 ski slopes of all difficulty grades, facilitated by 63 lifts. On the east side of the Brenta Group the ski slopes are located on the Paganella. The Paganella Ski Area can offer around 50 km (31 mi) of piste, facilitated by 16 lifts. The skiing area above Molveno at Pradel is very small but offers a splendid view into the central part of the Brenta Group.

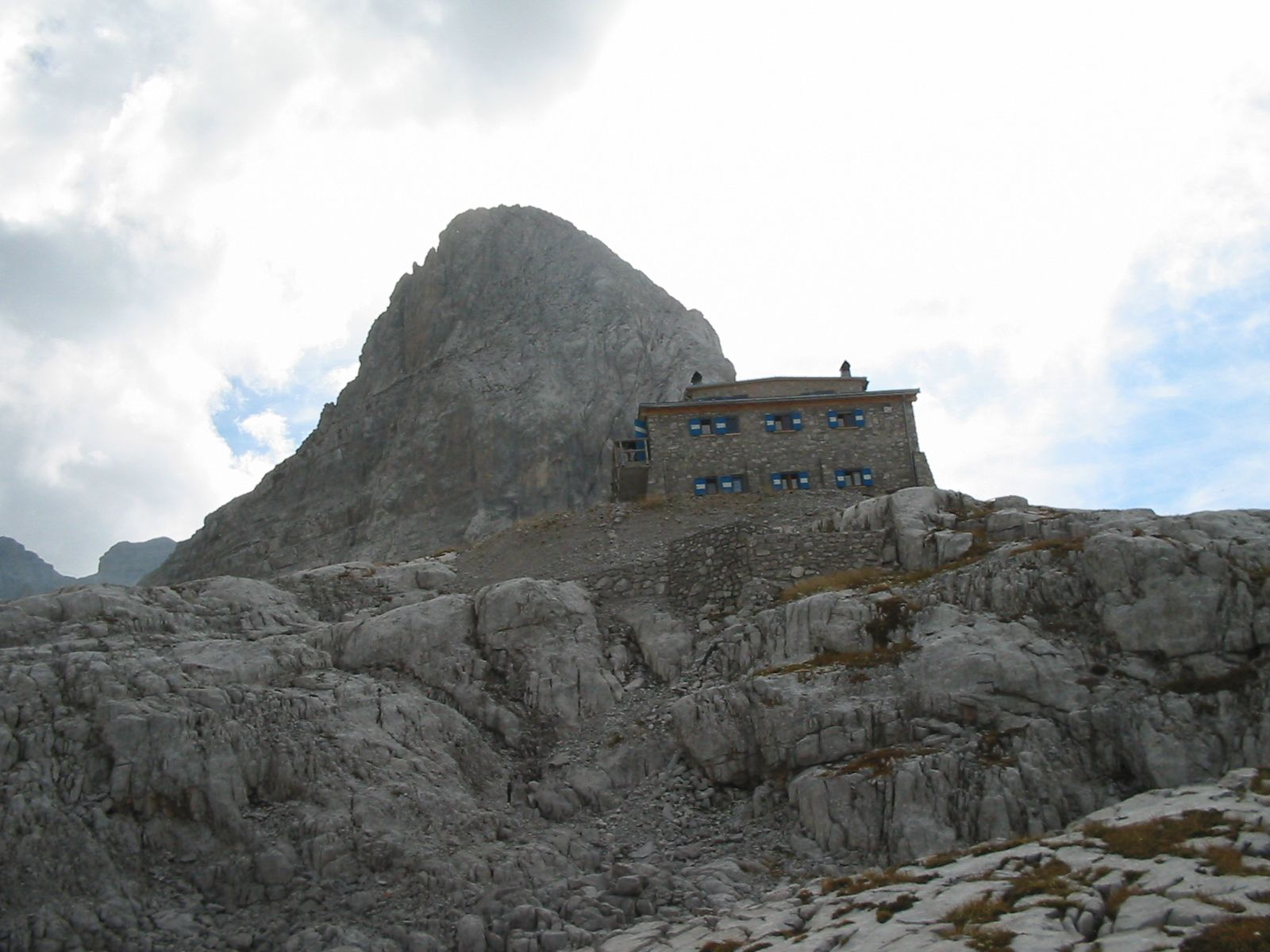
Rif. Dodici Apostoli

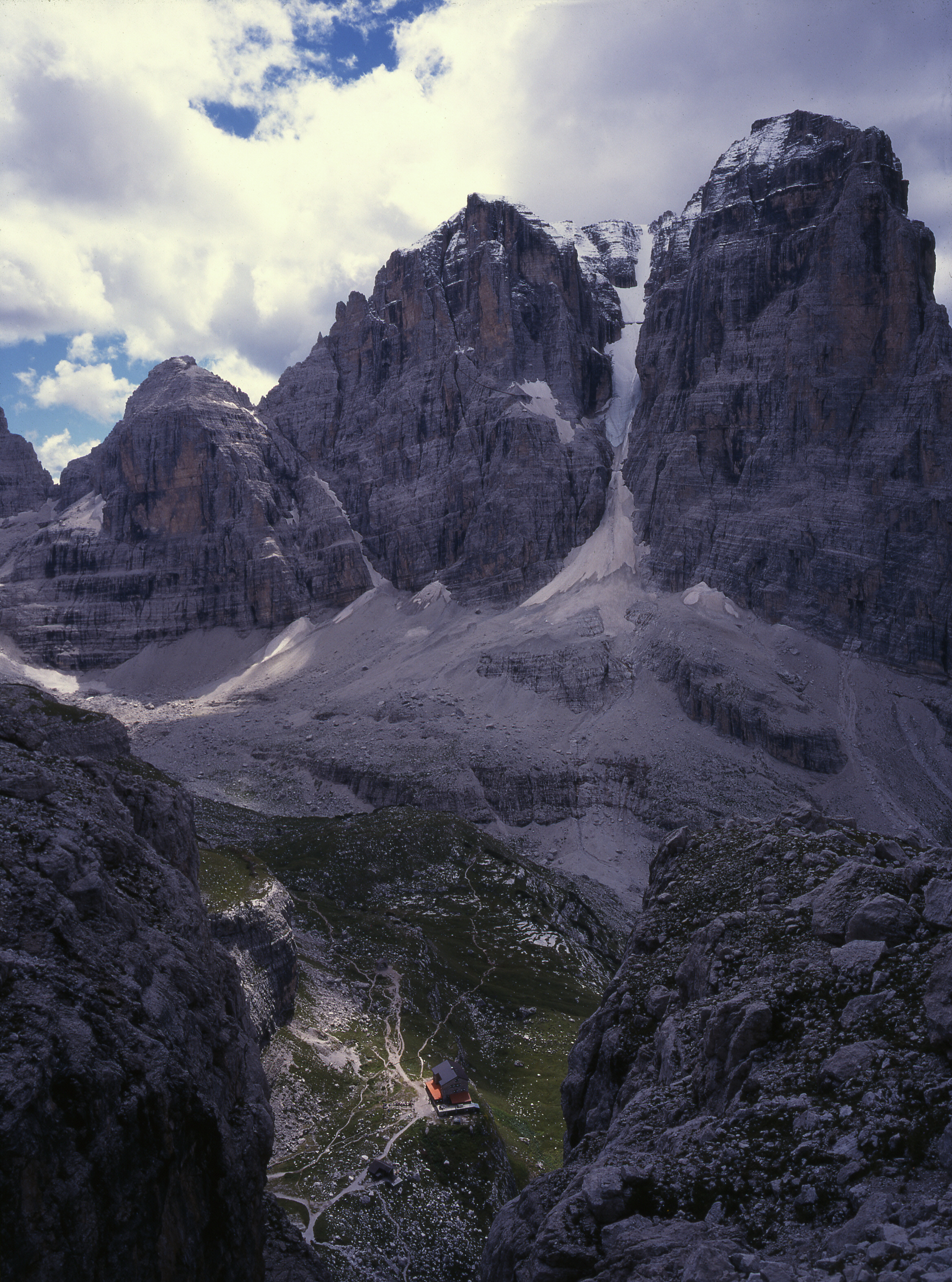
Rif. Brentei

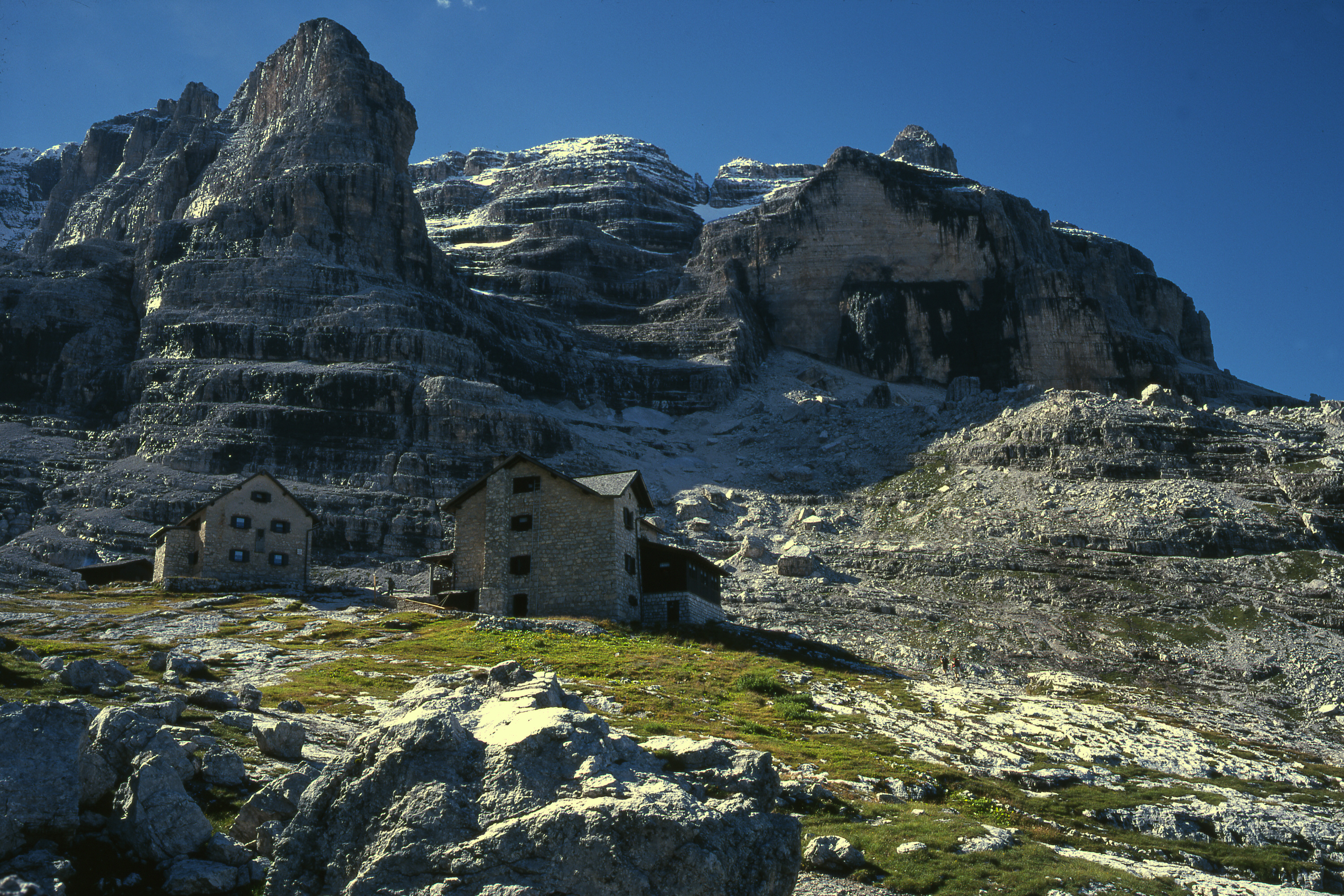
Rif. Tuckett-Sella

Rif. Pedrotti-Tosa

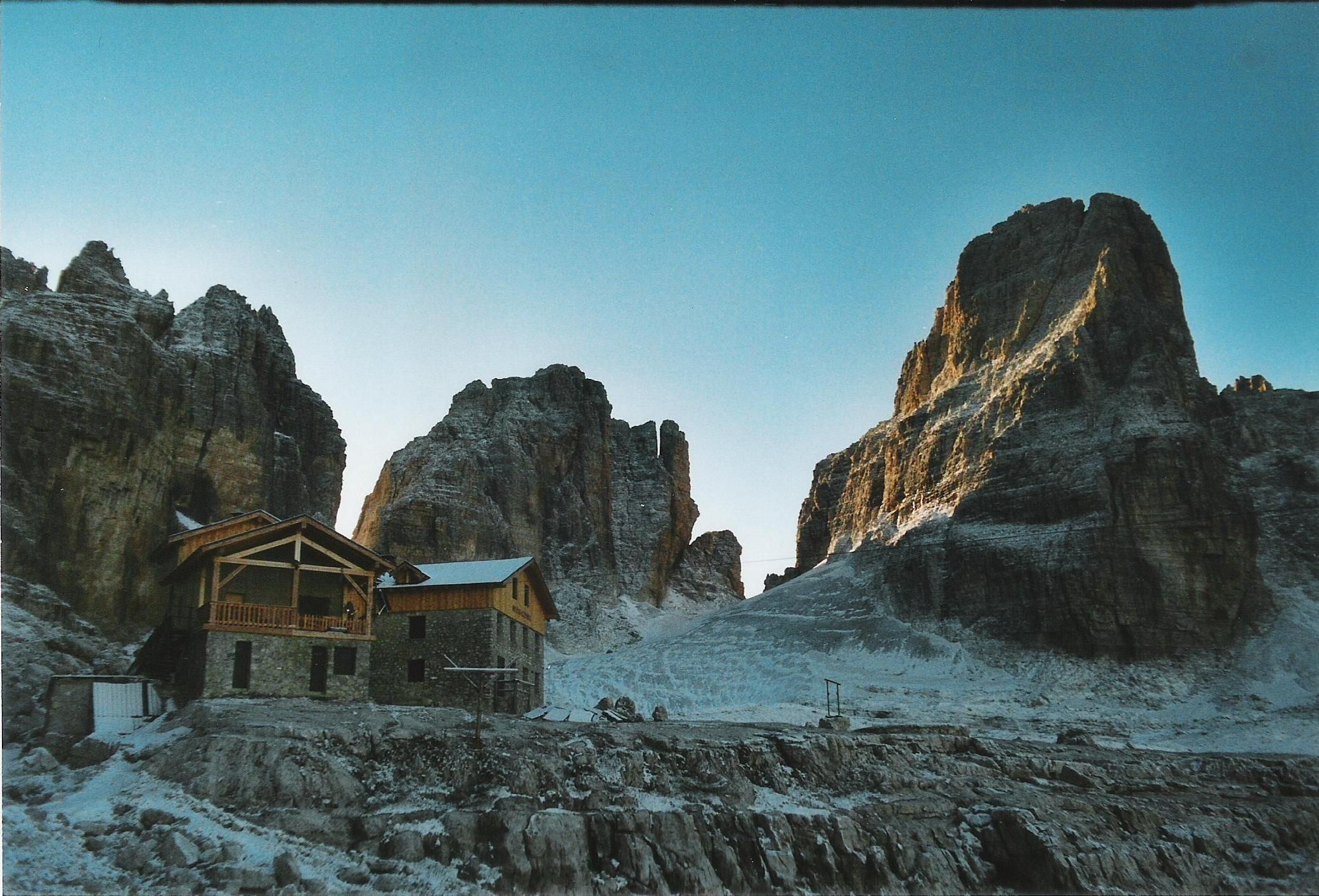
Rif. Alimonta

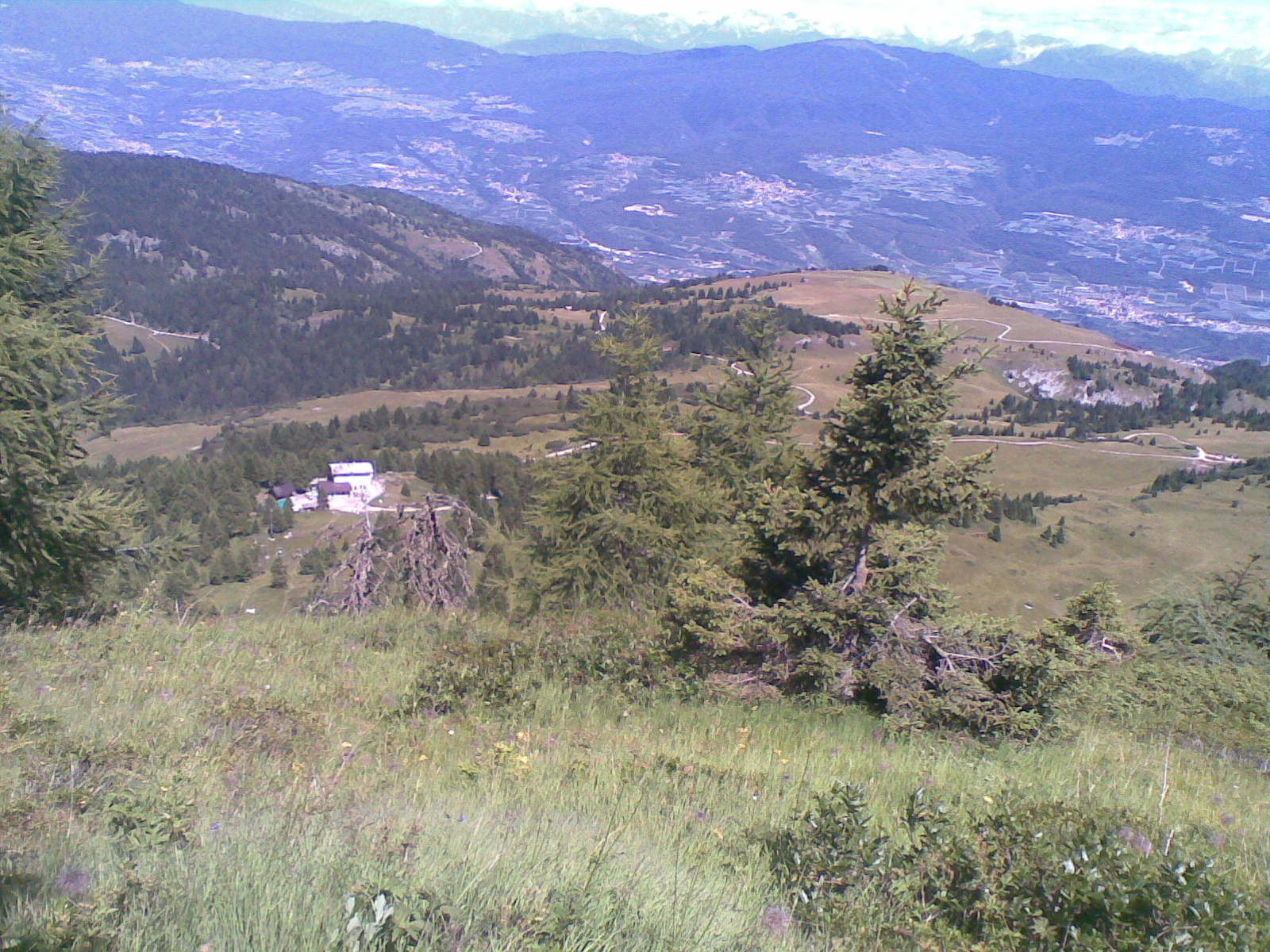
Rif. Peller

Most hikers come to the Brenta Group to hike along the Via della Bocchette and connected vie ferrate, like Sentiero Castiglioni. A completion of the whole south–north itinerary departing from Rif. Agostini along the Sentiero Castiglioni, Sentiero dell'Ideale, Bocchette Centrali, Bocchette Alte, Sentiero Benini and Sentiero Costanzi, ending at Rifugio Peller would require in total approximately 28 walking/climbing hours. Therefore, an entire network of Alpine huts exists above the 2000 meter altitude, mostly operated by the SAT as part of the Club Alpino Italiano:

| Mountain hut | Altitude (m/ft) |
|---|---|
| Rifugio Agostini | 2,410 metres (7,910 ft) |
| Rifugio Garbari ai XII Apostoli | 2,489 metres (8,166 ft) |
| Rifugio Alberto e Maria ai Brentei | 2,120 metres (6,960 ft) |
| Rifugi Tosa e Pedrotti | 2,439 metres (8,002 ft) |
| Rifugio Alimonta | 2,580 metres (8,460 ft) |
| Rifugi Tuckett e Sella | 2,272 metres (7,454 ft) |
| Rifugio Graffer al Grostè | 2,261 metres (7,418 ft) |
| Rifugio Peller | 2,022 metres (6,634 ft) |

Several privately owned mountain huts can be found at lower altitudes. Signed mountain paths cross the entire Brenta Dolomites, giving access to much frequented areas of these mountains. Hikers can choose between very challenging itineraries like the Bochette Alte or less demanding alternatives but should always come well prepared with the right equipment, safety gear and precautions against sudden weather changes. A few small shelter huts (It.:bivacco) have been erected at high and remote altitudes: Bivacco Castiglioni (3,135 m [10,285 ft]) at the summit of Crozzon di Brenta, Bivacco Bonvecchio (2,790 m [9,150 ft]) 300 m (980 ft) north of the Cima Sassara, and Bivacco Costanzi at 2,365 m (7,759 ft) on the Sasso Rosso. Some peripheral subgroups, like Ghez, Daino, Vallon and Campa are far away from all the touristic attention - even on an August day. These wild remote areas pose their own specific challenges and a hike in these areas requires cautious preparation. Those areas, however, are somehow less interesting for the vertical rock climbers because of the fragility of the more calcareous rock. For these climbers the peaks and pinnacles of the Central Chain - made up of solid Dolomia principale- remain the main attraction. Challenging historic itineraries like the Via Preuss and Diedro Fehrmann on Campanile Basso, the Via Schulz and the Pilastro die Francesi on the Crozzon di Brenta, the Via Videsott on the Cima Margherita, the Via Dibona on the Croz dell'Altissimo and so many other classic routes and their endless variants attract many climbers every year. The Brenta group has become also popular with mountain bikers and has become in the last decade a base for paragliders. Former European Champion (2006, 2010) and World Cup Silver Medalist (2011) Paragliding Luca Donini is from Molveno.

== See also ==
- Central Eastern Alps
- Dolomites
- Limestone Alps
