= Crozzon di Brenta =

Mountain in Italy

Coordinates: 46°09′44″N 10°52′08″E

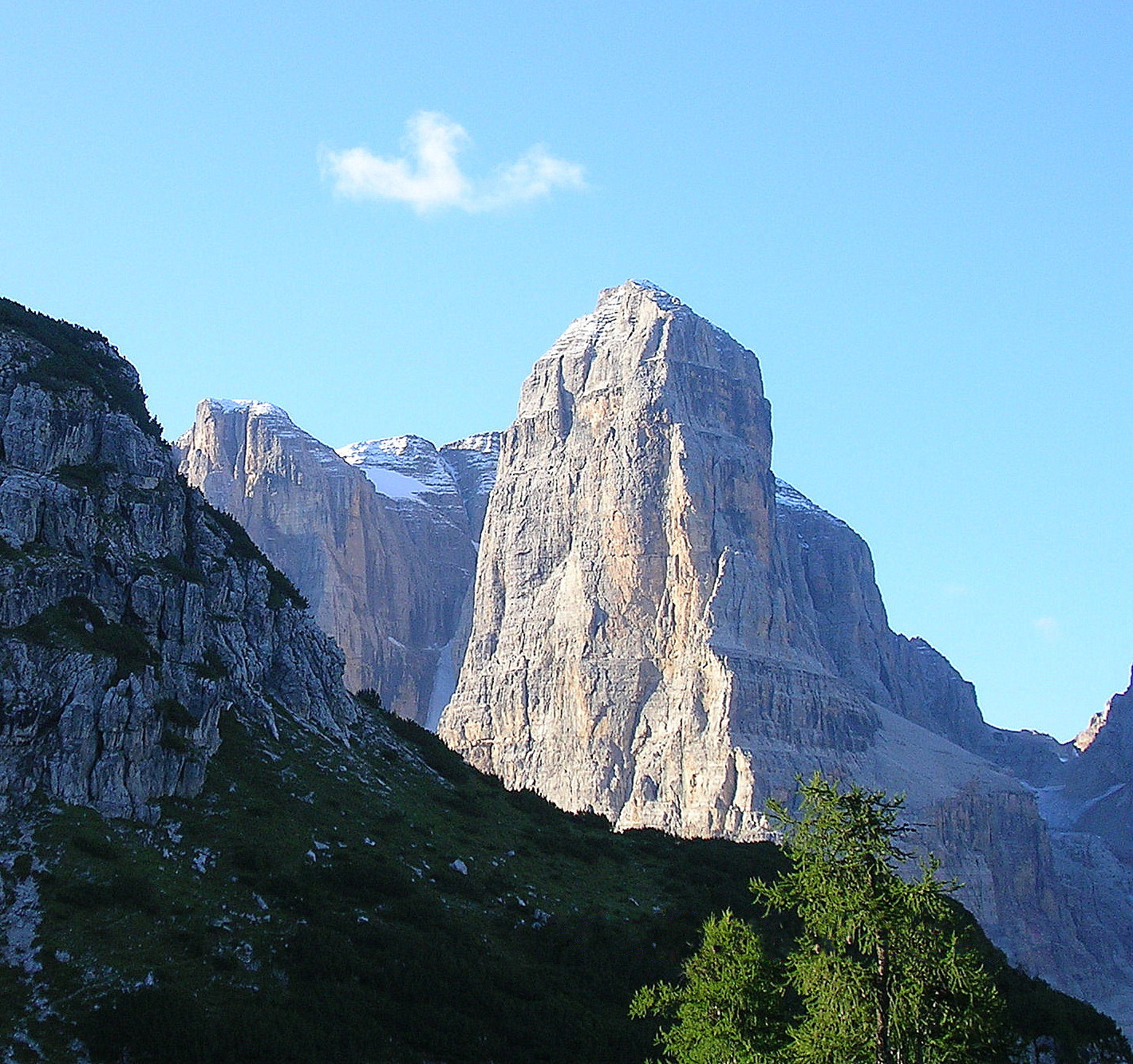
A view of the Crozzon di Brenta

Crozzon di Brenta (3,135m) is a mountain in the Brenta Group of the Southern Limestone Alps in Trentino, Italy. It has three summits and is the most popular destination for mountaineering in the Brenta Group. It is connected to its parent peak Cima Tosa by a short ridge.
