= Cima Brenta =

Mountain in the Rhaetian Alps in Italy

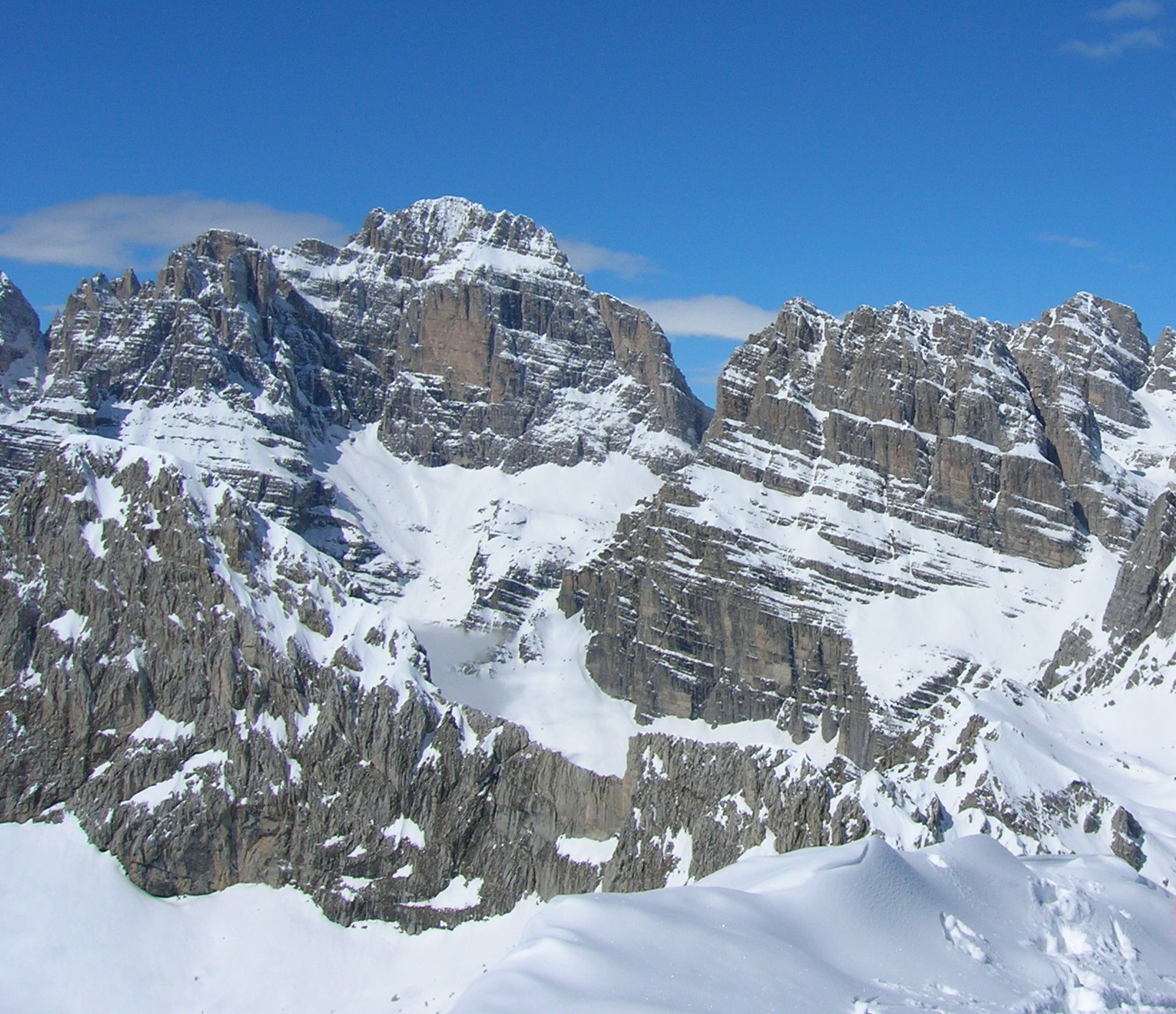
- East face of Cima Brenta

Highest point
- Elevation: 3,150 m (10,330 ft)IGM
- Prominence: 1,501 m (4,925 ft)
- Isolation: 17.48 km (10.86 mi)
- Listing: Ultra; Alpine mountains above 3000 m
- Coordinates: 46°9′20″N 10°54′02″E

Geography
- Location within Alps
- Location: Trentino, Italy
- Parent range: Brenta Group, Rhaetian Alps

Climbing
- First ascent: August 1871
- Easiest route: Via Normale da nord

Cima Brenta is the highest mountain in the Brenta group (It.: Dolomiti di Brenta), a subgroup of the Rhaetian Alps in the Italian Region of Trentino-Alto Adige, with a reported height of 3,150 metres (10,330 ft). The mountain rises imposingly up between the rock towers and pinnacles of the central Brenta Group. A sharp ridge connects the mountain on its southern side to the Spallone die Massodi. The northern ridge steeply descends towards Bocca del Tuckett. Towards north west a slender couloir descends all the way from the top towards the Vedretta di Brenta Inferiore, the mountain's 'lower' glacier. Large shouldering formations extend towards the west, culminating in the Cima Mandrone and the Punti di Campiglio, and northwest, culminating in the Cima Massari. Above these formations a glacier, the Vedretta di Brenta Superiore, the 'upper' glacier descends the mountain, being cut off by a vertical precipice over the Vedretta di Brenta Inferiore. On the eastern side the mountain rises up with an imposing 700-meter high vertical rock face with on its left side a distinct orange-like color. Above this lies a horizontal ledge, the Cengia Garbari, on which the Via delle Bocchette Alte proceeds. The actual mountain has two summits that are some 250 meters apart, of which the eastern top reaches the highest altitude. The glaciers, vedrette, have been shrinking steadily over the last decades as a result of climate change. The historical name Cima Brenta was not always as evident as it is today. The toponymy of these parts was largely established by Nepomuceno Bolognini. The mountain, somehow, became a place where nationalistic sentiments were demonstrated. In 1889 the Austro-Hungarian authorities decided to rename the mountain to Kaiser Franz Josef-Spitze. The name never caught on -not even in German literature. When the occasion occurred to raise a large yellow-black imperial flag on the summit, fully visible from Val Rendena as well as from Molveno, local guide Giuseppe 'Bepaccia' Zeni and some companions climbed the mountain to take it down. In 1912, on the other hand, the Italian flag was hoisted by irredentists on Cima Brenta, deliberately just before the first snow fall, so that the flag remained visible until the next summer. Around 1953 electricity company SISM, predecessor of ENEL proposed to build a cable car trajectory from Molveno to the top of Cima Brenta. The plans were abandoned and in 1967 the mountain became protected as part of the Parco Naturale Adamello-Brenta.

== Climbing history ==
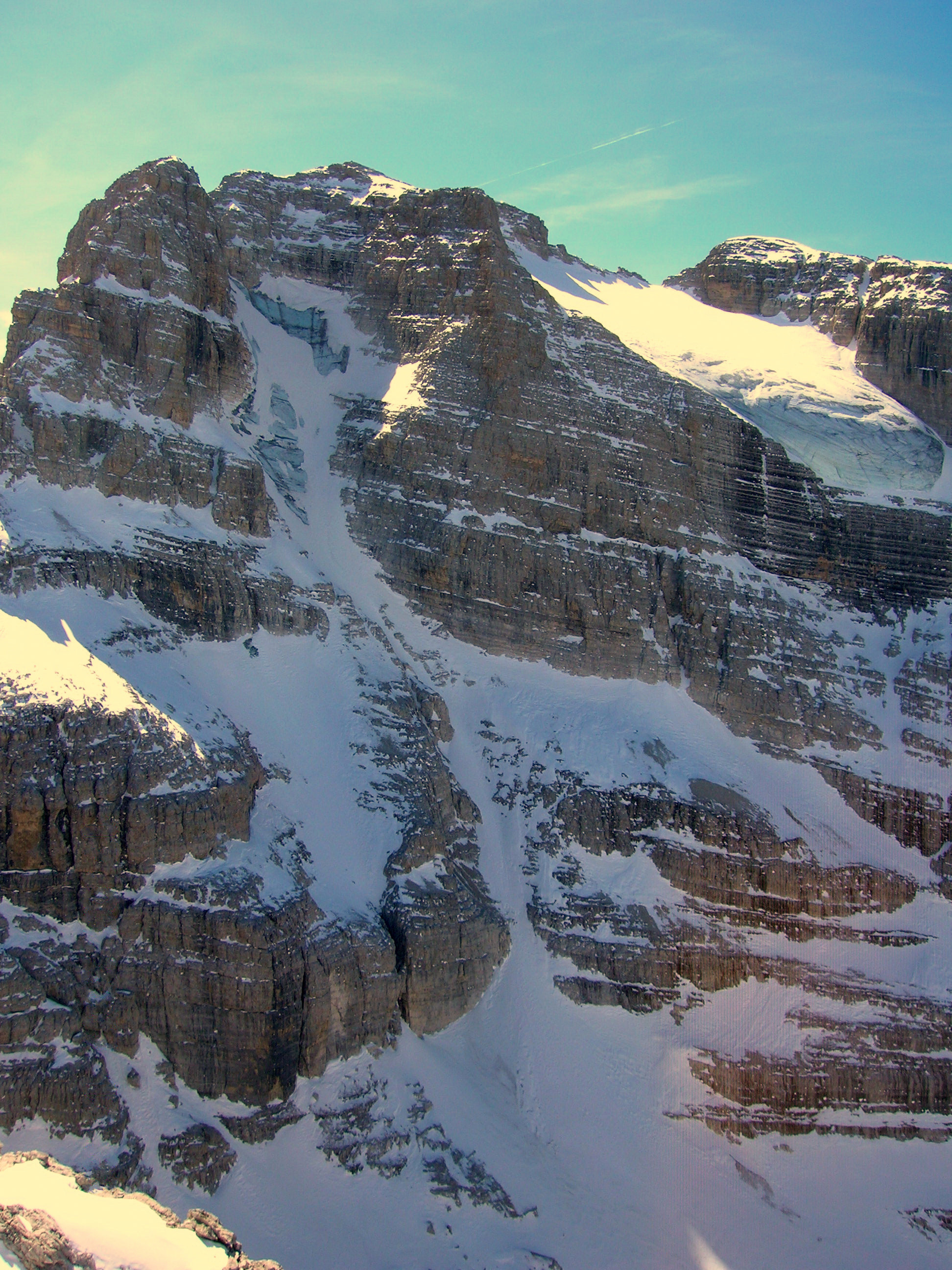
Cima Brenta NW Face

The first men to climb to the summit of Cima Brenta were Douglas Freshfield and Francis Fox Tuckett. with Henri Devouassoud from Chamonix in August 1871. They approached the mountain from the west and ascended mainly over the snow of the vedrette. This itinerary would remain the only way for a number of years, until Albert DeFalkner and E.T.Compton found a new itinerary from the south in 1882. Carlo Garbari with companions Angelo and Arnaldo Ferrari, Benvenuto Lorenzetti and Rudolf Oesterreicher with the guides Andrea Dallagiacomo from Campiglio and Matteo Nicolussi from Molveno. traced in 1892 a new route over the northern edge towards the ledge on the east side that bears his name today and from there through a series of gullies to the summit. This route, and a variant traced in 1902 by Hanns Barth a.o. in 1902, are now considered the Via Normale. In 1910, The Kiene brothers, made it to the top over the complete northwest ridge from Cima Massari over the jagged pinnacles that are now called Torri di Kiene. The majestic east face was not attempted until 1930, when Mario Agostini and A. Moser opened the Via Agostini-Moser (UIAA: IV, 650 m.). This route follows a winding trajectory through the northern part of the East Wall. Matteo Armani and Marcello Friedrichsen realized the via Diretta in 1936 (V, 500 m.). A year later Silvio Agostini died on Cima Brenta in an accident and Armani climbed and baptized Torre Caigo, a pinnacle on the south face of Cima Mandrone, in his honor. Other challenging trajectories were climbed by renown climbers in the decades following on all parts of the mountain. The first skiing descent down the NW couloir from the top was accomplished by Heini Holzer and Ander Tscholl in 1970. The first epic ascent of the hard north face through the hanging glacier was made by Giovanni Groaz, Lorenzo Groaz and Romano Segalla (August 1974). The imposing orange wall within the east face remained however the last big problem of the Brenta and unchallenged until 1964. By then, even the most repelling rock faces were conquered by means of artificial climbing. It took three men three days, 150 pitons, 18 expansion bolts and 15 other devices to force their way upward to the Garbari ridge (Via Verona: VI, A3, Ae, 650 m.) At the time, the 40-hour climb of Franco Baschera, Claudio Boscho and Milo Navasa was considered an enormous achievement. But the use of expansion bolts and other artificial means in general became subject of criticism. In the end it took until 2002 for this route to be free-climbed on sight by Rolando Larcher and Franco Cavallero in a mere eleven hours.

== Today ==
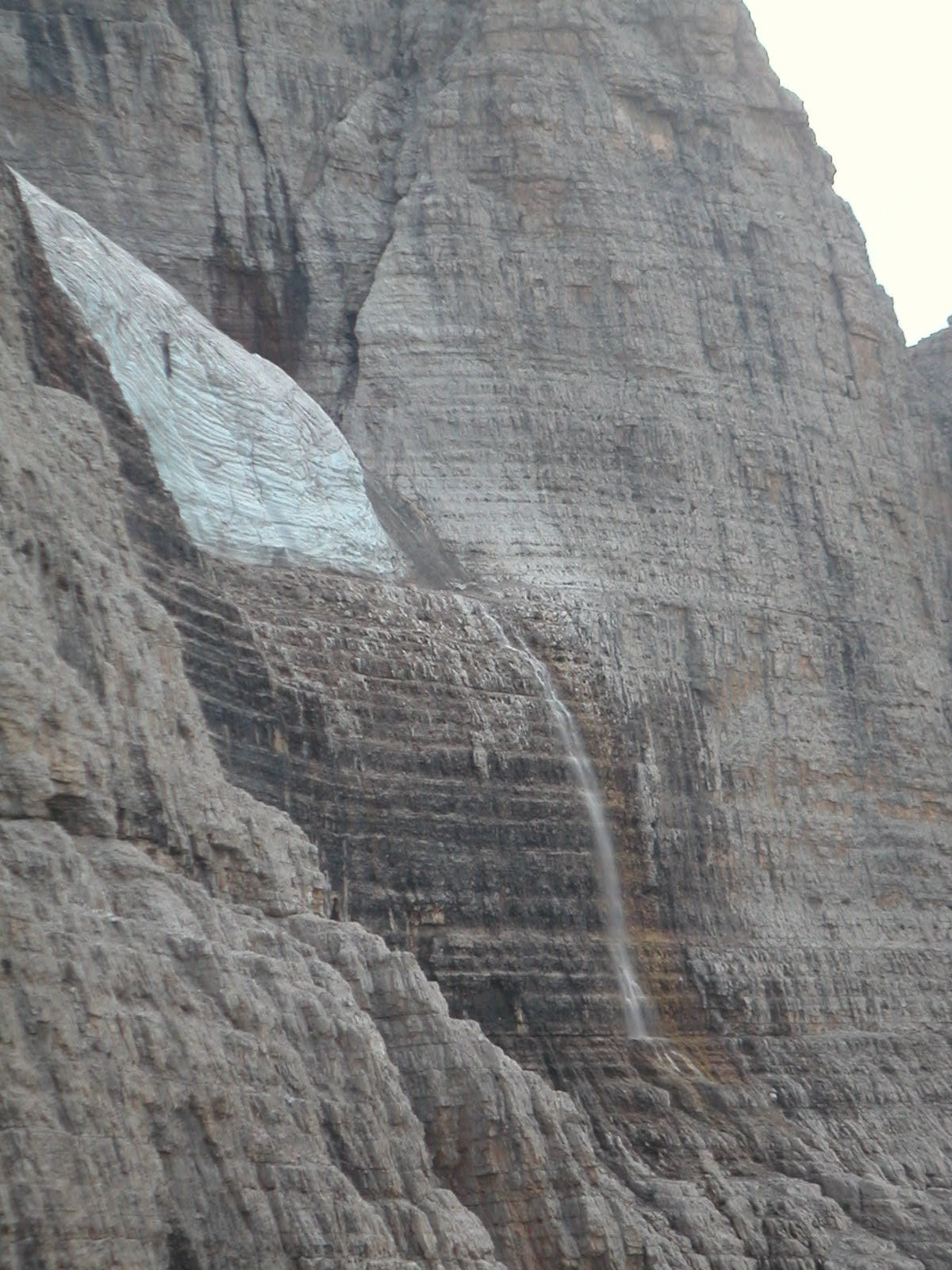
Climate change on Cima Brenta. Vedretta Superiore di Brenta like a melting popsicle, summer 2003

Climbers and hikers find numerous ways to climb to the top, where a view from the top awaits them - good visibility provided. Most of the via normale del nord is nowadays covered by the Via delle Bocchette Alte, especially the parts dedicated to Enrico Pedrotti and Dorotea Foresti. Although most hikers will let the summit be to continue the hike on the Via delle Bocchette Alte on the Garbari ledge towards the Spallone di Massodi, some might take the trouble to climb to the top of Cima Brenta through the two gullies that lead upwards from where the horizontal ridge becomes widest. Others might undertake the slightly more demanding southern Via Normale departing from Rif. Brentei. Climbers will find numerous challenging itineraries especially on the east and south face of the mountain. The mountain huts that might serve as a forward base are rifugio Tuckett, rifugio Brentei and rifugio Alimonta.
