= Molveno =

- Comune
- Comune di Molveno
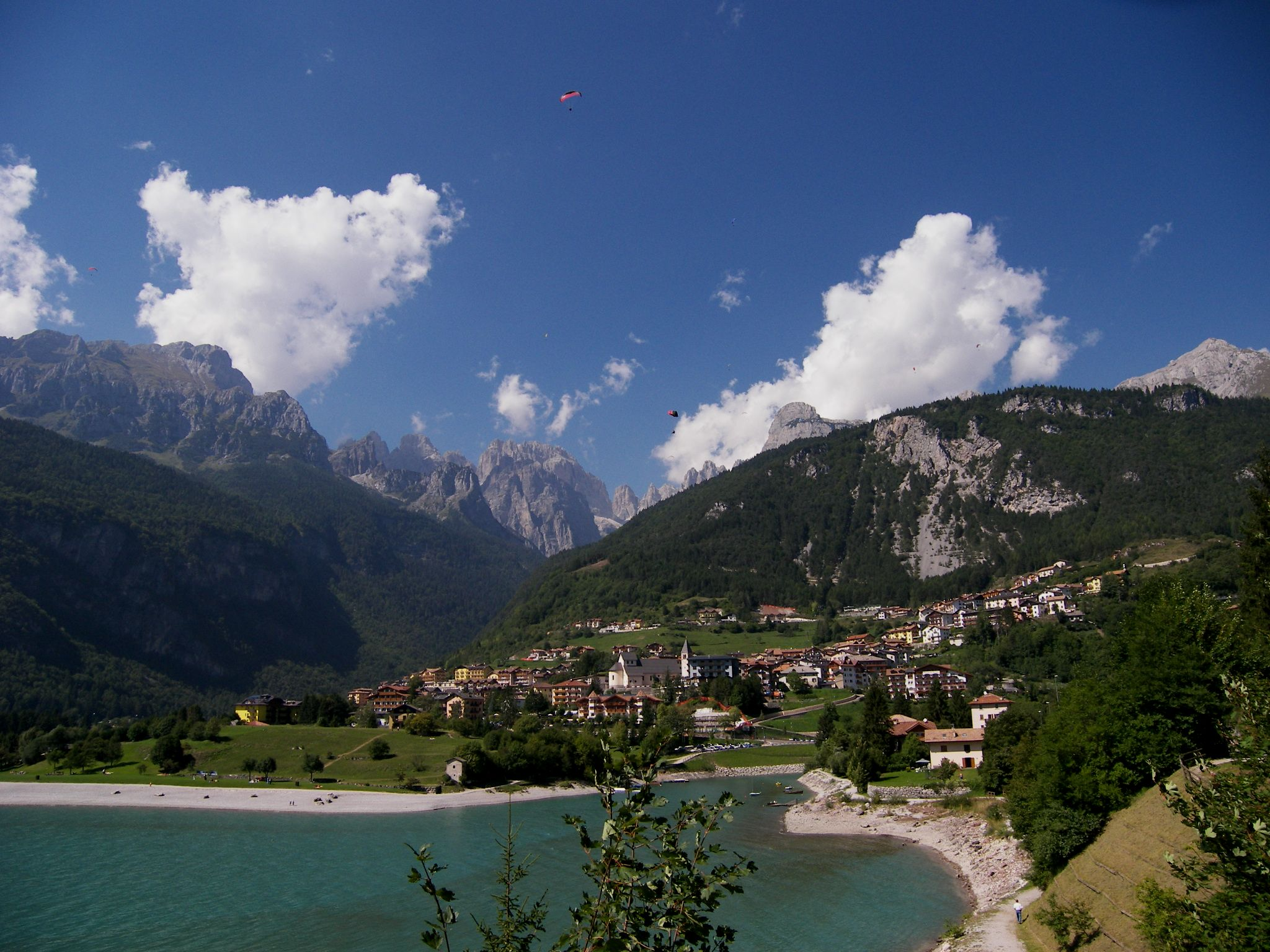
- Molveno and its lake.

- Location within Italy Location within Trentino-Alto Adige/Südtirol
- Coordinates: 46°9′N 10°58′E
- Country: Italy
- Region: Trentino-Alto Adige/Südtirol
- Province: Trentino (TN)

Government
  - Mayor: Lorenzo Donini

Area
  - Total: 35.2 km^{2} (13.6 sq mi)
- Elevation: 864 m (2,835 ft)

Population (2026)
  - Total: 1,100
  - Density: 31/km^{2} (81/sq mi)
- Demonym: Molvenesi
- Time zone: UTC+1 (CET)
  - Summer (DST): UTC+2 (CEST)
- Postal code: 38018
- Dialing code: 0461
- Patron saint: St. Charles Borromeo
- Saint day: November 4
- Website: Official website

Molveno is a comune (municipality) in Trentino in the northern Italian region of Trentino-Alto Adige/Südtirol, located about 40 kilometres (25 mi) northwest of Trento. It is famous for its positioning on Lake Molveno as a holiday destination, its proximity to the Brenta Dolomites and its connection to the National Park Adamello Brenta.

== Geography ==
Molveno is located at the northern end of a 4-kilometre (2.5 mi) long lake (Lago di Molveno), at the foot of the Brenta Group and the Paganella mountain.

The Lake of Molveno, formed by a landslide about 4000 years ago, is the second largest in Trentino-Alto Adige, 3.3 square kilometres (1.3 mi^{2}). It has a maximum depth of 123 metres (404 ft). It's famous for its diverse fish species, including trout, arctic char and perch.

Molveno borders the following municipalities: Andalo, Cavedago, Ragoli, San Lorenzo in Banale, Spormaggiore, Terlago, Tuenno and Vezzano.

== History ==
The area of Molveno is known to have been settled since the Neolithic age. Due to its strategic position at the entrance of the Brenta-Paganella plateau, it was contended between the Bishops of Trento, the counts of Tyrol and the counts of Flavon.

From 1802 to 1805 the Austrians had a series of fortification built on the lake to halt the French troops.
