= Strada statale 12 dell'Abetone e del Brennero =

State highway in Italy

State Highway 12
- Strada statale 12

Route information
- Maintained by ANAS
- Length: 523.6 km (325.3 mi)
- Existed: 1928–present

Major junctions
- From: Pisa
- To: Brenner Pass

Location
- Country: Italy
- Regions: Tuscany, Emilia-Romagna, Lombardy, Veneto, Trentino-Alto Adige/Südtirol

Highway system
- Roads in Italy; Autostrade; State; Regional; Provincial; Municipal
← SS 11	→ SS 13

Strada statale 12 dell'Abetone e del Brennero (SS 12) is an Italian state highway 523.6 kilometres (325.3 mi) long in Italy located in the regions of Tuscany, Emilia-Romagna, Lombardy, Veneto and Trentino-Alto Adige/Südtirol that connects Pisa to the Austrian border at Brenner Pass.

== Route (section Verona - Trento - Salorno) ==
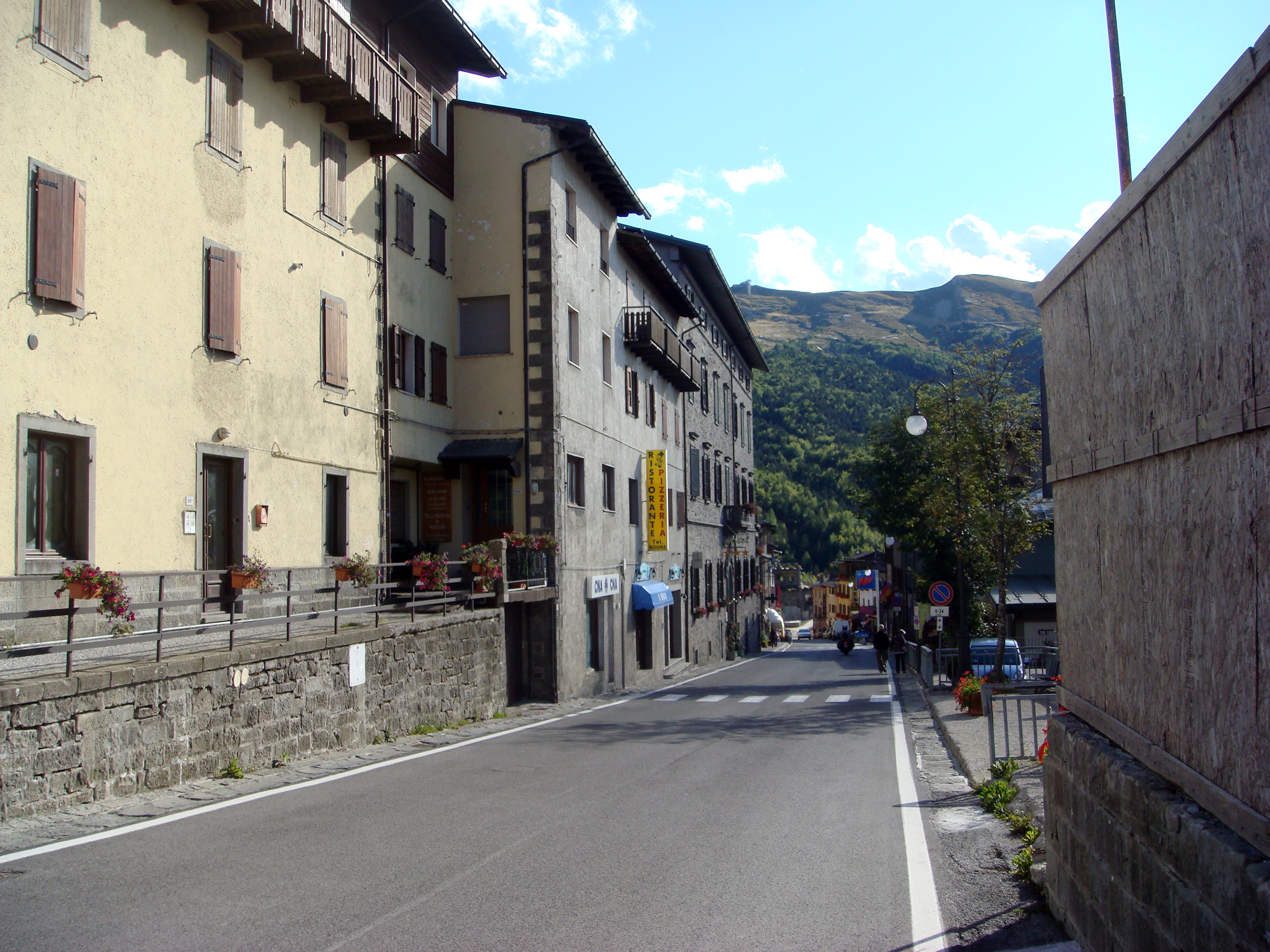
Strada statale 12 dell'Abetone e del Brennero in Abetone

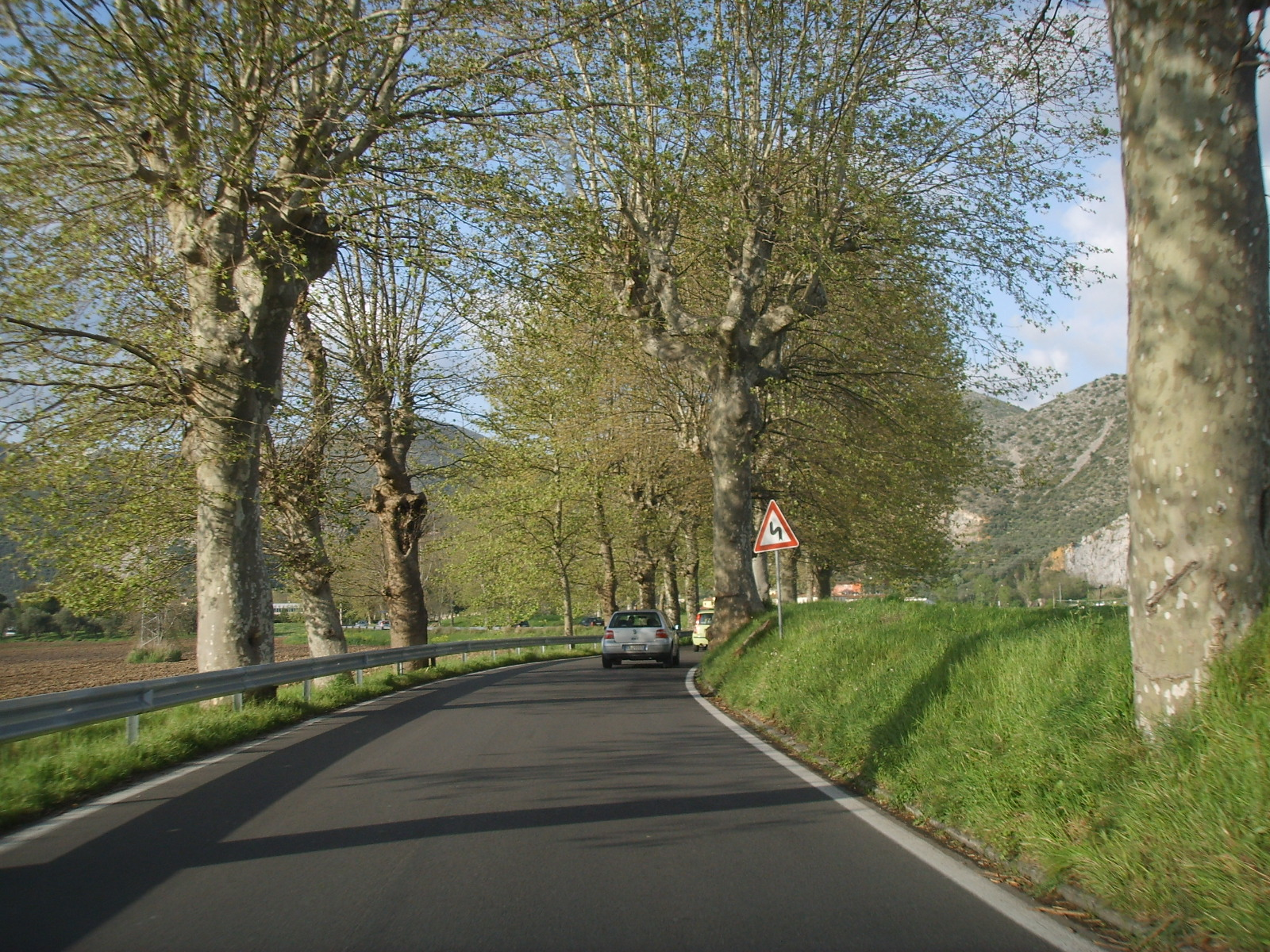
Strada statale 12 dell'Abetone e del Brennero in Pisa

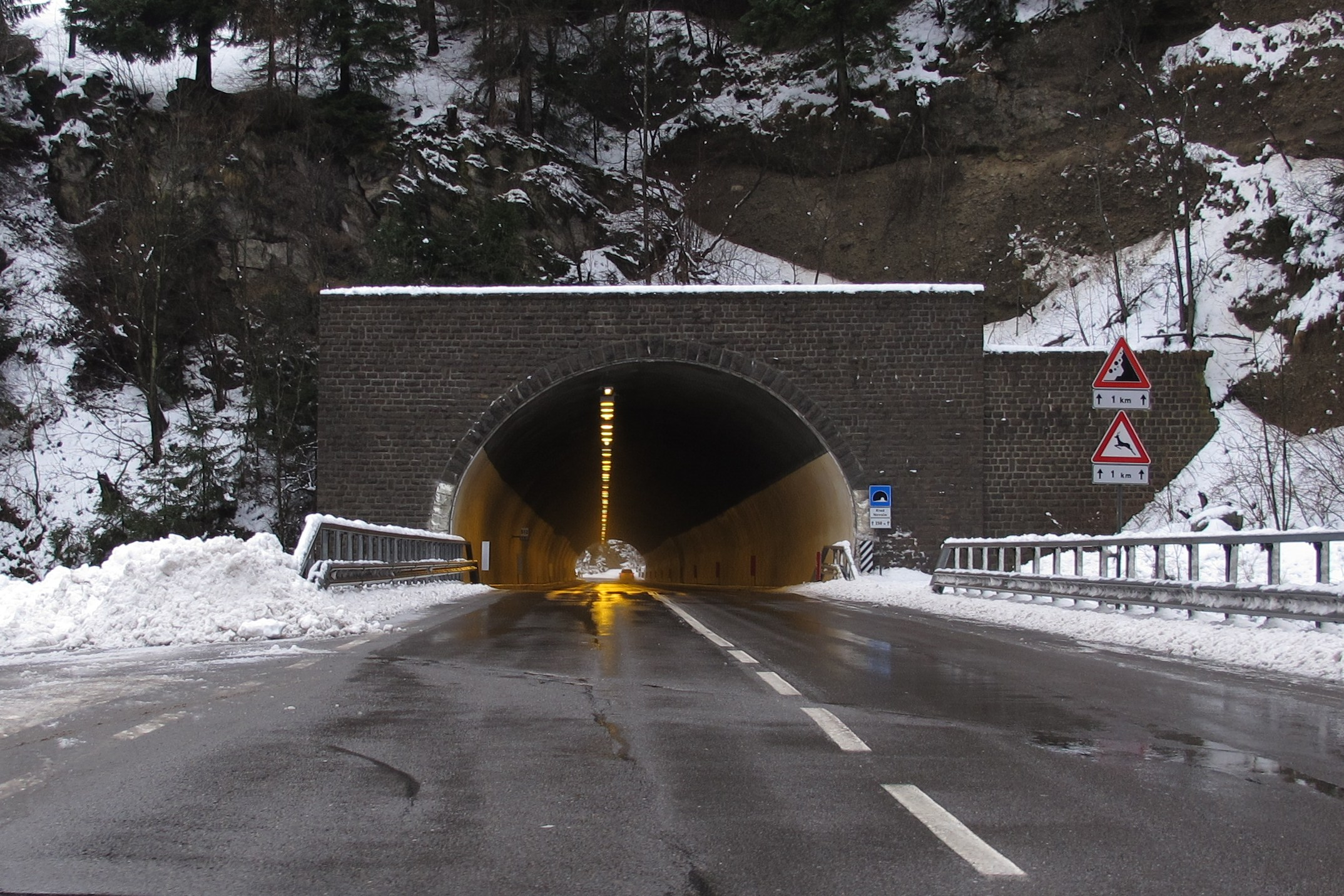
Strada statale 12 dell'Abetone e del Brennero in Colle Isarco

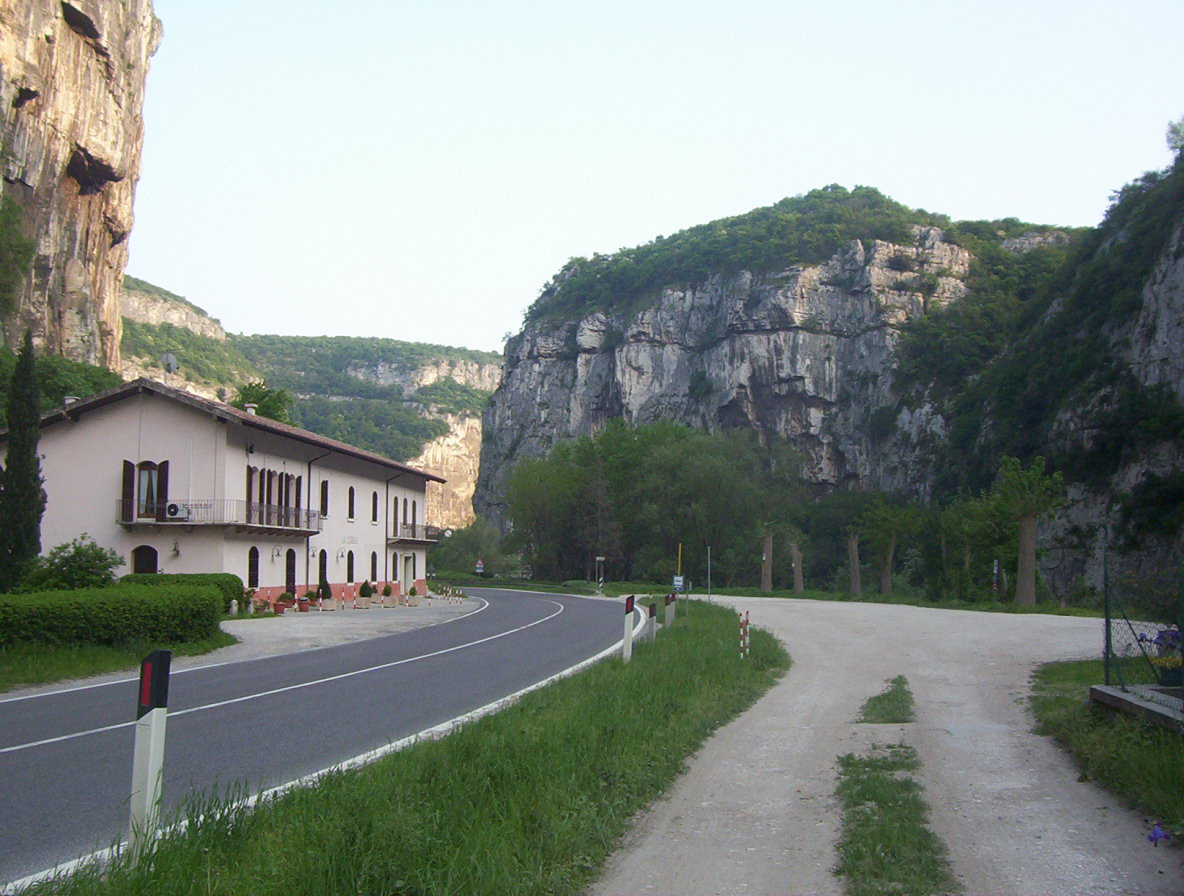
Strada statale 12 dell'Abetone e del Brennero in Dolcè

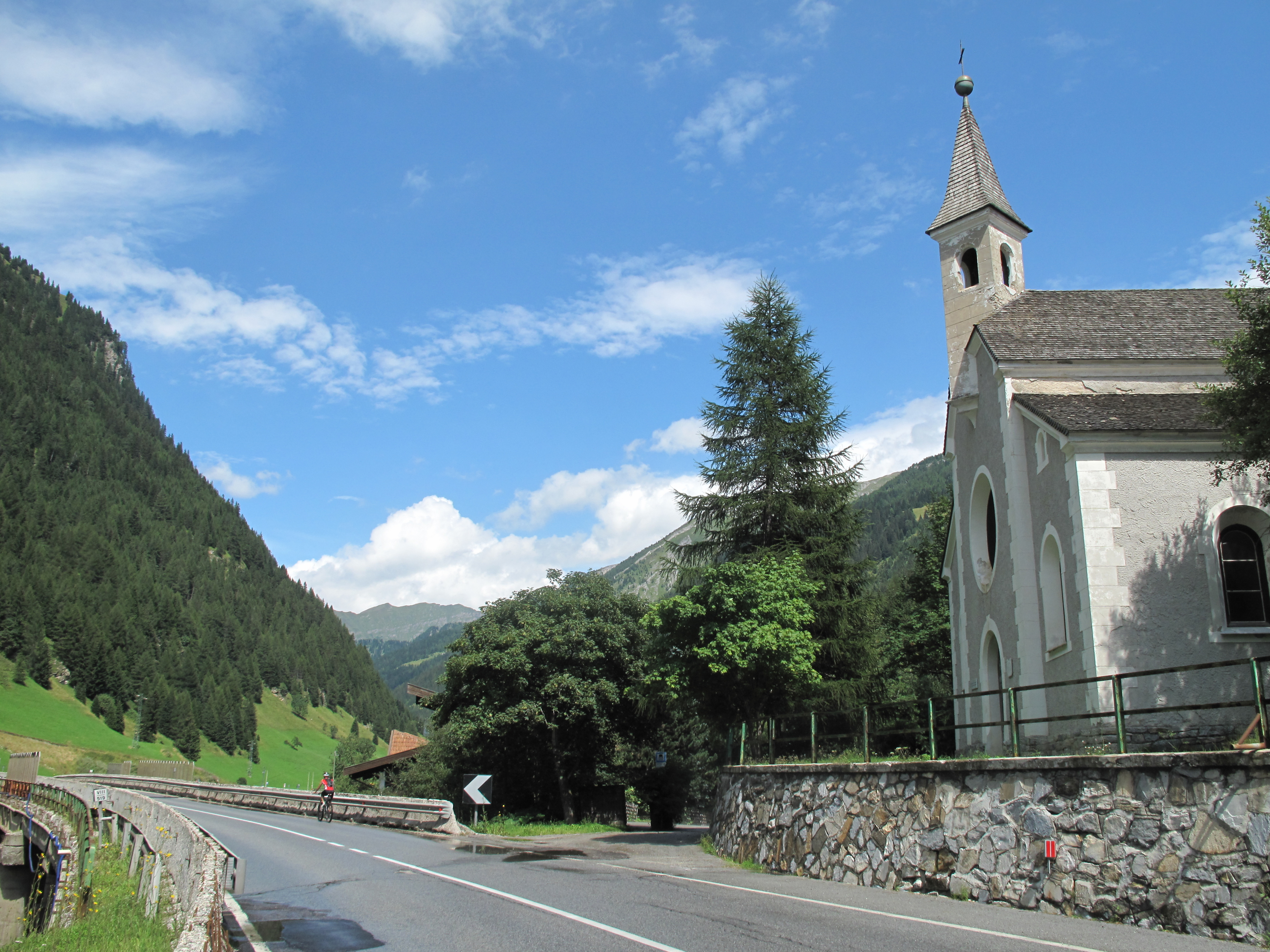
Strada statale 12 dell'Abetone e del Brennero in Brennero

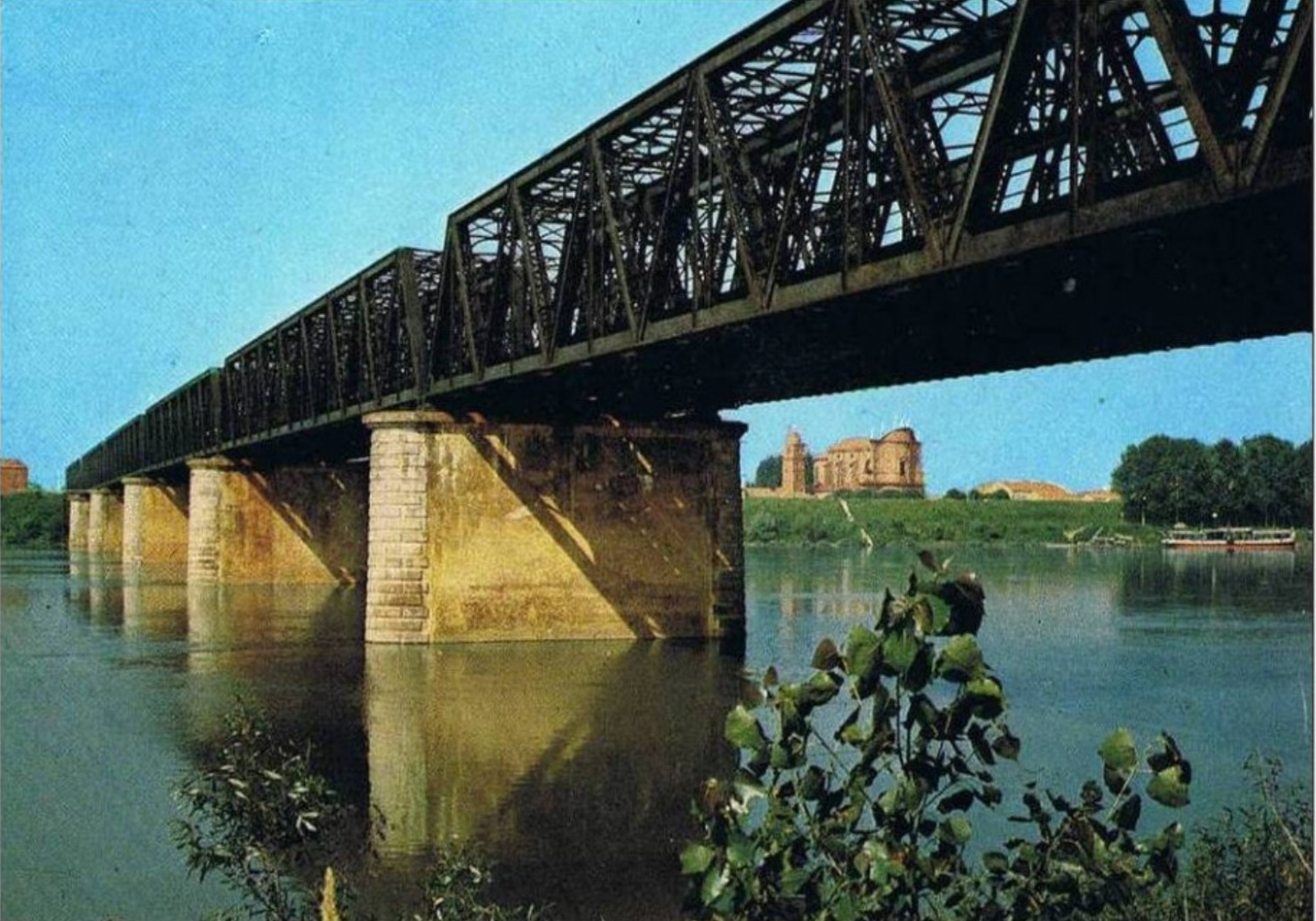
Strada statale 12 dell'Abetone e del Brennero in Ostiglia

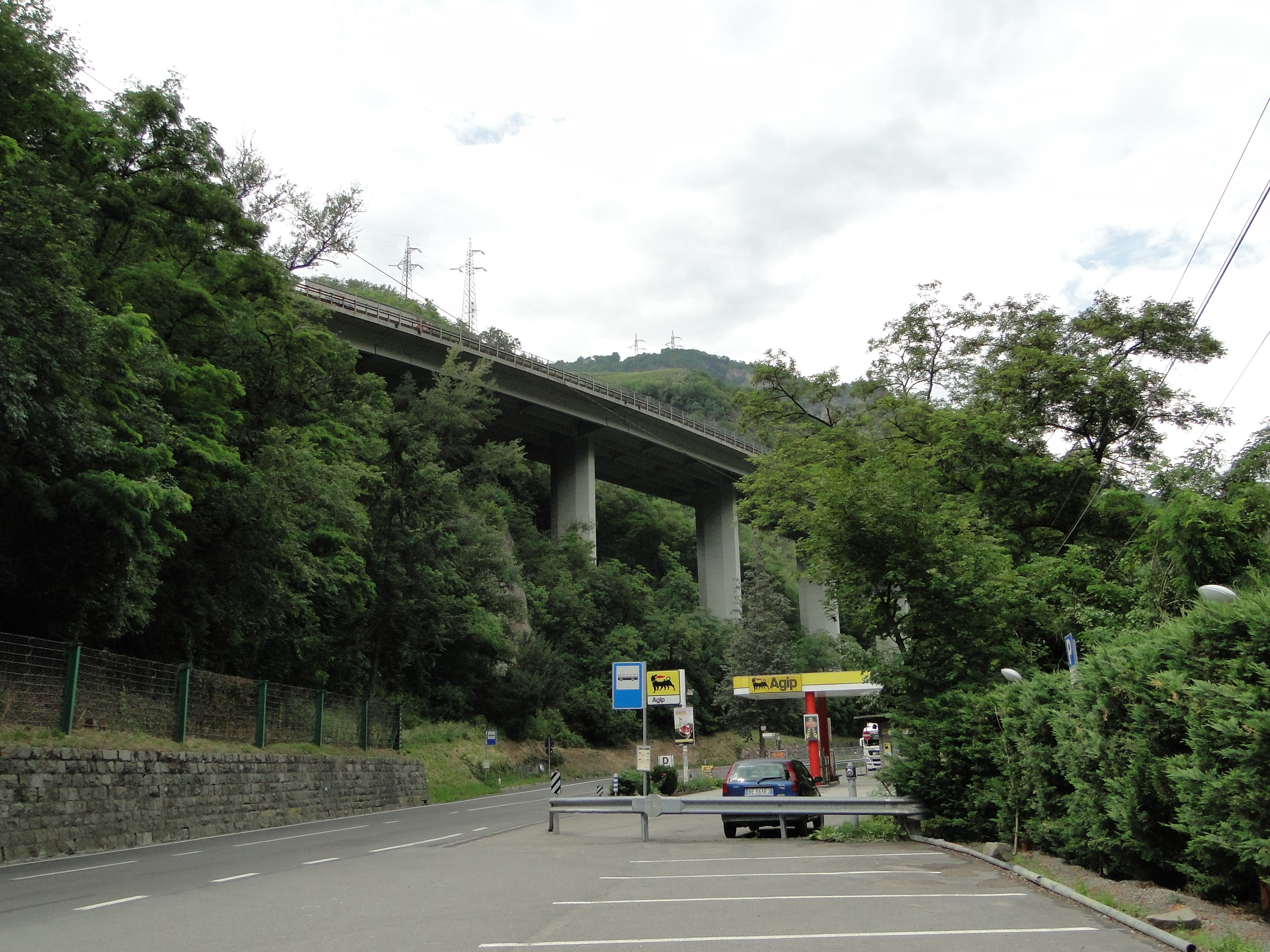
Strada statale 12 dell'Abetone e del Brennero in Renon

dell'Abetone e del Brennero
Exit	↓km↓	Province
Cà di David		VR
Vicenza Rovigo - Transpolesana - Legnago	282 km (175 mi)	VR
Borgo Roma - Borgo Trento - Verona Porta Nuova railway station Transpolesana - Legnago - Rovigo - Vicenza - Monti Lessini Mantua - Trento - Brescia - Lago di Garda downtown - Stadio Marcantonio Bentegodi - Fiera di Verona - Z.A.I. - Autostrade	282 km (175 mi)	VR
Tangenziale Sud di Verona		VR
Trento - Padana Superiore - Brescia Lago di Garda - Valpolicella - Borgo Trento della Cisa - Mantua - Villafranca - Sommacampagna Verona Villafranca Airport		VR
Tangenziale Ovest di Verona		VR
Verona - Borgo Trento Water Park Valpopark	300 km (190 mi)	VR
Trento - BrenneroDolcè - Domegliara - Affi San Pietro in Cariano - Valpolicella	300.2 km (186.5 mi)	VR
Tangenziale Ovest di Verona - Verona - Mantua - Brescia Verona Villafranca Airport - Interporto - Modena - Milano-Venezia Verona - Borgo Trento - San Pietro in Cariano - Valpolicella	300.2 km (186.5 mi)	VR
Via Trento	300.4 km (186.7 mi)	VR
Via Monte Baldo	300.9 km (187.0 mi)	VR
Rest area	301.1 km (187.1 mi)	VR
Via Cà Vignega - Via Pretura	301.3 km (187.2 mi)	VR
Via Ospedaletto	301.6 km (187.4 mi)	VR
Domegliara - Sant'Ambrogio di Valpolicella - San Giorgio	301.9 km (187.6 mi)	VR
Vicolo la Ponta - Via Busa	302.1 km (187.7 mi)	VR
Rest area - Via Busa	302.2 km (187.8 mi)	VR
Arcè	302.6 km (188.0 mi)	VR
Santa Lucia - Verona Aquardens Spa	302.8 km (188.2 mi)	VR
Rest area	303.3 km (188.5 mi)	VR
Domegliara	303.4 km (188.5 mi)	VR
Via Quaiara - Via dei Dossi	303.9 km (188.8 mi)	VR
Domegliara - Valpolicella; Trento - Brennero - Lago di Garda - Ponton; Verona - Modena - Milano-Venezia	304.3 km (189.1 mi)	VR
Domegliara-Sant'Ambrogio railway station	304.5 km (189.2 mi)	VR
Via Spagnole	304.7 km (189.3 mi)	VR
Affi - Brennero - Lago di Garda	304.9 km (189.5 mi)	VR
Industrial area Volargne	305.6 km (189.9 mi)	VR
Volargne di Dolcè		VR
Volargne di Dolcè - Villa del Bene	306.8 km (190.6 mi)	VR
Via XXI Novembre - Via Villa del Bene	307.5 km (191.1 mi)	VR
Parking area	307.7 km (191.2 mi)	VR
Chiusa di Ceraino Parking area "La Chiusa"	309.8 km (192.5 mi)	VR
Ceraino di Dolcè - Cycle path	310.4 km (192.9 mi)	VR
Via Fontana - Graveyard	310.7 km (193.1 mi)	VR
Ceraino di Dolcè - Cycle path	311.1 km (193.3 mi)	VR
Via Soman	311.5 km (193.6 mi)	VR
Ecological Island	313.7 km (194.9 mi)	VR
Dolcè	314 km (195 mi)	VR
Industrial area Dolcè - Cycle path	314.5 km (195.4 mi)	VR
Dolcè railway station	314.8 km (195.6 mi)	VR
Dolcè	315 km (196 mi)	VR
Paladolcè - Graveyard	315.1 km (195.8 mi)	VR
Via Ceradello - Cycle path	315.6 km (196.1 mi)	VR
Rivalta - Caprino - Garda	322 km (200 mi)	VR
Peri di Dolcè		VR
Rest area	322.4 km (200.3 mi)	VR
Peri railway station	322.5 km (200.4 mi)	VR
Fosse - Sant'Anna d'Alfaedo - Erbezzo Lessinia - Molina - Ponte di Veia	322.7 km (200.5 mi)	VR
Ossenigo	323.8 km (201.2 mi)	VR
Via San Andrea - Via Madonnina	324.3 km (201.5 mi)	VR
Ossenigo	324.9 km (201.9 mi)	VR
Regional border Trentino-Alto Adige - Veneto	326.2 km (202.7 mi)	VR/TN
Destra Adige dir. Borghetto - Avio Prà Alpesina - Cycle path	326.4 km (202.8 mi)	TN
Borghetto sull'Adige Borghetto sull'Adige railway station	327.7 km (203.6 mi)	TN
Borghetto sull'Adige Borghetto sull'Adige railway station	328.3 km (204.0 mi)	TN
Graveyard - Picnic area	328.4 km (204.1 mi)	TN
Masi d'Avio	329.7 km (204.9 mi)	TN
Rest area	332 km (206 mi)	TN
Destra Adige - Avio - SabbionaraVo' Sinistro - Vo' Destro - Avio railway station - Cycle path	332.4 km (206.5 mi)	TN
Destra Adige - Avio - SabbionaraVo' Sinistro - Vo' Destro - Avio railway station - Cycle path	333.2 km (207.0 mi)	TN
dei Monti Lessini - Altopiano dei Monti LessiniSega di Ala - Malga Riondera - Sdruzzinà	334.8 km (208.0 mi)	TN
Via del Tambuset	335.8 km (208.7 mi)	TN
Via ai "Sabbioni"	335.9 km (208.7 mi)	TN
Via Autari	336.6 km (209.2 mi)	TN
Ala		TN
Viale 4 Novembre - Ala - Ala railway station - Ala swimming pool -	337 km (209 mi)	TN
Viale Malfatti - Ala railway station - Ala - Pharmacy - Post office	337.3 km (209.6 mi)	TN
Ala stream	337.5 km (209.7 mi)	TN
Valle dei Ronchi - Sports field; Trento - Rovereto - Ala; Avio - Pilcante - Autostrada; Verona - Sega di Ala - Lessini - Ala railway station	337.9 km (210.0 mi)	TN
Rest area	338 km (210 mi)	TN
Marani		TN
Buole Pass - Sanctuary of Saint Valentine - Località Prati	340.1 km (211.3 mi)	TN
Rio San Valentino	340.5 km (211.6 mi)	TN
Località Cumer - Località Maso Le Pozze	340.6 km (211.6 mi)	TN
Rio Val Cipriana	341.3 km (212.1 mi)	TN
Santa Margherita	341.4 km (212.1 mi)	TN
Rest area	342.7 km (212.9 mi)	TN
Santa Margherita; Trento - Rovereto; Verona - Ala	343 km (213 mi)	TN
Serravalle all'Adige		TN
Serravalle railway station	343.4 km (213.4 mi)	TN
Destra Adige - Serravalle - Chizzola - Brentonico	343.4 km (213.4 mi)	TN
Industrial area of Marco	345.7 km (214.8 mi)	TN
Rest area	346.4 km (215.2 mi)	TN
Marco - Boulder park - Cycle path	346.5 km (215.3 mi)	TN
Località Gazzi	346.8 km (215.5 mi)	TN
Protezione Civile di Trento; Trento - Rovereto - Brennero; Marco - Boulder park ; Verona - Ala - Modena	348.1 km (216.3 mi)	TN
Località Lavini - Multipurpose field	348.2 km (216.4 mi)	TN
Lavini di Marco Provincial Nature Reserve	349 km (217 mi)	TN
Kennel park of Rovereto	349.7 km (217.3 mi)	TN
C.R.M. of Rovereto	350.1 km (217.5 mi)	TN
Lizzana - Pieve di Lizzana; Verona - Marco - Canile - C.R.M.; Trento - Riva del Garda - Autostrada - Rovereto -	350.4 km (217.7 mi)	TN
Industrial area of Rovereto		TN
Trento - historic center - campana dei Caduti -; di Loppio e Val di Ledro - Riva del Garda - del Monte Baldo - Brentonico - Mori - A22; Verona - Marco	351.4 km (218.3 mi)	TN
Lizzana - forte Pozzacchio - campana dei Caduti - Santa Maria del Carmine Hospital in Rovereto -; Trento - historic center - Museum of Modern and Contemporary Art of Trento and Rovereto - - Leno stream; shopping centers - Verona - Riva del Garda - Brentonico - Mori - A22 -	351.8 km (218.6 mi)	TN
Borgo Sacco Destra Adige - Isera -	352.7 km (219.2 mi)	TN
'del Pasubio - Vallarsa - Santa Maria del Carmine Hospital in Rovereto - Lizzanella - campana dei Caduti - Trento - historic center - Museum of Modern and Contemporary Art of Trento and Rovereto - - Mechatronics hub - Verona - Riva del Garda - Autostrada - Rovereto -	353.1 km (219.4 mi)	TN
Rovereto		TN
Via Maioliche	353.3 km (219.5 mi)	TN
Stream Leno	353.5 km (219.7 mi)	TN
Rest area	353.7 km (219.8 mi)	TN
Borgo Sacco - San Giorgio - Isera - historic center -; Trento - Autostrada - MART - - Verona - Riva del Garda - del Pasubio - Vallarsa - Santa Maria del Carmine Hospital in Rovereto	353.8 km (219.8 mi)	TN
Noriglio - Terragnolo - Serrada - Mount Finonchio -; Trento - Folgaria - Autostrada - Museum of modern and contemporary art of Trento and Rovereto - Riccardo Zandonai municipal theatre - - Verona - Riva del Garda - Vallarsa -	354.3 km (220.2 mi)	TN
Rovereto railway station	354.4 km (220.2 mi)	TN
Via Parteli	355.1 km (220.6 mi)	TN
Destra Adige - Villa Lagarina - Autostrada A22 Adige river - Museum of modern and contemporary art of Trento and Rovereto - San Giorgio - Quercia Stadium	355.4 km (220.8 mi)	TN
Rest area	356.1 km (221.3 mi)	TN
Brione - Museum of modern and contemporary art of Trento and Rovereto - Riccardo Zandonai municipal theatre - Sports hall -	356.2 km (221.3 mi)	TN
Trento - Volano - Folgaria; Via XIII Settembre; Verona - Riva del Garda - Vallarsa - Autostrada A22 -	356.4 km (221.5 mi)	TN
Rest area	356.6 km (221.6 mi)	TN
Sant'Ilario di Rovereto		TN
Volano - Commercial area - Parking	358.2 km (222.6 mi)	TN
Volano - playground - schools - sports center -	359 km (223 mi)	TN
Rest area	359.1 km (223.1 mi)	TN
Volano - Moietto - Hermitage of Santa Cecilia - Church of San Rocco - Industrial area	359.1 km (223.1 mi)	TN
Località Fornaci	360.7 km (224.1 mi)	TN
Località Marocchi - path Hermitage of Santa Cecilia	360.9 km (224.3 mi)	TN
Castel Pietra	361.3 km (224.5 mi)	TN
Rest area	361.8 km (224.8 mi)	TN
Calliano		TN
Calliano - Nomi	362 km (225 mi)	TN
di Folgaria e di Val d'Astico - Folgaria - Vicenza Folgaria plateau - Lavarone Lake	362.4 km (225.2 mi)	TN
Calliano - pharmacy	362.6 km (225.3 mi)	TN
Besenello - Castel Beseno	362.7 km (225.4 mi)	TN
Calliano -	363 km (226 mi)	TN
Besenello - Castel Beseno	364.3 km (226.4 mi)	TN
Rio Secco	364.7 km (226.6 mi)	TN
Mattarello - Acquaviva - artisan area - Cycle path	367.8 km (228.5 mi)	TN
Southern ring road of Trento	-	TN
Western ring road of Trento	-	TN
Mezzolombardo - Northern ring road of Trento Brennero-Modena - Trento Interport dell'Abetone e del Brennero - Bolzano - Lavis della Val di Non - Non Valley - Val di Sole	381.7 km (237.2 mi)	TN
Viaduct of Canova	382.2 km (237.5 mi)	TN
Trento nord	382.7 km (237.8 mi)	TN
dell'Abetone e del Brennero - Gardolo della Valsugana - Padova - Trento est	383 km (238 mi)	TN
Verona - Trento - Gardesana Occidentale - Riva del Garda Brennero-Modena - Trento Interport - Santa Chiara Hospital in Trento - Museo delle Scienze - ParkingTrento nord - della Valsugana - Padova - Trento est	383 km (238 mi)	TN
Rest area	383.2 km (238.1 mi)	TN
Via Avisio	383.3 km (238.2 mi)	TN
Via Noce	383.4 km (238.2 mi)	TN
Via Talvera	383.5 km (238.3 mi)	TN
GardoloRoncafort - Canova -	383.7 km (238.4 mi)	TN
Rest area	384.5 km (238.9 mi)	TN
Gardolo; Gardolo di Mezzo - Meano - Albiano - Santa Colomba Lake e Lases Lake - Segonzano - Bolzano - Lavis - Brennero-Modena; artisan area Gardolo - Trento	384.6 km (239.0 mi)	TN
Spini di Gardolo Brennero-Modena	385 km (239 mi)	TN
Lamar Dos Road	385.7 km (239.7 mi)	TN
Meano - San Lazzaro di Meano - Albiano - Giardino Ciucioi; Bolzano - Lavis - della Val di Cembra - Cembra; Trento - Gardolo	386.5 km (240.2 mi)	TN
Avisio stream	386.6 km (240.2 mi)	TN
Lavis		TN
Pressano - della Val di Cembra - Cembra - Giardino Ciucioi - Santo; Bolzano - Trento - Brennero-Modena; Giaroni - Cimitero -; Gardolo - Lavis	387.3 km (240.7 mi)	TN
Lavis - della Val di Cembra - Cembra - Giardino Ciucioi - Gardolo; Bolzano - Brennero; Zambana - Zarga; Trento - Val di Non - Val di Sole - Modena - Aicheri - Ospli - Giaroni	387.8 km (241.0 mi)	TN
Rest area	388 km (241 mi)	TN
Lavis railway station	389 km (242 mi)	TN
Bolzano - Brennero; Zambana railway station; Trento - Lavis - Modena - Lavis railway station	389.5 km (242.0 mi)	TN
Rest area	390 km (240 mi)	TN
Nave San Felice		TN
Nave San Rocco - Mezzolombardo - Cycle path	391.5 km (243.3 mi)	TN
Rest area	391.7 km (243.4 mi)	TN
Bolzano - Brennero-Modena; Sorni; Trento - Lavis	392.6 km (244.0 mi)	TN
Via Toresela	392.9 km (244.1 mi)	TN
San Michele all'Adige	393.3 km (244.4 mi)	TN
Rest area	394.2 km (244.9 mi)	TN
San Michele all'Adige	394.4 km (245.1 mi)	TN
Faedo - San Michele museum - San Michele all'Adige	395 km (245 mi)	TN
Grumo - Mezzocorona - Mezzolombardo - Brennero-Modena Val di Non - Val di Sole	395.1 km (245.5 mi)	TN
San Michele all'Adige	395.4 km (245.7 mi)	TN
Destra Adige - Mezzocorona - Roveré della Luna - Cycle path	396.5 km (246.4 mi)	TN
San Michele all'Adige	397 km (247 mi)	TN
Monreale castle	398.2 km (247.4 mi)	TN
Cadino		TN
Bolzano - Salorno; biodigester; Trento - San Michele all'Adige - Brennero-Modena	399.6 km (248.3 mi)	TN
Provincial border Trento - Bolzano	401.3 km (249.4 mi)	TN/BZ
Industrial area	403.4 km (250.7 mi)	BZ
Parking ; Salorno; Bolzano - Egna - Autostrada Trento	403.7 km (250.8 mi)	BZ
Salorno		BZ

== See also ==
- State highways (Italy)
- Roads in Italy
- Transport in Italy

=== Other Italian roads ===
- Autostrade of Italy
- Regional road (Italy)
- Provincial road (Italy)
- Municipal road (Italy)
