= Altopiano della Vigolana =

- Comune
- Comune di Altopiano della Vigolana
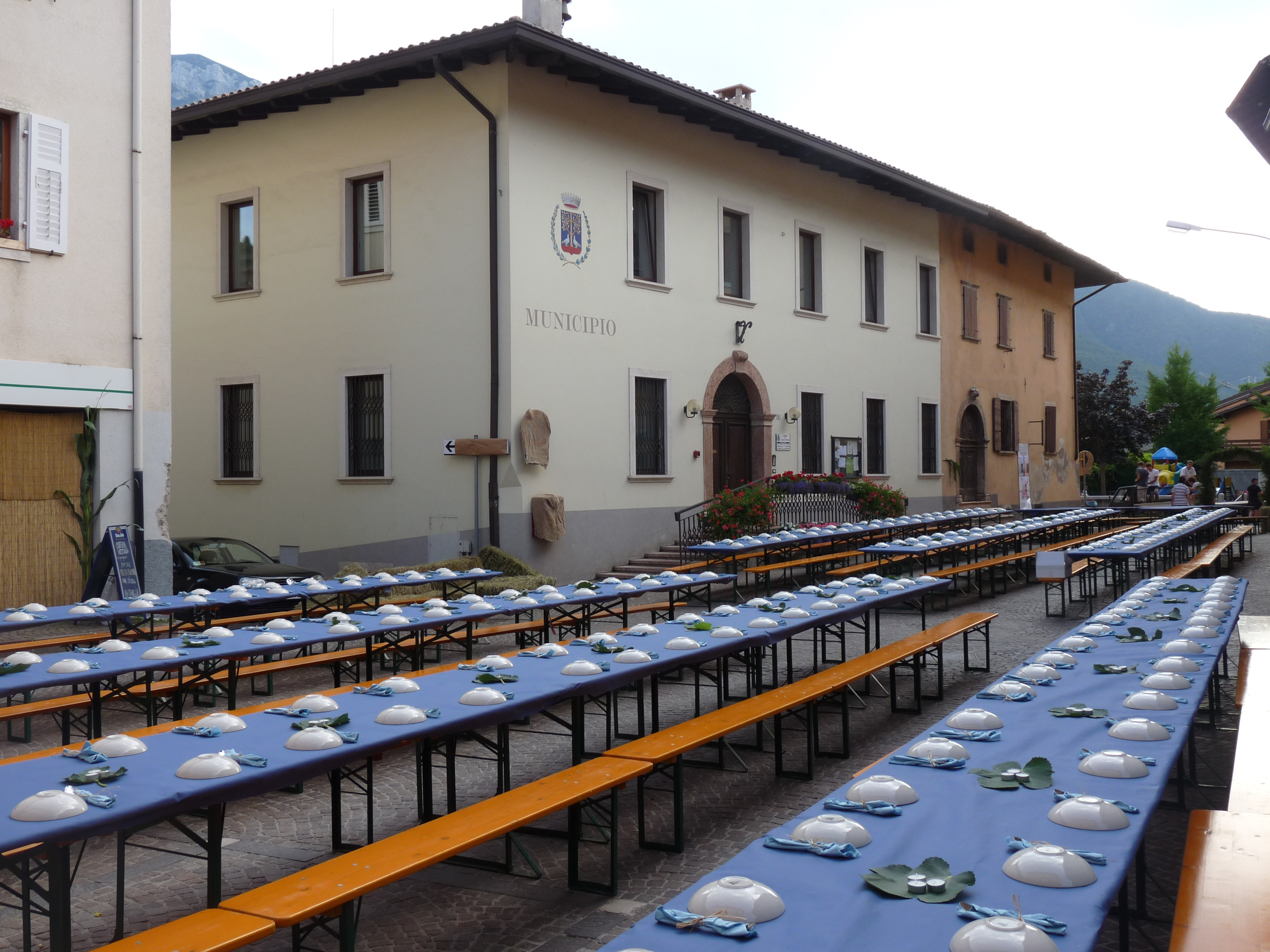
- The town hall, in Vigolo Vattaro.

- Location of Altopiano della Vigolana in Italy Altopiano della Vigolana (Trentino-Alto Adige/Südtirol)
- Coordinates: 45°56′35″N 10°38′29″E
- Country: Italy
- Region: Trentino-Alto Adige/Südtirol
- Province: Trentino (TN)
- Frazioni: Bosentino, Campregheri, Centa San Nicolò, Frisanchi, Migazzone, Pian dei Pradi, Valle, Vattaro, Vigolo Vattaro (communal seat)

Government
  - Mayor: Paolo Zanlucchi

Area
  - Total: 45.03 km^{2} (17.39 sq mi)
- Elevation: 725 m (2,379 ft)

Population (2026)
  - Total: 5,201
  - Density: 115.5/km^{2} (299.1/sq mi)
- Demonym: Alto-Vigolani
- Time zone: UTC+1 (CET)
  - Summer (DST): UTC+2 (CEST)
- Postal code: 38085
- Dialing code: 0465
- Website: Official website

Altopiano della Vigolana is a comune (municipality) in Trentino in the northern Italian region Trentino-Alto Adige/Südtirol, located about 20 kilometres (12 mi) south-east of Trento. It was formed on 1 January 2016 as the merger of the previous Municipalities of Bosentino, Centa San Nicolò, Vattaro and Vigolo Vattaro.
