= Francesco Zantedeschi =

Italian physicist (1797–1873)

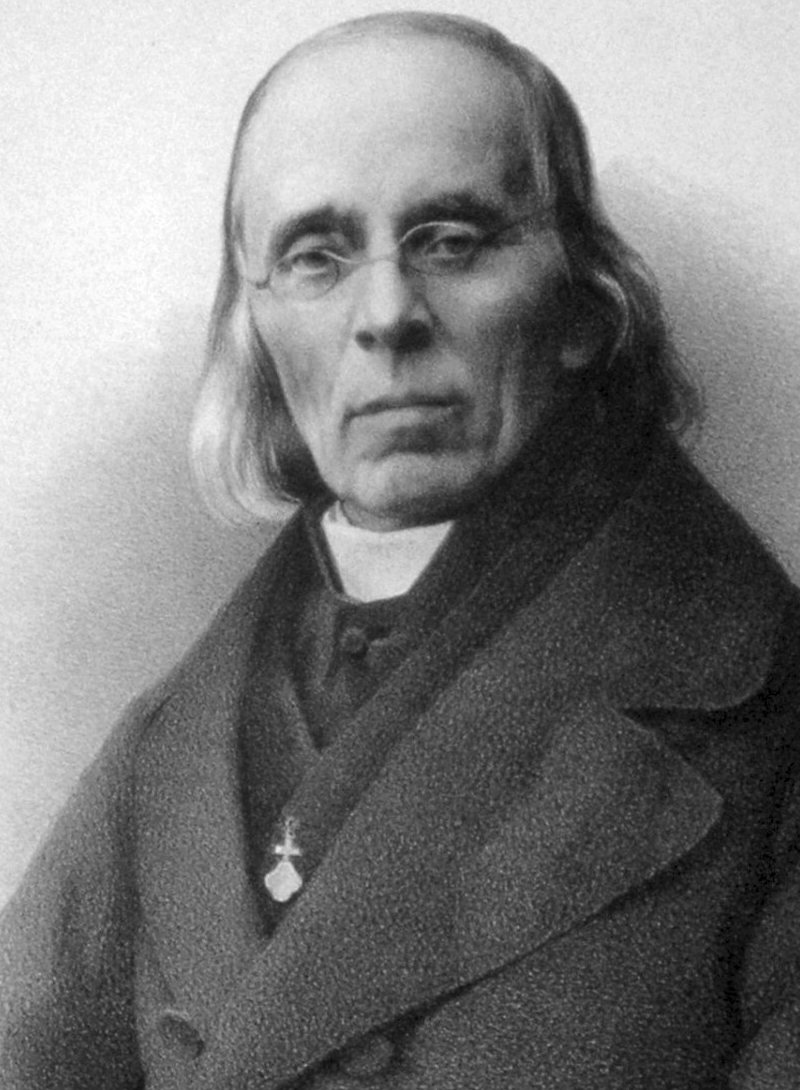
- Born: 20 August 1797; Dolcè, near Verona
- Died: 29 March 1873 (aged 75); Padua

Francesco Zantedeschi (August 20, 1797 – March 29, 1873) was an Italian Catholic priest and physicist.

== Biography ==
A native of Dolcè, near Verona, Zantedeschi was for some time professor of physics and philosophy in the Liceo of Venice. Later he accepted the chair of physics in the University of Padua, which he held until 1853 being then obliged to resign on account of failing sight. He was an ardent worker and prolific writer, 325 memoirs and communications appearing under his name in the Biblioteca Italiana and the Bibliothèque universelle de Genève.

Zantedeschi died at Padua in 1873.

== Scientific work ==
In 1829 and again in 1830, Zantedeschi published papers on the production of electric currents in closed circuits by the approach and withdrawal of a magnet, thereby anticipating Michael Faraday's classical experiments of 1831.

While carrying out researches on the solar spectrum, Zantedeschi was among the first to recognize the marked absorption by the atmosphere of red, yellow, and green light.

He also thought that he had detected, in 1838, a magnetic action on steel needles by ultraviolet light. Though this effect was not confirmed, a connection between light and magnetism was suspected so many years before the announcement in 1867 by James Clerk Maxwell of the electromagnetic theory of light.

In a tract of 16 pages, published in 1859, Zantedeschi defended the claims of Gian Domenico Romagnosi to the discovery in 1802 of the magnetic effect of the electric current, a discovery which is usually accredited to Hans Christian Ørsted in 1820. Zantedeschi's experiments and papers on the repulsion of flames by a strong magnetic field (discovered by Michele Alberto Bancalari of the Pious Schools in 1847) attracted general attention at the time.

In 1851, Zantedeschi was elected as a member of the American Philosophical Society.

In his later years Zantedeschi dictated an autobiography which is kept in the archives of the Academy of Verona. His principal works are: Ricerche sul termo-elettricismo dinamico (1838) and Trattato del Magnetismo e della Elettricità (1843).

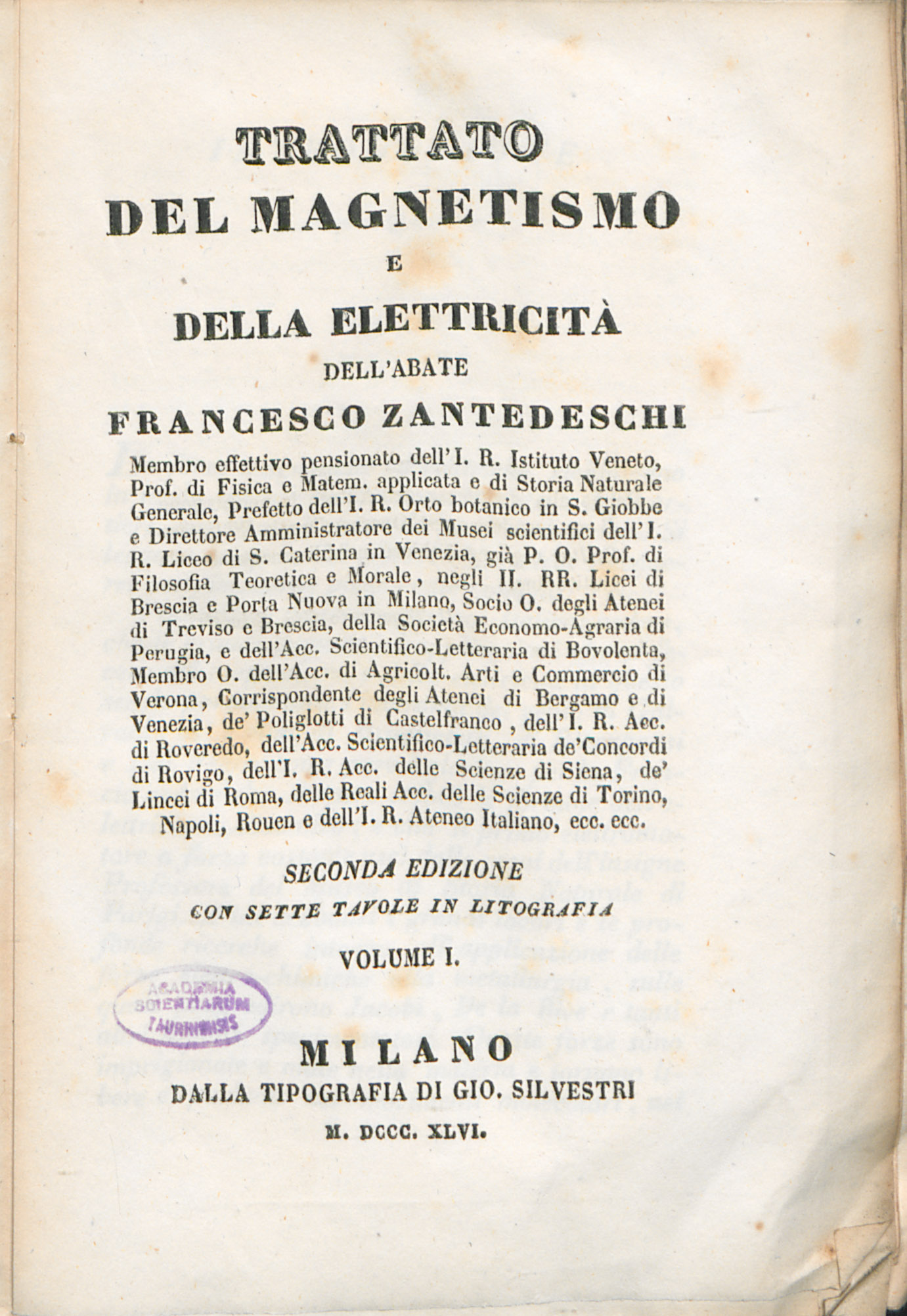
Trattato del magnetismo e della elettricità

== Works ==
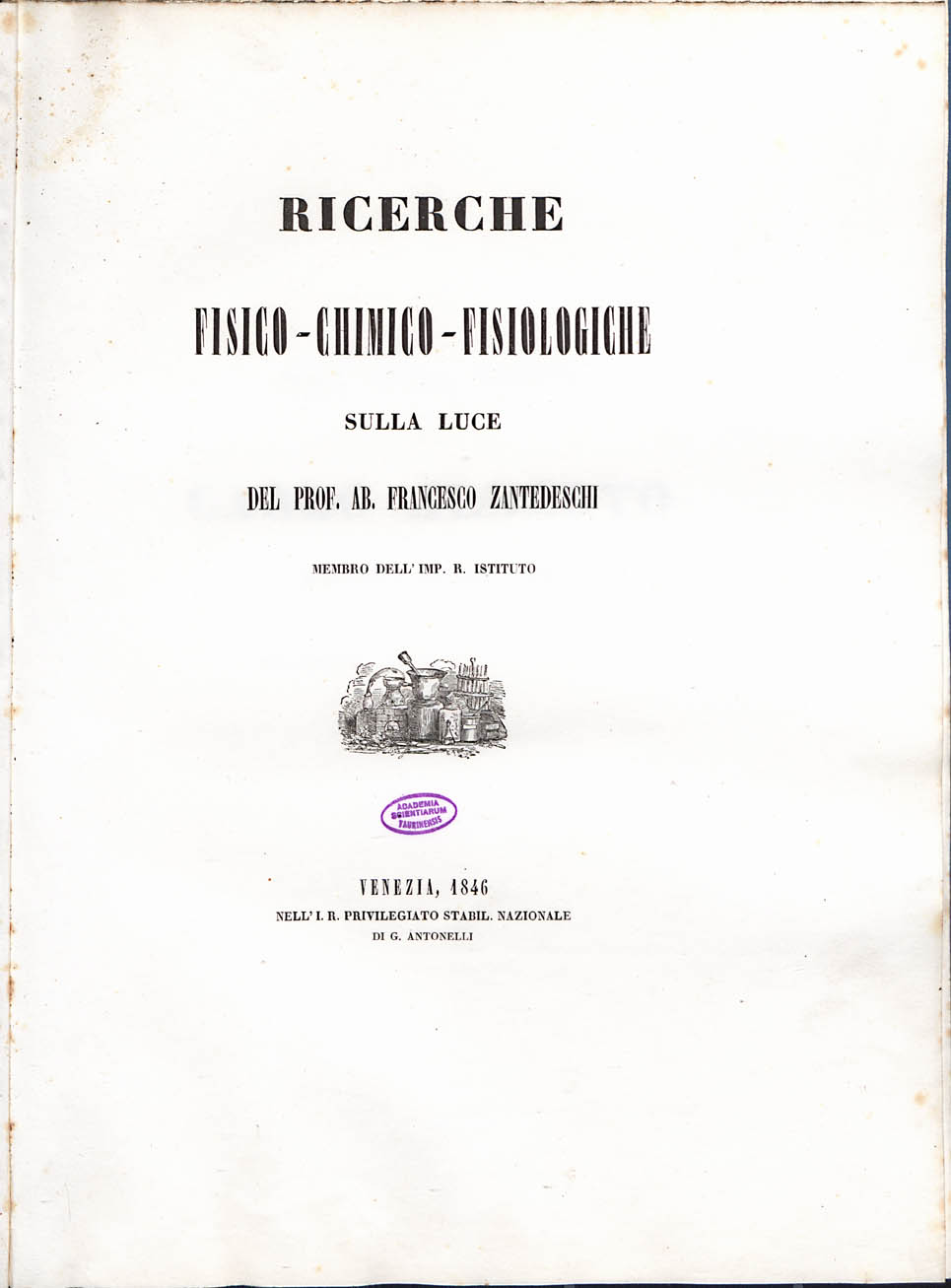
Ricerche fisico-chimico-fisiologiche sulla luce, 1846

- Trattato del calorico e della luce (in Italian). Venezia: Tipografia Armena di S. Lazzaro. 1846.
- Ricerche fisico-chimico-fisiologiche sulla luce (in Italian). Venezia: Giuseppe Antonelli. 1846.
- Trattato del magnetismo e della elettricità (in Italian). Vol. 1. Milano: Giovanni Silvestri. 1846.
- Trattato del magnetismo e della elettricità (in Italian). Vol. 2. Milano: Giovanni Silvestri. 1846.

== See also ==
- List of Roman Catholic scientist-clerics

== Sources ==
- Tinazzi, Massimo. "The Contribution Of Francesco Zantedeschi At The Development Of The Experimental Laboratory Of Physics Faculty Of The Padua University" (PDF). Istituto di Fisica Generale Applicata Università degli Studi di Milano. Archived from the original (PDF) on 2008-02-29.
- Canov, Michael (1 September 2003). "Francesco Zantedeschi". Gymnázium & SOŠPg Liberec Jeronýmova, příspěvková organizace. Archived from the original on 2007-09-27.
- "Francesco Zantedeschi at TODAY IN SCIENCE HISTORY March 29th deaths". Today in Science History.
