= Brussa ferro =

Austro-Hungarian artillery battery near Trento, Trentino, Italy

Brusafer Battery, sometimes known as Brusaferro Battery, is an Austro-Hungarian artillery battery built between 1878 and 1880. Brusafer is located on the Monte Marzola Massif. The battery had the function of defending the communication route from Trento to the Altopiano della Vigolana. The battery and its twin Doss Fornas had the job of denying entry to Trento from the hamlet of Vigolo Vattaro, just to the south. The battery and its twin are closely connected to the Mattarello works. Created by 2 angles on the battery, a caponier was built for close defense. The battery had numerous slits and housings for rifles along the walls. The grounds were used to house both light and heavy artillery.

At first the planned weaponry was 4 12 cm M61 fortress guns, this was not implemented however, and the fort was instead armed with 6 12 cm M61 K fortress guns and 2 9 cm M75 F.K field guns for close defense. 4 of the 6 12 cm guns were facing towards Vigolo Vattaro, while 2 were facing towards the Adige Valley. Only in more modern times was the battery armed with a revolving 37mm turret. In 1898, a swiveling armored observation dome was added.

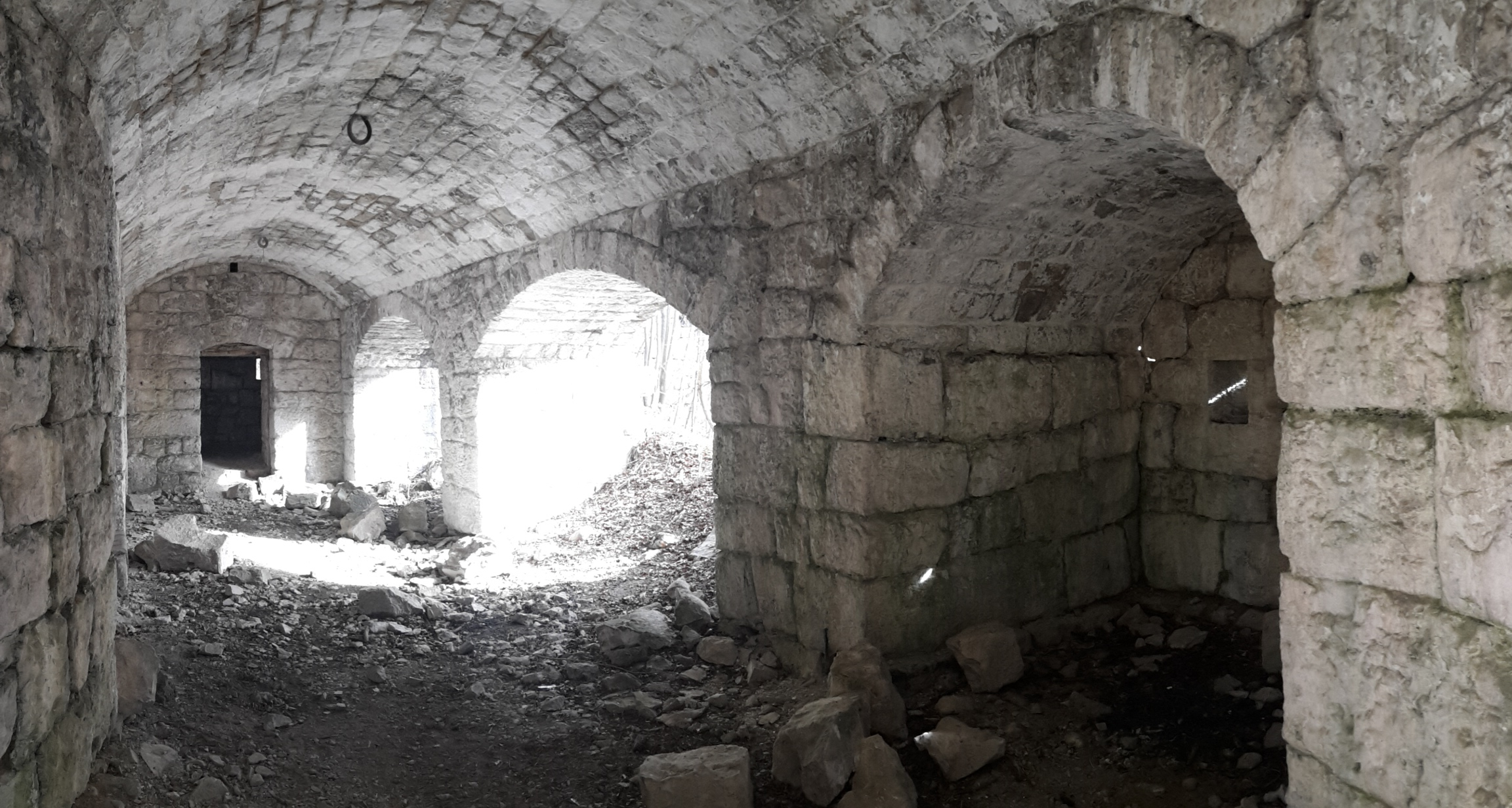
The casemate block where the big guns were located.

== World War I ==
As with most 19th-century fortifications built around Trento, the Brusafer battery was disarmed in the summer of 1915. The battery's guns were moved elsewhere, most likely to active fronts.

== Post-war ==
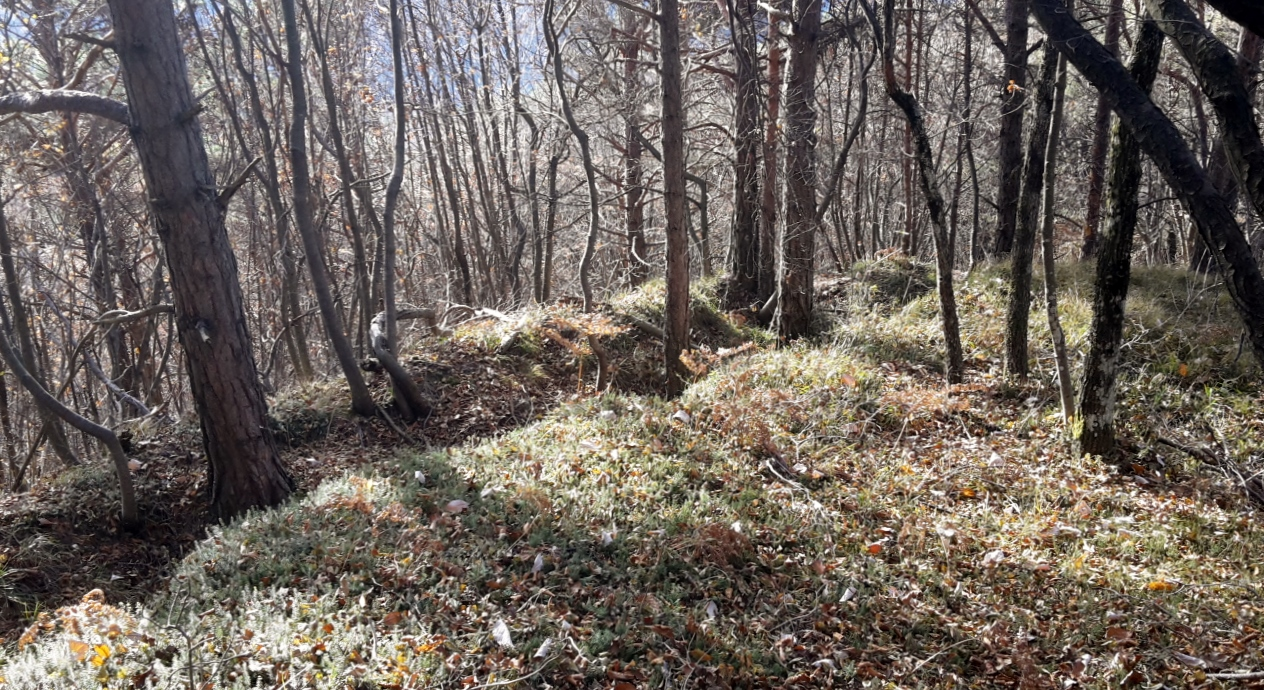
What remains of a trench left over from the First World War.

Today the battery lies in ruins, discharged from the Royal Italian Army on March 7, 1929. Currently, it is on private land and is not open to the public.
