= Doss Fornas =

Austro-Hungarian artillery fortification in the Trentino, Italy

Coordinates: 46°00′03″N 11°09′39″E

The Doss Fornas battery (Italian: Batteria Doss Fornas, German: Batterie Doss Fornas) was built between 1878-80, opposite the Brussa ferro battery in Valsorda. The battery was one of the last fortifications built in the “Trentino-style”. Doss Fornas was built with stone that could be found nearby, like most Trentino-style fortifications. The battery was defended by rifles and machine guns. Doss Fornas was originally armed with 4 12cm M61 K fortress guns, but ended up with an observation turret and 8 15cm M78 guns that could shoot in the direction of Vigolo Vattaro. In 1898, an armored rotating observation dome was added.

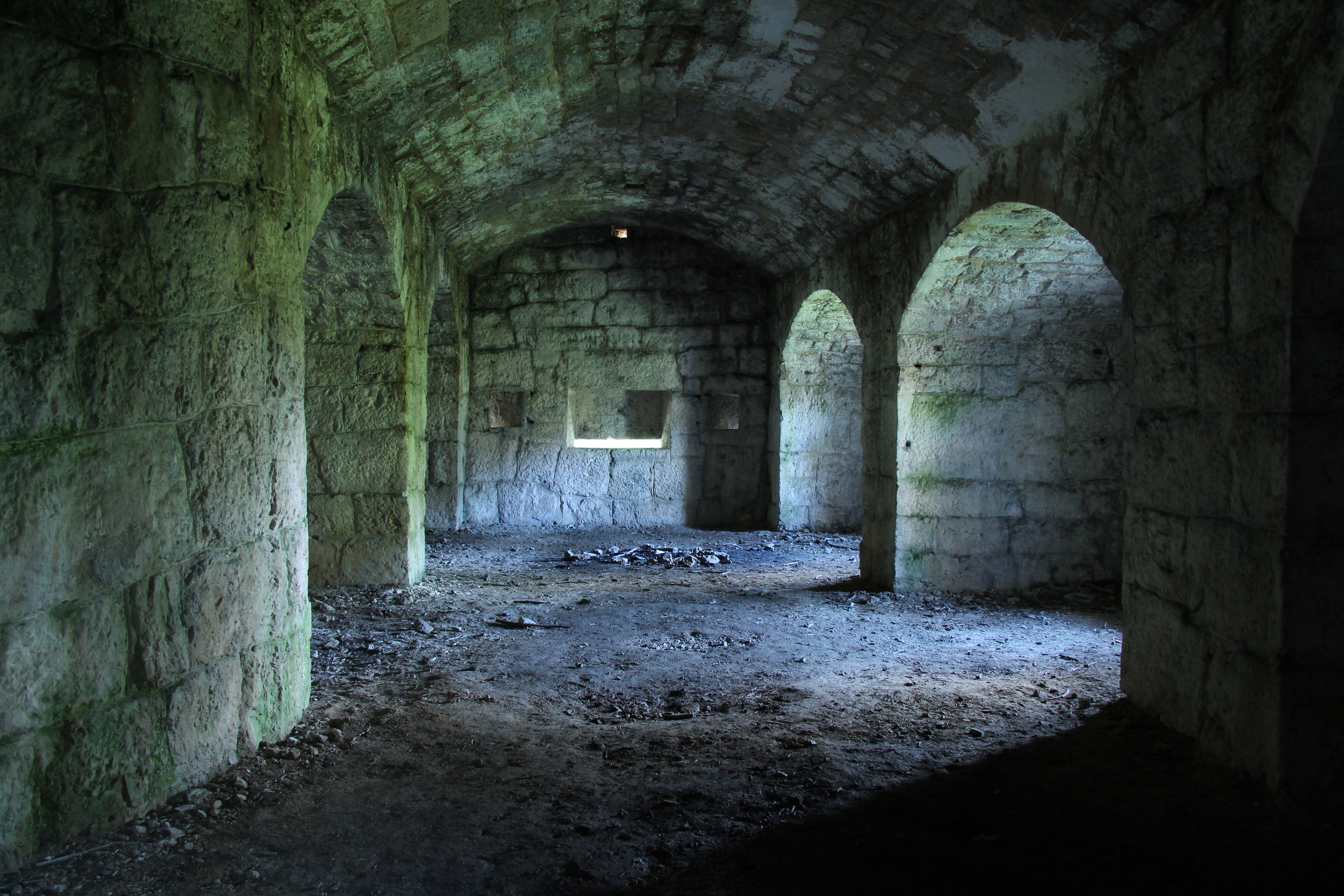
The interior of the casemate block where the guns were housed.

== World War I ==
Like most fortifications nearby, the battery was obsolete by 1915, and was disarmed in the summer of 1915.

== Post-war ==
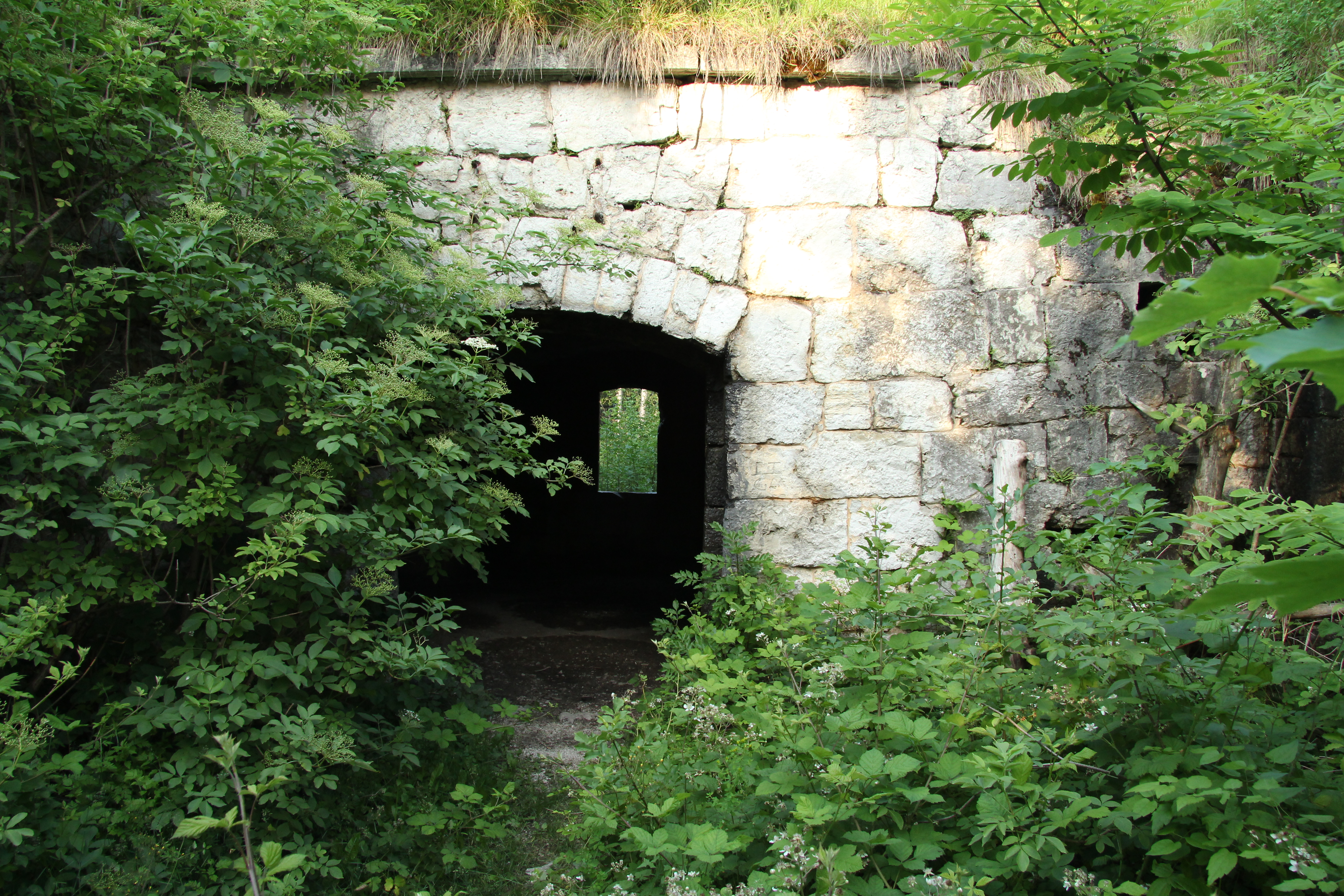
Today Doss Fornas lies abandoned, slowly being consumed by the forest and deteriorating.

On Mar. 7, 1929, the fort was sold into private hands, which is where it remains today. The battery is not available to visit and is not restored.
