= Calceranica al Lago =

- Comune
- Comune di Calceranica al Lago
- Coat of arms

- Location within Italy Location within Trentino-Alto Adige/Südtirol
- Coordinates: 46°0′13″N 11°14′33″E
- Country: Italy
- Region: Trentino-Alto Adige/Südtirol
- Province: Trentino (TN)

Government
  - Mayor: Gianni Marzi

Area
  - Total: 3.4 km^{2} (1.3 sq mi)

Population (2026)
  - Total: 1,397
  - Density: 410/km^{2} (1,100/sq mi)
- Time zone: UTC+1 (CET)
  - Summer (DST): UTC+2 (CEST)
- Postal code: 38050
- Dialing code: 0461
- Website: Official website

Calceranica al Lago (Calzerànega in local dialect) is a comune (municipality) in Trentino in the northern Italian region Trentino-Alto Adige/Südtirol, located about 9 kilometres (6 mi) east of Trento. As of 31 December 2004, it had a population of 1,209 and an area of 3.4 square kilometres (1.3 mi^{2}).

Calceranica al Lago borders the following municipalities: Pergine Valsugana, Bosentino, Caldonazzo, Vattaro, and Centa San Nicolò.

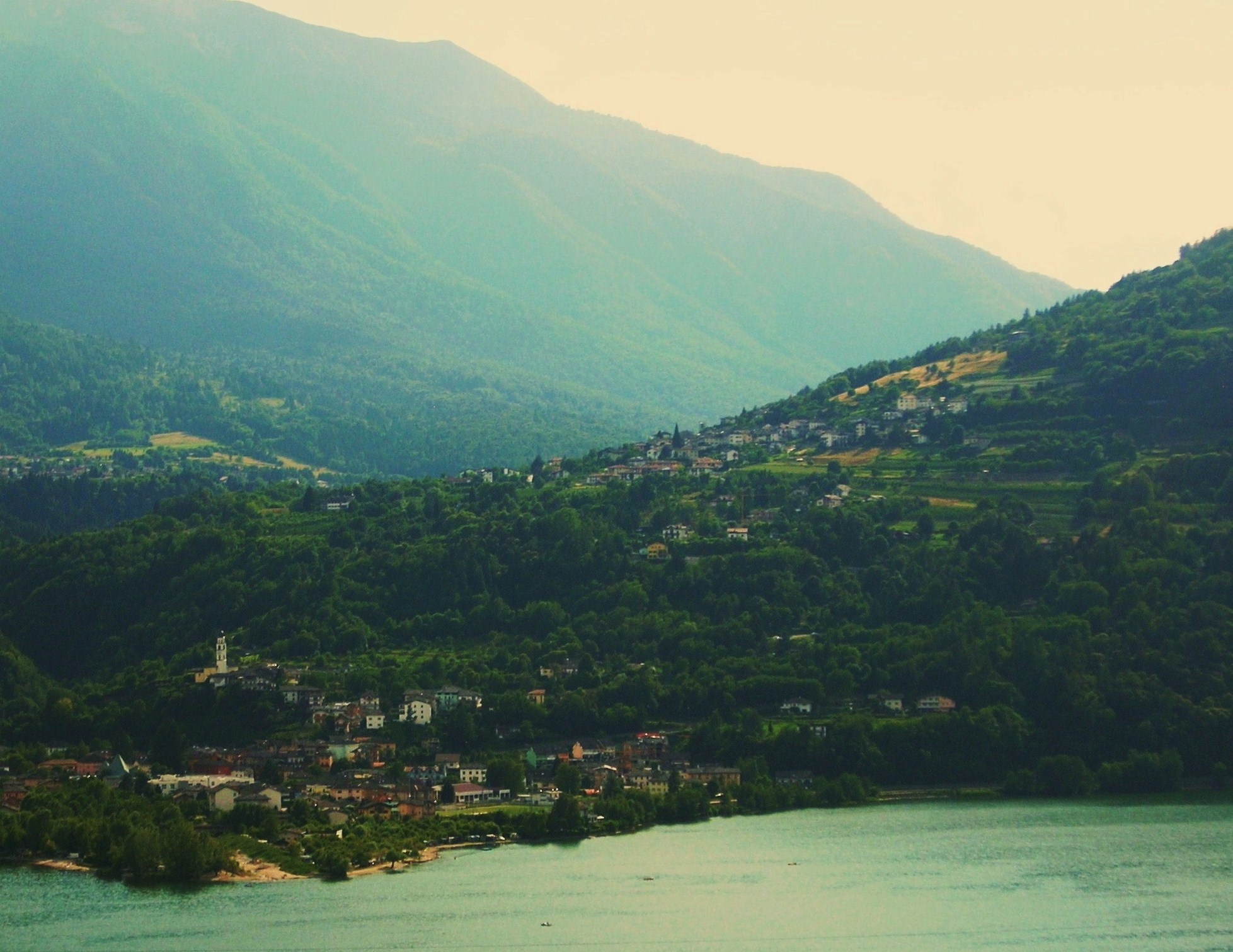
Aerial view of Calceranica al Lago

== Demographic evolution ==
Historical population

Year	Pop.	±%
1861	?	—
1871	?	—
1881	?	—
1901	?	—
1911	?	—

Year	Pop.	±%
1921	628	—
1931	692	+10.2%
1936	714	+3.2%
1951	839	+17.5%
1961	1,019	+21.5%

Year	Pop.	±%
1971	941	−7.7%
1981	988	+5.0%
1991	1,056	+6.9%
2001	1,145	+8.4%

Source: Data from ISTAT
