= Leno (stream) =

Stream in the province of Trento, Italy

The Leno (German Leimbach) is the last of the main tributaries of the Adige river, at a confluence on its left bank near the town of Rovereto. It is actually formed of 2 water-courses:

- the Leno of Vallarsa (what is properly called the Leno)
- the Leno of Terragnolo, flowing to the left of the main branch, with which it joins a short distance upstream from the settlement of Rovereto, near the comune of Trambileno.

The Leno's basin is solely in Trentino, and passes through the communes of Vallarsa, Terragnolo, Trambileno and Rovereto.
