= Volano =

- Comune
- Comune di Volano
- Location within Italy Location within Trentino-Alto Adige/Südtirol
- Coordinates: 45°55′N 11°4′E
- Country: Italy
- Region: Trentino-Alto Adige/Südtirol
- Province: Trentino (TN)

Government
  - Mayor: Emanuele Volani

Area
  - Total: 10.8 km^{2} (4.2 sq mi)

Population (Dec. 2004)
  - Total: 2,851
  - Density: 264/km^{2} (684/sq mi)
- Demonym: Volanesi
- Time zone: UTC+1 (CET)
  - Summer (DST): UTC+2 (CEST)
- Postal code: 38060
- Dialing code: 0464
- Website: Official website

Volano is a comune (municipality) in Trentino in the northern Italian region Trentino-Alto Adige/Südtirol, located about 15 kilometres (9 mi) south of Trento. As of 31 December 2004, it had a population of 2,851 and an area of 10.8 square kilometres (4.2 mi^{2}).

Volano borders the following municipalities: Calliano, Pomarolo, Nomi and Rovereto.

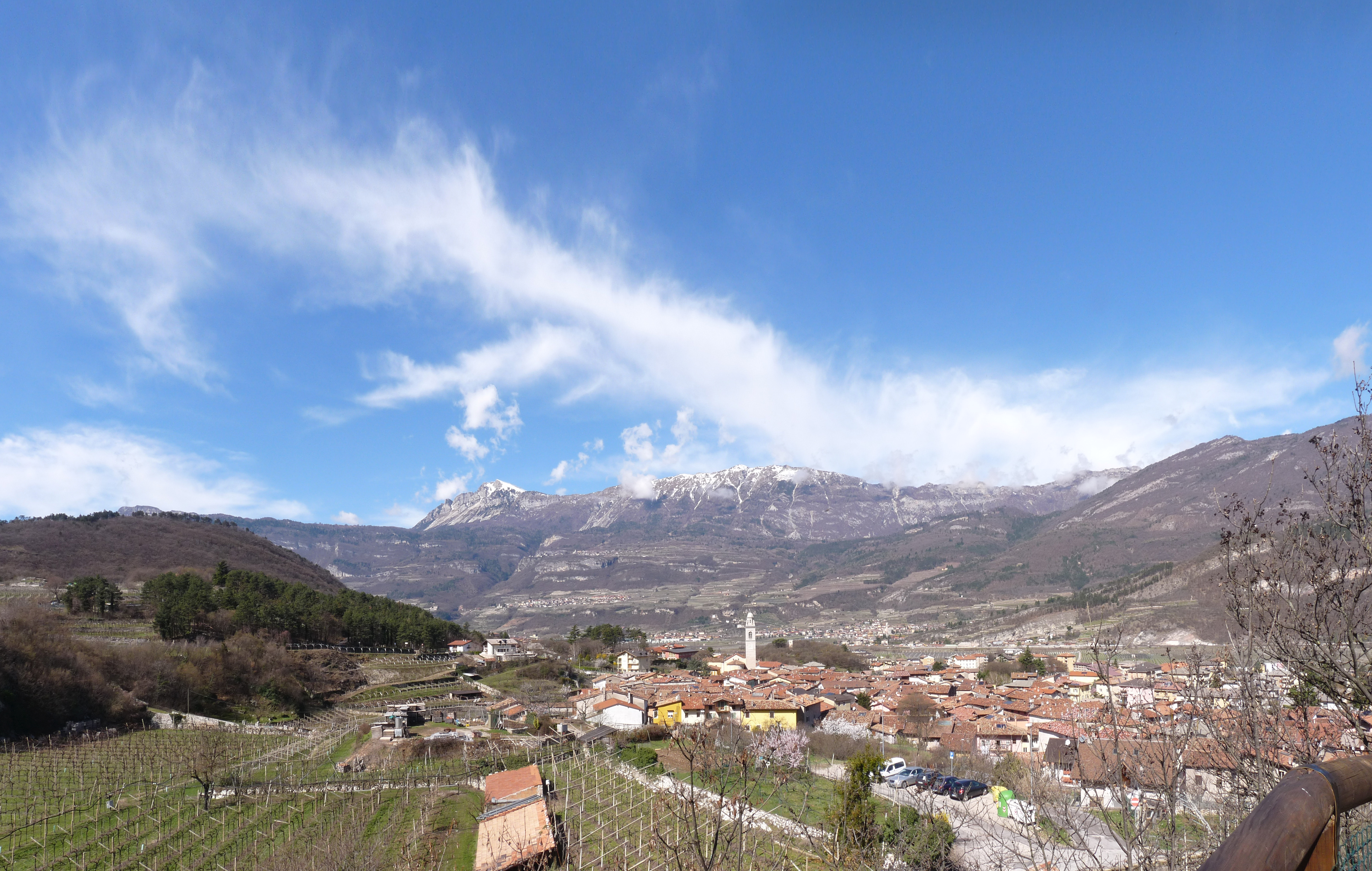
View of the town of Volano

== Demographic evolution ==
Historical population

Year	Pop.	±%
1861	?	—
1871	?	—
1881	?	—
1901	?	—
1911	?	—

Year	Pop.	±%
1921	1,745	—
1931	1,761	+0.9%
1936	1,798	+2.1%
1951	1,957	+8.8%
1961	2,062	+5.4%

Year	Pop.	±%
1971	2,420	+17.4%
1981	2,448	+1.2%
1991	2,470	+0.9%
2001	2,801	+13.4%

Source: Data from ISTAT

== Bibliography ==
- Saverio Ferrari (September 29, 2004). L'Oratorio della Confraternita del SS. Sacramento (Chiesetta della Santissima Trinità) di Volano : vicende storiche, interventi di restauro, guida teologico-artistica (in Italian). Roman Catholic parish of Volano. p. 42. OCLC 799121609. (For the translation of the sculpture of the Blessed Virgin Mary with the Saint Archangels)
