= Nomi, Trentino =

Nomi
- Comune
- Comune di Nomi
- Location within Italy Location within Trentino-Alto Adige/Südtirol
- Coordinates: 45°56′N 11°4′E
- Country: Italy
- Region: Trentino-Alto Adige/Südtirol
- Province: Trentino (TN)

Government
  - Mayor: Alessandro Riolfatti

Area
  - Total: 6.5 km^{2} (2.5 sq mi)

Population (2026)
  - Total: 1,360
  - Density: 210/km^{2} (540/sq mi)
- Time zone: UTC+1 (CET)
  - Summer (DST): UTC+2 (CEST)
- Postal code: 38060
- Dialing code: 0464
- Website: Official website

Nomi is a comune (municipality) in Trentino in the northern Italian region Trentino-Alto Adige/Südtirol, located about 15 kilometres (9 mi) south of Trento. As of 31 December 2004, it had a population of 1,298 and an area of 6.5 square kilometres (2.5 mi^{2}).

Nomi borders the following municipalities: Aldeno, Besenello, Calliano, Pomarolo and Volano.

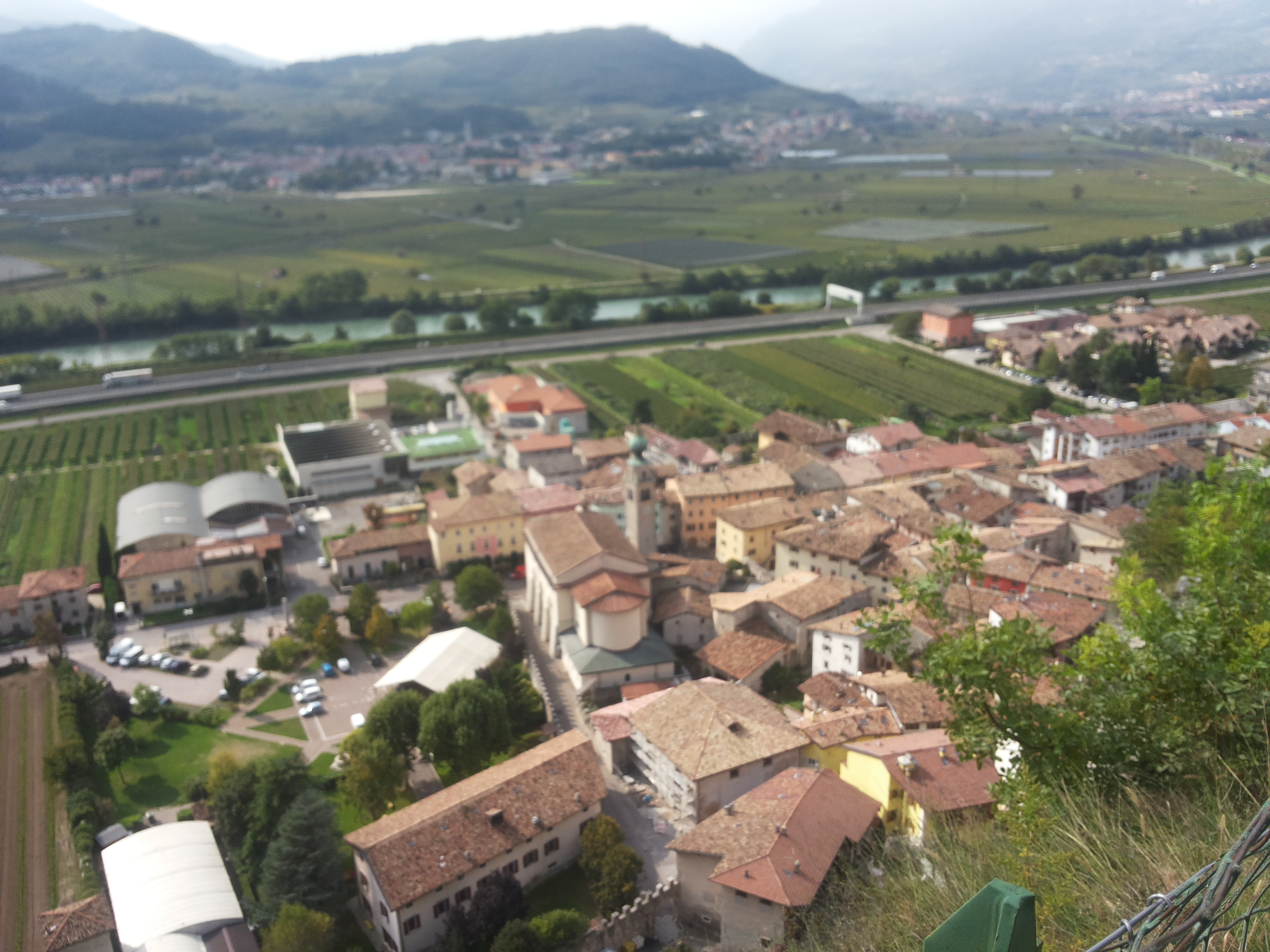
the town of Mori

== Demographic evolution ==
Historical population

Year	Pop.	±%
1861	?	—
1871	?	—
1881	?	—
1901	?	—
1911	?	—

Year	Pop.	±%
1921	1,068	—
1931	1,198	+12.2%
1936	1,268	+5.8%
1951	1,204	−5.0%
1961	1,208	+0.3%

Year	Pop.	±%
1971	1,194	−1.2%
1981	1,126	−5.7%
1991	1,126	+0.0%
2001	1,286	+14.2%

Source: Data from ISTAT
