= Calliano, Trentino =

Calliano
- Comune
- Comune di Calliano
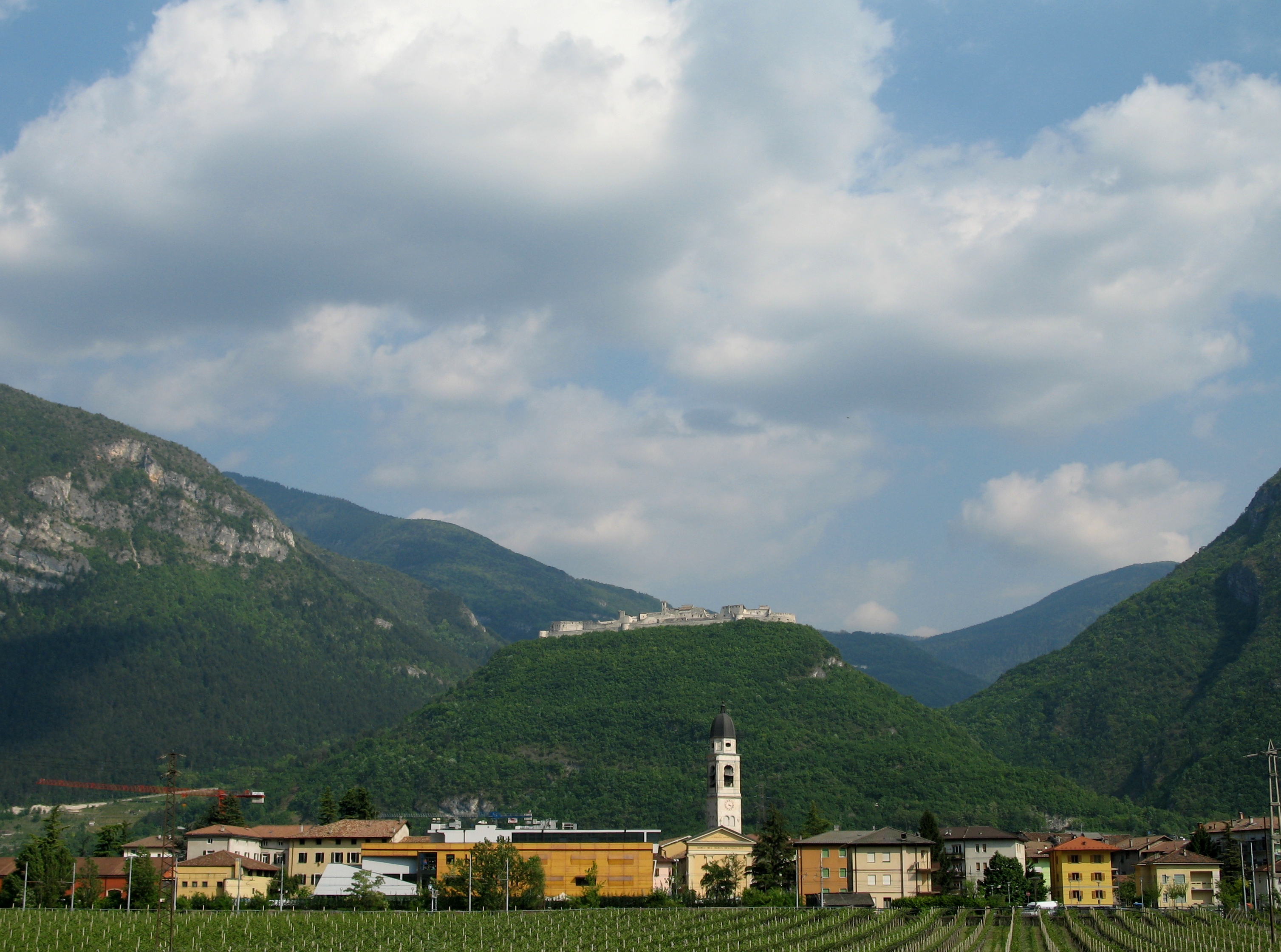

- Location within Italy Location within Trentino-Alto Adige/Südtirol
- Coordinates: 45°56′N 11°5′E
- Country: Italy
- Region: Trentino-Alto Adige/Südtirol
- Province: Trentino (TN)

Government
  - Mayor: Lorenzo Conci

Area
  - Total: 10.2 km^{2} (3.9 sq mi)
- Elevation: 187 m (614 ft)

Population (2026)
  - Total: 2,057
  - Density: 202/km^{2} (522/sq mi)
- Demonym: Callianoti
- Time zone: UTC+1 (CET)
  - Summer (DST): UTC+2 (CEST)
- Postal code: 38060
- Dialing code: 0464
- Website: Official website

Calliano (Caliam or Calian in local dialect) is a comune (municipality) in Trentino in the northern Italian region Trentino-Alto Adige/Südtirol, located about 15 kilometres (9 mi) south of Trento.

Calliano borders the following municipalities: Besenello, Nomi, Folgaria, Volano, and Rovereto.

== See also ==
- Battle of Calliano (1487), fought between Venetian and Austrian forces
- Battle of Calliano, fought 1796 between French and Austrian forces
