= Vattaro =

- Comune
- Comune di Vattaro
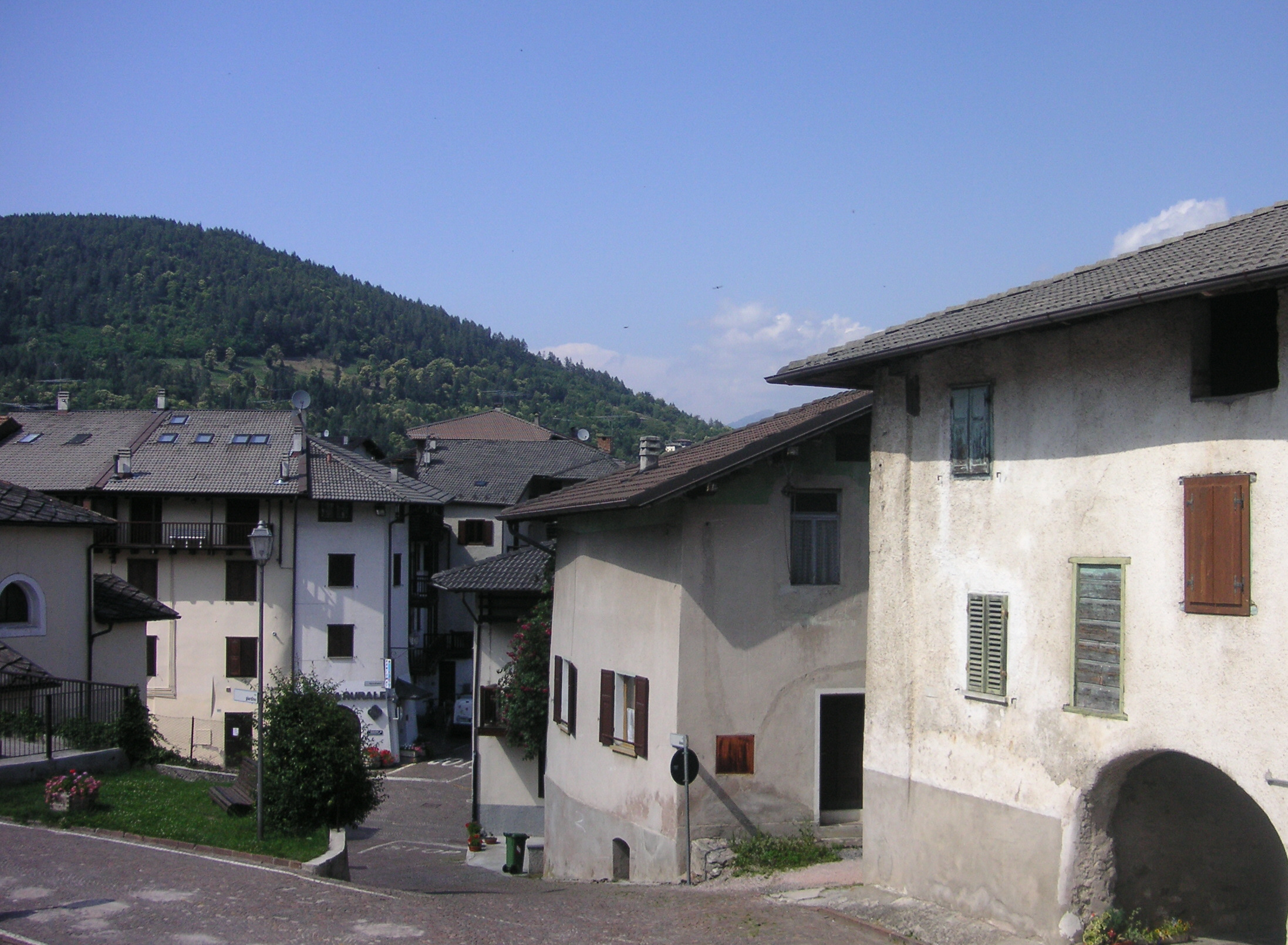

- Coat of arms

- Location within Italy Location within Trentino-Alto Adige/Südtirol
- Coordinates: 46°0′N 11°13′E
- Country: Italy
- Region: Trentino-Alto Adige/Südtirol
- Province: Trentino (TN)

Area
  - Total: 8.3 km^{2} (3.2 sq mi)

Population (Dec. 2004)
  - Total: 1,111
  - Density: 130/km^{2} (350/sq mi)
- Time zone: UTC+1 (CET)
  - Summer (DST): UTC+2 (CEST)
- Postal code: 38049
- Dialing code: 0461

Vattaro is a comune (municipality) in Trentino in the northern Italian region Trentino-Alto Adige/Südtirol, located about 11 kilometres (7 mi) southeast of Trento. As of 31 December 2004, it had a population of 1,111 and an area of 8.3 square kilometres (3.2 mi^{2}).

Vattaro borders the following municipalities: Bosentino, Calceranica al Lago, Centa San Nicolò and Besenello.

== Demographic evolution ==
Historical population

| Year | Pop. | ±% |
|---|---|---|
| 1861 | ? | — |
| 1871 | ? | — |
| 1881 | ? | — |
| 1901 | ? | — |
| 1911 | ? | — |

| Year | Pop. | ±% |
|---|---|---|
| 1921 | 595 | — |
| 1931 | 610 | +2.5% |
| 1936 | 548 | −10.2% |
| 1951 | 576 | +5.1% |
| 1961 | 653 | +13.4% |

| Year | Pop. | ±% |
|---|---|---|
| 1971 | 659 | +0.9% |
| 1981 | 734 | +11.4% |
| 1991 | 840 | +14.4% |
| 2001 | 1,024 | +21.9% |

Source: Data from ISTAT

== Notable people ==
- Luigi "Gigi" Weiss (born 1951), biathlete and ski mountaineer
