= Cadidavid =

Cadidavid Domus illorum de Davijs Cà di David Casa dei David Ca' di Dai Ca i Dai
- Municipality
- Interactive map of Cadidavid
- Country: Italy
- County: Veneto
- City: Verona
- First mention: 1921
- Incorporated into city: 1927

Population
  - Total: 13,899

Cadidavid is a borough in the municipality of Verona with 13899 inhabitants.

== History ==
The first mention of the village is found in 1251, as Domus illorum de Davijs and was an independent municipality until 1927 when it was included in the larger city of Verona, with the name Cà di David (Borgo Roma).

During the Middle Ages, the village is first called Ca' dei Davi (Domus Daviorum or House of Davi, the founding family). There are still two streets named in honour of the first inhabitants, Gerardo and Belobono.

Later, in the 15th century, a "d" is added in the end and the village is then called Cà di David ( Casa dei David), but the original spelling was also used until 1792. Even today, however, the village is still called Ca' di Dai (or Ca i Dai) in Venetian dialect / language.

== Notable people ==
Famous persons from Cadidavid are:

- Luciano Albertini, painter ( 1910 - 1985)
- Aldo Sala, Mayor of Verona 1990 - 1993
