= Michele Alberto Bancalari =

Italian physicist

Michele Alberto Bancalari (1805–1864) was professor of natural philosophy at the University of Genoa. In 1847, he discovered that flames were diamagnetic by showing that there were repulsed by a strong magnetic field.
