= Mattarello works =

3-tiered Austro-Hungarian fortification near Trento, Trentino, Italy

Coordinates: 45.9986°N 11.1313°E

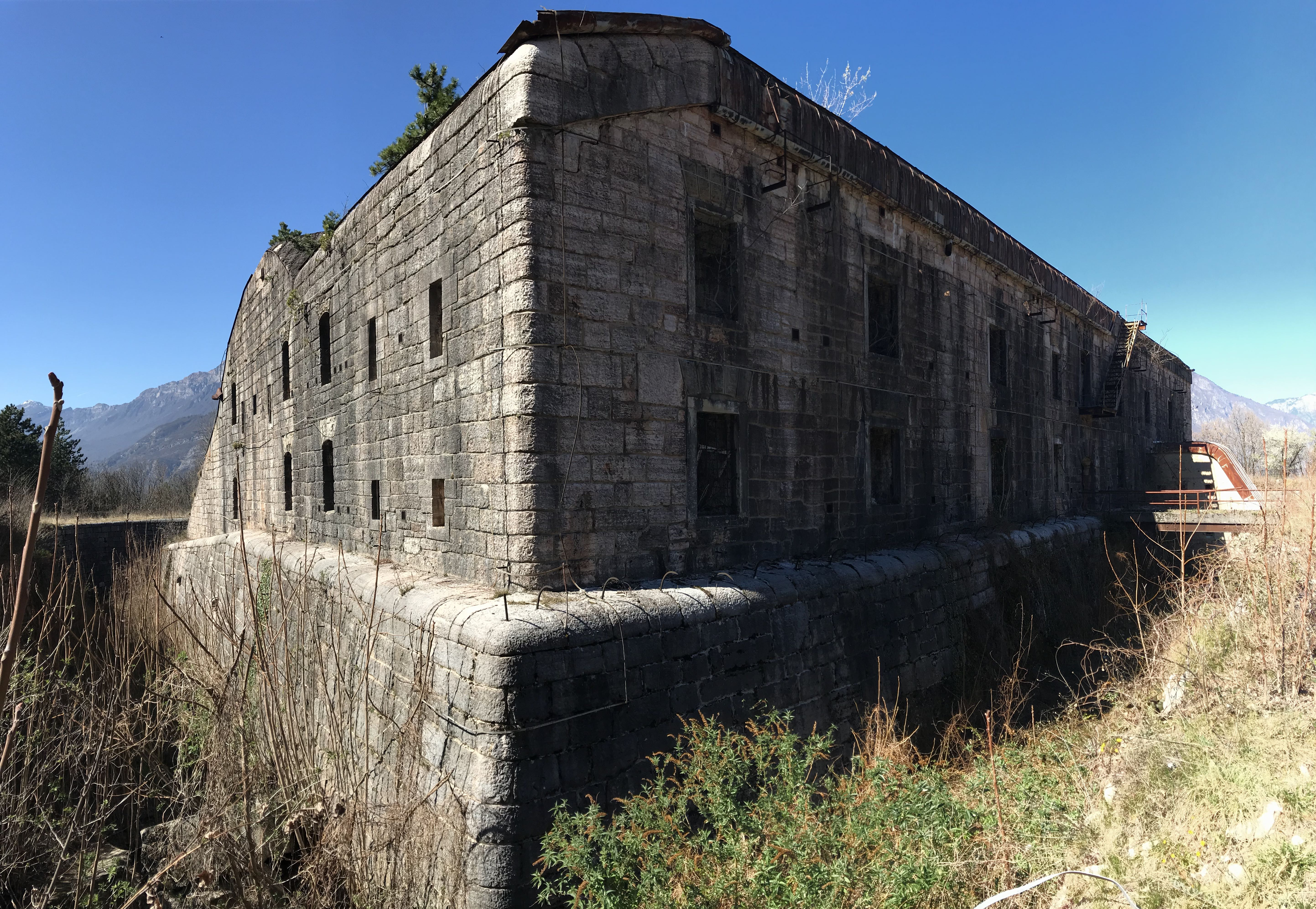
The corner of the Zampetta battery, off to the right is the entrance to the fort.

The Mattarello Fortified Complex is part of the system of forts built to protect the city of Trento. The fort was built from 1877-80 on the slopes of the mountain Vigolana. The complex controls access to the city from the Adige Valley. The complex was built with 3 levels, the lowest level was built 188990 with four 9 cm M75 field cannons for close defense. The lower section had two levels—1 above ground, which was surrounded by a moat, and one below ground.

== Low battery ==
The low battery was built between 1877 and 1880 out of local stone. The battery's job was to block an enemy assault coming down the Lagarina Valley from Rovereto. The battery was armed with four 7 cm guns. At the beginning of World War I, the low battery was obsolete, so the guns were removed and it was used as a warehouse. After World War I, the low battery was used as a powder magazine. In 1928, an explosion ripped apart the lower battery killing one soldier. Today the remains of the battery are used to house horses.

== Middle battery ==
The middle battery was built between 1877 and 1880 out of local stone. The middle battery's role was that of the low battery, controlling the route from Rovereto. Fort Romagnano had the same role, but the battery could fire more shells than Romagnano. The middle battery’s armament was five 12 cm howitzers in armored domes, five 8 cm quick-firing guns, and numerous rifle slits covering the approaches. When the Italians declared war in May 1915, the battery was considered vulnerable because it could be seen from a distance and was constructed out of weak materials. In 1915, the guns were removed and placed at the Zampetta battery. Concrete domes were placed where the guns had been to deceive the Italians as to their location. The fort is still owned by the Italian military and is in poor condition.

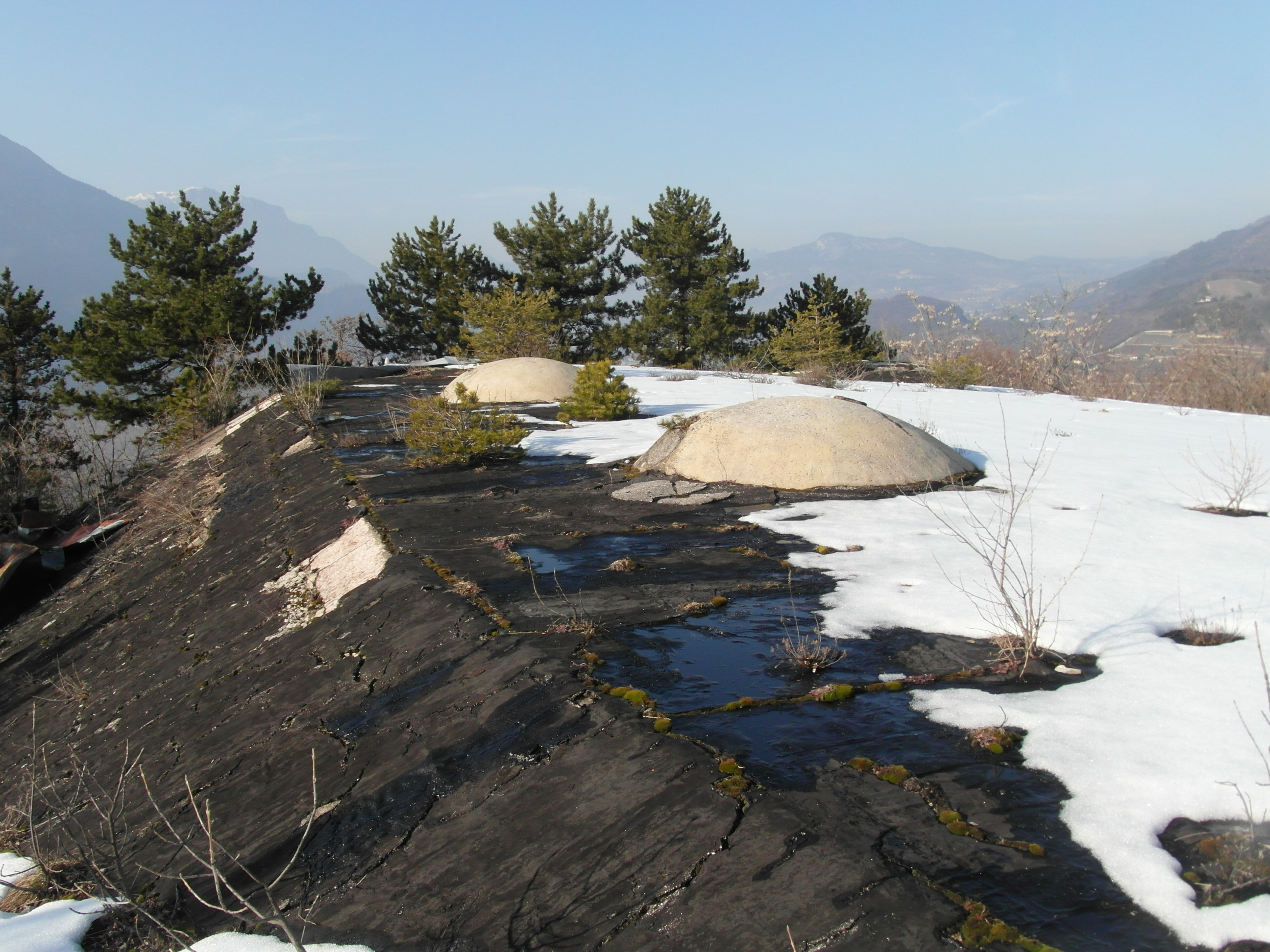
The concrete domes emplaced to deceive the Italians

== High or Zampetta battery ==
The high or Zampetta battery was built between 1898 and 1900. The fort was located 400 metres away from the highest level of the Mattarello works; this is where the armored domes from the Mattarello works were moved to. Unlike the lower parts of the complex, Zampetta could control the Adige and Valsorda Valleys in addition to the Fricca Pass. Zampetta's armament was five 10 cm guns originally, and in the summer of 1915, four 12 cm and 8 cm guns were added from the other parts of Mattarello. Until the 1980s Zampetta was used as a powder magazine for the Italian army; this is why Zampetta is so well preserved.

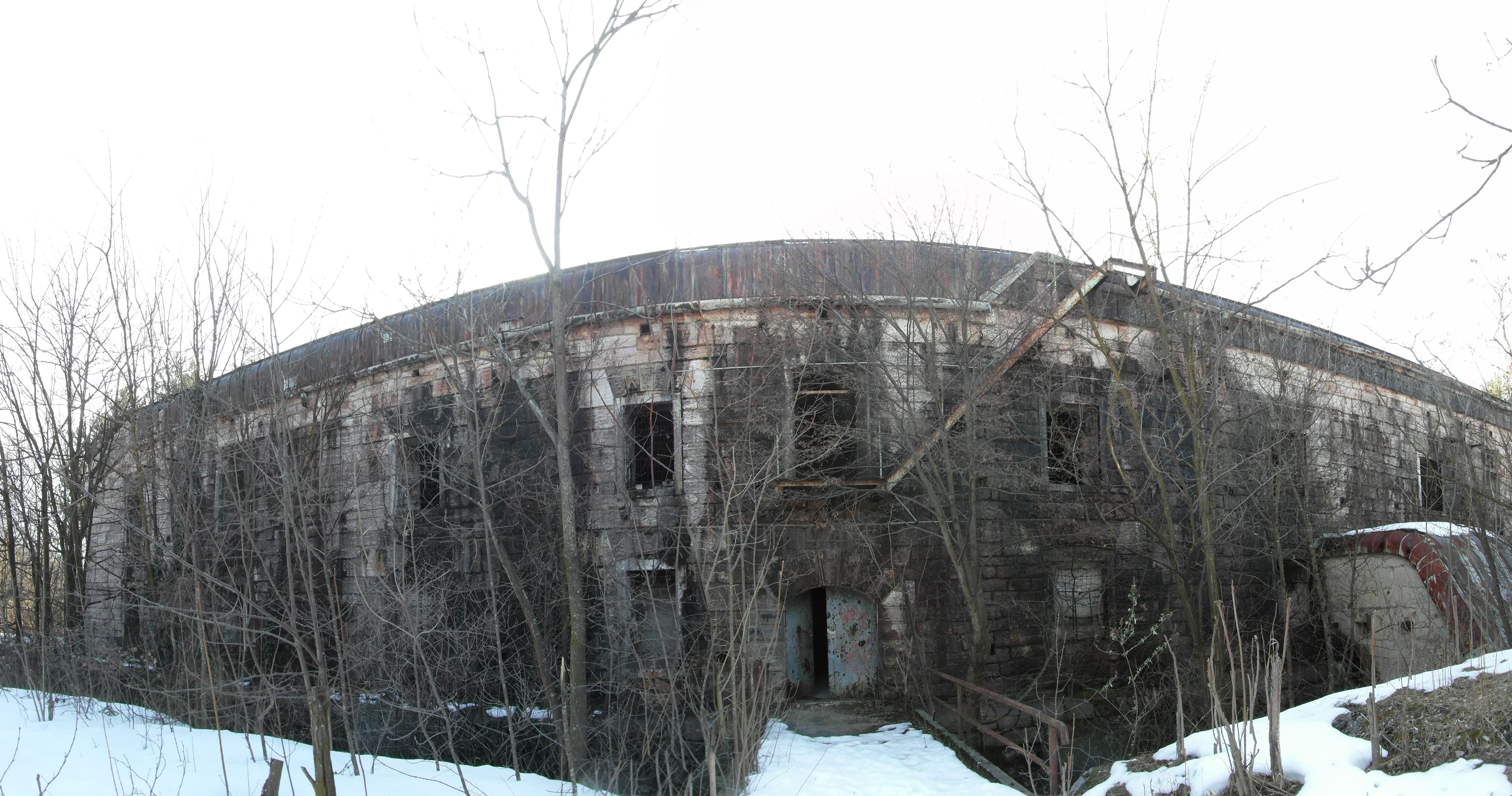
The entrance to Zampetta battey
