= Bosentino =

- Comune
- Comune di Bosentino
- Coat of arms

- Location within Italy Location within Trentino-Alto Adige/Südtirol
- Coordinates: 46°0′N 11°13′E
- Country: Italy
- Region: Trentino-Alto Adige/Südtirol
- Province: Trentino (TN)
- Frazioni: Migazzone

Area
  - Total: 4.7 km^{2} (1.8 sq mi)
- Elevation: 700 m (2,300 ft)

Population (Dec. 2004)
  - Total: 739
  - Density: 160/km^{2} (410/sq mi)
- Time zone: UTC+1 (CET)
  - Summer (DST): UTC+2 (CEST)
- Postal code: 38040
- Dialing code: 0461

Bosentino (Bosentin or Bosentim in local dialect) is a comune (municipality) in Trentino in the northern Italian region Trentino-Alto Adige/Südtirol, located about 11 kilometres (7 mi) southeast of Trento. As of 31 December 2004, it had a population of 739 and an area of 4.7 square kilometres (1.8 mi^{2}).

The municipality of Bosentino contains the frazione (subdivision) Migazzone.

Bosentino borders the following municipalities: Pergine Valsugana, Vigolo Vattaro, Caldonazzo, Calceranica al Lago, Vattaro, and Besenello.

== Demographic evolution ==
Historical population

Year	Pop.	±%
1861	?	—
1871	?	—
1881	?	—
1901	?	—
1911	?	—

Year	Pop.	±%
1921	814	—
1931	710	−12.8%
1936	620	−12.7%
1951	615	−0.8%
1961	564	−8.3%

Year	Pop.	±%
1971	577	+2.3%
1981	577	+0.0%
1991	597	+3.5%
2001	694	+16.2%

Source: Data from ISTAT
