= Centa San Nicolò =

- Comune
- Comune di Centa San Nicolò
- Coat of arms

- Location within Italy Location within Trentino-Alto Adige/Südtirol
- Coordinates: 45°58′N 11°14′E
- Country: Italy
- Region: Trentino-Alto Adige/Südtirol
- Province: Trentino (TN)

Area
  - Total: 11.3 km^{2} (4.4 sq mi)

Population (Dec. 2004)
  - Total: 596
  - Density: 52.7/km^{2} (137/sq mi)
- Time zone: UTC+1 (CET)
  - Summer (DST): UTC+2 (CEST)
- Postal code: 38040
- Dialing code: 0461

Centa San Nicolò (Trentino: Zénta) is a comune (municipality) in Trentino in the northern Italian region Trentino-Alto Adige/Südtirol, located about 14 kilometres (9 mi) southeast of Trento. As of 31 December 2004, it had a population of 596 and an area of 11.3 square kilometres (4.4 mi^{2}).

Centa San Nicolò borders the following municipalities: Caldonazzo, Calceranica al Lago, Vattaro, Besenello, and Folgaria.

== Demographic evolution ==
Historical population

Year	Pop.	±%
1861	?	—
1871	?	—
1881	?	—
1901	?	—
1911	?	—

Year	Pop.	±%
1921	1,057	—
1931	933	−11.7%
1936	815	−12.6%
1951	836	+2.6%
1961	712	−14.8%

Year	Pop.	±%
1971	586	−17.7%
1981	488	−16.7%
1991	464	−4.9%
2001	565	+21.8%

Source: Data from ISTAT
