= Besenello =

- Comune
- Comune di Besenello
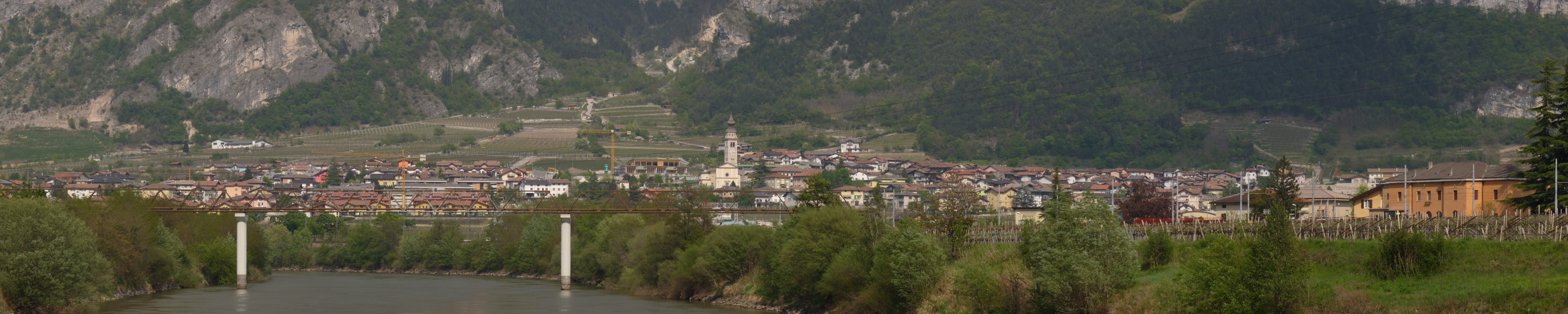

- Coat of arms

- Location within Italy Location within Trentino-Alto Adige/Südtirol
- Coordinates: 45°56′N 11°7′E
- Country: Italy
- Region: Trentino-Alto Adige/Südtirol
- Province: Trentino (TN)
- Frazioni: Acquaviva, Compet, Dietrobeseno, Golla, Màsera, Ondertòl, Posta Veccia, Sottocastello

Government
  - Mayor: Walter Battisti

Area
  - Total: 26.0 km^{2} (10.0 sq mi)
- Elevation: 218 m (715 ft)

Population (2026)
  - Total: 2,834
  - Density: 109/km^{2} (282/sq mi)
- Demonym: Beseneloti
- Time zone: UTC+1 (CET)
  - Summer (DST): UTC+2 (CEST)
- Postal code: 38060
- Dialing code: 0464
- Patron saint: St. Agatha
- Saint day: 5 February
- Website: Official website

Besenello (Besenèl in local dialect) is a comune (municipality) in Trentino in the northern Italian region Trentino-Alto Adige/Südtirol, located about 15 kilometres (9 mi) south of Trento. It is located at the entrance of the Vallagarina. The main attraction is the Castel Beseno, the largest fortified structure in Trentino and the Romanesque church of Sant'Agata.

Besenello borders the following municipalities: Trento, Vigolo Vattaro, Bosentino, Vattaro, Aldeno, Centa San Nicolò, Calliano, Nomi, and Folgaria.
