= Dolcè =

- Comune
- Comune di Dolcè
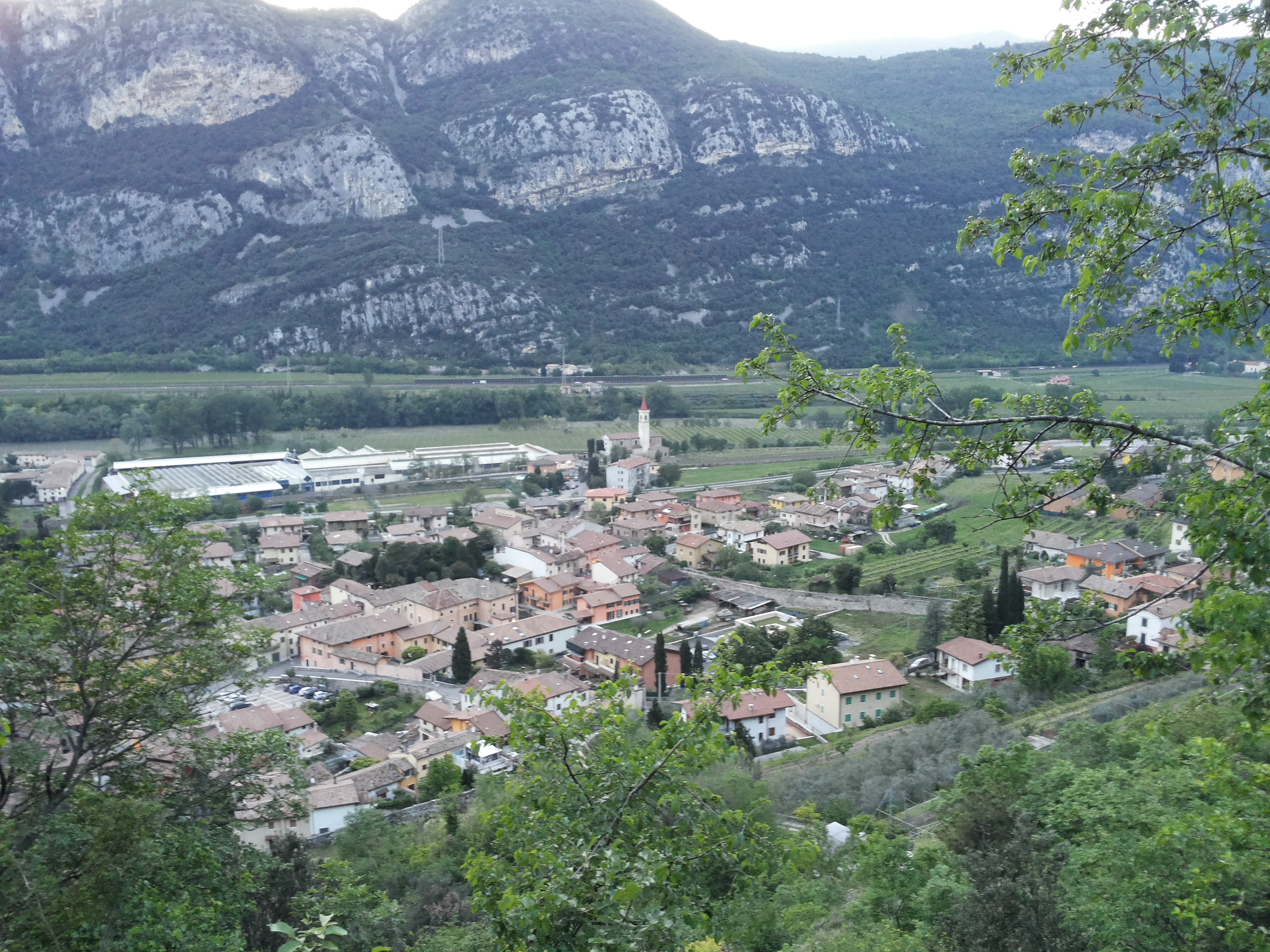

- Coat of arms

- Location within Italy Location within Veneto
- Coordinates: 45°36′N 10°51′E
- Country: Italy
- Region: Veneto
- Province: Verona (VR)
- Frazioni: Ceraino, Ossenigo, Peri, Volargne

Government
  - Mayor: Luca Manzelli

Area
  - Total: 39.4 km^{2} (15.2 sq mi)
- Elevation: 115 m (377 ft)

Population (1 June 2006)
  - Total: 2,444
  - Density: 62.0/km^{2} (161/sq mi)
- Demonym: Dolceati
- Time zone: UTC+1 (CET)
  - Summer (DST): UTC+2 (CEST)
- Postal code: 37020
- Dialing code: 045
- Website: Official website

Dolcè is a comune (municipality) in the Province of Verona in the Italian region Veneto, located about 120 kilometres (75 mi) west of Venice and about 20 kilometres (12 mi) northwest of Verona, in the Adige Valley.

== Main sights ==
- Parish church of Volargne (13th century), with frescoes
- Palazzo Guerrieri-Rizzardi (14th century)
- Villa Del Bene (16th century)
- Castelleto (13th century), a fortification at 400 m of altitude

== Twin towns ==
- Undenheim, Germany, since 1996
