= Vallarsa =

- Comune
- Comune di Vallarsa
- Flag

- Location within Italy Location within Trentino-Alto Adige/Südtirol
- Coordinates: 45°47′N 11°7′E
- Country: Italy
- Region: Trentino-Alto Adige/Südtirol
- Province: Trentino (TN)

Government
  - Mayor: Geremia Gios

Area
  - Total: 78.3 km^{2} (30.2 sq mi)

Population (Dec. 2004)
  - Total: 1,409
  - Density: 18.0/km^{2} (46.6/sq mi)
- Time zone: UTC+1 (CET)
  - Summer (DST): UTC+2 (CEST)
- Postal code: 38060
- Dialing code: 0464
- Website: Official website

Vallarsa (Cimbrian: Brandtal) is a comune (municipality) in Trentino in the northern Italian region Trentino-Alto Adige/Südtirol, located about 30 kilometres (19 mi) south of Trento. As of 31 December 2004, it had a population of 1,409 and an area of 78.3 square kilometres (30.2 mi^{2}).

The municipality of Vallarsa contains many frazioni (subdivision), the townhall is the frazione of Raossi.

Vallarsa borders the following municipalities: Rovereto, Trambileno, Ala, Valli del Pasubio and Recoaro Terme.

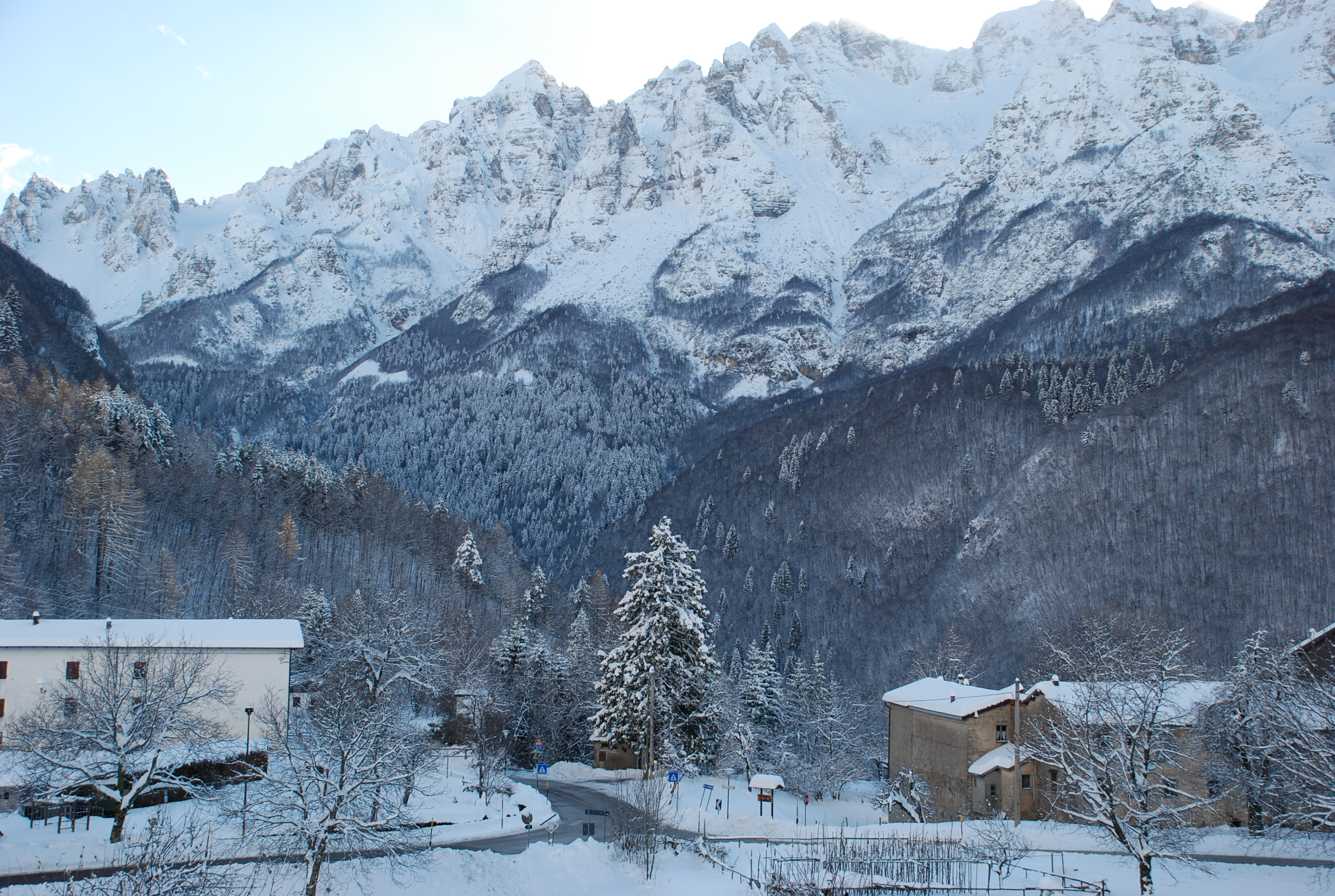
Winter view of Valarsa

== Demographic evolution ==
Historical population

Year	Pop.	±%
1861	?	—
1871	?	—
1881	?	—
1901	?	—
1911	?	—

Year	Pop.	±%
1921	3,463	—
1931	2,908	−16.0%
1936	2,808	−3.4%
1951	2,622	−6.6%
1961	2,258	−13.9%

Year	Pop.	±%
1971	1,674	−25.9%
1981	1,492	−10.9%
1991	1,431	−4.1%
2001	1,393	−2.7%

Source: Data from ISTAT
