= Vigolo Vattaro =

- Comune
- Comune di Vigolo Vattaro
- Coat of arms

- Location within Italy Location within Trentino-Alto Adige/Südtirol
- Coordinates: 46°0′N 11°12′E
- Country: Italy
- Region: Trentino-Alto Adige/Südtirol
- Province: Trentino (TN)

Area
  - Total: 20.7 km^{2} (8.0 sq mi)

Population (Dec. 2004)
  - Total: 1,985
  - Density: 95.9/km^{2} (248/sq mi)
- Time zone: UTC+1 (CET)
  - Summer (DST): UTC+2 (CEST)
- Postal code: 38049
- Dialing code: 0461
- Patron saint: Saint George

Vigolo Vattaro (Vìgol in local dialect) is a comune (municipality) in Trentino in the northern Italian region Trentino-Alto Adige/Südtirol, located about 10 kilometres (6 mi) southeast of Trento. As of 31 December 2004, it had a population of 1,985 and an area of 20.7 square kilometres (8.0 mi^{2}).

Vigolo Vattaro borders the following municipalities: Trento, Pergine Valsugana, Bosentino and Besenello.

== Demographic evolution ==
Historical population

Year	Pop.	±%
1861	?	—
1871	?	—
1881	?	—
1901	?	—
1911	?	—

Year	Pop.	±%
1921	1,590	—
1931	1,453	−8.6%
1936	1,362	−6.3%
1951	1,325	−2.7%
1961	1,353	+2.1%

Year	Pop.	±%
1971	1,306	−3.5%
1981	1,407	+7.7%
1991	1,572	+11.7%
2001	1,891	+20.3%

Source: Data from ISTAT
