= Tenna works =

Austro-Hungarian fortification in the Trentino

Coordinates: 46.009°N 11.2701°E

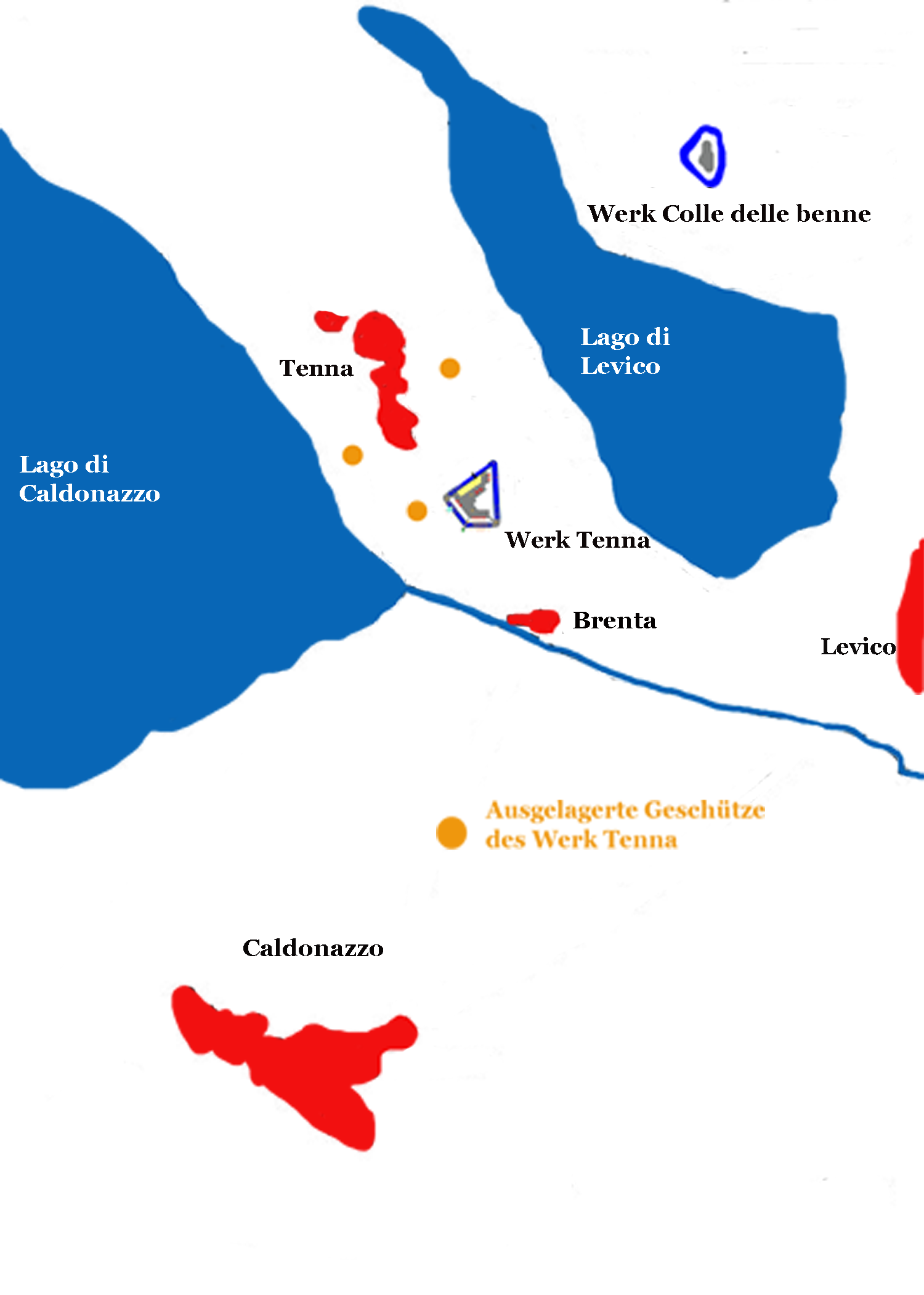
A small map details the position of Tenna in relation to the nearby locations.

Fort Tenna is an Austro-Hungarian fort built to guard the city of Trento. It is located on the hill that separates the lakes of Caldonazzo and Levico southeast of Trento. The fort was built between 1880-82, under the supervision of Julius Vogl. The building of Fort Tenna was part of a new strategy of building fortifications to reduce the amount of land sacrifice in case of invasion. The fort was supplied by a cable-car coming from the western shore of Lake Levico. Fort Tenna also controlled the access road lead towards Monterovere, which along the same road were the arguably the newest and best fortifications in the empire.

The fort has 4 levels, (1 of which is underground); on the ground floor there are service stations, while on the upper floor houses dormitories and gun ports. In particular, 4 gun ports towards Valsugana, 2 towards Caldonazzo, and 2 towards Fort Col De Le Bene. The fort was of the uncovered type, meaning it didn't have any camouflage or dirt covering the fort. At first the fort was built of masonry, this was later added to by adding a layer of concrete to the exterior. The fort was surrounded by a moat 6m wide and 4m deep, with a total length of 280m.

Since the fort had a moat, it could only be accessed by a bridge. The fort had telephone lines connecting to Trento, Fort Col De Le Bene, Monterovere, and the barracks of Levico. For emergencies the fort would communicate via optical signals with Fort Col De Le Bene and the works at Monte Celva. Like most forts constructed in the area, the fort was made to withstand a 1 month siege. It was equipped to do this with extra food storage chambers, and specific water tanks to collect rainwater.

The fort was supplied with power from a line coming from Pergine, supplying 5 kV. The expected garrison during peacetime was 6 officers and 197 non-commissioned men. However, in wartime the expected garrison was 7 officers and 233 non-commissioned men. The armament of the fort consisted of 2 15cm armored mortars, 8 12cm M80 fortress guns, 2 10cm howitzers, and 4 11mm machine guns for the defense of the surrounding moat. Later the 2 mortars were replaced by 2 10cm M5 cannons placed in rotating turrets with a 360 degree radius. The 8 12cm guns were placed on the second level in 3 casemates, each with minimal openings, surrounded by granite, giving it a 30 degree firing incline. 2 guns were pointed east of Levico, 4 towards the road from Lavarone, and 2 pointed South-West towards Valsorda.

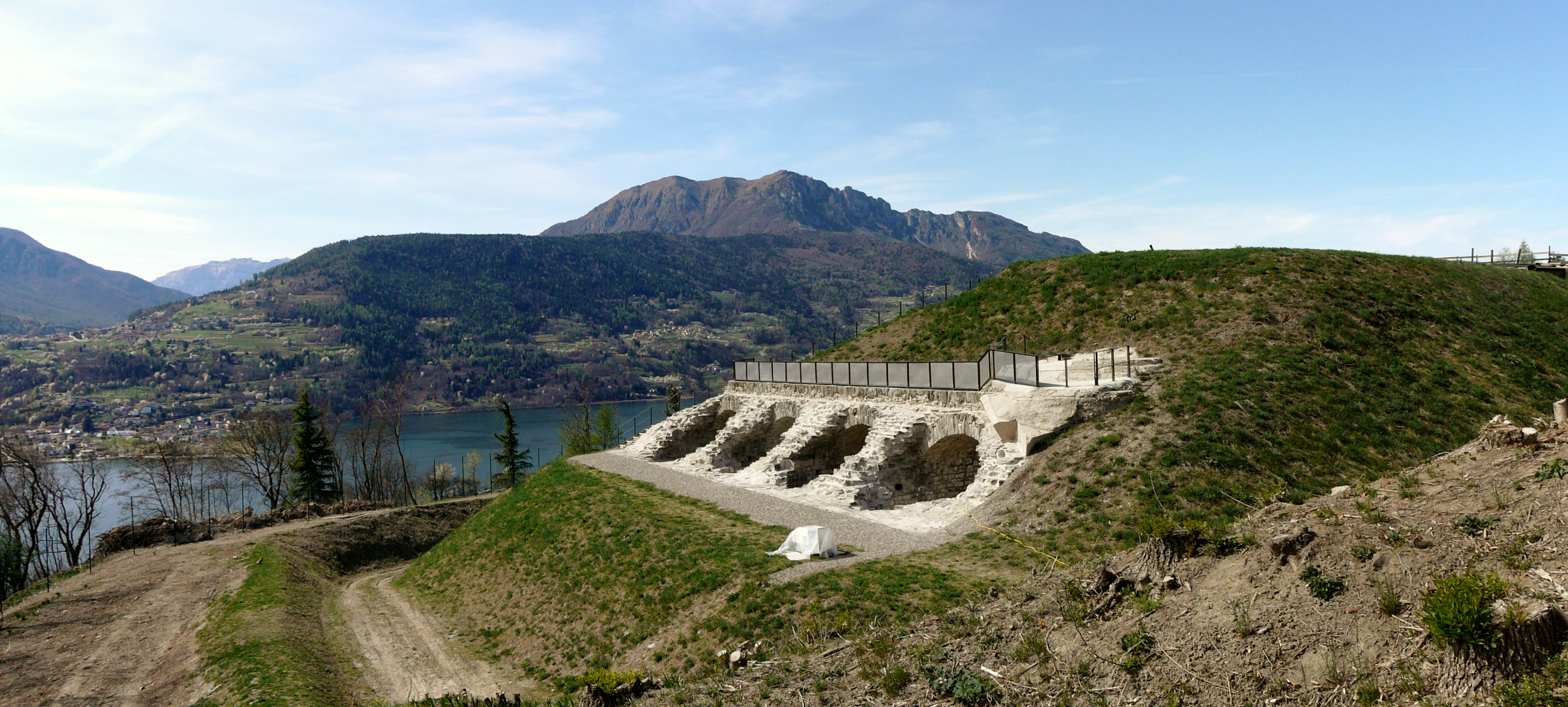
Where the guns pointing towards Lavarone were located.

== World War I ==
By the time the fort was finished, it was already inadequate. This is why when the war broke out, the decision was made to disarm the fort. The guns of the fort were removed and relocated to the nearby church of San Valentino. The guns were replaced by wooden dummy cannons in the fort; from this point on, the fort was only used as an observation post.

== Post-war ==
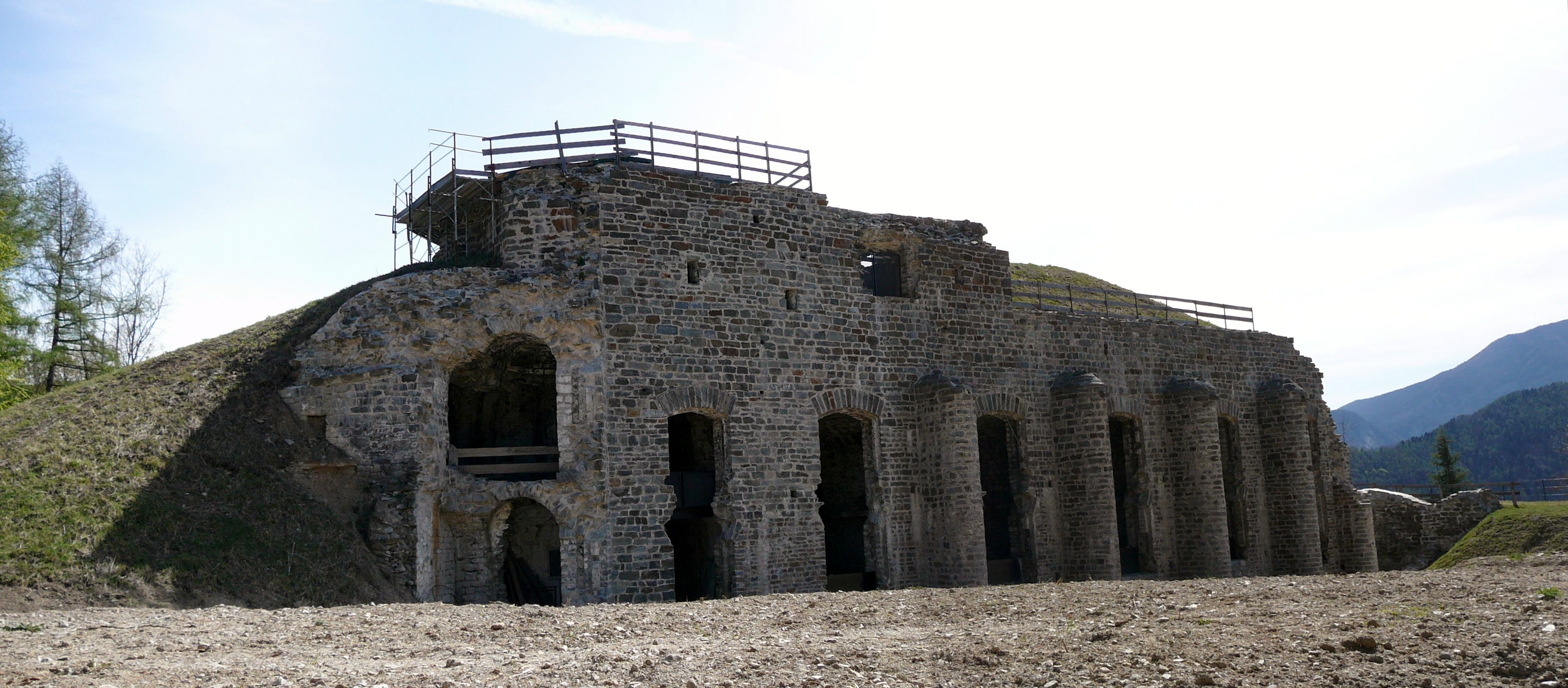
Where all the guns that weren't facing towards Lavarone were housed is now being renovated and being turned into a park.

The fort was sold in 1931 for 10,000 Lire, where it eventually made it into the hands of a local citizen who donated it to the local municipality of Tenna. Until recently the fort remained in a state of ruin. Since April 2009, renovations have been underway at the cost of 1,100,000 Euros. It opened to the public on August 18th, 2012. The floor was reconstructed with concrete, metal, and wood, in addition to a drainage system to remove any excess moisture. An urban park is planned to further integrate the fort into the local municipality.
