= Novaledo =

- Comune
- Comune di Novaledo
- Location within Italy Location within Trentino-Alto Adige/Südtirol
- Coordinates: 46°1′N 11°22′E
- Country: Italy
- Region: Trentino-Alto Adige/Südtirol
- Province: Trentino (TN)

Government
  - Mayor: Diego Margon

Area
  - Total: 8.0 km^{2} (3.1 sq mi)

Population (2026)
  - Total: 1,151
  - Density: 140/km^{2} (370/sq mi)
- Demonym: Masaroi
- Time zone: UTC+1 (CET)
  - Summer (DST): UTC+2 (CEST)
- Postal code: 38050
- Dialing code: 0461
- Website: Official website

Novaledo is a comune (municipality) in Trentino in the northern Italian region Trentino-Alto Adige/Südtirol, located in the Bassa Valsugana valley (Lower part of the Valsugana valley) about 20 kilometres (12 mi) southeast of Trento. As of 31 December 2004, it had a population of 882 and an area of 8.0 square kilometres (3.1 mi^{2}).

Novaledo borders the following municipalities: Frassilongo, Roncegno, Borgo Valsugana, Pergine Valsugana and Levico Terme.

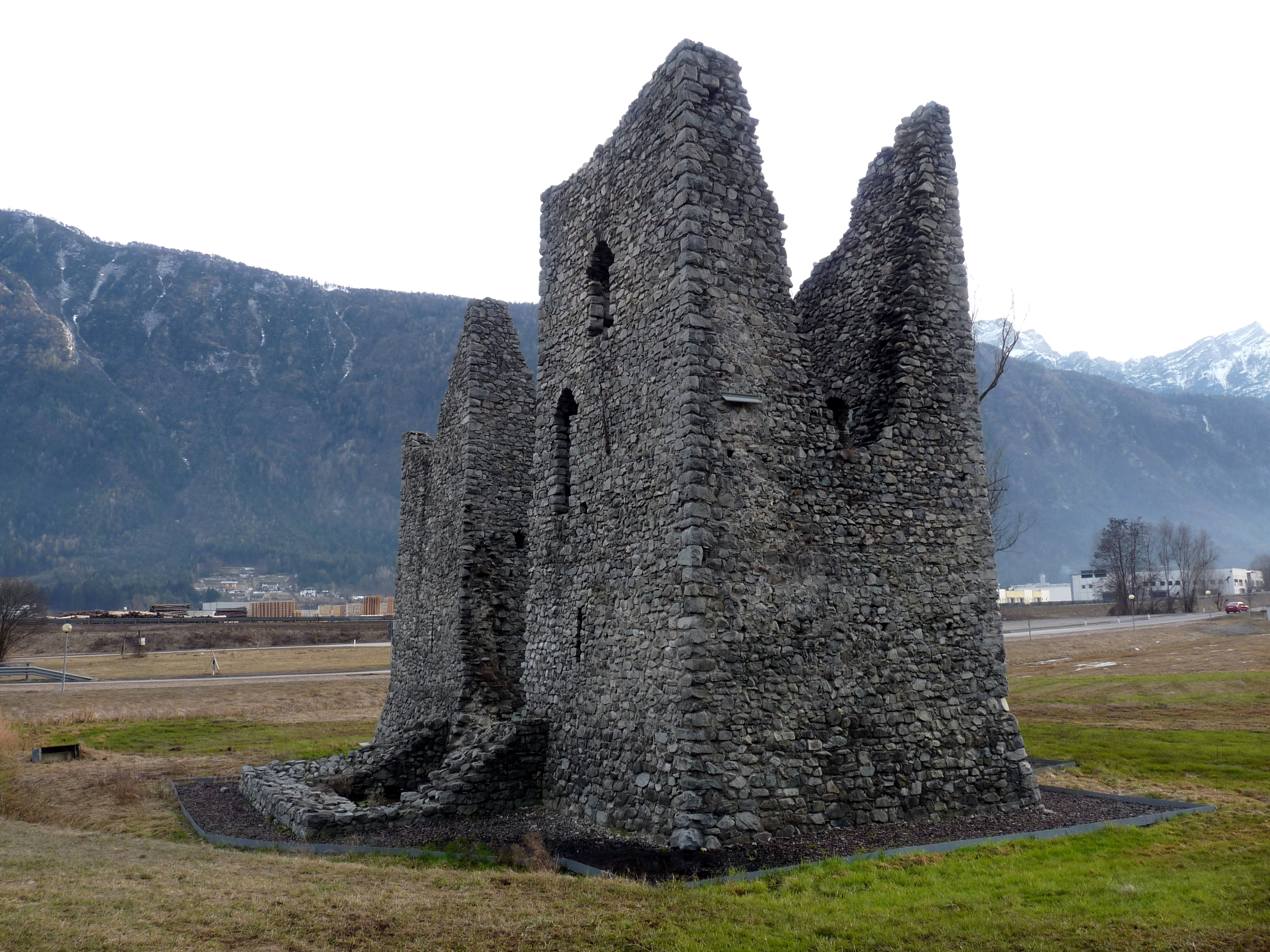
the Tor Quadra

== Demographic evolution ==
Historical population

Year	Pop.	±%
1861	?	—
1871	?	—
1881	?	—
1901	?	—
1911	?	—

Year	Pop.	±%
1921	940	—
1931	903	−3.9%
1936	905	+0.2%
1951	893	−1.3%
1961	794	−11.1%

Year	Pop.	±%
1971	702	−11.6%
1981	786	+12.0%
1991	795	+1.1%
2001	882	+10.9%

Source: Data from ISTAT
