= Frassilongo =

- Comune
- Comune di Frassilongo
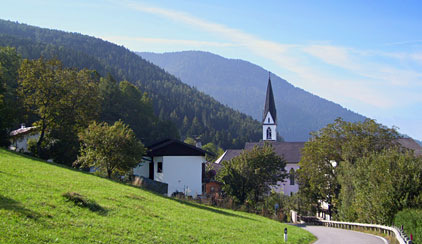
- The gothic church of Sant'Udalrico

- Coat of arms

- Location within Italy Location within Trentino-Alto Adige/Südtirol
- Coordinates: 46°5′N 11°18′E
- Country: Italy
- Region: Trentino-Alto Adige/Südtirol
- Province: Trentino (TN)
- Frazioni: Kamauz (Kamaovrunt), Roveda (Oachlait)

Government
  - Mayor: Luca Puecher

Area
  - Total: 16.7 km^{2} (6.4 sq mi)

Population (2026)
  - Total: 336
  - Density: 20.1/km^{2} (52.1/sq mi)
- Time zone: UTC+1 (CET)
  - Summer (DST): UTC+2 (CEST)
- Postal code: 38050
- Dialing code: 0461
- Website: Official website

Frassilongo (Mocheno: Garait) is a comune (municipality) in Trentino in the northern Italian region Trentino-Alto Adige/Südtirol, located about 14 kilometres (9 mi) east of Trento. As of 31 December 2004, it had a population of 354 and an area of 16.7 square kilometres (6.4 mi^{2}).

Frassilongo borders the following municipalities: Sant'Orsola Terme, Fierozzo, Roncegno, Vignola-Falesina, Pergine Valsugana, Novaledo and Levico Terme.

In the census of 2001, 340 inhabitants out of 357 (95.2%) declared themselves members of the Mócheno linguistic group.

== Demographic evolution ==
Historical population

Year	Pop.	±%
1861	?	—
1871	?	—
1881	?	—
1901	?	—
1911	?	—

Year	Pop.	±%
1921	698	—
1931	641	−8.2%
1936	638	−0.5%
1951	634	−0.6%
1961	623	−1.7%

Year	Pop.	±%
1971	472	−24.2%
1981	462	−2.1%
1991	380	−17.7%
2001	357	−6.1%

Source: Data from ISTAT
