= Tenna, Trentino =

Tenna
- Comune
- Comune di Tenna
- Coat of arms

- Location within Italy Location within Trentino-Alto Adige/Südtirol
- Coordinates: 46°1′N 11°16′E
- Country: Italy
- Region: Trentino-Alto Adige/Südtirol
- Province: Trentino (TN)

Government
  - Mayor: Valter Motter

Area
  - Total: 3.1 km^{2} (1.2 sq mi)

Population (Dec. 2004)
  - Total: 918
  - Density: 300/km^{2} (770/sq mi)
- Time zone: UTC+1 (CET)
  - Summer (DST): UTC+2 (CEST)
- Postal code: 38050
- Dialing code: 0461
- Website: Official website

Tenna (Téna in local dialect) is a comune (municipality) in Trentino in the northern Italian region Trentino-Alto Adige/Südtirol, located about 13 kilometres (8 mi) southeast of Trento. As of 31 December 2004, it had a population of 918 and an area of 3.1 square kilometres (1.2 mi^{2}).

Tenna borders the following municipalities: Pergine Valsugana, Levico Terme and Caldonazzo.

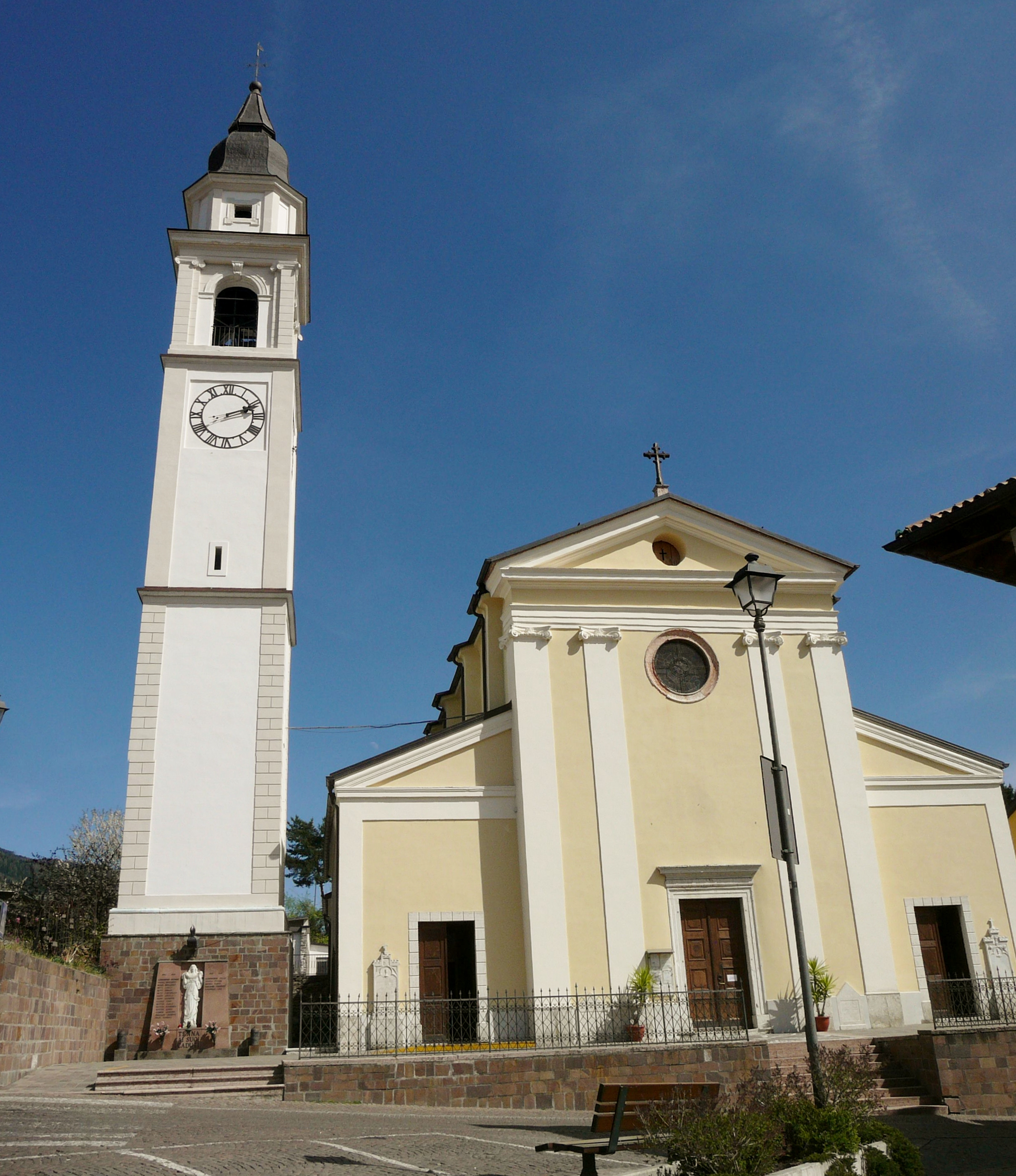
the Parish church

== Demographic evolution ==
Historical population

Year	Pop.	±%
1861	?	—
1871	?	—
1881	?	—
1901	?	—
1911	?	—

Year	Pop.	±%
1921	842	—
1931	741	−12.0%
1936	733	−1.1%
1951	677	−7.6%
1961	648	−4.3%

Year	Pop.	±%
1971	602	−7.1%
1981	653	+8.5%
1991	723	+10.7%
2001	850	+17.6%

Source: Data from ISTAT
