= Cimirlo Battery =

Fortification in Trento, Italy

The Cimirlo Battery was built between 1879-1882 to guard the Fersina Valley and thus access to Trento. The battery is situated just above the Roncogno battery on Monte Celva. Cimirlo was built out of stone that could be found locally, like most fortifications built around Trento at the time. Sources on the armament of the battery vary, though most sources agree that the fort mounted 3 15cm guns in casemates and 3 7cm guns mounted in barbettes exposed to the weather.

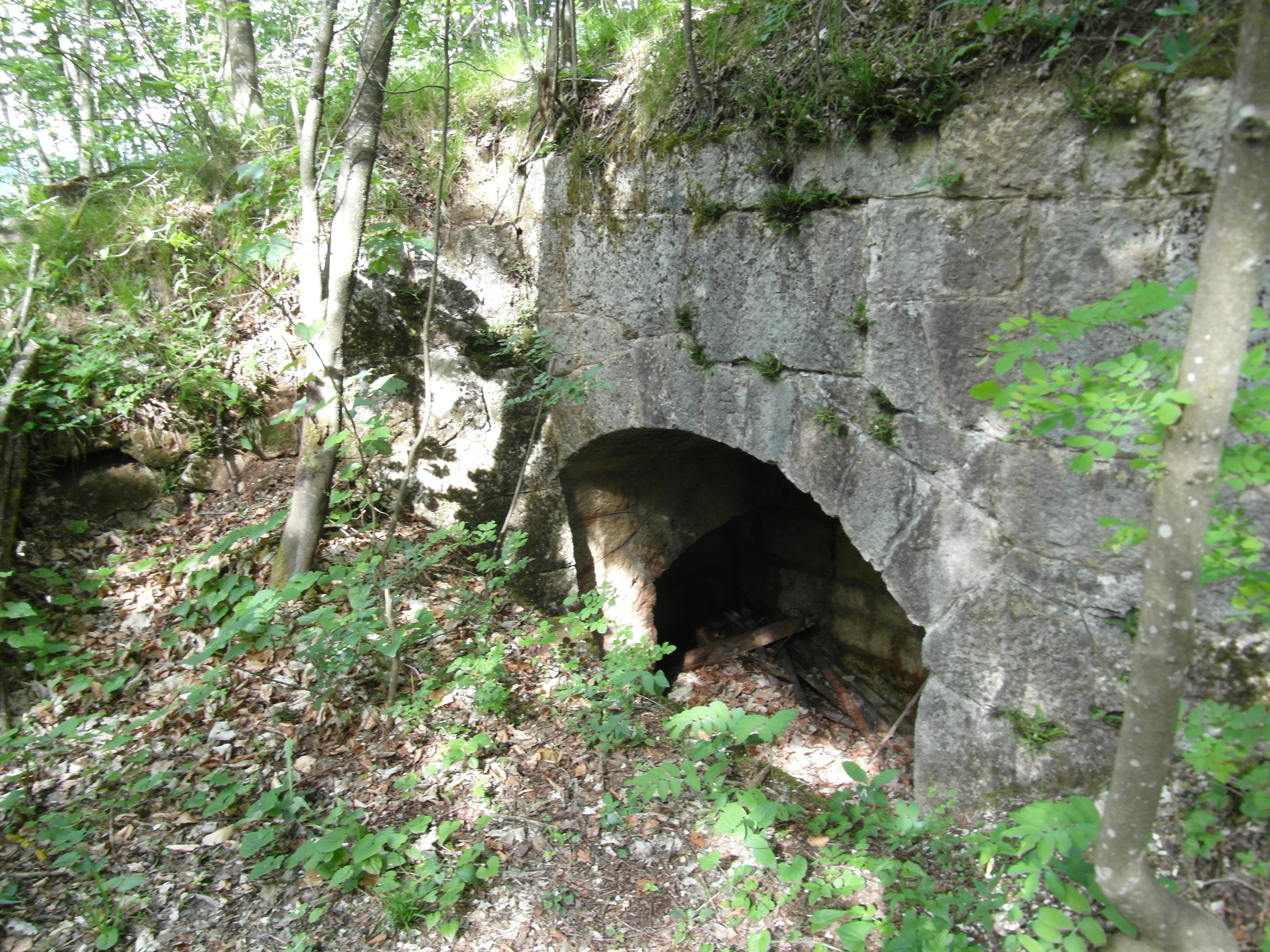
One of the 15cm guns was positioned here.

== World War I ==
By 1915 the fort was obsolete, it was dismantled and its guns moved to frontline sectors. Although the battery was dismantled and disarmed, a line of trenches was dug around it and led to the Roncogno battery.

== Post-war ==
After the war, the battery was sold into private hands. Recently, a house was built on top of the remains of the battery and it is not open to the public.

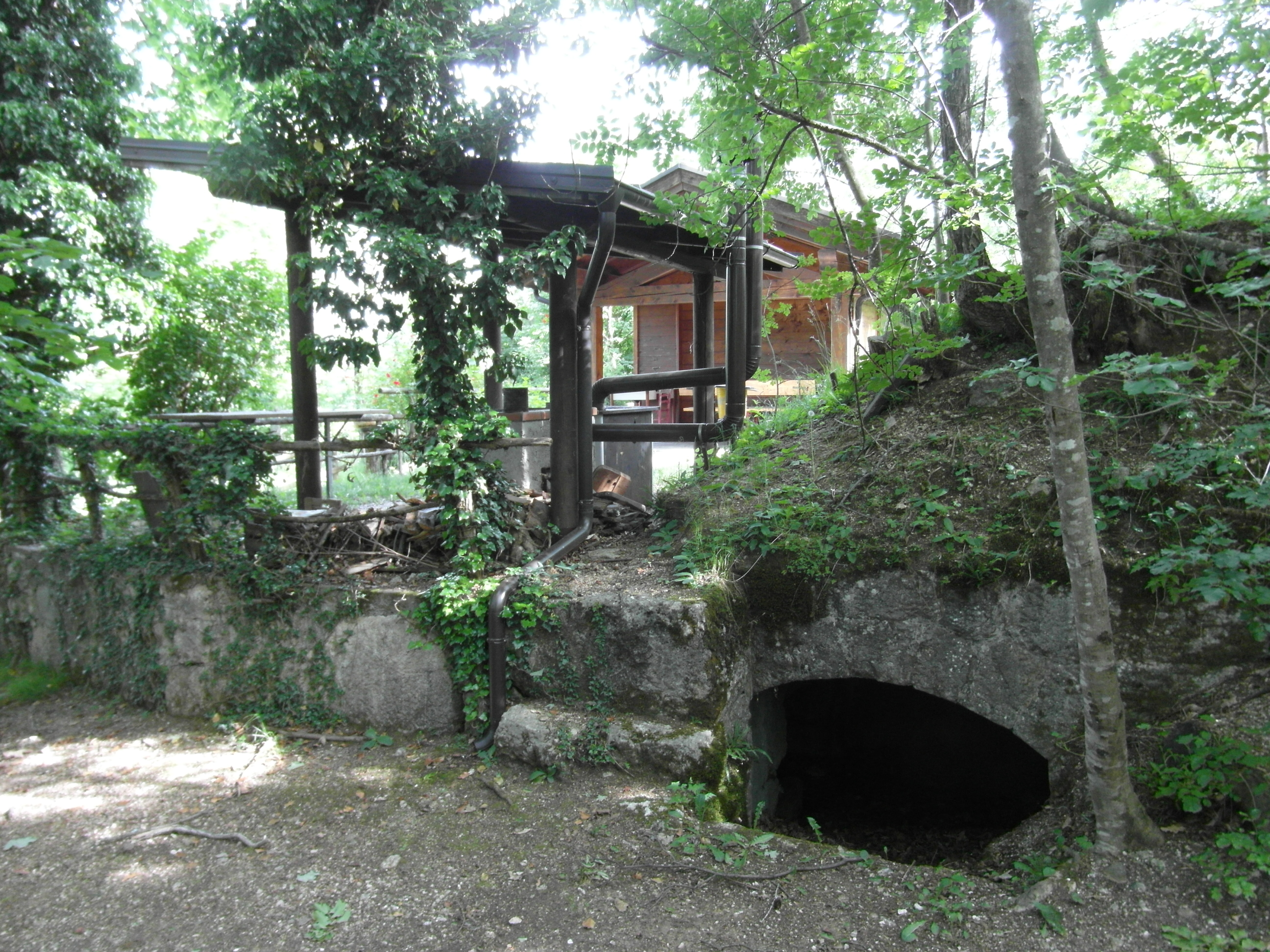
The part of the fort that the house was built on. Just to the right of the stairs is where a 15cm gun would be.
