= Vignola-Falesina =

- Comune
- Comune di Vignola-Falesina
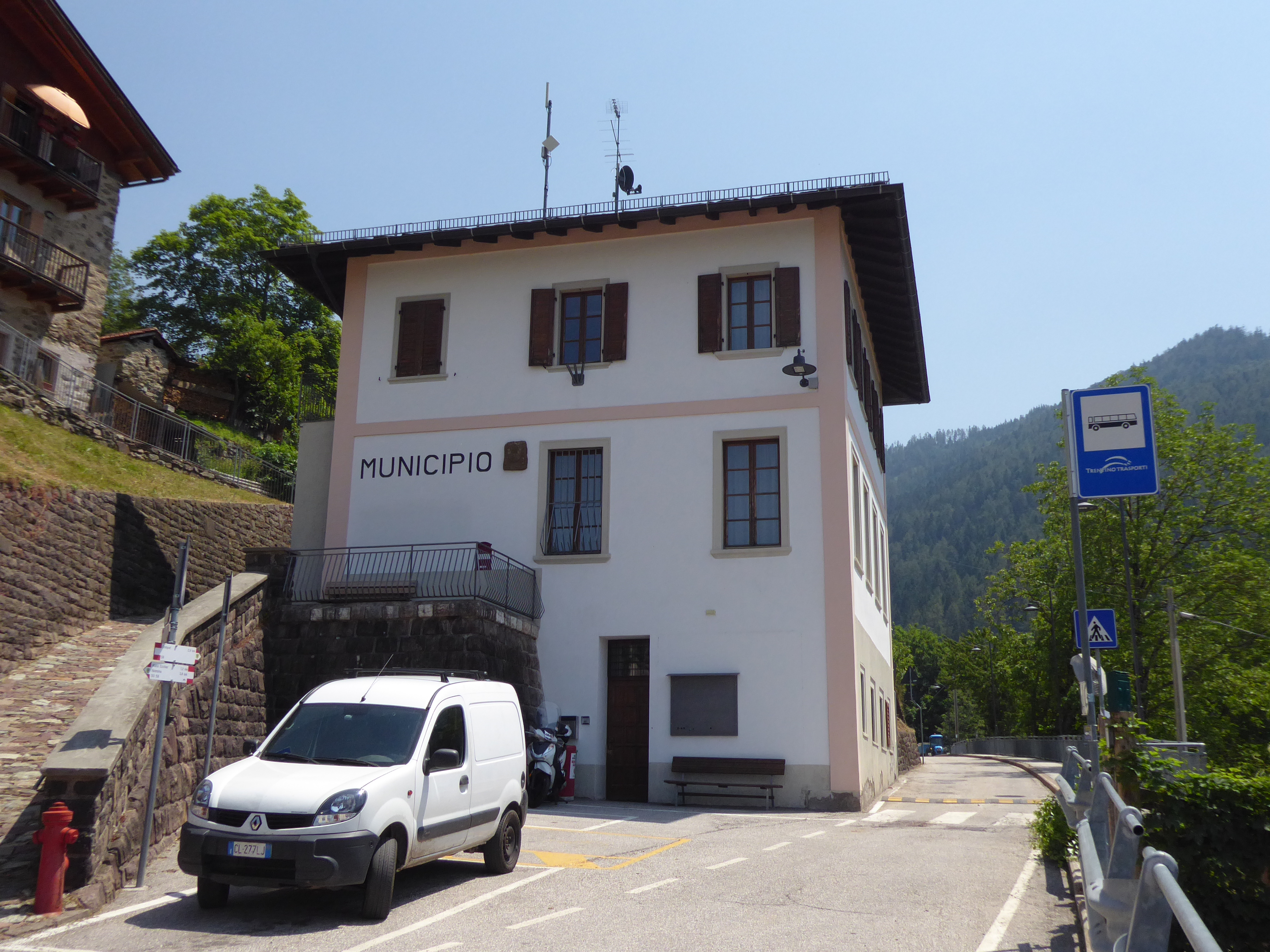
- Town hall

- Coat of arms

- Location within Italy Location within Trentino-Alto Adige/Südtirol
- Coordinates: 46°3′N 11°17′E
- Country: Italy
- Region: Trentino-Alto Adige/Südtirol
- Province: Trentino (TN)

Government
  - Mayor: Mirko Gadler

Area
  - Total: 12.0 km^{2} (4.6 sq mi)

Population (Dec. 2004)
  - Total: 128
  - Density: 10.7/km^{2} (27.6/sq mi)
- Time zone: UTC+1 (CET)
  - Summer (DST): UTC+2 (CEST)
- Postal code: 38050
- Dialing code: 0461
- Website: Official website

Vignola-Falesina is a comune (municipality) in Trentino in the northern Italian region Trentino-Alto Adige/Südtirol, located about 13 kilometres (8 mi) east of Trento. As of 31 December 2004, it had a population of 128 and an area of 12.0 square kilometres (4.6 mi^{2}).

Vignola-Falesina borders the following municipalities: Frassilongo, Pergine Valsugana and Levico Terme.

== Demographic evolution ==
Historical population

Year	Pop.	±%
1861	?	—
1871	?	—
1881	?	—
1901	?	—
1911	?	—

Year	Pop.	±%
1921	346	—
1931	253	−26.9%
1936	273	+7.9%
1951	213	−22.0%
1961	321	+50.7%

Year	Pop.	±%
1971	139	−56.7%
1981	170	+22.3%
1991	111	−34.7%
2001	109	−1.8%

Source: Data from ISTAT
