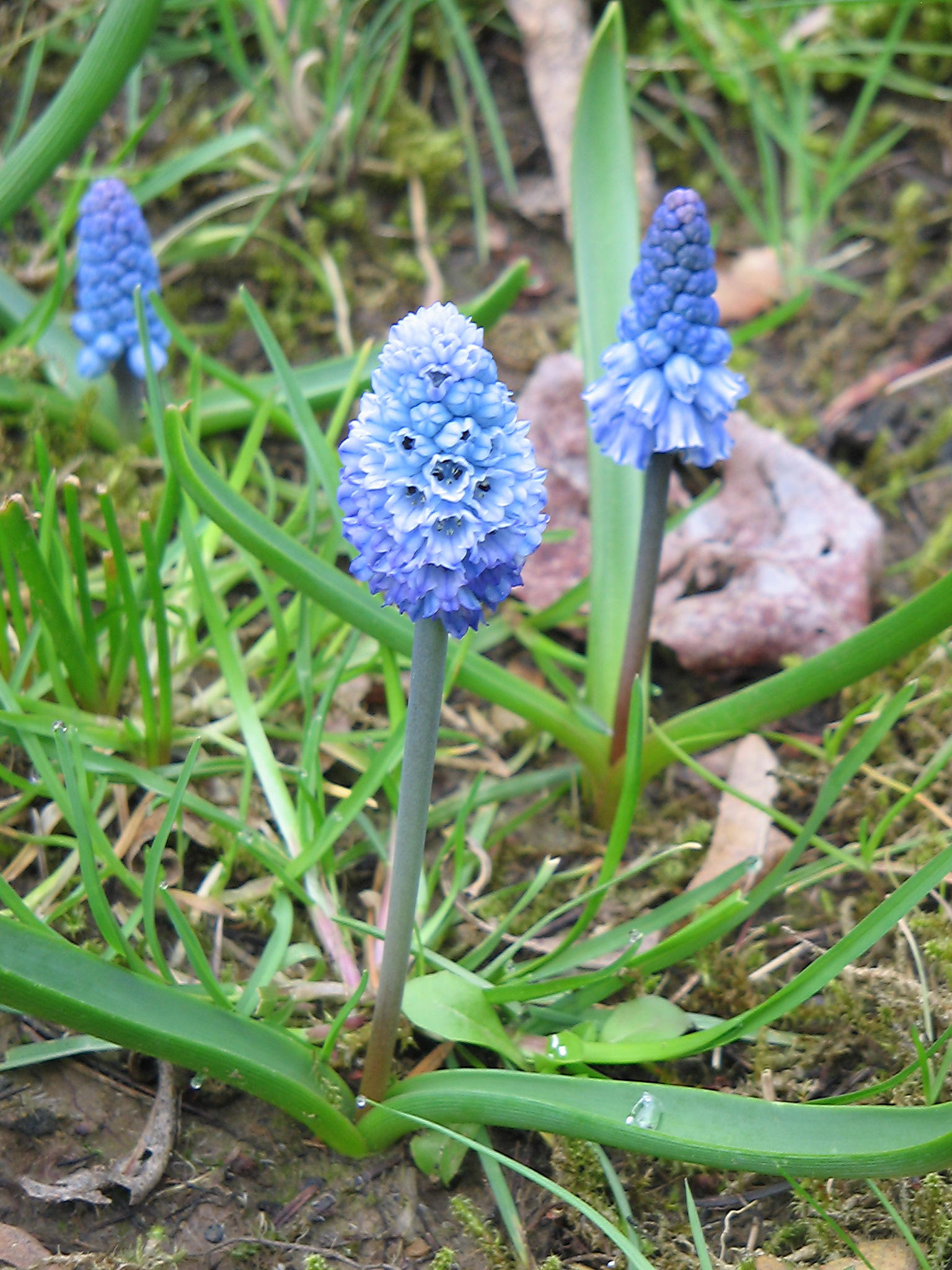
- M. azureum

Scientific classification
- Kingdom: Plantae
- Clade: Tracheophytes
- Clade: Angiosperms
- Clade: Monocots
- Order: Asparagales
- Family: Asparagaceae
- Subfamily: Scilloideae
- Genus: Muscari
- Subgenus: Muscari subg. Pseudomuscari (Losinsk.) D.C.Stuartr

Synonyms
- Pseudomuscari Garbari & Greuter

= Muscari subg. Pseudomuscari =

Genus of flowering plants

Muscari subg. Pseudomuscari is a subgenus of bulbous perennials in the family Asparagaceae subfamily Scilloideae that has been treated as the separate genus Pseudomuscari. Muscari species placed in the subfamily have flowers in shades of pale or bright blue, and are small plants with dense flower spikes or racemes. A feature which distinguishes them from other groups of Muscari is the bell-shaped flower which is not constricted at the mouth. One species, Muscari azureum (syn. Pseudomuscari azureum), is popularly grown in gardens as an ornamental Spring-flowering plant.

== Systematics ==
The group of species now placed in Muscari subg. Pseudomuscari was separated off as a section within Muscari by A.S. Losina-Losinskaja in a 1935 publication and as a subgenus by D.C. Stuart in 1965, but neither name was validly published. The group was first formally described as a genus by Fabio Garbari and Werner Greuter in 1970. A molecular phylogenetic study in 2023 concluded that Pseudomuscari was embedded in Muscari, and so reduced the genus again to a subgenus of Muscari, M. subg. Pseudomuscari. As of September 2025, Plants of the World Online treated Pseudomuscari as a synonym of Muscari.

=== Species ===
In 2023, Böhnert et al. placed eight species in M. subg. Pseudomuscari:

Image	Scientific name	Distribution
	Muscari azureum Fenzl	Turkey
	Muscari coeleste Fomin	E. Turkey
	Muscari forniculatum Fomin	NE. Turkey
	Muscari inconstrictum Rech.f.	E. Medit. to NW. Iran
	Muscari kurdicum Maroofi	
	Muscari parviflorum Desf.	
	Muscari pseudomuscari (Boiss. & Buhse) Wendelbo (syn. Muscari chalusicum D.C.Stuart)	N. Iran
	Muscari tavoricum Ravenna	
