= Pergine Valsugana =

- Comune
- Comune di Pergine Valsugana
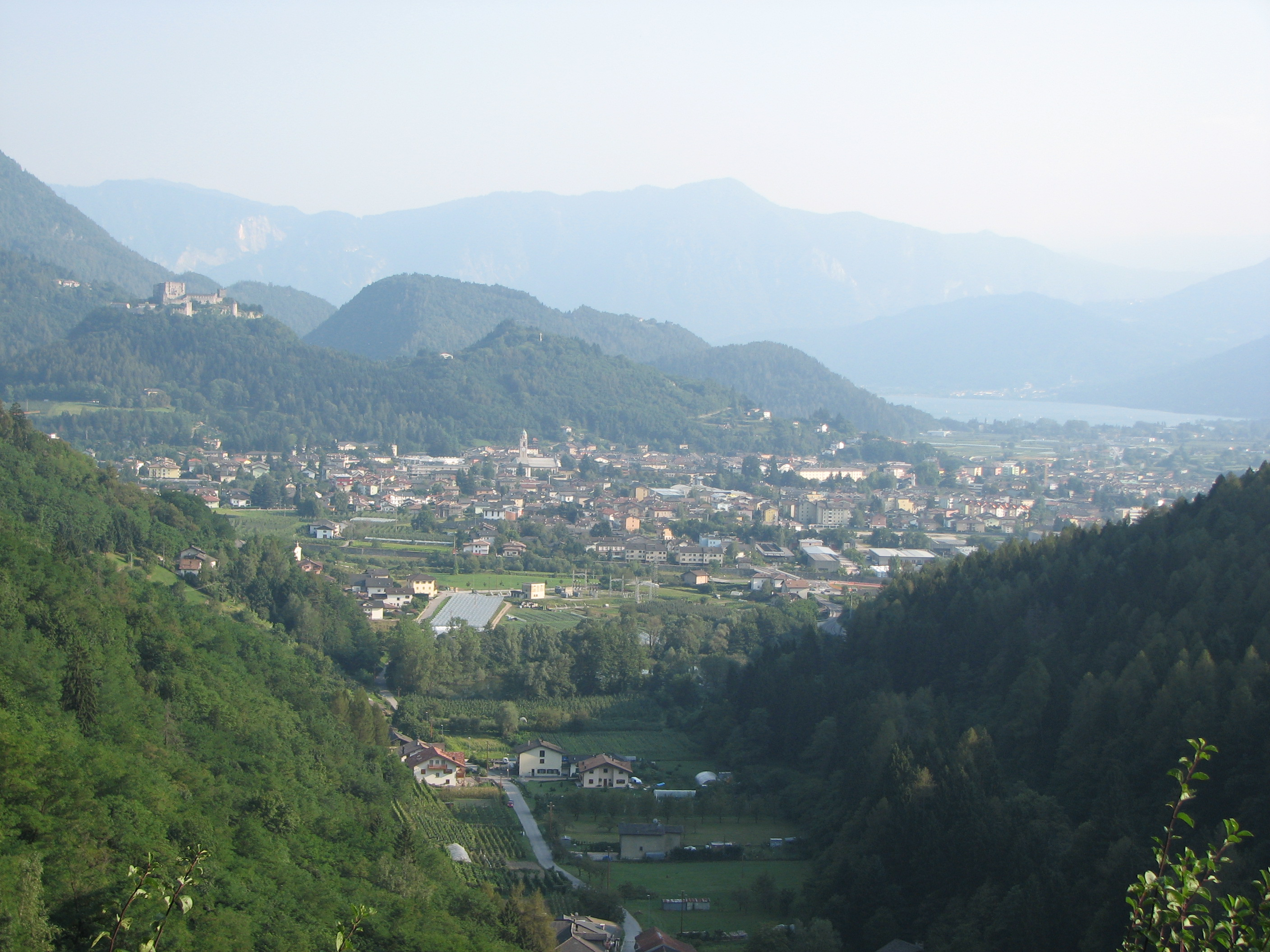

- Coat of arms

- Location within Italy Location within Trentino-Alto Adige/Südtirol
- Coordinates: 46°4′N 11°14′E
- Country: Italy
- Region: Trentino-Alto Adige/Südtirol
- Province: Trentino (TN)
- Frazioni: Brazzaniga, Buss, Canale, Canezza, Canzolino, Casalino, Costasavina, Ischia, Madrano, Masetti, Nogaré, Roncogno, San Cristoforo al Lago, Santa Caterina, San Vito, Serso, Susà, Valcanover, Viarago, Vigalzano, Zivignago

Government
  - Mayor: Marco Morelli

Area
  - Total: 54.4 km^{2} (21.0 sq mi)
- Elevation: 482 m (1,581 ft)

Population (28 February 2017)
  - Total: 21,433
  - Density: 394/km^{2} (1,020/sq mi)
- Demonym: Perginesi / Perzenaitri
- Time zone: UTC+1 (CET)
  - Summer (DST): UTC+2 (CEST)
- Postal code: 38057
- Dialing code: 0461
- Patron saint: Saint Mary
- Saint day: September 8
- Website: Official website

Pergine Valsugana (Pèrzen or Pèrzem in local dialect, German: Fersen im Suganertal) is a comune (municipality) in Trentino in the northern Italian region Trentino-Alto Adige/Südtirol, located about 9 kilometres (6 mi) east of Trento.

Pergine Valsugana borders the following municipalities: Baselga di Pinè, Trento, Fornace, Sant'Orsola Terme, Civezzano, Frassilongo, Vignola-Falesina, Novaledo, Levico Terme, Tenna, Vigolo Vattaro, Bosentino, Caldonazzo and Calceranica al Lago.

== Main sights ==
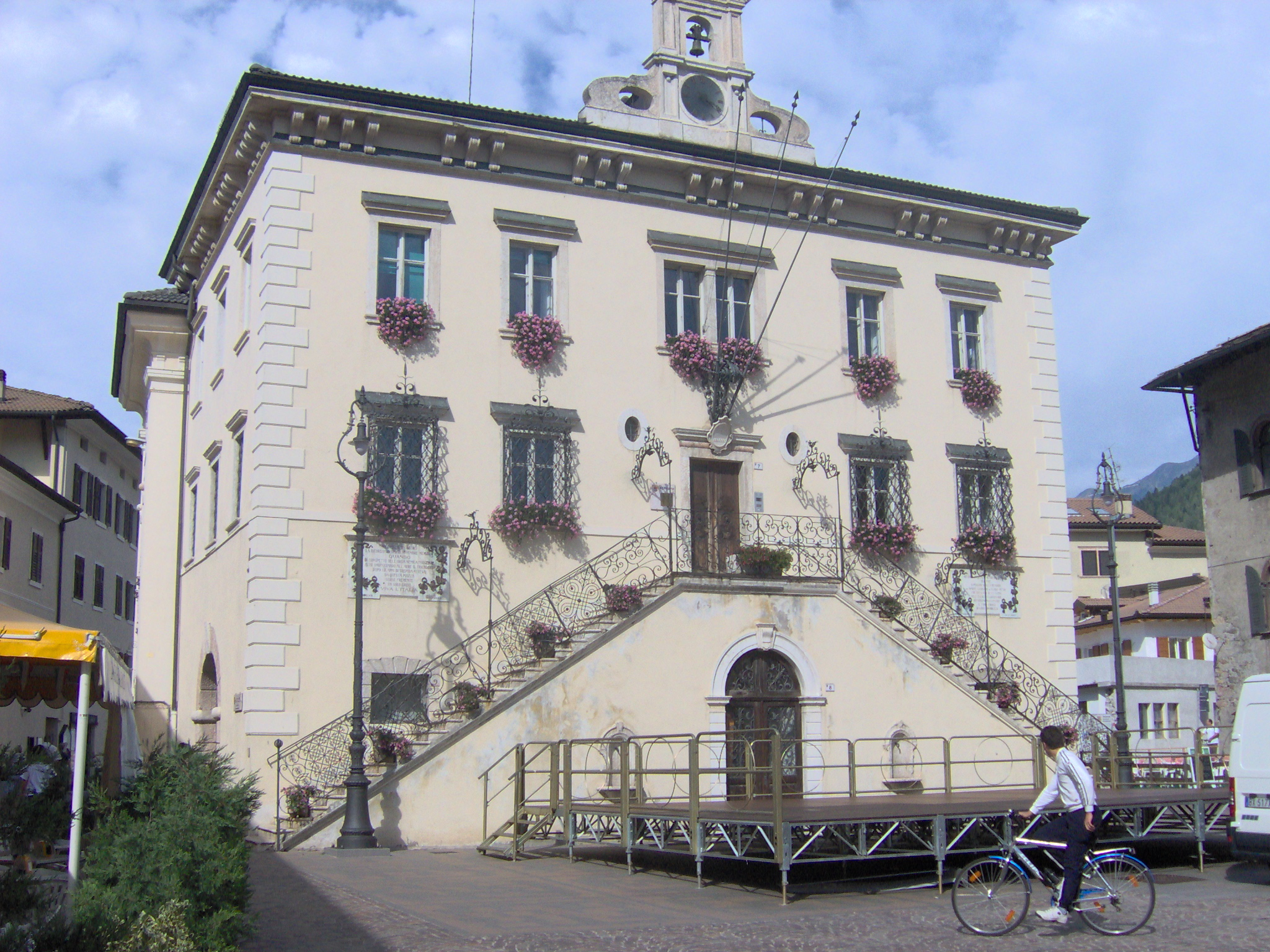
The Town Hall

- Castle, a medieval fortification on a hill at 657 m above the sea level. It is known from 845, although it could be of Lombard or even late-Roman origins.
- Late Gothic-style church of Santa Maria
- Church of San Carlo, rebuilt in 1619
- Palazzo Tomelin (17th century)
- Palazzo a Prato (16th century)
- Palazzo Gentili-Crivelli (16th century)
- Palazzo Hippoliti (late 15th century)

== Residents ==
- Fabio Garbari (born 1937), botanist and academic
