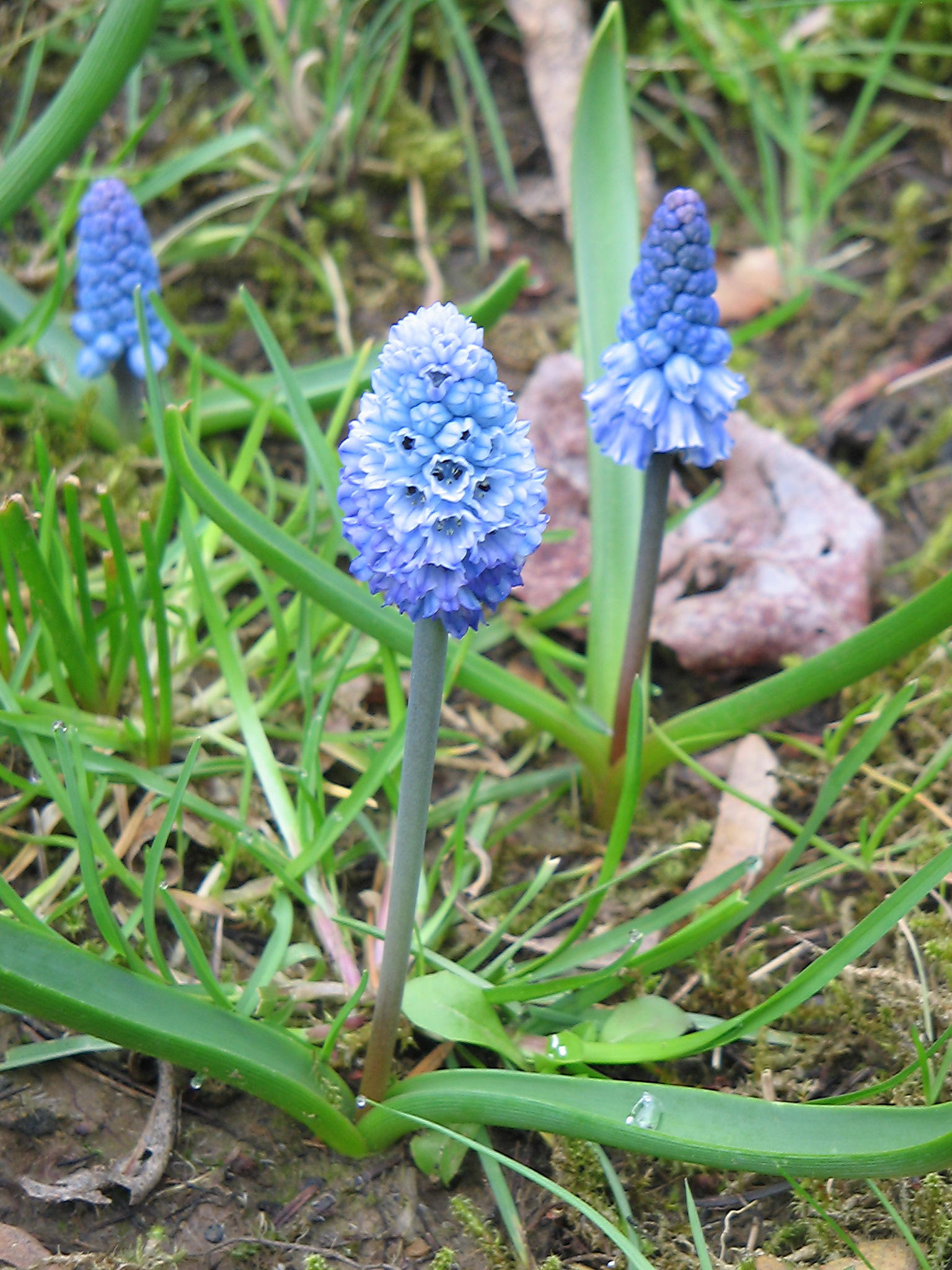

Scientific classification
- Kingdom: Plantae
- Clade: Tracheophytes
- Clade: Angiosperms
- Clade: Monocots
- Order: Asparagales
- Family: Asparagaceae
- Subfamily: Scilloideae
- Genus: Muscari
- Subgenus: Muscari subg. Pseudomuscari
- Species: M. azureum

Binomial name
- Muscari azureum Fenzl

Synonyms
- Bellevalia azurea (Fenzl) Boiss.; Hyacinthella azurea (Fenzl) Chouard; Muscari praecox Siehe; Pseudomuscari azureum (Fenzl) Garbari & Greuter

= Muscari azureum =

Species of flowering plant

Muscari azureum (syn. Pseudomuscari azureum), the azure grape hyacinth, is a species of flowering plant in the family Asparagaceae, native to Turkey. A bulbous perennial, it is grown in gardens for its spring flowers. The Latin specific epithet azureum means "bright blue", a reference to its flower colour.

== Description ==
Muscari azureum is a small plant, around 4–15 cm (1.6–5.9 in) high with two to three grey-green leaves per bulb. Up to 60 flowers are borne in Spring (March or April in the Northern Hemisphere) in a dense "spike" (raceme). Each flower is 4–5 mm (0.16–0.20 in) long and bright blue in colour with a darker stripe along each of the lobes. A feature which distinguishes species placed in subgenus Pseudomuscari, like M. azureum, from other groups of Muscari is that the mouth of the flower is not narrowed but forms an open bell-shape. It grows in alpine meadows in north and east Turkey.

== Cultivation ==
M. azureum may be found in horticultural sources under the illegitimate name Hyacinthus azureus. The species is popular as a spring-flowering bulb; The botanist Brian Mathew describes it as "a delightful plant" for use in rock gardens or underneath shrubs. It is frost-hardy but should be grown in full sun. It has gained the Royal Horticultural Society's Award of Garden Merit. There is a white cultivar, 'Album'.
