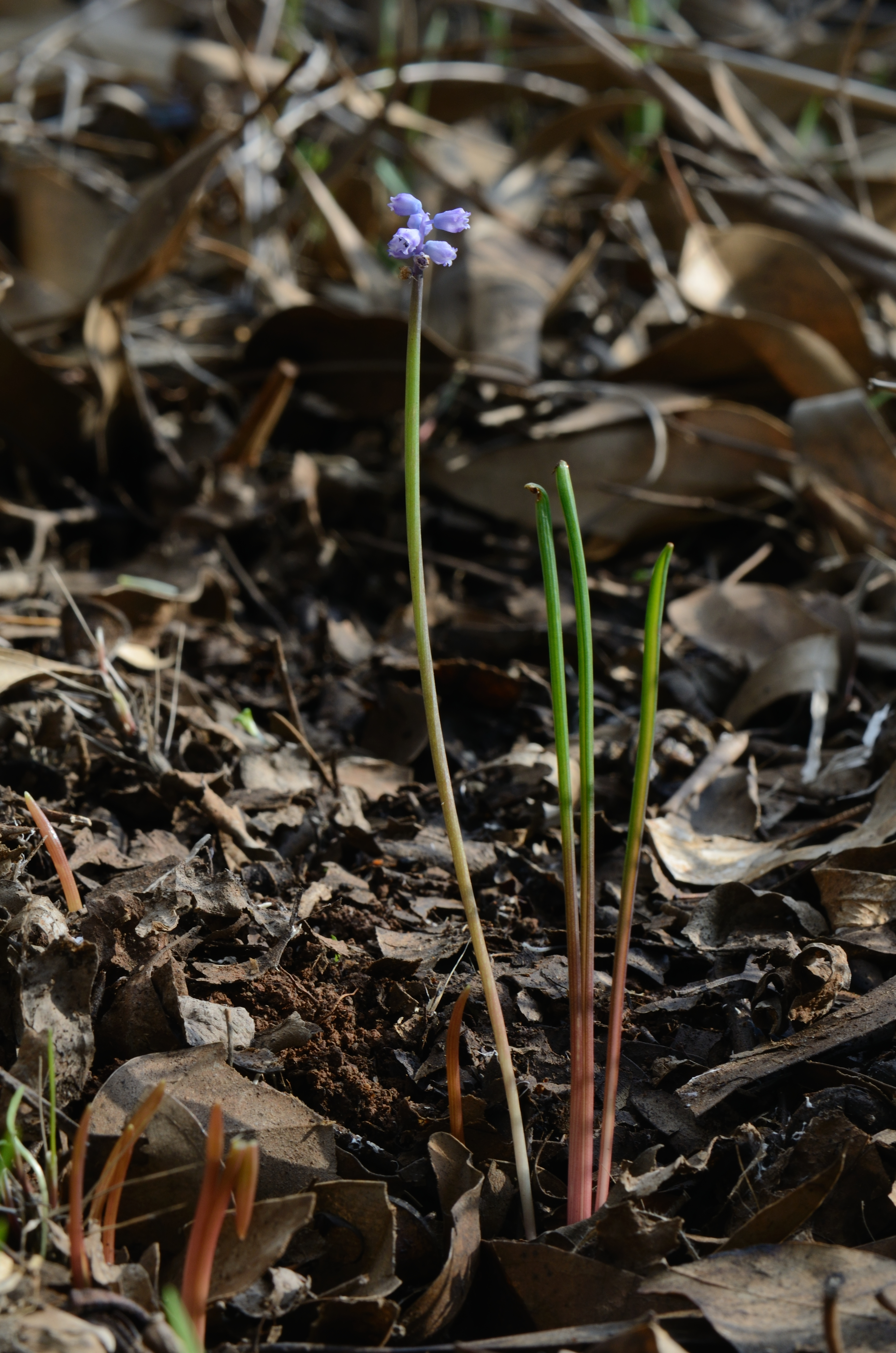

Scientific classification
- Kingdom: Plantae
- Clade: Tracheophytes
- Clade: Angiosperms
- Clade: Monocots
- Order: Asparagales
- Family: Asparagaceae
- Subfamily: Scilloideae
- Genus: Muscari
- Subgenus: Muscari subg. Pseudomuscari
- Species: M. parviflorum

Binomial name
- Muscari parviflorum Desf.

= Muscari parviflorum =

Species of plant

Muscari parviflorum is a species of plants in the family Asparagaceae.

== Sources ==
This article incorporates text from a free content work. Licensed under CC0 (license statement/permission). Text taken from Muscari parviflorum. Encyclopedia of Life.
