= Roncogno =

Austro-Hungarian artillery battery overlooking Trento, Trentino, Italy

Coordinates: 46°04′15″N 11°11′07″E

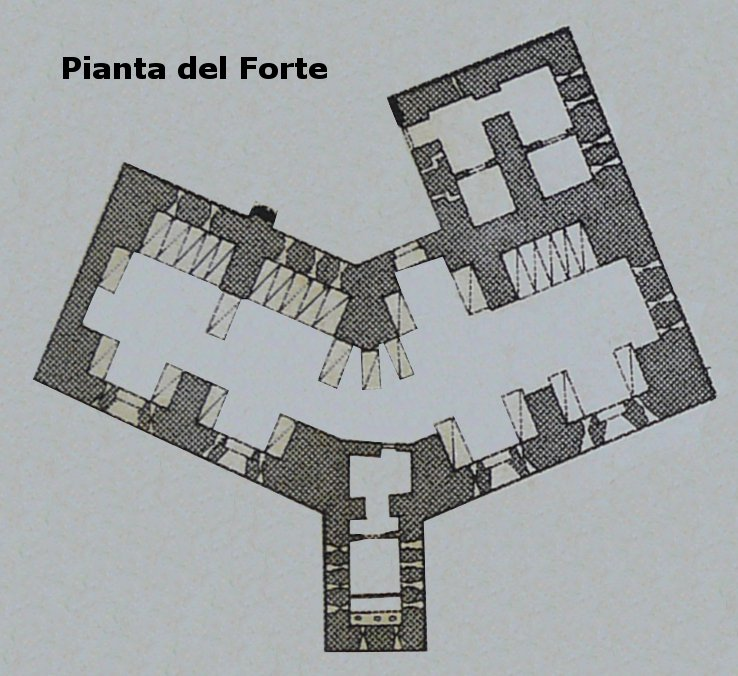
A floor plan of Roncogno

The Roncogno Battery was built in 1879-81 to bar the way to Trento from Valsugana. The battery was connected by trenches to the Cimirlo battery, which was a little higher up Monte Celva. The battery was constructed of limestone and has a horseshoe shape. The battery had an internal cistern in addition to the food-supply rooms. The battery was armed with three 9 cm M75 F.K. and four 12 cm M61 fortress guns in casemates.

== World War I ==
Like most fortifications around Trento, the battery was obsolete, so the decision was made to move the artillery from the fort to a special cave on the northern side of Monte Celva. The battery is the start of the famous "Path of 100 Steps".

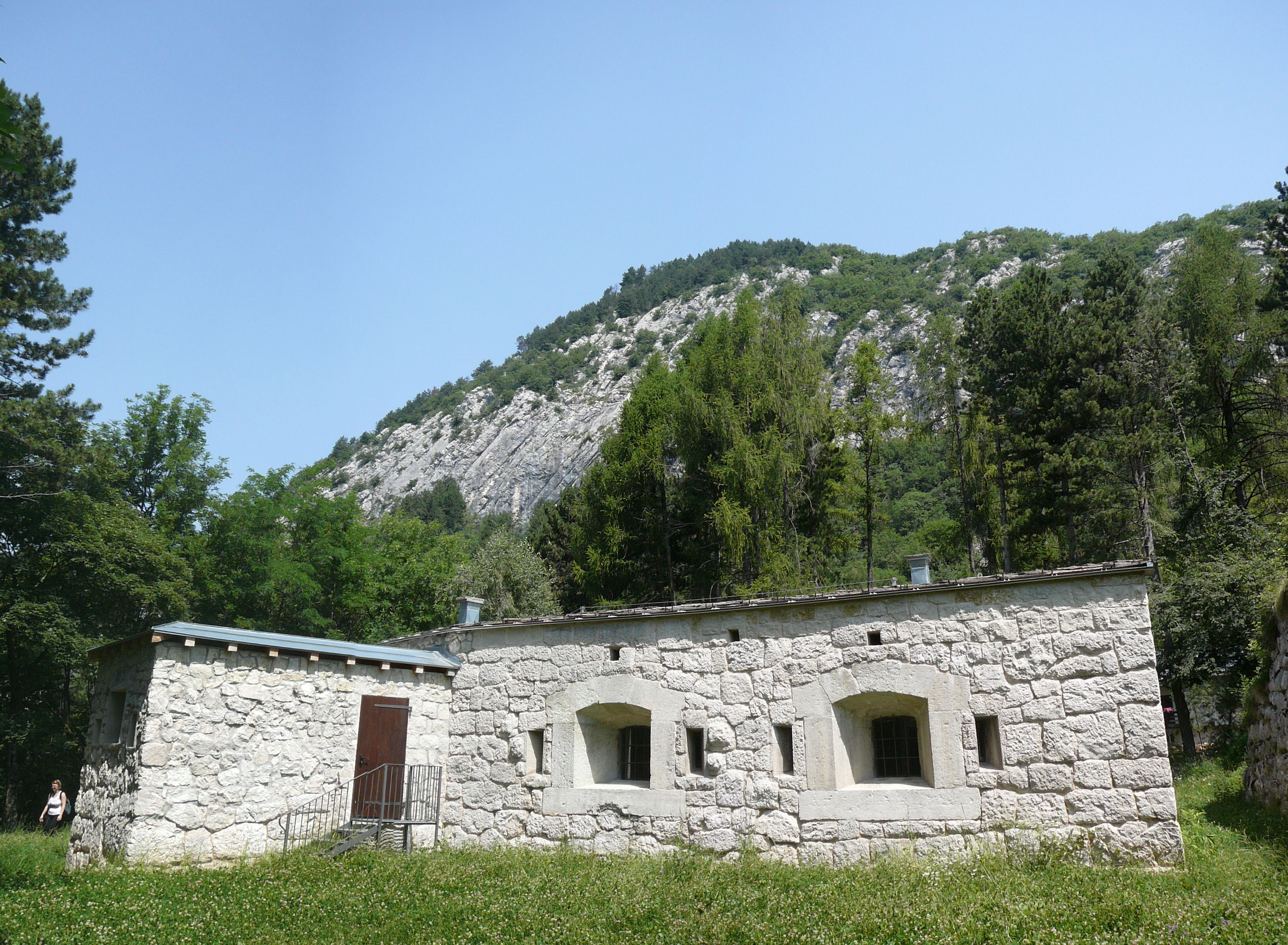
The left side of the battery, with Monte Celva as the backdrop

== Post-war ==
Roncogno was discharged from the military on December 8, 1927. The fort was sold, and in 1949 the property came under the ownership of the municipality of Trento. In 1989, the municipality started renovating the battery, trying to get it back to its original condition. In 2008, another renovation project was started.

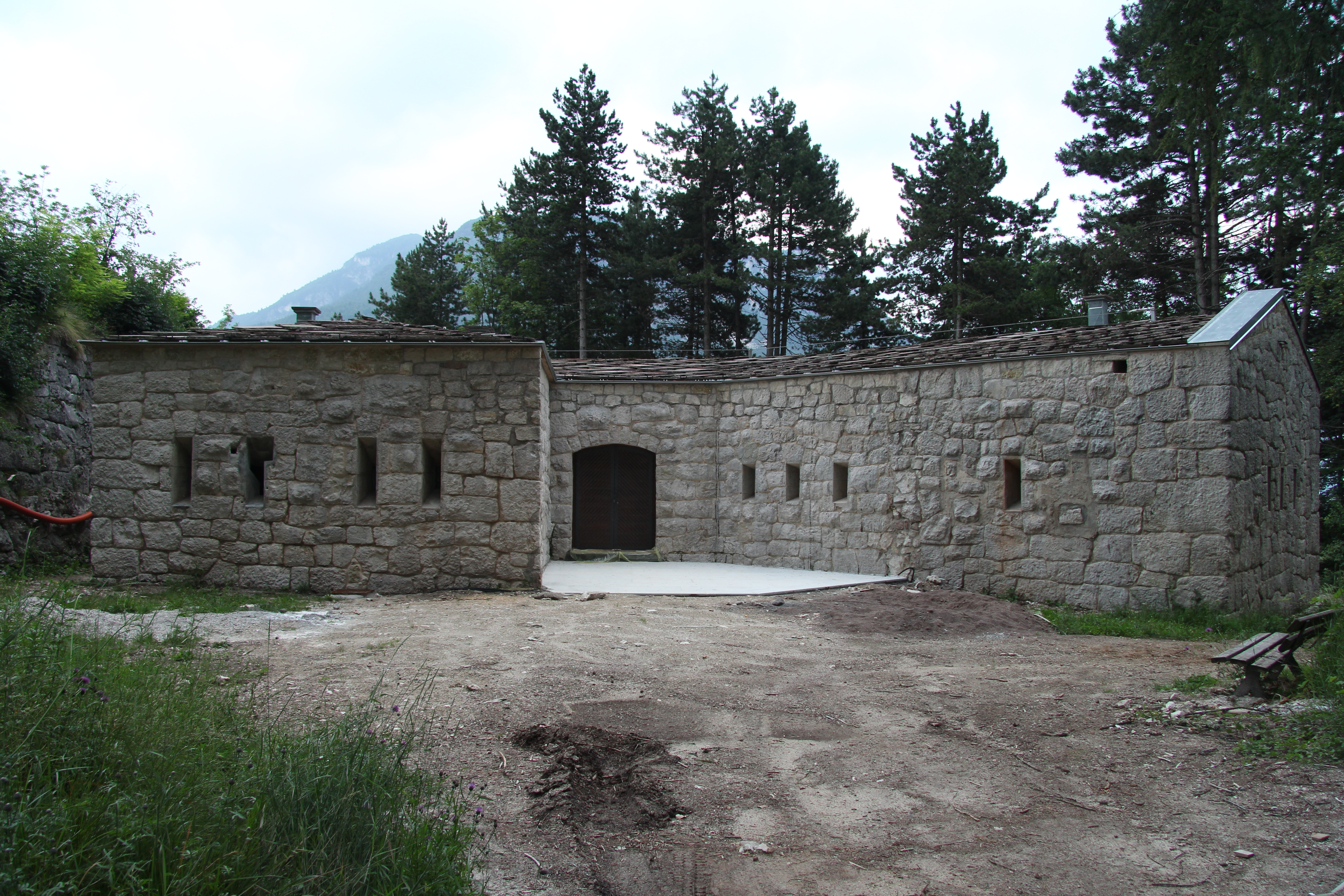
The rear side of Roncogno, with rifle slits to cover the entrance
