= Fabio Garbari =

Italian botanist

- Born: 1937-09-01; Pergine Valsugana
- Citizenship: Italy
- Education: University of Pisa
- Scientific career
- Fields: botany
- Workplaces: University of Pisa
- Author abbrev. (botany): Garbari

Fabio Garbari (born 1937) is an Italian botanist who has a degree in Biological Science from the University of Pisa awarded in 1958. From 1963 to 2007 he was a faculty member in the Department of Botanical Science (Dipartimento di Scienze Botaniche) of the University of Pisa. In 2019 he was awarded the Veitch Memorial Medal by the Royal Horticultural Society. The International Plant Names Index lists 37 taxa named by Garbari.

== Publications ==
- Garbari, Fabio; Tomasi, Lucia Tongiorgi & Tosi, Alessandro (1991), Giardino dei semplici : l'Orto botanico di Pisa dal XVI al XX secolo (in Italian), Ospedaletto: Pacini, ISBN 978-88-7781-058-8
- Garbari, Fabio & Tomasi, Lucia Tongiorgi (2007), Flora : the Erbario miniato and other drawings, Paper museum of Cassiano dal Pozzo, Series B, Natural history, part 6, London: Royal Collection, ISBN 978-1-905375-20-2
