= Valsugana =

Valleys in the autonomous province of Trentino in Northern Italy

Coordinates: 46°03′N 11°27′E

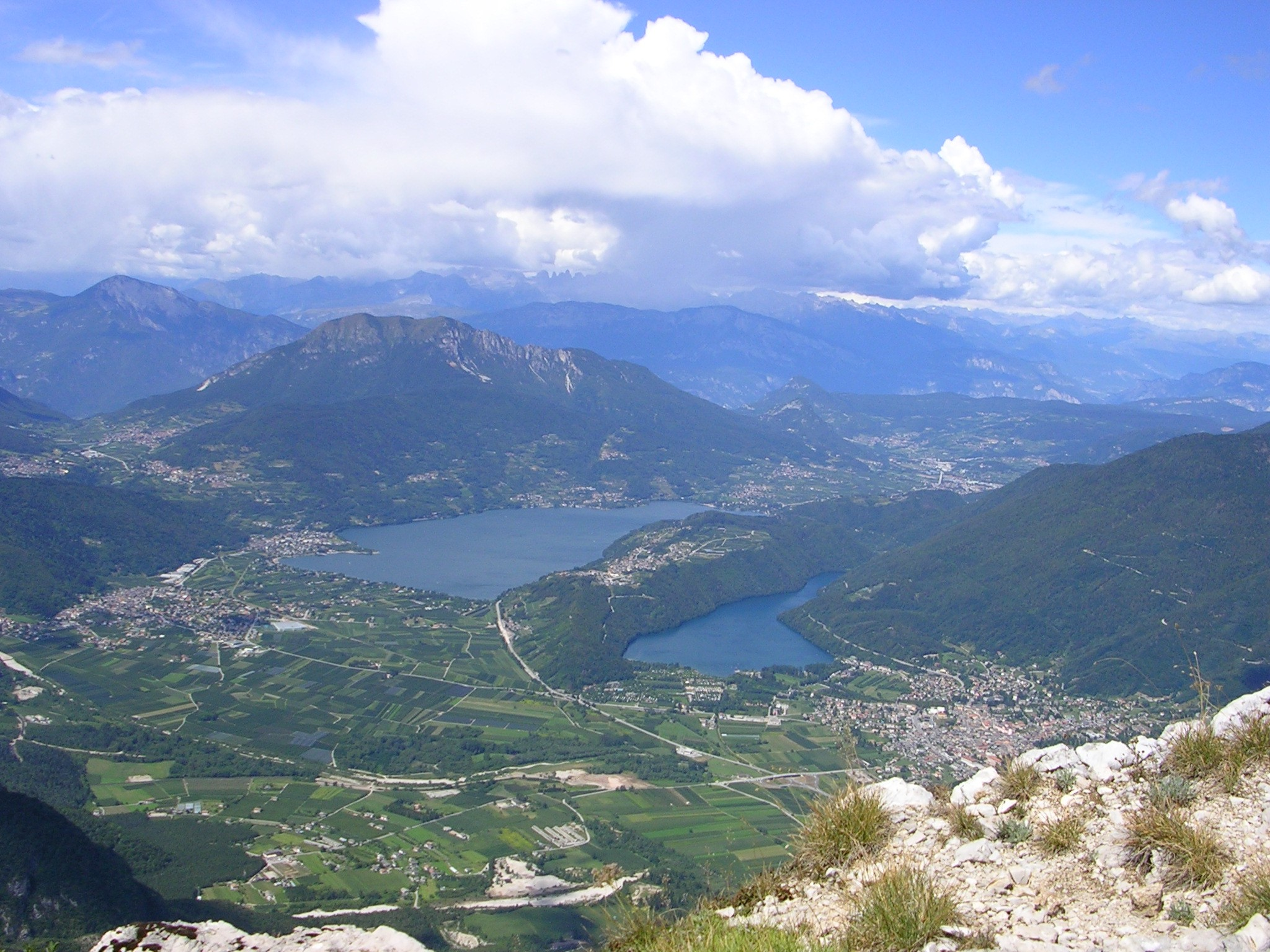
View of Caldonazzo and Levico lakes from Cima Vezzena

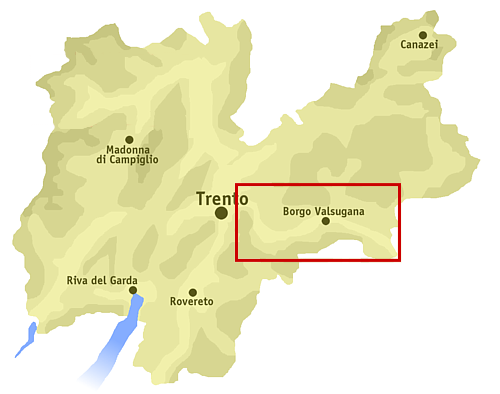
Map of Trentino with Sugana valley (Valsugana) marked in red.

The Valsugana (Italian: Valsugana, German: Suganertal) or Sugana Valley is one of the most important valleys in the autonomous province of Trentino in Northern Italy. Leading into the Alps' foothills, an important main north-south Roman road, the Via Claudia Augusta, one of Europe's main roads since its construction in Antiquity, winds along the valley and connects the Adriatic with the historic Holy Roman Empire and Frankish kingdom's centre of Augsburg.

The sturdy construction of this long-distance road running through the valley has made it historically one of the most important north-south European transit lanes because the route from the Veneto region to points near and beyond the famed Brenner Pass is significantly shorter than proceeding Venice to Verona to Brenner. Henry II used the road to bypass a position blocked by a rival allowing him to gain the throne of the Holy Roman Empire.

The Valle dei Mocheni is also of historic interest as it has remained a German-speaking enclave in modern Italy to this day. This came about as during the High Middle Ages while the region was ruled by the Holy Roman Empire (many Emperors were also Kings of Italy) many German-speaking farmers and miners settled into the region.

The western part of the valley nearest Trento is an extensive tourist area which began as a health spa during the late 19th century when the Levico Terme baths were established and became popular with the upper classes. This parallels the history of what became modern vacations and resort towns in much of the world (compare St Moritz, Mineral Wells, and Steamboat Springs), the situation in the valley being enhanced perhaps by the easy access both north and south given it by the sturdy Roman road, when roads were usually just dirt tracks with deep ruts and large puddles. Otherwise the scenery is marked by vineyards and orchards and groves of edible horse-chestnuts.

The Brenta River has its source at Lake Caldonazzo on the western extremity of the valley and flows down the valley until reaching the opposite end of the valley at Bassano del Grappa, on its way to the Adriatic Sea.

Lake Caldonazzo, and the village of Caldonazzo, is a further international tourist center located just south of the Dolomite Mountains, a southern foothill range of the higher Alps just to the North.

Together, Caldonazzo Lake and the Dolomites create one of the most beautiful regions of northern Italy and harbor a host of outdoor sporting activities, such as climbing, hiking, mountain biking, power boating, sailing, and windsurfing to name just a few.

== See also ==
- Mount Lefre
