= Caldonazzo =

- Comune
- Comune di Caldonazzo
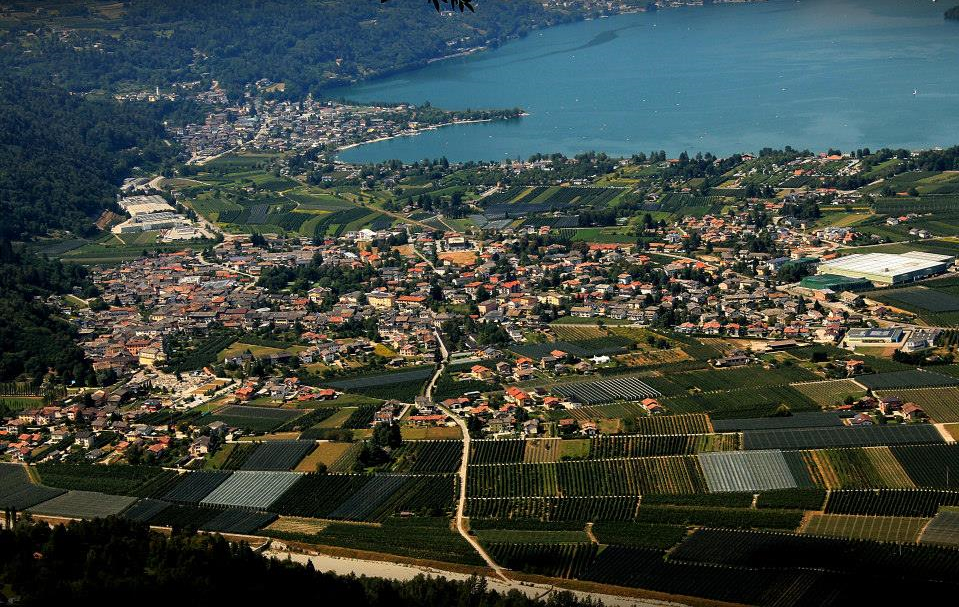
- View of Caldonazzo

- Location within Italy Location within Trentino-Alto Adige/Südtirol
- Coordinates: 46°0′N 11°16′E
- Country: Italy
- Region: Trentino-Alto Adige/Südtirol
- Province: Trentino (TN)
- Frazioni: Brenta, Lochere, Monterovere, Piatéle, Giàmai, Dossi, Bagiàni, Maso Stanchi, Maso Bernabè, Maso Gasperi, Maso alla Costa

Government
  - Mayor: Stefano Riccamboni

Area
  - Total: 21 km^{2} (8.1 sq mi)
- Elevation: 530 m (1,740 ft)

Population (2026)
  - Total: 4,010
  - Density: 190/km^{2} (490/sq mi)
- Demonym: Caldonazzesi o Panizzari (in local dialect)
- Time zone: UTC+1 (CET)
  - Summer (DST): UTC+2 (CEST)
- Postal code: 38052
- Dialing code: 0461
- Patron saint: Saint Sixtus II
- Saint day: 6 August
- Website: Official website

Caldonazzo (German: Gallnötsch, Cimbrian: Kalnètsch) is a commune in Valsugana, in Trentino, northern Italy.

The nearby Lake of Caldonazzo is the source of the Brenta River.

== History ==
Caldonazzo was first mentioned in historical records in the year 1116. It is located two kilometers from the lake of the same name, Caldonazzo Lake, picturesquely nestled at the foot of steep mountain forests, where the steep Centa Valley opens into the broader landscape (450 m s.l.m.).

The town has a turbulent history, with evidence of Roman settlements. For example, on the "Colle di Tenna," where Roman mule tracks lead to an old "Statio Militaris." Today, a chapel from the 12th century stands at this site. Traces from the time of the Migration Period indicate that the town played a significant role in history on multiple occasions.

For a long time, the town belonged to the Danube Monarchy (see Lordship of Caldonatz). The border with the Kingdom of Italy was only a few kilometers away on the Folgaria plateau, where numerous bunkers and structures from that era can still be seen today. The best-preserved one is Werk Gschwent, which now houses a museum. The entire Valsugana region offers many historically significant sites for those interested in history.

== Trapp, an Austrian Noble Family ==
Between the church and the cemetery stands the old, stately Castel Trapp. Although weathered, the old masonry still clearly displays a fresco of a coat of arms that Austrians will find familiar, as it features the well-known red-white-red shield.

The Trapp family, belonging to an old Austrian noble lineage, resided in this castle. In 1461, they left their homeland and their ancestral castle, Schloss Trautenburg, near Leutschach in Styria (which still exists today). For over 300 years, until 1794, when the last descendant of the Counts of Trapp died, Caldonazzo was closely associated with this name. Historical accounts describe them as just, benevolent, and capable. The memory of their charitable deeds lived on among the population for a long time.

== Parish Church of St. Sixtus ==
Apart from the old townscape with its picturesque houses away from the center, the church dedicated to Saint Barbara is also noteworthy. Its older section bears the name of Pope Sixtus. Built in the 13th century, it was renovated and remodeled over the years. Its current appearance dates back to 1836, and its style contrasts significantly with the Romanesque church tower. Inside, an old painting depicting Pope Sixtus surrounded by Saints Borromeo, Francis, and Sebastian serves as a reminder of the plague that ravaged Caldonazzo in 1630. The painting dates back to 1632.

== Infrastructure ==
Caldonazzo is located along the Trento–Venice railway line. The town is also accessible via the provincial roads (Strada Provinciale) SP1 and SP113 and is connected to the highway network through the Strada Statale 47 della Valsugana SS47, the Strada Statale 349 di Val d’Assa e Pedemontana Costo, and the Autostrada A22.
