= Levico Terme =

- Comune
- Comune di Levico Terme
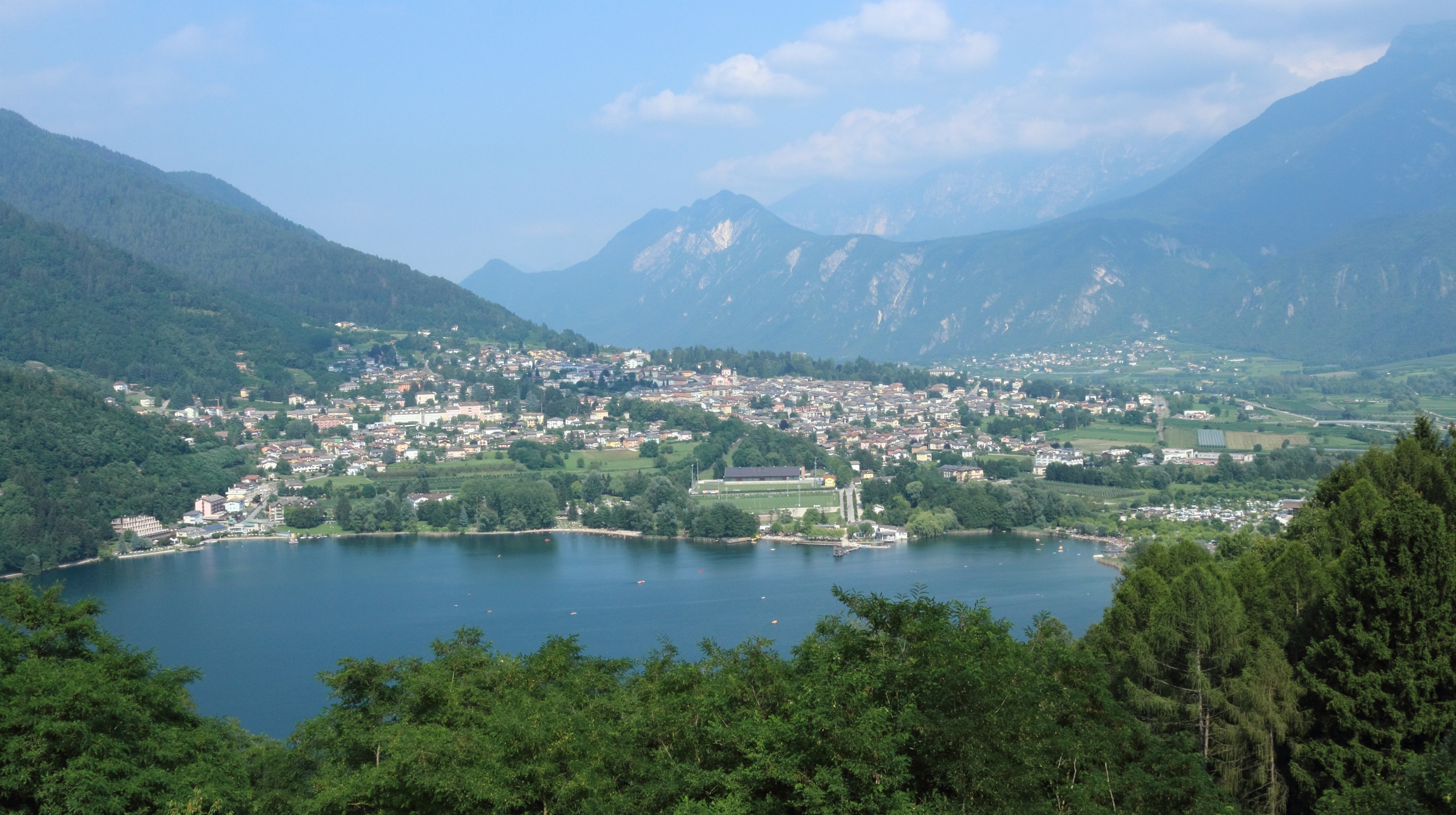
- Levico Terme seen from near the Tenna municipality with Lake Levico in the front.

- Coat of arms

- Location within Italy Location within Trentino-Alto Adige/Südtirol
- Coordinates: 46°1′N 11°18′E
- Country: Italy
- Region: Trentino-Alto Adige/Südtirol
- Province: Trentino (TN)
- Frazioni: Santa Giuliana, Barco, Campiello, Vetriolo Terme, Selva, Quaere

Government
  - Mayor: Gianni Beretta

Area
  - Total: 62.9 km^{2} (24.3 sq mi)
- Elevation: 520 m (1,710 ft)

Population (2026)
  - Total: 8,334
  - Density: 132/km^{2} (343/sq mi)
- Demonym: Levicensi or levegani
- Time zone: UTC+1 (CET)
  - Summer (DST): UTC+2 (CEST)
- Postal code: 38056
- Dialing code: 0461
- Patron saint: Most Holy Redeemer (SS. Redentore)
- Saint day: 3rd Sunday of July
- Website: Official website

Levico Terme (Levego in local dialect; Löweneck in German; Cimbrian: Leve) is a comune (municipality) and a town in Trentino in the northern Italian region Trentino-Alto Adige/Südtirol. As of 30 June 2012, it had a population of 7,668 and an area of 62.9 square kilometres (24.3 mi^{2}).

== Geography ==
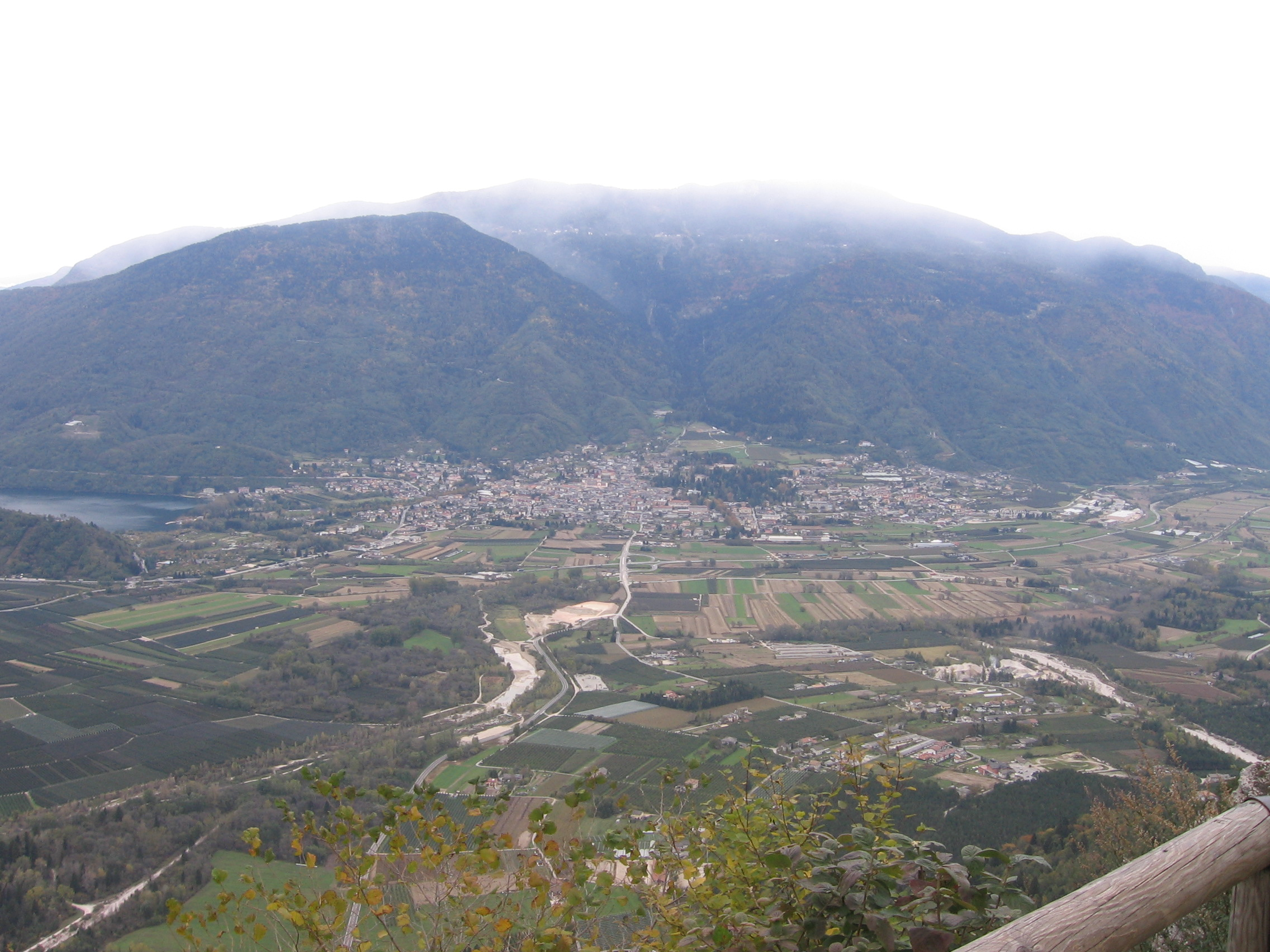
View of Levico Terme, with the lake on the left side

Levico Terme is located on the highest point of the Valsugana valley bottom, at 520 metres (1,710 ft) above sea level, 22 kilometres (14 mi) from Trento and about 110 kilometres (68 mi) from Padua, on the banks of the Rio Maggiore brook, which is a tributary of Lake Levico, from which originates the Brenta River.

The town is dominated by the mountains of the Lagorai range on the north, with Monte Fronte, elevation 1,582 metres (5,190 ft), and Monte Panarotta (2,002 metres (6,568 ft)), and the zone of the Plateaus (Vezzena, Lavarone, Luserna, Folgaria) on the south, where Cima Vezzena, also locally called Pizzo di Levico 1,908 metres (6,260 ft), with its distinctive Austro-Hungarian fort on its top, and Cima Pegolara are located. To the west the Vigolana range can be seen past the lakes of Levico and Caldonazzo, and on the east the valley opens considerably, and the view extends beyond Borgo Valsugana.

The urbanised area is predominantly on the valley floor, with the main urban centre lying on the left side of the river Brenta along with the frazioni of Selva and Campiello, while on the right of the river lie the 'frazioni' of Barco, Santa Giuliana and Quaere. Other hamlets do not lie on the valley floor, though their population is low and often tied to seasonal activities such as tourism (Vetriolo Terme, 1,500 metres (4,900 ft)) or mountain activities such as logging, grazing and recreation (Passo Vezzena, 1,402 metres (4,600 ft)).

The municipality is traditionally divided into six rioni (quarters): Chiesa (north-west), Furo (north-east), Grande (south-west) and Cortina (southeast) in the main urban centre, Oltrebrenta comprising all the frazioni on the right bank of the Brenta (Barco, Santa Giuliana, Quaere), and Selva comprising the village of the same name and Campiello.

West of the city, above Lake Levico, lies Forte Col De Le Bene, an Austro-Hungarian fort, also known as Forte San Biagio, from the name of the hill it is built on.

== History ==
=== Ancient history ===
Traces of the first inhabitants in the area can be dated back to the Iron Age, though the first organised settlement springs up during the Roman era. The etymology of the name "Levico" is debated. The major theories make Levico derive from Celtic terms such as leoug, leak or lewa, signifying "border post/boundary marker", or from the barbaric gentilic Letta, from which came Levi vicus then contracted into Levicus, or from the Latin (praedium) Livicune ("Livius' farm", then vulgarised into Lievigo and Levigo) or Laevus vicus, "village left [of the river]". The Latin interpretations are the ones most agreed with, given the abundance of Latin terms in the topography of the municipality (such as Furo, from forum). Successive Lombard presence is also cited in various documents and found in some toponyms, such as Guizza (from wizza, communal grazeland).

=== Bishopric of Trent ===
In 1027, the territory of Levico passed under the Bishopric of Trent, established with Conrad II's donation to Bishop Ulrich II. However, Levico remained under the Diocese of Feltre regarding spiritual authority, and would remain that way until 1785. The name Levico (as Levigo) appears for the first time in a document dated 29 October 1184, in a papal bull in which Pope Lucius III reaffirms the rights of the Diocese of Feltre in Valsugana.

Levico followed the history of the Bishopric, and, as communitas Levigi, proclaimed its statute in 1431 and 1479. During the German Peasants' War, in August 1525, peasants from the Valsugana marched towards Trento against the then-Bishop's Captain; the rebellion, however, was rapidly crushed. In 1575 and 1636 Levico was ravaged by plague epidemics; the latter cut the population in half.

In the 18th century, scientific journals spread news about the health effects of the local waters, rich in arsenic and iron, which were mentioned in Michelangelo Mariani's History of the Council of Trent in 1673. The first spa building taking advantage of these springs was opened in 1860.

=== The Austrian period to the present day ===
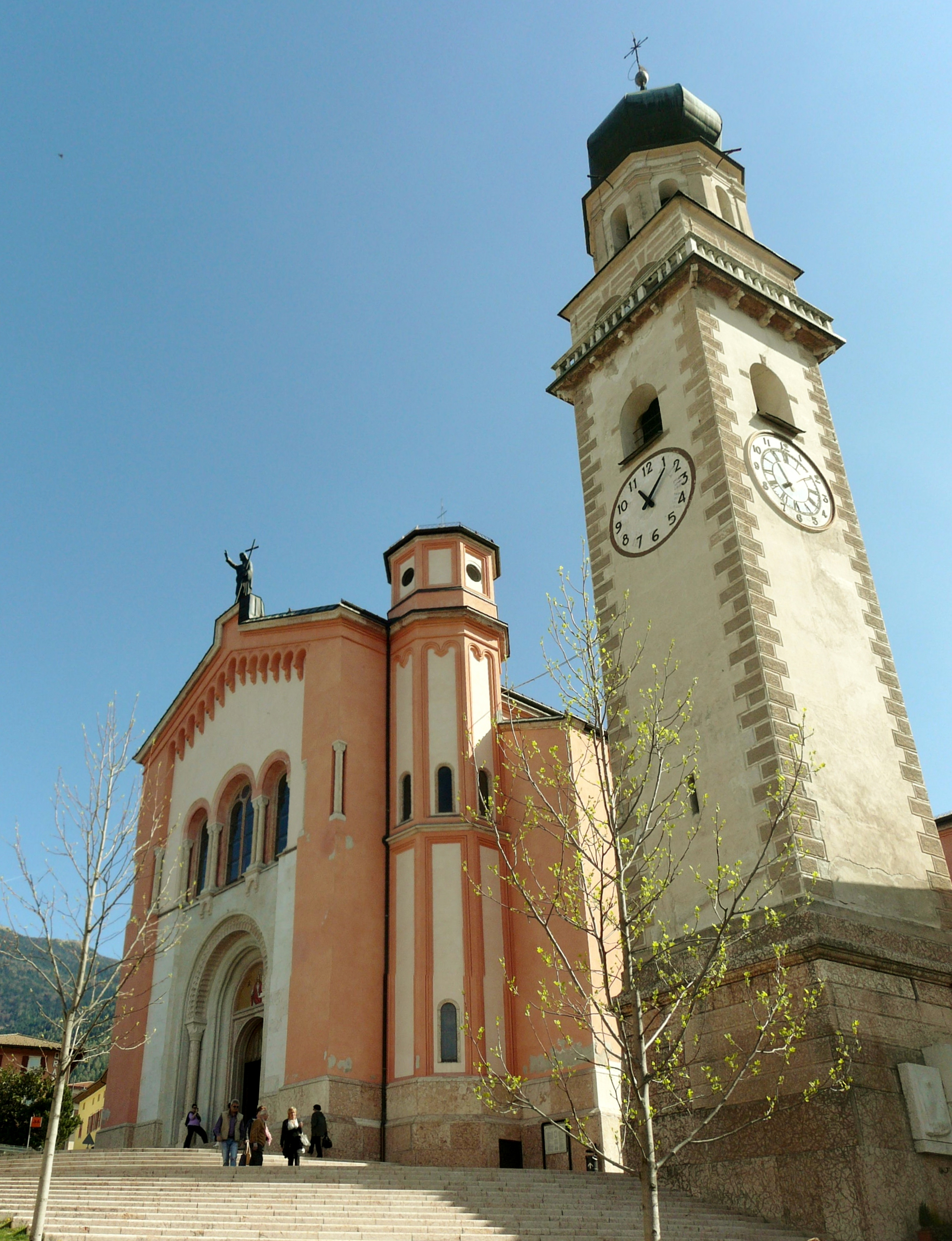
Parish church

In 1779, through a treaty between Austria and the Bishopric of Trent, the jurisdiction of Levico passed to the House of Habsburg.

Napoleon I, on his way to the battle of Bassano in September 1796, after reaching Trento passed through the Valsugana, encountering a light Austrian resistance in Levico, which was then defined by Napoleon loco ameno et hospitale (quaint and hospitable town). Afterwards, Levico would follow the rest of Trentino in its annexation to Austria, after the abolition of the Bishopric as a political entity in 1803. The Third Italian War of Independence saw a battle between Austrian and Italian troops, during the latter's advance towards Trento, fought in town through the night of 23-24 July 1866. In 1894 Levico was elevated to the rank of city (Stadtgemeinde), by Imperial-Royal Decree, under Franz Joseph I of Austria, and in 1896 it was reached by the Valsugana railway.

At the outbreak of World War I, Levico was still part of Austria-Hungary, and as such it supplied a contingent of soldiers (The 1st Kaiserjäger Regiment had a battalion stationed in the city). The civilian population, though, was mostly deported to internment camps (Internierungslager) in the heartland of the Empire when Italy joined the Entente on 24 May 1915. The city lay indeed right next to the frontline of the plateaus to the south, and most of the population ended up in camps in Moravia, in the so-called wooden cities. Those that, mostly for being suspected of holding pro-Italian positions, were deemed to pose a security risk were instead interned in Katzenau, in harsh conditions.

The peace treaty assigned Levico, along with the rest of Trentino and South Tyrol, to Italy. The city had been devastated by abandonment and the long absence of workers, and reconstruction was slow. In order to hasten the rebuilding, the massive Austro-Hungarian forts that had been employed during the war were scavenged for scrap iron and building material, making most of these forts little more than ruins.

World War II touched Levico, along with the rest of the province, only to a limited extent until the Badoglio Proclamation on 8 September 1943, when it was invaded by the Wehrmacht and incorporated to the Alpenvorland under direct German administration. The city was chosen as the site of the Deutsches Marinekommando Italien from October/November 1943 to February 1944, and from July 1944 to 27 April 1945 (as Marineoberkommando Süd), despite lying more than 100 kilometres (62 mi) inland from the Adriatic Sea. Levico was bombed many times throughout the second part of the war; the largest bombing, on 15 March 1945 destroyed the spa building and the Regina hotel, at the time one of the most luxurious hotels in the region.

After the war, Levico saw a large urbanistic expansion and the rebuilding of the spa complex (opened in 1965), developing the existing tourism-based economy even more. As tourist destination Levico Terme is mainly geared towards senior citizens and families with small children. Thermal treatments, biking and excursions in the area are possible. Around 50 restaurants and 30 accommodation facilities are available to guests.

== Demographic evolution ==
Historical population

Year	Pop.	±%
1861	?	—
1871	?	—
1881	?	—
1901	?	—
1911	?	—

Year	Pop.	±%
1921	7,044	—
1931	6,318	−10.3%
1936	5,431	−14.0%
1951	5,587	+2.9%
1961	5,684	+1.7%

Year	Pop.	±%
1971	5,527	−2.8%
1981	5,569	+0.8%
1991	5,683	+2.0%
2001	6,325	+11.3%
2011	7,515	+18.8%

Source: Data from ISTAT

== Twin towns ==
Levico Terme is twinned with:

- Hausham, Germany, since 1959
