= Lake Levico =

Lake in Trentino, Italy

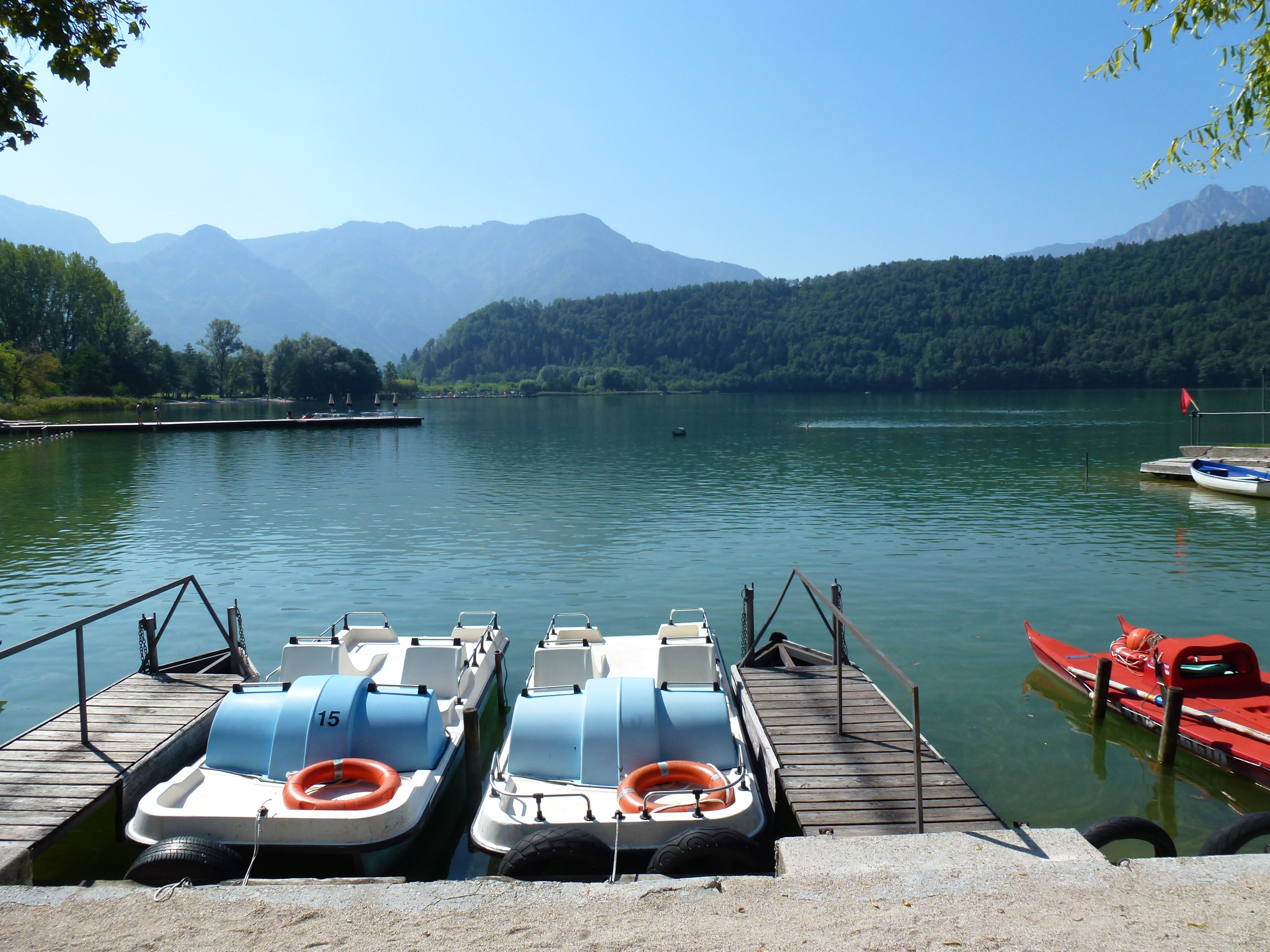
- Lake Levico

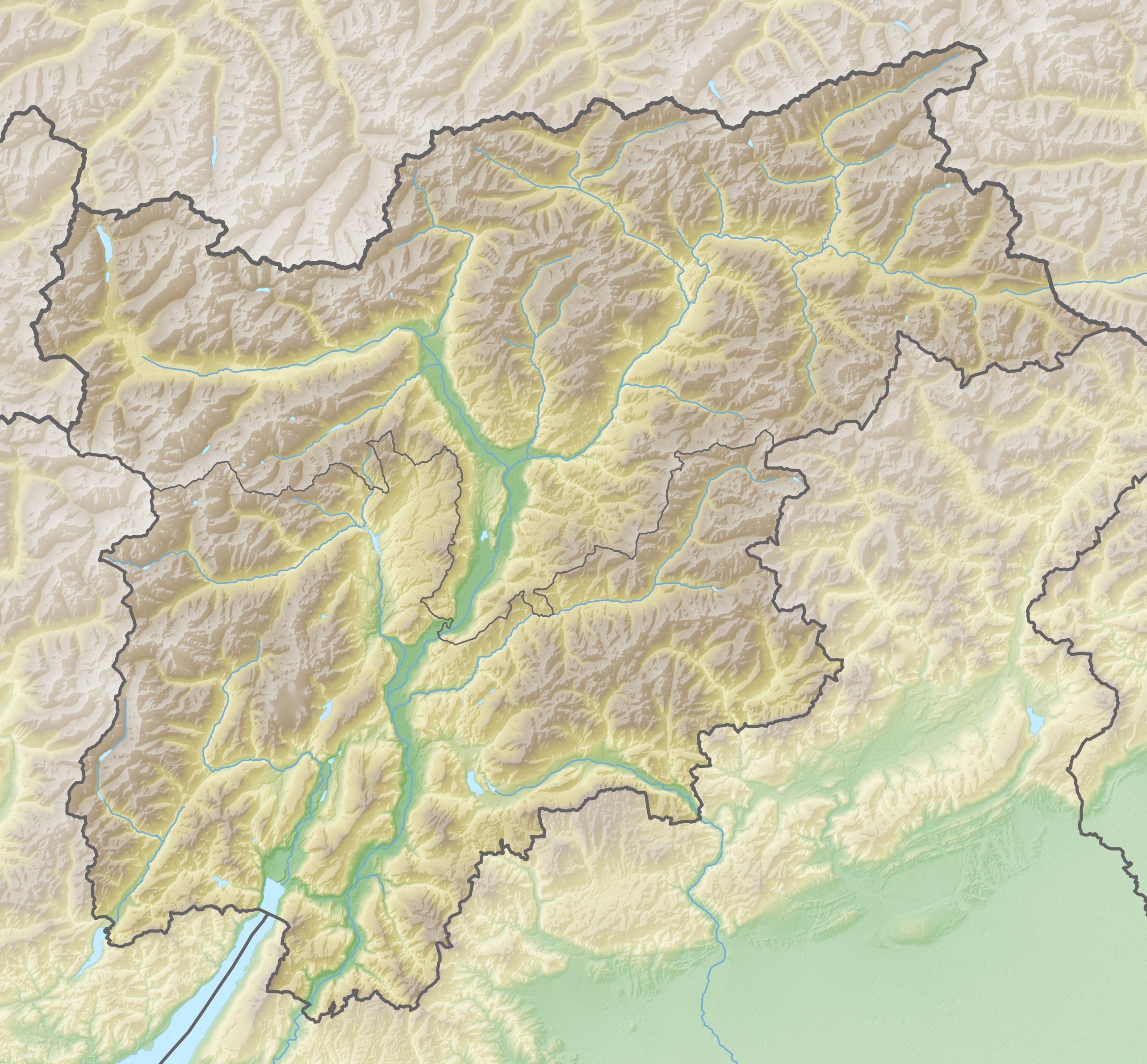
- Location within Trentino-Alto Adige/Südtirol
- Location: Trentino
- Coordinates: 46°0′49.24″N 11°16′41.55″E
- Primary inflows: Rio Vignola, Rio Maggiore
- Primary outflows: Brenta
- Basin countries: Italy
- Surface area: 1.164 km^{2} (0.449 sq mi)
- Max. depth: 38 m (124 ft)
- Surface elevation: 440 m (1,440 ft)

Lake Levico is a natural lake in Trentino, Italy. At an elevation of 440 m, its surface area is 1.164 km². It is known for its clean water. There is a spa offering mineral water.
