= Lake Caldonazzo =

Lake in Trentino, Italy

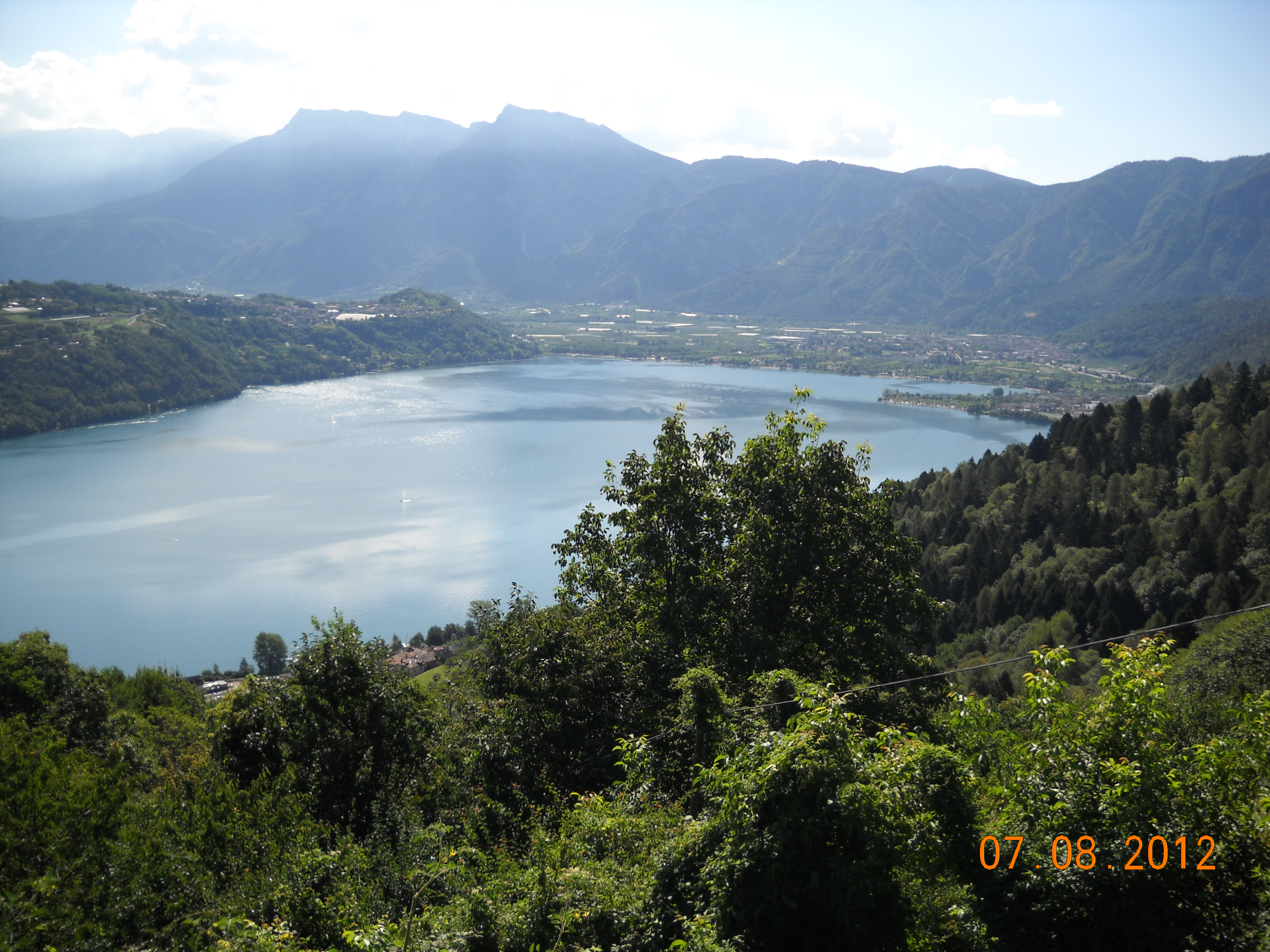

- Location within Italy Location within Alps
- Location: Trentino
- Coordinates: 46°01′08″N 11°14′32″E
- Primary inflows: Torrente Mandola
- Primary outflows: Brenta
- Basin countries: Italy
- Surface area: 5.38 km^{2} (2.08 sq mi)
- Average depth: 26.5 m (87 ft)
- Max. depth: 49 m (160 ft)
- Surface elevation: 449 m (1,473 ft)

Lake Caldonazzo (Italian: Lago di Caldonazzo) is a lake in Trentino, Italy. At an elevation of 449 m, its surface area is 5.38 km^{2}. It is located in the valley communities of Alta Valsugana e Bersntol. Lake Caldonazzo is the largest lake within the borders of Trentino and is the origin of the Brenta river.

The lake averages 26.5m in depth and is one of the warmest lakes in Europe, with temperatures reaching between 18 and 24 °C in the summer.

Caldonazzo is famous for water sports such as canoeing, sailing, wind surfing and water skiing. It is the only lake in Trentino where water skiing is permitted, and notably is the "training ground" for world champion skier Thomas Degasperi.

In 2024, Lake Caldonazzo received four blue flags its Lido, Tenna, San Cristoforo and Calceranica beaches for their exceptionally clean water.

== Events ==
Many events take place on the lake, especially during the summer.

- In August, the Palio dei Draghi or Dragon Boat race takes place between boats driven by many rowers.
- Every year on August 14, a fireworks display is organised to celebrate Ferragosto.
- The Finale Nazionale Canoagiovani, Italy's largest youth canoe, kayak and rowing event has been held on the lake for the last 16 years.
